= Colorado =

U.S. state

- State
- Flag Seal
- Nicknames: The Centennial State
- Motto(s): Nil sine numine (English: Nothing without providence)
- Anthem: Where the Columbines Grow and Rocky Mountain High
- Location of Colorado within the United States
- Coordinates: 39.0°N 105.5°W
- Country: United States
- Before statehood: Territory of Colorado
- Admitted to the Union: August 1, 1876; 150 years ago (38th)
- Capital (and largest city): Denver
- Largest county or equivalent: El Paso
- Largest metro and urban areas: Denver

Government
  - Governor: Jared Polis (D)
  - Lieutenant Governor: Dianne Primavera (D)
- Legislature: General Assembly
  - Upper house: Senate
  - Lower house: House of Representatives
- Judiciary: Supreme Court (list)
- U.S. senators: Michael Bennet (D); John Hickenlooper (D)
- U.S. House delegation: 4 Democrats; 4 Republicans (list)

Area
  - Total: 104,185 sq mi (269,837 km^{2})
  - Land: 103,813 sq mi (268,875 km^{2})
  - Water: 371 sq mi (962 km^{2}) 0.36%
  - Rank: 8th

Dimensions
  - Length: 280 mi (451 km)
  - Width: 380 mi (612 km)
- Elevation: 6,790 ft (2,070 m)
- Highest elevation (Mount Elbert (Note: Elevation adjusted to North American Vertical Datum of 1988)): 14,440 ft (4,401.2 m)
- Lowest elevation (Arikaree River at Kansas border): 3,317 ft (1,011 m)

Population (2025)
  - Total: ▲6,012,561
  - Rank: 20th
  - Density: 56.3/sq mi (21.72/km^{2})
  - Rank: 37th
  - Median household income: $92,900 (2023)
  - Income rank: 9th
- Demonym: Coloradan

Language
  - Official language: English
- Time zone: UTC−07:00 (MST)
  - Summer (DST): UTC−06:00 (MDT)
- USPS abbreviation: CO
- ISO 3166 code: US-CO
- Latitude: 37°N to 41°N
- Longitude: 102.0467°W to 109.0467°W
- Website: colorado.gov

Colorado (Note: /ˌkɒləˈrædoʊ, -ˈrɑːdoʊ/ KOL-ə-RAD-oh, -RAH-doh, other variants; Spanish: [koloˈɾaðo]) is a landlocked state in the Mountain West subregion of the Western United States. It is part of the Southwestern United States, sharing the Four Corners region with Arizona, New Mexico, and Utah. It is also bordered by Wyoming to the north, Nebraska to the northeast, Kansas to the east, and Oklahoma to the southeast. Colorado is noted for its landscape of mountains, forests, high plains, mesas, canyons, plateaus, rivers, and desert lands. It encompasses most of the Southern Rocky Mountains, as well as the northeastern portion of the Colorado Plateau and the western edge of the Great Plains. Colorado is the eighth-largest U.S. state by area and the 20th by population. The United States Census Bureau estimated the population of Colorado to be 5,957,493 as of July 1, 2024, a 3.2% increase from the 2020 United States census.

The region has been inhabited by Native Americans and their Paleo-Indian ancestors for at least 13,500 years and possibly much longer. The eastern edge of the Rocky Mountains was a major migration route for early peoples who spread throughout the Americas. In 1848, much of the Nuevo México region was annexed to the United States with the Treaty of Guadalupe Hidalgo. The Pike's Peak Gold Rush of 1858–1862 created an influx of settlers. On February 28, 1861, U.S. president James Buchanan signed an act creating the Territory of Colorado, and on August 1, 1876, president Ulysses S. Grant signed Proclamation 230, admitting Colorado to the Union as the 38th state.

Denver is the capital, the most populous city, and the center of the Front Range Urban Corridor. Colorado Springs is the second-most populous city of the state. Residents of the state are known as Coloradans, although the antiquated "Coloradoan" is occasionally used. Colorado generally ranks as one of the top U.S. states for education attainment, employment, and healthcare quality. Major parts of its economy include government and defense, mining, agriculture, tourism, and manufacturing. With increasing temperatures and decreasing water availability, Colorado's agriculture, forestry, and tourism economies are expected to be heavily affected by climate change.

== History ==
The region that is today the State of Colorado has been inhabited by Native Americans and their Paleo-Indian ancestors for at least 13,500 years and possibly more than 37,000 years. The Lindenmeier site contains artifacts dating from approximately 8720 BCE. The Ancient Pueblo peoples lived in the valleys and mesas of the Colorado Plateau in far southwestern Colorado. The Ute Nation inhabited the mountain valleys of the Southern Rocky Mountains and the Western Rocky Mountains, even as far east as the Front Range of the present day. The Apache and the Comanche also inhabited the Eastern and Southeastern parts of the state. In the 17th century, the Arapaho and Cheyenne moved west from the Great Lakes region to hunt across the High Plains of Colorado and Wyoming.

The U.S. acquired the territorial claim to the eastern Rocky Mountains with the Louisiana Purchase from France in 1803. In 1806, Zebulon Pike led a U.S. Army reconnaissance expedition into the disputed region. Colonel Pike and his troops were arrested by Spanish cavalrymen in the San Luis Valley the following February, taken to Chihuahua, and expelled from Mexico the following July.

Under the 1819 Adams-Onís Treaty, the U.S. acquired Florida from Spain while relinquishing claims to lands west of the 100th meridian and south of both the Arkansas River and the 42nd parallel. The treaty took effect on February 22, 1821. Having settled its border with Spain, the U.S. admitted the southeastern portion of the Territory of Missouri to the Union as the state of Missouri on August 10, 1821. The remainder of Missouri Territory, including what would become northeastern Colorado, became an unorganized territory and remained so for 33 years over the question of slavery. After 11 years of war, Spain finally recognized the independence of Mexico with the Treaty of Córdoba signed on August 24, 1821. Mexico eventually ratified the Adams–Onís Treaty in 1831. The Texian Revolt of 1835–36 fomented a dispute between the U.S. and Mexico which eventually erupted into the Mexican–American War in 1846. Mexico surrendered its northern territory to the U.S. with the Treaty of Guadalupe Hidalgo after the war in 1848; this included much of the western and southern areas of Colorado.

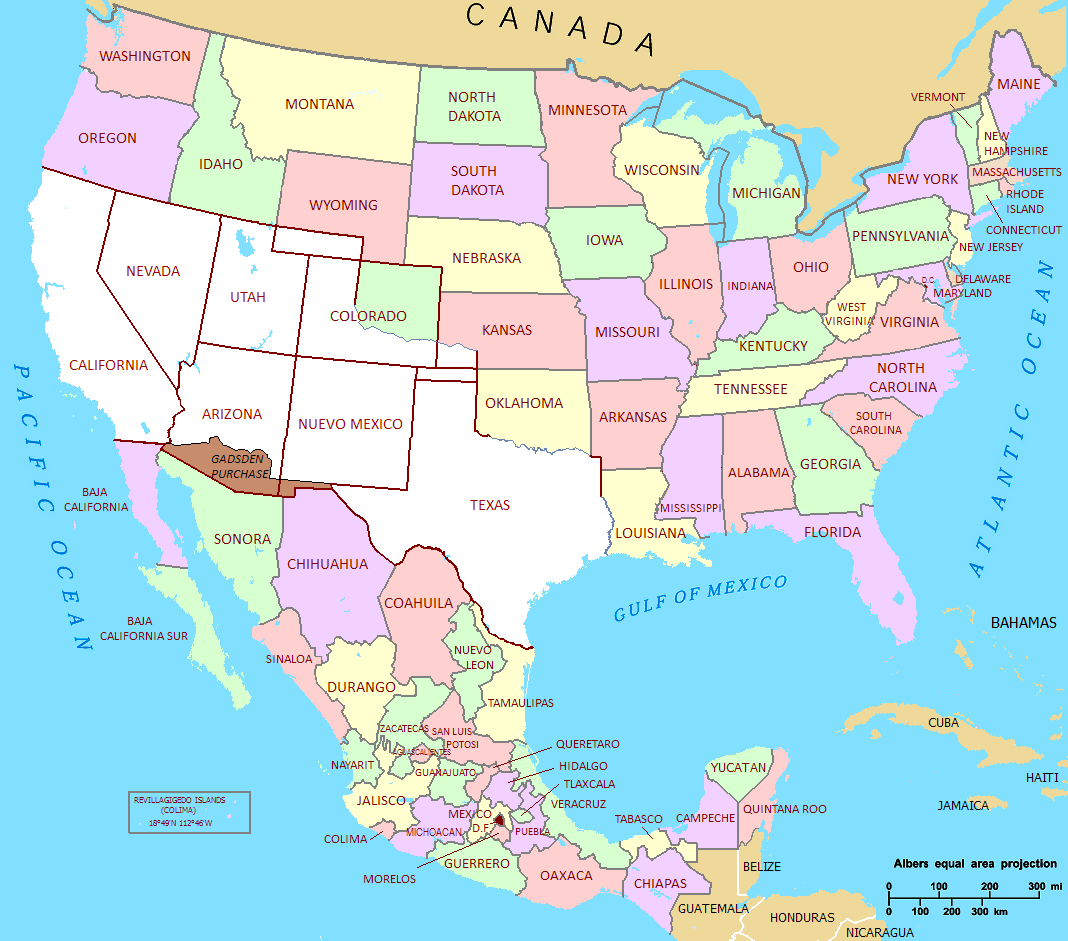
Map of the Mexican Cession, with the white representing the territory the United States received from Mexico (plus land ceded to the Republic of Texas) after the Mexican–American War. Well over half of Colorado was received from this treaty.

The Santa Fe Trail connected the Missouri River to Santa Fe, New Mexico, where it linked with the Camino Real de Tierra Adentro extending southward into Mexico. Others traveling overland avoided the rugged Southern Rocky Mountains, and instead followed the North Platte River and Sweetwater River to South Pass (Wyoming), the lowest crossing of the Continental Divide between the Southern Rocky Mountains and the Central Rocky Mountains. In 1849, the Mormons of the Salt Lake Valley organized the extralegal State of Deseret, claiming the entire Great Basin and all lands drained by the rivers Green, Grand, and Colorado. The federal government of the U.S. flatly refused to recognize the new Mormon government because it was theocratic and sanctioned plural marriage. Instead, the Compromise of 1850 divided the Mexican Cession and the northwestern claims of Texas into a new state and two new territories, the state of California, the Territory of New Mexico, and the Territory of Utah. On April 9, 1851, Hispano settlers from the area of Taos settled the village of San Luis, then in the New Mexico Territory, as Colorado's first permanent Euro-American settlement, further cementing the traditions of New Mexican cuisine and New Mexico music in the developing Southern Rocky Mountain Front.

The Provisional Government of the Territory of Jefferson was an extralegal and unrecognized United States territory that existed in the Pike's Peak mining region from October 24, 1859, until it yielded to the new Territory of Colorado on June 6, 1861. The Jefferson Territory included all of the present State of Colorado and portions of the present states of Kansas, Nebraska, Utah, and Wyoming. The people were desirous of a closer government than those five territories provided.

The government of the Jefferson Territory, while democratically elected, was never legally recognized by the United States government, although it managed the territory with relatively free rein for 19 months. Many of the laws enacted by the General Assembly of the Territory of Jefferson were reenacted and given official sanction by the new Colorado General Assembly in 1861.

=== Colorado Territory ===
The Territory of Colorado was an organized incorporated territory of the United States that existed from February 28, 1861, until August 1, 1876, when it was admitted to the Union as the 38th State of Colorado. The territory was created during the onset of the American Civil War in the wake of the Pike's Peak Gold Rush, which brought the first large concentration of settlers from the east to the region. The war stifled growth, but following the war mining grew more industrialized and fueled the economy. The construction of railroads further improved the economy. The boundaries of the newly designated Colorado Territory were very similar to those of the modern State of Colorado.

The territories of New Mexico, Utah, Kansas, and Nebraska before the creation of the Territory of Colorado

==== Civil war ====
In 1861 following the beginning of the American Civil War, there were several small disputes and skirmishes between confederate supporters and union supporters. In August, Governor Gilpin organized the 1st Colorado Infantry. John P. Slough led the group to New Mexico Territory in February–March 1862. There they fought in the battles of Apache Canyon, Glorieta Pass and Peralta. Slough resigned in April 1862 and was replaced by Major John M. Chivington.

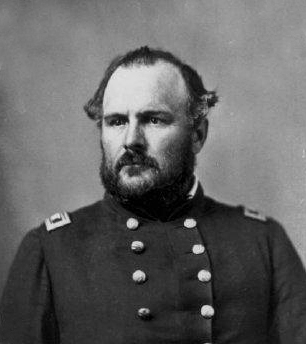
John Chivington, commander of the 3rd Colorado Cavalry at the Sand Creek Massacre.

With resources tied up in the war there was little left over for mines, farms, and infrastructure, and Denver stagnated.

On March 26, 1862 John Evans was appointed by Abraham Lincoln as the second governor of the territory. He prompted investment in Denver rail projects, and founded the University of Denver in 1864.

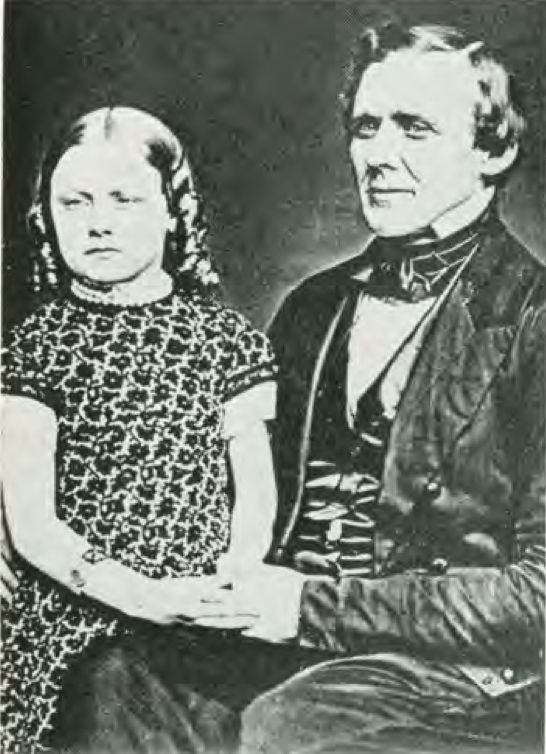
John Evans with daughter Josephine, c. 1859

Anti-native sentiment grew during the Civil War years. Exterminationist ideology, led in Colorado by Evans and Chivington, advocated for the total eradication of all native people in the territory. The Colorado War worsened relations with natives until 1864 when Chivington ordered the Sand Creek Massacre and Evans was forced to resign the following spring.

In 1867, the Union Pacific Railroad laid its tracks west to Weir, now Julesburg, in the northeast corner of the Territory. The Union Pacific linked up with the Central Pacific Railroad at Promontory Summit, Utah, on May 10, 1869, to form the First transcontinental railroad. The Denver Pacific Railway reached Denver in June of the following year, and the Kansas Pacific arrived two months later to forge the second line across the continent.

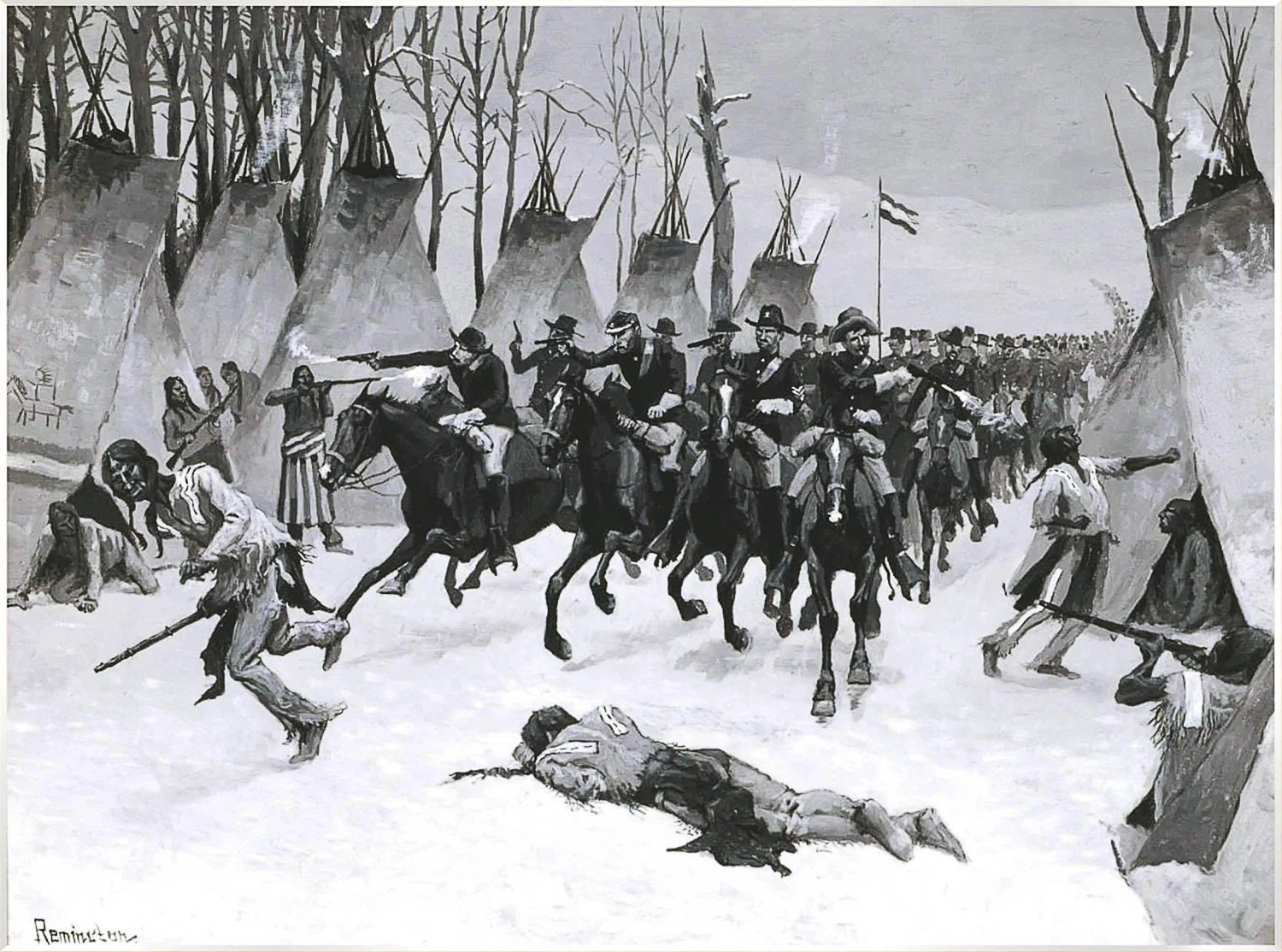
The Sand Creek Massacre occurred in 1864 during the American Indian Wars when the U.S. Army fought Native Americans.

=== Statehood ===
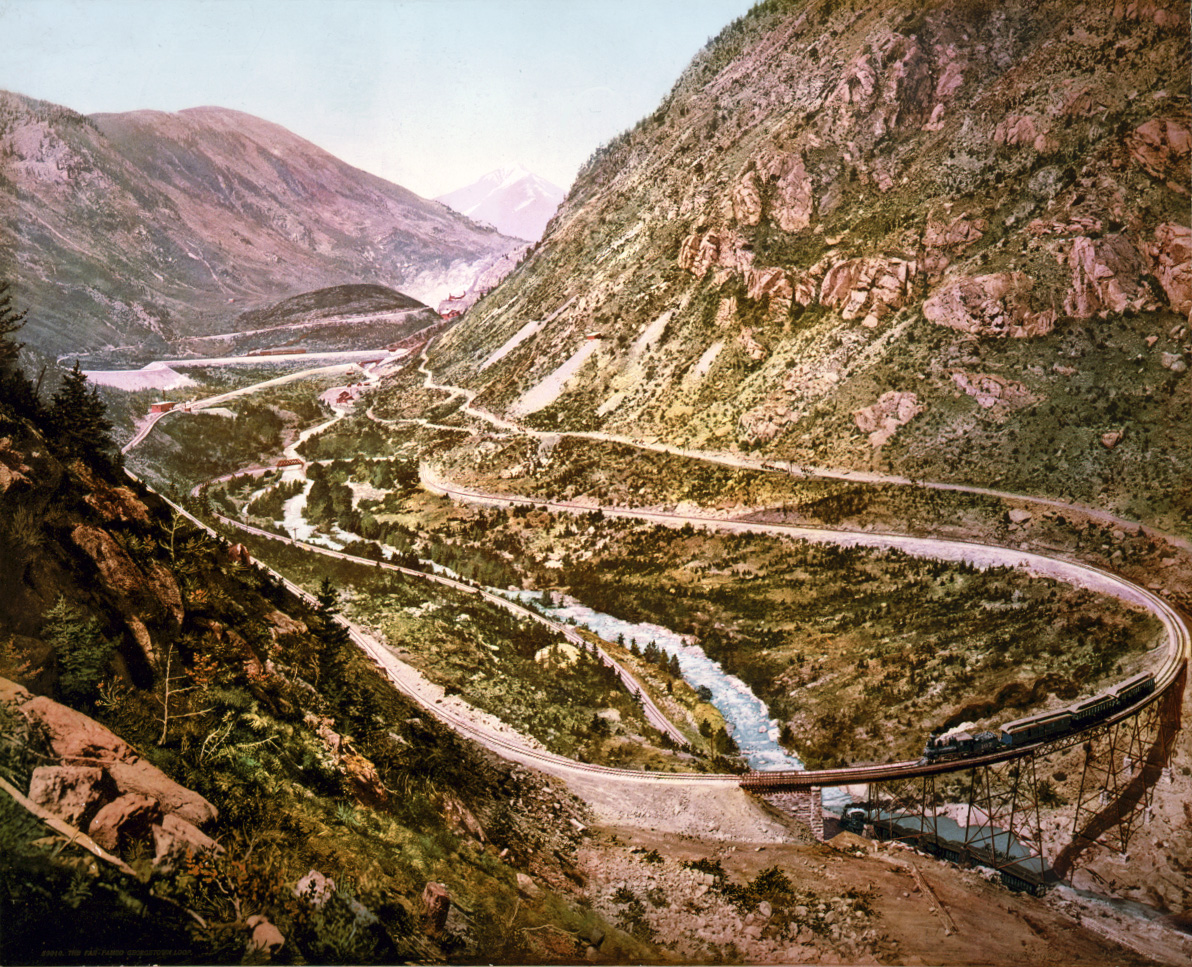
The Georgetown Loop of the Colorado Central Railroad as photographed by William Henry Jackson in 1899

The United States Congress passed an enabling act on March 3, 1875, specifying the requirements for the Territory of Colorado to become a state. On August 1, 1876 (four weeks after the Centennial of the United States), U.S. President Ulysses S. Grant signed a proclamation admitting Colorado to the Union as the 38th state and earning it the moniker "Centennial State".

The discovery of a major silver lode near Leadville in 1878 triggered the Colorado Silver Boom. The Sherman Silver Purchase Act of 1890 invigorated silver mining, and Colorado's last, but greatest, gold strike at Cripple Creek a few months later lured a new generation of gold seekers. Colorado women were granted the right to vote on November 7, 1893, making Colorado the second state to grant universal suffrage and the first one by a popular vote (of Colorado men). The repeal of the Sherman Silver Purchase Act in 1893 led to a staggering collapse of the mining and agricultural economy of Colorado, but the state slowly and steadily recovered. Between the 1880s and 1930s, Denver's floriculture industry developed into a major industry in Colorado. This period became known locally as the Carnation Gold Rush.

=== Twentieth and twenty-first centuries ===
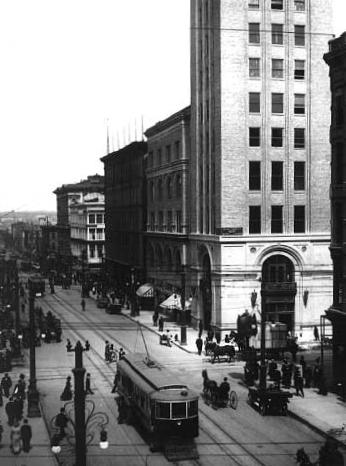
16th Street in Denver in 1912

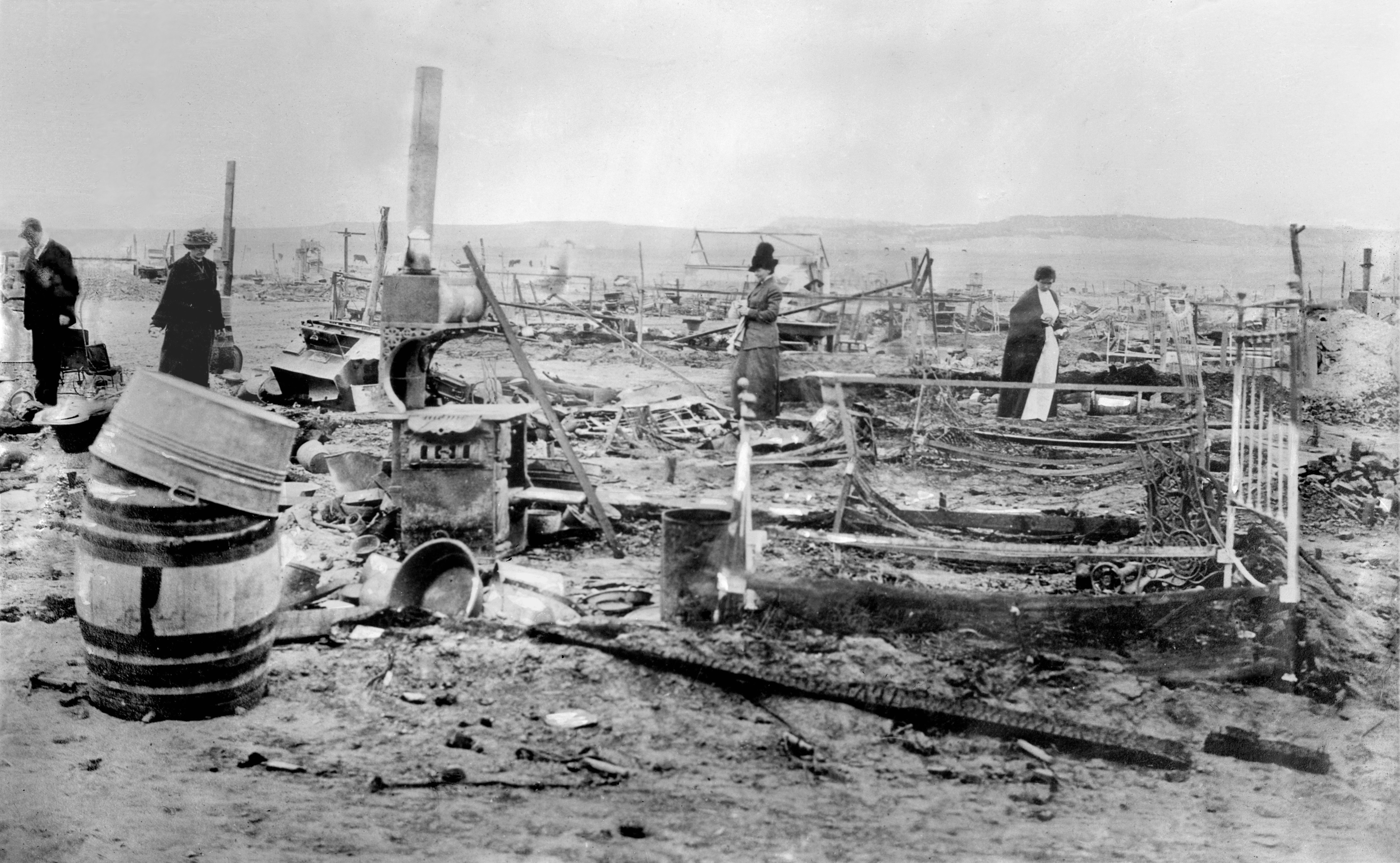
The ruins of the Ludlow Colony in the aftermath of the 1914 massacre.

Poor labor conditions and discontent among miners resulted in several major clashes between strikers and the Colorado National Guard, including the 1903–1904 Western Federation of Miners Strike and Colorado Coalfield War, the latter of which included the Ludlow massacre that killed a dozen women and children. Both the 1913–1914 Coalfield War and the Denver streetcar strike of 1920 resulted in federal troops intervening to end the violence. In 1927, the 1927-28 Colorado coal strike occurred and was ultimately successful in winning a dollar a day increase in wages. During it however the Columbine Mine massacre resulted in six dead strikers following a confrontation with Colorado Rangers. In a separate incident in Trinidad the mayor was accused of deputizing members of the KKK against the striking workers. More than 5,000 Colorado miners—many immigrants—are estimated to have died in accidents since records were first formally collected following an 1884 accident in Crested Butte that killed 59.

In 1924, the Ku Klux Klan Colorado Realm achieved dominance in Colorado politics. With peak membership levels, the Second Klan levied significant control over both the local and state Democrat and Republican parties, particularly in the governor's office and city governments of Denver, Cañon City, and Durango. A particularly strong element of the Klan controlled the Denver Police. Cross burnings became semi-regular occurrences in cities such as Florence and Pueblo. The Klan targeted African-Americans, Catholics, Eastern European immigrants, and other non-White Protestant groups. Efforts by non-Klan lawmen and lawyers including Philip Van Cise led to a rapid decline in the organization's power, with membership waning significantly by the end of the 1920s.

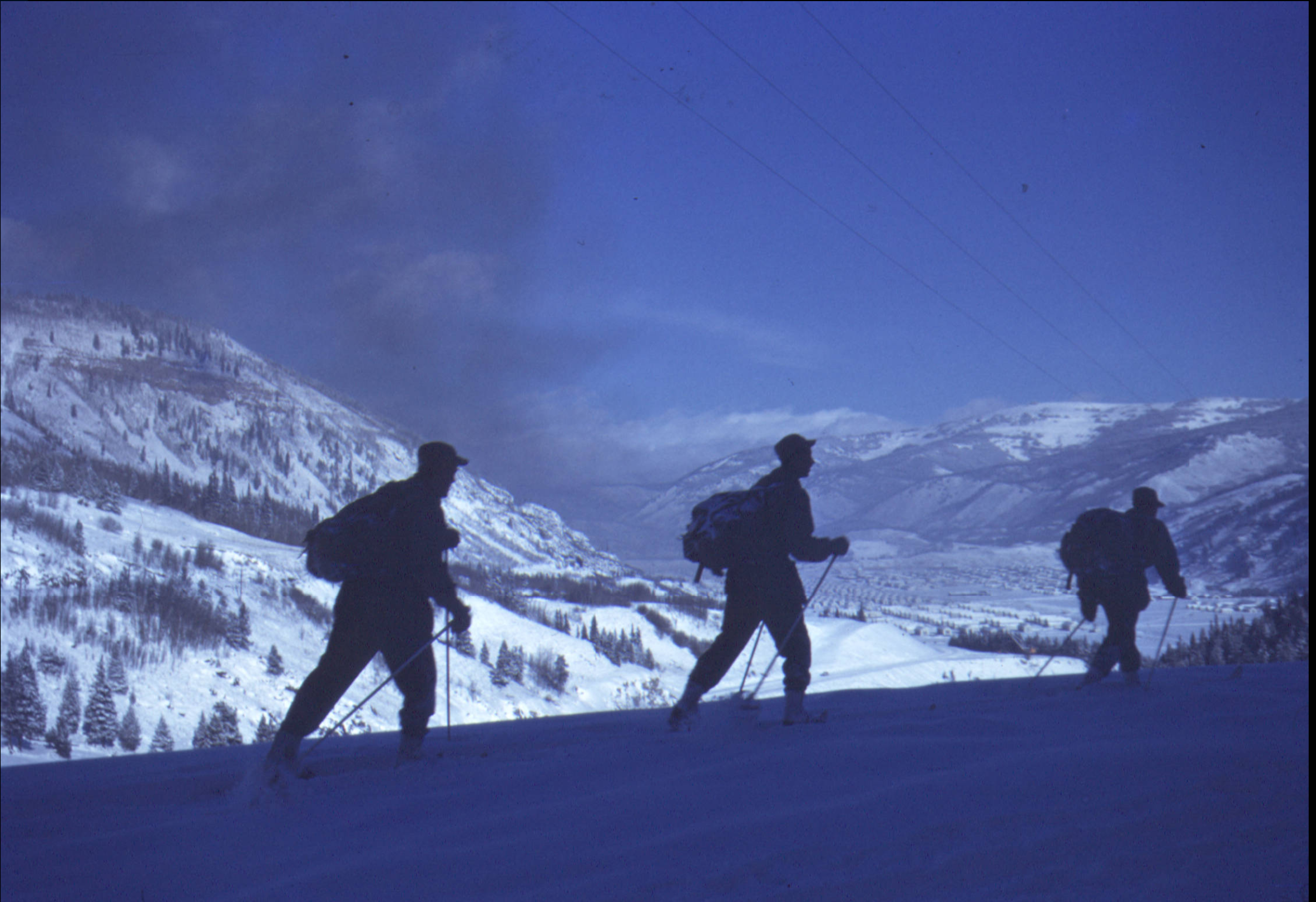
Three 10th Mountain Division skitroopers above Camp Hale in February 1944

Colorado became the first western state to host a major political convention when the Democratic Party met in Denver in 1908. By the U.S. census in 1930, the population of Colorado first exceeded one million residents. Colorado suffered greatly through the Great Depression and the Dust Bowl of the 1930s, but a major wave of immigration following World War II boosted Colorado's fortune. Tourism became a mainstay of the state economy, and high technology became an important economic engine. The United States Census Bureau estimated that the population of Colorado exceeded five million in 2009.

On September 11, 1957, a plutonium fire occurred at the Rocky Flats Plant, which resulted in the significant plutonium contamination of surrounding populated areas.

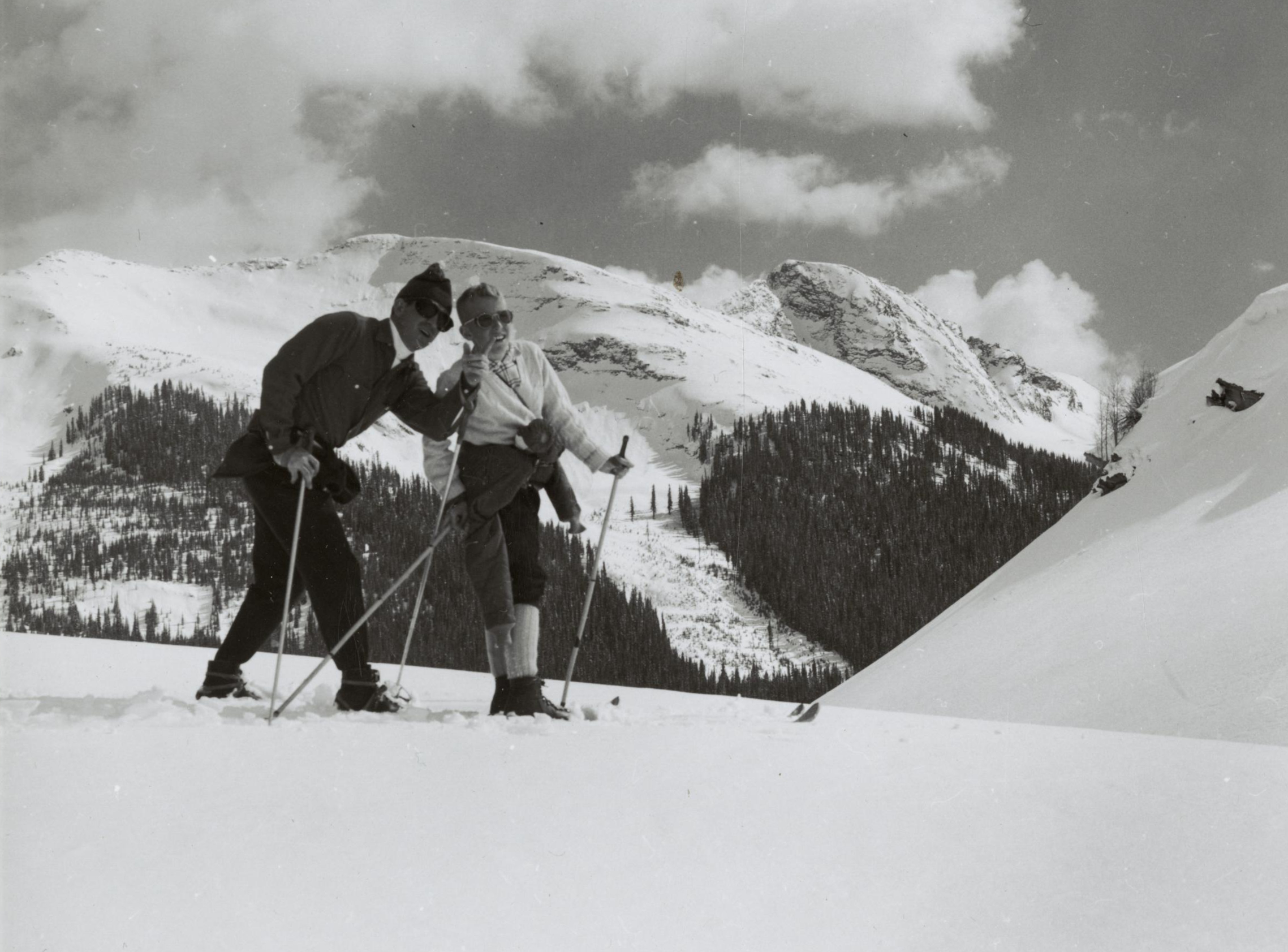
Skiers on Aspen Mountain in 1961

From the 1940s and 1970s, many protest movements gained momentum in Colorado, predominantly in Denver. This included the Chicano Movement, a civil rights, and social movement of Mexican Americans emphasizing a Chicano identity that is widely considered to have begun in Denver. The National Chicano Youth Liberation Conference was held in Colorado in March 1969.

In 1967, Colorado was the first state to loosen restrictions on abortion when governor John Love signed a law allowing abortions in cases of rape, incest, or threats to the woman's mental or physical health. Many states followed Colorado's lead in loosening abortion laws in the 1960s and 1970s.

Since the late 1990s, Colorado has been the site of multiple major mass shootings, including the Columbine High School massacre in 1999, where high school senior students Eric Harris and Dylan Klebold killed 13 (Note: One of the wounded students, Anne Marie Hochhalter, died of her injuries in 2025.) students and one teacher, before committing suicide. The incident made international news, and has since spawned many copycat incidents, known as the Columbine effect. On July 20, 2012, a gunman killed 12 people in a movie theater in Aurora. The state responded with tighter restrictions on firearms, including introducing a limit on magazine capacity. On March 22, 2021, a gunman killed 10 people, including a police officer, in a King Soopers supermarket in Boulder. In an instance of anti-LGBT violence, a gunman killed 5 people at a nightclub in Colorado Springs during the night of November 19–20, 2022.

Four warships of the U.S. Navy have been named the USS Colorado. The first USS Colorado was named for the Colorado River and served in the Civil War and later the Asiatic Squadron, where it was attacked during the 1871 Korean Expedition. The later three ships were named in honor of the state, including an armored cruiser and the battleship USS Colorado, the latter of which was the lead ship of her class and served in World War II in the Pacific beginning in 1941. At the time of the attack on Pearl Harbor, the battleship USS Colorado was located at the naval base in San Diego, California, and thus went unscathed. The most recent vessel to bear the name USS Colorado is Virginia-class submarine USS Colorado (SSN-788), which was commissioned in 2018.

== Geography ==

Colorado is notable for its diverse geography, which includes alpine mountains, high plains, deserts with huge sand dunes, and deep canyons. In 1861, the United States Congress defined the boundaries of the new Territory of Colorado exclusively by lines of latitude and longitude, stretching from 37°N to 41°N latitude, and from 102°02′48″W to 109°02′48″W longitude (25°W to 32°W from the Washington Meridian). After 165 years of government surveys, the borders of Colorado were officially defined by 697 boundary markers and 697 straight boundary lines. Colorado, Wyoming, and Utah are the only states that have their borders defined solely by straight boundary lines with no natural features. The southwest corner of Colorado is the Four Corners Monument at 36°59′56″N, 109°2′43″W. (Note: The official Four Corners Monument is located at 36°59'56.31608″N, 109°2'42.62075"W, 574 feet (175 m) southeast of the 37°N, 109°02′48″W location Congress originally designated.) The Four Corners Monument, located at the place where Colorado, New Mexico, Arizona, and Utah meet, is the only place in the United States where four states meet.

=== Plains ===
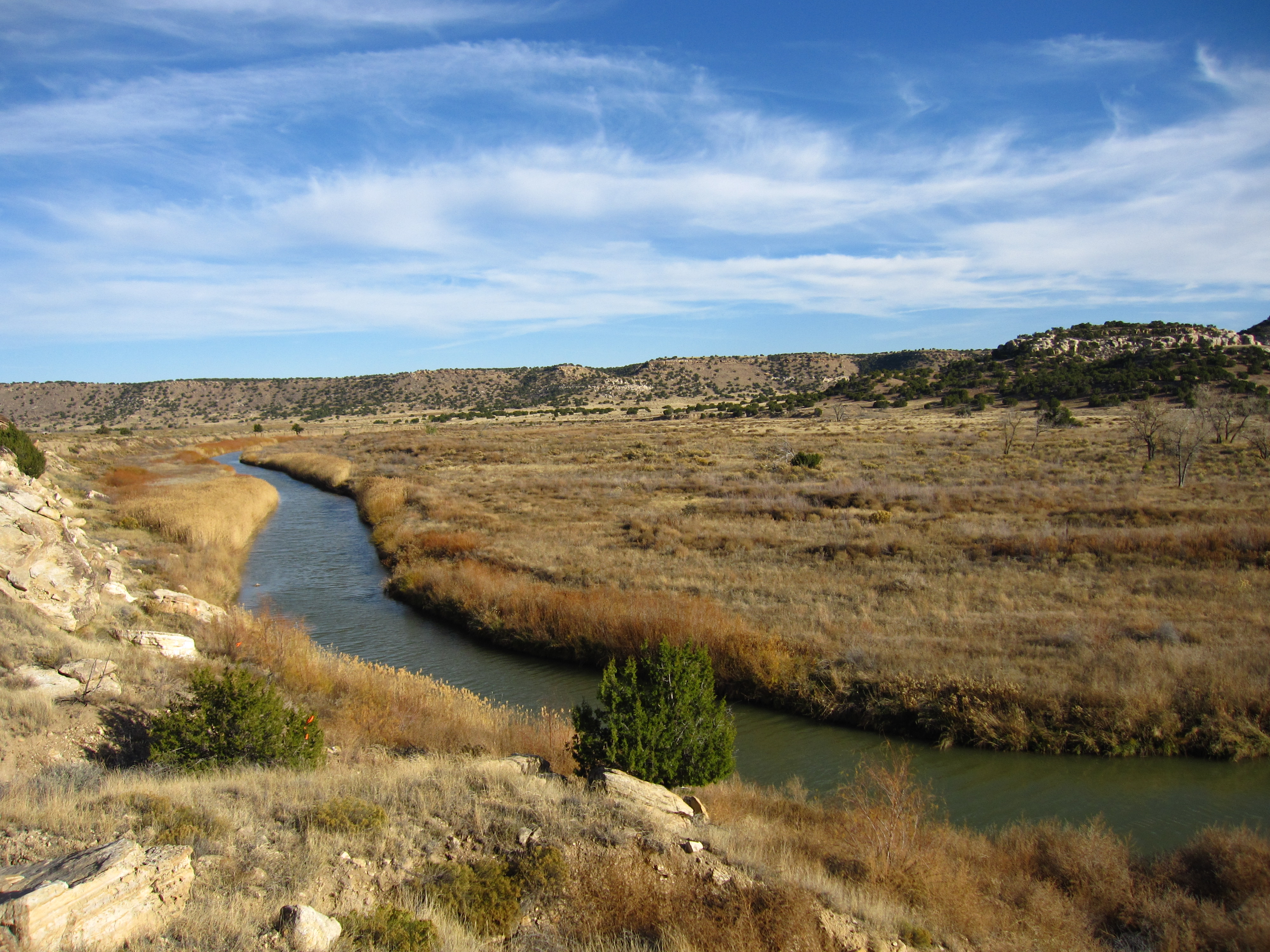
The arid high plains in Southeastern Colorado

Approximately half of Colorado is flat and rolling land. East of the Rocky Mountains is the Colorado Eastern Plains of the High Plains, the section of the Great Plains within Colorado at elevations ranging from roughly 3,350 to 7,500 feet (1,020 to 2,290 m). The Colorado plains are mostly prairies but also include deciduous forests, buttes, and canyons. Precipitation averages 15 to 25 inches (380 to 640 mm) annually.

Eastern Colorado is presently mainly farmland and rangeland, along with small farming villages and towns. Corn, wheat, hay, soybeans, and oats are all typical crops. Most villages and towns in this region boast both a water tower and a grain elevator. Irrigation water is available from both surface and subterranean sources. Surface water sources include the South Platte, the Arkansas River, and a few other streams. Subterranean water is generally accessed through artesian wells. Heavy usage of these wells for irrigation purposes caused underground water reserves to decline in the region. Eastern Colorado also hosts a considerable amount and range of livestock, such as cattle ranches and hog farms.

=== Front Range ===
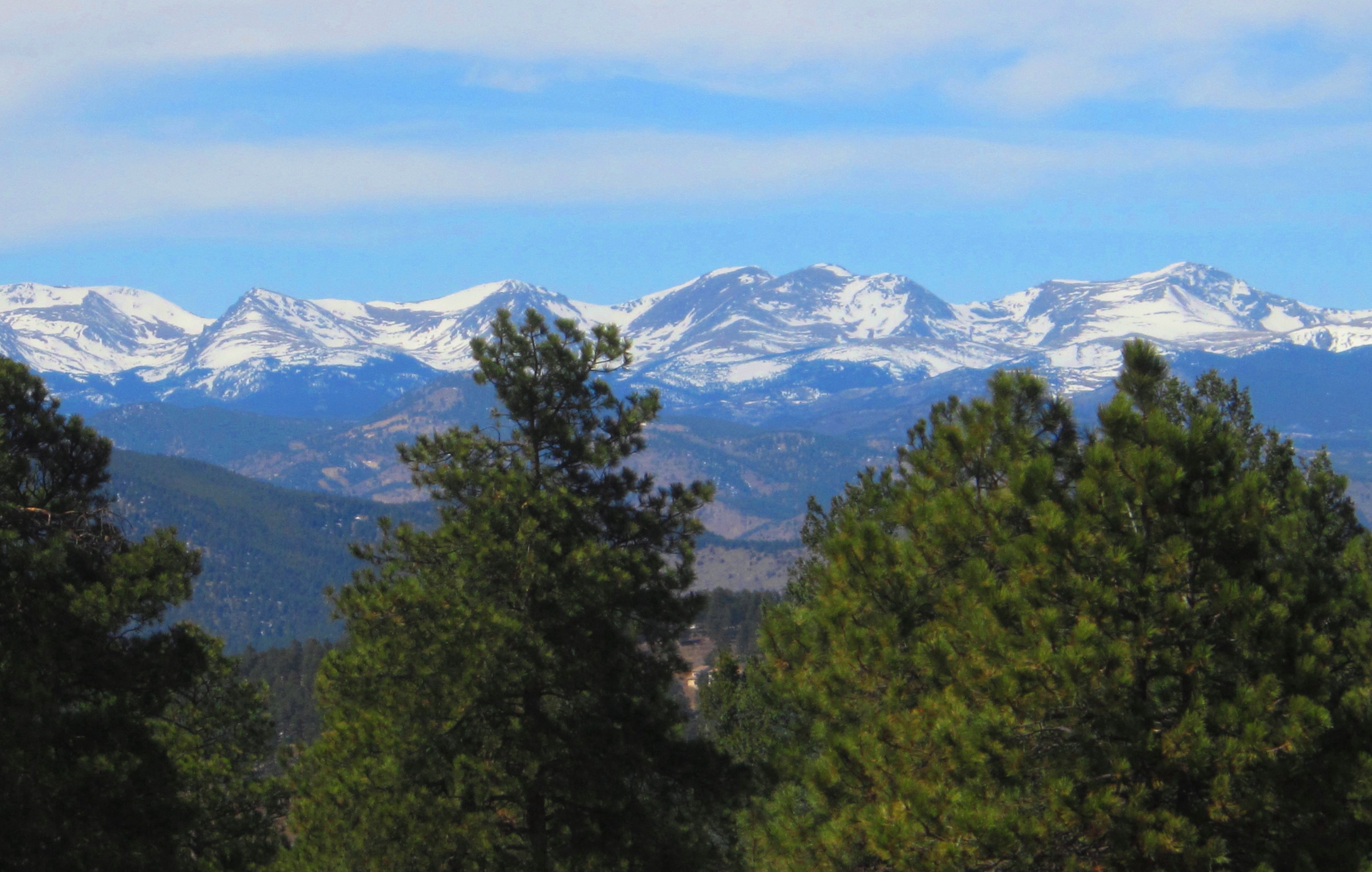
Front Range Peaks west of Denver

About 84% of Colorado's population resides along the eastern edge of the Rocky Mountains in the Front Range Urban Corridor between Cheyenne, Wyoming, and Pueblo, Colorado. This region is partially protected from prevailing storms that blow in from the Pacific Ocean region by the high Rockies in the middle of Colorado. The "Front Range" includes Denver, Boulder, Fort Collins, Loveland, Castle Rock, Colorado Springs, Pueblo, Greeley, and other townships and municipalities in between. On the other side of the Rockies, the significant population centers in western Colorado (which is known as "The Western Slope") are the cities of Grand Junction, Durango, and Montrose.

=== Mountains ===
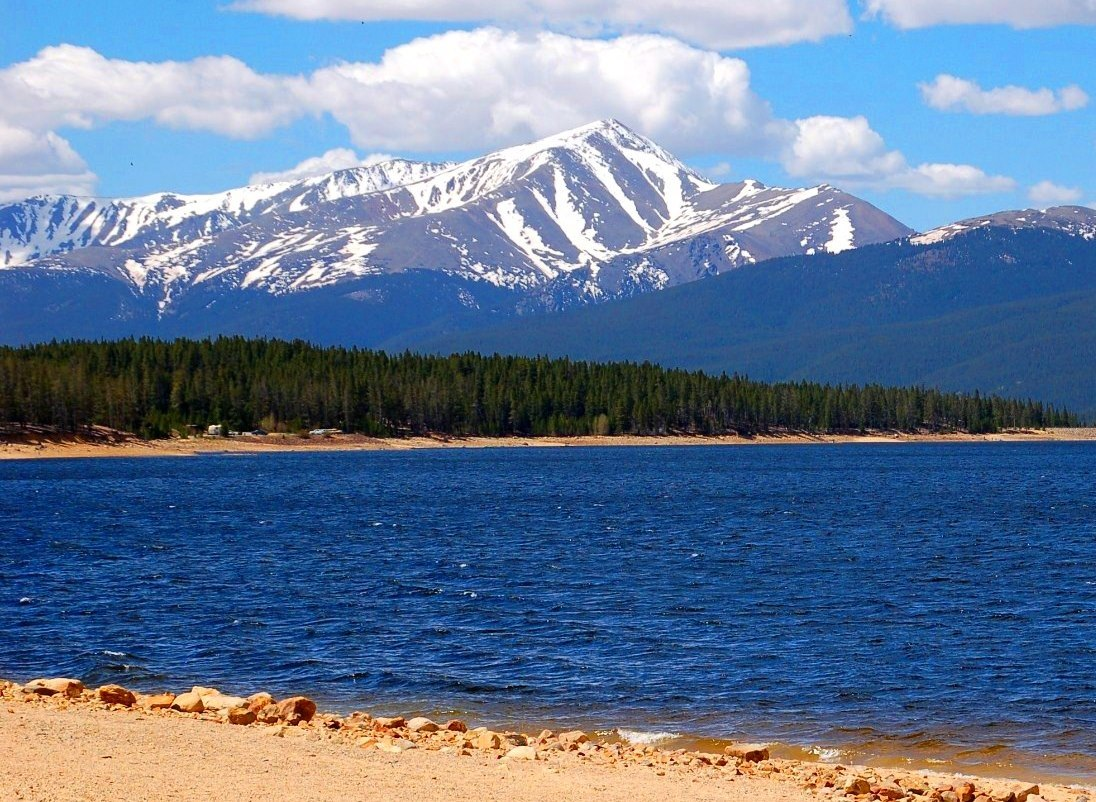
Mount Elbert at 14,440 feet (4,401.2 m) is the highest summit of the Rocky Mountains and Colorado.

To the west of the Great Plains of Colorado rises the eastern slope of the Rocky Mountains. Notable peaks of the Rocky Mountains include Longs Peak, Mount Blue Sky, Pikes Peak, and the Spanish Peaks near Walsenburg, in southern Colorado. This area drains to the east and the southeast, ultimately either via the Mississippi River or the Rio Grande into the Gulf of Mexico.

The Rocky Mountains within Colorado contain 53 true peaks and 58 named peaks that are 14,000 feet (4,267 m) or higher in elevation above sea level, known as fourteeners. These mountains are largely covered with trees such as conifers and aspens up to the tree line, at an elevation of about 12,000 feet (3,658 m) in southern Colorado to about 10,500 feet (3,200 m) in northern Colorado. Above this tree line, only alpine vegetation grows.

Much of the alpine snow melts by mid-August except for a few snow-capped peaks and a few small glaciers. The Colorado Mineral Belt, stretching from the San Juan Mountains in the southwest to Boulder and Central City on the front range, contains most of the historic gold- and silver-mining districts of Colorado. The 30 highest major summits of the Rocky Mountains of North America are all within the state.

The summit of Mount Elbert at 14,437.6 feet (4,400.58 m) elevation in Lake County is the highest point in Colorado and the Rocky Mountains of North America. Colorado is the only U.S. state that lies entirely above 1,000 meters elevation. The point where the Arikaree River flows out of Yuma County, Colorado, and into Cheyenne County, Kansas, is the lowest in Colorado at 3,317 feet (1,011 m) elevation. This point, which is the highest low elevation point of any state, is higher than the high elevation points of 18 states and the District of Columbia.

==== Continental Divide ====
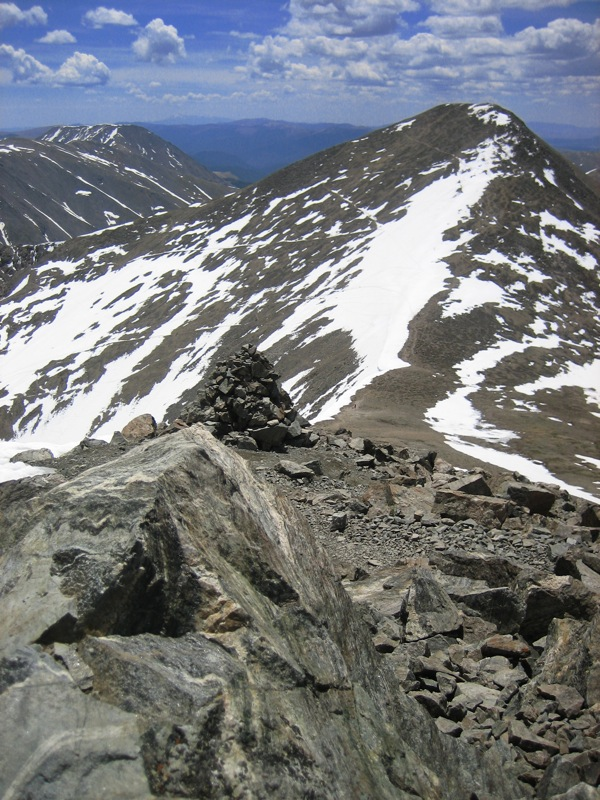
Grays Peak, at 14,278 feet (4,352 m), is the highest point on the Continental Divide in North America.

The Continental Divide of the Americas extends along most of the crest of the Rocky Mountains. The area of Colorado to the west of the Continental Divide is called the Western Slope of Colorado. West of the Continental Divide, water flows to the southwest via the Colorado River and the Green River towards the Gulf of California.

Within the interior of the Rocky Mountains are several large parks which are high broad basins. In the north, on the east side of the Continental Divide is the North Park of Colorado. The North Park is drained by the North Platte River, which flows north into Wyoming and Nebraska. Just to the south of North Park, but on the western side of the Continental Divide, is the Middle Park of Colorado, which is drained by the Colorado River. The South Park of Colorado is the region of the headwaters of the South Platte River.

=== South Central region ===
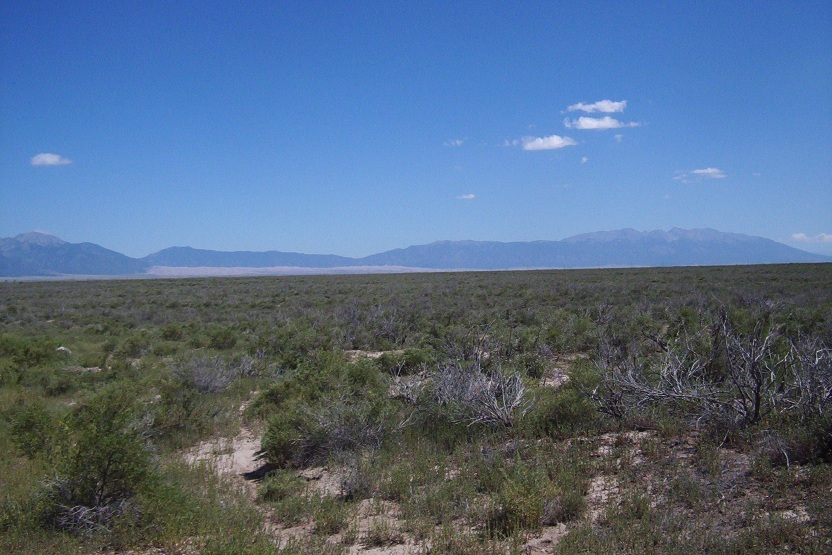
The high desert lands that make up the San Luis Valley in Southern Colorado

In south-central Colorado is the large San Luis Valley, where the headwaters of the Rio Grande are located. The northern part of the valley is the San Luis Closed Basin, an endorheic basin that helped create the Great Sand Dunes. The valley sits between the Sangre de Cristo Mountains and San Juan Mountains. The Rio Grande drains due south into New Mexico, Texas, and Mexico. Across the Sangre de Cristo Range to the east of the San Luis Valley lies the Wet Mountain Valley. These basins, particularly the San Luis Valley, lie along the Rio Grande rift, a major geological formation of the Rocky Mountains, and its branches.

=== Western Slope ===
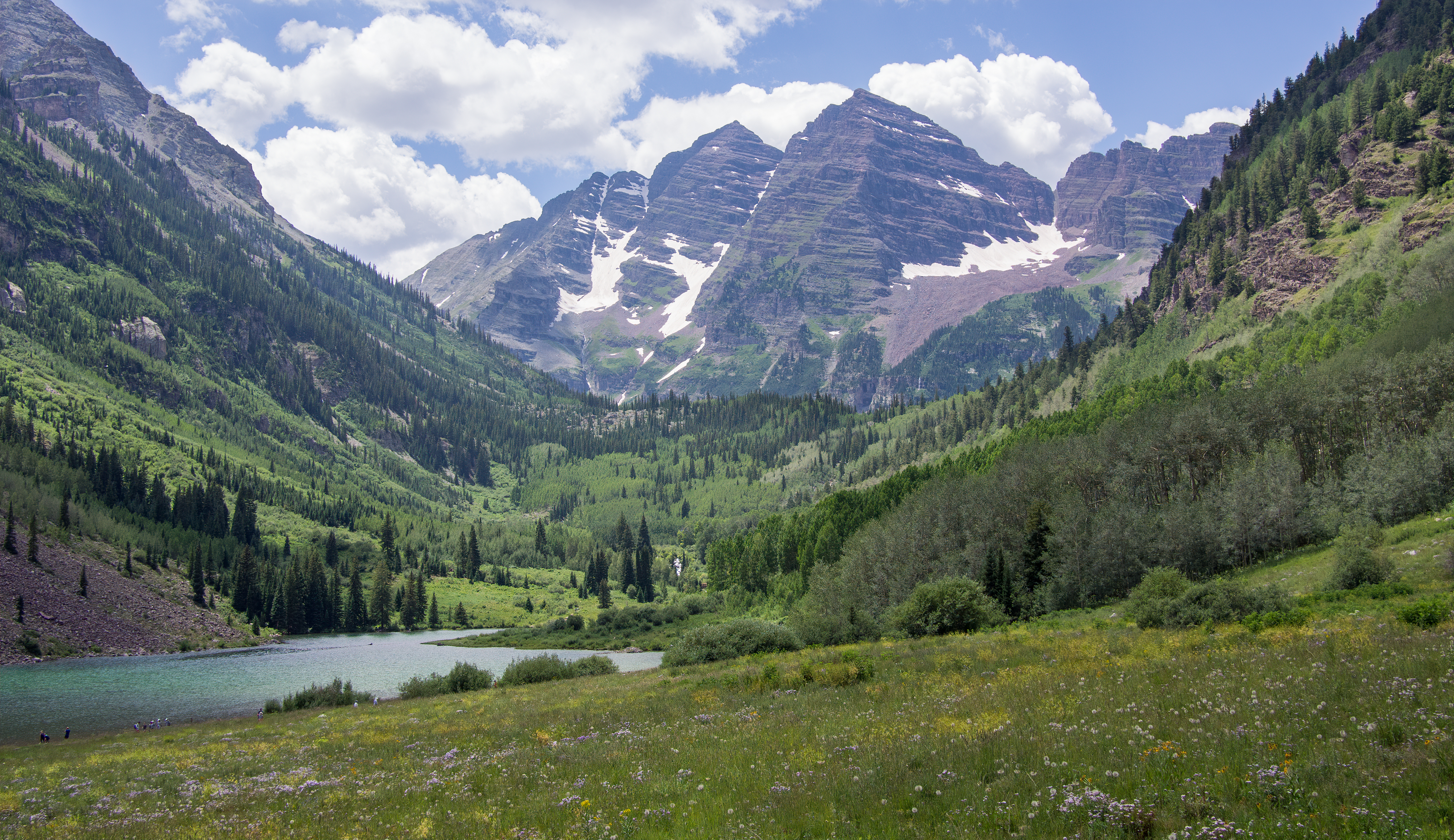
Maroon Bells, at 14,163 ft (4,317 m), is part of White River National Forest and a tourist destination

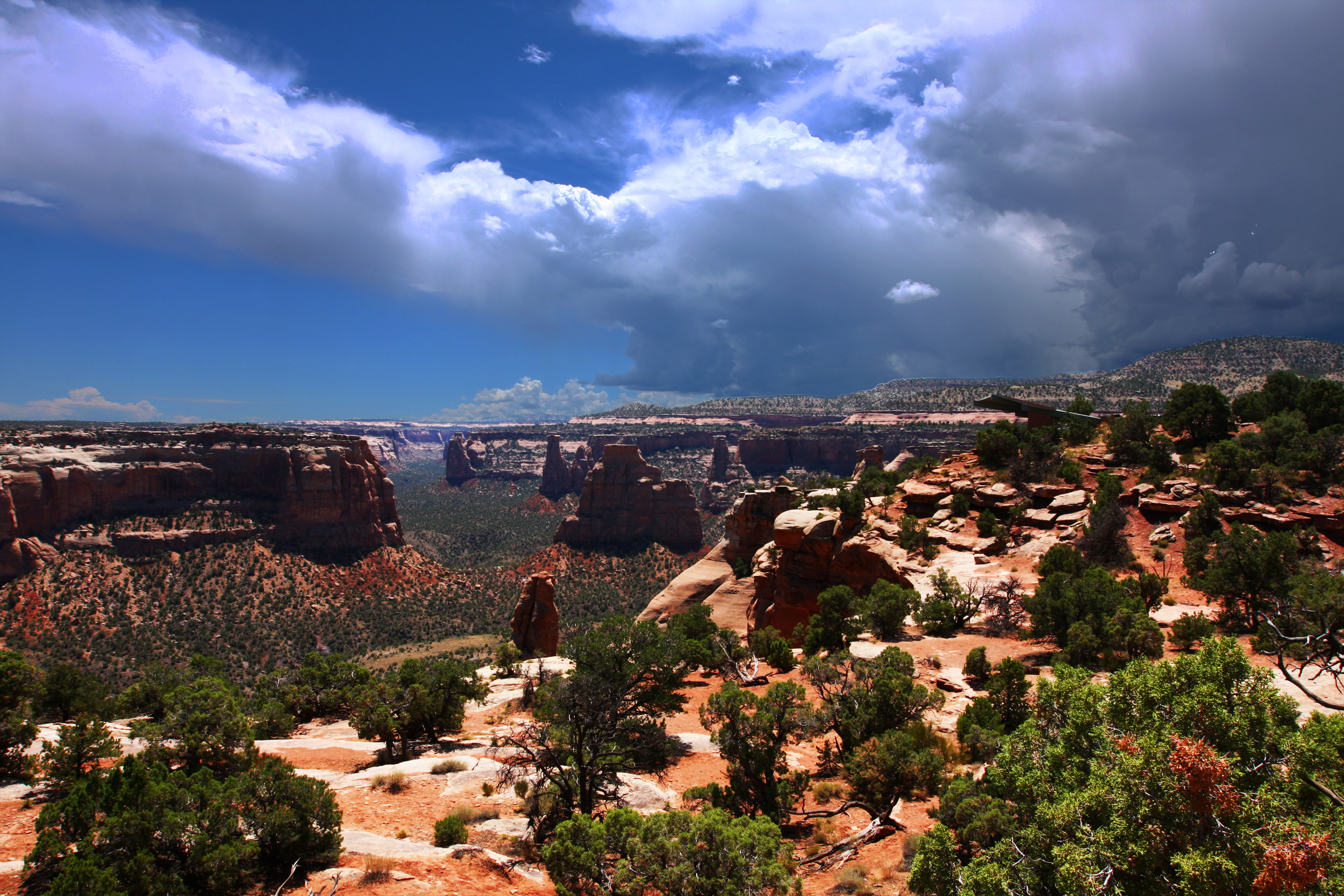
The Colorado National Monument near Grand Junction is made up of high desert canyons and sandstone rock formations.

The Western Slope of Colorado includes the western face of the Rocky Mountains and all of the area to the western border. This area includes several terrains and climates from alpine mountains to arid deserts. The Western Slope includes many ski resort towns in the Rocky Mountains and towns west to Utah. It is less populous than the Front Range but includes a large number of national parks and monuments.

The northwestern corner of Colorado is a sparsely populated region, (Note: the U.S. Census Bureau Quick facts reference link here has all northwestern counties in Colorado. It shows the Population density, which is low for each county, meaning that Northwestern Colorado is sparsely populated.) and it contains part of the noted Dinosaur National Monument, which not only is a paleontological area, but is also a scenic area of rocky hills, canyons, arid desert, and streambeds. Here, the Green River briefly crosses over into Colorado.

The Western Slope of Colorado is drained by the Colorado River and its tributaries (primarily the Gunnison River, Green River, and the San Juan River). The Colorado River flows through Glenwood Canyon, and then through an arid valley made up of desert from Rifle to Parachute, through the desert canyon of De Beque Canyon, and into the arid desert of Grand Valley, where the city of Grand Junction is located.^{,}

Also prominent is the Grand Mesa, which lies to the southeast of Grand Junction; the high San Juan Mountains, a rugged mountain range; and to the north and west of the San Juan Mountains, the Colorado Plateau.

Grand Junction, Colorado, at the confluence of the Colorado and Gunnison Rivers, is the largest city on the Western Slope. Grand Junction and Durango are the only major centers of television broadcasting west of the Continental Divide in Colorado, though most mountain resort communities publish daily newspapers. Grand Junction is located at the juncture of Interstate 70 and US 50, the only major highways in western Colorado. Grand Junction is also along the major railroad of the Western Slope, the Union Pacific. This railroad also provides the tracks for Amtrak's California Zephyr passenger train, which crosses the Rocky Mountains between Denver and Grand Junction.

The Western Slope includes multiple notable destinations in the Colorado Rocky Mountains, including Glenwood Springs, with its resort hot springs, and the ski resorts of Aspen, Breckenridge, Vail, Crested Butte, Steamboat Springs, and Telluride.

Higher education in western and southwestern Colorado includes Colorado Mesa University in Grand Junction, Western Colorado University in Gunnison, Fort Lewis College in Durango, and Colorado Mountain College campuses in Glenwood Springs and Steamboat Springs.

The Four Corners Monument in the southwest corner of Colorado marks the common boundary of Colorado, New Mexico, Arizona, and Utah, the only such place in the United States.

== Climate ==
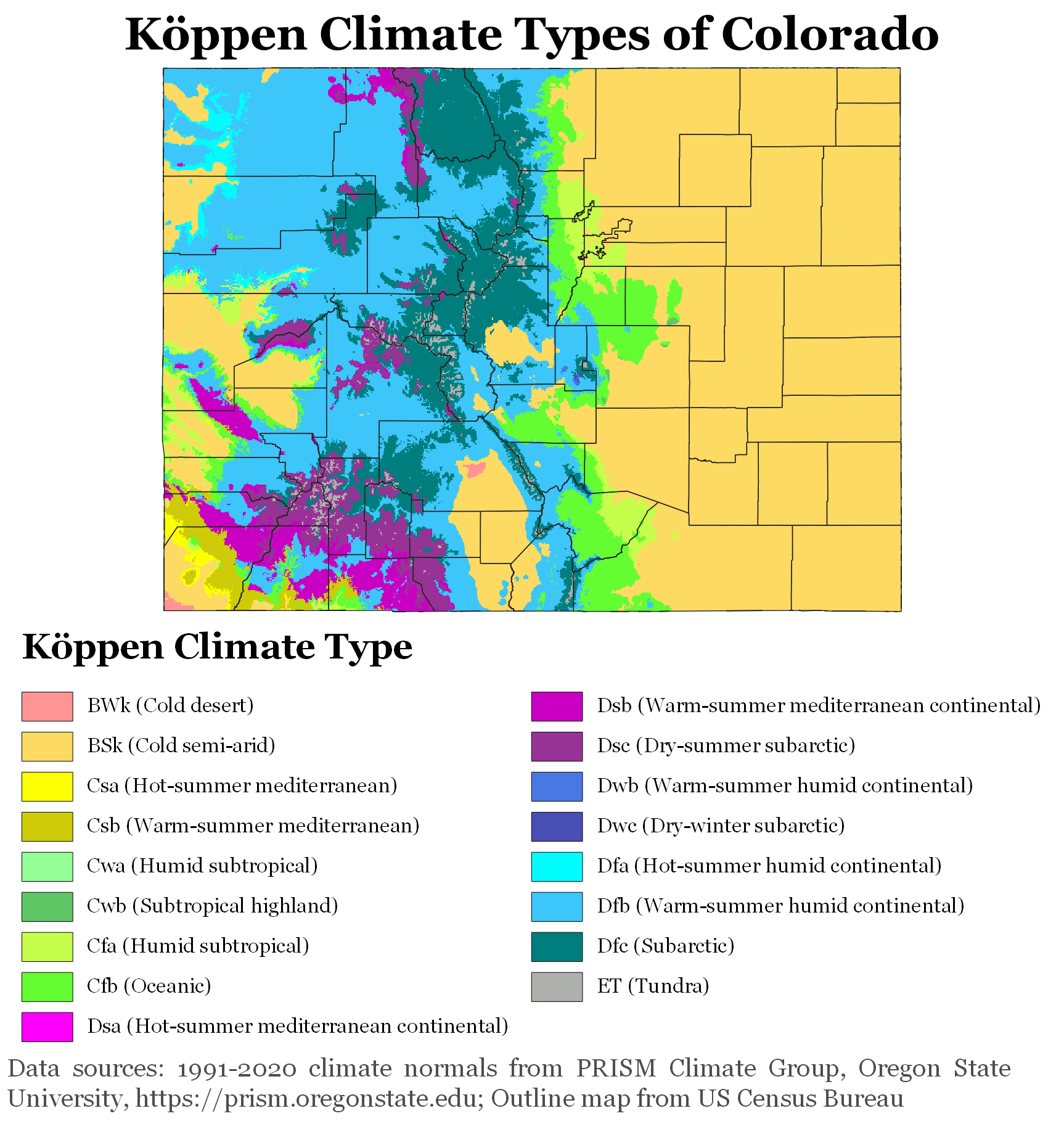
Köppen climate types of Colorado, using 1991–2020 climate normals

The climate of Colorado is more complex than states outside of the Mountain States region. Unlike most other states, southern Colorado is not always warmer than northern Colorado. Most of Colorado is made up of mountains, foothills, high plains, and desert lands. Mountains and surrounding valleys greatly affect the local climate. Northeast, east, and southeast Colorado are mostly the high plains, while Northern Colorado is a mix of high plains, foothills, and mountains. Northwest and west Colorado are predominantly mountainous, with some desert lands mixed in. Southwest and southern Colorado are a complex mixture of desert and mountain areas.

=== Eastern Plains ===
The climate of the Eastern Plains is semi-arid (Köppen climate classification: BSk) with low humidity and moderate precipitation, usually from 15 to 25 inches (380 to 640 mm) annually, although many areas near the rivers are semi-humid climate. The area is known for its abundant sunshine and cool, clear nights, which give this area a great average diurnal temperature range. The difference between the highs of the days and the lows of the nights can be considerable as warmth dissipates to space during clear nights, the heat radiation not being trapped by clouds. The Front Range urban corridor, where most of the population of Colorado resides, lies in a pronounced precipitation shadow as a result of being on the lee side of the Rocky Mountains.

In summer, this area can have many days above 95 °F (35 °C) and often 100 °F (38 °C). On the plains, the winter lows usually range from 25 to −10 °F (−4 to −23 °C). About 75% of the precipitation falls within the growing season, from April to September, but this area is very prone to droughts. Most of the precipitation comes from thunderstorms, which can be severe, and from major snowstorms that occur in the winter and early spring. Otherwise, winters tend to be mostly dry and cold.

In much of the region, March is the snowiest month. April and May are normally the rainiest months, while April is the wettest month overall. The Front Range cities closer to the mountains tend to be warmer in the winter due to Chinook winds which warm the area, sometimes bringing temperatures of 70 °F (21 °C) or higher in the winter. The average July temperature is 55 °F (13 °C) in the morning and 90 °F (32 °C) in the afternoon. The average January temperature is 18 °F (−8 °C) in the morning and 48 °F (9 °C) in the afternoon, although variation between consecutive days can be 40 °F (4 °C).

=== Front Range foothills ===
Just west of the plains and into the foothills, there is a wide variety of climate types. Locations merely a few miles apart can experience entirely different weather depending on the topography. Most valleys have a semi-arid climate, not unlike the eastern plains, which transitions to an alpine climate at the highest elevations. Microclimates also exist in local areas that run nearly the entire spectrum of climates, including subtropical highland (Cfb/Cwb), humid subtropical (Cfa), humid continental (Dfa/Dfb), Mediterranean (Csa/Csb) and subarctic (Dfc).

=== Extreme weather ===
Extreme weather changes are common in Colorado, although a significant portion of the extreme weather occurs in the least populated areas of the state. Thunderstorms are common east of the Continental Divide in the spring and summer, yet are usually brief. Hail is a common sight in the mountains east of the Divide and across the eastern Plains, especially the northeast part of the state. Hail is the most commonly reported warm-season severe weather hazard, and occasionally causes human injuries, as well as significant property damage. The eastern Plains are subject to some of the biggest hail storms in North America. Notable examples are the severe hailstorms that hit Denver on July 11, 1990, and May 8, 2017, the latter being the costliest ever in the state.

The Eastern Plains are part of the extreme western portion of Tornado Alley; some damaging tornadoes in the Eastern Plains include the 1990 Limon F3 tornado and the 2008 Windsor EF3 tornado, which devastated a small town. Portions of the eastern Plains see especially frequent tornadoes, both those spawned from mesocyclones in supercell thunderstorms and from less intense landspouts, such as within the Denver convergence vorticity zone (DCVZ).

The Plains are also susceptible to occasional floods and particularly severe flash floods, which are caused both by thunderstorms and by the rapid melting of snow in the mountains during warm weather. Notable examples include the 1965 Denver Flood, the Big Thompson River flooding of 1976 and the 2013 Colorado floods. Hot weather is common during summers in Denver. The city's record in 1901 for the number of consecutive days above 90 °F (32 °C) was broken during the summer of 2008. The new record of 24 consecutive days surpassed the previous record by almost a week.

Much of Colorado is very dry, with the state averaging only 17 inches (430 mm) of precipitation per year statewide. The state rarely experiences a time when some portion is not in some degree of drought. The lack of precipitation contributes to the severity of wildfires in the state, such as the Hayman Fire of 2002. Other notable fires include the Fourmile Canyon Fire of 2010, the Waldo Canyon Fire and High Park Fire of June 2012, and the Black Forest Fire of June 2013. Even these fires were exceeded in severity by the Pine Gulch Fire, Cameron Peak Fire, and East Troublesome Fire in 2020, all being the three largest fires in Colorado history (see 2020 Colorado wildfires). And the Marshall Fire which started on December 30, 2021, while not the largest in state history, was the most destructive ever in terms of property loss (see Marshall Fire).

However, some of the mountainous regions of Colorado receive a huge amount of moisture from winter snowfalls. The spring melts of these snows often cause great waterflows in the Yampa River, the Colorado River, the Rio Grande, the Arkansas River, the North Platte River, and the South Platte River.

Water flowing out of the Colorado Rocky Mountains is a very significant source of water for the farms, towns, and cities of the southwest states of New Mexico, Arizona, Utah, and Nevada, as well as the Midwest, such as Nebraska and Kansas, and the southern states of Oklahoma and Texas. A significant amount of water is also diverted for use in California; occasionally (formerly naturally and consistently), the flow of water reaches northern Mexico.

=== Climate change ===
Climate change in Colorado encompasses the effects of climate change, attributed to man-made increases in atmospheric greenhouse gases, in the U.S. state of Colorado.

In 2019 The Denver Post reported that "[i]ndividuals living in southeastern Colorado are more vulnerable to potential health effects from climate change than residents in other parts of the state".

According to the EPA, Colorado’s climate has undergone many changes over the course of past decades. Snow is melting frequently, heat waves are more prevalent, and these rising temperatures and droughts are having negative effects on many of the ecosystems in the state. These effects are increasing the fire season, increasing the ability of insects to make it through the winter enabling outbreaks, and impacting the health of soils within the state. The effects of climate change in Colorado are likely to continue to reduce water availability and increase wildfires frequency into the future.

=== Records ===
The highest official ambient air temperature ever recorded in Colorado was 115 °F (46.1 °C) on July 20, 2019, at John Martin Dam. The lowest official air temperature was −61 °F (−51.7 °C) on February 1, 1985, at Maybell.

Monthly normal high and low temperatures for various Colorado cities(°F) (°C)
City	Jan	Feb	Mar	Apr	May	Jun	Jul	Aug	Sep	Oct	Nov	Dec
Alamosa	34/−2; 2/−19	40/6; 4/−14	50/17; 10/−8	59/24; 15/−4	69/33; 21/1	79/41; 26/5	82/47; 28/8	80/46; 27/8	73/40; 23/4	62/25; 17/−4	47/12; 8/−11	35/1; 2/−17
Colorado Springs	43/18; 6/−8	45/20; 7/−7	52/26; 11/−3	60/33; 16/1	69/43; 21/6	79/51; 26/11	85/57; 29/14	82/56; 28/13	75/47; 24/8	63/36; 17/2	51/25; 11/−4	42/18; 6/−8
Denver	49/20; 9/−7	49/21; 9/−6	56/29; 13/−2	64/35; 18/2	73/46; 23/8	84/54; 29/12	92/61; 33/16	89/60; 32/16	81/50; 27/10	68/37; 20/3	55/26; 13/−3	47/18; 8/−8
Grand Junction	38/17; 3/−8	45/24; 7/−4	57/31; 14/-1	65/38; 18/3	76/47; 24/8	88/56; 31/13	93/63; 34/17	90/61; 32/16	80/52; 27/11	66/40; 19/4	51/28; 11/−2	39/19; 4/−7
Pueblo	47/14; 8/−10	51/17; 11/−8	59/26; 15/−3	67/34; 19/1	77/44; 25/7	87/53; 31/12	93/59; 34/15	90/58; 32/14	82/48; 28/9	69/34; 21/1	56/23; 13/−5	46/14; 8/−10

=== Extreme temperatures ===
Climate data for Colorado
Month	Jan	Feb	Mar	Apr	May	Jun	Jul	Aug	Sep	Oct	Nov	Dec	Year
Record high °F (°C)	84 (29)	90 (32)	99 (37)	100 (38)	107 (42)	114 (46)	115 (46)	112 (44)	108 (42)	100 (38)	93 (34)	88 (31)	115 (46)
Record low °F (°C)	−60 (−51)	−61 (−52)	−46 (−43)	−35 (−37)	−11 (−24)	3 (−16)	10 (−12)	5 (−15)	−9 (−23)	−28 (−33)	−41 (−41)	−53 (−47)	−61 (−52)
Source: Colorado Climate Center

=== Earthquakes ===
Despite its mountainous terrain, Colorado experiences less seismic activity than states like California and Alaska. There are over 90 potentially active faults, and since 1867, Colorado has experienced 700 recorded earthquakes of magnitude 2.5 or higher. The U.S. National Earthquake Information Center is located in Golden.

On August 22, 2011, a 5.3 magnitude earthquake occurred 9 miles (14 km) west-southwest of the city of Trinidad. There were no casualties and only a small amount of damage was reported. It was the second-largest earthquake in Colorado's history, the largest being a magnitude 6.6 earthquake, recorded in 1882. Four minor earthquakes rattled Colorado on August 24, 2018, ranging from magnitude 2.9 to 4.3. As of June 2020, there were 525 recorded earthquakes in Colorado since 1973, a majority of which range 2 to 3.5 on the Richter scale.

== Fauna ==
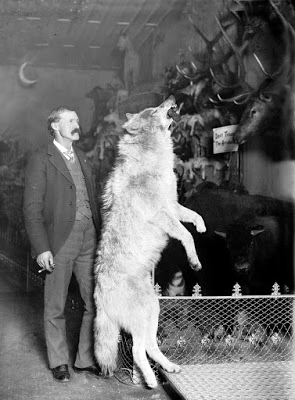
Breckenridge naturalist Edwin Carter with a mounted gray wolf killed in the Colorado Rockies, c. 1890–1900

A process of extirpation by trapping and poisoning of the gray wolf (Canis lupus) from Colorado in the 1930s saw the last wild wolf in the state shot in 1945. A wolf pack recolonized Moffat County, Colorado in northwestern Colorado in 2019. Cattle farmers have expressed concern that a returning wolf population potentially threatens their herds. Coloradans voted to reintroduce gray wolves in 2020, with the state committing to a plan to have a population in the state by 2022 and permitting non-lethal methods of driving off wolves attacking livestock and pets.

While there is fossil evidence of Harrington's mountain goat in Colorado between at least 800,000 years ago and its extinction with megafauna roughly 11,000 years ago, the mountain goat is not native to Colorado but was instead introduced to the state over time during the interval between 1947 and 1972. Despite being an artificially-introduced species, the state declared mountain goats a native species in 1993. In 2013, 2014, and 2019, an unknown illness killed nearly all mountain goat kids, leading to a Colorado Parks and Wildlife investigation.

The native population of pronghorn in Colorado has varied wildly over the last century, reaching a low of only 15,000 individuals during the 1960s. However, conservation efforts succeeded in bringing the stable population back up to roughly 66,000 by 2013. The population was estimated to have reached 85,000 by 2019 and had increasingly more run-ins with the increased suburban housing along the eastern Front Range. State wildlife officials suggested that landowners would need to modify fencing to allow the greater number of pronghorns to move unabated through the newly developed land. Pronghorns are most readily found in the northern and eastern portions of the state, with some populations also in the western San Juan Mountains.

Common wildlife found in the mountains of Colorado include mule deer, southwestern red squirrel, golden-mantled ground squirrel, yellow-bellied marmot, moose, American pika, and red fox, all at exceptionally high numbers, though moose are not native to the state. The foothills include deer, fox squirrel, desert cottontail, mountain cottontail, and coyote. The prairies are home to black-tailed prairie dog, the endangered swift fox, American badger, and white-tailed jackrabbit.

== Government ==
=== State government ===
State Executive Officers
Office	Name	Party
Governor	Jared Polis	Democratic
Lieutenant Governor	Dianne Primavera	Democratic
Secretary of State	Jena Griswold	Democratic
Attorney General	Phil Weiser	Democratic
Treasurer	Dave Young	Democratic

Like the federal government and all other U.S. states, Colorado's state constitution provides for three branches of government: the legislative, the executive, and the judicial branches.

The Governor of Colorado heads the state's executive branch. The current governor is Jared Polis, a Democrat. Colorado's other statewide elected executive officers are the Lieutenant Governor of Colorado (elected on a ticket with the Governor), Secretary of State of Colorado, Colorado State Treasurer, and Attorney General of Colorado, all of whom serve four-year terms.

The seven-member Colorado Supreme Court is the state's highest court. The Colorado Court of Appeals, with 22 judges, sits in divisions of three judges each. Colorado is divided into 23 judicial districts, each of which has a district court and a county court with limited jurisdiction. The state also has specialized water courts, which sit in seven distinct divisions around the state and which decide matters relating to water rights and the use and administration of water.

The state legislative body is the Colorado General Assembly, which is made up of two houses – the House of Representatives and the Senate. The House has 65 members and the Senate has 35. As of April 2026, the Democratic Party holds a 23 to 12 majority in the Senate and a 43 to 22 majority in the House.

Most Coloradans are native to other states (nearly 60% according to the 2000 census), and this is illustrated by the fact that the state did not have a native-born governor from 1975 (when John David Vanderhoof left office) until 2007, when Bill Ritter took office; his election the previous year marked the first electoral victory for a native-born Coloradan in a gubernatorial race since 1958 (Vanderhoof had ascended from the Lieutenant Governorship when John Arthur Love was given a position in Richard Nixon's administration in 1973).

State sales taxes and many state-collected local sales taxes are administered and collected by the Colorado Department of Revenue.

==== Politics ====
Colorado registered voters as of June 1, 2025
Party	Number of voters	Percentage
Unaffiliated	2,011,247	49.20%
Democratic	1,039,477	25.43%
Republican	940,271	23.00%
Libertarian	37,166	0.91%
No Labels	26,843	0.65%
American Constitution	11,725	0.29%
Green	8,635	0.21%
Approval Voting	5,067	0.12%
Unity	4,087	0.10%
Center	3,674	0.09%
Total	4,087,582	100.00%

Colorado was once considered a swing state, but has become a relatively safe blue state in both state and federal elections since the late 2010s. In presidential elections, it had not been won until 2020 by double digits since 1984 and has backed the winning candidate in 9 of the last 11 elections. Coloradans have elected 17 Democrats and 12 Republicans to the governorship in the last 100 years.

In presidential politics, Colorado was considered a reliably Republican state during the post-World War II era, voting for the Democratic candidate only in 1948, 1964, and 1992. However, it became a competitive swing state in the 1990s. Since the mid-2000s, it has swung heavily to the Democrats, voting for Barack Obama in 2008 and 2012, Hillary Clinton in 2016, Joe Biden in 2020, and Kamala Harris in 2024.

Colorado politics exhibits a contrast between conservative cities such as Colorado Springs and Grand Junction, and liberal cities such as Boulder and Denver. Democrats are strongest in metropolitan Denver, the college towns of Fort Collins and Boulder, southern Colorado (including Pueblo), and several western ski resort counties. The Republicans are strongest in the Eastern Plains, Colorado Springs, Greeley, and far Western Colorado near Grand Junction.

Colorado is represented by two members of the United States Senate:

- Class 2, John Hickenlooper (Democratic), since 2021
- Class 3, Michael Bennet (Democratic), since 2009

Colorado is represented by eight members of the United States House of Representatives:

- 1st district: Diana DeGette (Democratic), since 1997
- 2nd district: Joe Neguse (Democratic), since 2019
- 3rd district: Jeff Hurd (Republican), since 2025
- 4th district: Lauren Boebert (Republican), since 2025 (3rd district 2021–2025)
- 5th district: Jeff Crank (Republican), since 2025
- 6th district: Jason Crow (Democratic), since 2019
- 7th district: Brittany Pettersen (Democratic), since 2023
- 8th district: Gabe Evans (Republican), since 2025

In a 2020 study, Colorado was ranked as the seventh easiest state for citizens to vote in.

==== Significant initiatives and legislation enacted in Colorado ====
Colorado was the first state in the union to enact, by voter referendum, a law extending suffrage to women. That initiative was approved by the state's voters on November 7, 1893.

On the November 8, 1932, ballot, Colorado approved the repeal of alcohol prohibition more than a year before the Twenty-first Amendment to the United States Constitution was ratified.

Colorado has banned, via C.R.S. section 12-6-302, the sale of motor vehicles on Sunday since at least 1953.

In 1972, Colorado voters rejected a referendum proposal to fund the 1976 Winter Olympics, which had been scheduled to be held in the state. Denver had been chosen by the International Olympic Committee as the host city on May 12, 1970.

In 1992, by a margin of 53 to 47 percent, Colorado voters approved an amendment to the state constitution (Amendment 2) that would have prevented any city, town, or county in the state from taking any legislative, executive, or judicial action to recognize homosexuals or bisexuals as a protected class. In 1996, in a 6–3 ruling in Romer v. Evans, the U.S. Supreme Court found that preventing protected status based upon homosexuality or bisexuality did not satisfy the Equal Protection Clause.

In 2006, voters passed Amendment 43, which banned same-sex marriage in Colorado. That initiative was nullified by the U.S. Supreme Court's 2015 decision in Obergefell v. Hodges. In 2024, Colorado residents voted to establish an explicit right to abortion in Colorado's state constitution and to repeal Amendment 43's defunct marriage ban.

In 2012, voters amended the state constitution protecting the "personal use" of marijuana for adults, establishing a framework to regulate cannabis like alcohol. The first recreational marijuana shops in Colorado, and by extension the United States, opened their doors on January 1, 2014.

On October 30, 2019, Colorado became the first state to accept digital ID via its myColorado app. The state-issued digital identifications will be considered valid when Real ID enforcement begins in 2025, in line with the Real ID Act of 2005. By November 2022 The Colorado Governor's Office of Information Technology announced that the myColorado app had over 1 million users.

On December 19, 2023, the Colorado Supreme Court ruled that Donald Trump was disqualified from the 2024 United States presidential election in part due to his alleged incitement of the January 6 United States Capitol attack. On March 4, 2024, the United States Supreme Court overruled the Colorado decision.

=== Counties ===

The 64 counties of the U.S. State of Colorado

The State of Colorado is divided into 64 counties. Two of these counties, the City and County of Broomfield and the City and County of Denver, have consolidated city and county governments. Counties are important units of government in Colorado since there are no civil townships or other minor civil divisions.

The most populous county in Colorado is El Paso County, the home of the City of Colorado Springs. The second most populous county is the City and County of Denver, the state capital. Five of the 64 counties now have more than 500,000 residents, while 12 have fewer than 5,000 residents. The ten most populous Colorado counties are all located in the Front Range Urban Corridor. Mesa County is the most populous county on the Colorado Western Slope. The least populous Colorado county is Hinsdale County with 753 residents. (Note: United States Census Bureau estimates of county population as of July 1, 2025)

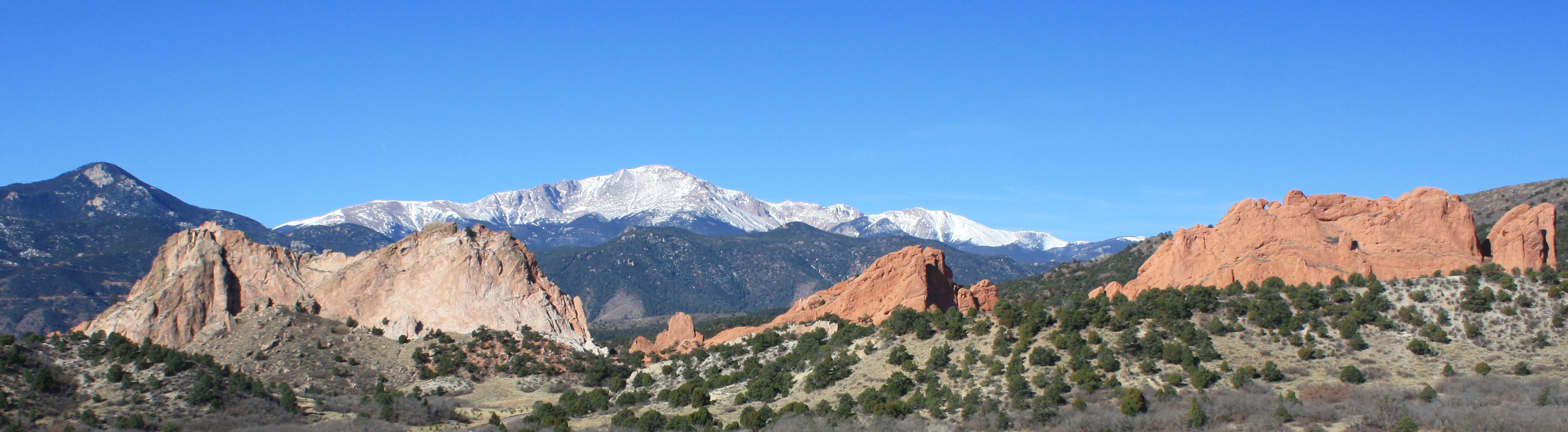
Pikes Peak and Garden of the Gods in El Paso County, Colorado

The 16 most populous Colorado counties 2025
2025 rank	County	County seat	Most populous city	2025 population
1	El Paso County	Colorado Springs	Colorado Springs	757,040
2	City and County of Denver (Note: As a consolidated city and county, the City and County of Denver is its own county seat.)			740,613
3	Arapahoe County	Littleton (Note: Littleton, Colorado also extends into Jefferson and Douglas counties.)	Aurora (Note: Aurora, Colorado also extends into Adams and Douglas counties.)	673,820
4	Jefferson County	Golden	Lakewood	580,451
5	Adams County	Brighton (Note: Brighton, Colorado also extends into Weld County.)	Thornton (Note: Thornton, Colorado also extends into Weld County.)	554,668
6	Douglas County	Castle Rock	Highlands Ranch (Note: Highlands Ranch, Colorado is a census-designated place.)	399,396
7	Weld County	Greeley	Greeley	378,426
8	Larimer County	Fort Collins	Fort Collins	377,292
9	Boulder County	Boulder	Boulder	328,560
10	Pueblo County	Pueblo	Pueblo	169,277
11	Mesa County	Grand Junction	Grand Junction	162,845
12	City and County of Broomfield (Note: As a consolidated city and county, the City and County of Broomfield is its own county seat.)			79,174
13	Garfield County	Glenwood Springs	Rifle	63,474
14	La Plata County	Durango	Durango	56,898
15	Eagle County	Eagle	Edwards (Note: Edwards, Colorado is a census-designated place.)	54,291
16	Fremont County	Cañon City	Cañon City	50,039

=== Municipalities ===
Colorado has 272 active incorporated municipalities, comprising 197 towns, 73 cities, and two consolidated city and county governments. At the 2020 United States census, 4,299,942 of the 5,773,714 Colorado residents (74.47%) lived in one of these municipalities. Another 714,417 residents (12.37%) lived in one of the 210 census-designated places, while the remaining 759,355 residents (13.15%) lived in the many rural and mountainous areas of the state.

Colorado's 272 municipalities operate under one of five types of municipal governing authority. Colorado currently has two consolidated city and county governments, 62 home rule cities, 41 home rule towns, 11 statutory cities, 155 statutory towns, and one territorial charter municipality.

The most populous municipality is the City and County of Denver. Colorado has 12 municipalities with more than 100,000 residents, and 17 with fewer than 100 residents. The 17 most populous Colorado municipalities are all located in the weather-protected Front Range Urban Corridor. The City of Grand Junction is the most populous municipality on the Colorado Western Slope. The Town of Carbonate has had no year-round population since the 1890 census due to its severe winter weather and difficult access. (Note: United States Census Bureau estimates of municipal population as of July 1, 2024)

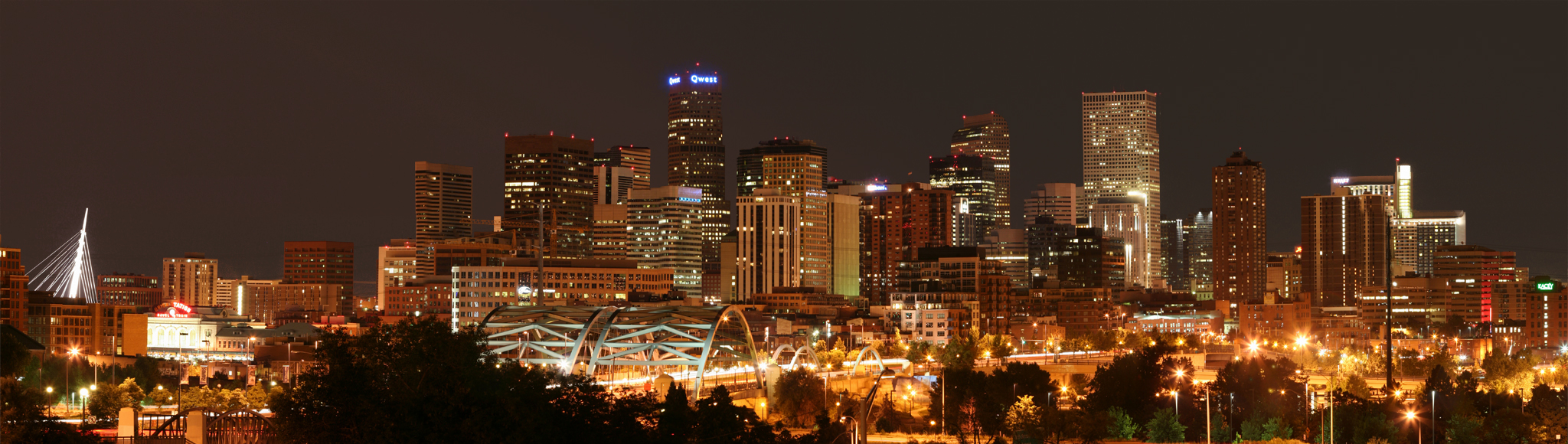
The evening skyline of downtown Denver

The 25 most populous Colorado municipalities 2025
2025 rank	Municipality	County	2025 population
1	City and County of Denver		740,613
2	City of Colorado Springs	El Paso County	494,743
3	City of Aurora	Arapahoe, Adams, and Douglas counties	410,053
4	City of Fort Collins	Larimer County	171,500
5	City of Lakewood	Jefferson County	156,927
6	City of Thornton	Adams and Weld counties	147,766
7	City of Arvada	Jefferson and Adams counties	122,901
8	City of Westminster	Adams and Jefferson counties	116,182
9	City of Greeley	Weld County	115,073
10	City of Pueblo	Pueblo County	110,404
11	City of Centennial	Arapahoe County	108,658
12	City of Boulder	Boulder County	105,689
13	City of Longmont	Boulder and Weld counties	100,109
14	Town of Castle Rock	Douglas County	83,815
15	City of Loveland	Larimer County	81,387
16	City and County of Broomfield		79,174
17	City of Commerce City	Adams County	72,345
18	City of Grand Junction	Mesa County	71,827
19	Town of Parker	Douglas County	65,985
20	City of Littleton	Arapahoe, Jefferson, and Douglas counties	46,246
21	City of Brighton	Adams and Weld counties	45,395
22	Town of Windsor	Weld and Larimer counties	43,840
23	Town of Erie	Weld and Boulder counties	40,904
24	City of Northglenn	Adams and Weld counties	38,893
25	City of Englewood	Arapahoe County	35,305

=== Unincorporated communities ===
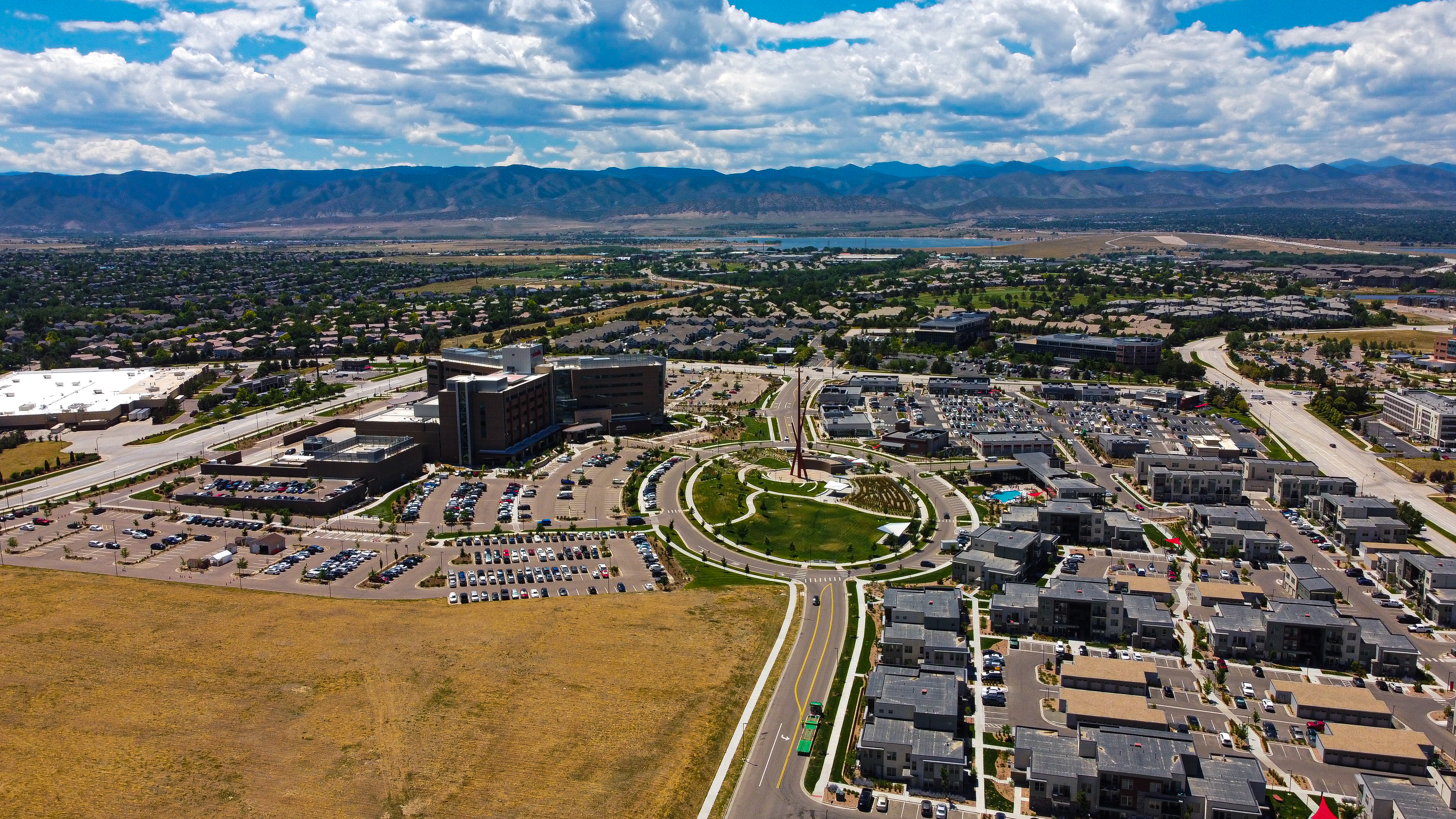
Highlands Ranch, Colorado.

In addition to its 272 municipalities, Colorado has 210 unincorporated census-designated places (CDPs) and many other small communities. The most populous unincorporated community in Colorado is Highlands Ranch south of Denver. The seven most populous CDPs are located in the Front Range Urban Corridor. The Clifton CDP is the most populous CDP on the Colorado Western Slope.

The ten most populous census-designated places in Colorado 2020
2020 rank	Census-designated place	County	2020 census
1	Highlands Ranch CDP	Douglas County	103,444
2	Security-Widefield CDP	El Paso County	38,639
3	Dakota Ridge CDP	Jefferson County	33,892
4	Ken Caryl CDP	Jefferson County	33,811
5	Pueblo West CDP	Pueblo County	33,086
6	Columbine CDP	Jefferson and Arapahoe counties	25,229
7	Four Square Mile CDP	Arapahoe County	22,872
8	Clifton CDP	Mesa County	20,413
9	Cimarron Hills CDP	El Paso County	19,311
10	Sherrelwood CDP	Adams County	19,228

=== Special districts ===
Colorado has more than 4,000 special districts, most with property tax authority. These districts may provide health services, ambulance, schools, law enforcement, fire protection, water, sewage, drainage, irrigation, transportation, recreation, infrastructure, cultural facilities, business support, redevelopment, or other services.

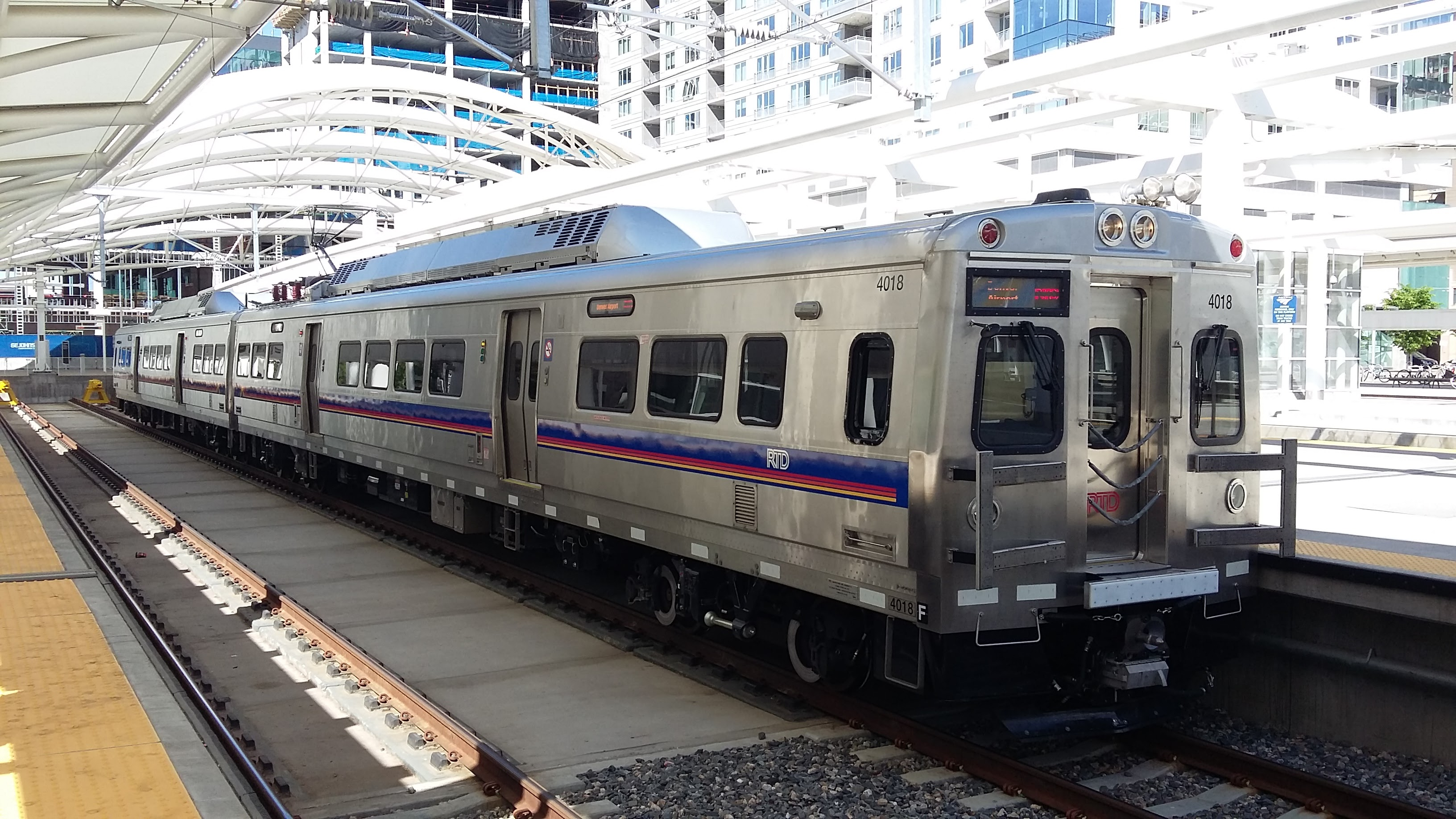
A Regional Transportation District A Line train at Denver Union Station.

Some of these districts have the authority to levy sales tax as well as property tax and use fees.

Some of the more notable Colorado districts are:

- The Regional Transportation District (RTD), which affects the counties of Denver, Boulder, Jefferson, and portions of Adams, Arapahoe, Broomfield, and Douglas Counties
- The Scientific and Cultural Facilities District (SCFD) that provides funding for cultural programing in Adams, Arapahoe, Boulder, Broomfield, Denver, Douglas, and Jefferson Counties
- The Football Stadium District (FD or FTBL), approved by the voters to pay for and help build the Denver Broncos' stadium Empower Field at Mile High.
- Local Improvement Districts (LID) within designated areas of Jefferson and Broomfield counties.
- The Metropolitan Major League Baseball Stadium District, approved by voters to pay for and help build the Colorado Rockies' stadium Coors Field.
- Regional Transportation Authority (RTA) taxes at varying rates in Basalt, Carbondale, Glenwood Springs, and Gunnison County.

=== Statistical areas ===
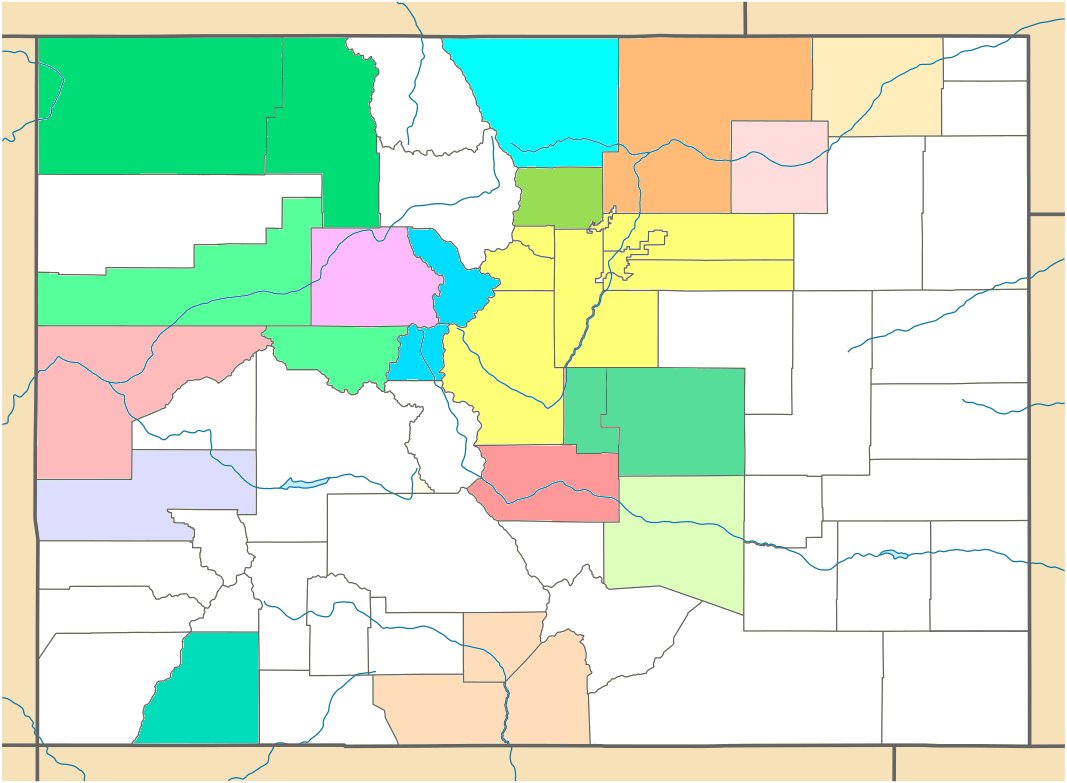

The 17 core-based statistical areas in the U.S. State of Colorado.

Most recently on July 21, 2023, the Office of Management and Budget defined 21 statistical areas for Colorado comprising four combined statistical areas, seven metropolitan statistical areas, and ten micropolitan statistical areas.

The most populous of the seven metropolitan statistical areas in Colorado is the 10-county Denver–Aurora–Centennial, CO Metropolitan Statistical Area with a population of 2,963,821 at the 2020 United States census, an increase of +15.29% since the 2010 census.

The more extensive 12-county Denver–Aurora–Greeley, CO Combined Statistical Area had a population of 3,623,560 at the 2020 census, an increase of +17.23% since the 2010 census.

The most populous extended metropolitan region in Rocky Mountain Region is the 18-county Front Range Urban Corridor along the northeast face of the Southern Rocky Mountains. This region with Denver at its center had a population of 5,055,344 at the 2020 census, an increase of +16.65% since the 2010 census.

== Demographics ==
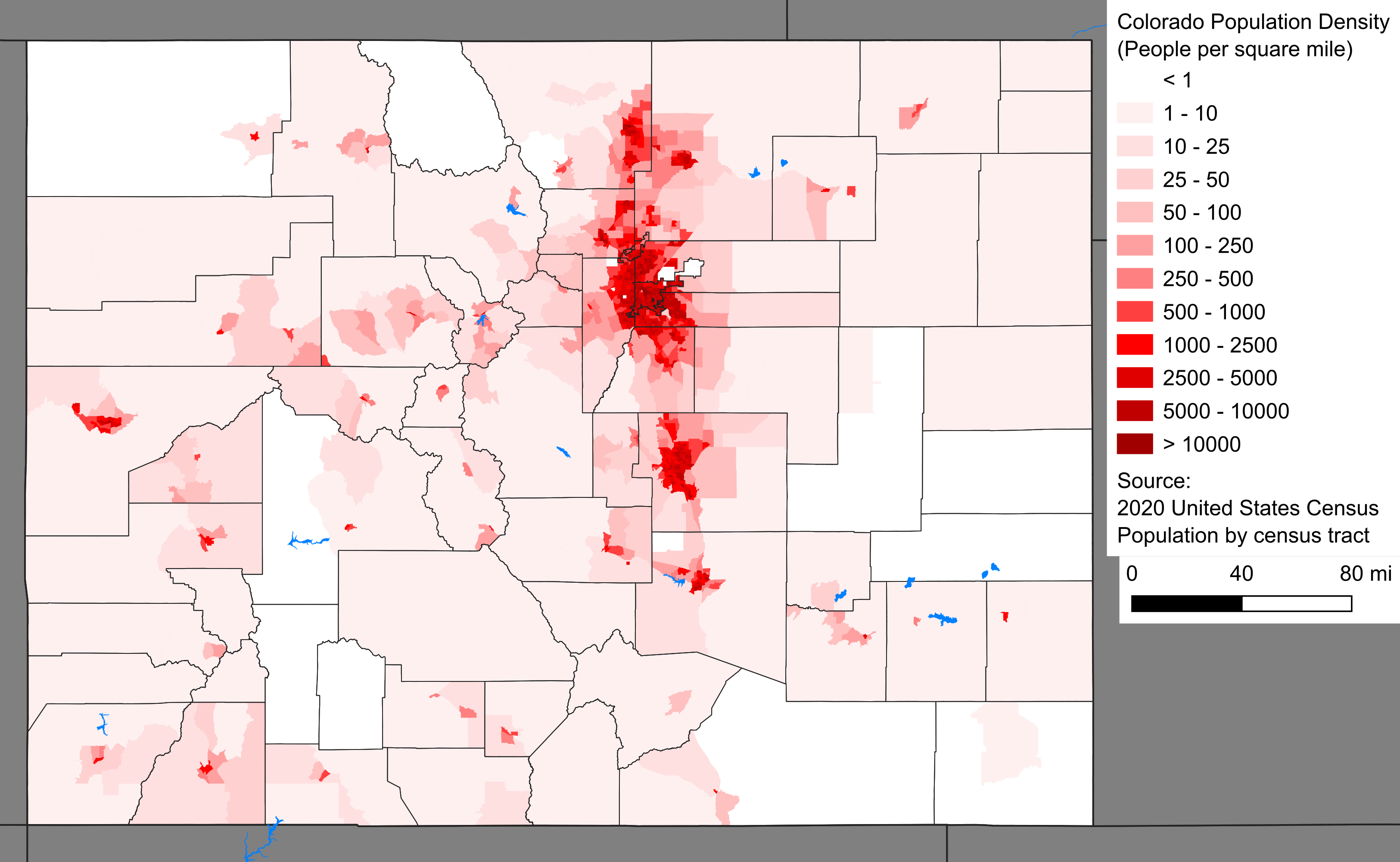
Colorado population density map

The United States Census Bureau estimated the population of Colorado on July 1, 2024, at 5,957,493, a 3.2% increase since the 2020 United States census.

Historical population
Census	Pop.	Note	%±
1860	34,277		—
1870	39,864		16.3%
1880	194,327		387.5%
1890	413,249		112.7%
1900	539,700		30.6%
1910	799,024		48.0%
1920	939,629		17.6%
1930	1,035,791		10.2%
1940	1,123,296		8.4%
1950	1,325,089		18.0%
1960	1,753,947		32.4%
1970	2,207,259		25.8%
1980	2,889,964		30.9%
1990	3,294,394		14.0%
2000	4,301,262		30.6%
2010	5,029,196		16.9%
2020	5,773,714		14.8%
2025 (est.)	6,012,561		4.1%
U.S. Decennial Census

Ethnic composition as of the 2020 census
Race and ethnicity	Non-Hispanic	Total
White	65.1%	69.4%
Hispanic or Latino (Note: Persons of Hispanic or Latino origin are not distinguished between total and partial ancestry.)	—	21.9%
Black	3.8%	4.9%
Asian	3.4%	4.7%
Native American	0.6%	2.1%
Pacific Islander	0.2%	0.4%
Other	0.5%	1.5%

Colorado historical racial demographics
Racial composition	1970	1990	2000	2010	2020
White (includes White Hispanics)	95.7%	88.2%	82.8%	81.3%	70.7%
Black	3.0%	4.0%	3.8%	4.0%	4.1%
Asian	0.5%	1.8%	2.2%	2.8%	3.5%
Native	0.4%	0.8%	1.0%	1.1%	1.3%
Native Hawaiian and other Pacific Islander	–	–	0.1%	0.1%	0.2%
Other race	0.4%	5.1%	7.2%	7.2%	8.0%
Two or more races	–	–	2.8%	3.4%	12.3%

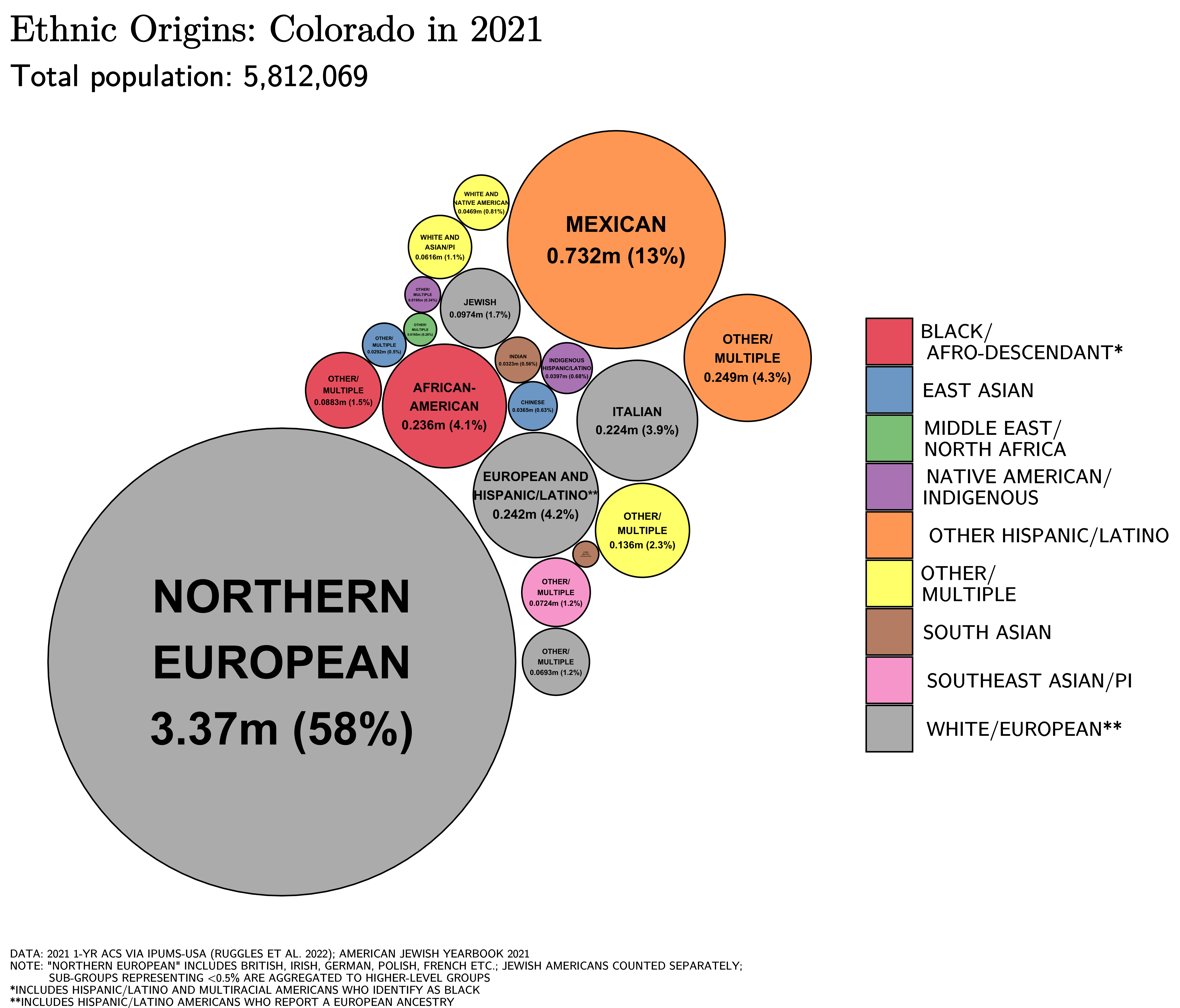
Ethnic origins in Colorado Largest alone or in any combination ethnic origin by county in Colorado, per the 2020 census

Map of counties in Colorado by racial plurality, per the 2020 U.S. census Legend: | Non-Hispanic White 40–50% 50–60% 60–70% 70–80% 80–90% | Hispanic or Latino 40–50% 50–60% |

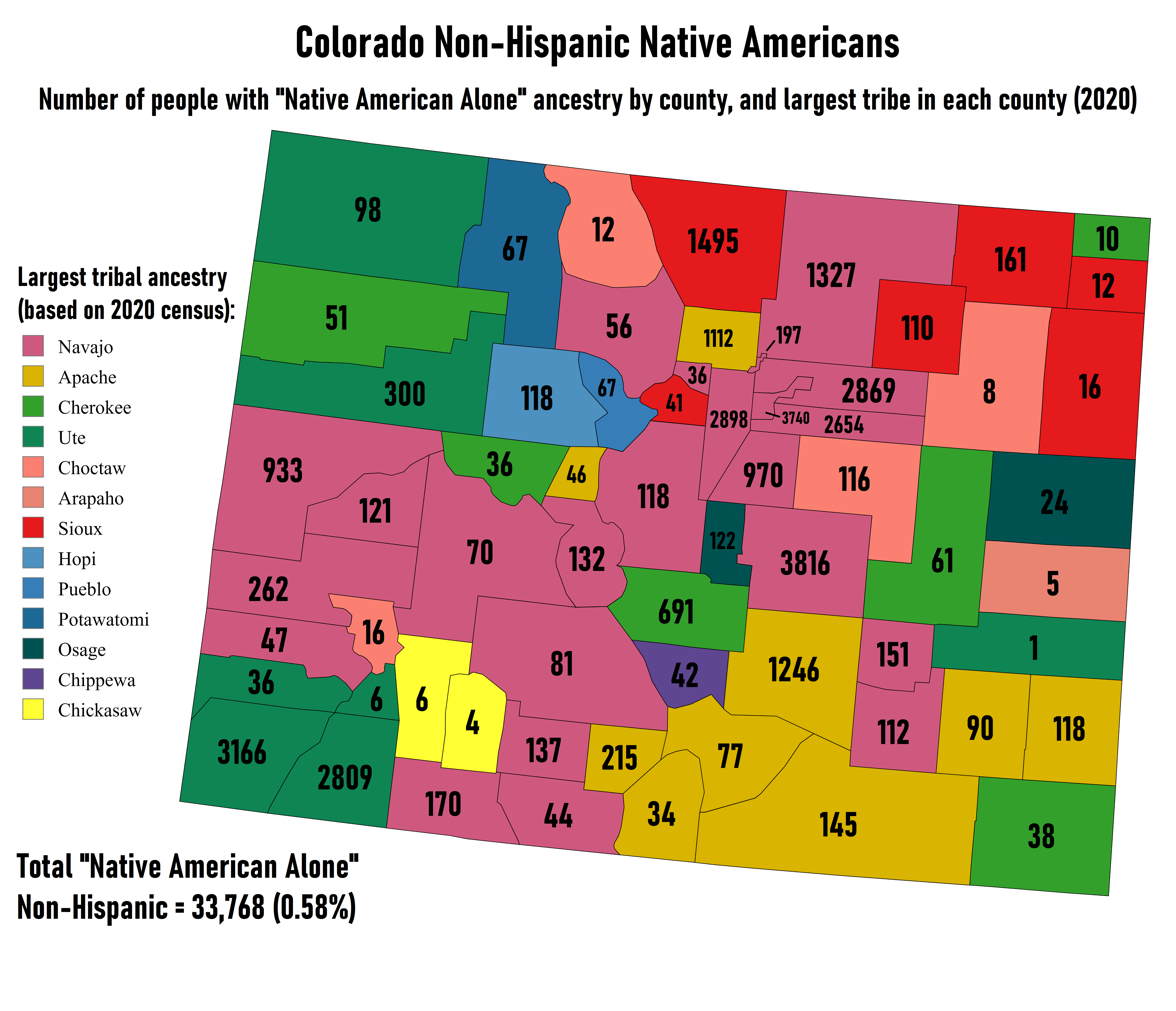
Largest Non-Hispanic Native American ancestry by county and numbers of people reporting "Native American Alone"

Coloradan Hispanics and Latinos (of any race and heritage) made up 20.7% of the population. According to the 2000 census, the largest ancestry groups in Colorado are German (22%), Mexican (18%), Irish (12%), and English (12%). Persons reporting German ancestry are especially numerous in the Front Range, the Rockies (west-central counties), and Eastern parts/High Plains.

Colorado has a high proportion of Hispanic, mostly Mexican-American, citizens in Metropolitan Denver, Colorado Springs, as well as the smaller cities of Greeley and Pueblo, and elsewhere. Southern, Southwestern, and Southeastern Colorado have a large number of Hispanos, the descendants of the early settlers of colonial Spanish origin. In 1940, the U.S. Census Bureau reported Colorado's population as 8.2% Hispanic and 90.3% non-Hispanic White. The Hispanic population of Colorado has continued to grow quickly over the past decades. By 2019, Hispanics made up 22% of Colorado's population, and Non-Hispanic Whites made up 70%. Spoken English in Colorado has many Spanish idioms.

Colorado also has some large African-American communities located in Denver, in the neighborhoods of Montbello, Five Points, Whittier, and many other East Denver areas. In the 2020 Census, 234,828 Colorado residents were identified as African American (of the total 5,773,714). Arapahoe, at 10.8% African American, was the only one of the state's 64 counties where African Americans make up more than 10% of the population. African Americans in the seven counties of Arapahoe (70,787), Denver (64,038), El Paso (43,822), Adams (17,463), Jefferson (7,356), Douglas (5,160), and Weld (4,539) make up more than 90% of all African Americans in the state.

The population of Native Americans in the state is small. Native Americans are concentrated in metropolitan Denver and the southwestern corner of Colorado, where there are two Ute reservations.

The majority of Colorado's immigrants are from Mexico, India, China, Vietnam, Korea, Germany and Canada.

There were a total of 70,331 births in Colorado in 2006. (Birth rate of 14.6 per thousand.) In 2007, non-Hispanic Whites were involved in 59.1% of all births. Some 14.06% of those births involved a non-Hispanic White person and someone of a different race, most often with a couple including one Hispanic. A birth where at least one Hispanic person was involved counted for 43% of the births in Colorado. As of the 2010 census, Colorado has the seventh highest percentage of Hispanics (20.7%) in the U.S. behind New Mexico (46.3%), California (37.6%), Texas (37.6%), Arizona (29.6%), Nevada (26.5%), and Florida (22.5%). Per the 2000 census, the Hispanic population is estimated to be 918,899, or approximately 20% of the state's total population. Colorado has the 5th-largest population of Mexican-Americans, behind California, Texas, Arizona, and Illinois. In percentages, Colorado has the 6th-highest percentage of Mexican-Americans, behind New Mexico, California, Texas, Arizona, and Nevada.

=== Birth data ===
In 2011, 46% of Colorado's population younger than the age of one were minorities, meaning that they had at least one parent who was not non-Hispanic White.

Note: Births in table do not add up, because Hispanics are counted both by their ethnicity and by their race, giving a higher overall number.

Live births by single race/ethnicity of mother
Race	2014	2015	2016	2017	2018	2019	2020	2021	2022	2023	2024
White	40,629 (61.7%)	40,878 (61.4%)	39,617 (59.5%)	37,516 (58.3%)	36,466 (58.0%)	36,022 (57.3%)	34,924 (56.8%)	36,334 (57.7%)	35,076 (56.2%)	33,640 (54.7%)	34,331 (53.4%)
Black	3,926 (6.0%)	4,049 (6.1%)	3,004 (4.5%)	3,110 (4.8%)	3,032 (4.8%)	3,044 (4.8%)	3,146 (5.1%)	2,988 (4.7%)	2,981 (4.8%)	2,904 (4.7%)	2,929 (4.6%)
Asian	3,010 (4.6%)	2,973 (4.5%)	2,617 (3.9%)	2,611 (4.1%)	2,496 (4.0%)	2,540 (4.0%)	2,519 (4.1%)	2,490 (4.0%)	2,450 (3.9%)	2,498 (4.1%)	2,677 (4.2%)
American Indian	777 (1.2%)	803 (1.2%)	412 (0.6%)	421 (0.7%)	352 (0.6%)	365 (0.6%)	338 (0.5%)	323 (0.5%)	336 (0.5%)	310 (0.5%)	309 (0.5%)
Pacific Islander	...	...	145 (0.2%)	145 (0.2%)	155 (0.2%)	168 (0.3%)	169 (0.3%)	202 (0.3%)	203 (0.3%)	256 (0.4%)	256 (0.4%)
Hispanic (any race)	17,665 (26.8%)	18,139 (27.2%)	18,513 (27.8%)	18,125 (28.2%)	17,817 (28.3%)	18,205 (29.0%)	18,111 (29.4%)	18,362 (29.2%)	18,982 (30.4%)	19,544 (31.8%)	21,243 (33.0%)
Total	65,830 (100%)	66,581 (100%)	66,613 (100%)	64,382 (100%)	62,885 (100%)	62,869 (100%)	61,494 (100%)	62,949 (100%)	62,383 (100%)	61,494 (100%)	64,268 (100%)

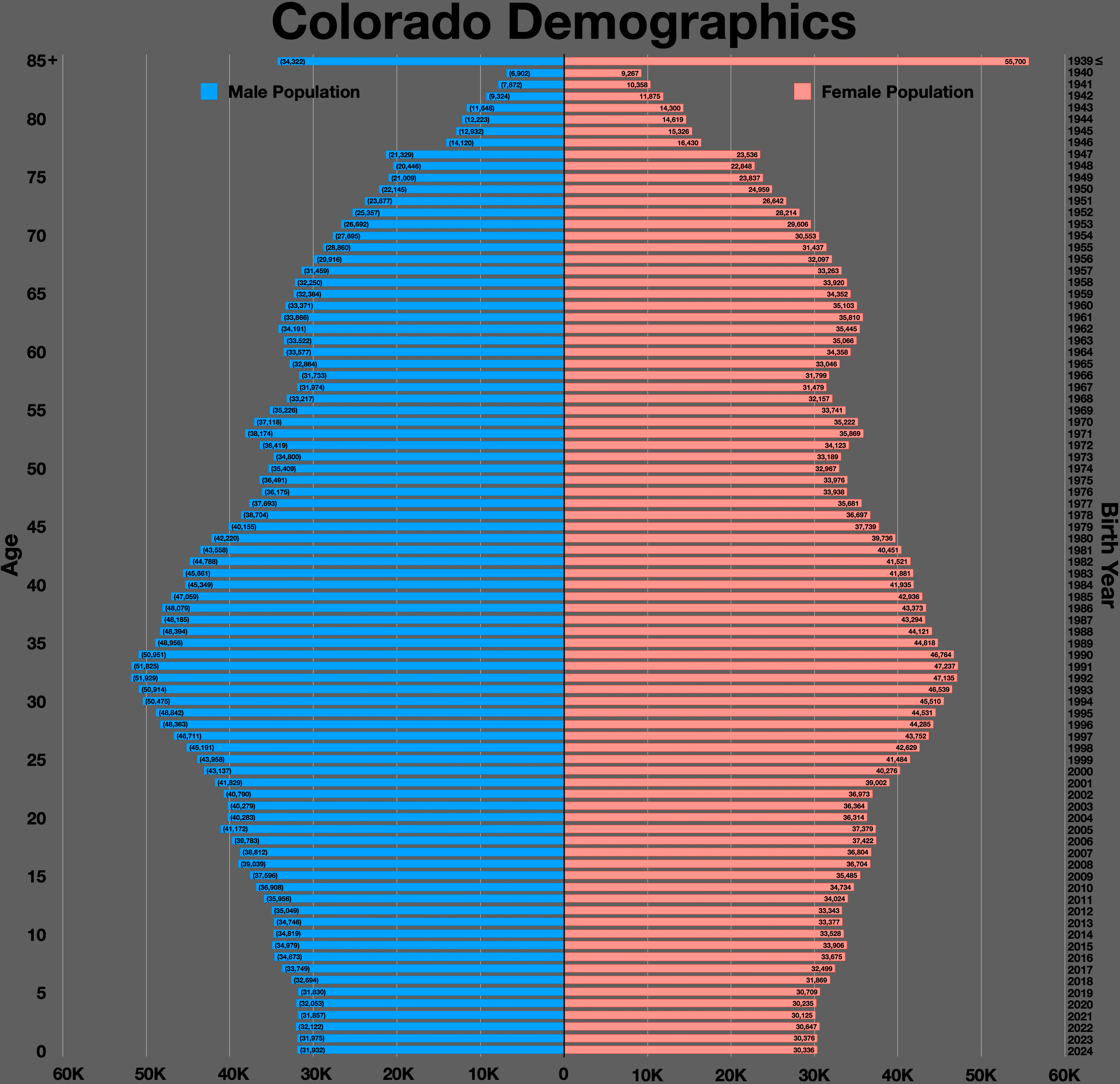
Colorado population pyramid

In 2017, Colorado recorded the second-lowest fertility rate in the United States outside of New England, after Oregon, at 1.63 children per woman. Significant contributing factors to the decline in pregnancies were the Title X Family Planning Program and an intrauterine device grant from Warren Buffett's family.

=== Language ===
English, the official language of the state, is the most commonly spoken language in Colorado. The second most commonly spoken language in the state is Spanish. The Colorado River Numic language, also known as the Ute dialect, is still spoken in Colorado.

=== Religion ===
Religious self-identification, per Public Religion Research Institute's 2022 American Values Survey
1. Protestantism 39 (38.2%)
2. Catholicism 19 (18.6%)
3. Mormonism 2 (1.96%)
4. Eastern Orthodoxy 1 (0.98%)
5. Unitarianism/Unitarian 1 (0.98%)
6. Judaism 1 (0.98%)
7. New Age 2 (1.96%)
8. East Asian Religions 2 (1.96%)
9. Hinduism 1 (0.98%)
10. No religion 34 (33.3%)

Major religious affiliations of the people of Colorado as of 2014 were 64% Christian, of whom there are 44% Protestant, 16% Roman Catholic, 3% Mormon, and 1% Eastern Orthodox. Other religious breakdowns according to the Pew Research Center were 1% Judaism, 1% Muslim, 1% Buddhist, and 4% other. Secular Coloradans made up 29% of the population. In 2020, according to the Public Religion Research Institute, Christianity was 66% of the population. Judaism was also reported to have increased in this separate study, forming 2% of the religious landscape, while the religiously unaffiliated were reported to form 28% of the population in this separate study. In 2022, the same organization reported 61% was Christian (39% Protestant, 19% Catholic, 2% Mormon, 1% Eastern Orthodox), 2% New Age, 1% Jewish, 1% Hindu, and 34% religiously unaffiliated.

According to the Association of Religion Data Archives, the largest Christian denominations by the number of adherents in 2010 were the Catholic Church with 811,630; multi-denominational Evangelical Protestants with 229,981; and the Church of Jesus Christ of Latter-day Saints with 151,433. In 2020, the Association of Religion Data Archives determined the largest Christian denominations were Catholics (873,236), non/multi/inter-denominational Protestants (406,798), and Mormons (150,509). Throughout its non-Christian population, there were 12,500 Hindus, 7,101 Hindu Yogis, and 17,369 Buddhists at the 2020 study.

Our Lady of Guadalupe Catholic Church was the first permanent Catholic parish in modern-day Colorado and was constructed by Spanish colonists from New Mexico in modern-day Conejos. Latin Church Catholics are served by three dioceses: the Archdiocese of Denver and the Dioceses of Colorado Springs and Pueblo.

The first permanent settlement by members of the Church of Jesus Christ of Latter-day Saints in Colorado arrived from Mississippi and initially camped along the Arkansas River just east of the present-day site of Pueblo.

== Health ==
Colorado is generally considered among the healthiest states by behavioral and healthcare researchers. Among the positive contributing factors is the state's well-known outdoor recreation opportunities and initiatives. However, there is a stratification of health metrics with wealthier counties such as Douglas and Pitkin performing significantly better relative to southern, less wealthy counties such as Huerfano and Las Animas.

=== Obesity ===
According to several studies, Coloradans have the lowest rates of obesity of any state in the US. As of 2018, 24% of the population was considered medically obese, and while the lowest in the nation, the percentage had increased from 17% in 2004.

=== Life expectancy ===
According to a report in the Journal of the American Medical Association, residents of Colorado had a 2014 life expectancy of 80.21 years, the longest of any U.S. state.

=== Homelessness ===
According to HUD's 2022 Annual Homeless Assessment Report, there were an estimated 10,397 homeless people in Colorado.

== Economy ==
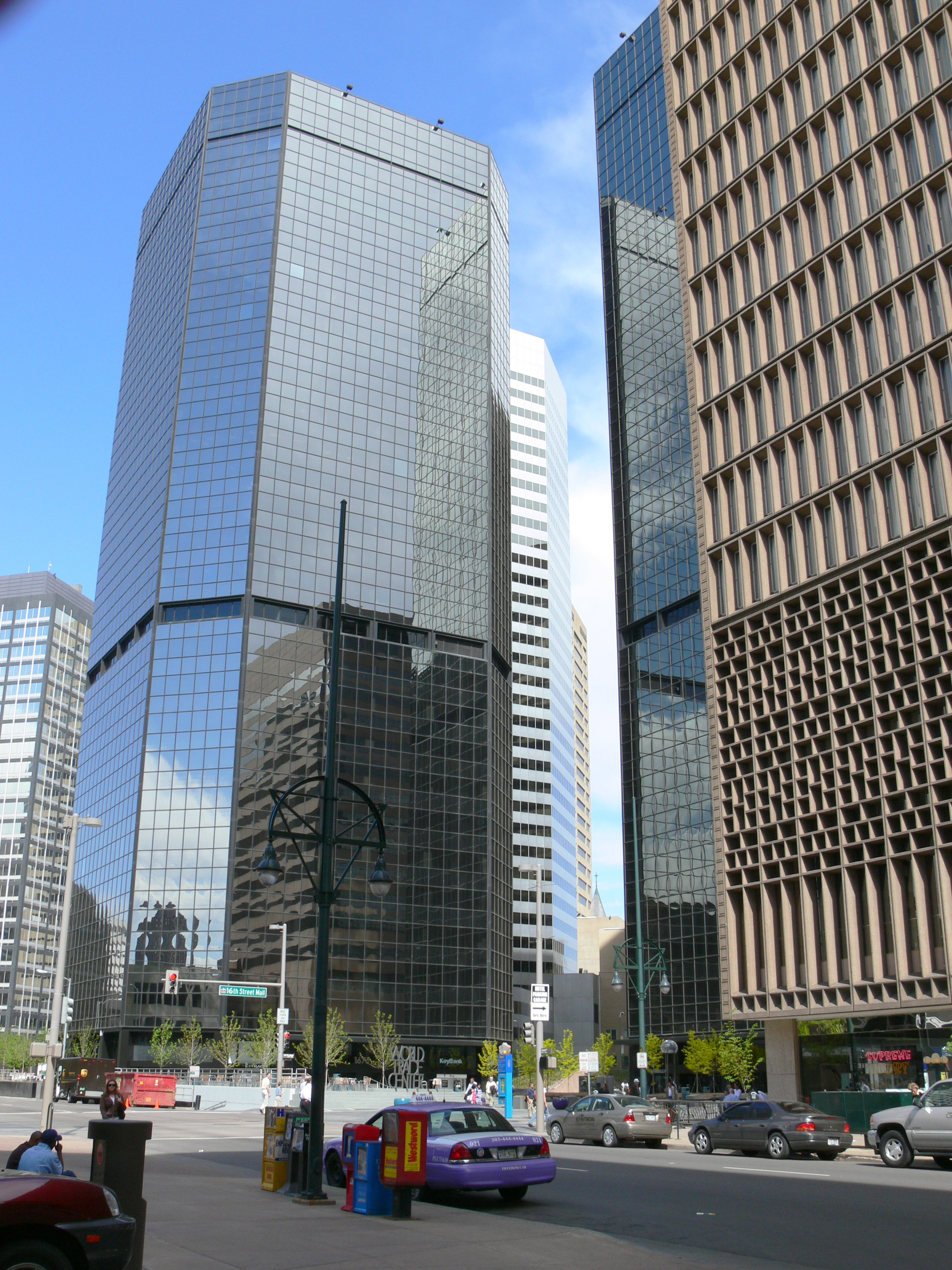
Denver Energy Center lies in the Denver financial district along 17th Street, known as the "Wall Street of the West"

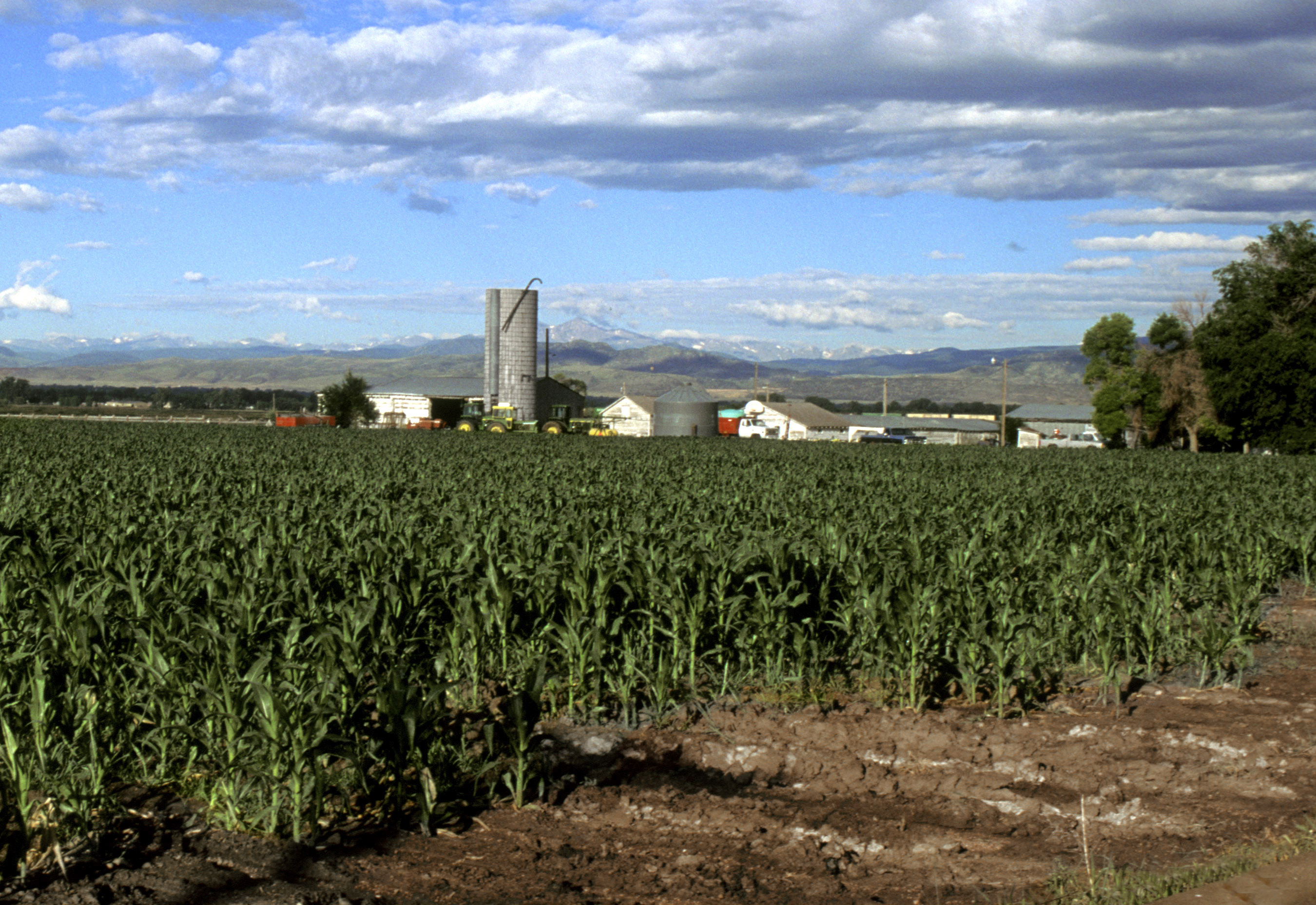
Corn growing in Larimer County

In 2019 the total employment was 2,473,192. The number of employer establishments is 174,258.

Colorado's gross domestic product in 2025 was $584.3 billion. Colorado's per capita personal income was $86,181 in 2025, ranking Colorado 10th in the nation. Median Annual Household Income in 2016 was $70,666, 8th in the nation. The state's economy broadened from its mid-19th-century roots in mining when irrigated agriculture developed, and by the late 19th century, raising livestock had become important. Early industry was based on the extraction and processing of minerals and agricultural products. Current agricultural products are cattle, wheat, dairy products, corn, and hay. In 2025, small businesses made up 99.5% of Colorado businesses, and employed 48.6% of the state's work force.

The federal government operates several federal facilities in the state, including NORAD (North American Aerospace Defense Command), United States Air Force Academy, Schriever Air Force Base located approximately 10 miles (16 kilometers) east of Peterson Air Force Base, and Fort Carson, both located in Colorado Springs within El Paso County; NOAA, the National Renewable Energy Laboratory (NREL) in Golden, and the National Institute of Standards and Technology in Boulder; U.S. Geological Survey and other government agencies at the Denver Federal Center near Lakewood; the Denver Mint, Buckley Space Force Base, the Tenth Circuit Court of Appeals, and the Byron G. Rogers Federal Building and United States Courthouse in Denver; and a federal Supermax Prison and other federal prisons near Cañon City. In addition to these and other federal agencies, Colorado has abundant National Forest land and four National Parks that contribute to federal ownership of 24,615,788 acres (99,617 km^{2}) of land in Colorado, or 37% of the total area of the state.

In the second half of the 20th century, the industrial and service sectors expanded greatly. The state's economy is diversified and is notable for its concentration on scientific research and high-technology industries. Other industries include food processing, transportation equipment, machinery, chemical products, the extraction of metals such as gold (see Gold mining in Colorado), silver, and molybdenum. Colorado now also has the largest annual production of beer in any state. Denver is an important financial center.

The state's diverse geography and majestic mountains attract millions of tourists every year, including 85.2 million in 2018. Tourism contributes greatly to Colorado's economy, with tourists generating $22.3 billion in 2018.

Several nationally known brand names have originated in Colorado factories and laboratories. From Denver came the forerunner of telecommunications giant Qwest in 1879, Samsonite luggage in 1910, Gates belts and hoses in 1911, and Russell Stover Candies in 1923. Kuner canned vegetables began in Brighton in 1864. From Golden came Coors beer in 1873, CoorsTek industrial ceramics in 1920, and Jolly Rancher candy in 1949. CF&I railroad rails, wire, nails, and pipe debuted in Pueblo in 1892. Holly Sugar was first milled from beets in Holly in 1905, and later moved its headquarters to Colorado Springs. The present-day Swift packed meat of Greeley evolved from Monfort of Colorado, Inc., established in 1930. Estes model rockets were launched in Penrose in 1958. Fort Collins has been the home of Woodward Governor Company's motor controllers (governors) since 1870, and Waterpik dental water jets and showerheads since 1962. Celestial Seasonings herbal teas have been made in Boulder since 1969. Rocky Mountain Chocolate Factory made its first candy in Durango in 1981.

Colorado has a flat 4.63% income tax, regardless of income level. On November 3, 2020, voters authorized an initiative to lower that income tax rate to 4.55 percent. Unlike most states, which calculate taxes based on federal adjusted gross income, Colorado taxes are based on taxable income—income after federal exemptions and federal itemized (or standard) deductions. Colorado's state sales tax is 2.9% on retail sales. When state revenues exceed state constitutional limits, according to Colorado's Taxpayer Bill of Rights legislation, full-year Colorado residents can claim a sales tax refund on their individual state income tax return. Many counties and cities charge their own rates, in addition to the base state rate. There are also certain county and special district taxes that may apply.

Real estate and personal business property are taxable in Colorado. The state's senior property tax exemption was temporarily suspended by the Colorado Legislature in 2003. The tax break was scheduled to return for the assessment year 2006, payable in 2007.

As of May 2025, the state's unemployment rate was 4.8%.

The West Virginia teachers' strike in 2018 inspired teachers in other states, including Colorado, to take similar action.

=== Agriculture ===
Corn is grown in the Eastern Plains of Colorado. Arid conditions and drought negatively impacted yields in 2020 and 2022.

=== Natural resources ===
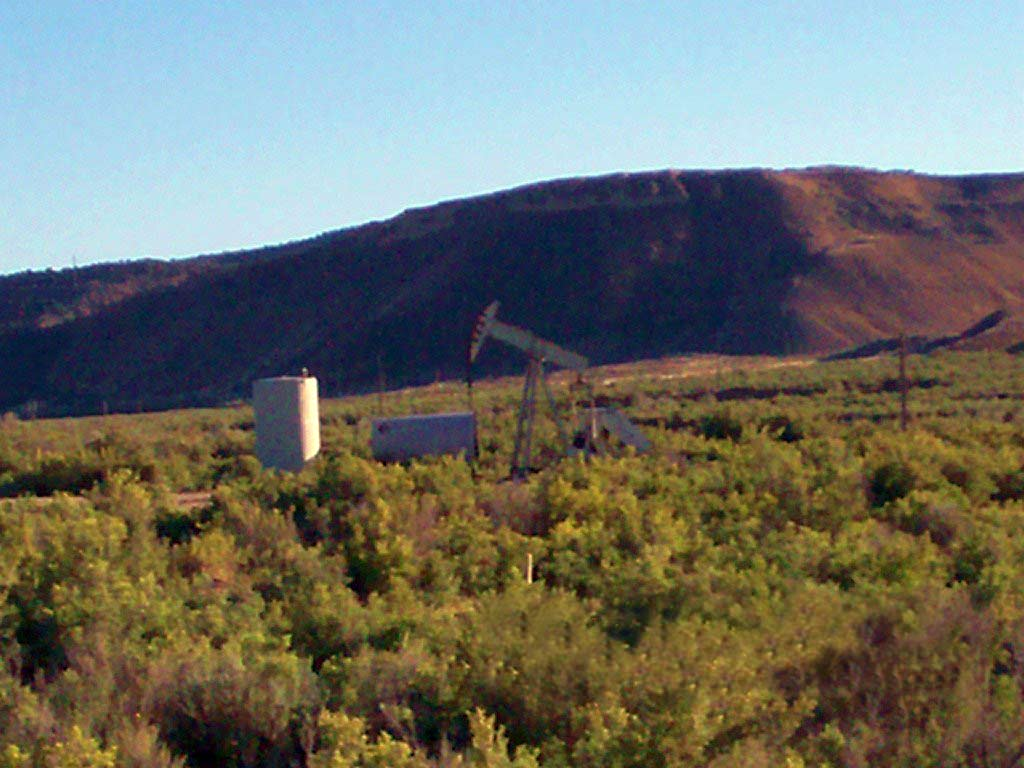
An oil well in western Colorado

Colorado has significant hydrocarbon resources. According to the Energy Information Administration, Colorado hosts seven of the largest natural gas fields in the United States, and two of the largest oil fields. Conventional and unconventional natural gas output from several Colorado basins typically accounts for more than five percent of annual U.S. natural gas production. Colorado's oil shale deposits hold an estimated 1 trillion barrels (160 km^{3}) of oil—nearly as much oil as the entire world's proven oil reserves. Substantial deposits of bituminous, subbituminous, and lignite coal are found in the state.

Uranium mining in Colorado goes back to 1872, when pitchblende ore was taken from gold mines near Central City, Colorado. Not counting byproduct uranium from phosphate, Colorado is considered to have the third-largest uranium reserves of any U.S. state, behind Wyoming and New Mexico. When Colorado and Utah dominated radium mining from 1910 to 1922, uranium and vanadium were the byproducts (giving towns like present-day Superfund site Uravan their names). Uranium price increases from 2001 to 2007 prompted several companies to revive uranium mining in Colorado. During the 1940s certain communities–including Naturita and Paradox–earned the moniker of "yellowcake towns" from their relationship with uranium mining. Price drops and financing problems in late 2008 forced these companies to cancel or scale back the uranium-mining project. As of 2016, there were no major uranium mining operations in the state, though plans existed to restart production.

=== Electricity generation ===
Colorado's high Rocky Mountain ridges and eastern plains offer wind power potential, and geologic activity in the mountain areas provides the potential for geothermal power development. Much of the state is sunny and could produce solar power. Major rivers flowing from the Rocky Mountains offer hydroelectric power resources.

== Culture ==
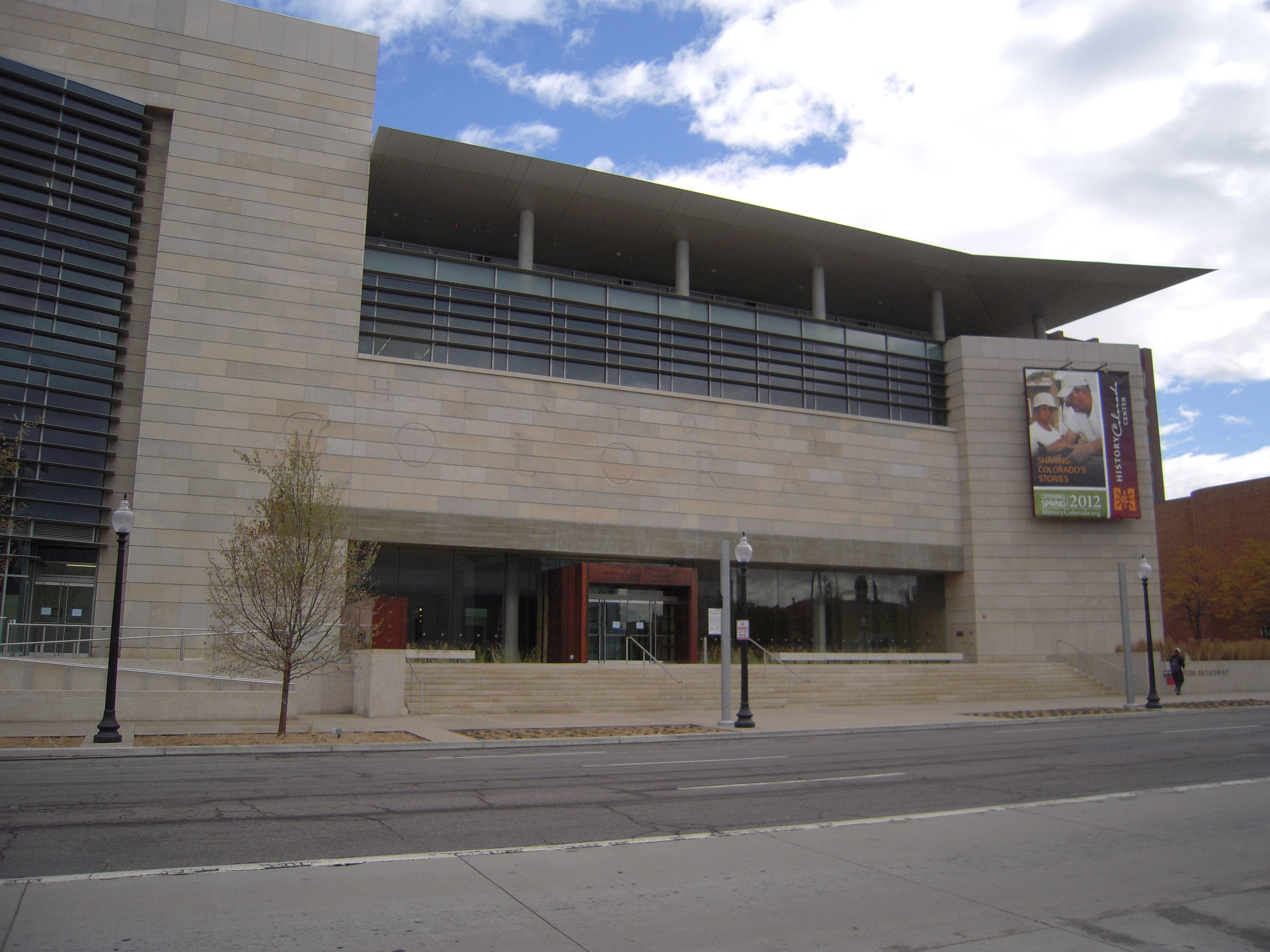
History Colorado Center in Denver

=== Arts and film ===
- List of museums in Colorado
- List of theaters in Colorado
- Music of Colorado

Several film productions have been shot on location in Colorado, especially prominent Westerns like True Grit, The Searchers, City Slickers, Butch Cassidy and the Sundance Kid, and My Life With the Walter Boys. Several historic military forts, railways with trains still operating, and mining ghost towns have been used and transformed for historical accuracy in well-known films. There are also several scenic highways and mountain passes that helped to feature the open road in films such as Vanishing Point, Bingo and Starman. Some Colorado landmarks have been featured in films, such as The Stanley Hotel in Dumb and Dumber and The Shining and the Sculptured House in Sleeper. In 2015, Furious 7 was to film driving sequences on Pikes Peak Highway in Colorado. The TV adult-animated series South Park takes place in central Colorado in the titular town. Additionally, the TV series Good Luck Charlie was set, but not filmed, in Denver, Colorado. The Colorado Office of Film and Television has noted that more than 400 films have been shot in Colorado.

There are also several established film festivals in Colorado, including Aspen Filmfest and Aspen Shortsfest, Boulder International Film Festival, Castle Rock Film Festival, Denver Film Festival, Festivus Film Festival, Mile High Horror Film Festival, Moondance International Film Festival, Mountainfilm in Telluride, Rocky Mountain Women's Film Festival, and Telluride Film Festival. On March 27, 2025, it was announced Sundance Film Festival would move to Boulder starting in 2027 after reaching a deal for a ten-year duration.

Many notable writers have lived or spent extended periods in Colorado. 5280, a Denver magazine, wrote in 2015 that Kent Haruf is "widely considered [to be] Colorado's finest novelist"; Haruf set his novels in the fictional high plains Colorado town of Holt. Beat Generation writers Jack Kerouac and Neal Cassady lived in and around Denver for several years each. Irish playwright Oscar Wilde visited Colorado on his tour of the United States in 1882, writing in his 1906 Impressions of America that Leadville was "the richest city in the world. It has also got the reputation of being the roughest, and every man carries a revolver."

=== Cuisine ===
Colorado is known for its Southwest and Rocky Mountain cuisine, with Mexican restaurants found throughout the state.

Boulder was named America's Foodiest Town 2010 by Bon Appétit. Boulder, and Colorado in general, is home to several national food and beverage companies, top-tier restaurants and farmers' markets. Boulder also has more Master Sommeliers per capita than any other city, including San Francisco and New York. Denver is known for steak, but now has a diverse culinary scene with many restaurants.

Polidori Sausage is a brand of pork products available in supermarkets, which originated in Colorado, in the early 20th century.

The Food & Wine Classic is held annually each June in Aspen. Aspen also has a reputation as the culinary capital of the Rocky Mountain region.

=== Wine and beer ===
Colorado wines include varietals that have attracted favorable notice from outside the state. With wines made from traditional Vitis vinifera grapes along with wines made from cherries, peaches, plums, and honey, Colorado wines have won top national and international awards for their quality. Colorado's grape growing regions contain the highest elevation vineyards in the United States, with most viticulture in the state practiced between 4,000 and 7,000 feet (1,219 and 2,134 m) above sea level. The mountain climate ensures warm summer days and cool nights. Colorado is home to two designated American Viticultural Areas of the Grand Valley AVA and the West Elks AVA, where most of the vineyards in the state are located. However, an increasing number of wineries are located along the Front Range. In 2018, Wine Enthusiast Magazine named Colorado's Grand Valley AVA in Mesa County, Colorado, as one of the Top Ten wine travel destinations in the world.

Colorado is home to many nationally praised microbreweries, including New Belgium Brewing Company, Odell Brewing Company, and Great Divide Brewing Company. The area of northern Colorado near and between the cities of Denver, Boulder, and Fort Collins is known as the "Napa Valley of Beer" due to its high density of craft breweries.

=== Marijuana and hemp ===
Colorado is open to cannabis (marijuana) tourism. With the adoption of the 64th state amendment in 2012, Colorado became the first state in the union to legalize marijuana for medicinal (2000), industrial (referring to hemp, 2012), and recreational (2012) use. Colorado's marijuana industry sold $1.31 billion worth of marijuana in 2016 and $1.26 billion in the first three-quarters of 2017. The state generated tax, fee, and license revenue of $194 million in 2016 on legal marijuana sales. Colorado regulates hemp as any part of the plant with less than 0.3% THC.

On April 4, 2014, Senate Bill 14–184 addressing oversight of Colorado's industrial hemp program was first introduced, ultimately being signed into law by Governor John Hickenlooper on May 31, 2014.

==== Medicinal use ====
On November 7, 2000, 54% of Colorado voters passed Amendment 20, which amends the Colorado State constitution to allow the medical use of marijuana. A patient's medical use of marijuana, within the following limits, is lawful:

- (I) No more than 2 ounces (57 g) of a usable form of marijuana; and
- (II) No more than twelve marijuana plants, with six or fewer being mature, flowering plants that are producing a usable form of marijuana.

Currently, Colorado has listed "eight medical conditions for which patients can use marijuana—cancer, glaucoma, HIV/AIDS, muscle spasms, seizures, severe pain, severe nausea and cachexia, or dramatic weight loss and muscle atrophy". While governor, John Hickenlooper allocated about half of the state's $13 million "Medical Marijuana Program Cash Fund" to medical research in the 2014 budget. By 2018, the Medical Marijuana Program Cash Fund was the "largest pool of pot money in the state" and was used to fund programs including research into pediatric applications for controlling autism symptoms.

==== Recreational use ====
On November 6, 2012, voters amended the state constitution to protect "personal use" of marijuana for adults, establishing a framework to regulate marijuana in a manner similar to alcohol. The first recreational marijuana shops in Colorado, and by extension the United States, opened their doors on January 1, 2014.

== Transportation ==
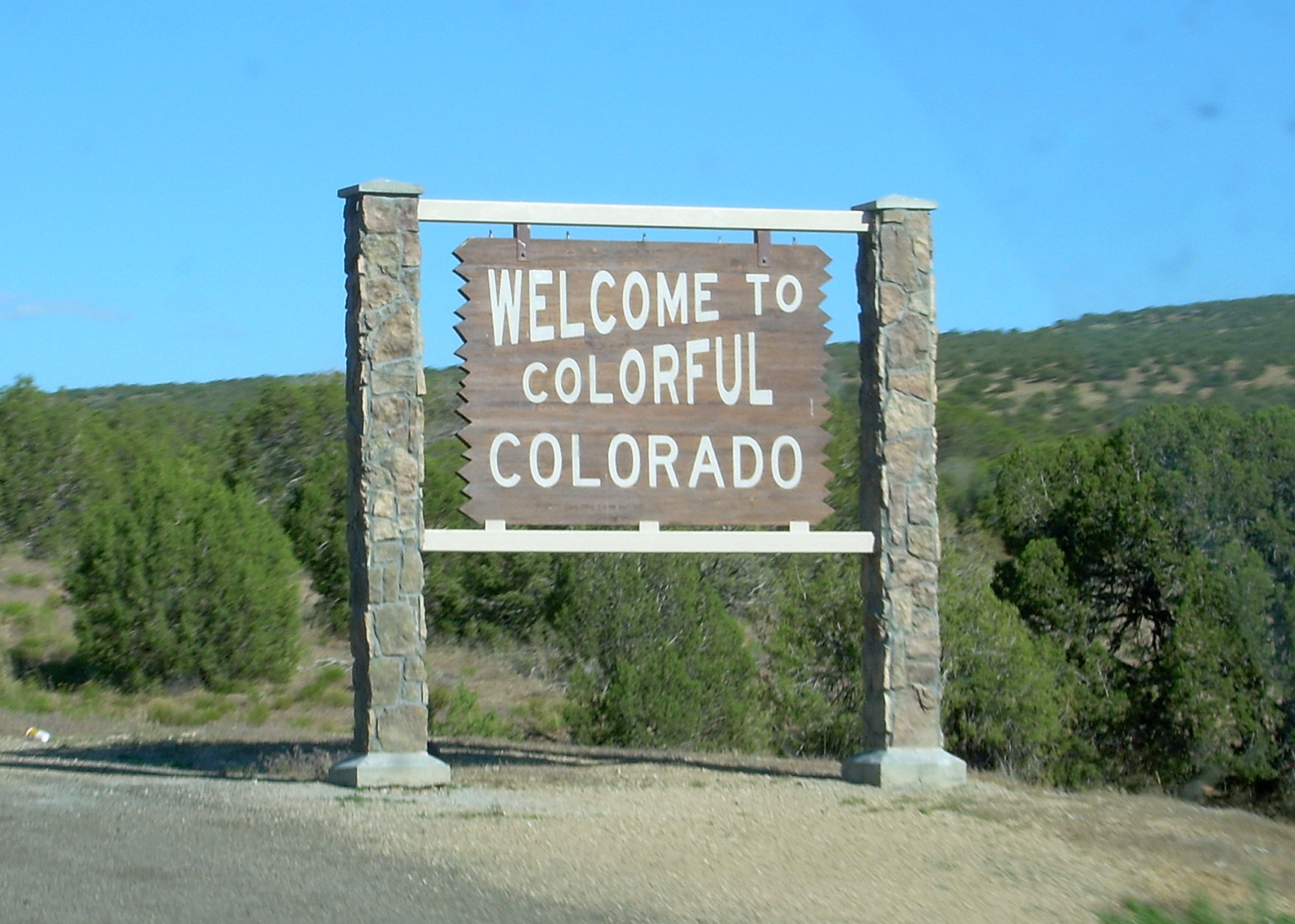
A Colorado state welcome sign

Colorado's primary mode of transportation (in terms of passengers) is its highway system. Interstate 25 (I-25) is the primary north–south highway in the state, connecting Pueblo, Colorado Springs, Denver, and Fort Collins, and extending north to Wyoming and south to New Mexico. I-70 is the primary east–west corridor. It connects Grand Junction and the mountain communities with Denver and enters Utah and Kansas. The state is home to a network of US and Colorado highways that provide access to all principal areas of the state. Many smaller communities are connected to this network only via county roads.

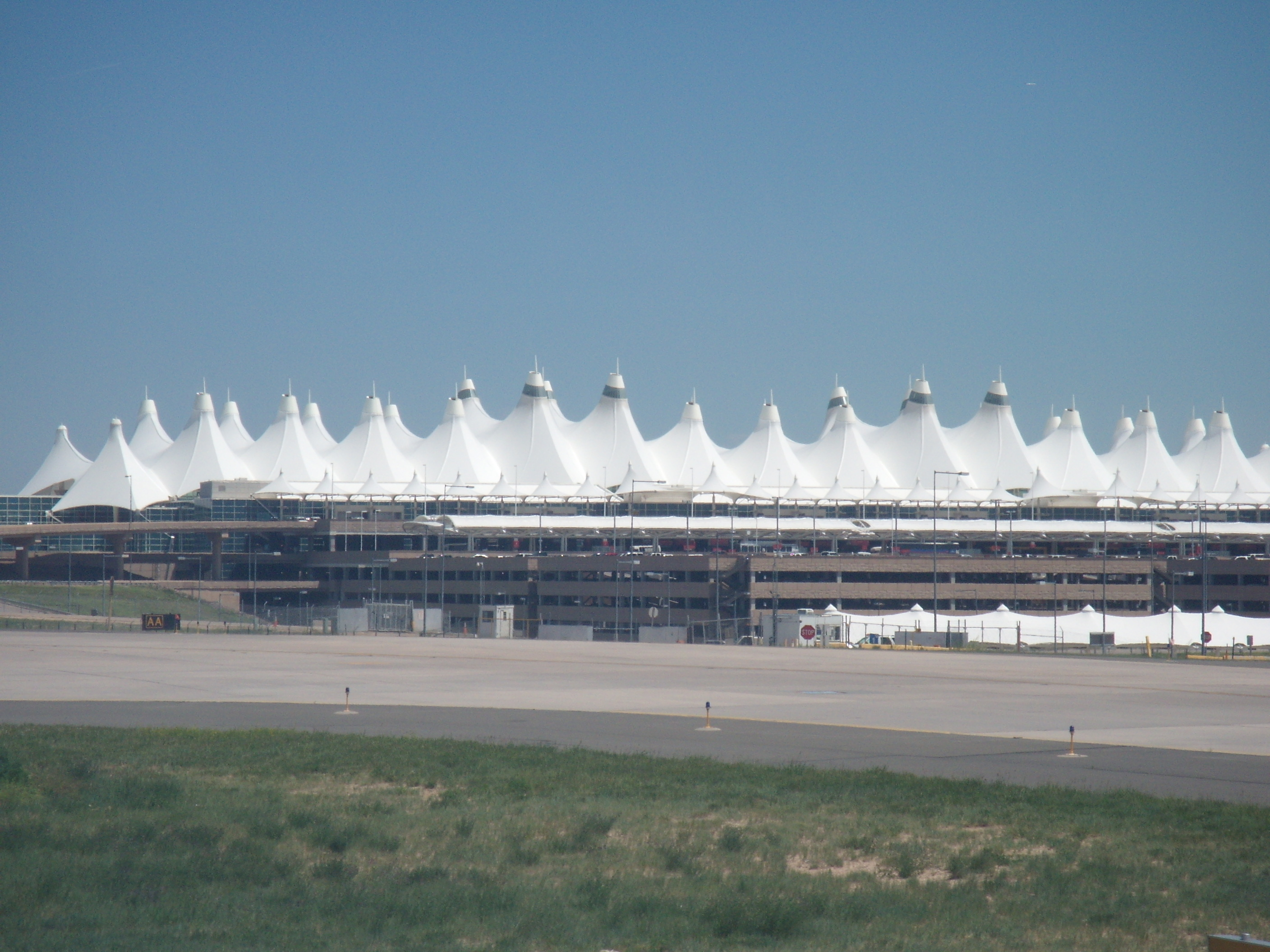
The main terminal of Denver International Airport evokes the peaks of the Front Range.

Denver International Airport (DIA) is the third-busiest domestic U.S. and international airport in the world by passenger traffic. DIA handles by far the largest volume of commercial air traffic in Colorado and is the busiest U.S. hub airport between Chicago and the Pacific coast, making Denver the most important airport for connecting passenger traffic in the western United States.

Public transportation bus services are offered both intra-city and inter-city—including the Denver metro area's RTD services. The Regional Transportation District (RTD) operates the popular RTD Bus & Rail transit system in the Denver Metropolitan Area. As of January 2013 the RTD rail system had 170 light-rail vehicles, serving 47 miles (76 km) of track. In addition to local public transit, intercity bus service is provided by Burlington Trailways, Bustang and Greyhound Lines.

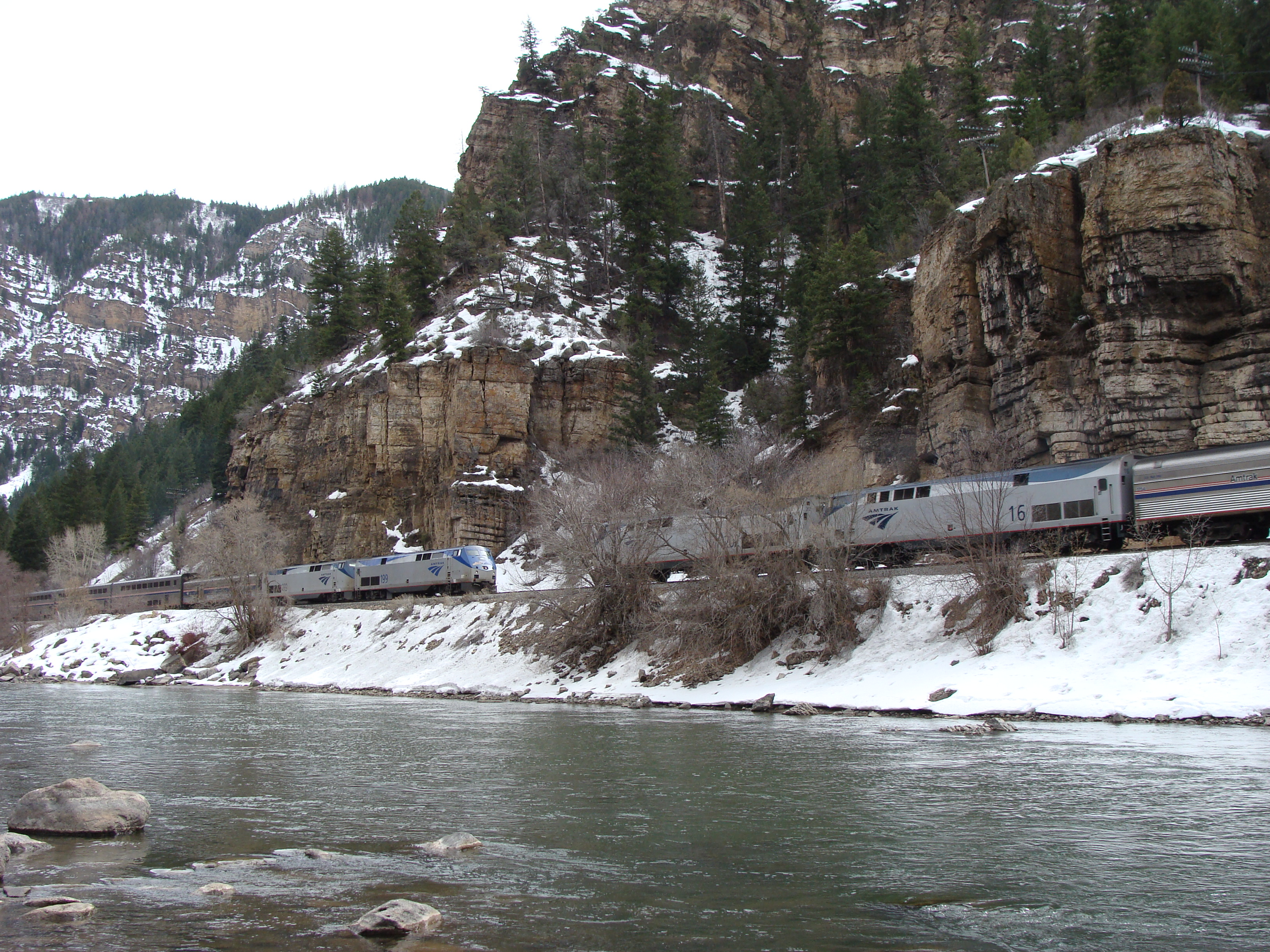
The westbound and eastbound California Zephyrs meet in the Glenwood Canyon.

Amtrak operates two passenger rail lines in Colorado, the California Zephyr and Southwest Chief. Colorado's contribution to world railroad history was forged principally by the Denver and Rio Grande Western Railroad which began in 1870 and wrote the book on mountain railroading. In 1988 the "Rio Grande" was acquired, but was merged into, the Southern Pacific Railroad by their joint owner Philip Anschutz. On September 11, 1996, Anschutz sold the combined company to the Union Pacific Railroad, creating the largest railroad network in the United States. The Anschutz sale was partly in response to the earlier merger of Burlington Northern and Santa Fe which formed the large Burlington Northern and Santa Fe Railway (BNSF), Union Pacific's principal competitor in western U.S. railroading. Both Union Pacific and BNSF have extensive freight operations in Colorado.

Colorado's freight railroad network consists of 2,688 miles of Class I trackage. It is integral to the U.S. economy, being a critical artery for the movement of energy, agriculture, mining, and industrial commodities as well as general freight and manufactured products between the East and Midwest and the Pacific coast states.

In August 2014, Colorado began to issue driver licenses to aliens not lawfully in the United States who lived in Colorado. In September 2014, KCNC reported that 524 non-citizens were issued Colorado driver licenses that are normally issued to U.S. citizens living in Colorado.

== Education ==
The first institution of higher education in the Colorado Territory was the Colorado Seminary, opened on November 16, 1864, by the Methodist Episcopal Church. The seminary closed in 1867 but reopened in 1880 as the University of Denver. In 1870, the Bishop George Maxwell Randall of the Episcopal Church's Missionary District of Colorado and Parts Adjacent opened the first of what become the Colorado University Schools which would include the Territorial School of Mines opened in 1873 and sold to the Colorado Territory in 1874. These schools were initially run by the Episcopal Church. An 1861 territorial act called for the creation of a public university in Boulder, though it would not be until 1876 that the University of Colorado was founded. The 1876 act also renamed Territorial School of Mines as the Colorado School of Mines. An 1870 territorial act created the Agricultural College of Colorado which opened in 1879. The college was renamed the Colorado State College of Agriculture and Mechanic Arts in 1935, and became Colorado State University in 1957.

The first Catholic college in Colorado was the Jesuit Sacred Heart College, which was founded in New Mexico in 1877, moved to Morrison in 1884, and to Denver in 1887. The college was renamed Regis College in 1921 and Regis University in 1991. On April 1, 1924, armed students patrolled the campus after a burning cross was found, the climax of tensions between Regis College and the locally-powerful Ku Klux Klan.

Following a 1950 assessment by the Service Academy Board, it was determined that there was a need to supplement the U.S. Military and Naval Academies with a third school that would provide commissioned officers for the newly independent Air Force. On April 1, 1954, President Dwight Eisenhower signed a law that moved for the creation of a U.S. Air Force Academy. Later that year, Colorado Springs was selected to host the new institution. From its establishment in 1955, until the construction of appropriate facilities in Colorado Springs was completed and opened in 1958, the Air Force Academy operated out of Lowry Air Force Base in Denver. With the opening of the Colorado Springs facility, the cadets moved to the new campus, though not in the full-kit march that some urban and campus legends suggest. The first class of Space Force officers from the Air Force Academy commissioned on April 18, 2020.

== Indigenous people ==
Map of Indian reservations in Colorado.

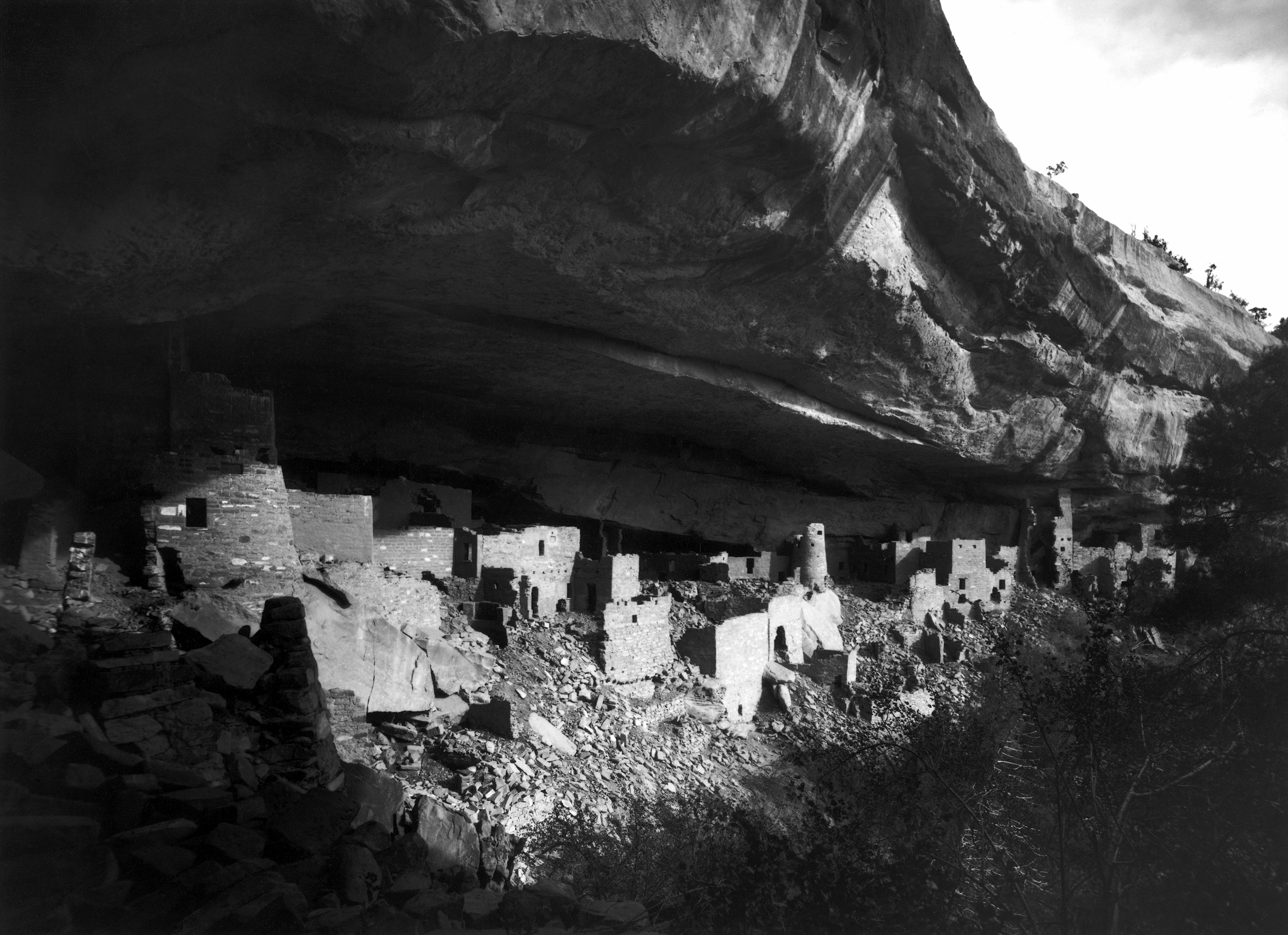
The ruins of the Cliff Palace of Mesa Verde, photographed by Gustaf Nordenskiöld in 1891

See Indigenous People of Colorado

The two Native American reservations remaining in Colorado are the Southern Ute Indian Reservation (1873; Ute dialect: Kapuuta-wa Moghwachi Núuchi-u) and Ute Mountain Ute Indian Reservation (1940; Ute dialect: Wʉgama Núuchi).

The two terminated Indian reservations in Colorado were the Cheyenne and Arapaho Indian Reservation (1851–1870) and Ute Indian Reservation (1855–1873).

== Military installations ==
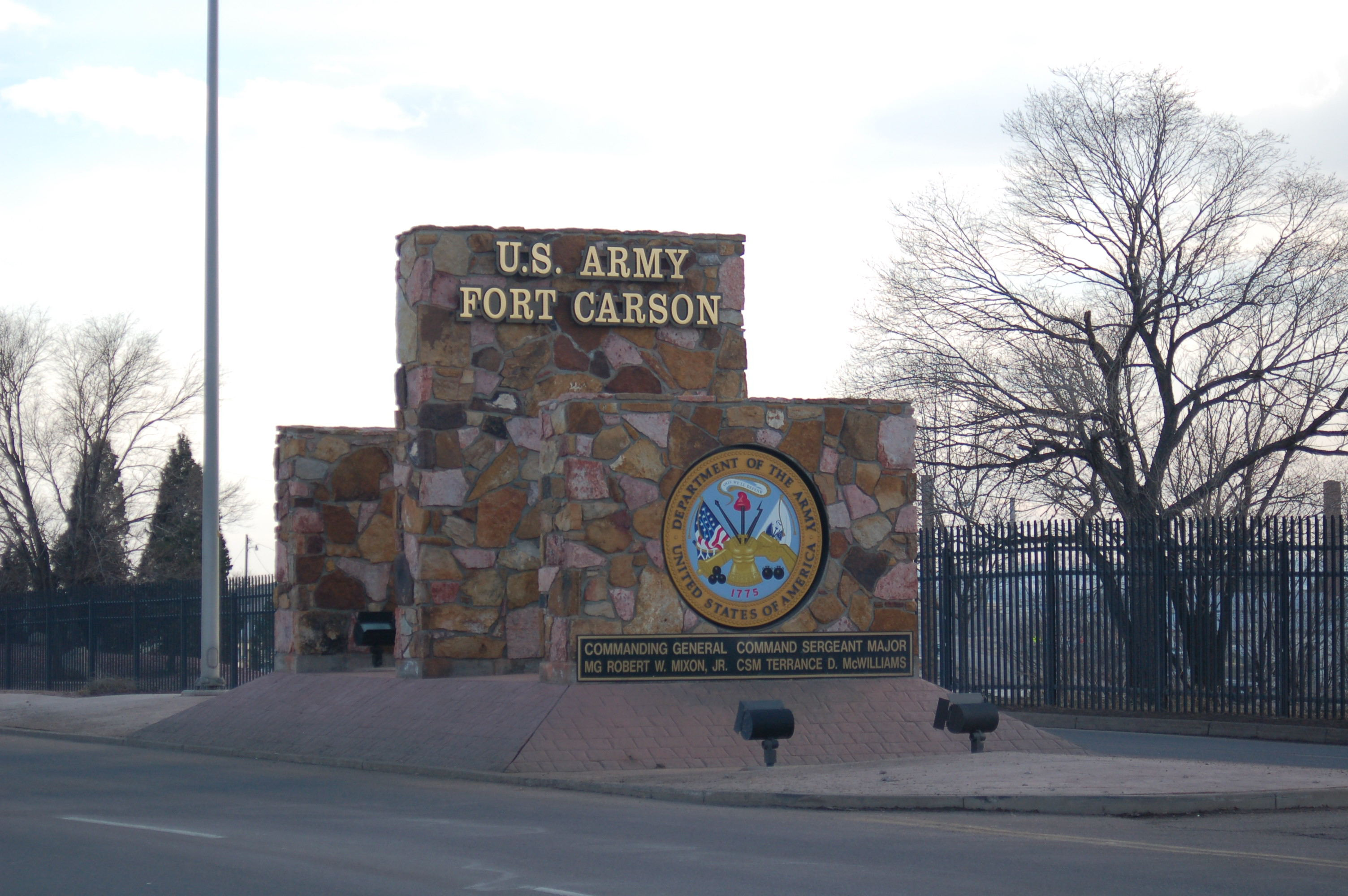
Fort Carson

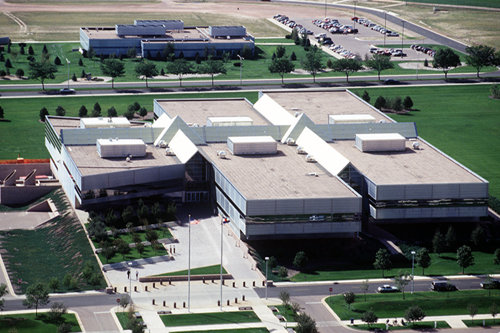
Peterson Space Force Base

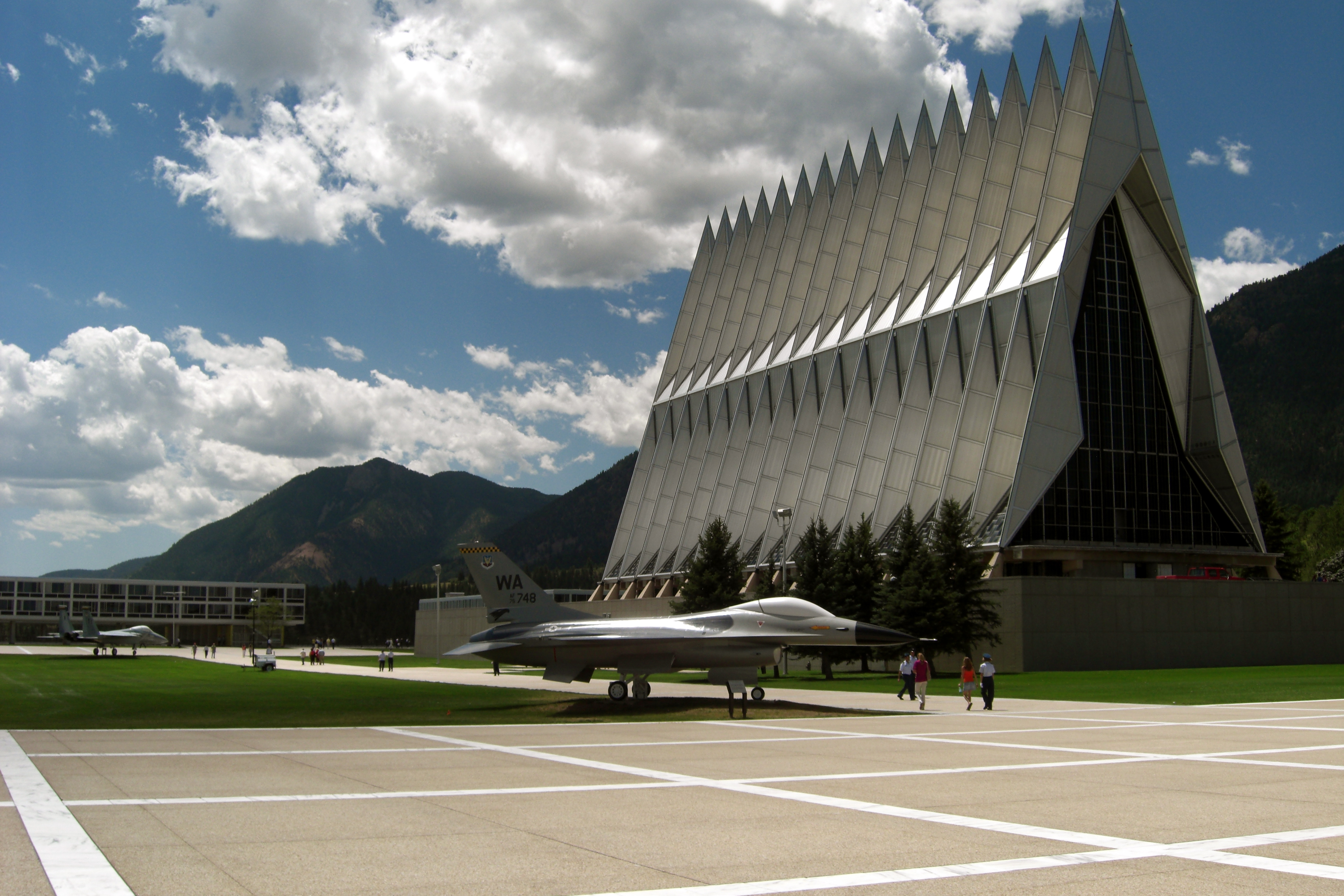
United States Air Force Academy

The major military installations in Colorado include:

- Buckley Space Force Base (1938–)
  - Air Reserve Personnel Center (1953–)
- Fort Carson (U.S. Army 1942–)
  - Piñon Canyon Maneuver Site (1983–)
- Peterson Space Force Base (1942–)
  - Cheyenne Mountain Space Force Station (1961–)
- Schriever Space Force Base (1983–)
- United States Air Force Academy (1954–)

Former military posts in Colorado include:

- Spanish Fort (Spanish Army 1819–1821)
- Fort Massachusetts (U.S. Army 1852–1858)
- Fort Garland (U.S. Army 1858–1883)
- Camp Collins (U.S. Army 1862–1870)
- Fort Lewis (U.S. Army 1878–1891)
- Fort Logan (U.S. Army 1887–1946)
- Colorado National Guard Armory (1913–1933)
- Fitzsimons Army Hospital (U.S. Army 1918–1999)
- Denver Medical Depot (U.S. Army 1925–1949)
- Lowry Air Force Base (1938–1994)
- Pueblo Army Air Base (1941–1948)
- Rocky Mountain Arsenal (U.S. Army 1942–1992)
- Pueblo Chemical Depot (U.S. Army 1942–2024)
- Camp Hale (U.S. Army 1942–1945)
- La Junta Army Air Field (1942–1946)
- Leadville Army Air Field (1943–1944)

== Protected areas ==
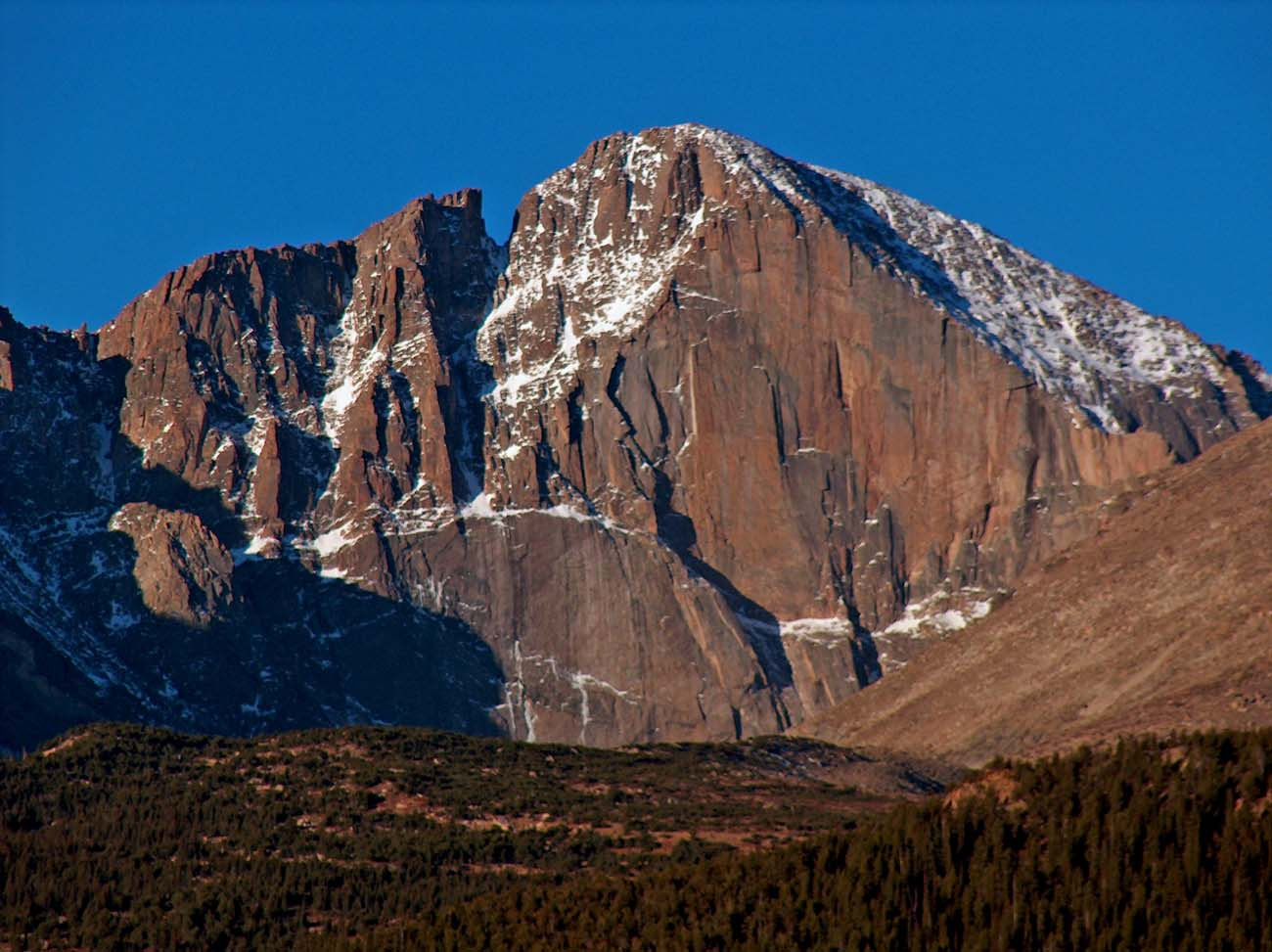
Longs Peak in Rocky Mountain National Park.

Colorado is home to:

- 4 national parks
- 9 national monuments
- 3 national historic sites
- 2 national recreation areas
- 4 national historic trails
- 1 national scenic trail
- 11 national forests
- 2 national grasslands
- 44 national wildernesses
- 3 national conservation areas
- 8 national wildlife refuges
- 3 national heritage areas
- 26 national historic landmarks
- 16 national natural landmarks
- 1 wild and scenic river
- 42 state parks
- 307 state wildlife areas
- 93 state natural areas
- 28 national recreation trails
- More than 1,500 National Register of Historic Places
- 6 regional trails, and numerous other scenic, historic, and recreational areas.

== Sports ==
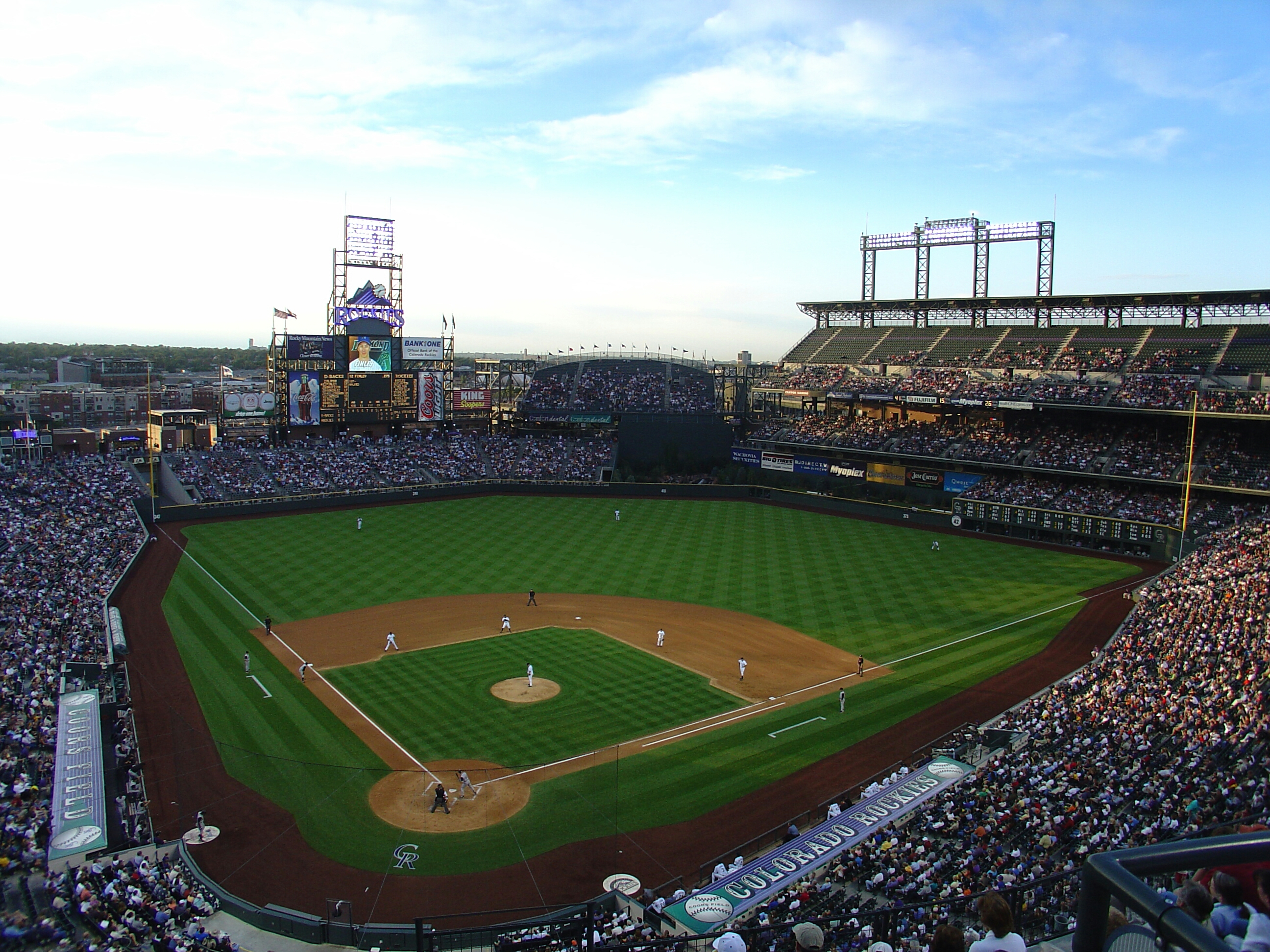
The Colorado Rockies baseball club at Coors Field

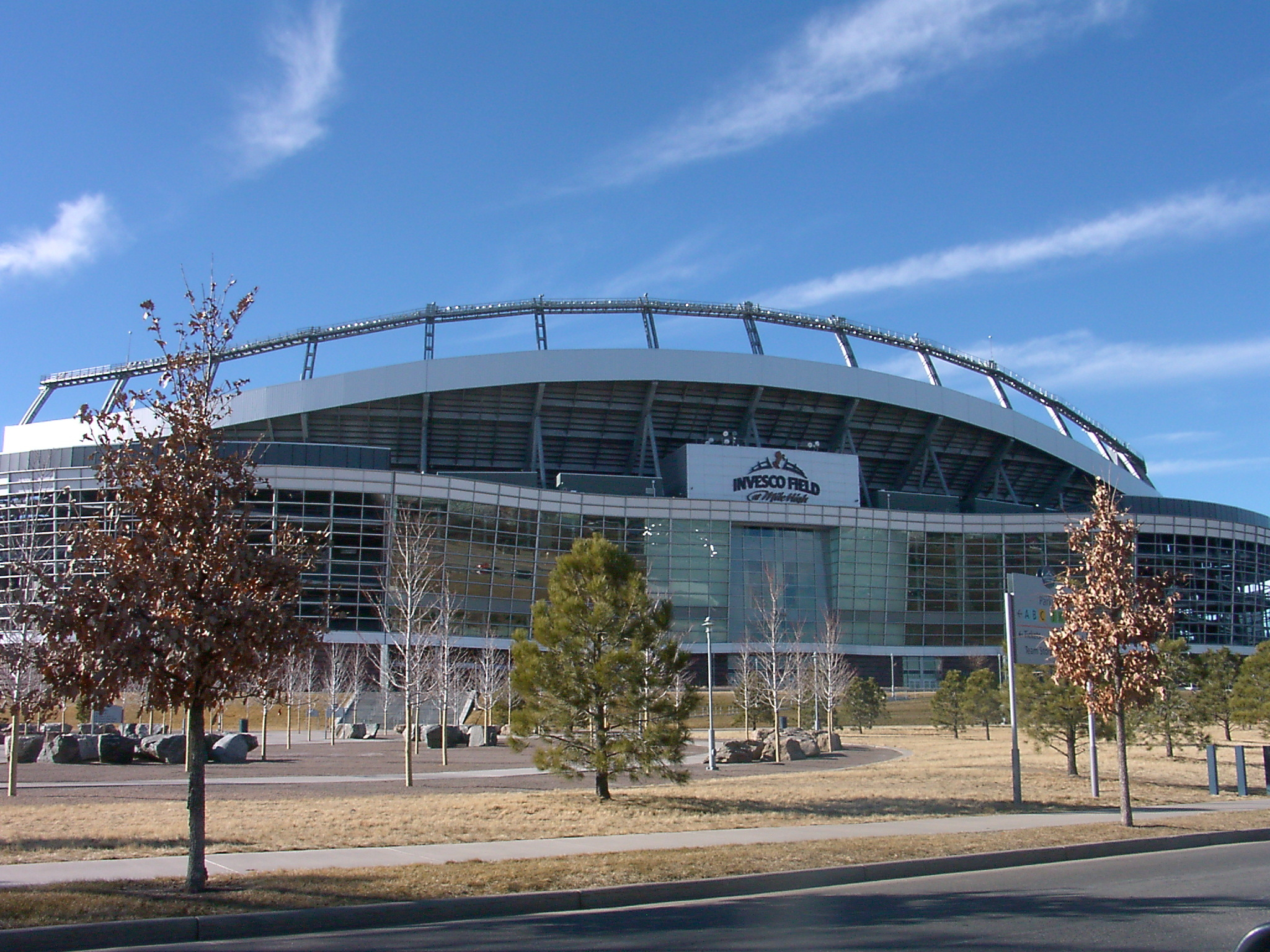
Empower Field at Mile High in Denver, home field of the Denver Broncos and the Denver Outlaws

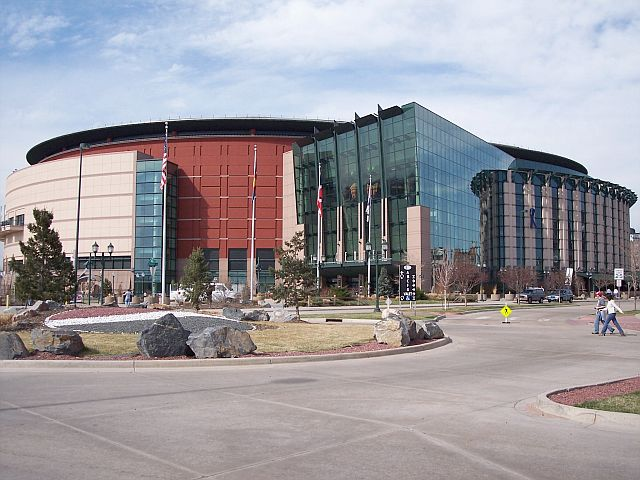
Ball Arena, home of the Denver Nuggets, the Colorado Avalanche, and the Colorado Mammoth

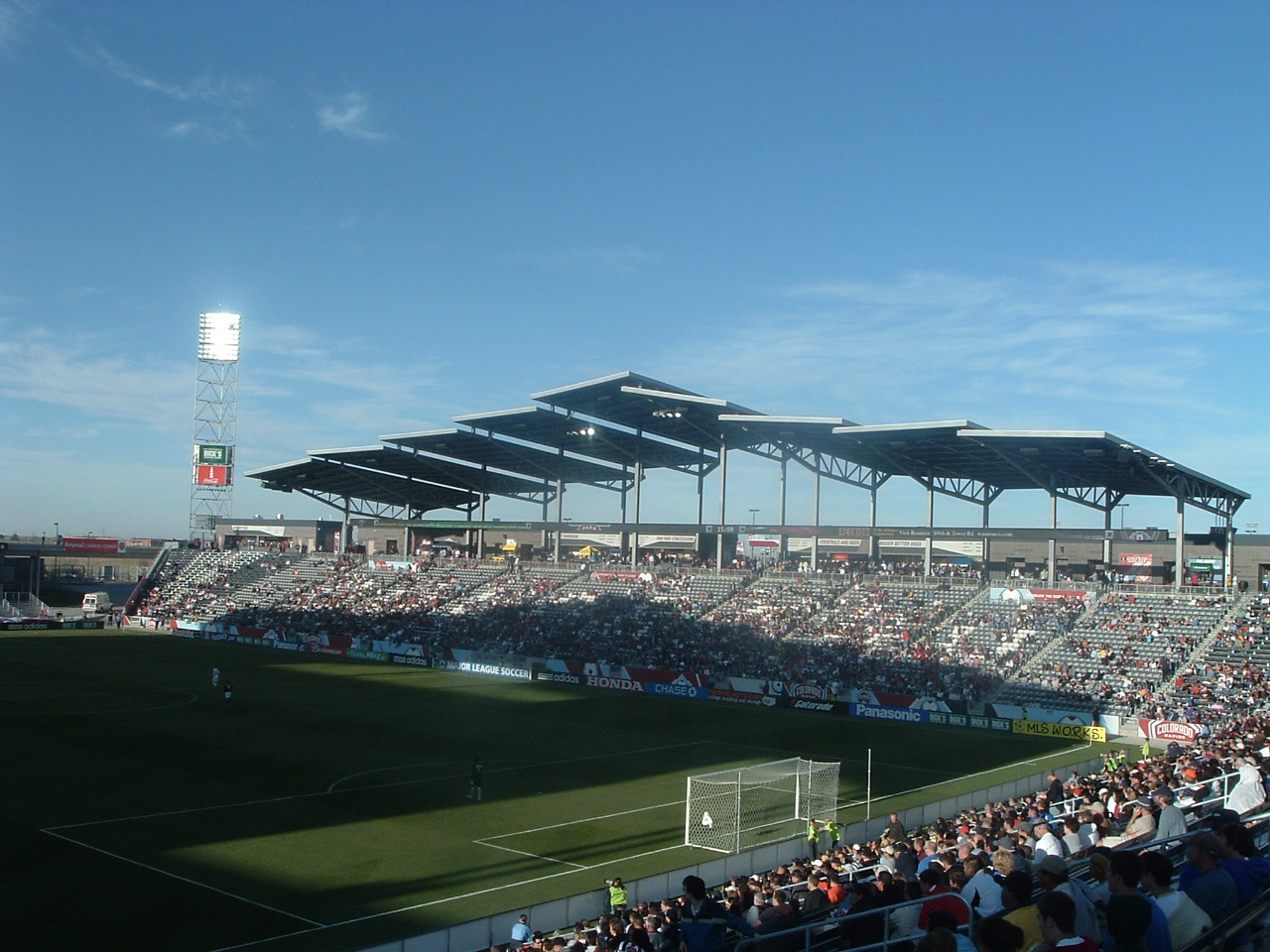
Dick's Sporting Goods Park, home of the Colorado Rapids

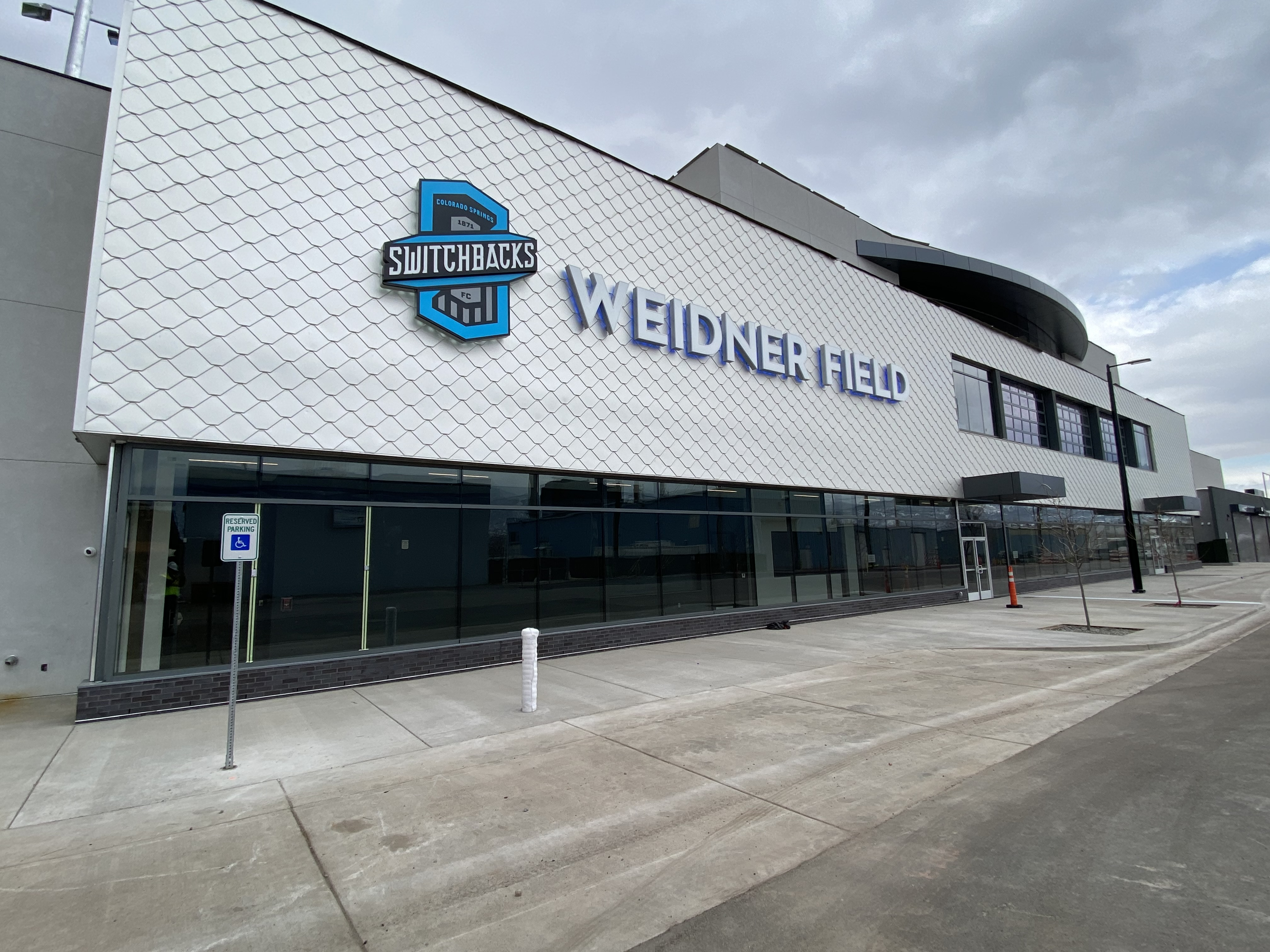
Weidner Field in Colorado Springs, home of the Colorado Springs Switchbacks FC

Colorado has five major professional sports leagues, all based in the Denver metropolitan area. Colorado is the least populous state with a franchise in each of the major professional sports leagues.

The Pikes Peak International Hill Climb is a major hill climbing motor race held on the Pikes Peak Highway.

The Cherry Hills Country Club has hosted several professional golf tournaments, including the U.S. Open, U.S. Senior Open, U.S. Women's Open, PGA Championship and BMW Championship.

=== Professional sports teams ===
Team	Home	First game	Sport	League
Colorado Avalanche	Denver	October 6, 1995	Ice hockey	National Hockey League
Colorado Eagles	Loveland	October 17, 2003	Ice hockey	American Hockey League
Colorado Mammoth	Denver	January 3, 2003	Lacrosse	National Lacrosse League
Colorado Rapids	Commerce City	April 13, 1996	Soccer	Major League Soccer
Colorado Rapids 2	Denver	March 27, 2022	Soccer	MLS Next Pro
Colorado Rockies	Denver	April 5, 1993	Baseball	Major League Baseball
Colorado Springs Switchbacks FC	Colorado Springs	March 28, 2015	Soccer	USL Championship
Denver Barbarians	Denver	Spring 1967	Rugby union	Pacific Rugby Premiership
Denver Broncos	Denver	September 9, 1960	American football	National Football League
Denver Nuggets	Denver	September 27, 1967	Basketball	National Basketball Association
Denver Summit FC	Denver	March 14, 2026	Soccer	National Women's Soccer League
Glendale Raptors	Glendale	Fall 2006	Rugby union	Major League Rugby
Grand Junction Rockies	Grand Junction	June 18, 2012	Baseball	Pioneer League
Northern Colorado Hailstorm FC	Windsor	April 6, 2022	Soccer	USL League One
Northern Colorado Owlz	Windsor	May 25, 2022	Baseball	Pioneer League
Rocky Mountain Vibes	Colorado Springs	June 2019	Baseball	Pioneer League
Colorado Summit	Golden	May 7, 2022	Ultimate frisbee	Ultimate Frisbee Association

=== College athletics ===
The following universities and colleges participate in the National Collegiate Athletic Association Division I.

NCAA Division I athletic programs in Colorado
Team	School	City	Conference
Air Force Falcons	United States Air Force Academy	Colorado Springs	Mountain West (Note: Several Air Force teams participate in other conferences, or as independents, in sports that the MW does not sponsor: Boxing, a men-only sport that is not sanctioned by the NCAA, competes as an independent.; Fencing, a coeducational sport with men's and women's squads, also competes as an independent.; Men's and women's gymnastics both compete in the Mountain Pacific Sports Federation.; Men's ice hockey competes in Atlantic Hockey.; Men's lacrosse competes in the ASUN Conference.; Rifle, which at Air Force is a coeducational sport, competes in the Patriot Rifle Conference.; Men's soccer and women's swimming & diving compete in the Western Athletic Conference.; Men's wrestling competes in the Big 12 Conference.)
Colorado Buffaloes	University of Colorado Boulder	Boulder	Big 12 (Note: Several Colorado teams participate in other conferences in sports that the Big 12 does not sponsor: Men's and women's indoor track & field compete in the Mountain Pacific Sports Federation.; Skiing, a coeducational sport with men's and women's squads, competes in the Rocky Mountain Intercollegiate Ski Association.)
Colorado State Rams	Colorado State University	Fort Collins	Mountain West
Denver Pioneers	University of Denver	Denver	NCHC / Summit (Note: Several Denver teams participate in other conferences in sports that The Summit League does not sponsor: Women's gymnastics competes in the Big 12 Conference.; Men's ice hockey competes in the National Collegiate Hockey Conference.; Men's and women's lacrosse compete in the Big East Conference.; Skiing, a coeducational sport with men's and women's squads, competes in the Rocky Mountain Intercollegiate Ski Association.)
Northern Colorado Bears	University of Northern Colorado	Greeley	Big Sky (Note: Several Northern Colorado teams participate in other conferences in sports that the Big Sky does not sponsor: Baseball competes in the Summit League.; Women's swimming & diving competes in the Western Athletic Conference.; Men's wrestling competes in the Big 12 Conference.)
Colorado College Tigers	Colorado College	Colorado Springs	NCHC / Mountain West (Note: Colorado College, otherwise an NCAA Division III member, has two Division I teams. Men's ice hockey competes in the National Collegiate Hockey Conference and women's soccer competes in the Mountain West.)

== See also ==
- Bibliography of Colorado
- Geography of Colorado
- History of Colorado
- Index of Colorado-related articles
- List of Colorado-related lists
- Outline of Colorado

== Sources ==
- Josephy Jr., Alvin M. The Civil War in the American West. Alfred A. Knope, 1991. ISBN 0-394-56482-0
- Leonard, Stephen J.; Noel, Thomas Jacob (1990). Denver: Mining Camp to Metropolis. Niwot, Colorado: University Press of Colorado.
