= Kayvan Khalatbari =

Iranian-American entrepreneur (born 1983)

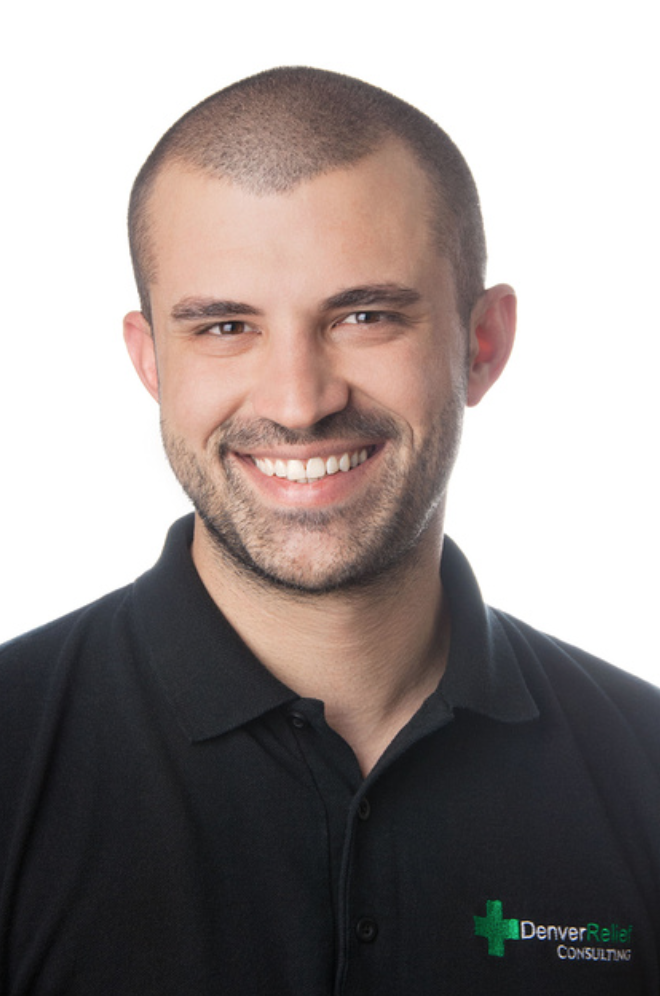
- Born: Kayvan Soorena Tyler Khalatbari-Limaki; August 1, 1983 (age 42); Lincoln, Nebraska, U.S.
- Occupation: Comedy

Kayvan Khalatbari (Kayvan Soorena Tyler Khalatbari-Limaki) is an Iranian-American entrepreneur; he was a mayoral candidate in Denver, Colorado, in 2019.

== Early life and education ==
On August 1, 1983, Kayvan Khalatbari was born in Lincoln, Nebraska to his father Abbas Khalatbari, an immigrant from Iran, and his mother Terri Ramel (now Terri Smith), a small-town Nebraskan.

After graduating from high school, Khalatbari earned an associate degree in architectural-engineering technology from the Milford campus of Southeast Community College at the age of 19. He worked at the Lincoln office of M.E. Group, a mechanical, electrical and plumbing engineering firm, before being transferred to their Denver office in 2004.

== Entrepreneurship ==
Khalatbar co-founded and funds birdy, an alternative culture magazine out of Denver featuring artwork, articles, and creative writing pieces from journalists, comedians, artists, and other local talent. In 2016, birdy. expanded its print run to 10,000 copies in cities including Denver, Los Angeles, Seattle, Fort Collins, Boulder, and Manitou Springs.

Khalatbari was one of the founders of Cresco Labs, a medical marijuana business. Kayvan served as Cresco Yeltrah's Executive Vice President of Operations. Cresco Labs company went public on the Canadian stock exchange in October 2018.

Khalatbari co-founded Denver Relief, a medical and adult-use cannabis dispensary, in May 2009; since regular business funding was unavailable, they founders used their own money. Denver Relief's cultivation facility was sold to Willie Nelson in July 2016; its dispensary licenses were sold to Terrapin Care Station.

In 2011, from the financial success of Denver Relief, Khalatbari opened the international consulting arm, Denver Relief Consulting, with Denver Relief’s GM, Andy Betts, and a co-owner of Denver Relief, Ean Seeb, who became the Governor's Special Adviser on Cannabis under Governor Jared Polis in 2019. Most of the firm's work is with out-of-state entities who are looking to get involved in cannabis-related businesses. In 2012, Khalatbari also served as a media spokesman, speaking about Colorado Amendment 64 (a ballot measure to amend Colorado's constitution, outlining a statewide drug policy for cannabis) to media outlets including CNN's Newsroom. He has worked with client groups in Illinois, Nevada, Maryland, Alaska, and Canada, advocating reform and creating business plans and applications for partners to establish operations in each. For example, Silver State Relief was the first medical marijuana dispensary to open in the state of Nevada when it launched on July 31, 2015 in Sparks, Nevada. Silver State worked with Khalatbari as a consultant during the development phases, and earned the highest score from the state licensure board.

Kayvan Khalatbari became part owner of High Times media in 2017 as part of Oreva Capital investment group. Oreva Capital now holds the controlling interest with a team additionally made up of Reggae legend Damian Marley and other notable cannabis entrepreneurs. The sale encompassed rights to the popular High Times Magazine, website, books, Cannabis Cup events, and more. Khalatbari hopes to see High Times cover more societal and cultural topics in the future including environmental best practices for the cannabis industry, protection of medical cannabis patient's rights, and expanded minority inclusion in the cannabis industry.

Sexpot Comedy is a comedy collective in Denver, producing or sponsoring more than 30 podcasts and more than a dozen weekly or monthly live events. In its August 2015 issue, GQ named Sexpot's monthly show one of the "5 Funniest Nights in America."

In 2008, Khalatbari left M.E. Group and entered into a partnership with other first-time entrepreneurs to purchase a struggling pizza restaurant in Capitol Hill. Sexy Pizza is now employee-owned and has four locations in central Denver and one in Kansas City. In 2014, the two stores combined were estimated to earn roughly $2.5 million.

== Advocacy and politics ==
=== 2015 Denver City Council Campaign ===
In January 2015, Khalatbari announced that he would enter the Denver City Council race as an At-Large candidate. His platform included initiatives in the cannabis and hemp industries; law enforcement reform; children's services; and affordable housing. The election was held May 5, 2015 and he came in fifth place.

=== 2019 Denver Mayoral Candidate ===
On Valentine’s Day 2017, Khalatbari officially announced his candidacy for the 2019 Denver Mayoral election. Khalatbari hoped to run on a platform aimed at improving conditions for the homeless, increasing police accountability, halting the I-70 expansion, developing DIY artist spaces, establishing Denver as a sanctuary city, encouraging increased civic engagement by business coalitions and individuals. During his campaign, he also advocated for establishing a public bank as a way to keep and manage funds from the Elevate Denver bonds in Denver as opposed to using outside banks. "The time is now, especially with all the fervor around national politics, which has shown us two things: One, anybody can win; two, if people stay inactive, bad things happen. Period," says Khalatbari. “I love this city. It’s given me everything I have in my career, friendships, love life and community organizing—Denver afforded me all of those opportunities,” he explains. “But the longer that I do business and [live] in this city, I realize the detriment this city is placing on the people that I care about. I can’t sit by and watch it anymore. I feel it’s incumbent on me as a business leader and community organizer to engage people and give them hope that they can make a difference.” Khalatbari ended his campaign citing "personal reasons" in October 2018.

=== Denver Kids ===
Denver Kids Inc. is a nonprofit that works with Denver Public Schools to pair at-risk students with educational counselors and community mentors. Khalatbari has been a “big brother” mentor for Denver Kids Inc. since 2007, and has been guiding his current “little brother” since 2009.

=== Drug policy ===
Khalatbari works toward more responsible drug policies. This work focuses on students, providing alternative activities, and education for all. He sits on the Board of Trustees for Students for Sensible Drug Policy, an international grassroots network of thousands of students from many universities who work to create sensible drug policies, minimize drug abuse, and fight back against the failing war on drugs. Khalatbari serves as a Board Member for the Harm Reduction Action Center (HRAC). HRAC provides training for first responders, police officers, and others.

==== Cannabis drug policy ====
===== Colorado =====
Khalatbari's involvement in cannabis drug policy started in 2004 when he moved to Denver and was looking to find a way to get involved and meet people. His brother Hassan found a group online called SAFER (Safer Alternative For Enjoyable Recreation), a marijuana legalization group that had just passed initiatives on University of Colorado and Colorado State University campuses to equalize cannabis possession with alcohol possession. The group centers on educating the public about cannabis benefits and the harmful consequences to consumers and society of alcohol, while encouraging policy reform. Colorado Amendment 44 was placed on the voting ballet after SAFER volunteers received over 129,000 signatures to put the act in place (only 68,000 were required by the Secretary of State in Colorado). Khalatbari started volunteering for the organization, collecting petition signatures and staging political protests in an effort to pass Initiated Question 100 (I-100). I-100 was a City of Denver ballot initiative, to legalize adult marijuana possession. The measure passed in the fall of 2005, making Denver the first U.S. city to vote to remove all penalties for adult marijuana possession. In 2006, SAFER's leader, Mason Tvert, encouraged Khalatbari to dress up in a chicken suit and "harass" then-Denver mayor John Hickenlooper at town hall meetings, even challenging Hickenlooper to a debate as the chicken, which had by then been named "Chickenlooper." Khalatbari revived the Chickenlooper costume and character to protest Hickenlooper's bid for re-election in the 2014 Colorado gubernatorial race. Chickenlooper also took part in a photo opp to protest Colorado's controversial "Don't Be a Lab Rat" campaign, aimed at curbing underage marijuana use. Khalatbari also became an active participant at Sensible Colorado, volunteering for patients’ rights and proactive regulation over cannabis. While volunteering at Sensible Colorado, Khalatbari met other industry activists and met his future business partners for Sexy Pizza, Denver Relief, and Denver Relief Consulting. In 2009, following these efforts, Khalatbari became a founding member of the Board of Directors for the Medical Marijuana Assistance Program of America (MMAPA), an organization that worked to raise awareness of the positive attributes of medical cannabis use, decrease the negative social stigma correlated with cannabis, and provide aid to patients who are unable to afford access to cannabis medicine. The organization shut down in 2012.

Khalatbari was the "lead backer" behind Denver’s Initiative 300, a comprehensive measure that allows for the public consumption of Cannabis. The measure was created in response to the city's lack of regulation regarding legal Cannabis, which has left many tourists and residents without legal places to consume up to that point. Initiative 300 was endorsed by the Denver Post, the Democratic Party, and a host of local businesses.

===== Minority Cannabis Business Association =====
Khalatbari has been appointed to the Minority Cannabis Business Association's (MCBA) Board of Directors. As one of the few minority Cannabis business owners in the United States, Khalatbari has been disheartened by the lack of access and involvement opportunities for minorities and is actively striving to generate care and support for this topic. Most recently, MCBA led the development of model legislation inclusive of every aspect of marijuana legalization. The model legislation will provide a guide for policy makers across the country to reform marijuana laws in a way that makes cannabis business ownership accessible to minorities, provides drug war reparations via marijuana tax revenue to communities of color, calls for stronger legal protections for those who use cannabis and allows for expungement of marijuana-related convictions that are no longer illegal under new laws. As a member of the MCBA, Khalatbari has raised concerns about how this model legislation is being implemented in some states, such as Illinois where he believes it will have the opposite of its intended effect and make it more difficult for minorities to enter the cannabis industry in an equitable way due to the short application window and high costs.

=== Homelessness ===
A video he posted to his social media account, of Denver Police Department Officers confiscating blankets from homeless people in freezing conditions went viral. Kayvan's video made the front page of the Huffington Post and prompted civil rights organizations such as the ACLU and NAACP to write letters and threaten lawsuits against Mayor Michael Hancock and the City of Denver. Facing pressure, Mayor Hancock lifted the "urban camping ban" until April 2017 to get the homeless population through cold winter months. In March 2017, he found success as a principal member of the Alternative Solutions Advocacy Project (ASAP) by helping to get the first tiny-home village for the homeless approved in Denver. Beloved Community Village was established as a 180-day pilot program for individuals experiencing homelessness to create a democratically self-governed community aimed at self-empowerment and reestablishing lives. The village officially open on July 21, 2017 and consisted of 11 houses, showers, restrooms, and a yurt for cooking and village events. The site moved to a semi-permanent location in the Globeville neighborhood, which may allow them to stay for up to 4 years. Though previous efforts to open a trans-inclusive women's only facility at St. Andrews's Episcopal Church were initially denied in July 2018, the group is in the process of choosing a new site and hoped to begin building before the end of 2019, with a possible site at Clara Brown Commons. In July 2018, the Barton Institute for Philanthropy and Social Enterprise at the University of Denver issued a study which concluded that the project has been a success for the overall community.

Kayvan Khalatbari serves on the CVC Board and supports homelessness through Sexy Pizza.
