= Khalatbari =

Khalatbari is a surname. Notable people with the surname include:

- Mohammad Vali Khan Khalatbari Tonekaboni (1846–1926), the leader of the Constitutionalist Revolutionary Forces
- Abbas Ali Khalatbari (1912–1979), Iranian diplomat
- Anahita Khalatbari, American journalist
- Arsalan Khalatbari (1904–1976), Iranian lawyer and politician
- Firouzeh Khalatbari, Iranian economist
- Hooman Khalatbari, Iranian-Austrian pianist and conductor
- Hossein Khalatbari (1949–1985), Iranian fighter pilot
- Kayvan Khalatbari, Iranian-American entrepreneur
- Mohammad Reza Khalatbari (footballer, born 1948) (1948–2016), Iranian football player and coach
- Mohammad Reza Khalatbari (footballer, born 1983), Iranian football player
