= List of Colorado ballot measures =

The U.S. state of Colorado has had a system of direct voting since gaining statehood in 1876. Citizens and the Colorado General Assembly both have the ability to place new legislation, those recently passed by the General Assembly, and constitutional amendments on the ballot for a popular vote. Colorado has three types of ballot measures that can be voted on in a statewide election: initiatives, referendums, and legislatively referred measures. For a measure to be placed on the ballot, supporters must gather signatures from registered voters. From 1877 to 1910, the only ballot measures allowed were legislatively referred measures. In 1910, Referendum 3 was placed on the ballot by the General Assembly and passed, creating a citizen-led process for initiatives and referendums. The first successful citizen-initiated measures were passed in 1912.

Since that time, ballot measures have played a major role in Colorado politics. After Denver was awarded the hosting rights to the 1976 Winter Olympics, citizens moved to block funding the games with a referendum in 1972. A 1990 ballot measure instituting term limits for many elected officials helped galvanize a nationwide movement for term limits, and in 2000 Amendment 20 legalized the medical use of marijuana. That measure was followed by full legalization in 2012 with Amendment 64, and the legalization of psilocybin mushrooms in 2022 with Proposition 122.

== Background ==
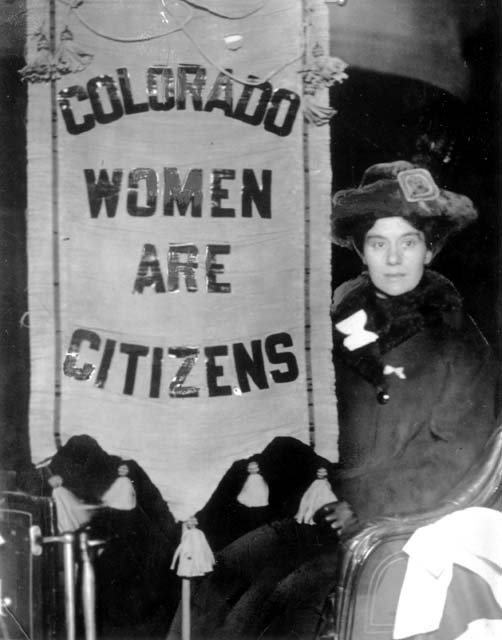
A Colorado woman campaigns for women's suffrage

The 1876 Constitution of Colorado included procedures for the General Assembly to place measures on the ballot in a statewide election. In the 1890s, a grassroots movement to increase citizen power began, culminating in a special session of the legislature to discuss initiative and referendums in 1910. That session resulted in 1910's Referendum 3, which passed with over 76% of the vote and created a citizen-initiated process.

Propositions are statutory and amend the Colorado Revised Statutes, whereas amendments change the state constitution. From 1877 to 2016, constitutional amendments, like propositions, required only a simple majority to pass. Following the passage of Amendment 71 in 2016, amendments require 55% of the vote to pass, unless the amendment is to remove language from the constitution. Referred propositions and amendments are lettered, whereas citizen initiatives are numbered.

In 2020, as part of his administration's response to the COVID-19 pandemic, Governor Jared Polis issued an emergency rule allowing petition signature gatherers to do so via email and mail, rather than in-person efforts. The change, while upheld by the Denver District Court, was overturned by the Colorado Supreme Court later that year.

After the 1876 Constitution was adopted, a legislatively referred constitutional amendment that would have granted women the right to vote was placed on the ballot for the 1877 election. The measure failed, with over two-thirds of voters against it. Henry Blackwell, a founder of the American Woman Suffrage Association, summed up the unsuccessful campaign by saying "Woman Suffrage can never be carried by a popular vote without a political party behind it". Blackwell was proven correct in 1893 when, in part due to gains made by the Colorado People's Party in the General Assembly, voters supported a women's suffrage ballot measure by a 55%–45% margin.

In 1970, the International Olympic Committee granted Denver hosting rights for the 1976 Winter Olympics. Governor John Love claimed that the games would cost taxpayers only $5,000,000. Activists quickly noted a wide variety of issues with the state's cost estimate, however, including a lack of transportation infrastructure, no planning for the Olympic Village, and issues with planned events sites. A petition for 1972's Measure 8 quickly reached the necessary 51,000 signatures and 60% of Coloradans voted to prohibit the state from funding the Olympics. Later estimates found that the cost for Denver to host the games would have been $92,000,000, over 18 times the state's estimate. Richard Lamm, who was a leader in the local anti-Olympics movement, would later parlay his fame from the measure into three terms as Governor.

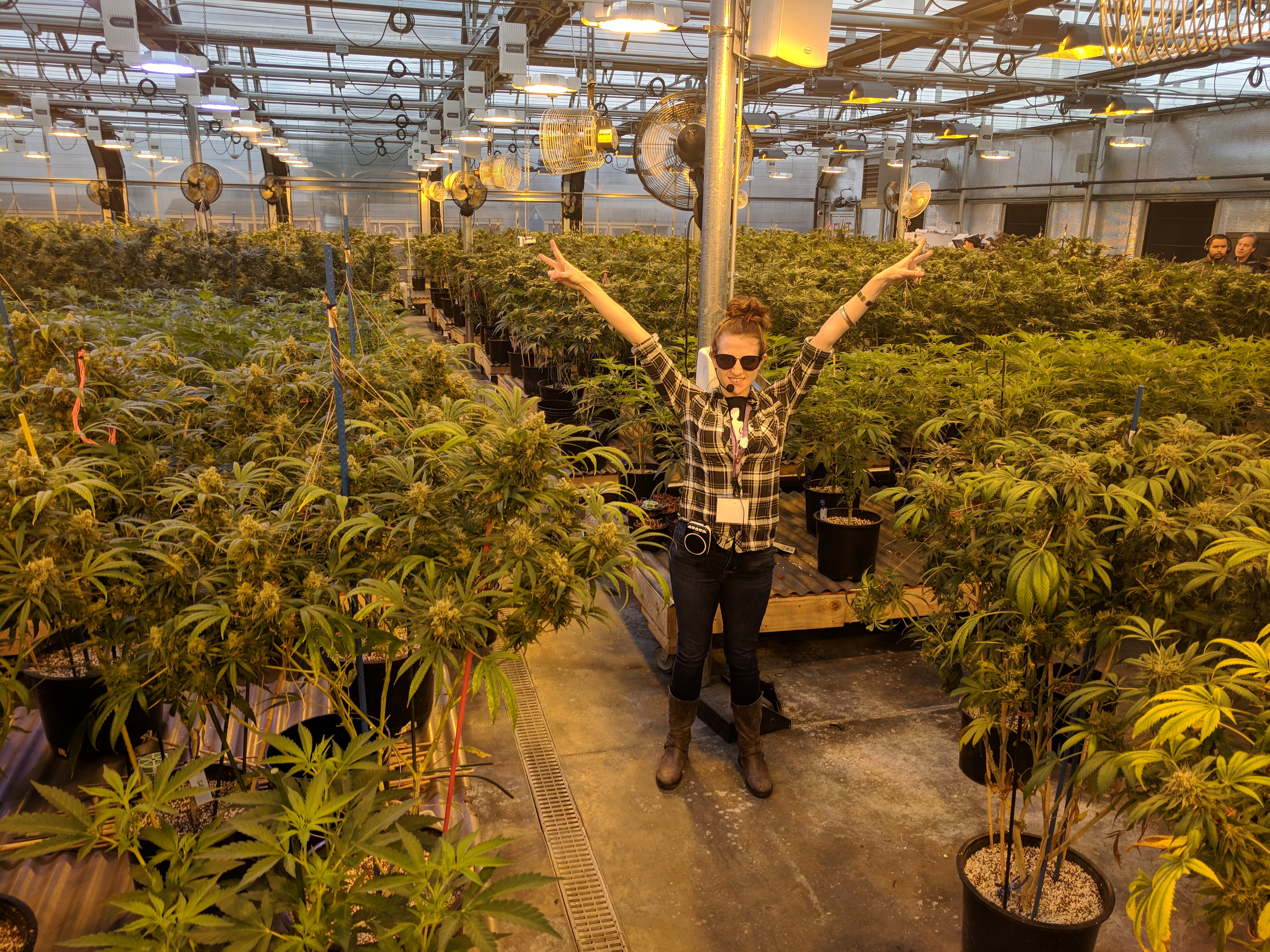
Commercial marijuana operations, such as the one pictured, were legalized as a result of 2012's Amendment 64.

The 1984 ballot included Amendment 3, which barred the use of state funds for abortion services. The measure passed by less than one percentage point and gave Colorado the distinction of being both the first state to decriminalize abortion, having done so in 1967, and the first state to prohibit the government from funding it. 1990's Amendment 5 has been credited by the Initiative & Referendum Institute as having started the term limits movement in the United States and was followed by similar initiatives in 1994 and 1996. Colorado's efforts were unique because they placed term limits on members of Congress in addition to state-level officials. The term-limits movement resulted in the Supreme Court case U.S. Term Limits, Inc. v. Thornton (1995), which determined that states could not place restrictions on congresspeople beyond the constitutional requirements.

In 2000, Amendment 20 passed with 54% of the vote and legalized the medical use of marijuana in the state. It was followed by 2012's Amendment 64, which passed by similar margins and legalized the recreational use of marijuana. The Economist described the vote as "an electoral first not only for America but for the world." Colorado continued this trend of loosening drug policy in 2022 when voters passed Proposition 122 and legalized the use of psilocybin mushrooms in designated "healing centers".

== Types of ballot measures ==
=== Citizen-initiated ===
The Constitution of Colorado grants citizens some initiative and referendum powers in Article V. In order for a measure to be placed on the ballot, a petition must receive signatures equal to 5% of the votes cast in the previous election. The governor's veto power does not extend to citizen-initiated measures, which go into effect within one month of election returns being certified.

- Initiatives create new state statutes or constitutional amendments. They may be placed on the ballot if their petition is filed at least three months before the upcoming election.
- Referendums repeal legislation passed in the previous General Assembly session. They may be placed on the ballot if their petition is filed at least 90 days after the previous General Assembly session adjourns.

=== Government-initiated ===
At the General Assembly's discretion, the legislature may place additional measures on the ballot. Article XIX of the Constitution requires that constitutional amendments passed by the legislature be voted on in the next general election. The General Assembly can also vote to place statute changes and proposed spending on the general election ballot.

== 1800s ==
=== 1877 ===
Ballot Measures from 1877
| Measure name | Description | Status | Yes votes | No votes |
|---|---|---|---|---|
| Referendum 1 | A constitutional amendment granting women the right to vote | Failed | 6,612 (32.00%) | 14,053 (68.00%) |

=== 1880 ===
Ballot Measures from 1880
| Measure name | Description | Status | Yes votes | No votes |
|---|---|---|---|---|
| Amendment 1 | A constitutional amendment requiring uniform taxation | Passed | 19,198 (84.80%) | 3,436 (15.20%) |

=== 1881 ===
Ballot Measures from 1881
| Measure name | Description | Status | Yes votes | No votes |
|---|---|---|---|---|
| State Capital Referendum | A referendum on whether the permanent location of the state capital should be Denver or some other location (Note: The question on the ballot was multiple-choice with a variety of different options, including Pueblo, Colorado Springs, Cañon City, Salida, and a write-in option.) | Passed | 30,248 (66.48%) | 15,249 (33.52%) (Note: The "no" vote was broken up between Pueblo (6,047), Colorado Springs (4,790), Cañon City (2,788), Salida (695), and write-ins (929).) |

=== 1882 ===
Ballot Measures from 1882
| Measure name | Description | Status | Yes votes | No votes |
|---|---|---|---|---|
| Amendment 2 | A constitutional amendment establishing salaries for some state officials | Passed | 32,858 (79.00%) | 8,738 (21.00%) |

=== 1884 ===
Ballot Measures from 1884
| Measure name | Description | Status | Yes votes | No votes |
|---|---|---|---|---|
| Amendment 3(a) | A constitutional amendment modifying some General Assembly procedures | Passed | 47,020 (88.00%) | 6,413 (12.00%) |
| Amendment 3(b) | A constitutional amendment modifying some General Assembly procedures | Passed | 45,080 (87.90%) | 6,188 (12.10%) |
| Amendment 3(c) | A constitutional amendment modifying some General Assembly procedures | Passed | 45,394 (88.00%) | 6,180 (12.00%) |

=== 1886 ===
Ballot Measures from 1886
| Measure name | Description | Status | Yes votes | No votes |
|---|---|---|---|---|
| Amendment 4 | A constitutional amendment vesting judicial power in the state court system | Passed | 17,068 (63.90%) | 9,629 (36.10%) |
| Amendment 5 | A constitutional amendment relating to "original jurisdiction" | Passed | 16,897 (64.10%) | 9,453 (35.90%) |
| Amendment 6 | A constitutional amendment providing for additional judges on the Colorado Supreme Court | Failed | 6,478 (30.00%) | 15,132 (70.00%) |
| Amendment 7 | A constitutional amendment allowing the General Assembly to establish criminal courts | Failed | 7,549 (29.00%) | 18,512 (71.00%) |
| Amendment 8 | A constitutional amendment allowing the General Assembly to create police magistrates | Failed | 7,148 (27.80%) | 18,553 (72.20%) |
| Amendment 9 | A constitutional amendment relating to judges on Colorado district courts | Passed | 14,938 (57.90%) | 10,867 (42.10%) |
| Amendment 10 | A constitutional amendment allowing the General Assembly to modify the state court system | Passed | 14,568 (51.00%) | 14,022 (49.00%) |

=== 1887 ===
Ballot Measures from 1887
| Measure name | Description | Status | Yes votes | No votes |
|---|---|---|---|---|
| Measure 1 | A constitutional amendment relating to the public debt | Passed | -- | -- |

=== 1888 ===
Ballot Measures from 1888
| Measure name | Description | Status | Yes votes | No votes |
|---|---|---|---|---|
| Measure 1 | A constitutional amendment limiting the reasons to contract public debt | Passed | 15,212 (53.20%) | 13,385 (46.80%) |
| Measure 2 | A constitutional amendment raising property taxes | Failed | 749 (7.90%) | 8,778 (92.10%) |
| Measure 3 | A constitutional amendment limiting the reasons to contract public debt | Passed | 13,921 (51.30%) | 13,209 (48.70%) |
| Measure 4 | A constitutional amendment limiting the reasons to contract public debt | Passed | -- | -- |

=== 1890 ===
Ballot Measures from 1890
| Measure name | Description | Status | Yes votes | No votes |
|---|---|---|---|---|
| Measure 1 | A constitutional amendment modifying the size and salaries of the Colorado Supreme Court | Failed | 15,283 (42.10%) | 20,991 (57.90%) |
| Measure 2 | A constitutional amendment relating to "compensation and services" | Failed | 15,395 (43.40%) | 20,078 (56.60%) |

=== 1892 ===
Ballot Measures from 1892
| Measure name | Description | Status | Yes votes | No votes |
|---|---|---|---|---|
| Measure 1 | A constitutional amendment relating to uniform taxation | Passed | 13,713 (52.70%) | 12,294 (47.30%) |
| Measure 3 | A constitutional amendment relating to the maximum tax rate | Passed | 12,440 (51.50%) | 11,731 (48.50%) |

=== 1893 ===
Ballot Measures from 1893
| Measure name | Description | Status | Yes votes | No votes |
|---|---|---|---|---|
| Measure 2 | A constitutional amendment granting women the right to vote (Note: The General Assembly lists this referendum as having taken place in 1892, however, it actually took place in November 1893.) | Passed | 35,798 (54.90%) | 29,451 (45.10%) |

=== 1894 ===
Ballot Measures from 1894
| Measure name | Description | Status | Yes votes | No votes |
|---|---|---|---|---|
| Measure 1 | A constitutional amendment relating to locality's "pledging of credit" | Failed | 26,434 (33.80%) | 51,711 (66.20%) |
| Measure 2 | A constitutional amendment relating to limits on state debt | Failed | 22,393 (29.50%) | 53,634 (70.50%) |
| Measure 3 | A constitutional amendment relating to city debt | Failed | 21,293 (29.70%) | 50,513 (70.30%) |

=== 1896 ===
Ballot Measures from 1896
| Measure name | Description | Status | Yes votes | No votes |
|---|---|---|---|---|
| Measure 1 | A constitutional amendment relating to limits on state debt | Failed | 25,340 (38.90%) | 39,790 (61.10%) |

== 1900–1949 ==
=== 1900 ===
Ballot Measures from 1900
| Measure name | Description | Status | Yes votes | No votes |
|---|---|---|---|---|
| Measure 1 | A constitutional amendment relating to the process to amend the constitution | Passed | 31,471 (73.10%) | 11,568 (26.90) |

=== 1902 ===
Ballot Measures from 1902
| Measure name | Description | Status | Yes votes | No votes |
|---|---|---|---|---|
| Measure 1 | A constitutional amendment relating to the election process for county commissioners | Passed | 49,646 (65.10%) | 26,559 (34.90%) |
| Measure 2 | A constitutional amendment relating to the city and county of Denver | Passed | 59,750 (69.90%) | 25,767 (30.1%) |
| Measure 3 | A constitutional amendment relating to the eight-hour work day | Passed | 72,980 (73.50%) | 26,266 (26.50%) |
| Measure 4 | A constitutional amendment relating to voter qualifications | Passed | 44,769 (62.30%) | 27,077 (37.70%) |
| Measure 5 | A constitutional amendment relating to the election process for district attorneys | Passed | 45,191 (64.20%) | 25,243 (35.80%) |
| Measure 6 | A constitutional amendment relating to property tax exemptions | Failed | 32,710 (31.10%) | 72,370 (68.90%) |
| Measure 7 | A constitutional amendment relating to tax limits | Failed | 31,527 (31.10%) | 69,741 (68.90%) |
| Measure 8 | A constitutional amendment relating to the election process for justices of the peace | Passed | 48,682 (65.10%) | 26,082 (34.90%) |
| Measure 9 | A constitutional amendment relating to the election process for county officials | Passed | 48,944 (65.20%) | 26,140 (34.80%) |
| Measure 10 | A constitutional amendment relating to the election process for county judges | Passed | 44,856 (63.90%) | 25,326 (36.10%) |

=== 1904 ===
Ballot Measures from 1904
| Measure name | Description | Status | Yes votes | No votes |
|---|---|---|---|---|
| Measure 1 | A constitutional amendment relating to exemptions to uniform taxation | Passed | 42,696 (80.30%) | 10,444 (19.70%) |
| Measure 2 | A constitutional amendment relating to the Colorado Supreme Court | Passed | 5,863 (56.40%) | 4,528 (43.60%) |
| Measure 3 | A constitutional amendment relating to the Colorado Supreme Court | Passed | 5,006 (54.50%) | 4,174 (45.50%) |
| Measure 4 | A constitutional amendment relating to the Colorado Supreme Court | Passed | 5,389 (55.70%) | 4,293 (44.30%) |
| Measure 5 | A constitutional amendment relating to the Colorado Supreme Court | Passed | 5,264 (55.50%) | 4,218 (44.50%) |

=== 1906 ===
Ballot Measures from 1906
| Measure name | Description | Status | Yes votes | No votes |
|---|---|---|---|---|
| Measure 1 | A constitutional amendment relating to the election process and voting machines | Passed | 27,460 (72.40%) | 10,467 (27.60%) |

=== 1908 ===
Ballot Measures from 1908
| Measure name | Description | Status | Yes votes | No votes |
|---|---|---|---|---|
| Referendum 1 | A constitutional amendment allowing the state to issue bonds for the purpose of paying outstanding warrants | Failed | 26,254 (48.98%) | 27,352 (51.02%) |
| Referendum 2 | A constitutional amendment modifying the salaries of state officials and judges | Failed | 16,088 (29.88%) | 37,753 (70.12%) |
| Referendum 3 | A constitutional amendment modifying the salaries of county officials | Failed | 18,558 (39.00%) | 29,022 (61.00%) |

=== 1910 ===
Ballot Measures from 1910
| Measure name | Description | Status | Yes votes | No votes |
|---|---|---|---|---|
| Referendum 1 | A constitutional amendment allowing the state to issue bonds for the purpose of paying outstanding warrants | Passed | 40,054 (50.39%) | 39,441 (49.61%) |
| Referendum 2 | A constitutional amendment modifying the Colorado Board of Land Commissioners | Passed | 42,128 (66.42%) | 21,300 (33.58%) |
| Referendum 3 | A constitutional amendment creating an initiative and referendum process in the state | Passed | 89,141 (76.95%) | 26,698 (23.05%) |
| Referendum 4 | A constitutional amendment modifying the salaries of state legislators | Passed | 39,245 (55.83%) | 31,047 (44.17%) |
| Referendum 5 | A constitutional amendment relating to higher education institutions | Passed | 59,295 (79.70%) | 15,105 (20.30%) |

=== 1912 ===
Ballot Measures from 1912
| Measure name | Description | Status | Yes votes | No votes |
|---|---|---|---|---|
| Measure 1 | A constitutional amendment prohibiting alcoholic beverages statewide | Failed | 75,877 (39.39%) | 116,774 (60.61%) |
| Measure 2 | An initiative allowing search and seizure to enforce prohibition laws | Failed | 64,616 (44.93%) | 79,190 (55.07%) |
| Measure 3 | An initiative creating an eight-hour workday for female employees | Passed | 108,959 (77.29%) | 32,019 (22.71%) |
| Measure 4 | An initiative establishing regulations for public service corporations | Failed | 30,347 (32.12%) | 64,138 (67.88%) |
| Measure 5 | An initiative establishing a Colorado State Fair | Failed | 49,102 (48.35%) | 52,462 (51.65%) |
| Measure 6 | A constitutional amendment allocating funds for the Colorado Immigration Bureau | Failed | 30,359 (35.87%) | 54,272 (64.13%) |
| Measure 7 | An initiative introducing cost-saving measures for publicizing future ballot measures | Failed | 39,551 (43.85%) | 50,635 (56.15%) |
| Measure 8 | A constitutional amendment allowing home rule for counties | Passed | 49,596 (52.55%) | 44,778 (47.45%) |
| Measure 9 | A constitutional amendment establishing a recall process for elected officials | Passed | 53,620 (57.54%) | 39,564 (42.46%) |
| Measure 10 | An initiative modifying election laws | Failed | 37,616 (49.40%) | 38,537 (50.60%) |
| Measure 11 | An initiative establishing a special election system for ballot measures | Failed | 33,413 (45.12%) | 40,634 (54.88%) |
| Measure 12 | A constitutional amendment establishing a definition for "contempt of court" and allowing for jury trials for such charges | Failed | 31,850 (43.21%) | 41,855 (56.79%) |
| Measure 13 | A constitutional amendment establishing a public utilities court with exclusive power over rates | Failed | 27,534 (34.70%) | 51,820 (65.30%) |
| Measure 14 | An initiative providing for a "headless ballot" to be used in elections | Passed | 43,390 (52.34%) | 39,504 (47.66%) |
| Measure 15 | A constitutional amendment extending wider control of schools to the public | Failed | 38,318 (40.76%) | 55,691 (59.24%) |
| Measure 16 | A constitutional amendment establishing juvenile courts in localities with populations greater than 100,000 people | Passed | 55,416 (57.54%) | 40,891 (42.46%) |
| Measure 17 | An initiative to allocate some public aid to supporting the children of single mothers | Passed | 82,337 (68.50%) | 37,870 (31.50%) |
| Measure 18 | An initiative modifying the laws relating to civil service | Passed | 38,426 (52.13%) | 35,282 (47.87%) |
| Measure 19 | An initiative establishing an eight-hour workday for people working in underground mines, smelters, mills, and coke ovens | Passed | 52,525 (51.85%) | 48,777 (48.15%) |
| Measure 20 | An initiative allocating control of some funds to the Colorado Highway Commission | Failed | 44,568 (49.70%) | 45,101 (50.30%) |
| Measure 21 | A referendum to uphold a law requiring teacher examinations | Failed | 25,369 (31.93%) | 54,086 (68.07%) |
| Measure 22 | A referendum upholding a law modifying water rights relating to irrigation | Failed | 22,931 (32.51%) | 47,614 (67.49%) |
| Measure 23 | A referendum upholding a law which altered the rules surrounding the branding of livestock | Failed | 37,387 (49.77%) | 337,740 (50.23%) |
| Measure 24 | A constitutional amendment replacing the Colorado Board of Equalization with the Colorado Tax Commission | Failed | 32,548 (44.86%) | 40,012 (55.14%) |
| Measure 25 | A referendum upholding a law which established an eight-hour workday for people working in underground mines, smelters, and coke ovens | Passed | 69,489 (69.16%) | 30,992 (30.84%) |
| Measure 26 | A referendum upholding a law requiring teachers to attend summer trainings | Failed | 23,521 (27.10%) | 63,266 (72.90%) |
| Measure 27 | A constitutional amendment allowing county officials to be paid from outside sources | Failed | 28,889 (40.97%) | 41,622 (59.03%) |
| Measure 28 | A constitutional amendment raising the limitation on county debts | Failed | 29,741 (38.61%) | 47,284 (61.39%) |
| Measure 29 | A referendum upholding a law which changed some rules related to the management of public funds | Failed | 20,968 (32.12%) | 44,322 (67.88%) |
| Measure 30 | A constitutional amendment defining mining and smelting as public interests | Failed | 35,997 (48.68%) | 37,953 (51.32%) |
| Measure 31 | A constitutional amendment allowing the state to issue bonds for the purpose of funding state highways | Failed | 36,636 (40.72%) | 53,327 (59.28%) |
| Measure 32 | An initiative authorizing the construction of a tunnel through James Peak | Failed | 45,800 (32.95%) | 93,183 (67.05%) |

=== 1914 ===
Ballot Measures from 1914
| Measure name | Description | Status | Yes votes | No votes |
|---|---|---|---|---|
| Measure 1 | A constitutional amendment requiring that rejected measures not be placed on the ballot again until six years have passed | Failed | 55,667 (33.09%) | 112,537 (66.91%) |
| Measure 2 | A constitutional amendment prohibiting alcohol | Passed | 129,589 (52.30%) | 118,176 (47.70%) |
| Measure 3 | A constitutional amendment allowing women to serve as jurors and requiring 3/4 of jurors to agree for a verdict to be reached | Failed | 67,130 (46.42%) | 77,488 (53.58%) |
| Measure 4 | A constitutional amendment creating a process by which citizens could petition for a special election solely for ballot measures | Failed | 40,643 (33.42%) | 80,977 (66.58%) |
| Measure 5 | An initiative to codify some laws relating to women and children | Failed | 68,242 (48.62%) | 72,122 (51.38%) |
| Measure 6 | An initiative providing for probation in criminal cases involving minors and first offenders | Failed | 62,561 (47.73%) | 68,512 (52.27%) |
| Measure 7 | An initiative increasing the state roads fund for the purpose of constructing new highways | Passed | 117,146 (68.51%) | 53,844 (31.49%) |
| Measure 8 | A constitutional amendment defining newspapers as public utilities | Failed | 35,752 (28.11%) | 91,426 (71.89%) |
| Measure 9 | A referendum upholding a law relating to the capitalization of public utilities | Failed | 37,633 (37.20%) | 63,603 (62.80%) |
| Measure 10 | A referendum upholding a law relating to the licensing and regulation of commission merchants | Failed | 39,448 (36.90%) | 67,454 (63.10%) |
| Measure 11 | A referendum upholding a law relieving employees from assuming risk of injury or death | Passed | 69,006 (53.37%) | 60,298 (46.63%) |
| Measure 12 | A referendum upholding a law which altered the peace officer appointment process | Failed | 49,116 (42.36%) | 66,836 (57.64%) |
| Measure 13 | A referendum upholding a law relating to a public utilities commission | Failed | 39,703 (37.85%) | 65,182 (62.15%) |
| Measure 14 | A constitutional amendment allowing localities sixty years to make up for any indebtedness | Failed | 38,589 (37.18%) | 65,206 (62.82%) |
| Measure 15 | A constitutional amendment relating to the equalization of tax assessments | Passed | 55,987 (50.32%) | 55,275 (49.68%) |
| Measure 16 | An initiative introducing cost-saving measures for publicizing future ballot measures | Failed | 48,301 (46.19%) | 56,259 (53.81%) |

=== 1916 ===
Ballot Measures from 1916
| Measure name | Description | Status | Yes votes | No votes |
|---|---|---|---|---|
| Measure 1 | A referendum upholding a law relating to medical practice regulation | Passed | 96,879 (54.06%) | 82,317 (45.94%) |
| Measure 2 | A constitutional amendment to codify the state civil service | Failed | 62,458 (39.28%) | 96,561 (60.72%) |
| Measure 3 | A constitutional amendment exempting beer from existing prohibitions on alcohol | Failed | 77,345 (32.16%) | 163,134 (67.84%) |
| Measure 4 | An initiative establishing treatment procedures for people with mental illnesses | Passed | 164,220 (80.64%) | 39,415 (19.36%) |
| Measure 5 | An initiative abolishing the Colorado Tax Commission and transferring its duties to the Colorado Board of Equalization | Failed | 80,362 (48.89%) | 84,011 (51.11%) |
| Measure 6 | An initiative relating to the regulation of livestock running | Failed | 85,279 (35.47%) | 155,134 (64.53%) |
| Measure 7 | An initiative allowing for the investment of public school funds | Passed | 102,956 (60.92%) | 66,058 (39.08%) |
| Measure 8 | An measure calling for a constitutional convention | Failed | 53,530 (43.48%) | 69,579 (56.52%) |

=== 1918 ===
Ballot Measures from 1918
| Measure name | Description | Status | Yes votes | No votes |
|---|---|---|---|---|
| Measure 1 | An initiative providing public aid for blind adults | Passed | 131,469 (93.30%) | 9,440 (6.70%) |
| Measure 2 | A constitutional amendment codifying the state civil service | Passed | 75,301 (64.59%) | 41,287 (35.41%) |
| Measure 3 | An initiative strengthening existing alcohol prohibition | Passed | 113,636 (63.71%) | 64,740 (36.29%) |
| Measure 4 | A constitutional amendment limiting the time for state legislators to introduce bills from 25 days to 15 days | Passed | 67,693 (77.28%) | 19,901 (22.72%) |
| Measure 5 | A constitutional amendment relating to the publication of ballot measures before the election | Passed | 98,715 (88.97%) | 12,237 (11.03%) |

=== 1920 ===
Ballot Measures from 1920
| Measure name | Description | Status | Yes votes | No votes |
|---|---|---|---|---|
| Measure 1 | An initiative establishing fixed hours for city fire department employees | Passed | 113,140 (57.80%) | 82,596 (42.20%) |
| Measure 2 | An initiative requiring the licensing and regulation of chiropractors | Failed | 84,286 (43.52%) | 109,385 (56.48%) |
| Measure 3 | An initiative creating a county called Limon County | Failed | 34,881 (19.81%) | 141,239 (80.19%) |
| Measure 4 | An initiative creating a county called Flagler County | Failed | 33,295 (19.17%) | 140,363 (80.83%) |
| Measure 5 | A constitutional amendment allowing the state to issue bonds for the purpose of building the Moffat, Monarch, and San Juan Tunnels | Failed | 101,841 (44.68%) | 126,099 (55.32%) |
| Measure 6 | An initiative allocating $350,000 for the creation of a Psychopathic Hospital and Laboratory (equivalent to $5,625,000 in 2025) | Passed | 155,049 (75.51%) | 50,295 (24.49%) |
| Measure 7 | A constitutional amendment creating a property tax for the purpose of funding state educational facilities | Passed | 160,268 (75.39%) | 52,324 (24.61%) |
| Measure 8 | A constitutional amendment authorizing the state to issue a $5,000,000 bond for the purpose of constructing new highways (equivalent to $80,357,143 in 2025) | Passed | 100,130 (58.51%) | 70,997 (41.49%) |
| Measure 9 | A constitutional amendment increasing the number of county judges | Failed | 35,095 (26.49%) | 97,398 (73.51%) |
| Measure 10 | A constitutional amendment increasing the salaries of constitutional offices and judges | Failed | 49,313 (30.40%) | 112,878 (69.60%) |

=== 1922 ===
Ballot Measures from 1922
| Measure name | Description | Status | Yes votes | No votes |
|---|---|---|---|---|
| Measure 1 | A constitutional amendment allowing the state to issue $1,500,000 in bonds for the purpose of constructing new highways (equivalent to $28,851,889 in 2025) | Passed | 131,271 (66.36%) | 66,536 (33.64%) |
| Measure 2 | A constitutional amendment creating a public utilities commission | Failed | 75,061 (41.08%) | 107,655 (58.92%) |
| Measure 3 | An initiative reapportioning seats in the Colorado General Assembly | Failed | 61,502 (37.72%) | 101,537 (62.28%) |
| Measure 4 | A constitutional amendment allowing the legislature to issue some exemptions from the ad valorem tax and create an income tax | Failed | 42,466 (26.08%) | 120,355 (73.92%) |
| Measure 5 | An initiative relating to experimental operations on humans and animals | Failed | 35,476 (16.61%) | 178,120 (83.39%) |
| Measure 6 | A measure calling for a constitutional convention | Failed | 53,015 (36.29%) | 93,081 (63.71%) |
| Measure 7 | A constitutional amendment relating to the location and control of higher education institutions | Passed | 87,282 (59.95%) | 58,315 (40.05%) |
| Measure 8 | A constitutional amendment establishing four-year terms for some county officials | Failed | 37,945 (26.40%) | 105,782 (73.60%) |
| Measure 9 | A constitutional amendment establishing four-year terms for some state officials | Failed | 40,081 (28.54%) | 100,367 (71.46%) |
| Measure 10 | A constitutional amendment allowing the legislature to grant non-citizens the ability to own property | Failed | 43,074 (31.15%) | 95,219 (68.85%) |

=== 1924 ===
Ballot Measures from 1924
| Measure name | Description | Status | Yes votes | No votes |
|---|---|---|---|---|
| Measure 1 | A constitutional amendment establishing a state printer and a printing building committee | Failed | 32,150 (12.48%) | 225,505 (87.52%) |
| Measure 2 | A constitutional amendment authorizing the state to issue bonds for the purpose of paying bonuses to military members | Failed | 91,510 (43.35%) | 119,586 (56.65%) |
| Measure 3 | A constitutional amendment allowing the legislature to set salaries for state officials | Failed | 67,230 (34.20%) | 129,344 (65.80%) |

=== 1926 ===
Ballot Measures from 1926
| Measure name | Description | Status | Yes votes | No votes |
|---|---|---|---|---|
| Measure 1 | A constitutional amendment allowing the General Assembly to set salaries for state officials and judges | Failed | 95,625 (47.73%) | 104,709 (52.27%) |
| Measure 2 | A constitutional amendment allowing the General Assembly to set salaries for county officials | Failed | 60,086 (33.69%) | 118,284 (66.31%) |
| Measure 3 | A constitutional amendment allowing the legislature to modify vehicle registration fees | Failed | 68,459 (33.77%) | 134,292 (66.23%) |
| Measure 5 | A constitutional amendment allowing the General Assembly to regulate alcohol | Failed | 107,749 (41.06%) | 154,672 (58.94%) |
| Measure 6 | An initiative allowing dentists licensed in other states to practice in Colorado | Failed | 56,433 (23.59%) | 182,816 (76.41%) |
| Measure 7 | A constitutional amendment creating a public utilities commission | Failed | 35,137 (17.88%) | 161,372 (82.12%) |
| Measure 8 | An initiative creating a fuel tax and vehicle registration fees and mandating that all revenues be used exclusively for roads | Failed | 81,762 (35.98%) | 145,482 (64.02%) |

=== 1928 ===
Ballot Measures from 1928
| Measure name | Description | Status | Yes votes | No votes |
|---|---|---|---|---|
| Measure 1 | A constitutional amendment allowing the General Assembly to set salaries for state officials and judges | Passed | 134,724 (53.09%) | 119,060 (46.91%) |
| Measure 2 | A constitutional amendment requiring that voters on issues related to school funding be property tax payers | Failed | 69,005 (30.80%) | 155,018 (69.20%) |
| Measure 3 | A constitutional amendment modifying eminent domain rules | Failed | 32,294 (16.97%) | 157,973 (83.03%) |
| Measure 4 | A constitutional amendment authorizing the state to issue $60,000,000 in bonds for the purpose of constructing new highways (equivalent to $1.125000000×10^{9} in 2025) | Failed | 82,422 (32.16%) | 173,881 (67.84%) |
| Measure 5 | A constitutional amendment creating an elected Board of Education | Failed | 84,416 (34.84%) | 157,889 (65.16%) |

=== 1930 ===
Ballot Measures from 1930
| Measure name | Description | Status | Yes votes | No votes |
|---|---|---|---|---|
| Measure 1 | A measure calling for a constitutional convention | Failed | 93,879 (48.97%) | 97,826 (51.03%) |
| Measure 2 | A constitutional amendment creating an elected Board of Education | Failed | 70,643 (32.05%) | 149,770 (67.95%) |

=== 1932 ===
Ballot Measures from 1932
| Measure name | Description | Status | Yes votes | No votes |
|---|---|---|---|---|
| Measure 1 | A constitutional amendment making some county positions hold a four-year term | Failed | 102,117 (37.57%) | 169,703 (62.43%) |
| Measure 2 | A referendum upholding a law which increased the oleomargarine tax from 10 cents to 15 cents a pound | Failed | 134,313 (38.16%) | 217,671 (61.84%) |
| Measure 3 | An initiative reapportioning seats in the Colorado General Assembly | Passed | 162,871 (53.07%) | 144,037 (46.93%) |
| Measure 4 | A constitutional amendment allowing the General Assembly to create a graduated income tax | Failed | 85,573 (27.49%) | 225,713 (72.51%) |
| Measure 5 | A constitutional amendment allowing the General Assembly to create a limited income tax | Failed | 101,438 (32.11%) | 214,464 (67.89%) |
| Measure 6 | A constitutional amendment limiting fuel taxes | Failed | 124,610 (33.37%) | 248,801 (66.63%) |
| Measure 7 | A constitutional amendment repealing the statewide alcohol prohibition | Passed | 233,311 (56.07%) | 182,771 (43.93%) |

=== 1934 ===
Ballot Measures from 1934
| Measure name | Description | Status | Yes votes | No votes |
|---|---|---|---|---|
| Measure 1 | A constitutional amendment centralizing most authority with the Governor of Colorado | Failed | 102,117 (37.57%) | 169,703 (62.43%) |
| Measure 2 | A constitutional amendment relating to civil service reform | Failed | 60,745 (24.02%) | 192,140 (75.98%) |
| Measure 3 | A constitutional amendment eliminating uniform taxation | Failed | 107,457 (39.98%) | 161,952 (60.11%) |
| Measure 4 | A constitutional amendment granting voters authority to approve new taxes | Failed | 126,649 (45.93%) | 149,098 (54.07%) |
| Measure 5 | A constitutional amendment requiring that taxes related to gasoline and vehicles be allocated exclusively for roads | Passed | 160,482 (54.68%) | 132,994 (45.32%) |
| Measure 6 | A constitutional amendment limiting fuel taxes to 3 cents | Failed | 87,090 (31.69%) | 187,720 (68.31%) |
| Measure 7 | An initiative to requiring chain stores to pay license fees | Passed | 197,144 (55.80%) | 156,147 (44.20%) |

=== 1936 ===
Ballot Measures from 1936
| Measure name | Description | Status | Yes votes | No votes |
|---|---|---|---|---|
| Measure 1 | A constitutional amendment establishing an ownership tax on motor vehicles | Passed | 218,795 (66.90%) | 108,270 (33.10%) |
| Measure 2 | An initiative providing public assistance to sufferers of tuberculosis below a certain income level | Passed | 176,872 (56.98%) | 133,516 (43.02%) |
| Measure 3 | A constitutional amendment limiting tax rates based on the size of a town | Failed | 60,228 (17.52%) | 283,583 (82.48%) |
| Measure 4 | A constitutional amendment allowing the General Assembly to establish an income tax | Failed | 67,155 (20.40%) | 262,022 (79.60%) |
| Measure 5 | A constitutional amendment providing a pension of $45 a month to the elderly (equivalent to $1,044 in 2025) | Passed | 239,289 (64.04%) | 134,377 (35.96%) |
| Measure 6 | An initiative modifying the laws relating to worker's compensation | Passed | 203,195 (63.91%) | 114,733 (36.09%) |
| Measure 7 | A constitutional amendment allowing women to serve on juries | Failed | 129,872 (41.35%) | 184,204 (58.65%) |
| Measure 8 | A constitutional amendment allowing the general assembly to establish a graduated income tax | Passed | 167,268 (51.24%) | 159,143 (48.76%) |
| Measure 9 | A constitutional amendment exempting churches, schools, and cemeteries from property tax | Passed | 227,254 (67.16%) | 111,123 (32.84%) |

=== 1938 ===
Ballot Measures from 1938
| Measure name | Description | Status | Yes votes | No votes |
|---|---|---|---|---|
| Measure 1 | A constitutional amendment giving healthcare practitioners the authority to self-regulate | Failed | 94,846 (23.13%) | 315,174 (76.87%) |
| Measure 2 | A constitutional amendment repealing the $45 a month pension and granting the legislature authority to set pensions | Failed | 157,975 (36.52%) | 274,598 (63.48%) |
| Measure 3 | An initiative repealing the license fees for chain stores | Failed | 167,109 (38.70%) | 264,700 (61.30%) |

=== 1940 ===
Ballot Measures from 1940
| Measure name | Description | Status | Yes votes | No votes |
|---|---|---|---|---|
| Measure 1 | A constitutional amendment establishing property tax on all intangible property | Failed | 50,806 (10.35%) | 440,202 (89.65%) |
| Measure 2 | An initiative to establish a racing commission to oversee horse and dog racing | Failed | 203,195 (42.28%) | 277,392 (57.72%) |
| Measure 3 | A constitutional amendment establishing a game and fish commission | Failed | 196,907 (41.92%) | 272,768 (58.08%) |
| Measure 4 | A constitutional amendment modifying the General Assembly's ability relating to income taxes | Failed | 81,787 (18.26%) | 366,049 (81.74%) |
| Measure 5 | A constitutional amendment lowering the elderly's pension to $30 a month (equivalent to $689 in 2025) | Failed | 138,383 (27.85%) | 358,582 (72.15%) |

=== 1942 ===
Ballot Measures from 1942
| Measure name | Description | Status | Yes votes | No votes |
|---|---|---|---|---|
| Measure 1 | A constitutional amendment limiting the session length of General Assembly meetings | Failed | 72,147 (49.49%) | 73,648 (50.51%) |

=== 1944 ===
Ballot Measures from 1944
| Measure name | Description | Status | Yes votes | No votes |
|---|---|---|---|---|
| Measure 1 | A constitutional amendment allowing women to serve on juries | Passed | 195,793 (60.65%) | 127,057 (39.35%) |
| Measure 2 | A constitutional amendment allowing some foreigners the ability to purchase property | Failed | 173,652 (47.01%) | 195,752 (52.99%) |
| Measure 3 | An initiative appropriating $1,500,000 in funding for old age pensions (equivalent to $27,433,837 in 2025) | Passed | 195,793 (60.65%) | 127,057 (39.35%) |
| Measure 4 | A constitutional amendment granting veterans and their widows preference in the civil service | Passed | 256,563 (70.55%) | 107,100 (29.45%) |

=== 1946 ===
Ballot Measures from 1946
| Measure name | Description | Status | Yes votes | No votes |
|---|---|---|---|---|
| Measure 1 | A constitutional amendment allowing for secret ballots | Passed | 118,470 (56.23%) | 92,203 (43.77%) |
| Measure 2 | A constitutional amendment requiring that any balance in the state pension fund roll-over each year | Failed | 96,787 (36.38%) | 169,243 (63.62%) |

=== 1948 ===
Ballot Measures from 1948
| Measure name | Description | Status | Yes votes | No votes |
|---|---|---|---|---|
| Measure 1 | A constitutional amendment reorganizing the Colorado Department of Education | Passed | 238,100 (65.03%) | 128,054 (34.97%) |
| Measure 2 | An initiative establishing regulations for animal racing | Passed | 238,371 (56.50%) | 183,292 (43.50%) |
| Measure 3 | A constitutional amendment allowing localities to prohibit alcohol | Failed | 120,799 (26.54%) | 334,331 (73.46%) |
| Measure 4 | A constitutional amendment increasing the old age pension to $55 a month (equivalent to $737 in 2025) | Failed | 166,031 (35.96%) | 295,712 (64.04%) |

== 1950–1999 ==
=== 1950 ===
Ballot Measures from 1950
| Measure name | Description | Status | Yes votes | No votes |
|---|---|---|---|---|
| Measure 1 | A constitutional amendment modifying home rule for some localities | Passed | 145,780 (61.39%) | 91,700 (38.61%) |
| Measure 2 | A constitutional amendment modifying some rules relating to the General Assembly | Passed | 134,048 (58.09%) | 96,709 (41.91%) |
| Measure 3 | A constitutional amendment exempting some members of executive departments from the civil service | Failed | 103,848 (33.26%) | 208,408 (66.74%) |

=== 1952 ===
Ballot Measures from 1952
| Measure name | Description | Status | Yes votes | No votes |
|---|---|---|---|---|
| Measure 1 | A constitutional amendment modifying salaries and retirement procedures for judges | Passed | 223,365 (58.28%) | 159,883 (41.72%) |
| Measure 2 | A constitutional amendment modifying public utilities regulations | Failed | 173,652 (46.01%) | 203,732 (53.99%) |
| Measure 3 | A constitutional amendment exempting some forms of property from tax | Failed | 96,584 (25.67%) | 279,682 (74.33%) |
| Measure 4 | A constitutional amendment creating a severance tax on some gasoline products | Failed | 177,125 (35.96%) | 315,392 (64.04%) |
| Measure 5 | An initiative prohibiting firefighters from working more than 60 hours a week | Failed | 169,126 (38.84%) | 266,275 (61.16%) |
| Measure 6 | A constitutional amendment legalizing slot machines | Failed | 152,570 (31.98%) | 324,548 (68.02%) |

=== 1954 ===
Ballot Measures from 1954
| Measure name | Description | Status | Yes votes | No votes |
|---|---|---|---|---|
| Amendment 1 | A constitutional amendment granting the public utilities commission regulatory authority | Passed | 229,175 (64.90%) | 123,932 (35.10%) |
| Amendment 2 | A constitutional amendment excluding the Director of the Water Conservation Board from civil service | Failed | 133,073 (45.44%) | 159,800 (54.56%) |
| Amendment 3 | A constitutional amendment setting elected state officials terms at four years | Failed | 123,112 (44.18%) | 155,539 (55.82%) |
| Amendment 4 | A constitutional amendment requiring income deductions from old age pensions | Failed | 104,079 (31.73%) | 223,965 (68.27%) |
| Amendment 5 | A constitutional amendment reapportioning the General Assembly | Failed | 116,695 (42.30%) | 159,188 (57.70%) |
| Referendum 6 | An initiative allowing for anticipation warrants for highway purposes | Passed | 177,697 (57.26%) | 132,628 (42.74%) |
| Amendment 7 | A constitutional amendment modifying personal property taxation | Failed | 143,486 (49.14%) | 148,517 (50.86%) |
| Amendment 8 | A constitutional amendment setting county officials terms at four years | Passed | 168,055 (52.63%) | 151,271 (47.37%) |

=== 1956 ===
Ballot Measures from 1956
| Measure name | Description | Status | Yes votes | No votes |
|---|---|---|---|---|
| Amendment 1 | A constitutional amendment setting elected state officials terms at four years | Passed | 316,611 (62.22%) | 192,267 (37.78%) |
| Amendment 2 | A constitutional amendment exempting some personal effects from taxation | Passed | 320,134 (61.97%) | 196,423 (38.03%) |
| Amendment 3 | A constitutional amendment modifying the merit system for civil service | Failed | 156,077 (31.82%) | 334,498 (68.18%) |
| Amendment 4 | A constitutional amendment reapportioning the General Assembly | Failed | 158,204 (31.18%) | 349,195 (68.82%) |
| Amendment 5 | A constitutional amendment raising the old age pension to $100 a month and means-testing it (equivalent to $1,184 in 2025) | Passed | 364,961 (65.72%) | 190,366 (34.28%) |

=== 1958 ===
Ballot Measures from 1958
| Measure name | Description | Status | Yes votes | No votes |
|---|---|---|---|---|
| Amendment 1 | A constitutional amendment modifying the civil service to make it more competitive | Failed | 218,426 (48.52%) | 231,725 (51.48%) |
| Amendment 2 | A constitutional amendment modifying the salaries for county and precinct officers | Failed | 146,328 (36.65%) | 252,903 (63.35%) |
| Amendment 3 | A constitutional amendment modifying county governments | Failed | 158,666 (39.64%) | 241,636 (60.36%) |
| Amendment 4 | A constitutional amendment legalizing nonprofit lotteries, bingo games, and raffles | Passed | 244,929 (50.98%) | 235,482 (49.02%) |
| Amendment 5 | A constitutional amendment establishing rules for labor union membership | Failed | 200,319 (38.61%) | 318,480 (61.39%) |

=== 1960 ===
Ballot Measures from 1960
| Measure name | Description | Status | Yes votes | No votes |
|---|---|---|---|---|
| Proposal 1 | A constitutional amendment modifying the civil service | Failed | 214,956 (38.57%) | 342,352 (61.43%) |
| Proposal 2 | A constitutional amendment modifying the election process for county officials | Failed | 231,025 (41.31%) | 328,241 (58.69%) |
| Proposal 3 | A constitutional amendment creating a department of wildlife conservation | Failed | 190,366 (31.24%) | 419,048 (68.76%) |
| Proposal 4 | An initiative establishing daylight saving time | Failed | 280,115 (45.46%) | 336,033 (54.54%) |
| Proposal 5 | A constitutional amendment imposing a sales tax on all items except drugs and food | Failed | 200,566 (33.20%) | 403,470 (66.80%) |
| Proposal 7 | An initiative exempting some governor appointees from civil service | Failed | 170,736 (28.40%) | 430,394 (71.60%) |

=== 1962 ===
Ballot Measures from 1962
| Measure name | Description | Status | Yes votes | No votes |
|---|---|---|---|---|
| Proposal 1 | A constitutional amendment reorganizing the judicial department | Passed | 303,740 (64.24%) | 169,052 (35.76%) |
| Proposal 2 | A constitutional amendment modifying Denver city and county officers | Failed | 157,249 (38.20%) | 254,354 (61.80%) |
| Proposal 3 | A constitutional amendment redefining "income" for state purposes | Passed | 231,784 (53.46%) | 201,795 (46.54%) |
| Proposal 4 | A constitutional amendment establishing minimum voter qualifications | Passed | 303,942 (68.88%) | 137,323 (31.12%) |
| Proposal 5 | A constitutional amendment modifying property tax assessment procedures | Passed | 215,413 (50.34%) | 212,477 (49.66%) |
| Proposal 6 | A constitutional amendment changing term lengths for county officials | Failed | 207,442 (49.83%) | 208,867 (50.17%) |
| Proposal 7 | A constitutional amendment reapportioning the General Assembly | Passed | 305,700 (63.90%) | 172,725 (36.10%) |
| Proposal 8 | A constitutional amendment creating a reapportionment commission | Failed | 149,822 (32.46%) | 311,749 (67.54%) |

=== 1964 ===
Ballot Measures from 1964
| Measure name | Description | Status | Yes votes | No votes |
|---|---|---|---|---|
| Proposal 1 | A constitutional amendment creating a state auditor under the legislature | Passed | 304,066 (63.71%) | 173,221 (36.29%) |
| Proposal 2 | A constitutional amendment allowing voters to abolish their County Superintendent's office | Passed | 308,049 (63.38%) | 177,967 (36.62%) |

=== 1966 ===
Ballot Measures from 1966
| Measure name | Description | Status | Yes votes | No votes |
|---|---|---|---|---|
| Amendment 1 | A constitutional amendment limiting the number of executive departments at the state level to no more than 20 | Passed | 369,366 (69.51%) | 162,038 (30.49%) |
| Amendment 2 | A constitutional amendment creating an ownership tax on motor vehicles | Passed | 318,102 (60.10%) | 211,177 (39.90%) |
| Amendment 3 | A constitutional amendment creating the Colorado Commission on Judicial Qualifications | Passed | 293,771 (52.90%) | 261,558 (47.10%) |
| Amendment 4 | A constitutional amendment establishing a 35-member Senate and a 65-member House of Representatives | Passed | 374,884 (70.34%) | 158,067 (29.66%) |
| Amendment 5 | A constitutional amendment establishing a limit on property tax increases | Failed | 178,245 (31.55%) | 386,650 (68.45%) |
| Referred Law 1 | An initiative establishing daylight saving time | Passed | 346,274 (57.26%) | 258,490 (42.74%) |
| Refereed Law 2 | An initiative abolishing the death penalty | Failed | 193,245 (33.15%) | 389,707 (66.85%) |

=== 1968 ===
Ballot Measures from 1968
| Measure name | Description | Status | Yes votes | No votes |
|---|---|---|---|---|
| Amendment 1 | A constitutional amendment requiring the Governor and Lieutenant Governor be elected jointly | Passed | 428,522 (67.73%) | 204,186 (32.27%) |
| Amendment 2 | A constitutional amendment exempting some property from taxation | Failed | 284,404 (47.93%) | 308,915 (52.07%) |
| Amendment 3 | A constitutional amendment modifying the salaries of county officials | Passed | 307,356 (51.50%) | 288,873 (48.50%) |

=== 1970 ===
Ballot Measures from 1970
| Measure name | Description | Status | Yes votes | No votes |
|---|---|---|---|---|
| Amendment 1 | A constitutional amendment exempting department heads from civil service | Passed | 293,621 (57.21%) | 219,639 (42.89%) |
| Amendment 2 | A constitutional amendment modifying the merit system for state employment | Passed | 346,663 (66.40%) | 175,076 (33.60%) |
| Amendment 3 | A constitutional amendment allowing counties to have home rule | Passed | 325,512 (65.56%) | 170,986 (34.44%) |
| Amendment 4 | A constitutional amendment reducing the age and residency requirements for voting | Failed | 240,622 (45.19%) | 291,858 (54.81%) |
| Amendment 5 | A constitutional amendment modifying residency requirements for voting | Passed | 336,977 (64.60%) | 184,694 (35.40%) |

=== 1972 ===
Ballot Measures from 1972
| Measure name | Description | Status | Yes votes | No votes |
|---|---|---|---|---|
| Measure 1 | An initiative to legalize sweepstakes races | Failed | 408,704 (49.49%) | 417,149 (50.51%) |
| Measure 2 | A constitutional amendment creating a state student loan program | Passed | 443,660 (54.13%) | 375,948 (45.87%) |
| Measure 3 | A constitutional amendment codifying a right to gender equality | Passed | 531,415 (64.28%) | 295,254 (35.72%) |
| Measure 4 | A constitutional amendment modifying the structure of the University of Colorado's Board of Regents | Passed | 418,825 (52.00%) | 386,645 (48.00%) |
| Measure 5 | A constitutional amendment allowing the salaries of elected officials to change while they are in office | Failed | 233,678 (29.04%) | 571,083 (70.96%) |
| Measure 6 | A constitutional amendment allowing for a private lottery hosted by the United States Sweepstakes Corporation | Failed | 161,281 (19.93%) | 647,817 (80.06%) |
| Measure 7 | A constitutional amendment limiting property taxes | Failed | 192,913 (23.53%) | 627,007 (76.47%) |
| Measure 8 | A constitutional amendment preventing the state from instituting new taxes or loaning money for the 1976 Winter Olympics | Passed | 514,228 (59.44%) | 350,964 (40.56%) |
| Measure 9 | An initiative instituting new transparency requirements for public officials | Passed | 491,073 (60.11%) | 325,819 (39.89%) |
| Measure 10 | An initiative creating a regulatory agency to govern utility rates | Failed | 350,264 (42.80%) | 468,154 (57.20%) |
| Measure 11 | An initiative requiring drivers to hold vehicle insurance | Failed | 208,155 (25.89%) | 595,887 (74.11%) |
| Measure 12 | A constitutional amendment limiting property taxes | Failed | 167,882 (21.09%) | 628,201 (78.91%) |

=== 1974 ===
Ballot Measures from 1974
| Measure name | Description | Status | Yes votes | No votes |
|---|---|---|---|---|
| Amendment 1 | A constitutional amendment requiring county territory changes be approved by voters | Passed | 409,174 (58.35%) | 292,040 (41.65%) |
| Amendment 2 | An initiative imposing the death penalty on people convicted of class 1 felonies | Passed | 451,403 (61.15%) | 286,805 (38.85%) |
| Amendment 3 | A constitutional amendment requiring regular reports by the State Treasurer | Passed | 425,505 (63.26%) | 247,141 (36.74%) |
| Amendment 4 | A constitutional amendment allowing localities to invest in energy sector corporations | Passed | 481,513 (82.75%) | 100,360 (17.25%) |
| Amendment 5 | A constitutional amendment creating a commission to govern Denver's growth | Passed | 397,442 (61.17%) | 252,256 (38.83%) |
| Amendment 6 | A constitutional amendment modifying the functions of the executive and legislative departments | Passed | 386,284 (59.96%) | 257,967 (40.04%) |
| Amendment 7 | A constitutional amendment modifying the aviation fuel tax | Passed | 375,390 (56.13%) | 293,430 (43.87%) |
| Amendment 8 | A constitutional amendment prohibiting forced busing | Passed | 485,536 (68.74%) | 220,842 (31.26%) |
| Amendment 9 | A constitutional amendment creating the Colorado Reapportionment Commission | Passed | 386,725 (60.20%) | 255,725 (39.80%) |
| Amendment 10 | A constitutional amendment requiring voter approval before nuclear detonations | Passed | 399,818 (57.85%) | 291,284 (42.15%) |

=== 1976 ===
Ballot Measures from 1976
| Measure name | Description | Status | Yes votes | No votes |
|---|---|---|---|---|
| Measure 1 | An initiative authorizing some sweepstakes races | Passed | 522,068 (50.53%) | 511,135 (49.47%) |
| Measure 2 | A constitutional amendment modifying the way motor vehicles are categorized for tax purposes | Passed | 627,562 (61.75%) | 388,666 (38.25%) |
| Measure 3 | A constitutional amendment requiring a two-thirds vote in the legislature before the construction of a nuclear power plant | Failed | 305,142 (29.34%) | 734,843 (70.66%) |
| Measure 4 | A constitutional amendment exempting some state government officials from the standard personnel system | Failed | 237,853 (23.63%) | 768,687 (76.37%) |
| Measure 5 | A constitutional amendment allowing county commissioners to modify other elected officials' salaries | Failed | 376,386 (37.43%) | 629,136 (62.57%) |
| Measure 6 | A constitutional amendment revoking the right to gender equality | Failed | 401,943 (38.99%) | 629,060 (61.01%) |
| Measure 7 | An initiative exempting food from sales tax | Failed | 406,311 (38.87%) | 639,058 (61.13%) |
| Measure 8 | An initiative requiring the recycling of beverage containers | Failed | 346,335 (33.03%) | 702,292 (66.97%) |
| Measure 9 | An initiative creating a department to represent public utility customers in government meetings | Failed | 304,594 (39.97%) | 711,627 (70.03%) |
| Measure 10 | A constitutional amendment requiring voter approval of all taxes | Failed | 259,201 (25.25%) | 767,157 (74.75%) |

=== 1978 ===
Ballot Measures from 1978
| Measure name | Description | Status | Yes votes | No votes |
|---|---|---|---|---|
| Amendment 1 | A constitutional amendment clarifying the procedure for replacing county commissioners who resign during their term | Passed | 442,071 (66.13%) | 226,432 (33.87%) |
| Amendment 2 | A constitutional amendment limiting state spending | Failed | 295,616 (41.27%) | 420,759 (58.73%) |

=== 1980 ===
Ballot Measures from 1980
| Measure name | Description | Status | Yes votes | No votes |
|---|---|---|---|---|
| Amendment 1 | A constitutional amendment requiring that measure petition signers also be registered voters | Passed | 638,731 (60.14%) | 423,322 (39.86%) |
| Amendment 2 | A constitutional amendment creating a state-run lottery | Passed | 660,213 (59.83%) | 443,289 (40.17%) |
| Amendment 3 | A constitutional amendment allowing towns and cities to annex unincorporated areas with voter approval | Passed | 601,302 (56.65%) | 460,084 (34.35%) |
| Amendment 4 | A constitutional amendment relating to real estate sales | Failed | 381,821 (33.87%) | 745,625 (66.13%) |
| Amendment 5 | A constitutional amendment allowing banks to open additional branches | Failed | 292,323 (25.58%) | 850,454 (74.42%) |
| Amendment 6 | A constitutional amendment restructuring the regional transportation district's board | Passed | 570,049 (56.17%) | 444,902 (43.83%) |

=== 1982 ===
Ballot Measures from 1982
| Measure name | Description | Status | Yes votes | No votes |
|---|---|---|---|---|
| Amendment 1 | A constitutional amendment modifying property tax assessments | Passed | 551,334 (65.49%) | 290,590 (34.51%) |
| Amendment 2 | A constitutional amendment allowing bail to be denied to people accused of capital offenses | Passed | 737,813 (82.52%) | 156,336 (17.48%) |
| Amendment 3 | A constitutional amendment establishing a system for judicial discipline | Passed | 659,905 (77.33%) | 193,425 (22.67%) |
| Amendment 4 | A constitutional amendment modifying some legislative procedures | Passed | 442,601 (54.27%) | 372,897 (45.73%) |
| Amendment 5 | An initiative requiring beverage containers to have a minimum refund value | Failed | 242,653 (25.51%) | 708,564 (75.45%) |
| Amendment 6 | A constitutional amendment ending nuclear weapons production | Failed | 325,985 (36.60%) | 564,606 (63.40%) |
| Amendment 7 | An initiative allowing grocery stores to sell wines with alcohol contents below 14% | Failed | 333,467 (35.00%) | 620,190 (65.00%) |

=== 1984 ===
Ballot Measures from 1984
| Measure name | Description | Status | Yes votes | No votes |
|---|---|---|---|---|
| Amendment 1 | A constitutional amendment creating the office of the Commissioner of Insurance | Passed | 641,587 (58.81%) | 449,362 (41.19%) |
| Amendment 2 | A constitutional amendment requiring voter registration for all election types | Passed | 811,130 (72.73%) | 304,208 (27.27%) |
| Amendment 3 | A constitutional amendment prohibiting the use of state funds for abortion | Passed | 627,343 (50.39%) | 617,637 (49.61%) |
| Amendment 4 | An initiative allowing voter registration alongside driver's license applications | Passed | 705,725 (61.18%) | 447,803 (38.82%) |
| Amendment 5 | A constitutional amendment allowing some forms of casino gambling | Failed | 406,989 (33.18%) | 819,533 (66.82%) |

=== 1986 ===
Ballot Measures from 1986
| Measure name | Description | Status | Yes votes | No votes |
|---|---|---|---|---|
| Amendment 1 | A constitutional amendment modifying the merit system for state employment | Failed | 461,004 (48.57%) | 488,226 (51.43%) |
| Amendment 2 | A constitutional amendment allowing county commissioners to modify other elected officials salaries | Failed | 406,960 (45.24%) | 492,511 (54.76%) |
| Amendment 3 | A constitutional amendment requiring that home rule municipalities abide by an initiative and referendum system | Passed | 455,053 (53.42%) | 396,738 (46.58%) |
| Amendment 4 | A constitutional amendment preventing new taxes without voter approval | Failed | 375,097 (37.50%) | 625,158 (62.50%) |

=== 1988 ===
Ballot Measures from 1988
| Measure name | Description | Status | Yes votes | No votes |
|---|---|---|---|---|
| Amendment 1 | A constitutional amendment making English the official state language | Passed | 829,617 (61.15%) | 527,053 (38.85%) |
| Amendment 2 | A constitutional amendment modifying expenses reimbursements | Passed | 645,002 (53.93%) | 551,118 (46.07%) |
| Amendment 3 | A constitutional amendment restricting General Assembly sessions to no more than 120 days | Passed | 641,363 (52.33%) | 584,359 (47.77%) |
| Amendment 4 | A constitutional amendment creating an eight-hour workday, modifying age qualifications to vote, and repealing some obsolete provisions | Passed | 799,250 (67.21%) | 389,906 (32.79%) |
| Amendment 5 | A constitutional amendment exempting some forms of property from taxation | Passed | 624,021 (51.90%) | 578,295 (48.10%) |
| Amendment 6 | A constitutional amendment requiring voter approval for new taxes | Failed | 567,884 (42.19%) | 778,075 (57.81%) |
| Amendment 7 | A constitutional amendment allowing state funds to be used for abortion | Failed | 534,070 (39.76%) | 809,078 (60.24%) |
| Amendment 8 | A constitutional amendment modifying some General Assembly procedures | Passed | 852,448 (71.96%) | 332,159 (28.04%) |

=== 1990 ===
Ballot Measures from 1990
| Measure name | Description | Status | Yes votes | No votes |
|---|---|---|---|---|
| Amendment 1 | A constitutional amendment requiring voter approval for some tax increases | Failed | 494,934 (48.93%) | 516,534 (51.07%) |
| Amendment 2 | A referendum modifying the presidential primary system | Passed | 582,835 (61.16%) | 370,166 (38.84%) |
| Amendment 3 | A constitutional amendment repealing some obsolete provisions | Passed | 717,544 (77.84%) | 204,294 (22.16%) |
| Amendment 4 | A constitutional amendment allowing limited gambling in Black Hawk, Central, and Cripple Creek cities | Passed | 574,620 (57.31%) | 428,096 (42.39%) |
| Amendment 5 | A constitutional amendment instituting term limits for most statewide elected officials | Passed | 708,975 (70.99%) | 289,664 (29.01%) |

=== 1992 ===
Ballot Measures from 1992
| Measure name | Description | Status | Yes votes | No votes |
|---|---|---|---|---|
| Amendment 1 | A constitutional amendment establishing a Taxpayer Bill of Rights (TABOR) | Passed | 812,308 (53.68%) | 700,906 (46.32%) |
| Amendment 2 | A constitutional amendment prohibiting local governments for granted protected status to sexual orientation | Passed | 813,966 (53.41%) | 710,151 (46.59%) |
| Amendment 3 | A constitutional amendment authorizing some forms of gambling in a variety of cities and counties | Failed | 448,779 (29.74%) | 1,060,168 (70.26%) |
| Amendment 4 | A constitutional amendment authorizing some forms of gambling in a variety of cities and counties | Failed | 414,699 (27.61%) | 1,087,136 (72.39%) |
| Amendment 5 | A constitutional amendment authorizing some forms of gambling in Parachute | Failed | 414,489 (27.59%) | 1,087,713 (72.41%) |
| Amendment 6 | An initiative requiring state-wide educational standards, testing, and implementing a wide variety of school funding reforms | Failed | 693,231 (45.61%) | 826,787 (54.39%) |
| Amendment 7 | A constitutional amendment creating a voucher program for schools | Failed | 503,162 (33.21%) | 1,011,901 (55.79%) |
| Amendment 8 | A constitutional amendment creating the Great Outdoors Colorado Program | Passed | 876,424 (58.20%) | 629,490 (41.80%) |
| Amendment 9 | A constitutional amendment allowing limited gambling in the Central Platte Valley | Failed | 292,961 (19.62%) | 1,200,336 (80.38%) |
| Amendment 10 | An initiative banning the use of bait and dogs in black bear hunting | Passed | 1,054,032 (69.70%) | 458,260 (30.30%) |
| Referendum A | A constitutional amendment establishing victim rights | Passed | 1,139,427 (80.18%) | 281,731 (19.82%) |
| Referendum B | A constitutional amendment repealing some obsolete provisions | Passed | 1,081,463 (78.02%) | 304,718 (21.98%) |
| Referendum C | A constitutional amendment allowing for limited gambling in localities with voter approval | Passed | 1,075,649 (76.01%) | 339,521 (23.99%) |

=== 1993 ===
Ballot Measures from 1993
| Measure name | Description | Status | Yes votes | No votes |
|---|---|---|---|---|
| Referendum A | An initiative establishing a sales tax on tourist-related items for the purpose of funding tourism marketing | Failed | 274,989 (44.82%) | 338,546 (55.18%) |

=== 1994 ===
Ballot Measures from 1994
| Measure name | Description | Status | Yes votes | No votes |
|---|---|---|---|---|
| Amendment 1 | A constitutional amendment increasing the cigarette tax rate to 50% | Failed | 429,847 (38.53%) | 685,860 (61.47%) |
| Amendment 11 | A constitutional amendment increasing the benefits of worker's compensation insurance | Failed | 369,741 (33.59%) | 730,963 (66.41%) |
| Amendment 12 | A constitutional amendment substantially modifying campaign contribution rules | Failed | 246,723 (22.53%) | 848,140 (77.47%) |
| Amendment 13 | A constitutional amendment allowing airports to host slot machines and allowing limited gambling in Manitou Springs | Failed | 90,936 (8.28%) | 1,007,557 (91.72%) |
| Amendment 15 | A constitutional amendment requiring that at least 60% of candidate contributions come from individuals rather than organizations | Failed | 508,029 (46.35%) | 588,072 (53.65%) |
| Amendment 16 | A constitutional amendment preventing the state judiciary from restricting freedom of speech past existing federal precedent | Failed | 404,156 (36.73%) | 696,040 (63.27%) |
| Amendment 17 | A constitutional amendment placing term limits on a variety of public offices | Passed | 554,238 (51.05%) | 531,521 (48.95%) |
| Amendment 18 | A constitutional amendment relating to financial responsibility for medical assistance | Failed | 334,029 (31.85%) | 714,653 (68.15%) |
| Referendum A | A constitutional amendment requiring that ballot measures placed via petition be confined to a single subject | Passed | 687,527 (65.68%) | 359,298 (34.32%) |
| Referendum B | A constitutional amendment requiring the publication of a nonpartisan voter information pamphlet every election | Passed | 529,749 (50.44%) | 520,438 (49.56%) |
| Referendum C | A constitutional amendment denying bail to people accused of violent felonies | Passed | 822,632 (76.93%) | 246,726 (23.07%) |

=== 1995 ===
Ballot Measures from 1995
| Measure name | Description | Status | Yes votes | No votes |
|---|---|---|---|---|
| Referendum A | A referendum allowing the state to incur debt for the purposes of funding prisons | Failed | 291,736 (45.11%) | 355,031 (54.89%) |

=== 1996 ===
Ballot Measures from 1996
| Measure name | Description | Status | Yes votes | No votes |
|---|---|---|---|---|
| Amendment 11 | A constitutional amendment eliminating many property tax exemptions | Failed | 242,543 (16.68%) | 1,211,637 (83.32%) |
| Amendment 12 | A constitutional amendment setting term limits for many public offices and proposing a federal amendment to the same effect | Passed | 768,257 (54.01%) | 654,124 (45.99%) |
| Amendment 13 | A constitutional amendment modifying the ballot measure process | Failed | 435,995 (31.07%) | 967,266 (68.93%) |
| Amendment 14 | A constitutional amendment prohibiting leghold traps, body-gripping traps, poisons, and snares for hunting | Passed | 752,413 (52.10%) | 691,733 (47.90%) |
| Amendment 15 | An initiative limiting political campaign contributions | Passed | 928,148 (65.79%) | 482,551 (34.21%) |
| Amendment 16 | A constitutional amendment modifying some rules relating to state lands held in trust | Passed | 708,502 (51.92%) | 656,095 (48.08%) |
| Amendment 17 | A constitutional amendment specifying that parents have the right to control their children's upbringing, education, values, and discipline | Failed | 615,202 (42.35%) | 837,606 (57.65%) |
| Amendment 18 | A constitutional amendment allowing some forms of gambling in Trinidad | Failed | 440,173 (31.46%) | 958,991 (68.54%) |
| Referendum A | A constitutional amendment requiring that proposed constitutional amendments reach a 60% vote threshold to pass | Failed | 544,543 (40.89%) | 787,134 (59.11%) |
| Referendum B | A constitutional amendment lengthening the time between the mailing of voter information pamphlets and ballots | Passed | 739,435 (54.87%) | 608,219 (45.13%) |
| Referendum C | A constitutional amendment authorizing the General Assembly to regulate county sheriff's offices | Passed | 754,339 (56.10%) | 590,402 (43.90%) |
| Referendum D | A constitutional amendment modifying unemployment compensation insurance | Failed | 376,860 (29.32%) | 908,476 (70.68%) |

=== 1997 ===
Ballot Measures from 1997
| Measure name | Description | Status | Yes votes | No votes |
|---|---|---|---|---|
| Amendment 1 | A constitutional amendment raising the fuel tax and vehicle registration fees for the purpose of funding the Transportation Department | Failed | 109,663 (15.79%) | 585,055 (84.21%) |

=== 1998 ===
Ballot Measures from 1998
| Measure name | Description | Status | Yes votes | No votes |
|---|---|---|---|---|
| Amendment 11 | A constitutional amendment prohibiting partial-birth abortions | Failed | 617,977 (48.52%) | 655,723 (51.48%) |
| Amendment 12 | An initiative requiring parental notification before an abortion is performed on an emancipated minor | Passed | 707,021 (54.87%) | 581,481 (45.13%) |
| Amendment 13 | A constitutional amendment requiring uniform application of livestock laws | Failed | 475,664 (38.70%) | 753,509 (61.30%) |
| Amendment 14 | An initiative increasing regulations of commercial hog farms | Passed | 790,825 (64.21%) | 440,766 (35.79%) |
| Amendment 15 | An initiative requiring that water flow meters in the San Luis Valley be certified by the state engineer | Failed | 292,977 (23.83%) | 936,698 (76.17%) |
| Amendment 16 | A constitutional amendment instituting fees on water pumped from state lands in the Rio Grande Water Conservation District | Failed | 297,872 (24.23%) | 931,566 (75.77%) |
| Amendment 17 | A constitutional amendment granting a tax credit to the parents of schoolchildren | Failed | 515,942 (39.72%) | 782,982 (60.28%) |
| Amendment 18 | A constitutional amendment allowing candidates for public office to submit declarations of voluntary term limits | Passed | 613,557 (50.41%) | 603,651 (49.59%) |
| Referendum A | A constitutional amendment relating to healthcare | Failed | 505,903 (45.32%) | 610,449 (54.68%) |
| Referendum B | An initiative allowing the state to hold up to $200,000,000 in excess tax revenue for the purpose of funding school construction and transportation (equivalent to $395,059,208 in 2025) | Failed | 477,504 (38.41%) | 765,654 (61.59%) |
| Referendum C | A constitutional amendment creating the city and county of Broomfield | Passed | 670,781 (61.29%) | 423,603 (38.71%) |

=== 1999 ===
Ballot Measures from 1999
| Measure name | Description | Status | Yes votes | No votes |
|---|---|---|---|---|
| Referendum A | A referendum allowing the state to take on additional debt for the purpose of funding transportation projects | Passed | 477,982 (61.68%) | 296,971 (38.32%) |

== 2000–present ==
=== 2000 ===
Ballot Measures from 2000
| Measure name | Description | Status | Yes votes | No votes |
|---|---|---|---|---|
| Amendment 20 | A constitutional amendment legalizing medical marijuana | Passed | 915,527 (53.53%) | 786,983 (46.47%) |
| Amendment 21 | A constitutional amendment introducing small tax cuts | Failed | 569,788 (33.98%) | 1,107,155 (66.02%) |
| Amendment 22 | An initiative requiring background checks on gun purchases at gun shows | Passed | 1,197,593 (70.05%) | 512,084 (29.95%) |
| Amendment 23 | A constitutional amendment modifying public school funding | Passed | 882,628 (52.71%) | 791,934 (47.29%) |
| Amendment 24 | A constitutional amendment requiring voter approval for local government development plans | Failed | 511,885 (30.11%) | 1,888,138 (69.89%) |
| Amendment 25 | A constitutional amendment requiring a 24-hour waiting period before abortions | Failed | 664,420 (39.44%) | 1,020,029 (60.56%) |
| Referendum A | A constitutional amendment establishing a homestead tax exemption for senior citizens | Passed | 843,620 (54.74%) | 697,398 (45.26%) |
| Referendum B | A constitutional amendment modifying the timeframe for adoption of a redistricting plan for the General Assembly | Passed | 852,098 (60.48%) | 556,769 (39.52%) |
| Referendum C | A constitutional amendment modifying the selection process for county surveyors | Failed | 661,704 (45.45%) | 794,310 (54.55%) |
| Referendum D | A constitutional amendment removing some outdated provisions | Passed | 1,063,345 (71.56%) | 422,629 (28.44%) |
| Referendum E | An initiative allowing Colorado to enter multi-state lotteries | Passed | 836,390 (51.64%) | 783,275 (48.36%) |
| Referendum F | An initiative allowing the state to utilize excess state revenues for the purpose of funding school performance grants | Failed | 697,673 (44.11%) | 887,947 (55.89%) |

=== 2001 ===
Ballot Measures from 2001
| Measure name | Description | Status | Yes votes | No votes |
|---|---|---|---|---|
| Amendment 26 | An initiative allowing the state to spend $50,000,000 for the purpose of improving Interstate 70 (equivalent to $90,913,362 in 2025) | Failed | 283,184 (34.10%) | 547,213 (65.90%) |
| Referendum A | An initiative increasing the outdoor recreation trust fund by $115,000,000 (equivalent to $209,100,733 in 2025) | Passed | 478,501 (57.58%) | 352,585 (42.42%) |

=== 2002 ===
Ballot Measures from 2002
| Measure name | Description | Status | Yes votes | No votes |
|---|---|---|---|---|
| Amendment 27 | A constitutional amendment limiting corporation and labor union contributions to political campaigns | Passed | 890,390 (66.50%) | 448,599 (33.50%) |
| Amendment 28 | An initiative requiring voting by mail | Failed | 557,573 (42.41%) | 757,299 (57.59%) |
| Amendment 29 | An initiative substantially modifying the candidate selection process for primary elections | Failed | 509,109 (39.84%) | 768,683 (60.14%) |
| Amendment 30 | A constitutional amendment allowing same-day voter registration | Failed | 530,442 (39.25%) | 821,050 (60.75%) |
| Amendment 31 | A constitutional amendment prohibiting bilingual education in most circumstances | Failed | 608,264 (43.78%) | 781,016 (56.22%) |
| Referendum A | A constitutional amendment eliminating term limits for district attorneys | Failed | 461,848 (35.27%) | 847,602 (64.73%) |
| Referendum B | A constitutional amendment allowing localities to co-own healthcare facilities with private companies | Failed | 510,209 (40.76%) | 741,568 (59.24%) |
| Referendum C | A constitutional amendment allowing the General Assembly to regulate the position of county coroner | Passed | 900,611 (70.92%) | 369,351 (29.08%) |
| Referendum D | A constitutional amendment removing some obsolete provisions | Passed | 899,914 (71.89%) | 351,886 (28.11%) |
| Referendum E | A referendum establishing March 31 as "Cesar Chavez Day" | Failed | 275,947 (20.61%) | 1,062,780 (79.39%) |

=== 2003 ===
Ballot Measures from 2003
| Measure name | Description | Status | Yes votes | No votes |
|---|---|---|---|---|
| Amendment 32 | A constitutional amendment modifying property tax assessment | Failed | 203,449 (22.45%) | 702,829 (77.55%) |
| Amendment 33 | A constitutional amendment allowing some limited forms of gambling | Failed | 180,959 (19.09%) | 766,893 (80.91%) |
| Referendum A | An referendum allowing the state to borrow up to $2,000,000,000 to fund water projects (equivalent to $3.500361795×10^{9} in 2025) | Failed | 307,412 (32.87%) | 627,716 (67.13%) |

=== 2004 ===
Ballot Measures from 2004
| Measure name | Description | Status | Yes votes | No votes |
|---|---|---|---|---|
| Amendment 34 | A constitutional amendment prohibiting laws which would limit property owner's ability to recover damages from construction projects | Failed | 469,566 (23.45%) | 1,533,002 (76.55%) |
| Amendment 35 | A constitutional amendment raising the tobacco tax for the purpose of funding educational and preventive health programs | Passed | 1,258,086 (61.38%) | 791,627 (38.62%) |
| Amendment 36 | A constitutional amendment allowing Colorado's electoral votes to be distributed proportionally | Failed | 696,770 (34.78%) | 1,306,834 (65.22%) |
| Amendment 37 | An initiative requiring that a certain percentage of electricity be generated from renewable sources | Passed | 1,066,023 (53.61%) | 922,577 (46.39%) |
| Referendum A | A constitutional amendment substantially modifying the state civil service system | Failed | 696,007 (39.19%) | 1,080,136 (60.81%) |
| Referendum B | A constitutional amendment removing some obsolete provisions relating to education | Passed | 1,247,998 (69.00%) | 560,811 (31.00%) |

=== 2005 ===
Ballot Measures from 2005
| Measure name | Description | Status | Yes votes | No votes |
|---|---|---|---|---|
| Referendum C | An initiative allowing the state to spend money collected over the TABOR limit on health care, public education, transportation, and fire and police projects | Passed | 600,222 (52.06%) | 552,662 (47.94%) |
| Referendum D | An initiative allowing the state to borrow up to $2,000,720,000 (equivalent to $3.298171068×10^{9} in 2025) | Failed | 567,540 (49.38%) | 581,751 (50.62%) |

=== 2006 ===
Ballot Measures from 2006
| Measure name | Description | Status | Yes votes | No votes |
|---|---|---|---|---|
| Amendment 38 | A constitutional amendment expanding the ability for citizens to place measures on the ballot | Failed | 456,468 (30.67%) | 1,027,550 (69.24%) |
| Amendment 39 | A constitutional amendment requiring that 65% of school district budgets be allocated towards classroom instruction | Failed | 569,483 (37.61%) | 944,735 (62.39%) |
| Amendment 40 | A constitutional amendment introducing term limits for judges in the Colorado Supreme Court and Colorado Court of Appeals | Failed | 648,199 (42.91%) | 862,349 (57.09%) |
| Amendment 41 | A constitutional amendment prohibiting elected officials and their family members from accepting gifts and restricting former elected official's abilities to become lobbyists | Passed | 938,888 (62.57%) | 561,646 (37.43%) |
| Amendment 42 | A constitutional amendment increasing the minimum wage and tying it to inflation | Passed | 823,526 (53.30%) | 721,530 (46.70%) |
| Amendment 43 | A constitutional amendment prohibiting same-sex marriages | Passed (Note: Repealed by Amendment J in 2024) | 855,126 (55.02%) | 699,030 (44.98%) |
| Amendment 44 | An initiative legalizing the possession of marijuana in small amounts | Failed | 636,938 (41.08%) | 913,411 (58.92%) |
| Referendum E | A constitutional amendment providing a property tax exemption to some disabled veterans | Passed | 1,195,907 (79.24%) | 313,292 (20.76%) |
| Referendum F | A constitutional amendment removing some deadlines relating to recall elections | Failed | 626,015 (44.68%) | 775,207 (55.32%) |
| Referendum G | A constitutional amendment eliminating some obsolete provisions | Passed | 1,092,293 (76.08%) | 343,495 (23.92%) |
| Referendum H | An initiative relating to the income tax deduction limit | Passed | 744,475 (50.74%) | 722,651 (49.26%) |
| Referendum I | An initiative granting same-sex couples the same rights as other domestic partnerships | Failed | 734,385 (47.65%) | 806,717 (52.35%) |
| Referendum J | An initiative requiring that school districts spend at least 65% of their budget on student achievement-related services | Failed | 620,790 (41.53%) | 874,151 (58.47%) |
| Referendum K | An initiative requiring the Attorney General of Colorado to engage in a lawsuit against the United States to force the enforcement of existing immigration laws | Passed | 830,628 (55.72%) | 660,012 (44.28%) |

=== 2008 ===
Ballot Measures from 2008
| Measure name | Description | Status | Yes votes | No votes |
|---|---|---|---|---|
| Amendment 46 | A constitutional amendment prohibiting discrimination and preferential treatment in public employment, education, and contracting | Failed | 1,102,046 (49.19%) | 1,138,134 (50.81%) |
| Amendment 47 | A constitutional amendment prohibition union contracts which require employees to pay fees to stay employed | Failed | 1,003,056 (43.89%) | 1,282,501 (56.11%) |
| Amendment 48 | A constitutional amendment defining personhood as beginning at conception | Failed | 618,779 (26.79%) | 1,691,237 (73.21%) |
| Amendment 49 | A constitutional amendment prohibiting public employers from using payroll deductions to benefit private organizations | Failed | 882,428 (39.24%) | 1,366,620 (60.76%) |
| Amendment 50 | A constitutional amendment allowing some forms of gambling in Central, Black Hawk, and Cripple Creek cities | Passed | 1,330,566 (58.70%) | 936,254 (41.30%) |
| Amendment 51 | A constitutional amendment increasing the sales tax for the purpose of funding services for the developmentally disabled | Failed | 853,211 (37.63%) | 1,414,065 (62.37%) |
| Amendment 52 | A constitutional amendment creating a trust fund for highway development | Failed | 790,124 (35.78%) | 1,418,009 (64.22%) |
| Amendment 54 | A constitutional amendment limiting campaign contributions from government contract holders | Passed | 1,130,098 (51.21%) | 1,076,694 (48.79%) |
| Amendment 58 | An initiative modifying the severance tax | Failed | 944,191 (41.95%) | 1,306,782 (58.05%) |
| Amendment 59 | A constitutional amendment relating to education funding and rebates | Failed | 1,010,409 (45.69%) | 1,201,220 (54.31%) |
| Referendum L | A constitutional amendment lowering the age requirement to serve as a General Assembly member to 21 | Failed | 1,010,896 (46.50%) | 1,162,296 (53.50%) |
| Referendum M | A constitutional amendment eliminating some obsolete provisions relating to land value increases | Passed | 1,307,770 (62.26%) | 792,678 (37.74%) |
| Referendum N | A constitutional amendment eliminating some obsolete provisions relating to alcohol | Passed | 1,449,383 (68.75%) | 658,684 (31.25%) |
| Referendum O | A constitutional amendment modifying the requirements to place ballot measures on the ballot | Failed | 1,004,925 (47.50%) | 1,110,877 (52.50%) |

=== 2010 ===
Ballot Measures from 2010
| Measure name | Description | Status | Yes votes | No votes |
|---|---|---|---|---|
| Amendment P | A constitutional amendment transferring regulatory power over gambling from the Department of State to the Department of Revenue | Failed | 611,664 (37.67%) | 1,012,193 (62.33%) |
| Amendment Q | A constitutional amendment establishing some government continuity procedures | Passed | 944,446 (57.52%) | 697,373 (42.48%) |
| Amendment R | A constitutional amendment eliminating property taxes for some owners | Failed | 616,516 (38.34%) | 991,347 (61.66%) |
| Amendment 60 | A constitutional amendment limiting property tax increases | Failed | 427,912 (24.50%) | 1,318,507 (75.50%) |
| Amendment 61 | A constitutional amendment prohibiting state and local governments from borrowing money without voter approval | Failed | 474,772 (26.99%) | 1,284,307 (73.01%) |
| Amendment 62 | A constitutional amendment defining personhood as beginning at conception | Failed | 509,062 (29.47%) | 1,218,490 (70.53%) |
| Amendment 63 | A constitutional amendment preventing the establishment of a universal healthcare system | Failed | 800,155 (46.90%) | 905,944 (53.10%) |
| Proposition 101 | An initiative substantially reforming the motor vehicle, income, and telecom taxes | Failed | 564,588 (32.31%) | 1,183,000 (67.69%) |
| Proposition 102 | An initiative allowing first-time offenders of nonviolent misdemeanors to be released pretrial without bail | Failed | 636,444 (38.03%) | 1,037,103 (61.97%) |

=== 2011 ===
Ballot Measures from 2011
| Measure name | Description | Status | Yes votes | No votes |
|---|---|---|---|---|
| Proposition 103 | An initiative increasing the state income and sales tax | Failed | 349,746 (36.30%) | 611,907 (63.60%) |

=== 2012 ===
Ballot Measures from 2012
| Measure name | Description | Status | Yes votes | No votes |
|---|---|---|---|---|
| Amendment 64 | A constitutional amendment legalizing marijuana | Passed | 1,383,139 (55.32%) | 1,116,894 (44.68%) |
| Amendment 65 | A constitutional amendment relating to corporate contributions to political campaigns | Passed | 1,762,515 (74.01%) | 619,073 (25.99%) |
| Amendment S | A constitutional amendment modifying the state personnel system | Passed | 1,276,405 (56.35%) | 988,541 (43.65%) |

=== 2013 ===
Ballot Measures from 2013
| Measure name | Description | Status | Yes votes | No votes |
|---|---|---|---|---|
| Proposition AA | An initiative imposing several new taxes on marijuana sales for the purpose of funding school construction and marijuana regulation | Passed | 902,181 (65.27%) | 479,992 (34.73%) |
| Amendment 66 | A constitutional amendment raising some state taxes for the purpose of funding education | Failed | 496,151 (35.54%) | 899,927 (64.46%) |

=== 2014 ===
Ballot Measures from 2014
| Measure name | Description | Status | Yes votes | No votes |
|---|---|---|---|---|
| Amendment 67 | A constitutional amendment redefining the terms "person" and "child" to include human fetuses | Failed | 702,544 (35.13%) | 1,297,299 (64.87%) |
| Amendment 68 | A constitutional amendment allowing limited gambling at some horse racetracks for the purpose of funding a kindergarten fund | Failed | 597,239 (29.62%) | 1,419,095 (70.38%) |
| Proposition 104 | An initiative requiring collective bargaining negotiations for school employees to be open to the public | Passed | 1,364,747 (70.09%) | 582,473 (29.91%) |
| Proposition 105 | An initiative requiring that food containing GMOs carry a label clearly identifying them as such | Failed | 694,738 (34.53%) | 1,317,288 (65.47%) |

=== 2015 ===
Ballot Measures from 2015
| Measure name | Description | Status | Yes votes | No votes |
|---|---|---|---|---|
| Proposition BB | An initiative allowing the state to retain $66,000,000 in marijuana tax revenues for the purpose of funding school construction projects | Passed | 847,380 (69.39%) | 373,734 (30.61%) |

=== 2016 ===
Ballot Measures from 2016
| Measure name | Description | Status | Yes votes | No votes |
|---|---|---|---|---|
| Amendment T | A constitutional amendment prohibiting slavery as a punishment for a crime | Failed | 1,280,037 (49.68%) | 1,296,722 (50.32%) |
| Amendment U | A constitutional amendment exempting some assets from taxation | Failed | 1,103,593 (43.85%) | 1,412,923 (56.15%) |
| Amendment 69 | A constitutional amendment creating a universal healthcare system for Colorado residents | Failed | 568,683 (21.23%) | 2,109,868 (78.77%) |
| Amendment 70 | A constitutional amendment raising the minimum wage to $12.00 an hour | Passed | 1,517,903 (55.36%) | 1,224,189 (44.64%) |
| Amendment 71 | A constitutional amendment requiring initiative petitioners to gather signatures in all 35 state senate districts and imposing a 55% vote threshold for future constitutional amendments | Passed | 1,476,948 (55.69%) | 1,175,324 (44.31%) |
| Amendment 72 | An initiative raising taxes on cigarettes by $1.75 | Failed | 1,286,851 (46.94%) | 1,454,342 (53.06%) |
| Proposition 106 | An initiative legalizing assisted death | Passed | 1,765,786 (64.87%) | 956,263 (35.13%) |
| Proposition 107 | An initiative creating an open primary system for presidential elections | Passed | 1,701,599 (64.09%) | 953,246 (35.91%) |
| Proposition 108 | An initiative allowing unaffiliated electors to vote in primary elections | Passed | 1,398,577 (53.27%) | 1,227,117 (46.73%) |

=== 2018 ===
Ballot Measures from 2018
| Measure name | Description | Status | Yes votes | No votes |
|---|---|---|---|---|
| Amendment A | A constitutional amendment prohibiting slavery as a punishment for a crime | Passed | 1,599,790 (66.21%) | 816,342 (33.79%) |
| Amendment V | A constitutional amendment lowering the minimum age for state legislators from 25 to 21 | Failed | 889,179 (36.19%) | 1,567,560 (63.81%) |
| Amendment W | A constitutional amendment allowing county clerks to consolidate judge retention questions on election ballots | Failed (Note: Since 2016, with the passage of Amendment 71, constitutional amendments need 55% of the vote to pass.) | 1,262,713 (53.81%) | 1,083,712 (46.19%) |
| Amendment X | A constitutional amendment redefining "industrial hemp" | Passed | 1,421,630 (60.64%) | 922,597 (39.36%) |
| Amendment Y | A constitutional amendment creating a 12-member redistricting committee for congressional districts | Passed | 1,711,008 (71.37%) | 686,260 (28.63%) |
| Amendment Z | A constitutional amendment creating a 12-member redistricting committee for General Assembly districts | Passed | 1,687,583 (71.07%) | 687,113 (28.93%) |
| Amendment 73 | A constitutional amendment establishing a graduated income tax | Failed | 1,137,527 (46.43%) | 1,312,331 (53.57%) |
| Amendment 74 | A constitutional amendment requiring property owners be compensated if their property value decreased due to changes in state law | Failed | 1,139,205 (46.42%) | 1,315,182 (53.58%) |
| Amendment 75 | A constitutional amendment allowing candidates in races where a self-funded candidate gives their campaign at least $1,000,000 to accept more than the standard campaign contribution limit | Failed | 813,861 (34.04%) | 1,576,835 (65.96%) |
| Proposition 109 | An initiative allowing the state to issue $3,500,000,000 in bonds for the purpose of funding statewide transportation projects | Failed | 952,814 (39.28%) | 1,472,933 (60.72%) |
| Proposition 110 | An initiative authorizing the state to issue $6,000,000,000 in bonds for the purpose of funding statewide transportation projects and raising the state sales tax rate | Failed | 990,287 (40.61%) | 1,448,535 (59.39%) |
| Proposition 111 | An initiative capping payday loan interest rates | Passed | 1,865,200 (77.25%) | 549,357 (22.75%) |
| Proposition 112 | An initiative mandating that new fracking projects be at least 2,500 feet from occupied buildings | Failed | 1,116,738 (44.88%) | 1,371,284 (55.12%) |

=== 2019 ===
Ballot Measures from 2019
| Measure name | Description | Status | Yes votes | No votes |
|---|---|---|---|---|
| Proposition CC | An initiative allowing the state to retain excess revenue and direct it towards transportation and education programs | Failed | 724,060 (46.34%) | 838,282 (53.66%) |
| Proposition DD | An initiative legalizing sports betting | Passed | 800,745 (51.41%) | 756,712 (48.59%) |

=== 2020 ===
Ballot Measures from 2020
| Measure name | Description | Status | Yes votes | No votes |
|---|---|---|---|---|
| Amendment B | A constitutional amendment repealing the Gallagher Amendment | Passed | 1,740,395 (57.52%) | 1,285,136 (42.48%) |
| Amendment C | A constitutional amendment lowering the entry requirements for charitable lotteries | Failed | 1,586,973 (52.35%) | 1,444,553 (47.65%) |
| Amendment 76 | A constitutional amendment restricting voting to United States citizens | Passed | 1,985,239 (62.90%) | 1,171,137 (37.10%) |
| Amendment 77 | A constitutional amendment allowing voters in Central, Black Hawk, and Cripple Creek cities to expand gambling | Passed | 1,854,153 (60.54%) | 1,208,414 (39.46%) |
| Proposition EE | An initiative to tax nicotine products for the purpose of funding health and education programs | Passed | 2,134,608 (67.56%) | 1,025,182 (32.44%) |
| Proposition 113 | A referendum to uphold Colorado's membership in the National Popular Vote Interstate Compact | Passed | 1,644,716 (52.33%) | 1,498,500 (47.67%) |
| Proposition 114 | An initiative requiring the Colorado Parks and Wildlife Commission to create a management plan to reintroduce gray wolves | Passed | 1,590,299 (50.91%) | 1,533,313 (49.09%) |
| Proposition 115 | An initiative banning abortions after 22 weeks | Failed | 1,292,787 (41.01%) | 1,859,479 (58.99%) |
| Proposition 116 | An initiative decreasing state income tax rates from 4.63% to 4.55% | Passed | 1,821,702 (57.86%) | 1,327,025 (42.14%) |
| Proposition 117 | An initiative requiring statewide voter approval for some new state enterprises | Passed | 1,573,114 (52.55%) | 1,420,445 (47.45%) |
| Proposition 118 | An initiative creating a paid family and medical leave program | Passed | 1,804,546 (57.75%) | 1,320,386 (42.25%) |

=== 2021 ===
Ballot Measures from 2021
| Measure name | Description | Status | Yes votes | No votes |
|---|---|---|---|---|
| Amendment 78 | A constitutional amendment transferring power over custodial funds from the state treasurer to the General Assembly | Failed | 646,983 (43.03%) | 856,704 (56.97%) |
| Proposition 119 | An initiative raising the marijuana sales tax for the purpose of funding a Learning Enrichment and Academic Progress Program | Failed | 701,479 (45.75%) | 831,670 (54.25%) |
| Proposition 120 | An initiative modifying property tax rates and allowing the state to spend $25,000,000 over the TABOR cap to reimburse localities for lost revenue | Failed | 652,382 (42.96%) | 866,197 (57.04%) |

=== 2022 ===
Ballot Measures from 2022
| Measure name | Description | Status | Yes votes | No votes |
|---|---|---|---|---|
| Amendment D | A constitutional amendment directing the Governor to assign judges to Colorado's 23rd judicial district | Passed | 1,502,866 (67.38%) | 727,409 (32.62%) |
| Amendment E | A constitutional amendment extending a property tax exemption to the surviving spouses of deceased military service members | Passed | 2,109,471 (87.93%) | 298,514 (12.07%) |
| Amendment F | A constitutional amendment modifying the rules relating to charitable gaming | Failed | 930,370 (40.64%) | 1,359,027 (59.36%) |
| Proposition FF | An initiative reducing the income tax deduction for some income brackets for the purpose of funding school meals | Passed | 1,384,852 (56.75%) | 1,055,583 (43.25%) |
| Proposition GG | An initiative requiring that ballot measures changing income taxes break down their impact by tax bracket | Passed | 1,704,757 (71.92%) | 665,476 (28.08%) |
| Proposition 121 | An initiative decreasing the state income tax rate from 4.55% to 4.40% | Passed | 1,581,163 (65.24%) | 842,506 (34.76%) |
| Proposition 122 | An initiative decriminalizing some psychedelic plants and fungi | Passed | 1,269,992 (53.64%) | 1,121,124 (46.36%) |
| Proposition 123 | An initiative creating a state affordable housing fund | Passed | 1,269,816 (52.61%) | 1,143,974 (47.39%) |
| Proposition 124 | An initiative increasing the number of liquor store licenses any single individual can hold | Failed | 905,565 (37.69%) | 1,497,346 (62.31%) |
| Proposition 125 | An initiative allowing stores that are licensed to sell beer for off-site consumption to also sell wine for off-site consumption | Passed | 1,228,404 (50.58%) | 1,200,219 (49.42%) |
| Proposition 126 | An initiative allowing stores that are licensed to sell alcohol for off-site consumption to also offer delivery | Failed | 1,183,059 (48.86%) | 1,238,074 (51.14%) |

=== 2023 ===
| Measure name | Description | Status | Yes votes | No votes |
|---|---|---|---|---|
| Proposition HH | A measure modifying the level and distribution of property taxes | Failed | 682,667 (40.69%) | 995,259 (59.31%) |
| Proposition II | A measure requiring the state to spend excess tobacco tax revenues from 2020's Proposition EE on preschool education programs | Passed | 1,130,047 (67.53%) | 543,405 (32.47%) |

=== 2024 ===
| Measure name | Description | Status | Yes votes | No votes |
|---|---|---|---|---|
| Amendment G | A constitutional amendment expanding veterans who qualify for property tax exemptions. | Passed | 2,212,022 (73.13%) | 812,638 (26.87%) |
| Amendment H | A constitutional amendment modifying judicial discipline procedures. | Passed | 2,150,820 (73.05%) | 793,642 (26.95%) |
| Amendment I | A constitutional amendment granting exceptions to the right to bail for certain violent crimes. | Passed | 2,058,063 (68.34%) | 953,652 (31.66%) |
| Amendment J | A constitutional amendment repealing the definition of marriage as between a man and a woman. | Passed | 1,982,200 (64.33%) | 1,099,228 (35.67%) |
| Amendment K | A constitutional amendment modifying deadlines for petitioning ballot initiatives. | Failed | 1,293,879 (44.85%) | 1,591,312 (55.15%) |
| Amendment 79 | A constitutional amendment to guarantee the right to an abortion. | Passed | 1,921,593 (61.97%) | 1,179,261 (38.03%) |
| Amendment 80 | A constitutional amendment to guarantee the right to school choice. | Failed | 1,507,236 (49.32%) | 1,548,679 (50.68%) |
| Proposition JJ | A measure to retain taxes already collected by the state from sports betting. | Passed | 2,340,370 (76.44%) | 721,237 (23.56%) |
| Proposition KK | A measure to raise taxes on firearms and ammunition to fund gun safety measures. | Passed | 1,675,123 (54.37%) | 1,406,112 (45.63%) |
| Proposition 127 | A measure prohibiting the hunting of mountain lions, lynxes, and bobcats. | Failed | 1,382,048 (45.26%) | 1,671,710 (54.74%) |
| Proposition 128 | A measure to require certain convicted criminals to serve no less than 85% of their sentence. | Passed | 1,869,231 (62.11%) | 1,140,284 (37.89%) |
| Proposition 129 | A measure to create a veterinary professional associates position in Colorado. | Passed | 1,572,545 (52.76%) | 1,407,814 (47.24%) |
| Proposition 130 | A measure to increase state funding for law enforcement agencies. | Passed | 1,583,118 (52.79%) | 1,415,528 (47.21%) |
| Proposition 131 | A measure to implement blanket primary elections and ranked-choice general elections. | Failed | 1,385,060 (46.47%) | 1,595,256 (53.53%) |

=== 2025 ===
| Measure name | Description | Status | Yes votes | No votes |
|---|---|---|---|---|
| Proposition MM | A measure to reduce state income tax deductions for high-income earners to reimburse public schools that provide students free breakfast and lunch. | Passed | 1,010,644 (59.73%) | 681,400 (40.27%) |
| Proposition LL | A measure to allow the state to keep excess revenue from reduced state income tax deductions to reimburse public schools that provide students free breakfast and lunch. | Passed | 1,116,209 (66.20%) | 569,836 (33.80%) |

=== 2026 ===
| Measure name | Description | Status | Yes votes | No votes |
|---|---|---|---|---|
| Amendment 81 | A constitutional amendment requiring state and local law enforcement to notify the Department of Homeland Security when a person is charged with a violent crime or has a prior felony conviction and the person is unlawfully present in the United States. | Post-Election Reporting In Progress | - | - |
| Amendment 82 | A constitutional amendment to ensure the constitutional right to purchase and sell natural gas. | Post-Election Reporting In Progress | - | - |
| Amendment 83 | A constitutional amendment to ensure the constitutional right to hunt and fish. | Post-Election Reporting In Progress | - | - |
| Amendment 84 | A constitutional amendment to require voters to sign their mail ballot envelopes with the last four digits of their Social Security number or their Colorado driver's license number. | Post-Election Reporting In Progress | - | - |
| Amendment 85 | A constitutional amendment to require ballot titles be written at no more than an 8th grade reading level. | Post-Election Reporting In Progress | - | - |
| Amendment 86 | A constitutional amendment to strengthen rules regarding mid-cycle redistricting. | Post-Election Reporting In Progress | - | - |
| Amendment 87 | A constitutional amendment to implement a graduated income tax. | Post-Election Reporting In Progress | - | - |
| Proposition NN | A measure to increase the state's investment in public education by retaining revenue that would otherwise be refunded to taxpayers. | Post-Election Reporting In Progress | - | - |
| Proposition 132 | A measure to create a mandatory minimum prison sentence of eight years for the distribution of fentanyl. | Post-Election Reporting In Progress | - | - |
| Proposition 133 | A measure to create a mandatory minimum prison sentence of life in prison without parole for crimes related to sex trafficking minors and expanding the definition of child sex trafficking. | Post-Election Reporting In Progress | - | - |
| Proposition 134 | A measure to restrict participation in K-12 and collegiate sports to one's sex assigned at birth. | Post-Election Reporting In Progress | - | - |
| Proposition 135 | A measure to prohibit surgery on minors in response to perception of sex or gender. | Post-Election Reporting In Progress | - | - |
| Proposition 136 | A measure to limit the state income tax rate to a maximum of 4.4% for individuals and corporations. | Post-Election Reporting In Progress | - | - |
| Proposition 137 | A measure to redirect existing sales tax revenue collected from the sale of sporting goods to be spent on conservation, wildfire mitigation, and outdoor recreation programs and to exempt that revenue from limitations. | Post-Election Reporting In Progress | - | - |

== See also ==
- Initiatives and referendums in the United States
- History of Colorado
- Law of Colorado
