= Sexy Pizza =

Restaurant chain in the U.S. state of Colorado

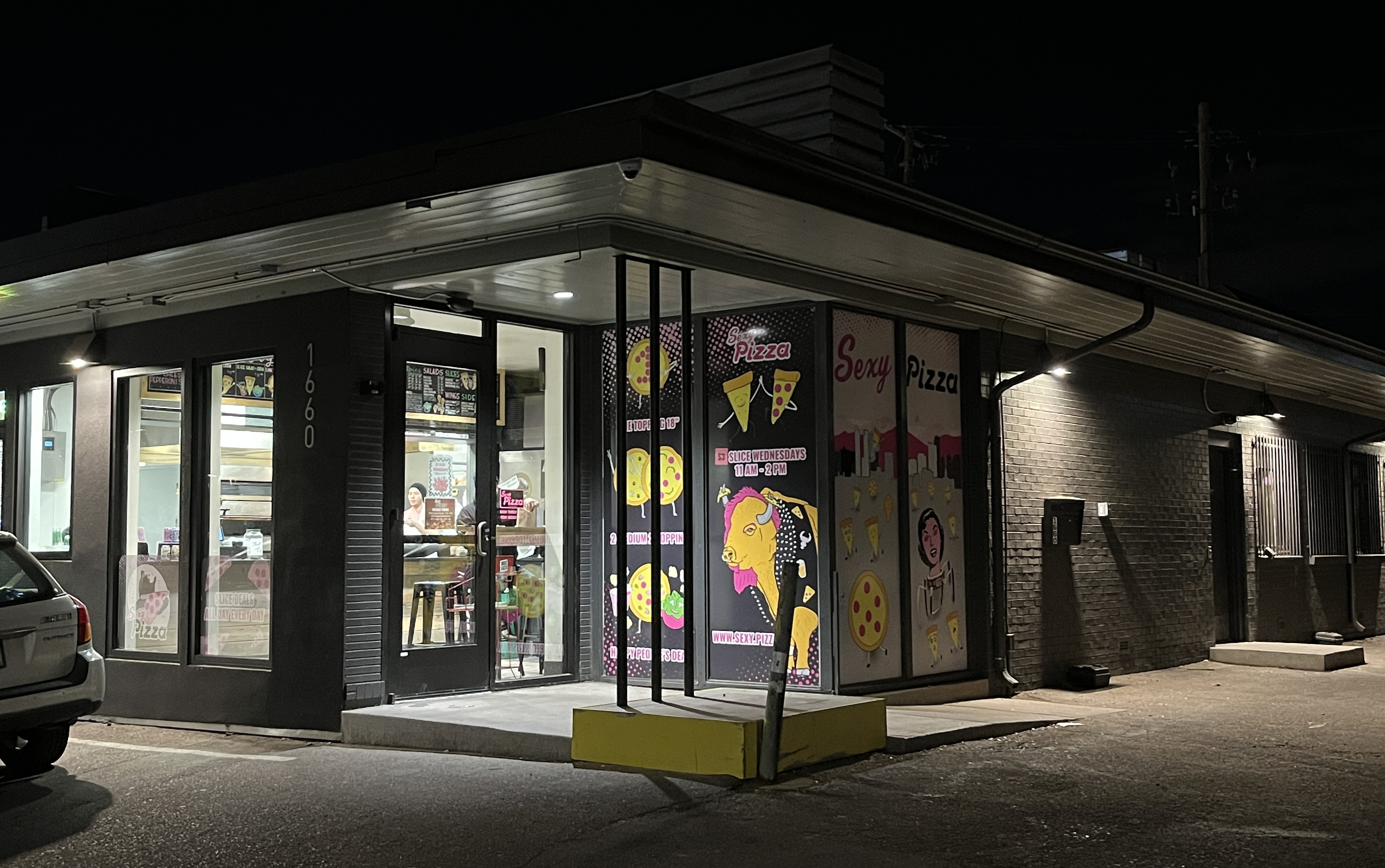
- Exterior of a location in Denver at night, 2025

Restaurant information
- Location: Colorado, United States
- Website: sexy.pizza

Sexy Pizza is an employee-owned chain of pizzerias based in Denver, Colorado, United States.

== Description ==
In addition to pizza, the menu includes calzones, pastas, salads, sandwiches, wings, and desserts.

== History ==
Kayvan Khalatbari, Evan Ackerfeld, and others founded the business in 2008. Khalatbari and Kyle Peters have also been owners.

The business has supported cannabis-related nonprofit organizations, including Law Enforcement Against Prohibition, Medical Marijuana Assistance Program of America, SAFER, and Sensible Colorado. The Associated Press has described Khalatbari as "an outspoken advocate for legal and regulated marijuana". Profits from the business have also supported the local comedy scene.

=== Locations ===
One location operated in Denver's Capitol Hill neighborhood for approximately 15 years. One Denver location has had school-style lockers for homeless people. The business has also operated in Jefferson Park and Old South Pearl. In Trinidad, Sexy Pizza operated alongside Grandma's House in a former train station. Locations have also stocked Narcan.

== Reception ==
Sexy Pizza was the readers' choice in the Best Pizza category of Westword's annual 'Best of Denver' poll in 2012. Kristen Kuchar included the business in the newspaper's 2017 list of ten "great" pizzerias for plant-based options.

== See also ==
- List of pizza chains of the United States
- List of restaurants in Denver
