= 2006 Colorado Amendment 38 =

Amendment 38
- November 7, 2006
- Petitions

Results
Choice	Votes	%
Yes	456,468	30.76%
No	1,027,550	69.24%
Total votes	1,484,018	100.00%
County results
Against
80–90%
70–80%
60–70%

Amendment 38 was a measure on the 2006 ballot in Colorado. If passed, it would have amended the Colorado Constitution. It would have extend the petition process to all levels of state government to expand citizens' ability to propose changes to state laws and local ordinances or resolutions.

Amendment 38 would have made the process of getting an initiative on to a state or local ballot significantly easier. It would have expanded the ability of citizens to propose new laws, and limits government’s ability to change or repeal measures that voters have decided.

Ballot measure proponents would have been able to write their own descriptions of the measure for the state’s Blue Book of ballot measure information. Currently the nonpartisan Legislative Council staff writes these descriptions.

Under Amendment 38, any elected official or government employee who makes a public statement regarding any ballot measure would be subject to fines of $3,000 or more.

== Contents ==
The amendment appeared on the ballot as follows:

An amendment to the Colorado constitution concerning initiative and referendum petitions, and, in connection therewith, changing petition rights and procedures; allowing petitions to be submitted at all levels of Colorado government; limiting initiative ballot titles to 75 words; changing single subject requirements and procedures; limiting the annual number of new laws that governments may exclude from possible referendum petitions; establishing standards for review of filed petitions; specifying that petitions may be voted on at any November election; limiting the use of government resources to discuss a petition; requiring voter approval for future petition laws and rules and for changes to certain voter approved petitions; and authorizing measures to enforce the amendment.

== Results ==
Amendment 38 failed to pass 69.24% to 30.76%.

== See also ==
- List of Colorado ballot measures
