= 2006 Colorado Referendum G =

Referendum G
- November 7, 2006
- Elimination of Obsolete Constitutional Provisions

Results
Choice	Votes	%
Yes	1,092,293	76.08%
No	343,495	23.92%
Total votes	1,435,788	100.00%
County results
For
80–90%
70–80%
60–70%
50–60%
Against
50–60%

Referendum G was a 2006 Colorado ballot measure. It removed provisions, dates, and references to obsolete laws from three sections of the state Constitution. The laws removed regarded militia duty dating back to the post-Civil War era, the consolidation of the Denver Public School District which has already occurred, and references to gender and past dates in the Old-Age Pension Fund.

== Results ==
Elimination of Obsolete Constitutional Provisions
Choice	Votes	%
Yes	1,092,293	76.08%
No	343,495	23.92%
