= 2006 Colorado Amendment 44 =

Referendum that would have legalized marijuana

Amendment 44
- November 7, 2006
- Marijuana Possession

Results
Choice	Votes	%
Yes	636,938	41.08%
No	913,408	58.92%
Total votes	1,550,346	100.00%
County results
For
70–80%
60–70%
50–60%
Against
80–90%
70–80%
60–70%
50–60%

Amendment 44 was a proposed amendment to the state statutes submitted for referendum in the 2006 general elections in the U.S. state of Colorado. The amendment proposed the legalization of the possession of one ounce or less of marijuana for any person twenty-one years of age and over, as long as marijuana use does not occur in public. The measure was eventually defeated at the polls by 59-41 percent.

== Background ==
Amendment 44 was placed on the ballot in August, after the group Safer Alternative For Enjoyable Recreation (SAFER) obtained over 129,000 petition signatures through a largely grassroots organization. Only 68,000 were required by the Secretary of State.

Existing Colorado law classifies possession of one ounce or less of marijuana as a Class 2 petty offense punishable by a fine of $100. If passed, Amendment 44 would decriminalize possession of one ounce or less by adults 21 years of age and over by removing any fine or penalty; although, it would have no effect on the cultivation, transfer, or sale of marijuana.

== Controversy over Colorado Blue Book ==
One issue under contention is how the amendment might be interpreted with regard to transferral of marijuana to minors over 15 years of age. The "Blue Book" voter information pamphlet, a comprehensive guide to ballot measures distributed to voters, states "transferring up to one ounce of marijuana to another individual 15 years of age or older as long as there is no compensation" would be decriminalized under Amendment 44. Others, including the amendment's supporters, claim this interpretation is false, and such transferral to minors would continue to be illegal, as it falls under the category of contributing to the delinquency of a minor, a felony offense under existing law.

== Opinions ==
=== Support ===
Groups in favor of Amendment 44 include Sensible Colorado, a group favoring the legalization, regulation, and taxation of marijuana much in the same manner as alcohol., the state Libertarian Party, and the US Marijuana Party, among others.

Supporters argue that the war on drugs has failed, resulting in the empowerment of organized crime, and that a new more effective policy is needed. It is argued that legalizing small amounts of marijuana would free law enforcement resources to deal with more serious offenses. Some supporters also consider marijuana to be less harmful then other types of illegal narcotics, alcoholic beverages or tobacco use.

=== Opposition ===
Groups opposing Amendment 44 include Guarding Our Children Against Marijuana (GOCAM), Drug Watch Colorado, and Students Against Marijuana, among others.

Opponents argue that marijuana serves as a gateway drug to other types of illegal narcotics, and that legalization of marijuana would increase other types of drug use and make the state a magnet for addicts; however, there is no evidence marijuana is a gateway drug. It is argued that as with alcohol, sobriety is the only safe alternative, and existing drug laws should be enforced. Opponents also state that the costs of enforcement are minimal compared to the costs of drug addiction and treatment, as well as the fact that legalization at the state level would not affect federal laws and international treaties concerning marijuana.

Some employees of the Drug Enforcement Administration were reported to have been financing opposition to Amendment 44, a move which generated significant controversy.

== See also ==
- Decriminalization of marijuana in the United States
- Legal history of marijuana in the United States
- Legal issues of cannabis
- List of Colorado ballot measures
