= 2000 Colorado Amendment 20 =

Ballot measure in Colorado legalizing medical marijuana

Amendment 20
- November 7, 2000
- Medical Use of Marijuana

Results
Choice	Votes	%
Yes	915,943	53.53%
No	794,983	46.47%
Total votes	1,710,926	100.00%
For
80–90%
70–80%
60–70%
50–60%
Against
70–80%
60–70%
50–60%

Year	Significant marijuana related event
2000	Colorado voters approve Amendment 20 by 54 percent.
2001	Colorado health department creates registry for patients.
2004	There are 512 patients on the registry.
2005	There are 730 patients on the registry.
2006	There are 1,040 patients on the registry.
2008	There are 4,720 patients on the registry.
2009	February – U.S. Fed says they will no longer raid medical marijuana operations.
2009	July - The state Health Board rejects caregiver patient limits.
2009	July - There are 11,094 patients on the registry.
2009	August - A jury acquits a patient with 17 times their legal limit.
2009	October - State court determines a caregiver must do more than just provide marijuana.
2009	November - Judge overturns the Board of Health decision to reconsider its rules.

Amendment 20 was an amendment to state statutes, submitted for referendum in the 2000 general elections in the U.S. state of Colorado. The amendment was adopted by 54% of participating voters. Under the law, patients may possess up to 2 ounces of medicinal marijuana and may cultivate no more than six marijuana plants (three flowering plants) at a time. Patients who are caught with more than this in their possession may argue "affirmative defense of medical necessity" but are not protected under state law with the rights of those who stay within the guidelines set forth by the state.^{[4]}

== Background ==
In the years immediately leading up to the Amendment's adoption there was a newfound interest in medical marijuana research. Between 1996 and 2000 eight states approved some form of medical marijuana use. Advocates and opponents both pointed to scientific evidence to make their case. The director of the white house office National Drug Control policy sought clear answers and so they asked a non-governmental body the Institute of Medicine to reviewed the medical data. After eighteen months and considering more than five hundred scientific papers the IOM found that there was remarkable consensus for the potential of cannabinoid based drugs for medical use and almost no data about any proven benefits.

== Implementation ==
As of April 20, 2010 Denver has two hundred fifty medical marijuana dispensaries in operation and Boulder had one hundred. More than sixty thousand patients held red cards with a six-month waiting list to be added to the growing registry. Experts estimated there may be as many as 100,000 patients in the system.

For a patient to access the system they need to get a "doctor's recommendation", which differs from a prescription. This recommendation can be had for about one hundred fifty dollars and may consist of a five to ten minute conversation. The state recognized recommendation, called a "red card" due to its red color, can be used at any marijuana dispensary in the state, though naming a single marijuana dispensary as a patient's "caregiver" often affords the patient discounts on medicine.

== Text of referendum ==
Shall there be an amendment to the Colorado Constitution authorizing the medical use of marijuana for persons suffering from debilitating medical conditions, and, in connection therewith, establishing an affirmative defense to Colorado criminal laws for patients and their primary care-givers relating to the medical use of marijuana; establishing exceptions to Colorado criminal laws for patients and primary care-givers in lawful possession of a registry identification card for medical marijuana use and for physicians who advise patients or provide them with written documentation as to such medical marijuana use; defining "debilitating medical condition" and authorizing the state health agency to approve other medical conditions or treatments as debilitating medical conditions; requiring preservation of seized property interests that had been possessed, owned, or used in connection with a claimed medical use of marijuana and limiting forfeiture of such interests; establishing and maintaining a confidential state registry of patients receiving an identification card for the medical use of marijuana and defining eligibility for receipt of such a card and placement on the registry; restricting access to information in the registry; establishing procedures for issuance of an identification card; authorizing fees to cover administrative costs associated with the registry; specifying the form and amount of marijuana a patient may possess and restrictions on its use; setting forth additional requirements for the medical use of marijuana by patients less than eighteen years old; directing enactment of implementing legislation and criminal penalties for certain offenses; requiring the state health agency designated by the governor to make application forms available to residents of Colorado for inclusion on the registry; limiting a health insurer's liability on claims relating to the medical use of marijuana; and providing that no employer must accommodate medical use of marijuana in the workplace?

== See also ==
- Decriminalization of marijuana in the United States
- Legal history of marijuana in the United States
- List of Colorado ballot measures
