= 2006 Colorado Referendum E =

Referendum E
- November 7, 2006
- Property Tax Reduction for Disabled Veterans

Results
Choice	Votes	%
Yes	1,195,907	79.24%
No	313,292	20.76%
Total votes	1,509,199	100.00%
County results
For
80–90%
70–80%
60–70%
50–60%

Referendum E was a 2006 referendum in Colorado to reduce property taxes for qualified disabled veterans by exempting a portion of the value of their home from property taxation. Voters approved the referendum 79% to 21%. A qualified disabled veteran would have a service-connected disability with a 100 percent permanent disability rating. It was approved by the electorate and became Article X Section 3.5 of the state constitution. Subsequent enabling legislation in 2007 removed military disability retirements as a recognized eligibility, leaving only disability ratings of the US Department of Veterans Affairs. No similar provision has been made for survivors of active duty military who die in the line of duty.

In its administration of the program by Colorado's Department of Military and Veterans Affairs, the U.S. Department of Veterans Affairs' ratings for Total Disability for Permanent Unemployability (TDIU) are disallowed from the exemption although "permanent, total and service-connected" as per Article X Section 3.5 and thus apparently eligible.

House Bill 14-1205 provided for survivors of disabled veterans to receive the property tax exemption if the veteran was in receipt of the exemption at time of death. As of 2014 approximately 3814 Colorado residents received the exemption, funds for which are provided each county by the state.

== See also ==
- List of Colorado ballot measures
