= 2006 Colorado Referendum F =

Referendum F
- November 7, 2006
- Recall Deadlines

Results
Choice	Votes	%
Yes	626,015	44.68%
No	775,207	55.32%
Total votes	1,401,222	100.00%
County results
For
50–60%
Against
70–80%
60–70%
50–60%

Colorado Referendum F was a referendum held in Colorado, United States, in 2006, and proposed to change the requirements for recalling elected officials, allowing the state legislature to relax deadlines for protesting recall petitions. The effect of this measure would be to make it more difficult to recall an elected state official. The referendum was turned down by 55.3% of voters.

== Results ==
Referendum F
Choice	Votes	%
For	626,015	44.68
Against	775,207	55.32
Total	1,401,222	100.00

== See also ==
- List of Colorado ballot measures
