= 1972 Denver Winter Olympics referendum =

Amendment 8
- An Act to Amend Articles X and XI of the State Constitution to prohibit the State from levying taxes and appropriating or loaning funds for the purpose of aiding or furthering the 1976 Winter Olympic Games.

Results
Choice	Votes	%
Yes	514,228	59.44%
No	350,964	40.56%
Valid votes	865,192	100.00%
Invalid or blank votes	0	0.00%
Total votes	865,192	100.00%
County results
For
70%–80%
60%–70%
50%–60%
Against
50%–60%

The Denver Winter Olympics referendum was held in November 1972 following the awarding to Denver of the 1976 Winter Olympics.

The selection process for the 1976 Winter Olympics consisted of four bids, and saw Denver, Colorado, United States, selected ahead of Sion, Switzerland; Tampere, Finland; and Vancouver, British Columbia, Canada. The selection was made at the 70th IOC Session in Amsterdam on 12 May 1970. In a 1972 referendum, voters in Colorado rejected funding for the Olympics, the only time a city awarded the Olympics rejected them. Denver officially withdrew on 15 November, and Sion, the runner-up, also declined to host the Olympics. The IOC then offered the Olympics to Whistler, British Columbia, Canada, but they too declined owing to a change of government following elections. Whistler went on to be associated with neighbouring Vancouver's successful bid for the 2010 Winter Olympics.

Salt Lake City, Utah, offered to host, then pulled its bid and was replaced by Lake Placid, New York. Still reeling from the Denver rejection, the IOC declined and on 5 February 1973, selected Innsbruck, Austria, which had hosted nine years earlier in 1964. In autumn 1974, Lake Placid was awarded the 1980 Winter Olympics, its second; Salt Lake hosted in 2002 and will again in 2034. To date, Colorado has yet to host an Olympics.

== Contents ==
The amendment appeared on the ballot as:

An Act to Amend Articles X and XI of the State Constitution to prohibit the State from levying taxes and appropriating or loaning funds for the purpose of aiding or furthering the 1976 Winter Olympic Games.

== Aftermath ==
Richard Lamm was an obscure state legislator from Denver when he led the campaign; after the referendum he was elected to three terms as governor, serving from 1975 to 1987.

Within three months, Innsbruck, Austria was selected as the replacement city, hosting the Winter Olympics for the second time, after 1964.

== See also ==
- List of Colorado ballot measures
