= 2006 Colorado Referendum H =

Referendum H
- November 7, 2006
- Limiting a State Business Income Tax Deduction

Results
Choice	Votes	%
Yes	744,475	50.74%
No	722,651	49.26%
Total votes	1,467,126	100.00%
County results
For
50–60%
Against
70–80%
60–70%
50–60%

Referendum H was a 2006 Colorado referendum to bar businesses from claiming a state income tax business deduction for wages paid to workers who were known at the time of hiring to be undocumented immigrants. It passed and it affected employees hired on and after January 1, 2008.

== Arguments ==
Arguments for: It targets the employment of unauthorized aliens, which is the root cause of illegal immigration. It reduces the financial advantage a business gains from paying lower wages to people illegally in the country.

Arguments against: It will have little or no effect on illegal immigration because it increases taxes only if a business voluntarily discloses its paid wages to unauthorized aliens. Illegal immigration is a national issue and the responsibility of the federal government.

Who's for it? --Rep. Debbie Benefield, D-Jefferson County

Who's against it? --Douglas Bruce

== See also ==
- List of Colorado ballot measures
