= 2006 Colorado Referendum K =

Referendum K
- November 7, 2006
- Immigration Lawsuit Against Federal Government

Results
Choice	Votes	%
Yes	830,628	55.72%
No	660,012	44.28%
Total votes	1,490,640	100.00%
County results
For
60–70%
50–60%
Against
50–60%

Referendum K was a referendum on the 2006 Colorado ballot. It "directs the Colorado attorney general to initiate, or join other states in, a lawsuit against the U.S. attorney general to demand that the federal government enforce existing federal immigration laws".1 The referendum passed, garnering 55.72% of the vote.

== See also ==
- List of Colorado ballot measures
