= 2008 Colorado Referendum L =

Referendum L
- Qualifications for Serving in the State Legislature

Results
Choice	Votes	%
Yes	1,010,896	46.52%
No	1,162,296	53.48%
Valid votes	2,173,192	89.85%
Invalid or blank votes	245,610	10.15%
Total votes	2,418,802	100.00%
Registered voters/turnout	2,637,766	91.7%
County results
For
60%–70%
50%–60%
Against
60%–70%
50%–60%

Referendum L was a referendum in Colorado, USA in 2008, to lower the age requirement to participate in the Colorado State Legislature from 25 to 21. The measure was rejected by voters 53.7% to 46.3% on November 4, 2008.

== Results ==
Referendum L
Choice	Votes	%
For	1,010,896	46.52
Against	1,162,296	53.48
Total	2,173,192	100.00

== See also ==
- List of Colorado ballot measures
