= 2006 Colorado Amendment 42 =

Amendment 42
- November 7, 2006
- Colorado Minimum Wage

Results
Choice	Votes	%
Yes	823,526	53.30%
No	721,531	46.70%
Total votes	1,545,057	100.00%
County results
For
70–80%
60–70%
50–60%
Against
60–70%
50–60%

Amendment 42 was a ballot initiative, adopted by Colorado voters in November 2006, that amended Article XVIII of the Colorado Constitution to impose a minimum wage of $6.85 per hour, to be adjusted annually for inflation after 2007. The amendment was approved by 53.3% of voters.

The minimum wage in Colorado at the time of the election was $5.15 per hour.

== See also ==
- List of Colorado ballot measures
