= Mason Tvert =

Mason Tvert is an American marijuana rights activist, founder of Safer Alternative For Enjoyable Recreation, and current communications director for the Marijuana Policy Project in Colorado. He has been described as the "Don Draper of Pot" by Politico which also considers him to be one of the primary factors in the legalization of personal use of marijuana in Colorado. At one point in his advocacy he was known to have challenged John Hickenlooper and Pete Coors to a contest that Tvert would take a puff on a joint for every beer they drank.
