= 2006 Colorado Referendum J =

Referendum J
- November 7, 2006
- School District Spending Requirements

Results
| Choice | Votes | % |
|---|---|---|
| Yes | 620,790 | 41.53% |
| No | 874,148 | 58.47% |
| Total votes | 1,494,938 | 100.00% |
County results
For
50–60%
Against
70–80%
60–70%
50–60%

2006 Colorado Referendum J was a failed ballot measure to implement stricter opening requirements for public school district budgets in Colorado.

== Background ==
Colorado law required school districts to set aside money from within the total budget for specific purposes, such as buildings, insurance, books and other school supplies, and services for "at-risk" students. These specific budgetary earmarks accounted $600 on average per student according to 2004–2005 school year figures — roughly eight percent of district operating budgets. Referendum J proposed a new requirement: each school district must spend a minimum of 65% of its operating budget on a set of budget items specified in the referendum.

== Budget items ==
Referendum J required that 65% of school district operating budgets be spent on the following budgetary items:

- books and other instructional materials
- classroom computers
- field trips, athletics, arts, and music
- libraries and librarians
- principals
- support services provided at the school level
  - college placement services
  - food services
  - student health and medical services
  - student testing
  - teacher training
  - transportation
- support staff
  - bus drivers
  - food service workers
  - guidance counselors
  - nurses
- teachers, classroom aides, and tutors

Notably absent from Referendum J were:

- superintendents and school boards
- building construction, maintenance, and repairs
- central administrative functions
  - accounting
  - budgeting
  - payroll

== Corrective action ==
Schools that fell short of budgetary requirements set forth in Referendum J would be required to increase budgetary earmarks for specified items by two percent per year until minimums were met. Provisions were made for districts to request a waiver for a period of one year. The referendum allowed voters to exempt specific districts from its budgetary requirements, and standardized budget submission formats to the state to facilitate tracking of Referendum J compliance.

== Estimated fiscal impact ==
The Colorado Department of Education's oversight of Referendum J requirements was expected to increase state costs by approximately $62,000 annually. School district costs may have also been increased by requiring more detailed expenditure tracking, budget planning, and budget submission procedures introduced with Referendum J if it passed. Referendum J did not increase funding for public education.

== Differences with Amendment 39 ==
Amendment 39 was also on the 2006 ballot. It was a proposed amendment to the state Constitution, which also proposed changes to school district budgetary requirements. Notably different was that Amendment 39 did not require that any of the earmarked 65% of funding go to principals, support staff, or support services provided at the school level.

The two ballot items also defined a district's operating budget differently, which could affect various districts differently. Using the 2004–2005 school year as an example, the budget expenditures on items specified in Referendum J received 83% of district operating budgets on average, already well over the 65% that would be required by the new law, while according to Amendment 39's budget definitions only 60% of the budget was already spent in that year on the budget items specified by Amendment 39.

Aside from the average, individual school budget analyses showed that at least some schools in the state failed to meet the 65% requirements set forth by each of the ballot proposals. 166 school districts would have fallen short by a total of $278 million according to the requirements of Amendment 39, while three districts would have fallen short for a total of approximately one million dollars under the requirements of Referendum J, if they had both been in effect for the 2004–2005 school year.
