= Denver Initiative 300 =

US program to allow designated areas for public consumption of marijuana

The Neighborhood-Supported Cannabis Consumption Pilot Program Initiative (I-300), more commonly known as the Denver Initiative 300 or the Social Pot Use Initiative, allows for limited public consumption of cannabis within the city limits of Denver, Colorado. This ballot initiative was passed by voters on November 8, 2016 by a 53.57% to 46.43% margin. Initiative 300 is a pilot program which will sunset in 2020 unless extended by city council or an additional voter initiative.

Initiative 300 is the first program of its kind to allow designated areas for public consumption of marijuana in the United States, permitting regular businesses, such coffee shops, art galleries, entertainment venues, or even yoga studios, to seek permits for bring-your-own marijuana, over-21 consumption areas that are indoors (allowing vaping and edibles, but not smoking) or outdoors (allowing smoking). Shortly after Initiative 300 passed at the polls, the Liquor Enforcement Division of the Colorado Department of Revenue announced new regulations to prevent bars and many restaurants from applying for new social marijuana use permits. In response to Initiative 300, the Colorado State Legislature began debating Senate Bill 184, introduced to provide consistent guidelines statewide for private marijuana membership clubs.

Following the passage of Colorado Amendment 64, allowing the recreational consumption of cannabis, the initiative addresses the challenge of allowing consumption outside of private residences, where options are extremely limited for some members of the public, such as some apartment tenants and tourists. Establishments allowing cannabis consumption will be subject to regulation in a manner similar to alcohol, though will need to garner at least one additional approval from an eligible neighborhood organization prior to applying for a permit with the city.

A "Social Consumption Advisory Committee" including Initiative 300’s backers and its opponents, community members and business representatives first met on January 18, 2017 to help shape the permit program and regulations. A core issue of the committee's debate is whether cannabis use will be permitted on premises that are licensed for the sale and consumption of alcohol. Proponents of the Initiative 300 argue that allowing consumption in licensed bars and restaurants reflected the original intent of the initiative, which voters approved.

== Ballot Question ==
"Shall the voters of the City and County of Denver adopt an ordinance that creates a cannabis consumption pilot program where: the City and County of Denver (the “City”) may permit a business or a person with evidence of support of an eligible neighborhood association or business improvement district to allow the consumption of marijuana (“cannabis”) in a designated consumption area; such associations or districts may set forth conditions on the operation of a designated consumption area, including permitting or restricting concurrent uses, consumptions, or services offered, if any; the designated consumption area is limited to those over the age of twenty-one, must comply with the Colorado Clean Indoor Air Act, may overlap with any other type of business or licensed premise, and cannot be located within 1000 feet of a school; a designated consumption area that is located outside cannot be visible from a public right-of-way or a place where children congregate; the City shall create a task force to study the impacts of cannabis consumption permits on the city; the City may enact additional regulations and ordinances to further regulate designated consumption areas that are not in conflict with this ordinance; and the cannabis consumption pilot program expires on December 31, 2020 or earlier if the City passes comprehensive regulations governing cannabis consumption?"

== Committee ==
The co-chairs of the new advisory committee are Denver licensing director Ashley Kilroy and Molly Duplechian from the city’s Office of Marijuana Policy. Others on the committee include City Council members Kendra Black and Mary Beth Susman, Deputy Chief David Quiñones from Denver police and Marley Bordovsky from the code enforcement section of the City Attorney’s Office.

Emmett Reistroffer, a policy consultant at Denver Relief Consulting who helped lead the Yes on 300 campaign, will be joined by Rachel O’Bryan, who managed the anti-Initiative 300 group Protect Denver’s Atmosphere.

Others of note include University of Denver law professor Sam Kamin, an expert on legal marijuana regulation. Margie Valdez from Inter-Neighborhood Cooperation. She has been critical of Initiative 300 because it allows businesses to seek support from business improvement districts in addition to city-registered neighborhood associations.

- Community representatives Jude Del Hierro and Aubrey Lavizzo
- Business representative Dan Landes, owner of City, O’ City restaurant
- Event planning representative Kobi Waldfogel from Lighthouse Cannabis Project
- Kristi Kelly, interim executive director of the Marijuana Industry Group
- Fran Lanzer, state executive director of Mothers Against Drunk Driving
- Amber Leytem, Healthy Schools Program manager for Denver Public Schools
- Karin McGowan, deputy director of the Colorado Department of Public Health and Environment
- Maureen McNamara, founder of Cannabis Trainers
- Sonia Riggs, president and CEO of the Colorado Restaurant Association
