= Firouzeh Khalatbari =

Iranian economist

- فیروزه خلعتبری
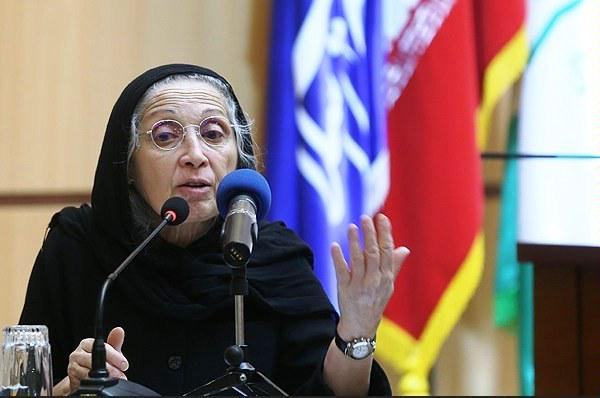
- Education: London School of Economics (BA, PhD)
- Scientific career
- Fields: economics
- Thesis: Planning, Uncertainties and Exhaustible Resources (1976)

Firouzeh Khalatbari (Persian: فیروزه خلعتبری) is an Iranian economist and a faculty member of Center for Strategic Research. She holds a BA in Mathematical Economics and a PhD in Econometrics from the London School of Economics. Her main research interests are sustainable development, subsidies and fuel in Iranian economy. Khalatbari is nicknamed by some media as the "Lady of Iranian Economy".
