= Medical Marijuana Assistance Program of America =

The Medical Marijuana Assistance Program of America (MMAPA) was a medical marijuana preferred provider organization (AT-PPO) in Denver, Colorado. The organization's mission was to make alternative treatment accessible and affordable for disabled veterans, hospice patients, and the indigent.

== History ==
In 2009, Vincent Palazzotto founded the Medical Marijana Assistance Program of America in Denver, Colorado, to raise awareness and remove the negative social stigma associated with a patient's choice in medicine, namely medical marijuana.

In early 2010, the MMAPA acquired and refurbished a 1968 Airstream Overlander International and launched Mobile Doctors of America to ensure patients had access to affordable physicians willing to recommend patients medical marijuana throughout Colorado. In February 2010, CNN toured with the staff of MMAPA and MDARX to document the service in Salida, Colorado. Later that year, MDARX was covered by Saturday Night Live's "In the News" segment hosted by Seth Meyers.

=== Dissolution ===
As of April 30, 2012, the MMAPA has shut down, and is no longer providing benefits or services to its members.
