= Safer Alternative for Enjoyable Recreation =

Non-profit organization in Denver, Colorado

Safer Alternative for Enjoyable Recreation (SAFER)
- Formation: January 2005
- Purpose: Calling on the universities to make penalties for the use and possession of marijuana no greater than the penalties for the use and possession of alcohol.
- Leader: Mason Tvert

Safer Alternative For Enjoyable Recreation (SAFER) is a non-profit organization based in Denver, Colorado. The SAFER campaign was initially launched in Colorado on the campuses of the University of Colorado at Boulder (CU) and Colorado State University (CSU) in response to the alcohol overdose deaths of CSU sophomore Samantha Spady, 19, and 18-year-old CU freshman Lynn "Gordie" Bailey. SAFER, led by Mason Tvert, argued that students should not be punished more severely for using marijuana – which is incapable of causing death by overdose—than for using the potentially fatal (and for many college students legal) drug alcohol.

The pilot project took off quickly. Within months, organizers had coordinated and passed student referendums at both campuses. These referendums called on the universities to make the penalties for the use and possession of marijuana no greater than the penalties for the use and possession of alcohol. Under Colorado state law prior to 2013, having an ounce of marijuana or less is punishable by a $100 fine but no jail time.

In the summer of 2005, SAFER leaders decided to run a citywide marijuana legalization initiative in Denver, Colorado, called the Alcohol-Marijuana Equalization Initiative. The proposed initiative (I-100) would have made the possession of up to one ounce of marijuana legal for individuals 21 and older under city ordinances. After a campaign in which the relative harms of marijuana and alcohol were repeatedly highlighted, the initiative passed November 1, 2005, by a 53.5% to 46.5% margin. The initiative also made possession of marijuana by those under 18 punishable by fine only.

In December 2005, the SAFER Voter Education Fund announced that it would be supporting a statewide campaign in Colorado to make the possession of up to one ounce of marijuana legal under state law. Again, the main argument of the campaign was to be that Colorado residents should not be forced to use alcohol rather than marijuana when they want to unwind or have fun. In August 2006, the Colorado Secretary of State announced that the campaign had collected enough signatures to qualify for the November 2006 ballot. The Alcohol-Marijuana Equalization Initiative Committee is the issue committee in Colorado coordinating the initiative campaign.

Additional SAFER campaigns have been run on college campuses and in cities and towns in the US. In the spring of 2006, students passed "marijuana-and-alcohol equalization" referendums at numerous schools, including the University of Texas at Austin, Florida State University, and the University of Maryland. In these campus efforts, SAFER often works with campus NORML and SSDP chapters. The SAFER campaign has even gone international, with a group taking form in Dublin, Ireland.

SAFER has modeled its campaigns after People for the Ethical Treatment of Animals, pulling publicity stunts such as a "Drug Duel" in which Mason Tvert challenged Mayor John Hickenlooper and beer baron Pete Coors to drink beer while he smoked cannabis, to see who would be the last man standing.
