= 2008 United States ballot measures =

- 2008

Part of the 2008 United States elections

In 2008 there were 74 ballot measures held in the United States. Out of all the ballot measures, 31 passed while 43 failed. They were most commonly initiated state statues and the second most common were initiated state constitutional amendments while veto referendums were the rarest.

== List by state ==
=== Alaska ===
- Alaska Clean Water Initiative

=== Arizona ===
- 2008 Arizona Proposition 102

=== Arkansas ===
- 2008 Arkansas Act 1

=== California ===
- 2008 California Proposition 1A
- 2008 California Proposition 2
- 2008 California Proposition 3
- 2008 California Proposition 4
- 2008 California Proposition 5
- 2008 California Proposition 6
- 2008 California Proposition 7
- 2008 California Proposition 8
- Marsy's Law
- 2008 California Proposition 10
- 2008 California Proposition 11
- 2008 California Proposition 12
- 2008 California Propositions 94, 95, 96, and 97
- 2008 California Propositions 98 and 99
- 2008 California Proposition 91
- 2008 California Proposition 92
- 2008 California Proposition 93

=== Colorado ===
- 2008 Colorado Amendment 46
- 2008 Colorado Amendment 47
- 2008 Colorado Amendment 48
- 2008 Colorado Amendment 49
- 2008 Colorado Amendment 50
- 2008 Colorado Amendment 51
- 2008 Colorado Amendment 52
- 2008 Colorado Amendment 54
- 2008 Colorado Amendment 58
- 2008 Colorado Amendment 59
- 2008 Colorado Referendum L

=== Florida ===
- 2008 Florida Amendment 2

=== Illinois ===
- 2008 Illinois referendum on proposed call for a constitutional convention

=== Massachusetts ===
- 2008 Massachusetts Question 1
- 2008 Massachusetts Question 2
- Massachusetts Greyhound Protection Act

=== Michigan ===
- 2008 Michigan Proposal 1
- 2008 Michigan Proposal 2

=== Nebraska ===
- Nebraska Initiative 424

=== Oregon ===
- 2008 Oregon Ballot Measure 54
- 2008 Oregon Ballot Measure 56
- 2008 Oregon Ballot Measure 57
- 2008 Oregon Ballot Measure 58
- 2008 Oregon Ballot Measure 59
- 2008 Oregon Ballot Measure 60
- 2008 Oregon Ballot Measure 61
- 2008 Oregon Ballot Measure 62
- 2008 Oregon Ballot Measure 63
- 2008 Oregon Ballot Measure 64
- 2008 Oregon Ballot Measure 65

=== South Dakota ===
- South Dakota Open and Clean Government Act
- South Dakota Small Investors Protection Act

=== Washington ===
- Washington Death with Dignity Act

== Notable other measures ==
- 2008 American Samoan referendum
- Measure R (Los Angeles, California)
