= Constitution of Colorado =

Principles, institutions, and law of political governance in the U.S. state of Colorado

Constitution of the State of Colorado
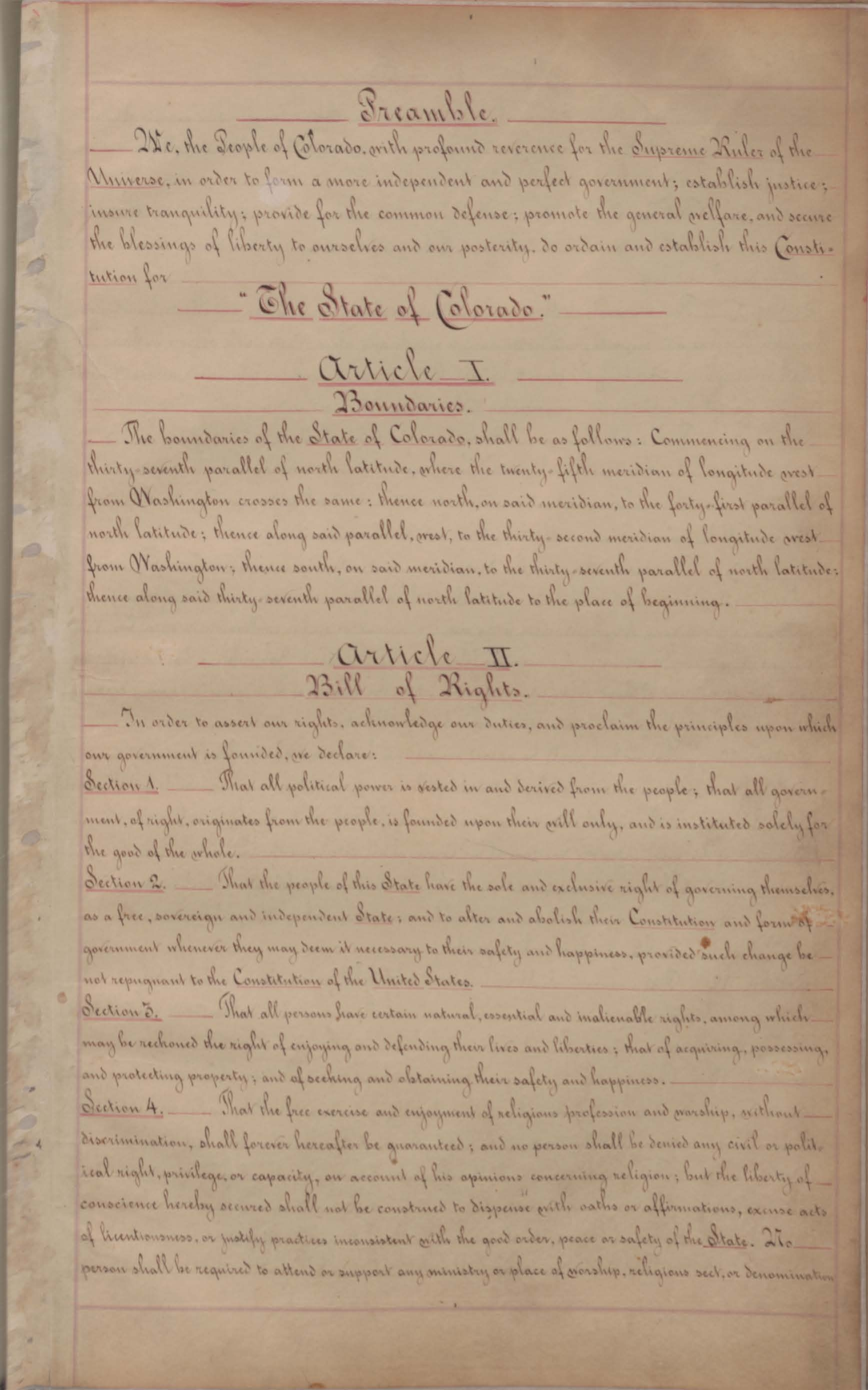
- First page of the original manuscript

Overview
- Jurisdiction: Colorado, United States
- Subordinate to: United States Constitution
- Created: April 14, 1876
- Ratified: July 1, 1876
- Date effective: August 1, 1876

Government structure
- Branches: Three departments
- Chambers: Two (bicameral Colorado General Assembly)
- Executive: Governor of Colorado
- Judiciary: Judiciary of Colorado, headed by the Colorado Supreme Court

History
- Amendments: 168 as of 2022
- Citation: Constitution of the State of Colorado – via Wikisource.
- Supersedes: An Act to provide a temporary Government for the Territory of Colorado

The Constitution of the State of Colorado is the foundation of the laws and government of the U.S. state of Colorado. The Colorado State Constitution was drafted on March 14, 1876; approved by Colorado voters on July 1, 1876; and took effect upon the statehood of Colorado on August 1, 1876. As of 2020, the constitution has been amended at least 166 times. The Constitution of Colorado derives its authority from the sovereignty of the people. As such, the people of Colorado reserved specific powers in governing Colorado directly; in addition to providing for voting for governor, state legislators, and judges, the people of Colorado have reserved initiative of laws and referendum of laws enacted by the legislature to themselves, provided for the recall of office holders, and limit tax increases beyond set amounts without explicit voter approval (via the Taxpayer Bill of Rights), and must explicitly approve any change to the constitution, often with a 55% majority. The Colorado state constitution is one of the longest in the United States.

== Chronology of the Colorado Constitution ==
In June 1858, Green Russell found placer gold along the South Platte River in western Kansas Territory, inciting the Pike's Peak Gold Rush. The first election in the gold fields was held for officers of Arapahoe County, Kansas Territory, on March 3. Unfortunately, voters were at the time unaware that the Kansas Territorial Legislature had split Arapahoe County into six new counties four weeks earlier on February 7. The next month, a constitutional convention was held in Denver City which proposed a new "State of Jefferson" to govern the gold fields.

The first Jefferson Constitutional Convention meeting in Denver City adopted a proposed "Constitution of the State of Jefferson" on August 1, 1859. This proposed state constitution was a modified version of the second Constitution of the State of Iowa that was drafted two years earlier. The next month (September 5), voters of the gold fields reject statehood as premature. On October 3, the second Jefferson Constitutional Convention in Denver City adopted a proposed Constitution of the Territory of Jefferson. This proposed territorial constitution was a modified version of the rejected state constitution that was drafted two months earlier.

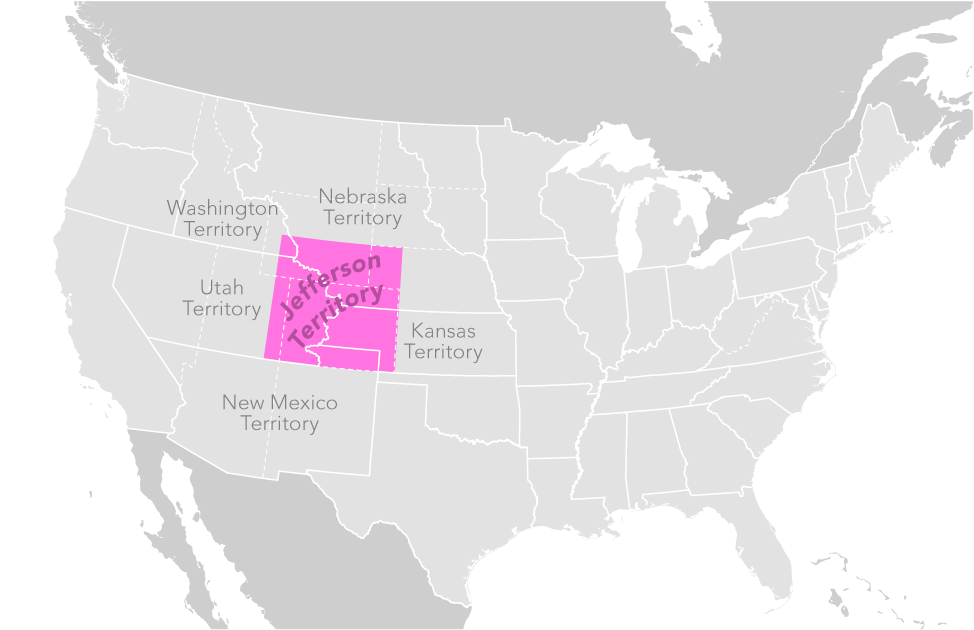
Map of the extralegal Territory of Jefferson

By a vote of 2163 to 280, the voters of the gold fields approved the creation of the free Territory of Jefferson on October 24, 1859. The new territory included portions of the Territory of Kansas, the Territory of Nebraska, the Territory of New Mexico, the Territory of Utah, and the Territory of Washington. The United States Congress refused to recognize this new citizen-initiated territory because of the precarious balance of power between the free states and the slave states in the US. However, the Jefferson Territorial government effectively governed the region until 1861 with little interference from the federal government. The next year, on October 10, 1860, Denver City voters approved the Constitution of the "People's Government of Denver", which operated as an independent municipal government.

On January 29, 1861, "An Act Admitting the State of Kansas to the Union" was signed into law by President James Buchanan. The act included only the eastern two-thirds of the Territory of Kansas in the boundaries of the new state, which left the western portion of the Kansas Territory (claimed by the Territory of Jefferson) formally unorganized. The next month, Buchanan signed the Organic Act for the Territory of Colorado. This new territory occupied most of the extralegal territory of Jefferson, but was 41% less extensive. The Jefferson Territory formally disbanded on June 6, 1861, in favor of the government of the Territory of Colorado.

The American Civil War started in April 1861, shortly after Abraham Lincoln became the president of the US in March. During the war, the Colorado territory's population remained generally supportive of the Union. Lincoln signed "An Enabling Act for the State of Colorado" on March 21, 1864, which allowed the citizens of the territory to organize a state, contingent on later congressional recognition. Three months later, on July 11, 1864, the first Colorado Constitutional Convention in Denver City adopted the first proposed "Constitution of the State of Colorado". This proposed constitution was inspired by the Wyandotte Constitution of the State of Kansas drafted in 1859. However, on October 11, Colorado voters rejected this particular formulation by a vote of 1520 to 4672, primarily because it included a pre-selected slate of candidates for state and national office.

Abraham Lincoln was assassinated in April 1865, and the civil war ended in May. The second Colorado Constitutional Convention adopted their proposed "Constitution of the State of Colorado" on August 12 of that year. Colorado voters approved this constitution on September 1. However, President Andrew Johnson refused to declare the statehood of Colorado, in part because he feared it would lead to a Republican majority in the US Congress. This action frustrated Congress, who subsequently approved a new "Colorado Statehood Bill", which Johnson vetoed May 15, 1866. Congress subsequently approved a second Colorado Statehood Bill, which was also vetoed in January 1867.

Ulysses S. Grant became the President of the United States in March 1869. During Grant's time in office, Congress tried and failed to pass a third, fourth, and fifth Colorado Statehood Bill in 1869, 1871, and 1873 respectively. Then in December 1873, Grant endorsed a second enabling act for Colorado's statehood during his address to congress. The second "Enabling Act for the State of Colorado" was then enacted and signed into law by Grant on March 3, 1875.

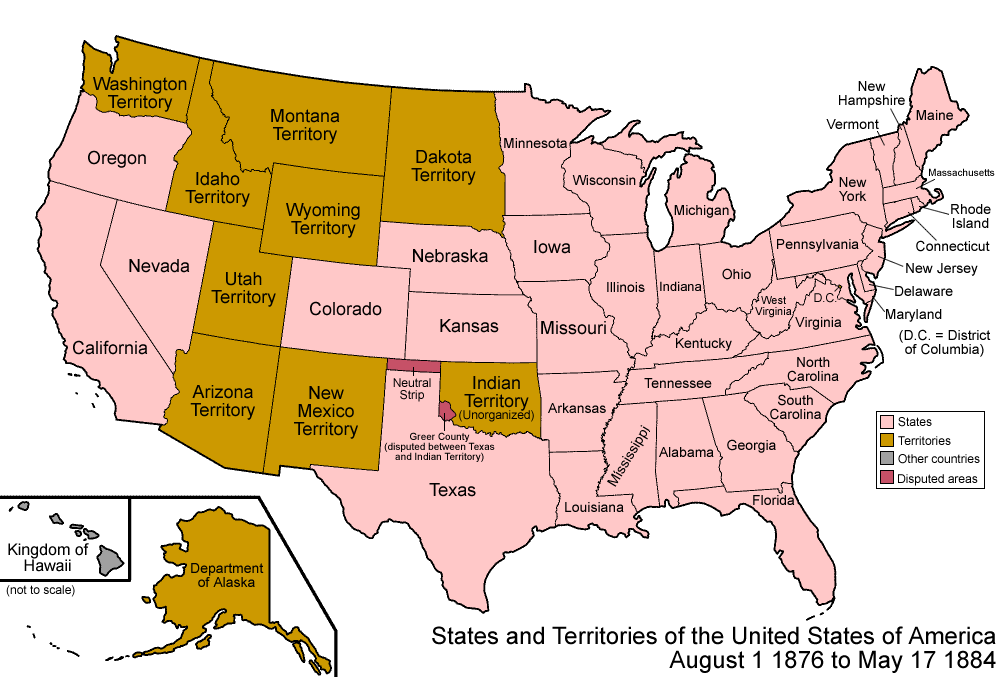
Map of the United States in 1876

Colorado voters elected delegates to the third Colorado Constitutional Convention on October 10, 1875. This convention in Denver adopted their third proposed "Constitution of the State of Colorado" on March 14, 1876. This proposed state constitution was inspired by the third Constitution of the State of Illinois (1870), the fourth Constitution of the Commonwealth of Pennsylvania (1873), and the third Constitution of the State of Missouri (1875). This constitution was at the time (and remains to this day) one of the lengthiest of the state constitutions in the United States. Colorado voters approved this constitution on July 1, 1876, three days before the Centennial of the United States. President Grant then proclaimed that the Territory of Colorado had been accepted into the US as the State of Colorado on August 1, with its 1876 constitution. The state was immediately nicknamed the "Centennial State".

When it was adopted in 1876, the constitution included a "Schedule" at the end, which laid out specific provisions for the transition of Colorado from its territorial government to its statehood.

From 1876 to 2007, the Constitution of the State of Colorado had been amended 152 times. In 2012, voters approved recreational use of marijuana via constitutional amendment. In 2018, voters approved a new set of amendments related to congressional apportionment at state and federal levels intended to reduce gerrymandering.

== Amendments ==
There are presently three ways to amend the Colorado state constitution. First, an initiative may be proposed directly by the people of Colorado, achieve a required number of signatures on a petition, and then be voted on in a state-wide referendum, in which must achieve a 55% majority in order to be adopted. Second, the state assembly may draft an amendment, approve it by a two-thirds majority vote in each house, and then send it to the voters, who must again approve it with a 55% majority in a state-wide referendum. In either of these methods, if the amendment is limited only to repealing a part of the constitution, it only needs a simple majority approval in state-wide referendum. Third, the state assembly may call a constitutional convention (political meeting) by a two-thirds majority vote in each house and simple majority approval of voters in a state-wide referendum, with members then determined by state-wide election using state senate districts, who would submit alterations to the voters to approve as a slate via simple majority.

Despite these relatively high bars to passing any given amendment, at least 166 amendments to the constitution have been passed since its initial adoption in 1876. Prior to 2016, constitutional amendments needed to only achieve a 50% majority upon state-wide referendum.

The constitution's Article II, The Bill of Rights, contains two provisions added via amendment related to sexual orientation that were found to violate the US Constitution. The first of these, Section 30b, was passed in 1992 and prohibited legislative or administrative bodies in Colorado from declaring sexual orientation a basis of protected status; this was found unconstitutional in Romer v. Evans and so is not in force. The second of these provisions, Section 31, passed as 2006 Colorado Amendment 43, effectively banned same-sex marriage. This provision was affected by three different federal cases: Kitchen v. Herbert (2014), Bishop v. Smith (2014), and Obergefell v. Hodges (2015). The last of these cases guaranteed the right to same-sex marriage in every state in the US, effectively nullifying this section. However, section 30b remains in the text of the present Colorado constitution, and has not been repealed. Amendment 43 was repealed by Colorado voters on November 5, 2024.

In 1992, voters approved an amendment creating Article X, Section 20, which established the Taxpayer Bill of Rights (TABOR). This law is a constitutional provision which intentionally limits tax increases every year, making it impossible for the Colorado legislature or other bodies to raise taxes in Colorado beyond set annual increases without explicit voter approval via referendum.

There have been at least two amendments related to congressional term limits. The first of these amendments (Article XVIII, Section 12, "Amendment 12") was made effective in December 1996 and attempted to direct Colorado's representatives to the US Congress to propose and vote for an amendment to the US constitution in support of congressional term limits. This amendment was found unconstitutional in the 1998 Colorado Supreme Court case Morrissey v. State, on the grounds that a state's voters could not compel their representatives to vote or act in a legislature in any particular way, as doing so would be contrary to the republican form of government guaranteed by the Guarantee Clause of the US Constitution. Amendment 12 was subsequently repealed in 2002, though it had not been in effect for four years. The second congressional term limit amendment (Article XVIII, Section 12a, "Amendment 18") was much reduced in scope, and instead opted to allow candidates for US Congress to sign a pledge to honor term limits to three terms in the US House of Representatives and two terms in the US Senate, with information about a candidate's pledge status appearing on the ballot next to their name. This amendment took effect on December 30, 1998.

In 2006, the constitution was amended to allow and regulate medical marijuana ("Amendment 20"). Eight years later, another amendment legalized marijuana possession and use generally ("Amendment 64"). Both of these amendments are presently contained in Article XIX of the constitution, "Miscellany". Also in 2006, "Amendment 41" was passed, creating an independent ethics commission for state officers with the intent of regulating gifts and lobbying.

=== Notable adopted amendments ===
- 1972 Denver Winter Olympics referendum, rejected hosting the 1976 Winter Olympics in Denver (removed from constitution in 1989 and 1991)
- 1974 Poundstone Amendment, regulated county annexations
- 1982 Gallagher Amendment, set forth a formula for determining property values (repealed in 2020)
- 1992 Colorado Amendment 1, "Taxpayer Bill of Rights (TABOR)", a restriction on tax increases without voter approval
- 1992 Colorado Amendment 2, prohibited protected status on the basis of sexual orientation (overturned in Romer v. Evans)
- 1996 Colorado Amendment 12, attempted to compel Colorado representatives to the US Congress to support a constitutional amendment requiring term limits (found unconstitutional in Morrissey v. State (1998))
- 1998 Colorado Amendment 18, requires candidates for US congress to either pledge to voluntarily term-limit themselves or sign a form stating that they refused to sign such a pledge
- 2006 Colorado Amendment 20, legalization of medical marijuana
- 2006 Colorado Amendment 41, established ethics commission for public officials
- 2006 Colorado Amendment 42, raised the state minimum wage to $6.85 per hour with set increases, superseded by Amendment 70 (2016)
- 2006 Colorado Amendment 43, banned same-sex marriage (overturned in Kitchen v. Herbert and Obergefell v. Hodges)
- 2008 Colorado Amendment 50, expansion of commercial gambling in Colorado
- 2008 Colorado Amendment 54, campaign finance reform (found unconstitutional in Dallman v. Ritter (2010))
- 2012 Colorado Amendment 64, legalized marijuana for personal use
- 2016 Colorado Amendment 71, changed the signature requirement for ballot initiatives and increased the amendment approval threshold from a 50% to 55% majority
- 2018 Colorado Amendment A, prohibited slavery in all circumstances, hypothetically outlawing forced penal labor
- 2018 Colorado Amendment Y, established a redistricting scheme for Colorado's US Congress districts
- 2018 Colorado Amendment Z, established a parallel redistricting scheme for the Colorado legislative assembly
- 2020 Colorado Amendment 76, restricted voting to "only citizens"
- 2020 Colorado Amendment 77, removed single-bet limits in casinos
- 2020 Colorado Amendment B, repealed the Gallagher Amendment
- 2024 Colorado Amendment 79, added provision codifying abortion rights

=== Notable proposed amendments that were not adopted ===
- 2004 Colorado Amendment 36, proposed proportional split of electoral college votes
- 2006 Colorado Amendment 38, proposed expansion of ballot measures
- 2008 Colorado Amendment 46, proposed state affirmative action provision
- 2008 Colorado Amendment 47, proposed right-to-work provision
- 2008 Colorado Amendment 48, proposed anti-abortion provision that would grant legal personhood to fertilized embryos
- 2008 Colorado Amendment 49, proposed prohibition of state employee paycheck deductions
- 2008 Colorado Amendment 52, proposed severance tax allocation
- 2008 Colorado Amendment 58, proposed severance tax allocation
- 2008 Colorado Amendment 59, proposed restructuring of taxes relating to education
- 2010 Colorado Amendment 62, proposed personhood amendment similar to Amendment 48
- 2016 Colorado Amendment 69, proposed creation of a state single-payer healthcare system
- 2020 Colorado Amendment C, proposed change in Bingo license regulations

== Outline of the Colorado Constitution ==
- Preamble
1. Article I: Boundaries
2. Article II: Bill of Rights
3. Article III: Distribution of powers
4. Article IV: Executive Department
5. Article V: Legislative Department
6. Article VI: Judicial Department
7. Article VII: Suffrage and Elections
8. Article VIII: State Institutions
9. Article IX: Education
10. Article X: Revenue
11. Article XI: Public Indebtedness
12. Article XII: Officers
13. Article XIII: Impeachments
14. Article XIV: Counties
15. Article XV: Corporations
16. Article XVI: Mining and Irrigation
17. Article XVII: Militia
18. Article XVIII: Miscellaneous
19. Article XIX: Amendments
20. Article XX: Home Rule Cities and Towns
21. Article XXI: Recall from Office
22. Article XXII: Intoxicating Liquors (Repealed)
23. Article XXIII: Publication of Legal Advertising (Repealed)
24. Article XXIV: Old Age Pensions
25. Article XXV: Public Utilities
26. Article XXVI: Nuclear Detonations
27. Article XXVII: Great Outdoors Colorado Program
28. Article XXVIII: Campaign and Political Finance
29. Article XXIX: Ethics in Government
- Schedule
- Attestation

== See also ==
- Law of Colorado
- Government of Colorado
