= 2010 Colorado Amendment 62 =

Referendum that would have banned abortion

Amendment 62
- Colorado Personhood Amendment

Results
| Choice | Votes | % |
|---|---|---|
| Yes | 509,062 | 29.47% |
| No | 1,218,490 | 70.53% |
| Valid votes | 1,727,552 | 94.95% |
| Invalid or blank votes | 91,929 | 5.05% |
| Total votes | 1,819,481 | 100.00% |
| Registered voters/turnout | 2,474,059 | 73.54% |
- County results Against 80%–90% 70%–80% 60%–70% 50%–60%

Colorado Amendment 62 was an initiated constitutional amendment that appeared on the November 2, 2010 ballot defining personhood as “every human being from the beginning of the biological development of that human being.” It sought to ban abortion in the state of Colorado and challenge Roe v. Wade.

This was the second time a Personhood amendment appeared on the Colorado ballot. Both initiatives were led by the umbrella organization Personhood USA, and both initiatives failed.

== Text of the proposal ==
The text, as it appeared on the ballot, read:

"An amendment to the Colorado Constitution applying the term 'person' as used in those provisions of the Colorado Constitution relating to inalienable rights, equality of justice and due process of law, to every human being from the beginning of the biological development of that human being."

Had it been approved, it would have amended Article II of the Colorado Constitution by adding a new section, Section 32, that would read:

"Section 32: Person defined. As used in Sections 3, 6, and 25 of Article II of the state constitution, the term “person” shall apply to every human being from the beginning of the biological development of that human being."

The amendment language was composed by Dianne Irving, a professional biochemist and biologist at Georgetown University.

== Past personhood amendment efforts ==
In 2008, Personhood USA spearheaded a campaign effort behind another personhood amendment, Amendment 48, also in Colorado. This amendment failed 73.2% to 26.8%.

== Differences Between Amendment 48 and Amendment 62 ==
The text of Amendment 62 differs slightly from that of Amendment 48. Amendment 48 defined personhood as beginning “from the moment of fertilization.” Keith Mason, founder of Personhood USA, explained they changed the wording because of concerns that including the word “fertilization” would protect human cloning.

== Support ==
Most of the support for Amendment 62 came from Colorado Right to Life and Personhood USA. In addition, a vast majority of the Republican candidates running in Colorado in 2010 voiced their support of the personhood amendment. This is in contrast to 2008, in which many of the Republican candidates were against Amendment 48.

The arguments used by supporters focused on the idea that rights were being denied to human beings who were still yet to be born. In one radio advertisement, Personhood Colorado compared fetuses being denied the status of personhood to slaves being denied the status of a full person.

== Opposition ==
Many groups opposed this amendment, including NARAL Pro-Choice Colorado, Planned Parenthood of the Rocky Mountains, Coalition for Secular Government, National Advocate for Pregnant Women, and Colorado Organization for Latina Opportunity and Reproductive Rights. Most notably, there were key religious groups in opposition to Amendment 62, including the Colorado Catholic Conference and the Interfaith Alliance of Colorado.

Opponents to Amendment 62 argued that the proposed initiative was a government intrusion into private life, that it was an attack on women's rights, and that it discouraged quality healthcare and family planning by creating a disconnect between women and their doctors. Opponents also noted that the amendment would ban in-vitro fertilization and some forms of birth control, including the morning-after pill. News columnist Ed Quillen suggested that every miscarriage would result in an investigation, since it would be a death that did not occur under medical supervision. Jeremy Shaver, executive director of the Interfaith Alliance of Colorado, said that the amendment, just like Amendment 48, was “an overt attempt to insert religion into law.”

== Election results ==
Amendment 62
| Choice | Votes | % |
|---|---|---|
| For | 509,062 | 29.47 |
| Against | 1,218,490 | 70.53 |
| Total | 1,727,552 | 100.00 |
