= Poundstone =

Poundstone may refer to:

- Derek Poundstone, American professional strongman
- Paula Poundstone, American comedian
- William Poundstone, American author
- Freda Poundstone, Colorado politician and lobbyist, and drafter of the Poundstone Amendment
- Homer Poundstone, a US Navy Lieutenant Commander in the 1900s, see South Carolina-class battleship
