= California Coastal Trail =

Long-distance hiking trail in the United States

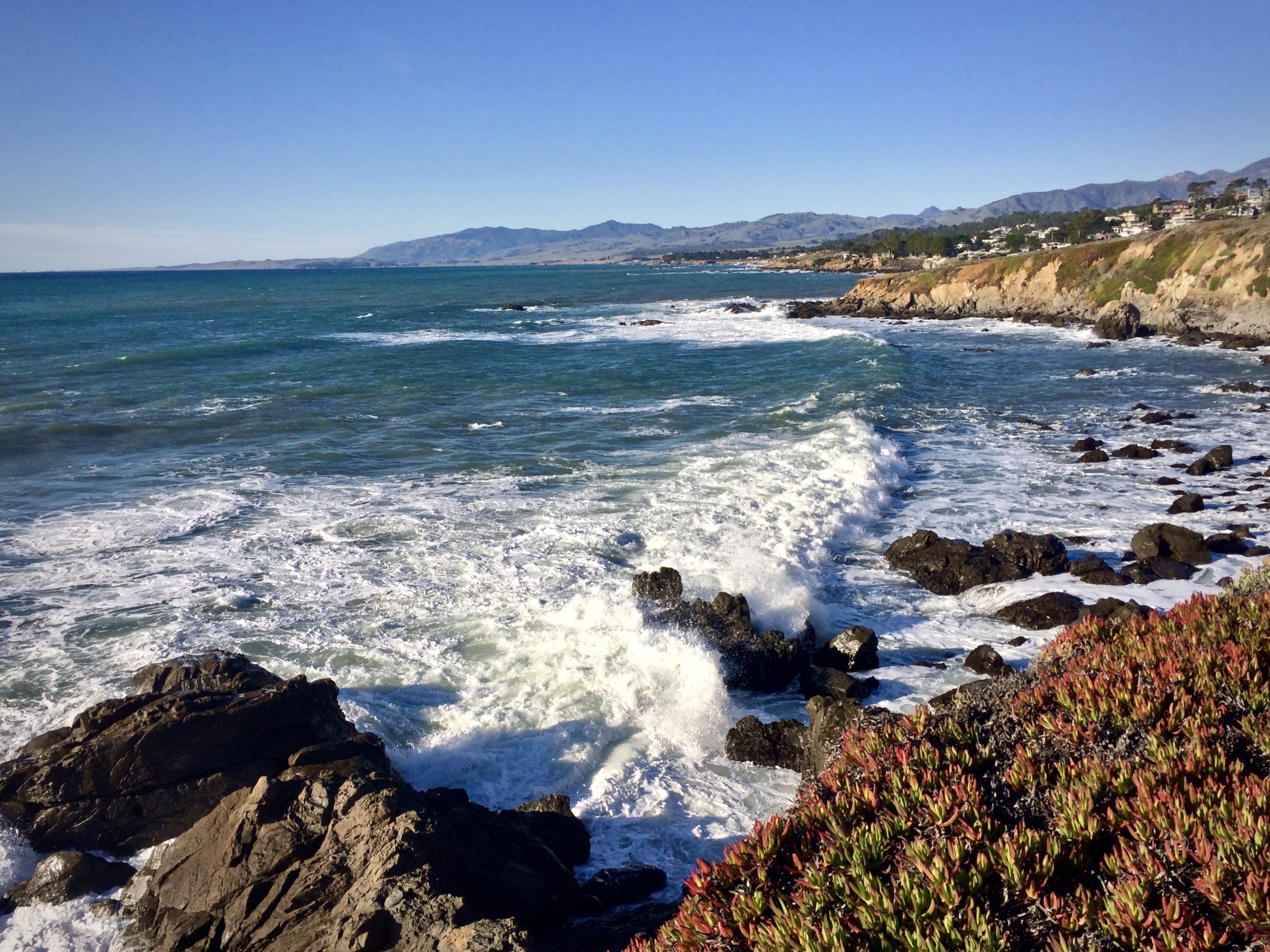
- California Coastal Trail in Cambria looking north up the coast, towards other segments of the trail in State Parks
- Use: Hiking, biking, equestrianism
- Website: Official website

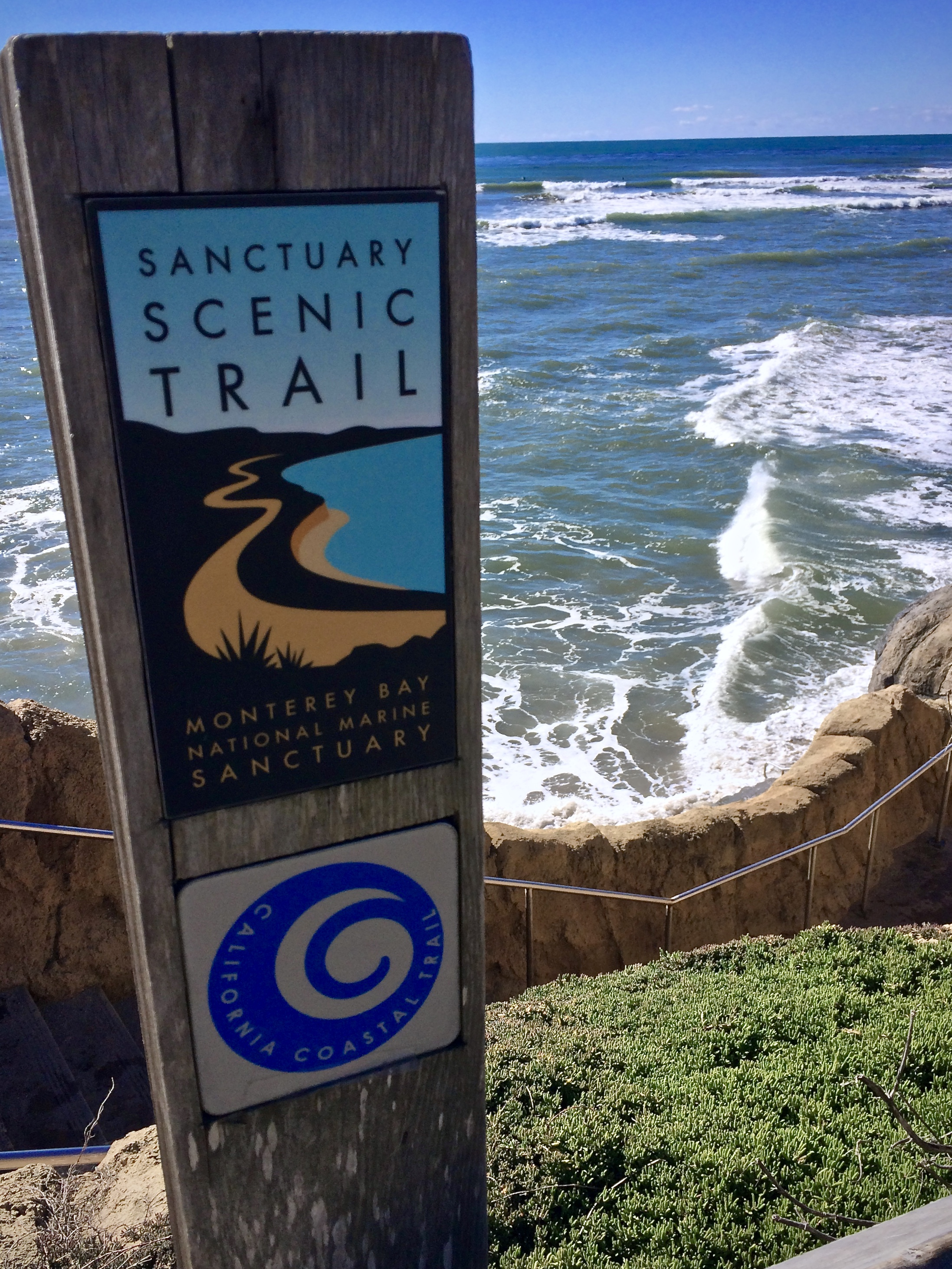
Trail sign for California Coastal Trail near Capitola, California.

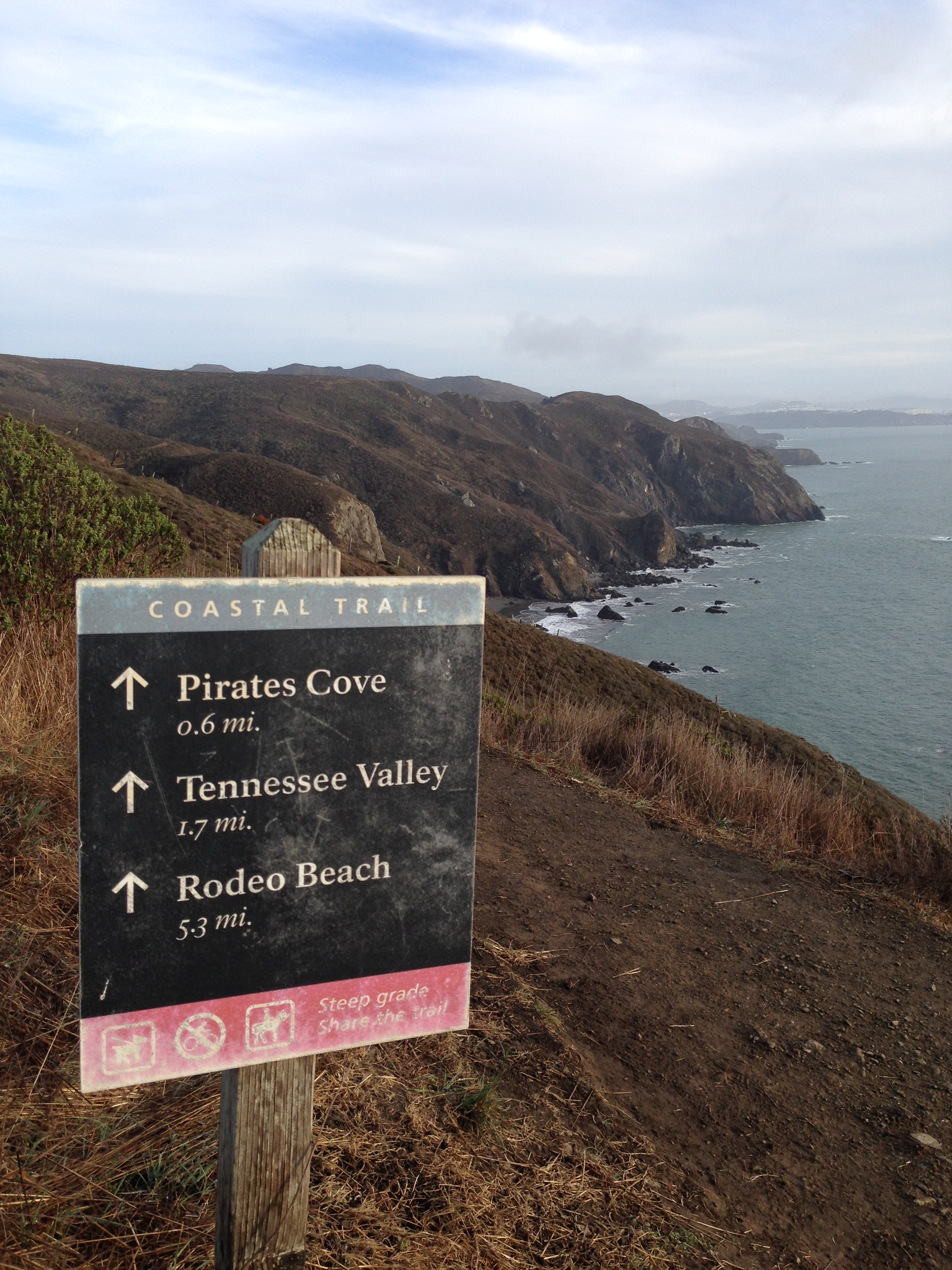
Sign on the California Coastal Trail South of Muir Beach

The California Coastal Trail, or CCT, is an environmental project by the California Coastal Conservancy, an organization developed to enhance coastal resources and promote access to the shore in 2001.

The trail is designed to connect the entire coast of California by forming an extensive multi-use trail. When complete, the trail will be 1,200 miles (1,900 km) long—spanning from Oregon to Mexico. As of January 2017, the trail is about 30 percent complete with signage (60 percent with mixed or no signage) and expenses are predicted to reach $668m when finished.

"The California Coastal Trail will not be one single pathway that connects the entire coastline. It will consist of different, and approximately parallel trails that accommodate the needs of varying visitors. Some portions of the trail will be for beach walkers, and other sections will be for bicyclists and equestrians. The trail will also have paths to detour around seasonal nesting grounds or other sensitive sites. Though the paths may not all be physically connected, whenever possible all trails will be “within sight, sound, or at least the scent of the sea."

A two-volume trail guide has been written about the California Coastal Trail entitled Hiking the California Coastal Trail.

== History ==
Exploration of portions of the California coast by Europeans began in 1769. The Portola Expedition was the first European group to explore the coast in southern California, and the de Anza expeditions followed the Portola Expedition soon after. The paths the expeditions took are now commemorated in the Juan Bautista de Anza National Historic Trail. The Juan Bautista trail shares a portion of its route with the Coastal Trail.

The Coastal Initiative stating that “A hiking, bicycle, and equestrian trails system shall be established along or near the coast” and that “ideally the trails system should be continuous and located near the shoreline” was passed in 1972 with 55% popular vote. Policy makers and coastal managers have envisioned a continuous coastal trail in California for generations. Governor Gray Davis and the White House Millennium Trail Council designated the California Coastal Trail as California's Millennium Legacy Trail in 1999. Due to its new recognition, federal agencies began to aid in the development of the trail. In 2001, state legislation approved the completion of the trail, which led to its designation as a state trail. In 2001, the State Coastal Conservancy was directed to provide the specifications needed to complete the coastal trail and their report came out in 2003. Activity on the project since 2003 is listed in the "What's New" section on the California Coastal Trail website.

== Goals ==
The California Coastal Conservancy has six goals for the California Coastal Trail, to:

1. Provide a continuous trail as close to the ocean as possible
2. Have full support of the state
3. Better public knowledge of the good that comes with the California Coastal Trail
4. Have all policies related to the trail respect the rights of private landowners (SB 908 Report 8)
5. Design the trail to create positive experiences for the public while protecting the environment
6. Have the trail connect to other trail systems to provide ways to the coastal area from urban areas

The conservancy expects the trail to improve the economy. The trail will attract tourists, create jobs, and make selling surrounding real estate easier. They expect the trail to help protect the environment. People enjoying nature can do so without hurting sensitive areas if they stay on the trail. Another goal is to improve quality of life through recreation by encouraging people to use the trail for exercise. Finally, the conservancy wants people to think of trails as a means of transportation (SB 908 Report 9). To achieve these goals the trail must meet four requirements—it must:

- Always be within sight or sound of the ocean
- Serve as a starting point to reach various destinations
- Be separated from all motor traffic
- Respect the current environment and not disrupt the natural habitat

== Challenges ==
Completing the California Coastal Trail requires resolving issues that include environmental protection, private and quasi-public ownership of lands along the shoreline, and cooperation among many agencies and individuals.

The coastal environment is fragile, and the trail must not threaten natural habitat. The coast is home to endangered species such as the California least tern, and has fragile tide pools, beaches visited by elephant seals to bear and raise their pups, and areas of sensitive vegetation. The trail aims to prevent people from entering sensitive sites, yet still bring visitors within view of other sights to educate them on the shoreline ecosystem. Trail developers believe that informing people spreads the idea of respecting and protecting the environment.

Over the years, people have built many structures too close to the shoreline. As a result, they became threatened by the ocean's force, and owners built revetments as a defense. However, the armoring has severely narrowed some beaches. Public access to the beaches has also been reduced in areas where development exists in an unbroken line contiguous to the beach. Properties act as barriers to the public by preventing entrance to the shore. Vertical access is also restricted, stopping public roads leading to the shoreline.

Coastal land ownership is divided among many individuals, companies, and organizations. To unify the trail, developers of the California Coastal Trail must ask all owners to cooperate. Several agencies—state, community, and federal—along with quasi-public land-holders must communicate and discover ways to increase coastline access.

== Implementation ==
Fifteen projects are being worked on along the California coastline in the counties of Del Norte, Humboldt, Mendocino, Sonoma, Marin, San Francisco, San Mateo, Santa Cruz, Monterey, San Luis Obispo, Santa Barbara, Ventura, Los Angeles, Orange County, and San Diego. The conservancy is also encouraging the state to implement five statewide policies. The first is making a formal commitment to completing the trail by promising funding for the trail that would continue after completion for maintenance and repair. The second is to include the California Coastal Trail into state transportation by incorporating it into the current transportation improvement program. The conservancy also suggests that the state increase its focus on improving the non-motorized transportation area safety. Third, the state should adopt the trail into the State Outdoor Recreation Plan and evaluate its accessibility to children, seniors, and those with disabilities. Fourth, the conservancy thinks all state programs should help complete the project. Finally, the state should remove or redesign any artificial object that impedes the public's access to the shoreline.

=== Funding ===
For planning the Coastal Trail, the Coastal Conservancy awarded Coastwalk a $600,000 grant in 2000. The state is giving approximately 1 million dollars from the remaining funds of Proposition 12 to California State parks to employ the Conservation Corps. Planners are encouraging legislators and the public to raise $350 million more to complete the trail. As a Millennium Legacy Trail, the California Coastal trail received a $10,000 grant from American Express Company.

== See also ==
- California Department of Parks and Recreation
- California Coastal Commission
- California Coastal Conservancy
- California Coastal National Monument
- List of California Beaches
- Oregon Coast Trail
