= Dennis Gallagher =

Dennis Gallagher may refer to:

- Dennis J. Gallagher (1939–2022), American politician in Colorado
- Dennis P. Gallagher (born 1963), American politician in New York
- Dennis Gallagher (Massachusetts politician)

== See also ==
- Denis Gallagher (1922–2001), Irish politician
