= Abortion in Colorado =

2024 Colorado Amendment 79 results map by county

Abortion in Colorado is legal at all stages of pregnancy. It is one of seven states without any term restrictions as to when a pregnancy can be terminated.

Outpatient abortion is available up to 26 weeks. In addition, medically indicated termination of pregnancy up to term is also an option for conditions such as fetal anomalies, genetic disorder, fetal demise and/or severe medical problems.

2024 Colorado Amendment 79 appeared on the ballot in November 2024. The amendment was approved, explicitly conferring a right to abortion in the Colorado state constitution.

== History ==
In 1962, the American Law Institute published their model penal code as it applied to abortions with three circumstances where they believed a physician could justifiably perform an abortion. A version of this was enacted into law in 1967. Colorado became the first state to decriminalize abortion in cases of rape, incest, or in which pregnancy would lead to permanent physical disability of the woman.

=== Early abortion law ===
Colorado became a territory in 1861, and its General Laws included a ban on abortion:

"[E]very person who shall administer substance or liquid, or who shall use or cause to be used any instrument, of whatsoever kind, with the intention to procure the miscarriage of any woman then being with child, and shall thereof be duly convicted, shall be imprisoned for a term not exceeding three years, and fined in a sum not exceeding one thousand dollars; and if any woman, by reason of such treatment, shall die, the person or persons administering, or causing to be administered, such poison, substance or liquid, or using or causing to be used, any instrument, as aforesaid, shall be deemed guilty of manslaughter, and if convicted, be punished accordingly."

The first documented time "abortion" was mentioned in Colorado newspapers was in the Rocky Mountain News on September 30, 1867. Back then, midwives used herbs to try to end pregnancies, but this could be very dangerous. The first documented arrest for abortion is J. H. Murphy in Denver in 1868, and Dr. Mary Solander from Boulder was the first person sentenced to prison for abortion in 1873.

=== Abortion law reform ===
In 1891, Colorado adopted Senate Bill 310, which further criminalized procuring an abortion. In the early 1900s, newspapers reported more cases of doctors being charged. In 1909, osteopaths were prohibited from performing abortions.

In 1929, the Colorado Assembly tried to make it legal for doctors to talk to married couples about birth control. But this law was killed in the Colorado Senate after heated debate. The proposed law was a partial repeal of the 1873 Comstock Act that made it illegal to distribute birth control materials.

In 1962, the American Law Institute published their model penal code, as it applied to abortions, with three circumstances where they believed a physician could justifiably perform an abortion: "If ... there is substantial risk that the continuance of the pregnancy would gravely impair the physical or mental health of the mother, or that the child would be born with grave physical or mental defect, or that the pregnancy resulted from rape, incest, or other felonious intercourse." In 1967, Colorado became the first state to apply this into law, followed by Arkansas, California, Georgia, Maryland, New Mexico, North Carolina, and Oregon. Specifically, the new law permitted an abortion in cases of rape, incest, fetal abnormality, and to protect the life of the mother. However, it was only up to 16 weeks of pregnancy and required the husband's permission and approval from three doctors. Over 33 months, 1,500 Colorado women obtained legal abortions, while around 20,000 sought illegal abortions because of the costs and red tape.

In 1969, lawmakers failed to pass a bill that would have removed liability for a doctor or hospital refusing to perform an abortion.

=== Abortion access and legal battles ===
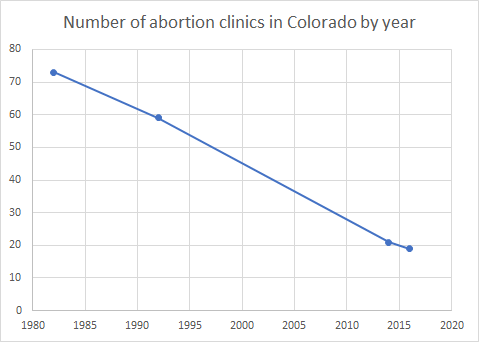
Number of abortion clinics in Colorado by year

In 1973, the US Supreme Court's decision in Roe v. Wade ruling meant the state could no longer regulate abortion in the first trimester.

In the period between 1972 and 1974, there were zero recorded illegal abortion deaths in the state. During the winter of 1978, three women in less than a month required hospitalization in Denver after consuming pennyroyal oil for the purpose of trying to induce an abortion. One of these women died.

In 1978, Colorado set up Medicaid funding to help poor women get abortions. In 1979, a bill to ban public funding of abortions failed. In 1984, voters approved a similar constitutional amendment.

Between 1982 and 1992, the number of abortion clinics in the state decreased by fourteen, going from 73 in 1982 to 59 in 1992.

In 1993, Colorado enacted speech restrictions within 100 feet of abortion clinics, a policy the U.S. Supreme Court affirmed in Hill v. Colorado in 2000.

Colorado Republicans introduced numerous bills to ban or restrict abortion in almost all cases, beginning in 1997 and continuing through 2025. These bills did not pass due to Democratic opposition. In 2025, proposed bills backed by Republicans to ban abortion and prosecute women that had abortions were defeated.

In 1998, Becky Bell's parents worked against proposed parental notification laws in Colorado.

In 2006, pharmacists in Colorado were allowed to provide emergency contraception. In 2008, Colorado's Department of Public Health and Environment was provided with private funds to provide poor women in the state with long-acting reversible contraceptives (LARCs) at little or no cost to them. From 2009 to 2017, free, low-cost IUDs resulted in a 54% decline in the rate of teenage pregnancy in the state.

In 2014, there were 21 abortion clinics in the state, and 78% of the counties in the state did not have an abortion clinic. That year, 27% of women in the state aged 15 – 44 lived in a county without an abortion clinic.

In 2008, Kristine Burton and Michael Burton of Colorado for Equal Rights jointly proposed the Colorado Amendment 48 initiative. Colorado Right to Life supported the amendment. There was bipartisan opposition. The text would have amended the definition of a person to "any human being from the moment of fertilization". This definition would have applied to all sections of Colorado law, thus giving a fetus the equal rights of life, liberty, and property as a fully developed, born person would. On November 4, 2008, the initiative was turned down by 73.2 percent of the voters.

Amendment 48
Choice	Votes	%
For	618,761	26.79
Against	1,691,165	73.21
Total	2,309,926	100.00

Colorado Proposition 115 was a 2020 ballot initiative preventing abortion after 22 weeks unless the pregnancy endangered the mother's life. Performing an abortion after 22 weeks would have become a Class 1 misdemeanor. On November 3, 2020, Colorado voters rejected Proposition 115, with 59% of voters opposed to the initiative.

Proposition 115
Choice	Votes	%
For	1,292,787	41.01
Against	1,859,479	58.99
Total	3,152,266	100.00

In March 2016, there were 21 Planned Parenthood clinics in the state. After Planned Parenthood of the Rocky Mountains switched from directly billing women to directly billing Medicaid in 2016, it ran into funding bills as Medicaid has low reimbursement rates. Consequently, it was forced to close two clinics in Colorado and one in Wyoming in July 2017. In 2017, there were nineteen Planned Parenthood clinics, of which eleven offered abortion services, in a state with a population of 1,278,937 women aged 15–49.

In 2019, women in Colorado were eligible for temporary disability as a result of abortion or miscarriage.

On April 4, 2022, Governor Jared Polis signed the Reproductive Health Equity Act, which guarantees access to reproductive care and affirms the rights of pregnant women to continue or terminate a pregnancy. The act prohibits public entities from restricting or denying those rights. The Supreme Court overturned Roe v. Wade in Dobbs v. Jackson Women's Health Organization, No. 19-1392, 597 U.S. ___ (2022) later in 2022.

On April 18, 2024, Coloradans For Protecting Reproductive Freedom submitted nearly double the signatures required to put abortion rights on the ballot in Colorado in the November 2024 elections. 2024 Colorado Amendment 79 enshrined the right to abortion in the Colorado state constitution.

== Statistics ==
59% of adults said in a 2014 Pew Research Center poll that abortion should be legal in all or most cases and 36% said it should be illegal in all or most cases. The 2023 American Values Atlas reported that, in their most recent survey, 65% of Coloradans said that abortion should be legal in all or most cases.

In 1990, 426,000 women in the state faced the risk of an unintended pregnancy. Since the start of the 2008 Colorado Family Planning Initiative, the number of abortions performed in the state fell by nearly half for women between the ages of 15–19. For women aged 20–24, the rate of abortions declined by 18%. For teens aged 15–19, the birth and abortion rate in Colorado between 2009 and 2014 declined around 50%. For women aged 20–24, the abortion rate declined by 20%. In 2010, the state had no publicly funded abortions. In 2013, there were 700 abortions for white women aged 15–19, 110 abortions for black women aged 15–19, 470 abortions for Hispanic women aged 15–19, and 90 abortions for women of all other races.

In 2014, 59% of adults said in a poll by the Pew Research Center that abortion should be legal and 36% saying it should be illegal in all or most cases. In 2017, the state had an infant mortality rate of 4.5 deaths per 1,000 live births. From 2009 to 2017, the rate of teenage abortions in the state fell by 64%.

Number of reported abortions, abortion rate and percentage change in rate by geographic region and state in 1992, 1995 and 1996
Census division and state	Number			Rate			% change 1992–1996
Census division and state	1992	1995	1996	1992	1995	1996	% change 1992–1996
US Total	1,528,930	1,363,690	1,365,730	25.9	22.9	22.9	–12
Mountain	69,600	63,390	67,020	21	17.9	18.6	–12
Arizona	20,600	18,120	19,310	24.1	19.1	19.8	–18
Colorado	19,880	15,690	18,310	23.6	18	20.9	–12
Idaho	1,710	1,500	1,600	7.2	5.8	6.1	–15
Montana	3,300	3,010	2,900	18.2	16.2	15.6	–14
Nevada	13,300	15,600	15,450	44.2	46.7	44.6	1
New Mexico	6,410	5,450	5,470	17.7	14.4	14.4	–19
Utah	3,940	3,740	3,700	9.3	8.1	7.8	–16
Wyoming	460	280	280	4.3	2.7	2.7	–37

Number, rate, and ratio of reported abortions, by reporting area of residence and occurrence and by percentage of abortions obtained by out-of-state residents, US CDC estimates
Location	Residence			Occurrence			% obtained by out-of-state residents	Year	Ref
Location	No.	Rate^	Ratio^^	No.	Rate^	Ratio^^	% obtained by out-of-state residents	Year	Ref
Colorado				19,880	23.6				
Colorado				15,690	18				
Colorado				18,310	20.9				
Colorado	9,453	8.7	144	10,648	9.8	162	11.3	2014	
Colorado	8,975	8.1	135	10,114	9.1	152	11.3	2015	
Colorado	7,363	6.6	111	8,333	7.4	125	11.4	2016	
^number of abortions per 1,000 women aged 15–44; ^^number of abortions per 1,000 live births

== Abortion rights views and activities ==
=== Politics ===
In state politics, the Colorado Democratic Party largely support access to abortion and have passed legislation to protect and increase the accessibility of the procedure.

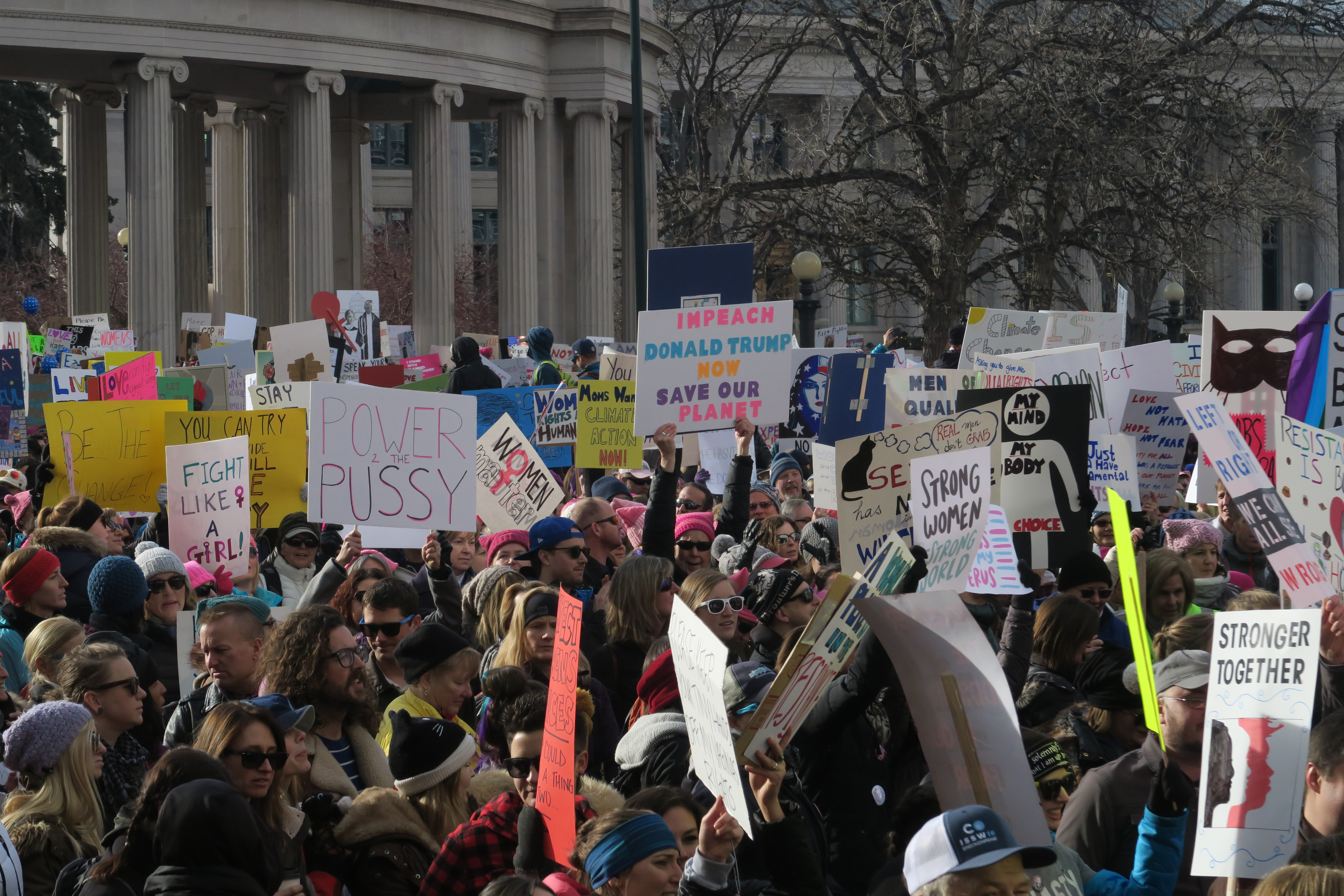
Women's March In Denver in 2017

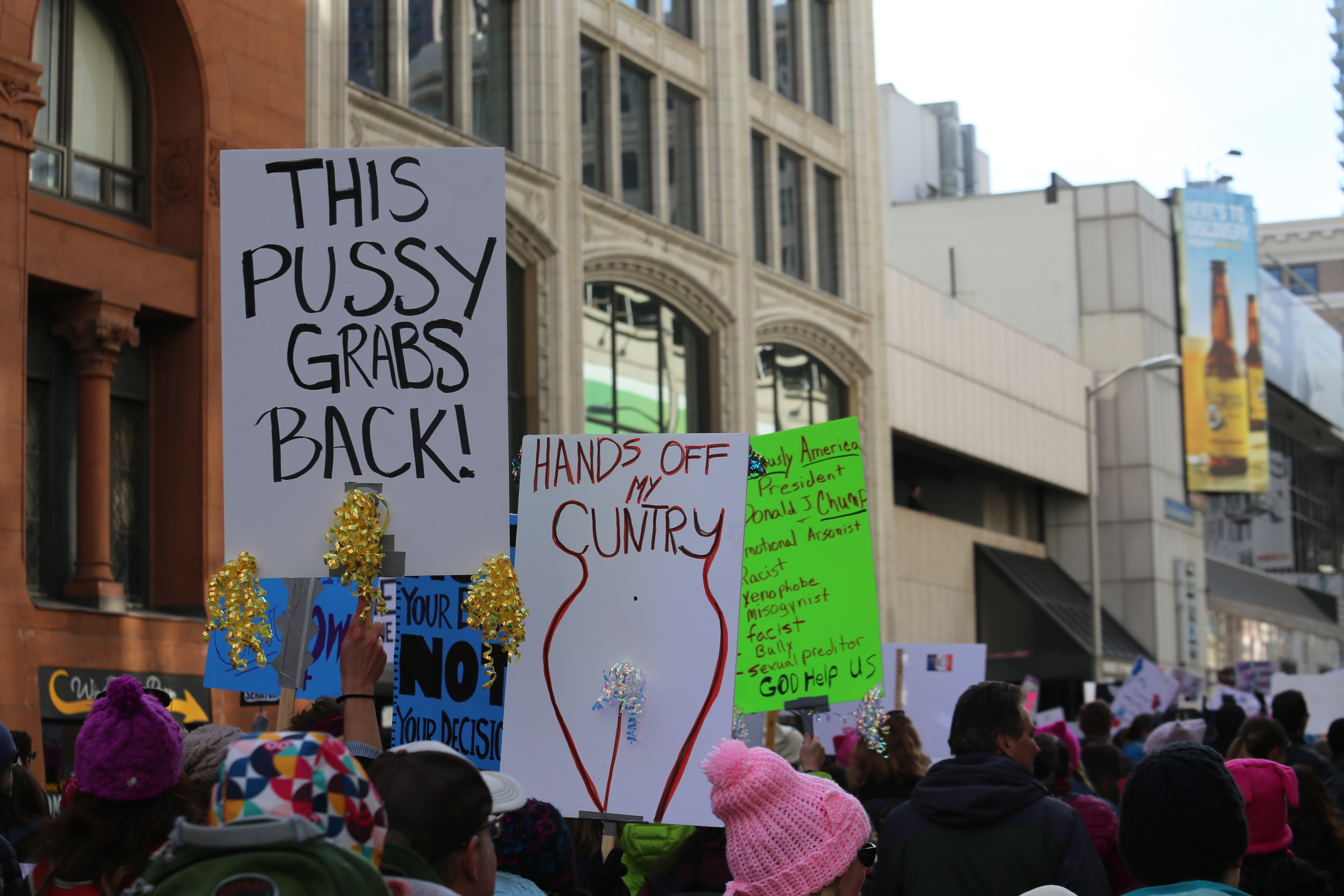
Women's March In Denver in 2017

=== Protests ===
Women from the state participated in marches supporting abortion rights as part of a #StoptheBans movement in May 2019.

Following the Roe v. Wade overturn draft leak on May 2, 2022, there were abortion rights demonstrations in Aspen, Colorado Springs, Denver, Fort Collins, and Grand Junction.

Following the overturn of Roe v. Wade on June 24, 2022, an abortion rights protest was held outside the Colorado State Capitol in Denver.

== Anti-abortion views and activities ==
=== Politics ===
In state politics, the Colorado Republican Party has embraced hardline anti-abortion stances which have included proposing laws to restrict or even ban abortion in the state.

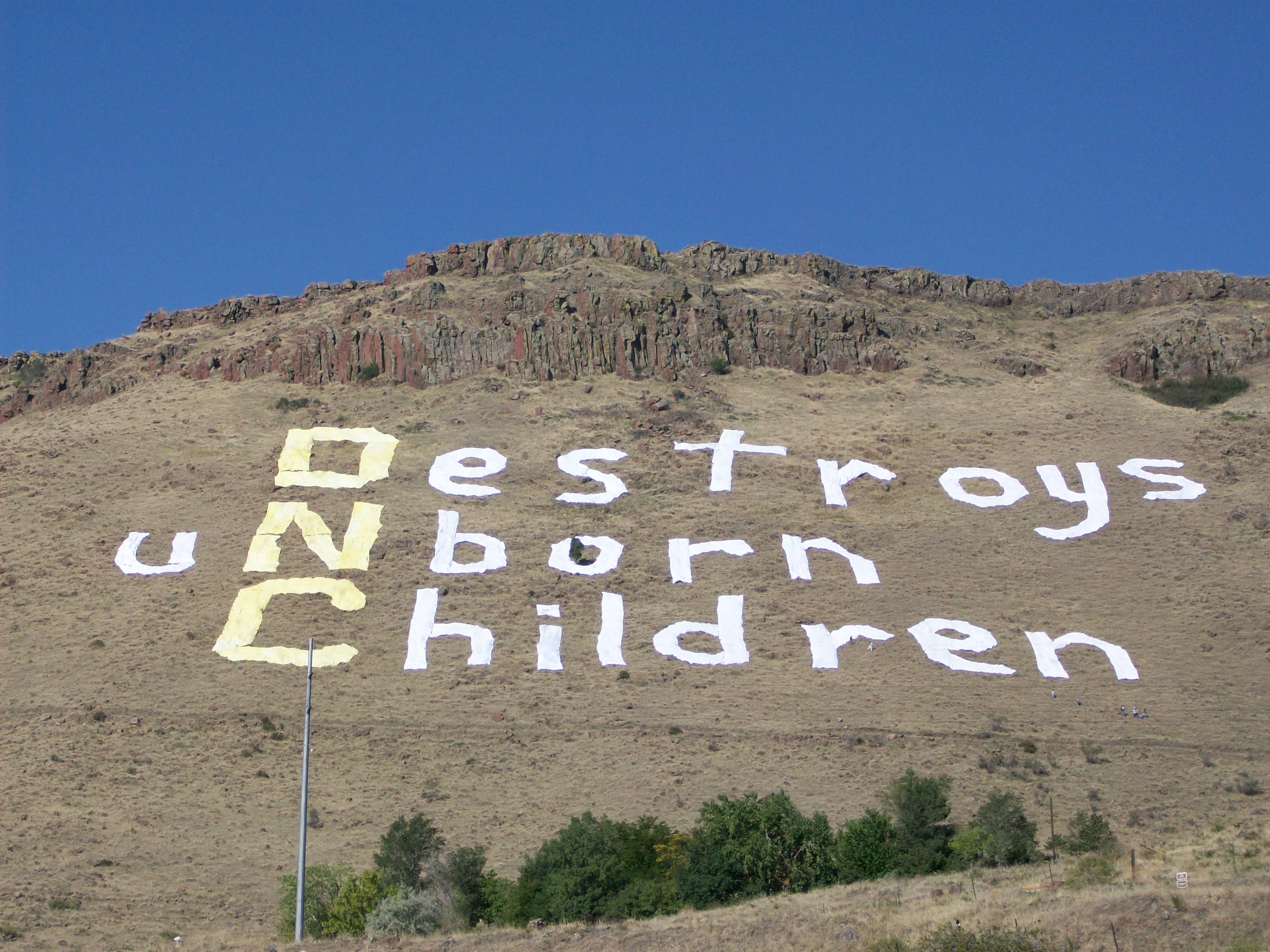
Abortion protest sign on North Table Mountain outside Denver, during the 2008 Democratic National Convention. The sign reads "Destroys uNborn Children", and is made of sheets sewn together. It was a new Guinness World Record for largest protest sign. The sign was constructed by American Right To Life Action.

=== Protests ===
Several hundred anti-abortion activists participate in the Rocky Mountain March for Life in Colorado each year to support ending abortion.

Respect Life Denver also organizes an annual rally and march in the state capitol each year to support legislation against abortion.

Since 2024, there has been increased reports of anti-abortion protestors trespassing, threatening and obstructing access to abortion clinics.

=== Anti-abortion city ordinances ===
In late 2022, four out of seven council members of the city of Pueblo voted to consider a measure that would ban abortion within the city. The proposed ordinance was the work of a Texas-based anti-abortion group which was introduced by council member Regina Maestri. The proposed measure would break state laws surrounding abortion protections while observers said the measure might inspire other cities or towns throughout Colorado to attempt to ban or restrict abortions. The measure was narrowly rejected by the council.

In October 2024, there was another attempt to ban abortion in Pueblo by conservative council members. The measure was again narrowly defeated.

=== Violence ===
An incident of anti-abortion violence occurred at an abortion clinic in Denver, Colorado on August 26, 2003.

Between 1993 and 2015, 11 people were killed at American abortion clinics. On November 29, 2015, a shooting at a Planned Parenthood clinic in Colorado Springs, Colorado, left three dead and several injured, and a suspect, Robert L. Dear, was apprehended. Police officer and pastor Garrett Swasey, US Iraq War veteran Ke'Arre M. Stewart, and Hawaiian Jennifer Markovsky, who was accompanying a friend at the clinic, were killed. The suspect had previously acted against other clinics, and referred to himself as a "warrior for the babies" at his hearing. Neighbors and former neighbors described the suspect as "reclusive", and police from several states where the suspect resided described a history of run-ins dating from at least 1997. On May 11, 2016, the court declared the suspect incompetent to stand trial after a mental evaluation was completed.
