= CRTL =

CRTL may refer to:

- Lycopene beta-cyclase, an enzyme
- Colorado Right to Life, an American anti-abortion group
