= 2024 Colorado Amendment 79 =

Amendment to the Colorado Constitution

Amendment 79
- November 5, 2024
- Constitutional Right to Abortion

Results
| Choice | Votes | % |
|---|---|---|
| Yes | 1,921,593 | 61.97% |
| No | 1,179,261 | 38.03% |
| Total votes | 3,100,854 | 100.00% |

Yes
90–100%
80–90%
70–80%
60–70%
50–60%
No
90–100%
80–90%
70–80%
60–70%
50–60%
Other
Tie
No votes

2024 Colorado Amendment 79 was a constitutional amendment that appeared on the November 5, 2024, ballot. The amendment established a right to Abortion in Colorado in its constitution, and repealed a constitutional ban on public funding for abortions. The amendment passed, surpassing the 55% supermajority vote required for the amendment to be approved.

== Text ==
In the Colorado Constitution, Article II is amended by the addition of a new section 32 as follows:

The right to abortion is hereby recognized. Government shall not deny, impede, or discriminate against the exercise of that right, including prohibiting health insurance coverage for abortion.

== Background ==
=== Colorado's abortion laws ===
In the 19th century, bans by state legislatures on abortion were about protecting the life of the mother given the number of deaths caused by abortions; state governments saw themselves as looking out for the lives of their citizens. Colorado's first ban on abortion was passed in 1861. It read:

“[E]very person who shall administer substance or liquid, or who shall use or cause to be used any instrument, of whatsoever kind, with the intention to procure the miscarriage of any woman then being with child, and shall thereof be duly convicted, shall be imprisoned for a term not exceeding three years, and fined in a sum not exceeding one thousand dollars; and if any woman, by reason of such treatment, shall die, the person or persons administering, or causing to be administered, such poison, substance or liquid, or using or causing to be used, any instrument, as aforesaid, shall be deemed guilty of manslaughter, and if convicted, be punished accordingly.”

In 1967, Colorado decriminalized abortions in cases of rape, incest, or in which a pregnant woman would be permanently disabled as a result. Despite adopting what was considered a more progressive law, elective abortions were still illegal under state law.

=== 1984 Colorado Amendment 3 ===
In 1984, Colorado voters narrowly approved Amendment 3. The amendment effectively banned the usage of public funding for abortions except in certain circumstances. The amendment, which is still a part of the Constitution of Colorado, reads:

"No public funds shall be used by the State of Colorado, its agencies or political subdivisions, to pay, or otherwise reimburse, either directly or indirectly, any person, agency, or facility for the performance of any induced abortion, PROVIDED HOWEVER, that the General Assembly, by specific bill, may authorize, and appropriate, funds to be used for those medical services necessary to prevent the death of either a pregnant woman or her unborn child under circumstances where every reasonable effort is made to preserve the life of each."

=== Ballot measure submission ===
In 2023, Coloradans for Protecting Reproductive Freedom, the group sponsoring the initiative, filed the amendment with Jena Griswold, the Colorado Secretary of State. The measure was approved for circulation on November 14, 2023. On April 18, 2024, the group submitted some 225,000 signatures, well over the 124,238 needed to gain ballot access. Griswold certified the signatures on May 17, 2024.

== Endorsements ==
Yes

U.S. Senators

- Michael Bennet, U.S. Senator from Colorado (2009–present) (Democrat)
- John Hickenlooper, U.S. Senator from Colorado (2021–present) (Democrat)

Statewide officials

- Phil Weiser, 39th Attorney General of Colorado (2019–present) (Democrat)
- Dave Young, 57th Treasurer of Colorado (2019–present) (Democrat)

U.S. Representatives

- Diana DeGette, U.S. representative from CO-1 (1997–present) (Democrat)
- Joe Neguse, U.S. representative from CO-2 (2019–present) (Democrat)
- Jason Crow, U.S. representative from CO-6 (2019–present) (Democrat)
- Brittany Pettersen, U.S. representative from CO-7 (2023–present) (Democrat)
- Yadira Caraveo, U.S. representative from CO-8 (2023–2025) (Democrat)

State Senators

- 19 Democratic state senators

State Representatives

- 31 Democratic state representatives

Labor unions

- Colorado Education Association
- CWA Local 7799
- SEIU Local 105
- UCW-CWA 7799

Organizations

- Advocates for Youth
- ACLU of Colorado
- American College of Obstetricians and Gynecologists
- Anti-Defamation League Mountain States
- Catholics for Choice
- Center for Reproductive Rights
- Colorado Democratic Party
- Colorado Working Families Party
- Feminist Majority Foundation
- Freedom From Religion Foundation
- League of Women Voters of Colorado
- National Abortion Federation
- National Council of Jewish Women
- National Women's Law Center
- Planned Parenthood Rocky Mountains
- Reproductive Health Access Project
- SIECUS
- Small Business Majority
No

State Representatives

- Brandi Bradley, state representative from the 39th district (2023–present) (Republican)

Organizations

- Colorado Catholic Conference
- Colorado Republican Party
- March for Life

== Polling ==
| Date of opinion poll | Conducted by | Sample size (Note: Key: A – all adults RV – registered voters LV – likely voters V – unclear) | Margin of error | In favor | Against | Undecided |
|---|---|---|---|---|---|---|
| October 28–30, 2024 | Keating Research | 600 (LV) | ± 4.0% | 60% | 32% | 8% |
| October 18–30, 2024 | YouGov | 754 (LV) | ± 4.54% | 58% | 32% | 10% |

== Results ==
Amendment 79
| Choice | Votes | % |
|---|---|---|
| For | 1,921,593 | 61.97 |
| Against | 1,179,261 | 38.03 |
| Total | 3,100,854 | 100.00 |

=== By county ===
| County | For | | Against | | Margin | | Total votes cast |
| County | # | % | # | % | # | % | Total votes cast |
|---|---|---|---|---|---|---|---|
| Adams | 137,794 | 62.01% | 84,405 | 37.99% | 53,389 | 24.03% | 222,199 |
| Alamosa | 3,615 | 50.99% | 3,475 | 49.01% | 140 | 1.97% | 7,090 |
| Arapahoe | 206,611 | 65.36% | 109,490 | 34.64% | 97,121 | 30.72% | 316,101 |
| Archuleta | 4,625 | 51.59% | 4,340 | 48.41% | 285 | 3.18% | 8,965 |
| Baca | 472 | 24.62% | 1,445 | 75.38% | -973 | -50.76% | 1,917 |
| Bent | 883 | 41.77% | 1,231 | 58.23% | -348 | -16.46% | 2,114 |
| Boulder | 153,538 | 80.43% | 37,361 | 19.57% | 116,177 | 60.86% | 190,899 |
| Broomfield | 31,547 | 68.98% | 14,185 | 31.02% | 17,362 | 37.96% | 45,732 |
| Chaffee | 8,864 | 62.83% | 5,244 | 37.17% | 3,620 | 25.66% | 14,108 |
| Cheyenne | 217 | 21.11% | 811 | 78.89% | -594 | -57.78% | 1,028 |
| Clear Creek | 3,963 | 67.04% | 1,948 | 32.96% | 2,015 | 34.09% | 5,911 |
| Conejos | 1,526 | 38.26% | 2,462 | 61.74% | -936 | -23.47% | 3,988 |
| Costilla | 1,097 | 56.11% | 858 | 43.89% | 239 | 12.23% | 1,955 |
| Crowley | 613 | 36.95% | 1,046 | 63.05% | -433 | -26.10% | 1,659 |
| Custer | 1,528 | 40.38% | 2,256 | 59.62% | -728 | -19.24% | 3,784 |
| Delta | 8,124 | 42.76% | 10,877 | 57.24% | -2,753 | -14.49% | 19,001 |
| Denver | 283,105 | 80.80% | 67,286 | 19.20% | 215,819 | 61.59% | 350,391 |
| Dolores | 505 | 37.16% | 854 | 62.84% | -349 | -25.68% | 1,359 |
| Douglas | 129,390 | 54.49% | 108,063 | 45.51% | 21,327 | 8.98% | 237,453 |
| Eagle | 19,284 | 71.67% | 7,623 | 28.33% | 11,661 | 43.34% | 26,907 |
| El Paso | 193,839 | 51.98% | 179,080 | 48.02% | 14,759 | 3.96% | 372,919 |
| Elbert | 7,346 | 36.87% | 12,580 | 63.13% | -5,234 | -26.27% | 19,926 |
| Fremont | 10,907 | 43.67% | 14,067 | 56.33% | -3,160 | -12.65% | 24,974 |
| Garfield | 17,948 | 60.73% | 11,605 | 39.27% | 6,343 | 21.46% | 29,553 |
| Gilpin | 2,656 | 65.79% | 1,381 | 34.21% | 1,275 | 31.58% | 4,037 |
| Grand | 5,805 | 59.86% | 3,893 | 40.14% | 1,912 | 19.72% | 9,698 |
| Gunnison | 7,668 | 71.91% | 2,996 | 28.09% | 4,672 | 43.81% | 10,664 |
| Hinsdale | 322 | 54.67% | 267 | 45.33% | 55 | 9.34% | 589 |
| Huerfano | 2,327 | 54.08% | 1,976 | 45.92% | 351 | 8.16% | 4,303 |
| Jackson | 330 | 41.10% | 473 | 58.90% | -143 | -17.81% | 803 |
| Jefferson | 232,101 | 65.38% | 122,900 | 34.62% | 109,201 | 30.76% | 355,001 |
| Kiowa | 238 | 28.85% | 587 | 71.15% | -349 | -42.30% | 825 |
| Kit Carson | 980 | 27.54% | 2,579 | 72.46% | -1,599 | -44.93% | 3,559 |
| La Plata | 23,314 | 67.21% | 11,373 | 32.79% | 11,941 | 34.43% | 34,687 |
| Lake | 2,555 | 67.40% | 1,236 | 32.60% | 1,319 | 34.79% | 3,791 |
| Larimer | 140,284 | 64.09% | 78,593 | 35.91% | 61,691 | 28.19% | 218,877 |
| Las Animas | 3,828 | 51.10% | 3,663 | 48.90% | 165 | 2.20% | 7,491 |
| Lincoln | 847 | 33.68% | 1,668 | 66.32% | -821 | -32.64% | 2,515 |
| Logan | 3,448 | 34.96% | 6,416 | 65.04% | -2,968 | -30.09% | 9,864 |
| Mesa | 43,084 | 48.21% | 46,279 | 51.79% | -3,195 | -3.58% | 89,363 |
| Mineral | 389 | 53.80% | 334 | 46.20% | 55 | 7.61% | 723 |
| Moffat | 2,464 | 38.53% | 3,931 | 61.47% | -1,467 | -22.94% | 6,395 |
| Montezuma | 7,119 | 48.83% | 7,460 | 51.17% | -341 | -2.34% | 14,579 |
| Montrose | 10,815 | 43.18% | 14,231 | 56.82% | -3,416 | -13.64% | 25,046 |
| Morgan | 5,018 | 38.48% | 8,024 | 61.52% | -3,006 | -23.05% | 13,042 |
| Otero | 3,829 | 43.92% | 4,890 | 56.08% | -1,061 | -12.17% | 8,719 |
| Ouray | 2,642 | 65.87% | 1,369 | 34.13% | 1,273 | 31.74% | 4,011 |
| Park | 6,238 | 52.65% | 5,610 | 47.35% | 628 | 5.30% | 11,848 |
| Phillips | 641 | 28.65% | 1,596 | 71.35% | -955 | -42.69% | 2,237 |
| Pitkin | 8,797 | 82.01% | 1,930 | 17.99% | 6,867 | 64.02% | 10,727 |
| Prowers | 1,758 | 35.32% | 3,220 | 64.68% | -1,462 | -29.37% | 4,978 |
| Pueblo | 44,162 | 53.50% | 38,381 | 46.50% | 5,781 | 7.00% | 82,543 |
| Rio Blanco | 1,136 | 31.87% | 2,429 | 68.13% | -1,293 | -36.27% | 3,565 |
| Rio Grande | 2,652 | 43.83% | 3,399 | 56.17% | -747 | -12.35% | 6,051 |
| Routt | 11,623 | 72.72% | 4,360 | 27.28% | 7,263 | 45.44% | 15,983 |
| Saguache | 1,911 | 59.18% | 1,318 | 40.82% | 593 | 18.36% | 3,229 |
| San Juan | 395 | 73.69% | 141 | 26.31% | 254 | 47.39% | 536 |
| San Miguel | 3,771 | 81.08% | 880 | 18.92% | 2,891 | 62.16% | 4,651 |
| Sedgwick | 465 | 36.05% | 825 | 63.95% | -360 | -27.91% | 1,290 |
| Summit | 12,816 | 75.52% | 4,154 | 24.48% | 8,662 | 51.04% | 16,970 |
| Teller | 6,696 | 41.81% | 9,319 | 58.19% | -2,623 | -16.38% | 16,015 |
| Washington | 677 | 24.84% | 2,048 | 75.16% | -1,371 | -50.31% | 2,725 |
| Weld | 87,153 | 49.96% | 87,302 | 50.04% | -149 | -0.09% | 174,455 |
| Yuma | 1,298 | 28.62% | 3,238 | 71.38% | -1,940 | -42.77% | 4,536 |
| Total | 1,921,593 | 61.97% | 1,179,261 | 38.03% | 742,332 | 23.94% | 3,100,854 |

=== By congressional district ===
"Yes" won all eight congressional districts, including four that elected Republicans.

| District | Yes | No | Representative |
|---|---|---|---|
| 1st | 81% | 19% | Diana DeGette |
| 2nd | 74% | 26% | Joe Neguse |
| 3rd | 54% | 46% | Lauren Boebert (118th Congress) |
| 3rd | 54% | 46% | Jeff Hurd (119th Congress) |
| 4th | 50.02% | 49.98% | Greg Lopez (118th Congress) |
| 4th | 50.02% | 49.98% | Lauren Boebert (119th Congress) |
| 5th | 52% | 48% | Doug Lamborn (118th Congress) |
| 5th | 52% | 48% | Jeff Crank (119th Congress) |
| 6th | 65% | 35% | Jason Crow |
| 7th | 64% | 36% | Brittany Pettersen |
| 8th | 58% | 42% | Yadira Caraveo (118th Congress) |
| 8th | 58% | 42% | Gabe Evans (119th Congress) |

== See also ==
- Abortion in Colorado
- 2022 Kansas abortion referendum
- 2022 California Proposition 1
- 2022 Michigan Proposal 3
- 2022 Vermont Proposal 5
- November 2023 Ohio Issue 1
- 2024 Arizona Proposition 139
- 2024 Florida Amendment 4
- 2024 Maryland Question 1
- 2024 Missouri Amendment 3
- 2024 Montana Initiative 128
- 2024 Nebraska Initiative 439
- 2024 Nevada Question 6
- 2024 New York Proposal 1
- 2024 South Dakota Amendment G
- 2024 United States ballot measures
- 2026 Idaho Proposition 1
- 2026 Missouri Amendment 3
- 2026 Nevada Question 6
- 2026 Virginia Question 1
