= Gallagher Amendment =

Amendment to the Colorado Constitution (1982–2020)

Colorado Referendum 1
- The Gallagher Amendment

Results
Choice	Votes	%
Yes	551,334	65.49%
No	290,590	34.51%
Valid votes	841,924	83.88%
Invalid or blank votes	161,850	16.12%
Total votes	1,003,774	100.00%
Registered voters/turnout	1,455,828	68.95%
For
80%–90%
70%–80%
60%–70%
50%–60%
Against
70%–80%
50%–60%

The Gallagher Amendment was an amendment to the Colorado Constitution enacted in 1982 and repealed in 2020 concerning property tax. It set forth the guidelines in the Colorado Constitution for determining the actual value of property and the valuation for assessment of such property. The Gallagher Amendment was a legislative referendum drafted by Dennis J. Gallagher, then a state legislator. It was repealed in 2020.

== Summary ==
The Gallagher Amendment made many significant changes to property taxes in Colorado:

1. It simplified the assessor’s methodology for determining the actual value of property. Prior to this amendment, the assessor would consider some seven factors. The Gallagher Amendment established just three: cost, market, and income.
2. It established that the actual value of residential real property would be determined by the cost and market approaches to appraisal only.
3. It established that the actual value of agricultural land would be determined by the income approach to appraisal only (this is the earning or productive capacity of the land, capitalized at a rate prescribed by law).
4. It provided immediate relief to the tax burden on various types of property by reducing the assessments rates for 1983 and 1984.
5. It required the General Assembly to determine the percentage of the aggregate statewide valuation for assessment of various classes of property commencing January 1, 1985. Specifically, the General Assembly would be required to adjust the assessment percentage for residential property to ensure that the percentage of the aggregate statewide valuation for residential property in relation to other taxable property would remain the same as that in the prior year, except for increased valuation for assessment attributable to new construction and to increased volume of mineral and oil and gas production. This provision would become known as the Gallagher Adjustment.
6. It exempted certain property from taxation. These exemptions included: household furnishings and personal effects not used for the production of income; inventories of merchandise and material and supplies held for business consumption or for sale; livestock; agricultural and livestock products; and agricultural equipment used on a farm or ranch in the production of agricultural products. Many of these classes of property had been considered a nuisance tax based upon the complexity of the valuation (and the time and resources which it required) and the marginal revenue produced by the tax.

The Gallagher Amendment had other effects as well, including mechanisms for enforcing the provisions described above.

== Ballot title ==
Shall Sections 3 and 15 of Article X of the Colorado Constitution be amended in the following manner:

1. regarding actual value and valuation for assessment: to reduce the valuation for assessment of residential real property, consisting of all residential dwelling units and underlying land and mobile home parks. But excluding hotels and motels from thirty to twenty-one percent of actual value: to require the general assembly to adjust such percent for years in which a new level of value is used in determining actual value as such adjustment is needed to maintain the previous year's percentage of statewide valuation for assessment attributable to residential real property. To reduce the valuation for assessment of all other taxable property from thirty to twenty-nine percent to provide that actual value be determined by appropriate consideration of cost approach, market approach, and income approach to appraisal except actual value of residential real property shall be determined by consideration of cost and market approaches only and actual value of agricultural lands shall be determined by consideration of earning or productive capacity capitalized at a rate prescribed by law: to provide that valuation for assessment for producing mines and oil and gas leaseholds and lands be a portion of actual annual or actual average annual production and be based upon the value of the unprocessed material;
2. regarding exemptions from property tax to exempt the following classes of personal property: household furnishings, personal effects, inventory of merchandise and material and supplies held for business consumption or for sale. Livestock, agricultural, and livestock products and agricultural equipment used on the farm or ranch in producing agricultural products;
3. regarding enforcement of property tax laws to provide enforcement provisions against counties that fail to determine actual value or valuation for assessment in accordance with the state constitution or with applicable statutes;
4. regarding the state board of equalization and the property tax administrator to provide that the board be composed of the governor or his designee the speaker of The house of representative or his designee, the president of the senate or his designee and two members appointed by the governor with the consent of the senate each of whom shall be an appraiser or a former county assessor or a person knowledgeable and experienced in property taxation. To provide for the appointment of the administrator by the board and to remove the administrator from the state personnel system?

== Election results ==
Passed by 551,334 votes (65.5%) to 290,590 votes (34.5%).

== Repeal effort ==
Amendment B
- Gallagher Amendment Repeal and Property Tax Assessment Rates Measure

Results
Choice	Votes	%
Yes	1,740,395	57.52%
No	1,285,136	42.48%
Valid votes	3,025,531	91.92%
Invalid or blank votes	266,130	8.08%
Total votes	3,291,661	100.00%
Registered voters/turnout	4,211,531	78.16%

For
80–90%
70–80%
60–70%
50–60%
Against
90–100%
70–80%
60–70%
50–60%
Other
Tie
No data

In 2020, due to state budget shortfalls, state legislators approved a ballot initiative to repeal the Gallagher Amendment. The changes in property tax rates the repeal would allow for greater funding of schools. The repeal was successful.
