= 2008 Colorado Amendment 51 =

Amendment 51
- State Sales Tax Increase for Services for People with Developmental Disabilities

Results
| Choice | Votes | % |
|---|---|---|
| Yes | 853,176 | 37.63% |
| No | 1,414,012 | 62.37% |
| Valid votes | 2,267,188 | 100.00% |
| Invalid or blank votes | 0 | 0.00% |
| Total votes | 2,267,188 | 100.00% |
County results
For
50–60%
Against
80–90%
70–80%
60–70%
50–60%

Colorado Amendment 51 was a citizen's initiative proposed by Wendy B. Rosanova of Centennial, CO, and Marijo Rymer, executive director of The Arc of Colorado. It was turned down by 62.4% of the voters. If it had passed, Amendment 51 would have amended the Colorado statutes to:

- increase the state sales tax and use tax from 2.9 percent to 3.0 percent on July 1, 2009, and from 3.0 percent to 3.1 percent on July 1, 2010;
- direct that the new money be used to pay for services for people with developmental disabilities and to help eliminate the waiting list for services;
- prohibit the legislature from reducing the current level of state funding for services for people with developmental disabilities; and
- exempt the new money from state spending limits.

== Statement of intent ==
(1) It is the intent of the People of the State of Colorado in enacting this initiative to eliminate the waiting lists for the continuum of long-term services for persons who, through no fault of their own, have developmental disabilities, including autism, cerebral palsy, Down syndrome and mental retardation. Long-term health care services and supports at a minimum could include a place to live, help with daily living tasks, early intervention care, nursing services, training and employment. Providing funding to end Colorado's waiting lists for children and adults with developmental disabilities will enable them to receive the necessary supports to live with dignity and be fully included in community life.

(2) As of November 2007 more than twelve thousand children and adults who have developmental disabilities were on waiting lists for long-term health care services and supports. Many of these children and adults wait more than ten years before receiving care. Many individuals need almost constant guidance and assistance due to behavioral or mental health problems, a lack of adaptive skills, major medical issues, and absence of family support. Further, many need assistance to eat, dress, bathe or use the bathroom. Some cannot speak or read and are seriously limited in their ability to express their needs. Still others are young children with autism who cannot access early intervention services that are so desperately needed and proven to be effective. Many of these children and adults and the families who care for them are at the point of an acute crisis due to their unfulfilled needs. The state does not provide back-up options for those in crisis, leaving many with no help at all.

(3) The People find the current circumstances unacceptable and do hereby enact a slight increase in the rate of the state sales and use tax – an amount equal to one or two pennies on a ten dollar purchase – to be phased in over a two-year period. The People acknowledge that current system infrastructure is insufficient to address the needs of all those on the waiting lists. A phased-in increase of revenue will allow time to build capacity in the current system to better serve those in need. It is the intent of the People that the revenues generated by this initiative be used to serve additional persons with developmental disabilities except in the event of a declaration of a state fiscal emergency as provided herein.

== Services for people with developmental disabilities ==
Services for people with developmental disabilities are delivered through a state and local system. The state administers the overall system; twenty local nonprofit agencies throughout the state determine a person's eligibility and arrange and provide services. Services are generally provided in the community or in the family home, and vary based upon the person's specific disability and needs.

In 2008 federal, state, and local government funding for these services is estimated at $372 million. The state's share of that total is about $184 million. This allows about 11,800 people to receive services.

== Waiting lists for services ==
There are currently about 9,700 adults and children on waiting lists for services within the next two years. That number is expected to grow to over 12,000 people by 2012. If funding to eliminate the waiting lists becomes available, a number of people who are not currently on a waiting list may seek services as services become more accessible. Thus, it is difficult to estimate the total number of people who are eligible for services and the cost to eliminate the waiting lists.

== Estimate of fiscal impact ==
=== State revenue ===
The sales tax increase raises about $89 million in budget year 2010 and about $186 million in budget year 2011 to provide services for people with developmental disabilities. The state is also expected to receive about $19 million in 2010 and about $39 million in 2011 from the federal government to fund these services.

=== State spending ===
Amendment 51 increases state administrative costs by about $100,000 in 2009, $315,000 in 2010, and $430,000 in 2011 to oversee the services provided to people with developmental disabilities and to implement the sales tax increase. These costs cannot be paid from the new sales tax money, but a portion will be paid with funding from the federal government.

Nonprofit agencies that provide services will experience additional costs of around $46 million in 2010 and $94 million in 2011. These costs include both providing the actual services to more people and startup and training expenses to accommodate the increase in services provided. The new sales tax money is expected to pay for some of these costs, with the remainder funded by the federal government. It is unlikely that all of the new sales tax money will be spent in the first several years because developing the capacity to serve the number of people who are on waiting lists will take time. Any sales tax money that is not immediately spent on services must be placed in reserve.

=== Impact on taxpayers ===
Both individuals and businesses pay sales and use taxes. Businesses pay about 40 percent of the state's sales taxes; Colorado residents pay about half; and the remaining 10 percent is paid by visitors to the state. The additional amount of taxes paid by each Colorado household will depend on a household's income and number of people. A three-person household with around $55,000 in annual income is estimated to pay an additional $20 in state sales taxes in the first year of the tax increase and an additional $40 in the second year when the tax increase is fully in place.

== Results ==
Amendment 51
| Choice | Votes | % |
|---|---|---|
| For | 853,176 | 37.63 |
| Against | 1,414,012 | 62.37 |
| Total | 2,267,188 | 100.00 |
