= 2008 Oregon Ballot Measure 54 =

Measure 54
- Standardizes Voting Eligibility For School Board Elections With Other State And Local Elections.

Results
Choice	Votes	%
Yes	1,194,173	72.59%
No	450,979	27.41%
Total votes	1,645,152	100.00%
Registered voters/turnout		85.7%
- Results by county Yes 60%-70% 70%-80% 80%-90%

Oregon Ballot Measure 54 (2008) or House Joint Resolution (HJR 4) is a legislatively referred constitutional amendment that removed provisions relating to qualifications of electors for school district elections. The measure is a technical fix designed to remove inoperative provisions in the Oregon Constitution which barred those under 21 from voting in school board elections and required voters to be able to pass a literacy test to vote in school district elections. This measure appeared on the November 4, 2008 general election ballot in Oregon. It was passed by voters, receiving 72.59% of the vote.

== History ==
=== Background ===
In 1948, voters passed a ballot measure amending the Oregon Constitution to require that in order to vote in school elections citizens must meet certain qualifications. Those qualifications were set forth in section 6, Article VIII of the Oregon Constitution, and included requirements that a citizen be at least 21 years old, have resided in the school district for at least six months before the election and have registered for the election. A citizen meeting these qualifications would also only be allowed to vote in the school election if they could also read and write English.

Later developments in voting rights laws and in court decisions have made each of those requirements unconstitutional or a violation of federal law. The 26th Amendment to the United States Constitution prevents denial or abridgment of the voting rights of a citizen 18 years of age or older. Federal court decisions have held that residency requirements of the type which were set forth in section 6, violated the Equal Protection Clause of the 14th Amendment to the United States Constitution. In addition, the federal Voting Rights Act of 1965 generally prohibits literacy tests as a condition for eligibility to vote. Because of this, Oregon’s Attorney General in 1972, Lee Johnson, held that the requirements under section 6 were unenforceable.

=== Path to the ballot ===
The move to put this measure before the voters began when in the spring of 2006 when the Grant High School Constitution Team in Portland were meeting to continue its preparations for the Center for Civic Education's annual We the People: The Citizen and the Constitution competition, in which knowledge of the U.S. Constitution is tested in a simulated congressional hearing.

While attending the Grant Constitutional Team meeting Roy Pulvers, a Portland attorney and the father of one of the students, brought up the provisions of Article VIII, Section 6 in the Oregon Constitution to the team and its coaches. He had been preparing for an election-law conference in Washington, D.C. he was going to be attending, and was reading through relevant Oregon statutes and constitutional provisions. He stated his belief that the requirements of Section 6 were unconstitutional. The team agreed and prompted the students to take action.

At first the students considered filing a lawsuit, but dropped the idea since it was no longer being enforced. Over the course of several months the students broke into small groups and researched the issue, gathering evidence to help overturn what they believed were outdated, unfair voting restrictions still codified in Oregon's Constitution.

Once they felt they had evidence, they drafted a letter outlining their case and sent it to Bill Bradbury who was then the Oregon Secretary of State. His office sent a letter to Hardy Myers, who was at that time the Oregon attorney general, to take a look at the section and give a legal opinion on the matter. The attorney general's office wrote back saying that while the section is still on the books it was inoperative. This prompted the secretary of state's office to sponsor legislation during the 2007 session of the legislature to amend the state's constitution, which became House Joint Resolution 4 (HJR 4).

On January 24, 2007, lawmakers held public hearings and invited three of the students, Hannah Fisher, Ethan Gross and Pulvers' daughter Evan, to testify in front of the House Elections Committee. The bill passed the House and Senate with Rep. Jerry Krummel (R-26) of Wilsonville being the only opposing vote. This placed HJR 4 on the 2008 general election ballot as legislatively referred constitutional amendment, becoming Measure 54.

== Passage ==
While there was no organized opposition to the measure, it was reported there was a theoretical problem with striking Section 6. Portland Constitutional lawyer Chuck Hinkle expressed a concern that if passed, the measure might prevent people who do not own property from voting in school district elections.

The Chair of the House Elections Committee, Representative Diane Rosenbaum, dismissed such concerns. She pointed out that is not the intention of Measure 54, and that there are no plans to restrict school bond elections to taxpayers. The measure went on to be passed by voters with an overwhelming 72.59% of the vote, the second largest margin of victory in the November 2008 general election ballot.
