= 2008 California Proposition 92 =

California Proposition 92 was Californian ballot proposition that voters rejected on February 5, 2008. It was a state initiative that would have amended Proposition 98, which set a mandate for the minimum level of funding each year for elementary and secondary schools and for the California Community Colleges.

== Proposal ==
Proposition 92 would have established a system of independent public community college districts and Board of Governors within the framework of the California Constitution. A minimum level of state funding for school districts and community college districts would have been calculated separately from the current K-14 education budget. Additionally, 10.46 percent of current Proposition 98 school funding maintenance would have been allocated to community colleges. Furthermore, community college fees would have froze at $15/unit per semester and limit future increase based upon a devised formula. Other associated budgetary allocations earmarked for the current K-14 system would also have been divided accordingly.

Proposition was projected to amount to an increase in state spending on K–14 education from 2007–08 through 2009–10—averaging about $300 million per year, with unknown impacts annually thereafter. The loss of student fee revenues would have been potentially about $70 million annually. Currently, student fees of $20/unit, go to the general fund, not to the community college where the student is enrolled.

== Results ==
No 50%–60% 60%–70% Yes 50%–60%

Proposition 92
Choice	Votes	%
For	3,613,332	42.79
Against	4,831,445	57.21
Total	8,444,777	100.00
Valid votes	8,444,777	93.12
Invalid/blank votes	623,638	6.88
Total votes	9,068,415	100.00
Registered voters/turnout		57.71
