= 2008 Colorado Amendment 50 =

Amendment 50
- Limited Gaming in Central City, Black Hawk, and Cripple Creek

Results
Choice	Votes	%
Yes	1,330,507	58.70%
No	936,226	41.30%
Valid votes	2,266,733	100.00%
Invalid or blank votes	0	0.00%
Total votes	2,266,733	100.00%
County results
For
60–70%
50–60%
Against
50–60%

Colorado Amendment 50 was a citizen's initiative that amended the Colorado state constitution to:

- allow residents of Central City, Black Hawk, and Cripple Creek to vote to extend casino hours, approve additional games, and increase the maximum bet limit;
- give most of the gaming tax revenue that results from new gaming limits to Colorado community colleges and to the gaming cities and counties;
- require statewide voter approval for any gaming tax increase if new gaming limits are adopted by any gaming town; and
- exempt the revenue raised from new gaming limits from state and local revenue spending limits

As of August 2008, Ameristar Casino in Black Hawk had given $2 million to Coloradans for Community Colleges, part of the $7 million in contributions that had been made by supporters of the amendment. Much of the contributions were expected to pay for advertising aimed at potential voters.

The amendment passed with 58.6% of the vote.

== Gaming limits ==
Since 1991 Colorado has permitted limited stakes gaming in Central City and Black Hawk in Gilpin County, and Cripple Creek in Teller County. The state constitution placed the following limits on gaming:

- single bets cannot exceed $5
- only slot machines, blackjack, and poker games are allowed
- casinos must close between 2:00 a.m. and 8:00 a.m.

Amendment 50 allowed Central City, Black Hawk, and Cripple Creek to vote to change the existing gaming limits. Each town may vote to extend the hours of operation of casinos, to add the games of roulette and/or craps, and to increase the amount that can be wagered on any single bet from $5 up to a maximum of $100. The towns may vote on changing any of all of these limits.

== Distribution of revenue ==
Casinos pay taxes on income from gaming and also pay various fees and fines. Last year, the state collected $112 million from gaming, an effective tax rate of 14 percent. After paying to enforce gaming laws, approximately one-quarter of the gaming money goes back to the gaming cities and counties, about one-quarter goes to historic preservation and restoration projects across the state, and half of the revenue is allocated to the state legislature to spend on programs. These programs currently include assistance to local governments for gaming impacts, tourism promotion, economic development programs, energy efficiency, and renewable energy projects, and highway projects.

Amendment 50 distributes new money from increased gaming activity differently from existing law. First, the casinos keep 86 percent. The 14 percent in tax revenue is then used to pay to enforce gaming laws related to any changes in the limits. Second, some of the new money provides annual increases to the programs and local governments that currently get gaming money. The rest is distributed as follows:

- 78% for financial aid and classroom instruction at Colorado community, junior, and district colleges based on each school's number of students
- 12% to Gilpin and Teller Counties, based on the proportion of the new money raised within each county, to help address the impacts of gaming
- 10% to Central City, Black Hawk, and Cripple Creek, based on the proportion of the new money raised within each town, to help address the impacts of gaming

Estimated distribution of new gaming money under Amendment 50 in millions of dollars
Amendment 50 Recipients	Year 1	Year 2	Year 3	Year 4	Year 5
Additional money to current recipients	$2	$3	$4	$4	$5
Community colleges	$29	$32	$46	$52	$63
Black Hawk, Central City, and Cripple Creek	$4	$4	$6	$7	$8
Gilpin and Teller Counties	$4	$5	$7	$8	$10

== Editorial opinions ==
An editorial in the September 29, 2008 edition of The Denver Post advocated voting against the proposed amendment, noting that it would "help an exceptional cause — Colorado's under-funded community colleges — but it would do so at a cruel and unfortunate cost." The paper noted that it had endorsed the expansion of gambling into these mountain communities in the early 1990s, only to have "seen the character of the once-charming towns destroyed".

An editorial in the Oct. 5, 2008 edition of The Aurora Sentinel endorsed the measure, pointing out the gambling industry had grown up in Colorado and state residents deserved to reap the benefits of that. Even if the benefits of this measure didn't hit so close to home in Aurora, the initiative is a good idea to preserve the economic health of this important tourism industry. The paper noted that the city's own community college badly needs the revenue.

== Results ==
Amendment 50
Choice	Votes	%
For	1,330,507	58.70
Against	936,226	41.30
Total	2,266,733	100.00
