= 2008 Colorado Amendment 47 =

Amendment 47
- November 4, 2008
- Prohibition on Mandatory Labor Union Membership and Dues

Results
Choice	Votes	%
Yes	1,003,056	43.89%
No	1,282,501	56.11%
Total votes	2,285,557	100.00%
County results
For
50–60%
Against
70–80%
60–70%
50–60%

Amendment 47 was a proposed initiative on the Colorado ballot for 2008. It was defeated.

The initiative was proposed jointly by Ryan Frazier of Aurora and Julian Jay Cole of Golden. According to the Blue Book, the state-provided ballot guide, Amendment 47 "proposes amending the Colorado Constitution to: prohibit requiring an employee to join and pay any dues or fees to a labor union as a condition of employment; and create a misdemeanor penalty for violation of this law."

If ratified, Amendment 47 would have added a new section to the Colorado Constitution, which would state, in part:

(1) This Amendment shall be known and may be cited as the "Colorado Right to Work Amendment".
(2) (a) No person shall, as a condition of employment, be required to:

(I) be a member of a labor union; and
(II) pay any dues, fees, assessments, or other charges of any kind to a labor union or to any charity or other third party, in lieu of such payments.

(b) Nothing in this section shall prevent any person from voluntarily belonging or voluntarily providing financial support to a labor union.

(3) Any person who directly or indirectly violated any provision of this section commits a misdemeanor and upon conviction thereof shall be punished by a fine in an amount equivalent to the most stringent misdemeanor classification provided by law.

== Fact-checking ==
=== Pro-Amendment 47 political ads ===
KUSA, the NBC affiliate in Denver, Colorado, analyzed one of the political ads supporting Amendment 47. Among their conclusions were that the particular ad was misleading when it stated, "All it does, it gives workers the right to choose for themselves whether or not they want to join a union." KUSA's analysis states:

As it stands now, [...] federal law prohibits anyone from being forced to join a union. What Amendment 47 would really do is give workers the right to decide if they want to pay any dues to the union for the purposes of negotiating for wages and benefits.

They also noted that agencies promoting passage of the amendment have received contributions from two organizations in Virginia, the Free Enterprise Alliance in Arlington the National Right to Work Committee in Springfield.

=== Anti-Amendment 47 political ads ===
Channel Nine News also fact-checked a political ad from the opposition. Their conclusions (excerpted):

TRUTH TEST: Will Amendment 47 hurt Colorado's economy?

QUOTE: The few rich owners who are pushing Constitutional Amendment 47 say they want to give people a choice.

TRUTH: It is true that some wealthy businessmen and women have backed Amendment 47 and groups supporting this amendment do discuss freedom of choice and the rights of workers. [...]

QUOTE: You do have a choice. Would you choose to pass an amendment that could strip away all progress that Colorado workers have made with wages and health care and retirement?

TRUTH: This is opinion, but regards the concerns opponents have about the impact of this measure on union organization in the state. [...]

QUOTE: In times like these, who would choose to destabilize Colorado's economy and put jobs at risk?

TRUTH: This is opinion, but regards opponents' concerns related to employment and working conditions. [...]

QUOTE: If it's not broke, why fix it? No on 47. It's risky, it's reckless, it's wrong.

TRUTH: This is opinion.

== Controversy ==
The backers of Amendment 47 have been found to have violated campaign finance laws.

== Support and opposition ==
One organization which supports Amendment 47 is called For A Better Colorado. An organization in opposition is called Protect Colorado.

== Results ==
Amendment 47
Choice	Votes	%
For	1,003,056	43.89
Against	1,282,501	56.11
Total	2,285,557	100.00
