= 2008 Oregon Ballot Measure 62 =

Measure 62
- Allocates 15% Of Lottery Proceeds To Public Safety Fund For Crime Prevention, Investigation, Prosecution.

Results
Choice	Votes	%
Yes	674,428	39.44%
No	1,035,756	60.56%
Total votes	1,710,184	100.00%
Registered voters/turnout		85.7%
- Results by county Yes 50%-60% No 50%-60% 60%-70% 70%-80%

Oregon Ballot Measure 62 (2008) (formerly IRR 41) appeared on the November 4, 2008 general election ballot in Oregon. It was an initiated constitutional amendment dealing with the issue of where a percentage of profit from the Oregon State Lottery should go. The initiative, if it had passed, would have required that 15% of net lottery proceeds be deposited in a public safety fund. 50% of that fund would have been distributed to counties to fund grants for childhood programs, district attorney operations, and sheriff's investigations. The other 50% of the fund would have gone to Oregon State Police criminal investigations and forensic operations. It is expected that most of that money would have been diverted from schools. It was rejected with around 60% of the votes statewide; every county except for Josephine saw majority rejection.

== Background ==
The official ballot title is: Allocates 15% Of Lottery Proceeds To Public Safety Fund For Crime Prevention, Investigation, Prosecution

Measure 62 has become unofficially known as the "Oregon C.S.I. Measure".

== Specific provisions ==
Where the money would go:

- 20% for grants to counties to fund early childhood programs for children who are at risk;
- 50% to fund the criminal investigation and forensics operations (including crime lab) of the Oregon State Police to assist law enforcement throughout the state;
- 15% to provide grants to countries to supplement existing county appropriations for the operations of District Attorneys;
- 15% to provide grants to counties to supplement existing county appropriations for investigation and field operations of county sheriffs.

=== Estimated fiscal impact ===
The state's Financial Estimate Committee prepares estimated fiscal impact statements for any ballot measures that will appear on the ballot. The estimate prepared by this committee for Measure 62 says:

- Measure 62 would require public safety spending from the state lottery fund of $100 million in the first year, increasing in subsequent years depending on how much money goes into the state lottery fund from the sales of tickets in the Oregon state-sponsored lottery.,

== Supporters ==
The measure was sponsored by chief petitioners Duane Fletchall, Steve Beck, and Kevin Mannix.

=== Arguments in favor of Measure 62 ===
Notable arguments made in favor of Measure 62 included:

- More money going into crime investigations will help reduce the backlog of investigations.
- Currently, some crimes in Oregon aren't investigated using modern forensic techniques because the resources don't exist.
- Rural counties especially need the help funding investigations.
- The money is needed to help stabilize funding for state police investigations.

== Opponents ==
Defend Oregon opposed Measure 62.

=== Arguments against Measure 62 ===
Notable arguments made against Measure 62 include:

- It would divert money from the lottery that would otherwise go to schools.
- From the Oregonian's No on 62 endorsement: "Ballot Measure 62 is one more in a long line of gratuitous assaults on good government in Oregon. Ill-conceived and poorly crafted, the measure would rip millions of lottery dollars from where they are most needed -- Oregon classrooms -- and squander them in a hodgepodge of public safety causes."

=== Donors opposing Measure 62 ===
Defend Oregon, as a committee, fought seven different ballot measures, and supported two others. As a result, it is not possible to discern how much of its campaign money was going specifically to defeat Measure 61. Altogether, the group raised over $6 million in 2008.

Major donations to the Defend Oregon group as of October 8 included:

- $4.1 million from the Oregon Education Association.,
- $100,000 from School Employees Exercising Democracy (SEED)
- $100,000 from the AFL-CIO.
- $50,000 from Oregon AFSCME Council 75.

== Newspaper endorsements ==
Here is how Oregon's major newspapers endorsed on the measure.

Newspapers	Yes	No
The Oregonian		No
Medford Mail-Tribune		No
Statesman Journal	Yes	
Bend Bulletin		No
Portland Tribune		No
Eugene Register-Guard		No
Daily Astorian		No
East Oregonian		No
Corvallis Gazette Times		No
Coos Bay The World		No
Willamette Week		No
Yamhill Valley News Register		No
Gresham Outlook		No
