= Dennis J. Gallagher =

American politician (1939–2022)

Dennis Joseph Gallagher (July 1, 1939 – April 22, 2022) was an American politician.

Gallagher was born in Denver, Colorado in 1939. He graduated from Regis University in 1961 with a bachelor's degree and from Catholic University of America in 1967, with a master's degree. Gallagher also went to the Harvard Kennedy School. He served on the Denver City Council, from 1995 to 2014, in the Colorado House of Representatives, from 1970 to 1974 and the Colorado Senate from 1974 to 1994. He drafted what was known as the Gallagher Amendment, a state constitutional change that set the balance of property taxes until its repeal in 2020. He also served as the Denver City Auditor from 2003 to 2014 and was a Democrat.

Gallagher was of Irish descent and a co-author of the book Irish Denver in the Images of America series from Arcadia Publishing. He raised a son, Danny, and a daughter, Meaghan, who died in December 2000.
