= Small Business Majority =

Small Business Majority (SBM) is a small business advocacy organization in the United States. It is based in Washington D.C., with offices in San Francisco, Sacramento, Fresno, Chicago, Denver, Los Angeles, Albuquerque, and Atlanta.

Small Business Majority performs opinion polling and writes studies to highlight questions and opinions on issues affecting small businesses. It uses this information to provide small business owners with information on how laws affect their bottom line, and to educate policymakers on a diverse set of issues that they can then advocate for, such as healthcare reform, access to credit and job creation.

== History ==
Small Business Majority was founded in 2005 by John Arensmeyer, a former small business owner, with the goal of giving entrepreneurs a greater voice in public policy debates. The organization emerged in response to the lack of coordinated representation for small businesses on issues such as healthcare, taxes, and access to capital.

In its early years, Small Business Majority became especially active during the national debate over healthcare reform, conducting research and amplifying the perspectives of small business owners in support of the Affordable Care Act, which was signed into law in 2010.

Today, Small Business Majority operates as a national, nonpartisan organization with offices in multiple states, continuing to combine research, advocacy, and education to strengthen the ecosystem for America’s small businesses.

== Healthcare reform ==
Small Business Majority studies how the healthcare system affects small businesses, and provides research and educational materials on healthcare policy to influence the implementation of healthcare reform.

During the development and passage of the Patient Protection and Affordable Care Act, Small Business Majority produced policy papers and informational resources that were used by healthcare reform advocates and small business groups to highlight small business perspectives on healthcare legislation. Small Business Majority organized small business forums at the White House with cabinet members and with the US Senate Small Business Committee, along with House committees and caucuses on healthcare issues. The National Journal noted that Small Business Majority's work on this issue "gained prominence on Capitol Hill and at the White House during the health care debate." Small Business Majority continues to inform lawmakers, employers and the public on key provisions of the law, and on the various aspects of its implementation, particularly state health insurance marketplaces and the healthcare premium tax credits.

== Clean Energy ==
Since Small Business Majority began working on clean energy issues in 2010, the organization has commissioned a wide body of opinion research to determine small business owners’ views on clean energy policies and the perceived effect of those policies on their businesses and the economy as a whole. The organization also conducts in-depth economic research analyzing the economic impact of state and federal clean energy policies on small firms.

Small Business Majority uses its scientific opinion polling and economic research to lobby for clean energy measures. This has included meetings with national and state policymakers including U.S. senators, representatives and Obama administration officials.
