= Poundstone Amendment =

Ballot measure in Colorado

Amendment 1
- 5 November 1974
- An act to amend Articles XIV and XX of the Constitution of the State of Colorado, concerning the annexation of property by a County or City and County, and prohibiting the striking off of any territory from a County without first submitting the question to a vote of the qualified electors of the County and without an affirmative vote of the majority of those electors

Results
Choice	Votes	%
Yes	409,174	58.35%
No	292,040	41.65%
Valid votes	701,214	100.00%
Invalid or blank votes	0	0.00%
Total votes	701,214	100.00%
County results
For
70%–80%
60%–70%
50%–60%
Against
70%–80%
60%–70%
50%–60%

The Poundstone Amendment is an amendment to the Colorado Constitution enacted in 1974 concerning county annexations. The ballot initiative was drafted by Freda Poundstone, a Colorado politician and lobbyist who opposed the efforts of Denver to absorb surrounding municipalities. Supporters claimed the amendment would prevent Denver from abusing its status and size, while detractors pointed out that it greatly limited the ability of the city to absorb other school districts and thus end segregation in its schools.

== Ballot initiative ==
=== Title ===
An act to amend Articles XIV and XX of the Constitution of the State of Colorado, concerning the annexation of property by a County or City and County, and prohibiting the striking off of any territory from a County without first submitting the question to a vote of the qualified electors of the County and without an affirmative vote of the majority of those electors.

=== Text ===
Provisions of the Proposed Constitutional Amendment

The proposed amendment to the State Constitution would:

1. Delete from the constitution the present requirement that annexation proceedings of the City and County of Denver be conducted under the general annexation laws applicable to all municipalities in the state ("The Municipal Annexation Act of 1965").
2. Require that annexation proceedings of the City and County of Denver be conducted under the general annexation and consolidation statutes applicable to the other 62 counties in the state.
3. Permit the General Assembly, by law, to revise procedures for changing all county boundaries, including those of the City and County of Denver, and thereby eliminate the constitutional requirement of a vote by the qualified electors of those counties from which territory is proposed to be stricken.

== Election results ==
Passed by 409,174 votes (58.4%) to 292,040 votes (41.6%).
