= South Dakota Small Investors Protection Act =

The South Dakota Small Investors Protection Act is also known as "Initiated Measure 9". This citizen initiated constitutional amendment appeared on the November 4, 2008 general election ballot in South Dakota.

== 2008 election results ==
Results by county: No: 50–60%; 60–70%; 70–80%

These results are based on the Elections Division of South Dakota.

Small Investors Protection Act
Yes or no	Votes	Percentage
Yes	146,831	43.4%
No	191,549	56.6%
Total votes	338,380	100%

== Background ==
Article 4 of South Dakota's Uniform Securities Act of 2002 concerns the state registration requirements and exemptions from them for broker-dealers, agents, investment advisors, investment advisor representatives, and federal covered investment advisors.

This initiative aimed to amend two specific subsections to make broker-dealers, agents, investment advisors, investment advisor representatives, and federal covered investment advisors liable for up to $10,000 in damages for each violation for commercially unreasonable delay in delivery of securities that they have sold; commercially unreasonable delay being defined for the purpose of this law as more than 3 business days. The purpose of this is to prohibit short-selling of securities.

Attorney General's Explanation:

"State and federal law regulates the purchase and sale of stocks and other securities.

A common "stock market" transaction is a "short sale" where, for example, an investor who believes a publicly traded stock is over-priced will borrow that stock from an owner, sell the borrowed stock, and repurchase the stock later at a lower price to repay the loan, thereby making money if the price has fallen. If the price goes up, the investor must repurchase the stock at the higher price to repay the loan, and will lose money. Measure 9 would prohibit short sales.

State law currently does not regulate the time frame for the delivery of securities upon sale. Measure 9 would prohibit anyone from routinely taking longer than three business days to deliver securities they have sold.

If it had been adopted, Measure 9 would likely have been challenged in court and may have been declared to be preempted by federal law and the United States Constitution."

== Support ==
Measure 9 was authored by former South Dakota Attorney General Mark Meierhenry.

This initiative was supported by South Dakotans for Securities Reform, chaired by State Representative Hal Wick (R-Sioux Falls).

"South Dakotans for Securities Reform consists of stockholders and concerned citizens who want to help protect South Dakota companies, stockholders and taxpayers from the harms of stock manipulation through naked short selling and failure-to-delivers."

=== Arguments For ===
Mark V. Meierhenry of Danforth & Meierhenry and Tim Mooney of Arno Political Consultants wrote the "pro" arguments for the state Ballot Question Pamphlet:

- Currently, if someone in South Dakota is harmed by short selling, they have to go to the place of the sale to seek restitution. This measure would mean that a lawsuit could be pursued in South Dakota.
- The measure does not outlaw short selling, it merely enables federal law regarding short sales to be prosecuted in South Dakota.

== Opposition ==
This ballot measure was opposed by South Dakota Governor Mike Rounds. "In a July letter to the industry association, South Dakota Gov. Mike Rounds said promoters might have good intentions, but the proposed initiative would unduly burden and obstruct interstate commerce."

Travis Larson, spokesman for the Securities Industry and Financial Markets Association, was quoted as saying: "The SEC has been given control of our financial market regulations so that we have one single set of rules and regulations for our financial markets," Larson said. "And if every state were to pass its own rules _ some of which may run counter to the SEC _ the patchwork quilt of resulting rules and regulations would tie up our financial markets and slow them, hurting our competitiveness."

The State Bar Association, South Dakota Chamber of Commerce and the board of directors for the South Dakota retirement system were all opposed to the measure.

=== Arguments Against ===
Gail Sheppick Director of the South Dakota Division of Securities wrote the "con" arguments for the state Ballot Question Pamphlet:

- The measure is too broad, attempting to regulate legal short sales outside of the state.
- Current federal and South Dakota law already prohibits the abuse of short sales.
- Brokerage firms might take their business out of the state should this measure pass.
- Initiated Measure 9 aims to prohibit the practice of "short selling" in the financial securities trade. Short sellers "sell high" with the intention of "buying back low." The Securities and Exchange Commission, which sets rules and regulations for financial markets, has traditionally allowed this type of trading activity. It is not clear that Measure 9 would stand up to legal scrutiny if passed.
