= Colorado Right to Life =

American anti-abortion advocacy group

Colorado Right To Life (CRTL) is an American anti-abortion advocacy group based in the state of Colorado. CRTL believes all human beings not convicted of a capital crime have a right to life from the moment of fertilization until natural death. The organization is opposed to abortion and euthanasia, as well as any kind of birth control that functions as an abortifacient or embryonic stem cell research that causes the death of an embryo.

== Background ==
Colorado Right To Life was founded in July 1967 by a coalition of anti-abortion activists — including Mary Rita Urbish, Charles Onofrio, and John Archibold — three months after Colorado became the first state to pass a law which legalized abortion in cases of rape, incest, or danger to maternal life.

CRTL was disaffiliated by the National Right to Life Committee in 2007, partly as a result of disagreement between the positions taken by the two organizations, and partly over an open letter which CRTL and several other major anti-abortion organizations signed. The open letter, paid for by independent donors, asked Focus on the Family chairman James Dobson to retract his statement that the U.S. Supreme Court's ruling in favor of upholding the Partial-Birth Abortion Ban Act in the case Gonzales v. Carhart was a positive outcome for the anti-abortion movement. The letter claimed that the decision actually affirmed widespread abortion rights, detailed methods which could be used to perform late-term abortions legally, and indicated that all but two of the Supreme court justices currently serving (Scalia and Thomas) supported Roe v. Wade. Carrie Gordon Earll, a Focus on the Family spokesperson, responded by referring to Colorado Right To Life as a "rogue and divisive group", and the National Right to Life Committee selected Colorado Citizens for Life/Protecting Life Now to replace CRTL as its state affiliate for Colorado.

Colorado Right To Life continues to operate as an independent entity, because its existence predates the National Right to Life Committee, and CRTL therefore owns its name and is not required to be an affiliate of any national organization.

Will Duffy is the president of Colorado Right To Life.

== Positions ==
Colorado Right To Life does not believe that an abortion should be permitted under any circumstances, including rape or incest, and this has resulted in disagreement between CRTL and other anti-abortion organizations like the National Right to Life Committee. CRTL has appealed to these groups not to support exceptions to the prohibition of abortion and not to advocate parental involvement legislation. CRTL maintains that any law under which an abortion would be allowed condones the procedure and is therefore unacceptable.

Because CRTL advocates the standard of a right to life "from fertilization to natural death", it also opposes euthanasia, arguing that the deliberate taking of one innocent life undermines the value of life as a whole.

CRTL objects to embryonic stem cell research, suggesting that research conducted on adult stem cells and cord blood is preferable, as neither relies upon the destruction of human embryos.

CRTL is on record as opposing Susan G. Komen for the Cure because the foundation does not recognize the abortion – breast cancer hypothesis and because they donate money to Planned Parenthood. Along with former Komen Foundation medical analyst Eve Silver, who is now an anti-abortion activist, CRTL met with the Komen board in September 2006 to discuss the abortion-breast cancer issue.

== Activism ==
Colorado Right To Life holds an annual event called the "March for Life" at the Colorado State Capitol to mark the anniversary of the Roe v. Wade decision. They also hold a yearly fundraising dinner known as the "Light on Life Banquet".

In April 2007, CRTL organized an event called "40 Years in the Wilderness", at which Alan Keyes, Judie Brown of the American Life League, and Flip Benham of Operation Save America gathered to collectively back a no-exceptions position on abortion and euthanasia. Another goal of the meeting was to bring attention to the Gonzales v. Carhart ruling for the same reasons outlined in the open letter to James Dobson.

CRTL actively pickets abortion clinics and has launched a campaign intended to halt construction of a new Planned Parenthood facility in Denver.

Colorado Right To Life was also the leading force behind 2008's Colorado Amendment 48 (2008), otherwise known as the "Personhood Amendment" (basically a statewide Human Life Amendment), and is trying to get another Personhood Amendment on the ballot for 2010, in cooperation with Personhood USA.
