= 2008 Oregon Ballot Measure 63 =

Measure 63
- Exempts specified property owners from building permit requirements for improvements valued at/under 35,000 dollars.

Results
Choice	Votes	%
Yes	784,376	45.79%
No	928,721	54.21%
Total votes	1,713,097	100.00%
Registered voters/turnout		85.7%
- Results by county

Oregon Ballot Measure 63 (IRR 21) was an initiated state statute that appeared on the November 4, 2008 general election ballot in Oregon. It would have allowed homeowners to make improvements costing less than $35,000 to their home/real estate without first obtaining a building permit.

== Background ==
On May 5, 2008, the Oregon Secretary of State announced that the measure had sufficient signatures to qualify for the November ballot. 82,769 valid signatures were required, and the initiative's supporters had turned in 83,869 valid signatures, or 65.65% of the 127,755 total signatures that were submitted. During the campaign to collect signatures, the pro-initiative committee paid Democracy Direct, a petition drive management company, a little under $40,000 to collect signatures for the measure.

== Specific provisions ==
If the measure had passed, the following provisions would have been enacted:

- The exemption would apply for changes to existing residential or farm structures and for building new farm structures that will not be lived in by people.
- Changes would not be exempt if the total value of changes in a year to a given structure exceeded $35,000.
- The addition of a story to an existing residential structure would not be exempt from building, plumbing, electrical and mechanical permit requirements.
- Measure 63 would not allow an addition that violates uniformly applied requirements for property line setbacks or that violates regulations establishing reasonable, uniformly applied limitations on the height of a building.
- Electrical wiring work would not be exempt unless performed or inspected by a licensed electrical contractor.
- A property owner could not accept an offer-to-purchase the property without giving the purchaser a detailed description of changes made to the property.

=== Estimated fiscal impact ===
The state's Financial Estimate Committee prepares estimated fiscal impact statements for any ballot measures that will appear on the ballot. The estimate prepared by this committee for Measure 62 says:

- Measure 63 will reduce local government revenue by between $4–$8 million each year.
- It will reduce state government revenues by between $450,000-$750,000 each year.

== Supporters ==
The measure's chief petitioners were Alan Grosso and Bill Sizemore. The name of the officially-filed committee supporting the initiative was the "Fairness in Home Improvement PAC".

=== Arguments in favor of Measure 63 ===
Notable arguments made in favor of Measure 63 included:

- Measure 63 would eliminate some of the bureaucratic interference involved with small property improvements by exempting specified property owners from building permit requirements for improvements valued at or under $35,000.
- Bill Sizemore says, "To me, it's so highly symbolic that in a country that claims to be as free as ours, you can't go out and nail some boards to the side of your house without the government's permission."

=== Donors in favor of Measure 63 ===
Funds for signature collection for the proposal were donated by a group called Hire Calling Public Affairs, which was affiliated with Richard Wendt, founder of Jeld-Wen, a Klamath Falls manufacturing company.

== Opponents ==
Defend Oregon was opposed to Measure 63, as was a group called Oregonians Against Unsafe Housing.

=== Arguments against Measure 63 ===
Notable arguments made against Measure 63 included:

- "Because building permits are often the primary enforcement mechanism for maintaining standards, making permits unnecessary seems like a sneak attack on the law. In fact, Measure 21 appears to be another instance of a bad neighbor law: one that puts communities on the defensive against individuals who might like to elide the rules."
- "Oregonians want to sleep safely at night knowing that work on their foundation, walls, roofs, electrical and plumbing was done to code. If this measure passes, that peace of mind will go out the window."
- The measure will put renters, home buyers, neighbors, and emergency responders at risk due to the extensive, shoddy construction work that can be done for $35,000 (or $70,000 over two calendar years).

=== Donors opposing Measure 63 ===
Defend Oregon, as a committee, fought seven different ballot measures, and supported two others. As a result, it is not possible to discern how much of its campaign money was going specifically to defeat Measure 59. Altogether, the group raised over $6 million in 2008.

Major donations to the Defend Oregon group as of October 8 included:

- $4.1 million from the Oregon Education Association.,
- $100,000 from School Employees Exercising Democracy (SEED)
- $100,000 from the AFL-CIO.
- $50,000 from Oregon AFSCME Council 75.

== Newspaper endorsements ==
Here is how Oregon's major newspapers endorsed on the measure.

Newspapers	Yes	No
The Oregonian		No
Medford Mail-Tribune		No
Statesman Journal		No
Bend Bulletin		No
Eugene Register-Guard		No
Daily Astorian		No
East Oregonian		No
Corvallis Gazette Times		No
Coos Bay The World		No
Willamette Week		No
Yamhill Valley News Register		No
Gresham Outlook		No
