= 2006 Colorado Amendment 41 =

Amendment 41
- November 7, 2006
- Standards of Conduct in Government

Results
Choice	Votes	%
Yes	938,888	62.57%
No	561,646	37.43%
Total votes	1,500,534	100.00%
County results
For
70–80%
60–70%
50–60%
Against
60–70%
50–60%

Amendment 41 was a citizen initiative adopted by Colorado voters in the 2006 general election. The amendment was approved by 62.6% of voters. Amendment 41 has three main sections.

Amendment 41's "gift ban" places new restrictions on gifts, broadly defined, given to Colorado state and local elected officials and employees in executive and legislative branches. Such persons are prohibited from receiving gifts with value exceeding $53 per year, subject to an adjustment for inflation. Gifts from lobbyists are banned regardless of amount. There are several exceptions to the gift ban, including an exception for gifts given between personal friends and relatives on special occasions and another for travel paid for by non-profits that receive less than 5% of their revenue from corporate donations or by other state or local governments.

Amendment 41's "anti-revolving door" provision prohibits statewide elected officeholders from lobbying certain state elected officials for pay for two years after leaving office.

Finally, Amendment 41 creates the Colorado Independent Ethics Commission. Four members of the commission are appointed by the state House, state Senate, governor and the chief justice of the Colorado Supreme Court. The fifth member must be an official or employee of a local government and is selected by the other four members. Members serve staggered four-year terms and receive no salary. No more than two commissioners may be members of the same political party.

The Ethics Commission issues advisory opinions and letter rulings to covered individuals or others asking whether a proposed course of conduct would violate Amendment 41 or any other ethical standard of conduct or reporting requirement. The Ethics Commission is also required to investigate and hold a hearing on all non-frivolous complaints alleging violations of the gift ban, the anti-revolving door provision, or any other standard of conduct or reporting requirement in state law.

The Ethics Commission was originally placed in the Colorado Department of Personnel and Administration. In June 2010, it was moved to the Judicial Branch.

== Legal Reactions ==
The state legislature, in the same legislation stating its interpretation of the initiative, asked the Colorado Supreme Court to resolve the dispute over the constitutionality of this implementing legislation, but it declined to act.

A state trial court of general jurisdiction in Denver, Colorado issued a preliminary injunction against the enforcement of Amendment 41 on U.S. constitutional grounds in 2007. The state court in this case issued a preliminary injunction banning enforcement of the gift ban on First Amendment grounds during the pendency of the litigation. On appeal to the Colorado Supreme Court, the preliminary injunction was then vacated on February 25, 2008, on the grounds that the suit was not ripe prior to the organization of the independent ethics commission, without reaching the merits of the constitutionality of Amendment 41 .

In 2008, then-Secretary of State Mike Coffman filed suit in Denver District Court against the Ethics Commission, attempting to block an inquiry into whether he permitted employees in his office to run outside private businesses using government data. After the Commission found that he was not aware of such activities, the legal challenge was dropped.

In 2008, Colorado Ethics Watch filed suit in Denver District Court against the Ethics Commission for failing to make documents regarding advisory opinion requests, letter ruling requests and non-frivolous complaints available for inspection under the Colorado Open Records Act. The case resulted in an order requiring documents to be made public and an award of attorneys' fees.

In 2009, The Colorado Independent filed suit in Denver District Court against the Ethics Commission for violating Colorado's Open Meetings Law by deciding the complaint against Mike Coffman behind closed doors. The case resulted in an order for production of executive session tapes and an award of attorneys' fees.

After these two legal losses, the Ethics Commission took steps to improve its compliance with Colorado's transparency laws.

In 2013, Secretary of State Scott Gessler filed suit against the Ethics Commission, arguing that Amendment 41 is impermissibly vague and that the commission's hearing process violates due process. Gessler lost his case in Denver District Court at which time he appealed to the Colorado Court of Appeals followed by the Colorado Supreme Court. He ultimately lost those appeals. Gessler then vowed an appeal to the US Supreme Court, but that appeal was denied in 2018.

== Proposed Constitutional Amendments ==
Amendment 41 supporters proposed a clarifying citizen initiative aimed at the November 2007 ballot, which escapes a usual ban on non-fiscal citizen initiatives at odd numbered elections by including a tax on lobbyists to finance the implementation of Amendment 41. But, this proposal was invalidated by the body that oversees the initiative process in Colorado for failing to state a single subject, and did not make it onto the ballot as a result.

No ballot issues to interpret Amendment 41 will be placed before Colorado voters in 2008. The Colorado General Assembly did not propose any referendums to do so, and no citizen initiated ballot issues were proposed and had titles approved in time to be included on the November 2008 ballot.

== Complaints and Penalties ==
The Ethics Commission has handled fewer complaints than opponents of Amendment 41 feared, and even fewer have found any violation or imposed any penalty.

In 2009, the Ethics Commission fined a state employee $400 for operating an outside business that conflicted with his state job.

In 2011, the Ethics Commission fined the Public Trustees Association of Colorado just under $3000 for gift ban violations.

On June 13, 2013, the Ethics Commission ruled unanimously that Secretary of State Scott Gessler violated the state discretionary fund statute by using public money to attend the Republican National Lawyers Conference in 2012. It also ruled 4-1 that Gessler violated the discretionary fund statute and state Fiscal Rules by requesting and receiving a fiscal-year end sweep of remaining discretionary account funds as personal income. The Commission voted to fine Gessler approximately $1600.

== See also ==
- List of Colorado ballot measures
