= 2008 Colorado Amendment 54 =

Amendment 54
- November 4, 2008
- Campaign Contributions from Certain Government Contractors

Results
Choice	Votes	%
Yes	1,130,098	51.21%
No	1,076,694	48.79%
Total votes	2,206,792	100.00%
County results
For
60–70%
50–60%
Against
60–70%
50–60%

Amendment 54 was a proposed initiative on the Colorado ballot for 2008. It passed with 51.2% of the vote.

== Purpose ==
According to the Blue Book, the state-provided ballot guide, Amendment 54 "proposes amending the Colorado Constitution to:

- prohibit certain government contractors from contributing to a political party or candidate for the contract's duration and two years thereafter;
- prohibit contributors to ballot issue campaigns from entering into certain government contracts relating to the ballot issue;
- apply the prohibitions on campaign contributions and ballot issue contracts to any contractor with a government contract or contracts that does not use a public and competitive bidding process soliciting at least three bids and with a total value greater than $100,000 in a single year; and
- apply the prohibitions on campaign contributions and ballot issue contracts to a labor organization holding a collective bargaining agreement with a state or local government."

== Results ==
Amendment 54
Choice	Votes	%
For	1,130,098	51.21
Against	1,076,694	48.79
Total	2,206,792	100.00

== Support and opposition ==
=== Supporting organization ===
Yes On Colorado Amendment 54

=== Opposing organization ===
Protect Colorado's Future

== Injunction issued ==
An injunction against Amendment 54 was issued by Denver District Court Judge Catherine Lemon in June 2009. Judge Lemon concluded that the language of the amendment was vague and often confusing, creating a law that would violate the right to free speech.
