= 2008 Colorado Amendment 49 =

Proposition 49
- Prohibit any Public Employee Paycheck Deduction (with Exceptions)

Results
Choice	Votes	%
Yes	882,398	39.24%
No	1,366,562	60.76%
Valid votes	2,248,960	100.00%
Invalid or blank votes	0	0.00%
Total votes	2,248,960	100.00%
County results
For
50–60%
Against
70–80%
60–70%
50–60%

Amendment 49 was a proposed initiative on the Colorado ballot for 2008. It was defeated.

== Goals ==
According to the Blue Book, the state-provided ballot guide, Amendment 49 "proposes amending the Colorado Constitution to: prohibit any public employee paycheck deduction, except for:

- deductions required by federal law;
- tax withholdings;
- court-ordered liens and garnishments;
- health benefit and other insurance deductions;
- deductions for savings, investment, and retirement plans; and
- deductions for charitable, religious, educational, and other tax-exempt organizations."

== Results ==
Amendment 49
Choice	Votes	%
For	882,398	39.24
Against	1,366,562	60.76
Total	2,248,960	100.00

== Support and opposition ==
- Vote Yes On Amendment 49
- Protect Colorado's Future
