= 2008 Colorado Amendment 59 =

Amendment 59
- Education Funding and TABOR Rebates

Results
Choice	Votes	%
Yes	1,010,409	45.69%
No	1,201,220	54.31%
Valid votes	2,211,629	91.43%
Invalid or blank votes	207,173	8.57%
Total votes	2,418,802	100.00%
Registered voters/turnout	2,637,766	91.7%
County results
For
60%–70%
50%–60%
Against
70%–80%
60%–70%
50%–60%

Initiative 126 or the Savings Account for Education Initiative appeared on the ballot as Amendment 59. The measure would have created a savings account in the state education fund funded by 10 percent of the monies deposited into the fund, including revenue that would otherwise be rebated under the Taxpayer Bill of Rights rules (which the measure called for diverting to the fund).

Beginning in 2011, Amendment 59 would repeal the constitutional requirement to increase annual spending on schools by an amount equal to inflation and student-enrollment growth (as required by Amendment 23). The other major part of Amendment 23, requiring annual one-percent increases in school spending, expired automatically in 2010. Amendment 59 was a citizen-initiated constitutional amendment.

== Amendment ==
The amendment would have:

- Created a savings account within the state education fund
- Funded the state education fund, beginning in the fiscal year 2009-2010, by deposits of 10 percent of the monies deposited into the state education fund
- Eliminated deposits from the state education fund if such deposits would cause the savings account to exceed eight percent of the total amount appropriated by the general assembly from the general fund and the state education fund in the previous fiscal year
- Diverted revenue the state would otherwise be required to rebated under the Taxpayer Bill of Rights rules to the state education fund
- Required that state education spending increase by the rate of inflation plus one percent through the fiscal year 2010-2011
- Restricted spending of the state education fund and state education fund savings account to specific education expenses
- Permitted the general assembly to transfer money from the state education fund savings account to the general fund only if the general fund would otherwise be unable to maintain the four-percent reserve required by law
- Required that maximum funds to be transferred from the general fund for transportation expenses, as provided by law, be expended before any money is transferred to the state education fund

== Supporters ==
House Speaker Andrew Romanoff was the leading proponent of the amendment and the similar Initiative 125 to fix problems and conflicts he saw in the state constitution between Taxpayer Bill of Rights (TABOR) spending requirements and Amendment 23, which protects and increases education spending. Both initiatives would eliminate tax refunds from TABOR, putting the money into a state education fund to be used for specific educational purposes. Romanoff and State Senator Steve Johnson introduced the Savings Account For Education (SAFE) measure in the legislature, where it died. Supporters hoped for a better outcome by taking the issue to the voters.

The group spearheading the effort was called Colorado SAFE: Savings Accounts for Education. Also supporting the measure were State Senator Ken Gordon, the Colorado Children's Campaign, AARP in Colorado, the Colorado Association of School Boards, and Republican state attorney general John Suthers.

Supporters said that the measure would protect public education funding by dedicating a permanent source of funding, untangling what they saw as a fiscal knot in Colorado's constitution. The measure also preserved the right of citizens to vote on taxes, one of the main features of TABOR. Trustees of Metropolitan State College of Denver endorsed the ballot measure on September 4, 2008.

Romanoff said it is important that the state set aside money during good economic times in preparation for the inevitable bad times. "If times are good," he said, "we don't need to spend every dime we're taking in." He said that the State Education Fund is like a "bucket" of money for public education which is being emptied faster than it can be refilled. "It doesn't do any good to have the State Education Fund if there's no money in it," he said. The measure would have eliminated the requirement that state education spending increase at a set rate.

== Opponents ==
A number of Republican lawmakers opposed the measure, including Douglas Bruce (who helped write TABOR). Bruce said that the measure "would mean unlimited state funding forever." According to Bruce, the main objective of the measure was to eliminate TABOR and make spending easier. "If [Romanoff] couldn't convince his Democratic colleagues and the governor of doing this through the (legislative-referred) referendum process, the question is how is he going to convince the rest of Colorado to give up their tax refunds," said Jon Caldera, executive director of the Independence Institute. "I'm not going to worry about it until he gets on the ballot."

== Financial backing ==
Colorado SAFE raised more than $500,000 in the first two weeks of September 2008, according to campaign-finance reports. Donors included the National Education Association ($250,000) and the Denver Foundation ($225,000). The committee's total donations as of September 15 were $1.3 million, and the group had $374,000 on hand.

== Result ==
Amendment 59
Choice	Votes	%
For	1,010,409	45.69
Against	1,201,220	54.31
Total	2,211,629	100.00
