= 2008 California Proposition 12 =

Passed ballot proposition to assist veterans

Proposition 12 appeared on the November 4, 2008 ballot in California. It is also known as the Veterans' Bond Act of 2008. The measure was legislatively referred to the ballot in Senate Bill 1572. The primary sponsor of SB 1572 was Senator Mark Wyland, R-Carlsbad. The vote to place the measure on the ballot was passed unanimously in both the California state senate (39-0) and assembly (75-0).

The ballot proposition passed in November and it authorizes issuance of $900 million in bonds to create a fund to assist veterans who are purchasing farms, homes and mobile home properties.

== Fiscal impact ==
The non-partisan California Legislative Analyst's Office estimated the proposition will result in "costs of about $1.8 billion to pay off both the principal ($900 million) and interest ($856 million) on the bonds; costs paid by participating veterans. Average payment for principal and interest of about $59 million per year for 30 years."

== History of veterans' bonds in California ==
California began the veterans' home loan programs in 1922. California voters have subsequently been asked 27 times to fund the program and have voted "yes" all 26 times, for a total of $8.4 billion in the past. The 2008 effort was the 27th time voters were asked to support the program. Prop. 12's request for $900 million is the largest request for a Cal-Vet bond.

== Supporters ==
Gov. Arnold Schwarzenegger

=== Arguments in favor ===
- The Veterans Bond Act will help California's veterans achieve the American dream of homeownership.
- Veterans who risked their lives in places like Kuwait, Iraq and Afghanistan will be eligible to join the more than 420,000 others who have bought a home with a CalVet loan
- Loans are repaid, along with all program costs, by the loan holders at no expense to the taxpayers
- There have never been any costs to the taxpayers under the previous authorizations
- The program helps reinforce the housing market in California
- Cal Vet loans generate thousands of housing industry-related jobs resulting in millions of dollars in annual payrolls

=== Newspaper editorials in favor ===
The Los Angeles Times

== Opponents ==
=== Arguments in opposition ===
- Voters may wish to end the program rather than continue it
- Benefits are not limited to only veterans who served in a combat zone but to any that served during a time of war
- Possibly resulting in unavailable funds for those who actually served in harm's way
- Eligible beneficiaries of the program may have never even left the United States
- Voters may wish to have the program rewritten so serving in harm's way is a requirement for eligibility.
- The interest on the bonds is federal and state tax free, which in a roundabout way means all taxpayers are paying some costs
- State taxpayers will be liable for any shortfall in the event beneficiaries fail to make payments and are unable to sell the home for full value

== Results ==
Electoral results by county

Proposition 12
Choice	Votes	%
For	7,807,630	63.53
Against	4,481,196	36.47
Total	12,288,826	100.00
Valid votes	12,288,826	89.42
Invalid/blank votes	1,454,351	10.58
Total votes	13,743,177	100.00
Registered voters/turnout		79.42
