= 2008 Colorado Amendment 58 =

Severance tax ballot initiative

Amendment 58
- November 4, 2008
- Severance Taxes on the Oil and Natural Gas Industry

Results
| Choice | Votes | % |
|---|---|---|
| Yes | 944,191 | 41.95% |
| No | 1,306,782 | 58.05% |
| Total votes | 2,250,973 | 100.00% |
County results
For
60–70%
50–60%
Against
80–90%
70–80%
60–70%
50–60%

Amendment 58 was a proposed initiative on the Colorado ballot of 2008 regarding Colorado's severance tax. It was turned down by 57.9% of the voters.

== Effect ==
The initiative stated that Amendment 58 would:

- "increase the amount of state severance taxes paid by oil and natural gas companies, primarily by eliminating an existing state tax credit
- "allocate the increased severance tax revenue to college scholarships for state residents, wildlife habitat, renewable energy projects, transportation projects in energy-impacted areas, and water treatment grants
- "exempt all oil and gas severance tax revenue from state and local spending limits.

== Conflict with Amendment 52 ==
Both Amendments 58 and 52 in the 2008 election regarded the handling of Colorado's use of the severance tax. While Amendment 58 would have allocated some of this money to college scholarships and natural resource conservation, 52 would have directed the money into improving Interstate 70 in Colorado (I-70).

== Results ==
Amendment 58
| Choice | Votes | % |
|---|---|---|
| For | 944,191 | 41.95 |
| Against | 1,306,782 | 58.05 |
| Total | 2,250,973 | 100.00 |
