= 2008 Colorado Amendment 52 =

Amendment 52
- November 4, 2008
- Use of Severance Tax Revenue for Highways

Results
Choice	Votes	%
Yes	790,124	35.78%
No	1,418,009	64.22%
Total votes	2,208,133	100.00%
County results
Against
70–80%
60–70%
50–60%

Amendment 52 was a proposed 2008 ballot initiative in Colorado, United States for around half of severance tax funds to be redirected to highway building and maintenance projects, especially expanding Interstate 70 in Colorado (I-70). 64.3% of the voters voted against it, so it did not go into effect.

== Results ==
Amendment 52
Choice	Votes	%
For	790,124	35.78
Against	1,418,009	64.22
Total	2,208,133	100.00

== Conflict with Amendment 58 ==
Both Amendment 58 and Amendment 52 appeared on the ballot in 2008, and they both regarded the handling of Colorado's use of the severance tax. While 58 would have allocated the money into college scholarships and natural resources, 52 would have redirected the money into improving I-70. Neither initiative passed.
