= 2008 Colorado Amendment 48 =

Amendment 48
- Defining a person to be any human being from the moment of fertilization.

Results
Choice	Votes	%
Yes	618,761	26.79%
No	1,691,165	73.21%
Valid votes	2,309,926	100.00%
Invalid or blank votes	0	0.00%
Total votes	2,309,926	100.00%
County results
Against
80–90%
70–80%
60–70%
50–60%

Colorado Amendment 48 was a defeated initiative to amend the definition of a person to "any human being from the moment of fertilization".

The initiative was proposed jointly by Kristine Burton and Michael Burton of the now-defunct organization, Colorado for Equal Rights.

This definition would have applied to all sections of Colorado law, thus giving a fetus the equal rights of life, liberty, and property as a fully developed, born person would.

== Text of the Proposal ==
Be it Enacted by the People of the State of Colorado:

SECTION 1. Article II of the constitution of the state of Colorado is amended BY THE ADDITION OF A NEW SECTION to read:

Section 31. Person defined. AS USED IN SECTIONS 3, 6, AND 25 OF ARTICLE II OF THE STATE CONSTITUTION, THE TERMS "PERSON" OR "PERSONS" SHALL INCLUDE ANY HUMAN BEING FROM THE MOMENT OF FERTILIZATION.

== Controversy ==
Colorado Right to Life supported the amendment. There was bipartisan opposition -- Planned Parenthood and 2008 Colorado Democratic candidate for the U.S. Senate Mark Udall were joined by anti-abortion Democratic Governor Bill Ritter, National Right to Life Committee (NRLC), and Republican Senate candidate Bob Schaffer.

== Results ==
Amendment 48
Choice	Votes	%
For	618,761	26.79
Against	1,691,165	73.21
Total	2,309,926	100.00
