= Personhood =

Status of being a person

Personhood is the status of having outstanding moral worth. Yet the specific criteria that qualify someone as a person are controversial. In the West, personhood tends to be defined in terms of "sophisticated cognitive capacities;" yet, in other societies, such as sub-Saharan Africa, personhood is more often understood as a relational process. Defining personhood is a controversial topic in philosophy and law and is closely tied with legal and political concepts of citizenship, equality, and liberty. According to law, only a legal person (either a natural or a juridical person) has rights, protections, privileges, responsibilities, and legal liability.

Personhood continues to be a topic of international debate and has been questioned critically during the abolition of human and nonhuman slavery, in debates about abortion and in fetal rights and/or reproductive rights, in animal rights activism, in theology and ontology, in ethical theory, and in debates about corporate personhood, and the beginning of human personhood. In the 21st century, corporate personhood is an existing Western concept; granting non-human entities personhood, which has also been referred to a "personhood movement", can bridge Western and Indigenous legal systems.

Processes through which personhood is recognized socially and legally vary cross-culturally, demonstrating that notions of personhood might not be universal. Philosophers Nancy S. Jecker and Caesar A. Atuire have argued for a cross-border view of persons as emergent from social relational processes involving human beings. They write that a person "emerges out of a complex configuration of relationships involving human beings; we might say they become a 'being-in-relationship.' The emergent 'being-in-relationship' is a person, showing aspects, including superlative moral worth, not present before the relationships came together." Anthropologist Beth Conklin has shown how personhood is tied to social relations among the Wari' people of Rondônia, Brazil. Bruce Knauft's studies of the Gebusi people of Papua New Guinea depict a context in which individuals become persons incrementally, again through social relations. Likewise, Jane C. Goodale has also examined the construction of personhood in Papua New Guinea.

== Philosophical definitions ==
In philosophy, the word "person" may refer to various concepts. The concept of personhood is difficult to define in a way that is universally accepted, due to its historical and cultural variability and the controversies surrounding its use in some contexts. Capacities or attributes common to definitions of personhood can include human nature, agency, self-awareness, a notion of the past and future, and the possession of rights and duties, among others.

Boethius, a philosopher of the early 6th century CE, gives the definition of "person" as "an individual substance of a rational nature" ("Naturæ rationalis individua substantia").

According to the naturalist epistemological tradition, from Descartes through Locke and Hume, the term may designate any human or non-human agent who possesses continuous consciousness over time; and is therefore capable of framing representations about the world, formulating plans and acting on them.

According to Charles Taylor, the problem with the naturalist view is that it depends solely on a "performance criterion" to determine what is an agent. Thus, other things (e.g. machines or animals) that exhibit "similarly complex adaptive behaviour" could not be distinguished from persons. Instead, Taylor proposes a significance-based view of personhood:

What is crucial about agents is that things matter to them. We thus cannot simply identify agents by a performance criterion, nor assimilate animals to machines... [likewise] there are matters of significance for human beings which are peculiarly human, and have no analogue with animals.

— Charles Taylor, "The Concept of a Person"

Relatedly, Martin Heidegger developed his understanding of the distinctive kind of being which a person is as Dasein. The term's literal means an existence as a "being-there" or "there-being." Heidegger writes that, "Dasein itself has a special distinctiveness as compared with other entities; [...] it is ontically distinguished by the fact that, in its very Being, that Being is an issue for it." For Heidegger, the way in which Being is an issue for a person as Dasein is their future oriented caring. This distinguishes Dasein from function or performance criteria of personhood.

Others also dispute functional criteria of personhood, such as philosopher Francis J. Beckwith, who argues that it is rather the underlying personal unity of the individual:

What is crucial morally is the being of a person, not his or her functioning. A human person does not come into existence when human function arises, but rather, a human person is an entity who has the natural inherent capacity to give rise to human functions, whether or not those functions are ever attained. ...A human person who lacks the ability to think rationally (either because she is too young or she suffers from a disability) is still a human person because of her nature. Consequently, it makes sense to speak of a human being's lack if and only if she is an actual person.

— Francis Beckwith, "Abortion, Bioethics, and Personhood: A Philosophical Reflection"

This belief in the underlying unity of an individual is a metaphysical and moral belief referred to as the substance view of personhood.

Philosopher J. P. Moreland clarifies this point:

It is because an entity has an essence and falls within a natural kind that it can possess a unity of dispositions, capacities, parts and properties at a given time and can maintain identity through change.

— J. P Moreland, "James Rachels and the Active Euthanasia Debate"

Harry Frankfurt writes that, in reference to a definition by P. F. Strawson, "What philosophers have lately come to accept as analysis of the concept of a person is not actually analysis of that concept at all." He suggests that the concept of a person is intimately connected to free will, and describes the structure of human volition according to first- and second-order desires:

Besides wanting and choosing and being moved to do this or that, [humans] may also want to have (or not to have) certain desires and motives. They are capable of wanting to be different, in their preferences and purposes, from what they are. Many animals appear to have the capacity for what I shall call "first-order desires" or "desires of the first order," which are simply desires to do or not to do one thing or another. No animal other than man, however, appears to have the capacity for reflective self-evaluation that is manifested in the formation of second-order desires.

— Harry G. Frankfurt, "Freedom of the Will and the Concept of a Person"

The criteria for being a person... are designed to capture those attributes which are the subject of our most humane concern with ourselves and the source of what we regard as most important and most problematical in our lives.

— Harry G. Frankfurt

According to Nikolas Kompridis, there might also be an intersubjective, or interpersonal, basis to personhood:

What if personal identity is constituted in, and sustained through, our relations with others, such that were we to erase our relations with our significant others we would also erase the conditions of our self-intelligibility? As it turns out, this erasure... is precisely what is experimentally dramatized in the "science fiction" film, Eternal Sunshine of the Spotless Mind, a far more philosophically sophisticated meditation on personal identity than is found in most of the contemporary literature on the topic.

— Nikolas Kompridis, "Technology's Challenge to Democracy: What of the Human?"

Mary Midgley defines a "person" as being a conscious, thinking being, which knows that it is a person (self-awareness). She also wrote that the law can create persons.

Philosopher Thomas I. White argues that the criteria for a person are: is alive, is aware, feels positive and negative sensations, has emotions, has a sense of self, (controls its own behaviour, recognises other persons and treats them appropriately, and has a variety of sophisticated cognitive abilities. While many of White's criteria are somewhat anthropocentric, some animals such as dolphins would still be considered persons. Some animal rights groups have also championed recognition for animals as "persons".

Another approach to personhood, Paradigm Case Formulation, used in descriptive psychology and developed by Peter Ossorio, involves the four interrelated concepts of 1) The Individual Person, 2) Deliberate Action, 3) Reality and the Real World, and 4) Language or Verbal Behavior. All four concepts require full articulation for any one of them to be fully intelligible. More specifically, a Person is an individual whose history is, paradigmatically, a history of Deliberate Action in a Dramaturgical pattern. Deliberate Action is a form of behavior in which a person (a) engages in an Intentional Action, (b) is cognizant of that, and (c) has chosen to do that. A person is not always engaged in a deliberate action but has the eligibility to do so. A human being is an individual who is both a person and a specimen of Homo sapiens. Since persons are deliberate actors, they also employ hedonic, prudent, aesthetic and ethical reasons when selecting, choosing or deciding on a course of action. As part of our "social contract" we expect that the typical person can make use of all four of these motivational perspectives. Individual persons will weigh these motives in a manner that reflects their personal characteristics. That life is lived in a "dramaturgical" pattern is to say that people make sense, that their lives have patterns of significance. The paradigm case allows for nonhuman persons, potential persons, nascent persons, manufactured persons, former persons, "deficit case" persons, and "primitive" persons. By using a paradigm case methodology, different observers can point to where they agree and where they disagree about whether an entity qualifies as a person.

== Philosophical critiques of personhood ==
Italian philosopher Roberto Esposito has written a trilogy of books covering the paradigm of the person in modern political thought: Third Person (2012), Two (2015), and Persons and Things (2015). Esposito's metapolitical analysis of personhood draws together three unique bodies of literature: critiques of the proprietary prejudice in liberal political philosophy (Simone Weil and Hannah Arendt), Martin Heidegger's critique of the humanist model of the proper subject (Eigentlichkeit), and Foucauldian biopolitics. Esposito argues that the "dispositif of the person" that animates modern thought creates a series of divisions in humanity. In juridical-political terms, the person is an exclusive model of private individual who is immunized from the obligations and duties that are required of individuals to be a part of a community. In biopolitical terms, the dispositif of the person creates a division in humanity, which separates proper life (bíos, qualified life) from animal, or improper life (zoê, bare life). This schism works on a collective and individual level. Collectively, only proper lives who are recognized by law as legal persons are treated as rights-bearing subjects. Individually:

[M]odern personalism, in all its expressions, re-establishes in every individual the separation between personal subject and human being. In this way subjective right, rather than being inherent to the entirety of the human being, applies only to the upper part, which is rational or spiritual in nature … This is precisely the definition of the person proposed by Jacques Maritain while he was actively engaged in drafting the Universal Declaration of Human Rights of 1948.

— Roberto Esposito, Third Person: Politics of Life and Philosophy of the Impersonal

Esposito's solution is to conceptualize a notion of the "impersonal." Starting from a critique of the Roman legal and Christian theological concept of the person, he develops a notion of the "impersonal" understood as the form of a possible reunification between biological life and intellectual life, body and person. The impersonal represents a break from the private, rights-bearing, and immunized individual in modern liberalism. It creates an opening for developing an affirmative notion of biopolitical life and for being in community (or communitas).

== Research ==
As an application of social psychology and other disciplines, phenomena such as the perception and attribution of personhood have been scientifically studied. Typical questions addressed in social psychology are the accuracy of attribution, processes of perception and the formation of bias. Various other scientific and medical disciplines address the myriad of issues in the development of personality.

=== Consciousness in humans ===
Human consciousness is not located in a single "center" but emerges from interacting brain systems. One useful starting point is the reticular formation, a network in the brainstem that regulates arousal and wakefulness. It connects to the thalamus and projects broadly to the cerebrum, forming part of the ascending reticular activating system (ARAS). This system does not generate the content of consciousness, but it enables it—without sufficient arousal, cortical activity cannot support awareness. In this sense, consciousness depends on both brainstem activation and cortical processing, not one alone.

Building on this, mainstream neuroscience distinguishes between arousal (brainstem–thalamic systems) and awareness (distributed cortical networks). The thalamus acts as a relay and integrator, coordinating sensory and cognitive signals across the cortex. Personhood, therefore, arises from large-scale integration rather than a single structure.

The sense of agency—the feeling that "I am the one causing my actions"—is linked to specific cortical regions. The prefrontal cortex (including Brodmann areas 9 and 10) supports planning and decision-making; the supplementary motor area (BA6) contributes to initiating voluntary movement; and the inferior parietal lobule (BA39/40) helps distinguish self-generated actions from external events. The anterior cingulate cortex (BA24/32) is involved in monitoring actions and detecting conflicts, reinforcing the sense of control. Agency emerges when these systems align predictions, intentions, and sensory feedback.

Thus, personhood is not a fixed essence or a solitary voice. It is a dynamic construction: a coordination between bodily states, brainstem activation, cortical integration, and social context. Consciousness provides the field of experience, while personhood reflects how that experience is organized into a coherent, acting self.

== Unborn ==
=== Ireland ===
In 1983, the people of Ireland added the Eighth Amendment to their constitution that "acknowledges the right to life of the unborn and, with due regard to the equal right to life of the mother, guarantees in its laws to respect, and, as far as practicable, by its laws to defend and vindicate that right." This was repealed in 2018 by the Thirty-sixth Amendment of the Constitution of Ireland.

=== United States ===
A person is recognized by law as such, not because they are human, but because rights and duties are ascribed to them. The person is the legal subject or substance of which the rights and duties are attributes. An individual human being considered to be having such attributes is what lawyers call a "natural person". According to Black's Law Dictionary, a person is:

In general usage, a human being (i.e. natural person), though by statute term may include a firm, labor organizations, partnerships, associations, corporations, legal representatives, trustees, trustees in bankruptcy, or receivers.

In Federal law, the concept of legal personhood is formalized by statute (1 USC § 8) to include "every infant member of the species homo sapiens who is born alive at any stage of development." That statute also states that "Nothing in this section shall be construed to affirm, deny, expand, or contract any legal status or legal right applicable to any member of the species homo sapiens at any point prior to being 'born alive' as defined in this section."

According to the National Conference of State Legislatures, many US States have their own definition of personhood which expands upon the federal definition of personhood, and Webster v. Reproductive Health Services declined to overturn the state of Missouri's law stating that

The life of each human being begins at conception ... Effective January 1, 1988, the laws of this state shall be interpreted and construed to acknowledge on behalf of the unborn child at every stage of development, all the rights, privileges, and immunities available to other persons, citizens, and residents of this state, unborn children have protectable interests in life, health, and well-being.

The beginning of human personhood is a concept long debated by religion and philosophy. With respect to the abortion debate, personhood is the status of a human being having individual human rights. The term was used by Justice Blackmun in Roe v. Wade.

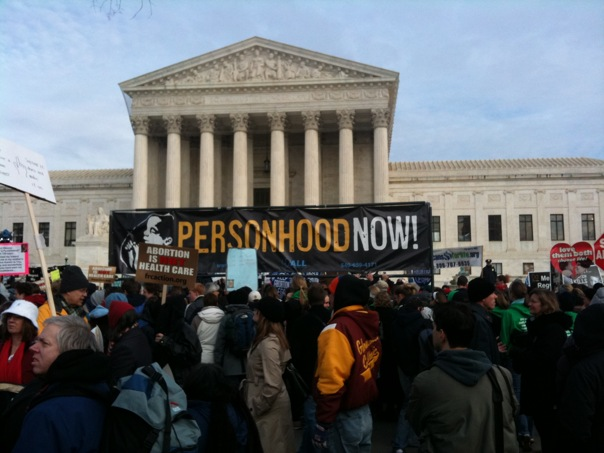
Personhood protest in front of the United States Supreme Court

A political movement in the United States seeks to define the beginning of human personhood as starting from the moment of fertilization with the result being that abortion, as well as forms of birth control that act to deprive the human embryo of necessary sustenance in implantation, could become illegal. Supporters of the movement also state that it would have some effect on the practice of in-vitro fertilization (IVF), but would not lead to the practice being outlawed. Jonathan F. Will says that the personhood framework could produce significant restrictions on IVF to the extent that reproductive clinics find it impossible to provide the services.

Currently, the personhood movement is led by the Personhood Alliance, a coalition of state and national personhood organizations headquartered in Washington DC. The Personhood Alliance was founded in 2014 and currently has 22 affiliated organizations. A significant number of the state affiliates of the Personhood Alliance were once affiliates of National Right to Life. Organizations like Georgia Right to Life, Cleveland Right to Life, and Alaska Right to Life left National Right to Life and joined the Personhood Alliance after refusing to support National Right to Life's proposed legislation that included exceptions like the rape and incest exceptions. The Personhood Alliance describes itself as "a Christ-centered, biblically informed organization dedicated to the non-violent advancement of the recognition and protection of the God-given, inalienable right to life of all human beings as legal persons, at every stage of their biological development and in every circumstance."

A precursor to the Personhood Alliance was Personhood USA, a Colorado-based umbrella group with a number of state-level affiliates, which describes itself as a nonprofit Christian ministry. and seeks to ban abortion. Personhood USA was co-founded by Cal Zastrow and Keith Mason in 2008 following the Colorado for Equal Rights campaign to enact a state constitutional personhood amendment.

Proponents of the movement regard personhood as an attempt to directly challenge the Roe v. Wade U.S. Supreme Court decision, thus filling a legal void left by Justice Harry Blackmun in the majority opinion when he wrote: "If this suggestion of personhood is established, the appellant's case, of course, collapses, for the fetus' right to life would then be guaranteed specifically by the Amendment."

Some medical organizations have described the potential effects of personhood legislation as potentially harmful to patients and the practice of medicine, particularly in the cases of ectopic and molar pregnancy.

Susan Bordo has suggested that the focus on the issue of personhood in abortion debates has often been a means for depriving women of their rights. She writes that "the legal double standard concerning the bodily integrity of pregnant and nonpregnant bodies, the construction of women as fetal incubators, the bestowal of 'super-subject' status to the fetus, and the emergence of a father's-rights ideology" demonstrate "that the current terms of the abortion debate – as a contest between fetal claims to personhood and women's right to choose – are limited and misleading."

Others, such as Colleen Carroll Campbell, say that the personhood movement is a natural progression of society in protecting the equal rights of all members of the human species. She writes, "The basic philosophical premise behind these [personhood] amendments is eminently reasonable. And the alternative on offer – which severs humanity from personhood – is fraught with peril. If being human is not enough to entitle one to human rights, then the very concept of human rights loses meaning. And all of us – born and unborn, strong and weak, young and old – someday will find ourselves on the wrong end of that cruel measuring stick."

Father Frank Pavone agrees, adding, "Nor is this a dispute about the state imposing a religious or philosophical view. After all, your life and mine are not protected because of some religious or philosophical belief that others are required to have about us. More accurately, the law protects us precisely in spite of the beliefs of others who, in their own worldview, may not value our lives. …To support Roe vs. Wade is not merely to allow a medical procedure. It is to acknowledge that the government has the power to say who is a person and who is not. Who, then, is to limit the groups to whom it is applied? This is what makes "personhood" such an important public policy issue.

In March 2007 Georgia became the first state in the nation to introduce a legislative resolution to amend the state constitution to define and recognize the personhood of fetuses. The Georgia Catholic Conference and National Right to Life supported the effort. The resolution failed to attract the super majority in both chambers required for it to be placed on the ballot. Georgia legislators have filed a personhood resolution every session since 2007. In May 2008 Georgia Right to Life hosted the first nationwide Personhood Symposium targeting anti-abortion activists. This symposium was instrumental in spawning the group Personhood USA and the various state personhood efforts that followed. Voters in 46 Georgia counties approved personhood during the 2010 primary election with 75% in favor of a non-binding resolution declaring that the "right to life is vested in each human being from their earliest biological beginning until natural death". During the 2012 Republican primary a similar question was placed on the ballot statewide and passed with a super-majority (66%) of the vote in 158 of 159 counties.

In the summer of 2008 a citizen initiated amendment was proposed for the Colorado constitution. Three attempts to enact the from-fertilization definition of personhood into U.S. state constitutions via referendums have failed. Following two attempts to enact similar changes in Colorado in 2008 and 2010, a 2011 initiative to amend the state constitution by referendum in the state of Mississippi also failed to gain approval with around 58% of voters disapproving. In an interview after the referendum, Mason ascribed the failure of the initiative to a political campaign run by Planned Parenthood.

Personhood proponents in Oklahoma sought to amend the state constitution to define personhood as beginning at conception. The state Supreme Court, citing the U.S. Supreme Court's 1992 decision in Planned Parenthood v. Casey, ruled in April 2012 that the proposed amendment was unconstitutional under the federal Constitution and blocked inclusion of the referendum question on the ballot. In October 2012, the U.S. Supreme Court declined to hear an appeal of the state Supreme Court's ruling.

In 2006, a 16-year-old girl was charged in Mississippi with murder for the still-birth of her daughter on the basis that the girl had smoked cocaine while pregnant. These charges were later dismissed.

In February 2024, the Supreme Court of Alabama ruled that frozen embryos were "extrauterine children" subject to the Wrongful Death of a Minor Act, based on protections for unborn children in the state constitution These protections were added in 2018 by ballot referendum, as Amendment 930 to the Alabama Constitution of 1901, and gained relevance when the 2022 U.S. Supreme Court decision in Dobbs v. Jackson Women's Health Organization returned full control over regulation of abortion to the states. The concurring decision of Justice Tom Parker cited Christian theology to support the decision, raising complaints about separation of church and state

=== Vatican ===
The Vatican has advanced a human exceptionalist understanding of personhood. Catechism 2270 reads: "Human life must be respected and protected absolutely from the moment of conception. From the first moment of his existence, a human being must be recognized as having the rights of a person – among which is the inviolable right of every innocent being to life."

== Slavery ==
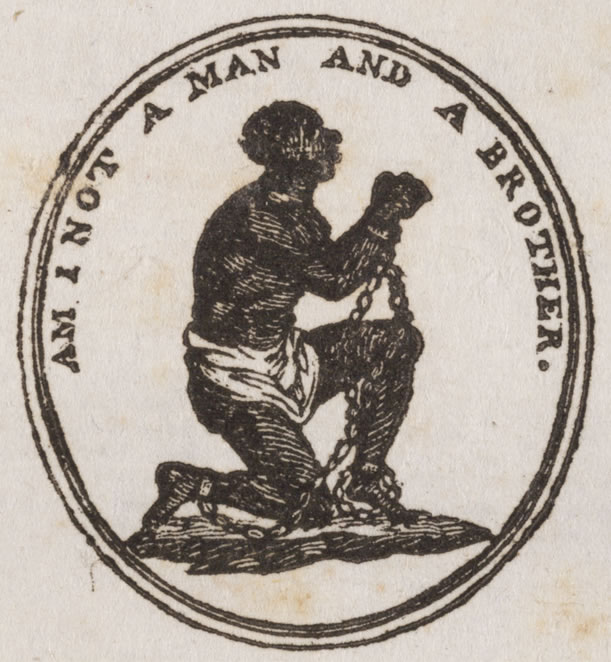
Am I not a man emblem used during the campaign to abolish slavery

In 1772, Somersett's Case determined that slavery was unsupported by law in England and Wales, but not elsewhere in the British Empire. In 1868, under the 14th Amendment, black men in the United States became citizens. In 1870, under the 15th Amendment, black men got the right to vote.

In 1853, Sojourner Truth became famous for asking Ain't I a Woman? and after slavery was abolished, black men continued to fight for personhood by claiming, I Am A Man!.

== Original peoples ==
The legal definition of "person" has excluded indigenous peoples in some countries.

== Children ==
The legal definition of persons may include or exclude children depending on the context. The US Born-Alive Infants Protection Act of 2002 provides a legal structure that those born at any gestational stage that are either breathing, have heartbeat, umbilical cord pulsation, or any voluntary muscle movement are living, individual human persons.

== Disabled ==
Adults with cognitive disabilities are regularly denied rights generally granted to all adult persons such as the right to marry and consent to sex, and the right to vote. They may also lack legal competence. Philosophical arguments have been made against the cognitively disabled being able to have moral agency. In many countries, including the US, psychiatric illness can be cited to imprison an adult without due process.

Those who become disabled later in life often experience a change in how they are perceived, including others infantilizing them or assuming cognitive disability due to the existence of physical disability. The concept of disability as being worse than death can be seen as a denial of disabled people's personhood, such as when medical professionals suggest euthanasia to non-suicidal disabled patients.

== Non-human animals ==
Some philosophers and those involved in animal welfare, ethology, the rights of animals, and related subjects, consider that certain or even all animals should also be considered to be persons and thus granted legal personhood. Commonly named species in this context include the apes, cetaceans, parrots, cephalopods, corvids, elephants, bears, pigs, leporids and rodents, because of their apparent intelligence, sentience, and intricate social rules. The idea of extending personhood to all animals has the support of legal scholars such as Alan Dershowitz and Laurence Tribe of Harvard Law School, and animal law courses are (as of 2008) taught in 92 out of 180 law schools in the United States. On 9 May 2008, Columbia University Press published Animals as Persons: Essays on the Abolition of Animal Exploitation by Professor Gary L. Francione of Rutgers University School of Law, a collection of writings that summarizes his work to date and makes the case for non-human animals as persons.

Those who oppose personhood for non-human animals are known as human exceptionalists or human supremacists, and more pejoratively speciesists.

Other theorists attempt to demarcate between degrees of personhood. For example, Peter Singer's two-tiered account distinguishes between basic sentience and the higher standard of self-consciousness which constitutes personhood. His approach has been criticized for accepting the personhood of some animals, but rejecting the personhood of people with disabilities such as dementia. It has also been given as an example of the limits of a capacities-based definition of personhood, in that they tend to be defined in ways that reinforce existing systems of power and privilege by preferring the capacities that are valued by those who write the definitions. A squirrel would value agility and balance in defining personhood; a tree might grant personhood on the basis of height and longevity, and a long-time academic, "a human being with a fully functioning cerebral cortex who resides in a social context where the workings of this part of the brain are particularly prized", would just as predictably value the qualities that benefited his own life and overlook the ones that had little relationship to his own life.

Wynn Schwartz has offered a Paradigm Case Formulation of Persons as a format allowing judges to identify qualities of personhood in different entities. Julian Friedland has advanced a seven-tiered account based on cognitive capacity and linguistic mastery. Amanda Stoel suggested that rights should be granted based on a scale of degrees of personhood, allowing entities currently denied any right to be recognized some rights, but not as many.

In 1992, Switzerland amended its constitution to recognize animals as beings and not things. A decade later, Germany guaranteed rights to animals in a 2002 amendment to its constitution, becoming the first European Union member to do so. The New Zealand parliament included restrictions on the use of 'non-human hominids' in research or teaching when passing the Animal Welfare Act (1999). In 2007, the parliament of the Balearic Islands, an autonomous province of Spain, passed the world's first legislation granting legal rights to all great apes.

In 2013, India's Ministry of Forests and Environment banned the importation or capture of cetaceans (whales and dolphins) for entertainment, exhibition, or interaction purposes, on the basis that "cetaceans in general are highly intelligent and sensitive" and that it "is morally unacceptable to keep them captive for entertainment." It noted that "various scientists" have argued they should be seen as "non-human persons" with commensurate rights, but did not take an official position on this, and indeed did not have the legal authority to do so.

In 2014, a hybrid, zoo-born orangutan named Sandra was termed by the court in Argentina as a "non-human subject" in an unsuccessful habeas corpus case regarding the release of the orangutan from captivity at the Buenos Aires zoo. The status of the orangutan as a "non-human subject" needed to be clarified by the court. Court cases relevant to this orangutan were continuing in 2015. Finally, in 2019, Sandra was granted nonhuman personhood and freed from captivity to a Florida sanctuary.

In 2015, for the first time, two chimpanzees, Hercules and Leo, were thought to be "legal persons", having been granted a writ of habeas corpus. This meant their detainer, Stony Brook University, had to provide a legally sufficient reason for their imprisonment. This view was rejected and the writ was reversed by the officiating judge shortly thereafter.

== Women ==
In the United States, the personhood of women has important legal consequences. Although in 1920 the 19th Amendment guaranteed women in the right to vote, it was not until 1971 that the US Supreme Court ruled in Reed v. Reed that the law cannot discriminate between the sexes because the 14th amendment grants equal protection to all "persons". In 2011, Supreme Court Justice Antonin Scalia disputed the conclusion of Reed v. Reed, arguing that women do not have equal protection under the 14th amendment as "persons" because the Constitution's use of the gender-neutral term "Person" means that the Constitution does not require discrimination on the basis of sex, but also does not prohibit such discrimination, adding "Nobody ever thought that that's what it meant. Nobody ever voted for that." Many others, including law professor Jack Balkin disagree with this assertion. Balkin states that, at a minimum "the fourteenth amendment was intended to prohibit some forms of sex discrimination – discrimination in basic civil rights against single women." Many local marriage laws at the time the 14th Amendment was ratified (as well as when the original Constitution was ratified) had concepts of coverture and "head-and-master", which meant that women legally lost rights upon marriage, including rights to ownership of property and other rights of adult participation in the political economy; single women retained these rights, however, and voted in some jurisdictions.

Other commentators have noted that some of the ratifiers of the US Constitution (in 1787) also, in contemporaneous contexts, ratified state level Constitutions that saw women as Persons and required them to be treated as such, including granting women rights such as the right to vote. Professor Jane Calvert argues that the 17th and 18th Century Quaker concept of Personhood applied to women, and the prevalence of Quakers in the population of several colonies, such as New Jersey and Pennsylvania, at the time that the original Constitution was drafted and ratified likely influenced the choice of the term "Person" for the Constitution instead of the term "Man", which was used in the Declaration of Independence and in the contemporaneously drafted French Constitution of 1791.

The personhood of women also has consequences for the ethics of abortion. For example, in "A Defense of Abortion", Judith Jarvis Thomson argues that one person's right to bodily autonomy trumps another's right to life, and therefore abortion does not violate a fetus's right to life: Instead abortion should be understood as the pregnant women withdrawing her own body from use, which causes the fetus to die.

Questions pertaining to the personhood of women and the personhood of fetuses have legal and ethical consequences for reproductive rights beyond abortion as well. For example, some fetal homicide laws have resulted in jail time for women suspected of drug use during a pregnancy that ended in a miscarriage, like one Alabama woman who was sentenced to ten years.

== Corporations ==
In statutory and corporate law, certain social constructs are legally considered persons. In many jurisdictions, some corporations and other organizations are considered juridical persons (a subtype of legal persons) with standing to own, possess, enter contracts, as well as to sue or be sued in court, or even to be indicted, in selected jurisdictions. This is known as legal or corporate personhood.

In 1819, the US Supreme Court ruled in Dartmouth College v. Woodward, that corporations have the same rights as natural persons to enforce contracts.

== Environmental entities ==
Since the new millennium, treating parts of nature like waterways as persons has become increasingly popular.

=== Bolivia ===
In 2006, Bolivia passed a law recognizing the rights of nature "to not be affected by mega-infrastructure and development projects that affect the balance of ecosystems and the local inhabitant communities".

=== Canada ===
In February 2021, the Magpie River (Quebec) became the first river in Canada to be granted legal personhood, after the local municipality of Minganie and the Innu Council of Ekuanitshit passed joint resolutions. The goal is to protect it long-term given its appeal for energy producers like Hydro-Quebec and Innergex Renewable Energy. It has since the right to flow, maintain biodiversity, be free from pollution, and to sue.

=== Colombia ===
In 2016, the Constitutional Court of Colombia granted legal rights to the Rio Atrato; in 2018, the Supreme Court of Colombia granted the Amazon river ecosystem legal rights.

=== Ecuador ===
In 2008, Ecuador approved a constitution to recognize that nature "...has the right to exist, persist, maintain and regenerate its vital cycles, structure, functions and its processes in evolution."

=== India ===
In 2017, a court in the northern Indian state of Uttarakhand recognized the Ganges and Yamuna as legal persons. The judges cited Whanganui river in New Zealand as precedent for the action.

=== New Zealand ===
The Whanganui River of New Zealand is revered by the local Māori people as Te Awa Tupua, sometimes translated as "an integrated, living whole". Efforts to grant it special legal protection have been pursued by the Whanganui iwi since the 1870s. In 2012, an agreement to grant legal personhood to the river was signed between the New Zealand government and the Whanganui River Māori Trust. One guardian from the Crown and one from the Whanganui are responsible for protecting the river.

=== United States ===
In 2019, the Klamath River has been granted personhood by the Yurok Tribe. Also in February 2019, voters in Toledo, Ohio passed the "Lake Erie Bill of Rights" (LEBOR), which granted personhood rights to Lake Erie. The law was challenged in federal court on constitutional grounds by Drewes Farms Partnership, with the state government of Ohio joining as an intervenor. The law was overturned due to the vagueness of at least three portions of the law, with the court also criticizing the applicability of the law to other Lake Erie-bordering jurisdictions' laws regarding the lake.

== Religion ==
In China's religious philosophy of Taoism, the Tao is a path of life and a divine field; not exhibiting personhood of itself, but "if well-nourished", is supposedly beneficial towards persons and the components of personhood.

Many generally non-religious Japanese people maintain a degree of Shinto spirituality (thus avoiding fully declared non-spirituality) because the kami are not as central to the Shinto religion as a monotheistic creator God, thus having an indirect impact on the formation of an individual's personality. The non-centrality of the kami allow an individual to take an ambivalent stance towards atheism or theism and deism. Religiously speaking, the degree of personhood granted to a deity (along with their universal centrality to a given religion) may be seen to have an impact on the world view and understandings of personhood by mortal individuals.

=== Christianity ===
The Latin word persona is probably derived from the Etruscan word phersu, with the same meaning, and that from the Greek πρόσωπον (prosōpon). Its meaning in the latter Roman period changed to indicate a character of a theatrical performance or court of law, when it became apparent that different individuals could assume the same role and that legal attributes such as rights, powers, and duties followed the role. The same individuals as actors could play different roles, each with its own legal attributes, sometimes even in the same court appearance.

According to other sources, which also admit that the origin of the term is not completely clear, persona could be related to the Latin verb per-sonare, literally: sounding through, with an obvious link to the above-mentioned theatrical mask, which often incorporated a small megaphone. The word was transformed from its theater use into a term with strict technical theological meaning by Tertullian in his work, Adversus Praxean (Against Praxeas), in order to distinguish the three "persons" of the Trinity. Christianity is thus the first philosophical system to use the word "person" in its modern sense. Subsequently, Boethius refined the word to mean "an individual substance of a rational nature." This can be re-stated as "that which possesses an intellect and a will."

The definition of Boethius as it stands can hardly be considered a satisfactory one. The words taken literally can be applied to the rational soul of man, and also the human nature of Christ. That St. Thomas accepts it is presumably due to the fact that he found it in possession, and recognized as the traditional definition. He explains it in terms that practically constitute a new definition. Individua substantia signifies, he says, substantia, completa, per se subsistens, separata ab aliia, i.e., a substance, complete, subsisting per se, existing apart from others (III, Q. xvi, a. 12, ad 2um).

If to this be added rationalis naturae, we have a definition comprising the five notes that go to make up a person: (a) substantia-- this excludes accident; (b) completa-- it must form a complete nature; that which is a part, either actually or "aptitudinally" does not satisfy the definition; (c) per se subsistens--the person exists in itself and for itself; he or she is sui juris, the ultimate possessor of his or her nature and all its acts, the ultimate subject of predication of all his or her attributes; that which exists in another is not a person; (d) separata ab aliis--this excludes the universal, substantia secunda, which has no existence apart from the individual; (e) rationalis naturae--excludes all non-intellectual supposita.

To a person therefore belongs a threefold incommunicability, expressed in notes (b), (c), and (d). The human soul belongs to the nature as a part of it, and is therefore not a person, even when existing separately.

— Catholic Encyclopedia, 1913, Person

== See also ==
- Abortion debate
- Environmental personhood
- Ethics of artificial intelligence
- Natural person in French law
- Nonperson treatment
- Right to personal identity
- Speciesism
- Valladolid debate
