= Status dynamic psychotherapy =

Status Dynamic Psychotherapy (SDT) is an approach to psychotherapy that focuses on changing a client's "statuses", whether they be career related, personal or social in nature. SDT is characterized by its lack of focus on factors traditionally targeted by psychotherapy such as the client's behaviors and cognitions, and how unconscious factors come into play. SDT was created by Peter G. Ossorio at the University of Colorado Boulder in the late 1960s as part of a larger system known as "descriptive psychology".

Proponents of SDT maintain:

- That this emphasis does not conflict with the emphases of other schools,
- That status dynamic ideas can be used in conjunction with them in an integrated way, and
- That SDT thus represents a way for therapists to expand (vs. replace) their repertoire of explanations and clinical interventions.

== Key idea ==
Proponents of status dynamics are centrally concerned with persons' statuses—these positions that they occupy in relation to everything in their worlds—because they see them as crucial determinants of the range of behaviors in which these persons are able to participate. They maintain that certain positions expands a person's eligibilities, opportunities, and reasons to act in valued ways (termed their "behavior potential"), while the occupation of others constricts such behavior potential. A favored analogy that they use to illustrate this point involves military hierarchies, in which an individual might be a private or general. The latter, they point out, carries with it a greatly expanded power and range of possible behaviors. For example, a general, unlike a private, can give orders to virtually everyone else in the chain of command, can enjoy a host of officers' privileges, and can have a far greater voice in important decisions. Critically, SDT proponents note, this greater behavior potential is completely independent of all the factors historically targeted for change by the major schools of psychotherapy such as the general's beliefs, behavioral skills, motives, and biochemical states.

The primary focus of SDT is to bring about positive change through "status enhancement" or "accreditation". That is, it is to assist clients by literally assigning them positions of enhanced power and/or eligibility. At times, this strategy entails the therapist assigning clients new, more viable relational positions. More frequently, it entails helping them to realize relational positions that they have occupied all along but that, for whatever reason, they have failed to realize and exploit. In their terms, SDT therapists strive to position their clients "to fight downhill battles and not uphill ones," and "to be in the driver's seat and not the passenger one." To quote a prominent spokesman for this point of view, they seek to help clients:

- to approach their problems from the vantage point of proactive, in-control actors and not helpless victims;
- to attack these problems from the position of acceptable, sense-making, care-meriting persons who bring ample strengths, resources, and past successes to the solution of their difficulties; and
- to proceed from reconstructed worlds, and from places within these worlds, in which they are eligible and able to participate in life in meaningful and fulfilling ways.

== Clinical applications ==
Three general applications of the basic status dynamic ideas just outlined may be distinguished. In SDT, the therapist

- establishes a two-person community in which they function as an effective status assigner,
- Assigns statuses to the client on an a priori basis, and
- Assigns them on an empirical basis.

=== Therapist establishes self as effective status assigner ===
All psychotherapy begins with a meeting between the therapist and the client. From the status dynamic point of view, if all goes well, the result of this meeting will be the formation of a two-person community that is in a certain sense set apart from the larger community and world. Further, and perhaps unique to the SDT, a central purpose of this two-person community is to provide a place where the client's status can be enhanced in a way that better positions them to overcome presenting problems. In order to achieve this goal, according to SDT, it is important for the therapist to acquire the ability to function as a powerful status-assigner in the client's world—the power, if needed, even to preempt and/or to disqualify as valid status assigners other persons or groups who are degrading the client illegitimately such as the family of origin, the spouse, the peer group, or even the culture at large.

According to SDT, if the therapeutic community is to have its intended effect, an essential requirement is that the therapist have the kind of standing in the client's eyes that is necessary to function as an effective status assigner. To this end, SDT proponents maintain that it is imperative that therapists conduct themselves in ways that are likely to result in the achievement of such standing. Among the most important therapist characteristics and behaviors that they emphasize in this regard are credibility and being one's "own person."

==== Credibility ====
If the therapist's status assignments are to be accepted, the client must find him or her credible. To this end, SDT maintains, it is necessary that the client perceive the therapist as possessing two essential characteristics: honesty and competence. To achieve this, SDT advocates therapist behaviors such as interviewing skillfully, conveying an accurate and empathic understanding of the client, providing explanations that are cogent and compelling, citing relevant research and other literature, presenting self in unobtrusive ways as experienced and successful, dressing and behaving professionally, and creating a physical environment with elements (e.g., books and diplomas) that suggest competence. In contrast, they urge avoidance of such behaviors such as therapists denigrating themselves, conveying undue tentativeness, espousing theories that appear strange or unconvincing to the client, lying, or behaving unprofessionally.

=== Therapist as their "own person" ===
From a status dynamic point of view, it is imperative that clients see their therapists as individuals able and willing to state their true positions on things, to agree or disagree, to cooperate or confront, and to set self-respecting limits on what they will and won't do in relation to the client. Where this is absent (where the patient perceives the therapist as having to be perpetually nice and agreeable), SDT maintains, the therapist's reactions to the client may not being perceived as legitimate affirmations of the client's status.

=== Assigning statuses on an a priori basis: The therapeutic relationship ===
SDT proponents say that, in the ordinary course of events, statuses (relational positions) are assigned on the basis of observation. One person observes another and sees that she is a wife, a teacher, a pursuer of a distancing husband, a relentless critic of herself, and a peacemaker in her family of origin. However, SDT notes, statuses may also be assigned a priori. For example, in the judicial system, jury members are instructed to regard the defendant, prior to the presentation of any evidence, as "innocent until proven guilty." A further example from the clinical domain comes from the work of Carl Rogers, who assigned to all of his clients the status of "unconditionally acceptable person," not on the basis of observation, but a priori; and who consistently treated them as unconditionally acceptable persons.

A central application of SDT is the creation of a therapeutic relationship in which clients are assigned certain statuses on an a priori basis, and are consistently treated as having these statuses. In this approach, therapists are enjoined to commit themselves to regarding and treating their clients in certain ways, not on the basis of their observations, but simply by virtue of the fact that these clients are persons. Where Rogers in essence made one a priori status assignment, the status dynamic approach urges that a much greater number of such assignments be made. These include (but are not necessarily limited to) the following.

==== Acceptable ====
Someone who is worthy of the acceptance of others. To assign a client this status means to accept that client genuinely in much the same way advocated in Rogers' person-centered psychotherapy.

==== Sense-making ====
Someone who is ineligible to make no sense; i.e., someone whose every emotion, judgment, and action has a logic that is in principle reconstructible, and whose every perception is an understandable way of looking at things. In SDT, clients are regarded as eligible to be mistaken in their perceptions and judgments at times, but never eligible to make no sense.

==== Someone whose best interests come first in relationship ====
Someone who is worthy of having his or her best interests constitute the genuine concern and goal of another. This is a state of affairs, SDT proponents note, which represents the essential characteristic of love in many classical traditions and in the minds of many persons, and thus this accreditation bears on the client's lovability. Operationally, this status assignment entails the therapist making a genuine commitment to conduct therapy first and foremost for the benefit of the client, not the benefit of society, the client's family, the therapist, or any other party.

==== Agent ====
For SDT, like many philosophical traditions, to be an agent is to occupy a position of control, albeit imperfect, over one's behavior. It is to be an author and a chooser of that behavior—an individual who is capable of entertaining behavioral options, selecting from among them, and enacting the behavior selected. Such a status contrasts with ones in which, for example, clients view themselves as powerless, determined pawns of historical, characterological, biological, environmental, or other forces.

==== Entitled to the benefit of the doubt ====
The status dynamic policy in this regard is that the client be regarded and treated, a priori, as one who is to be given the benefit of the doubt when a choice exists between (at least) equally realistic but unequally accrediting views of that client.

==== Possessor of strengths and resources ====
The SDT policy here is that the therapist take it a priori that each client possesses strengths and resources—that they possess enabling abilities, traits, knowledge, values, roles, past successes, and/or positions of leverage. The therapeutic task becomes one, then, of recognizing and utilizing these strengths and resources, not of determining whether or not they exist. This perspective is a mainstay in the therapy of Milton H. Erickson and in solution focused brief therapy.

==== Acting on a priori status assignments ====
According to SDT adherents, the force of the above a priori status assignments lies principally, not in verbalizing them, but in treating clients in accord with them. They maintain in this regard that "actions speak louder than words." That is, the therapist sees to it, to the degree that they are able, that in this relationship the client is accepted, does make sense, is important, and so forth. Many further details of this status dynamic conception of the positive therapeutic relationship may be found in.

=== Assigning empirically based statuses ===
In addition to the a priori status assignments detailed in the previous section, status dynamic therapists make many further ones based on the observed facts of the case. Their essential strategy here is to assess these facts and actively search for enabling, empowering statuses that can be utilized to bring about changes in the client's problems. As a rule, they maintain, these will be positions that the client already occupies but has neither recognized nor exploited. At other times, they will be new positions that the client does not already occupy, but could. The thrust of therapy then becomes one of either getting the client to recognize the preexisting status or to occupy the new one, and to use the behavior potential inherent in this status to achieve therapeutic change. Among the many applications of this general idea, two will be related briefly here, those of

- changing clients' self-concepts and of
- placing them in more powerful positions in relation to their presenting problems.

==== Changing self-concepts ====
The status dynamic view maintains that the self-concept is most usefully identified, not with an organized summary of myriad perceived facts about oneself (the traditional view), but with one's summary formulation of one's status. That is, it is one's overall conception of one's place or position in relation to all of the elements in one's world, including oneself. A favorite heuristic employed by status dynamic adherents to illustrate this point is a Peanuts cartoon in which Charlie Brown laments that he is unable to initiate a relationship with a little girl on the playground because "I'm a nothing and she's a something." He goes on to relate that, if he were a "something," or she a "nothing," he could pursue her, but that, since "nothings" cannot hope to succeed with "somethings," he could not pursue her. In this example, Charlie provides a simplified illustration of the self-concept as a summary formulation of one's status ("nothing" existing in a world composed of "somethings" and "nothings"), and illustrates, according to SDT, how what is fundamental about self-concepts is not that they are informational summaries of myriad facts about oneself, but that they are self-assigned statuses that place persons somewhere in the scheme of things and carry eligibilities with them.

A well-documented fact about self-concepts is that they are resistant to change, even in the face of what would seem to be disconfirming facts that are recognized by the person. This resistance, SDT maintains, is difficult to explain if the self-concept is conceived as an informational summary. On the status dynamic view, the self-concept is impervious to seemingly contradictory facts because it does not function as an informational entity at all, but instead functions as a positional one. SDT maintains that, so long as one's assignment of a position to someone does not change, there is no way for any new fact to refute one's belief that they occupy that position. In such a situation, there are no refuting facts. An example they employ to illustrate this point is that, if one knows that Tom's position on a baseball team is that of a pitcher, no fact that one discovers about his behavior or accomplishments as a player will disconfirm one's belief that he is a pitcher. The most that any such fact – for example, that he bats .350, or that he does not possess a particularly strong throwing arm – might do is to inform one of something that one finds quite surprising for someone in his position. A more clinical example from the SDT literature is the following: if a man's self-assigned status (self-concept) is that he is an uncaring person, and he perform an act that appears caring and thoughtful – for example, sending a condolence card to a friend who has lost a loved one – for him, this need not count as evidence that he is a caring person. Rather, he will tend to regard it as an uncharacteristic (or questionably motivated, or merely socially obligatory) thing for an uncaring person like him to do. Peter Ossorio, the founder of SDT, has summarized this position in his aphorism that "status takes precedence over fact." Therapeutic implications of this view for helping clients to change their problematic self-concepts are developed in.

==== Repositioning clients to gain control over problems ====
SDT proponents note that many therapy clients hold victim formulations of their problems. These clients, they maintain, conceive their problems in such a way that they see both their source and their resolution as lying outside their personal control. They may see this problem source as something personal such as their own emotions, limitations, irresistible impulses, personal history, nature, or mental illness. Or they may see it as something environmental such as the actions, limitations, or character of another. In either case, seeing themselves as powerless victims, the result is that they cannot envision any actions that they can take to bring about change.

Status dynamic therapists advocate a policy of investigating such client portrayals of the problem to determine if these clients in fact occupy positions of control in relation to this problem. For example, they observe, many clients beset with painfully low self-esteem may be found upon assessment to be the active perpetrators of destructive forms of self-criticism. Many individuals who experience behavioral paralysis and an inability to derive satisfaction in life may be found to be persons who, on the perpetrator end of things, coerce themselves excessively in ego-alien ways, and then rebel against their own oppressive regime of self-governance. Should the status dynamic therapist discover that such positions of control and power exist, their further policy is to endeavor

- to enable the client to recognize this position of control,
- to fully occupy (or "own") this position, and
- to utilize the power inherent in the position to bring about change.

=== Range of application of status dynamic approach ===
To date, status dynamic thinking has been applied to a wide array of human problems. Conceptual formulations and intervention strategies currently exist for schizophrenia, major depressive disorder, mania, paranoia, bulimia, suicide, obsessive-compulsive personality disorder, histrionic personality, impulsive styles, and the paraphilias. Further, status dynamic conceptualizations and intervention strategies have been applied to a large array of cases where clients do not have any Axis I DSM-IV disorder, but are encountering other debilitating problems in living such as incest survivor syndrome, sexual addiction, pathogenic self-criticism, meaninglessness, problems of adolescence, and inability to love. Finally, status dynamic intervention strategies of a general nature have been described in a number of previous publications.

=== Coordinating status dynamics with other approaches ===
SDT adherents maintain that their ideas may be used independently of other approaches, or in conjunction with them. They argue that there is nothing about positioning oneself as a credible status assigner, or creating a therapeutic relationship based on a priori status assignments, or assigning empirically determined statuses and treating clients accordingly, that in any way precludes such well-established therapeutic interventions as cognitive restructuring, behavior rehearsal, the conveyance of new insights, or the alteration of familial transactional patterns. Instead, they maintain, employing status dynamic ideas can serve to enhance the effectiveness of all of these other kinds of interventions.
