= Wynn Schwartz =

American psychologist and psychoanalyst

Wynn R. Schwartz (born 1950) is an American psychologist and psychoanalyst. He is a Lecturer on Psychiatry at Harvard Medical School and teaches in the Harvard Extension School. His work is associated with descriptive psychology and includes writing on the person concept, empathy in psychotherapy, hypnosis and episodic memory, psychoanalytic theory and practice, and dreaming.

== Education and career ==
Schwartz studied at Duke University and received a Ph.D. in clinical and experimental psychology at the University of Colorado Boulder. He trained as a research psychoanalyst at the Boston Psychoanalytic Society and Institute.

Schwartz is a Lecturer on Psychiatry at Harvard Medical School and has taught in the Harvard Extension School. According to Harvard Extension School course materials, he has also taught or held faculty roles at institutions including William James College (formerly the Massachusetts School of Professional Psychology), Wellesley College, the Boston Psychoanalytic Society and Institute, and the Massachusetts Institute of Psychoanalysis. He maintains a private practice in Boston.

Schwartz served as President of the Society for Descriptive Psychology in 2014–2015.

== Work ==
Harvard Extension School materials describe Schwartz's research interests as including empathy and empathic action; dreaming and problem representation; maturation and behavior change; and the role of liberation, improvisation, and play in psychotherapy.

=== Descriptive psychology and the person concept ===
In Descriptive Psychology and the Person Concept: Essential Attributes of Persons and Behavior (2019), Schwartz develops an account of the person concept within the tradition of Descriptive Psychology founded by Peter G. Ossorio. The book was reviewed in the Journal for Person-Oriented Research in 2025.

=== Person concept and nonhuman persons ===
Schwartz has applied the person concept in descriptive psychology to questions about whether nonhuman beings could qualify as persons, including discussions of "other possible persons" such as dolphins, primates, and hypothetical extraterrestrials. In a later paper, he proposes a "paradigm case" formulation as one method for clarifying personhood claims where strict definitions may be difficult to provide.

=== Psychoanalytic theory and practice ===
Schwartz has written about psychoanalysis as a social and clinical practice and has argued for separating psychoanalytic concepts from particular theories, in order to clarify what psychoanalytic work involves in ordinary, pragmatic terms.

=== Empathy and psychotherapy ===
Schwartz has written about empathy in psychotherapy and supervision. In a review of Schwartz's 2019 book, Lars-Gunnar Lundh describes Schwartz as emphasizing perspective-taking and "empathic action" in his treatment of empathy.

In a 2013 chapter, Schwartz proposes a set of "parameters" for describing empathy as it functions in psychotherapy and clinical supervision, treating empathy as a form of socially situated practice rather than a single internal state.

=== Hypnosis and memory ===
Schwartz has published experimental work on hypnosis and episodic memory, including articles on time perception and recall during hypnotic involvement.

=== Dreaming ===
Schwartz has coauthored publications on dreaming and sleep, including work on memory, emotion, and REM sleep and a research-based discussion of the psychoanalytic theory of dreaming.

Schwartz has also written about "problem representation" in dreaming and has argued that dream cognition can be understood as continuous with, and responsive to, a person's current concerns and preoccupations.

== Selected works ==
- Descriptive Psychology and the Person Concept: Essential Attributes of Persons and Behavior (Academic Press, 2019).
- "Politics and religion: Revisiting psychotherapy's third rail" (American Journal of Psychotherapy, 2022).
- "The parameters of empathy: core considerations for psychotherapy and supervision" (Advances in Descriptive Psychology, 2013).
- "What Is a Person and How Can We Be Sure? A Paradigm Case Formulation" (Journal of Evolution and Technology, 2014).
- "Presentations of self and the status dynamics of psychotherapy and supervision" (American Journal of Psychotherapy, 2008).
- "From passivity to competence: A conceptualization of knowledge, skill, tolerance, and empathy" (Psychiatry, 2002).
- "What makes something psychoanalytic?" (Psychiatry, 1988).
- "The problem of other possible persons: Dolphins, primates, and aliens" (Advances in Descriptive Psychology, 1982).
- "Hypnosis and episodic memory" (International Journal of Clinical and Experimental Hypnosis, 1980).
