= Natural person in French law =

French legal term

In French law, a personne physique (lit. ‘physical person’, English: natural person) is a human being who has capacity as a legal person (Personal jurisdiction over international defendants in the United States).

A personne physique is recognized as a subject in law, rather than an object of law such as a thing. A human being with personnalité juridique (personhood) is accordingly the holder of legal rights and Confidentiality towards other persons and towards society as a whole.

A physical person may be compared to a personne morale, in which a group of people in some circumstances is granted a more or less complete judicial capacity (personnalité juridique). Nonetheless, the concept of a personne morale is constructed on the basis of that of a personne physique, and follows similar rules.

The concept of a personne physique is a purely legal abstraction, a judicial fiction. Many authors note that the concept of a human being must be distinguished from that of a physical person. While the two frequently overlap, they are separate. It is judicially possible for a person to be declared legally dead, either voluntarily (civil death) or involuntarily, when a person is declared absent or disappeared. The person may afterwards be legally "resurrected".

Rules concerning the exercise of the rights and obligations that a personnalité juridique confers are derived from the capacité juridique of the physical person. Holding these rights is not the same thing as exercising them. Modern law requires very grave cause before removing from a human being a right, much less a human being's entire judicial capacity. It may however seem appropriate in certain scenarios to limit the exercise of these rights, either temporarily or definitively. This reinforces a feeling of security of the person.

The law of physical persons encompasses the whole of judicial actions concerning their existence, individualisation and attributes. Legal norm deals with matters of birth, death, and cloning. In doing so, it must also answer complex and often difficult ethical questions, to which each civilization and culture responds in its own way, in accordance with its own concept of a human being and the place of a human being in society.

== Natural person in history ==
A legal person is a fundamental legal concept inherited from Roman law and canon law. In the past it was no doubt a concept that separated one man from another rather than one that unified them under a single status. A legal status of personhood (personnalité) also allows human beings to be excluded from this status.

=== Slavery in Roman law ===
Slaves did not have legal personhood in Roman law; they were objects, not subjects, under law. Still, their legal status was different from that of a thing. While they lacked legal personhood, they could have legal capacity, depending on the will of their master.

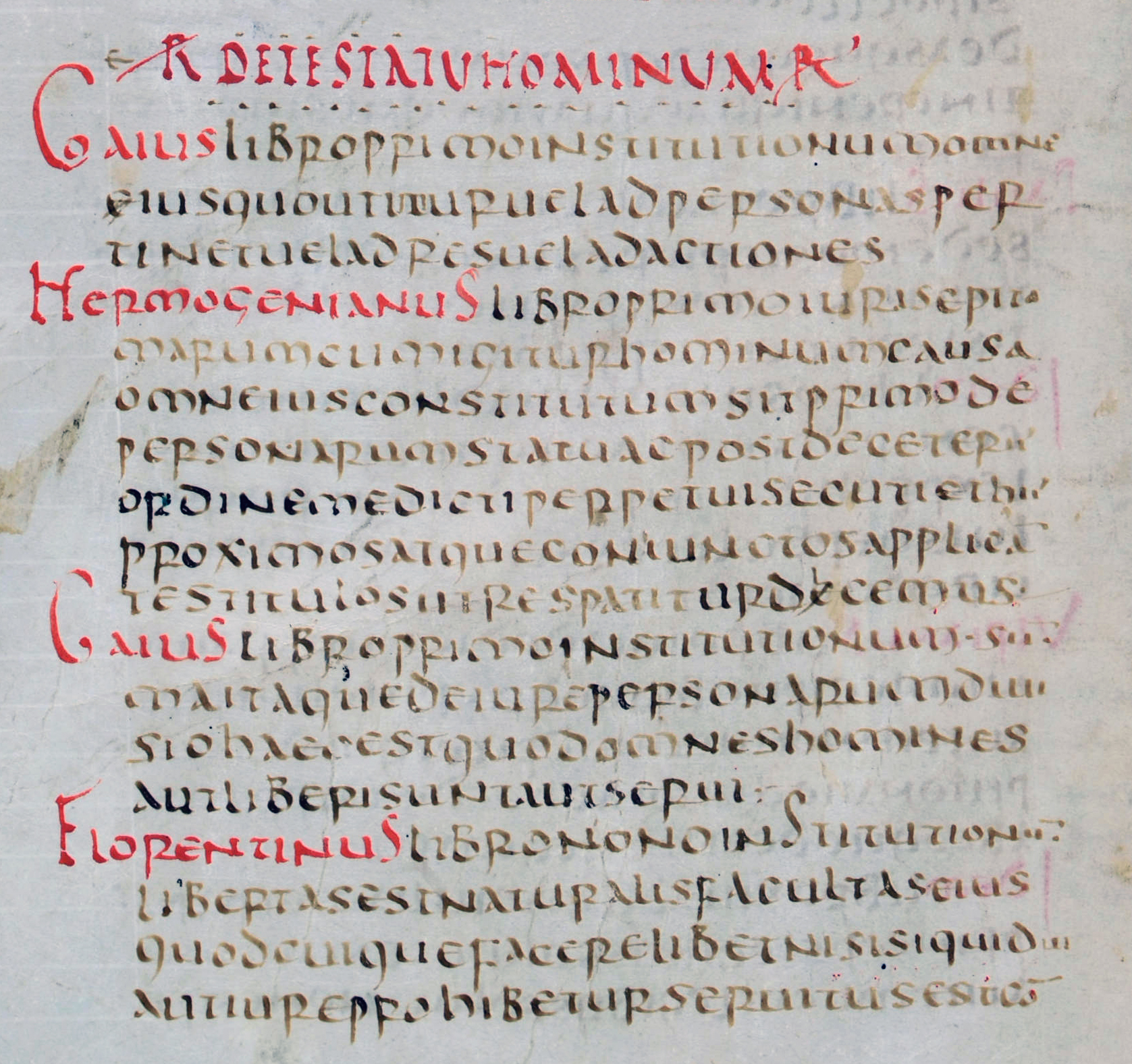
Digest excerpt (1.5.1-4) outlining the basic framework of Roman law—dividing it into persons, things, and actions—and persons into free and slave.

The Corpus Juris Civilis compiled by the Emperor Justinian I enunciated a fundamental principle: the primary distinction in the law of persons is that all men are either free, or slaves. The law of persons therefore must consider slaves, even if legal personhood is not conferred on them. But they are no less human for all that they are not free men. This paradox can be explained by the strong conceptualization of Roman law.

Slavery thus had dual legal dimensions.:

- A slave's body is a thing. A slave had no legal personhood, and could be discussed as merchandise. A slave could not have possessions, seek recourse in justice, or give testimony. He could not marry or legitimize his children. His master could freely dispose of him (sell him, lease him out, use him) and had over him the power of life and death.
- A slave's spirit is human. Even though he lacked legal personhood, a slave could have certain rights, at the discretion of his master. A slave had a right to take a concubine if authorized by his master, and could freely manage any money given to him.

This duality was also reinforced by economic practice. In theory, a slave could be subjected to extreme conditions, since his master had the power of life and death over a slave. However, a slave was an asset and represented human capital. While the master could freely dispose of him, he had an interest in maintaining his slave and providing him with satisfactory working conditions so that he would be productive.

Mutilation and death were only used as a last resort: the death of a slave was a material loss. This ultimate penalty was primarily used to serve as an example to other slaves, notably in Spartacus' Third Servile War (73 to 71 BCE), in which 6000 slaves were crucified.

=== Serfdom in feudal law ===
The slavery of Antiquity gradually disappeared, and was replaced by serfdom, recognized by various local customs. The serf of a lord had an established legal personhood and was the titulary of rights and obligations. Still, a serf's legal capacity remained very limited. Unlike a slave, a serf could not himself be sold, but when the land on which he lived changed hands, so did he.

The codification of the rights of Man extended to other European countries as a result of Napoleonic military campaigns. For example, Constitution of the Duchy of Warsaw abolished serfdom as a reflection of the ideals of the French Revolution, but it did not promote land reform.

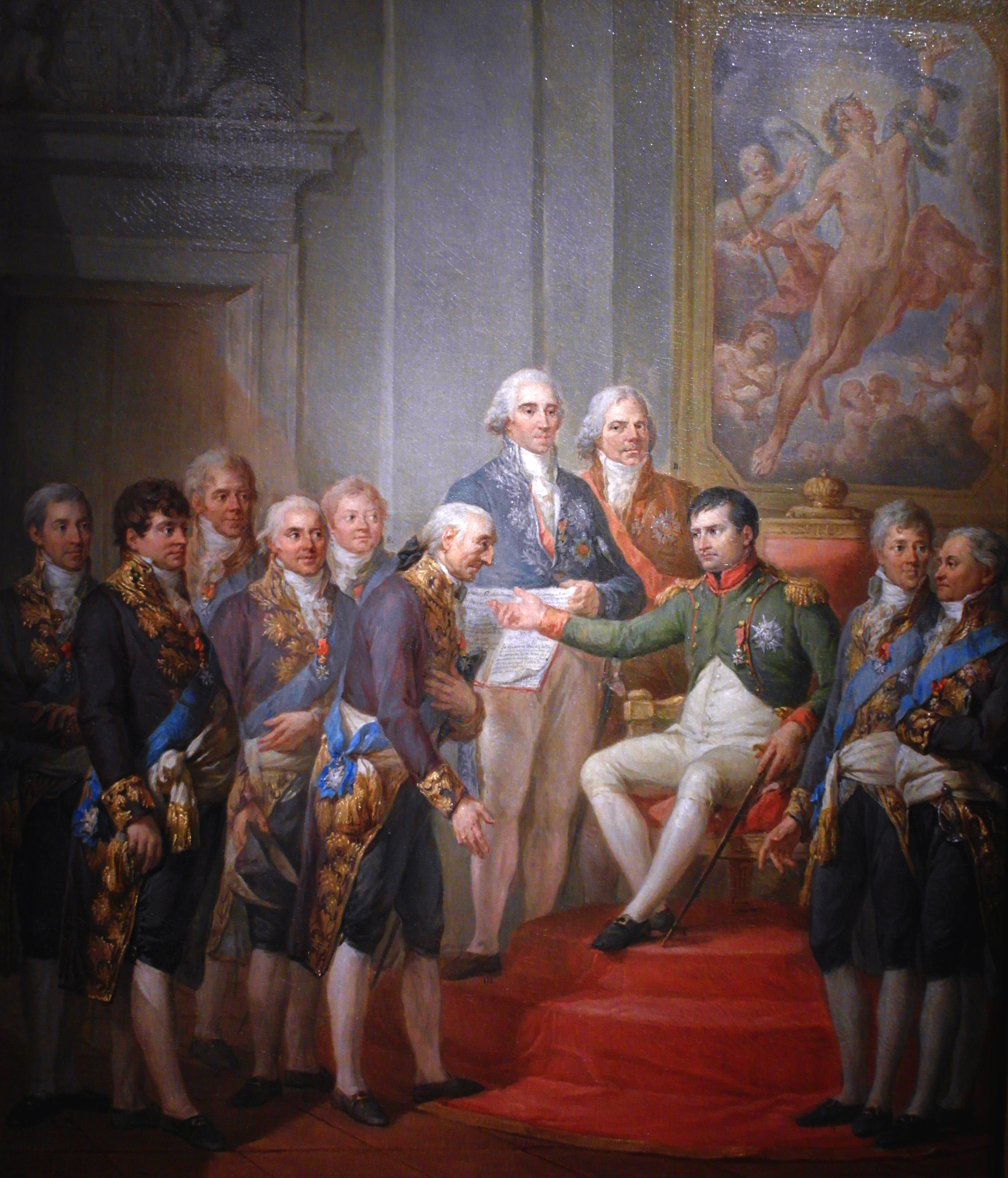
Napoleon Bonaparte establishing the Duchy of Warsaw under French protection, 1807

=== 17th-century slaves and the Code Noir ===
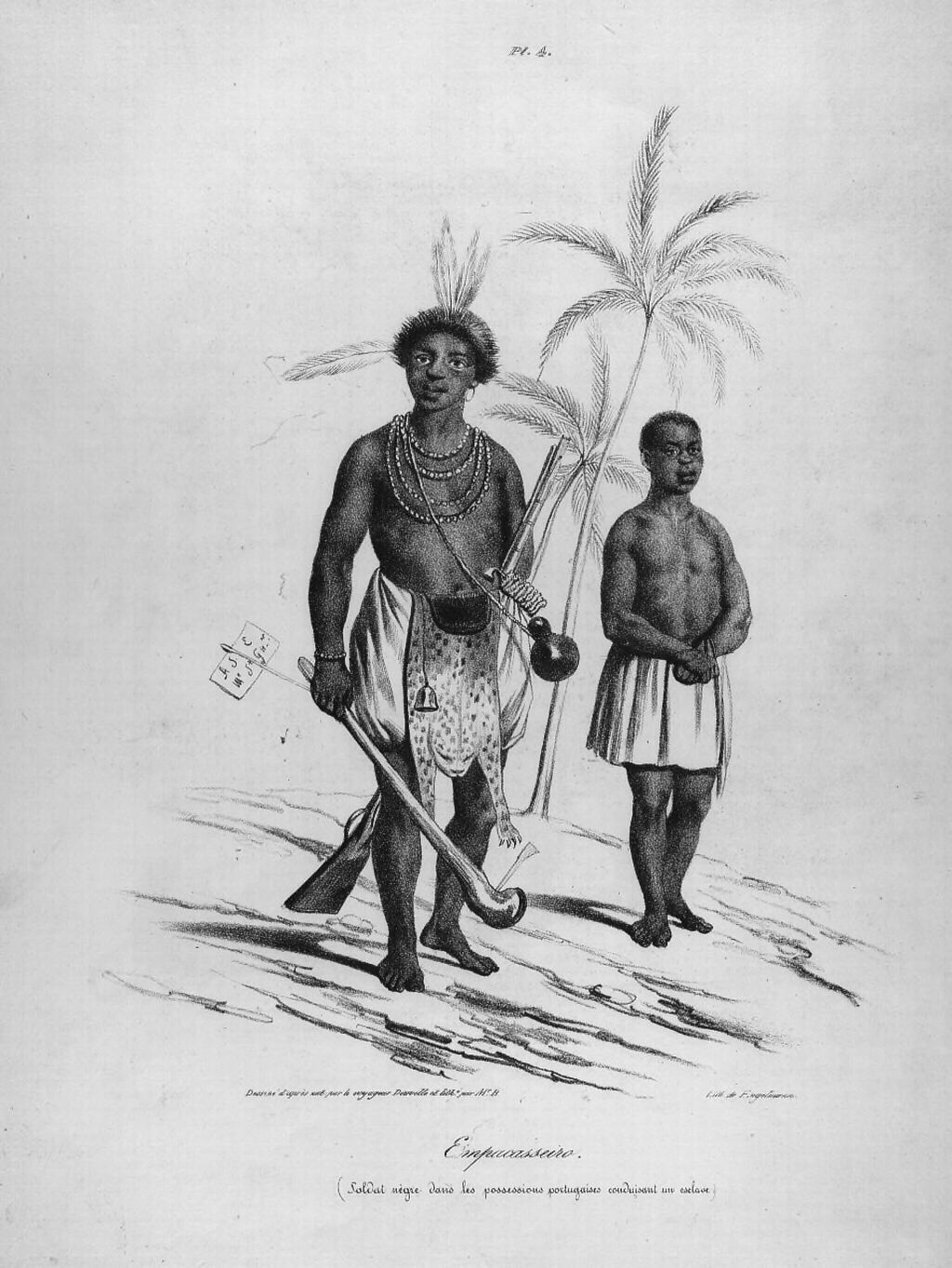
Stamp depicting a soldier and his slave, 1830s

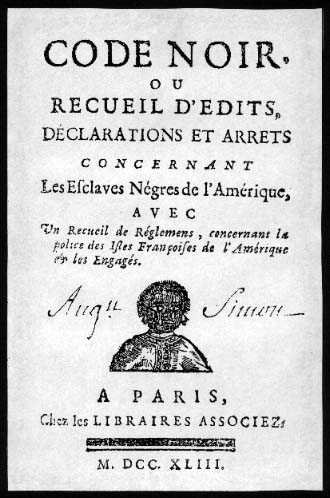
Code noir

In 1685, Louis XIV, king of France, promulgated the first Code noir, regulating the treatment of slaves and maroons in the French Antilles.

The Code Noir in particular declared that slaves were property immune from seizure. Slaves were deprived of legal personhood, although certain provisions were intended to benefit slaves, for example mandatory Christian baptism, and a ban on working on Sundays and religious holidays. The law also provided a formula for freedom in certain circumstances.

The Code Noir regulated punishments, and set up a scale according to the severity of the misdeed. Article 42 forbade masters to mutilate or torture their slaves, limiting them to chaining their slaves and beating them. Runaway slaves were subject to branding, amputation of an ear or hamstringing, or death. The code explicitly confirmed that the child of a female slave was born a slave.

On 4 February 1794, the Convention nationale decreed the abolition of slavery in the Guadeloupe archipelago, but not in Martinique, then occupied by the British, or La Réunion or Mauritius, due to the refusal of the local authorities.

On 30 floréal of year X (1802) the decrees annulling slavery were themselves annulled by Napoleon Bonaparte, which put the Code Noir back into force. It was not until 4 March 1848 that slavery was definitively abolished in France.

=== Civil death until the early 1900s ===
Civil death was the "cessation of all participation in civil rights. It consisted of a legally-pronounced elimination of legal personhood, which carried with it an overall loss of rights. This concept spread across all of Europe through countries that either adopted or were inspired by the Code Napoléon.

Civil death could also be a criminal penalty in France. Until the middle of the 19th century, individuals who were physiologically alive could be considered "dead to the world" and treated in law as if they were. This notably included those sentenced to a peine afflictive et infamante:

- Those condemned to death in absentia, or awaiting execution,
- Those sentenced to forced labour for life,
- The deported.

Civil death could also be a legal fact for members of the clergy, justified by their disengagement from lay society. Lepers, who were particularly dreaded, were also considered civilly dead as of the day they entered a leper colony.

The consequences of civil death were discussed in Article 25 of the Code Napoléon. An individual pronounced legally dead lost his rights of succession, and his assets were seized and distributed to his children. Any will he might have had was annulled, even if written when he held legal capacity under French law, and he immediately became intestate. Since he was considered dead, his marriage was dissolved, and his spouse was free to remarry. Spouses who continued to live with the legally dead did so as concubines, and any future children the couple might have were illegitimate.

While Article 25 did not mention this, anyone who was civilly dead could not be a voter, candidate, functionary, jury member, or expert or fact witness.

Those declared legally dead did retain the right to enter into contracts, which allowed them to earn money, buy, sell, lend or borrow, but when they died, any assets they might have accumulated since their legal death were forfeit to the state.

The Kingdom of Belgium, then under the Code Napoléon, was the first to abolish civil death, in 1831. In France, the law of 8 June 1850 abolished civil death, only for political prisoners sentenced to deportation. The law of 31 May 1854 abolished it altogether. Quebec abolished it later still, in 1906.

=== Recognition of man and natural rights ===
==== American invention ====
The thirteen British colonies in North America, when they declared their independence from Great Britain, to justify their secession, affirmed the universality of the rights and liberties of Man. In June 1776, Virginia created for itself a constitution that gave it the structure of a state:

That all men are by nature equally free and independent, and have certain inherent rights, of which, when they enter into a state of society, they cannot, by any compact, deprive or divest their posterity; namely, the enjoyment of life and liberty, with the means of acquiring and possessing property, and pursuing and obtaining happiness and safety.

— 1776 Virginia Constitution

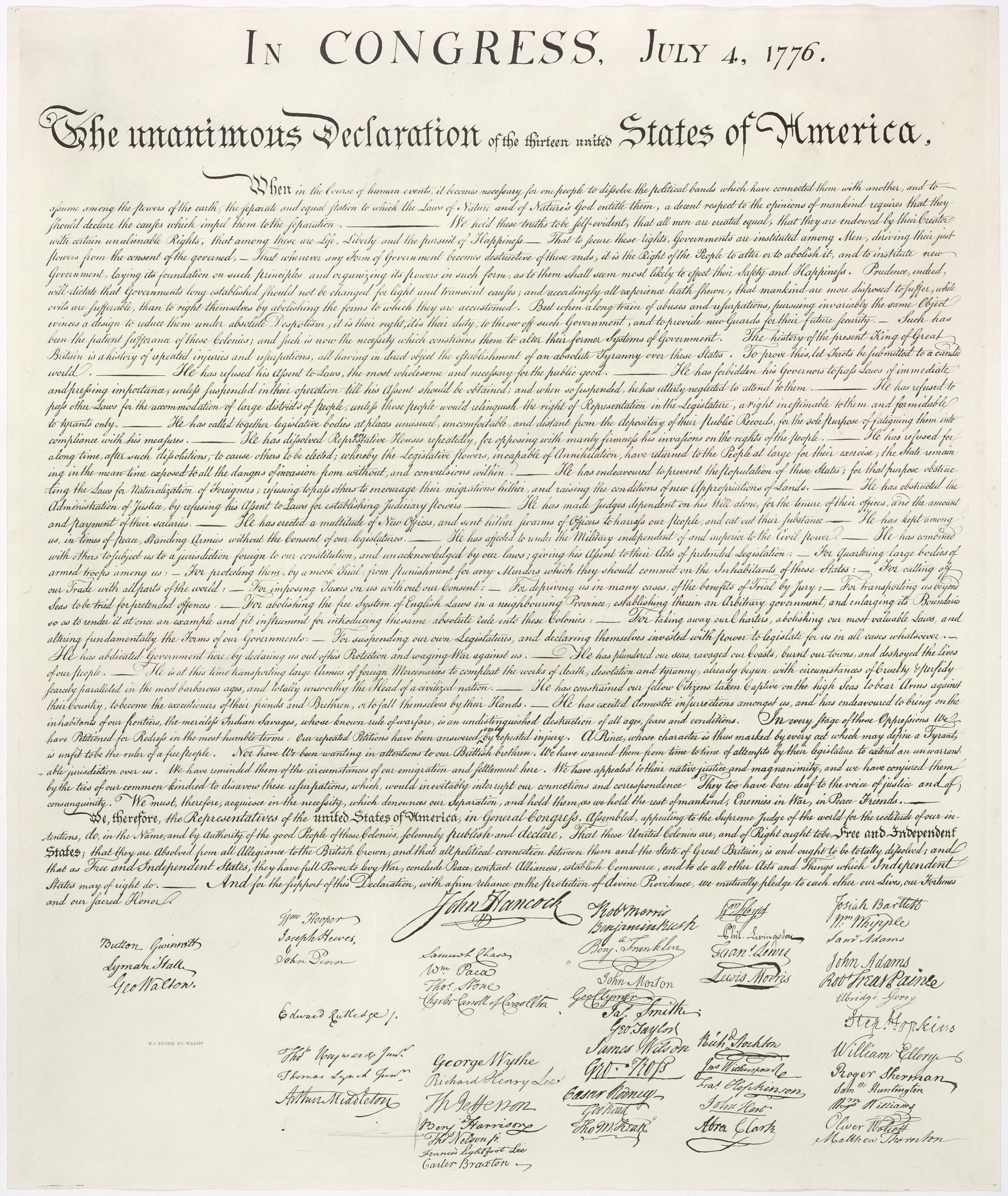
American Declaration of Independence, July 4, 1776

Not content to say that all men have this "emerging legal personhood", this Constitution also enunciated the subjective rights that attach to it, without however precisely delimiting them. It simply refers to "fundamental and natural rights, which men cannot abjure. Notably, it recognized the right to life, to liberty, to safety and thus to protection of the person, the right to property and to happiness.

The United States Declaration of Independence, dated 4 July 1776, of the thirteen colonies become states, affirms the same values:

We hold these truths to be self-evident, that all men are created equal, that they are endowed by their Creator with certain unalienable Rights, that among these are Life, Liberty and the pursuit of Happiness.

The ten Amendments to the Constitution of 1787 guaranteed the rights of Man: freedom of expression and of religion, to carry arms, to safety of the person, an independent judiciary (jury of peers), freedom from self-incrimination in criminal proceedings, the requirement for a single conviction only for the same crime (non bis in idem), a requirement for a legality of procedure (process of laws) in any jeopardy to liberty or to assets.

Given the relative freedom of interpretation allowed, the judiciary, when it emerged as a protector of individual liberties, was able to add to the list of these "fundamental rights", similar to the rights of modern legal personhood. The Supreme Court of the United States, which in an 1803 decision (Marbury v. Madison) assigned itself the power to review the constitutionality of legislation, had as its mission the protection of individual liberties from the public authorities.

==== Extension to France ====
The Déclaration des Droits de l'homme et du citoyen de 1789 (Declaration of the Rights of Man and Citizen (1789)) at the dawn of the French Revolution on 26 August 1789 was more or less contemporary to the American Declaration of Independence. It too was rooted in the idea that men were born and remained free with the same rights, and affirmed the fundamental rights of Man: personal freedom, safety, freedom of opinion and of expression, consent to taxation and equality before the law, and ownership of property as an inviolable and sacred right.

Originally drafted by the Marquis de Lafayette, and influenced by the doctrine of natural rights, it holds the rights of man to be universal, valid at all times and in all places. It is included in the preamble to the constitutions of both the French Fourth Republic (1946) and Fifth Republic (1958) as fundamental French constitutional law.

== Natural person in positive law ==
Today in modern legal systems, all human beings have legal personhood, which is in principle acquired at birth and lost at death. Still, the exact boundary between person and thing tends to blur. The embryo is, more and more, considered a "potential human person" endowed with certain rights, who cannot be considered property, even those of who conceived him. Also, the dead retain a certain amount of protection.

At times difficulties have arisen in defining precisely, legally and in the abstract, either birth or death, which have required the intervention of the legislative or judicial powers to refine these definitions.

=== Acquisition of personhood ===
A problem which has long raised legal and ethical questions is the acquisition of personhood.

==== Criteria ====
In principle legal personhood begins at the moment when a child is born, alive, and viable. These principles have been enunciated by the World Health Organization, with the possibility for member states of the United Nations to incorporate them into their own positive law, taking into account local particularities and ethical points of view that may diverge.

== See also ==
- Juridical person
- History of serfdom
- La Mulâtresse Solitude
- Legal person
- Jurisprudence of Catholic canon law
