= Constitution of the Duchy of Warsaw =

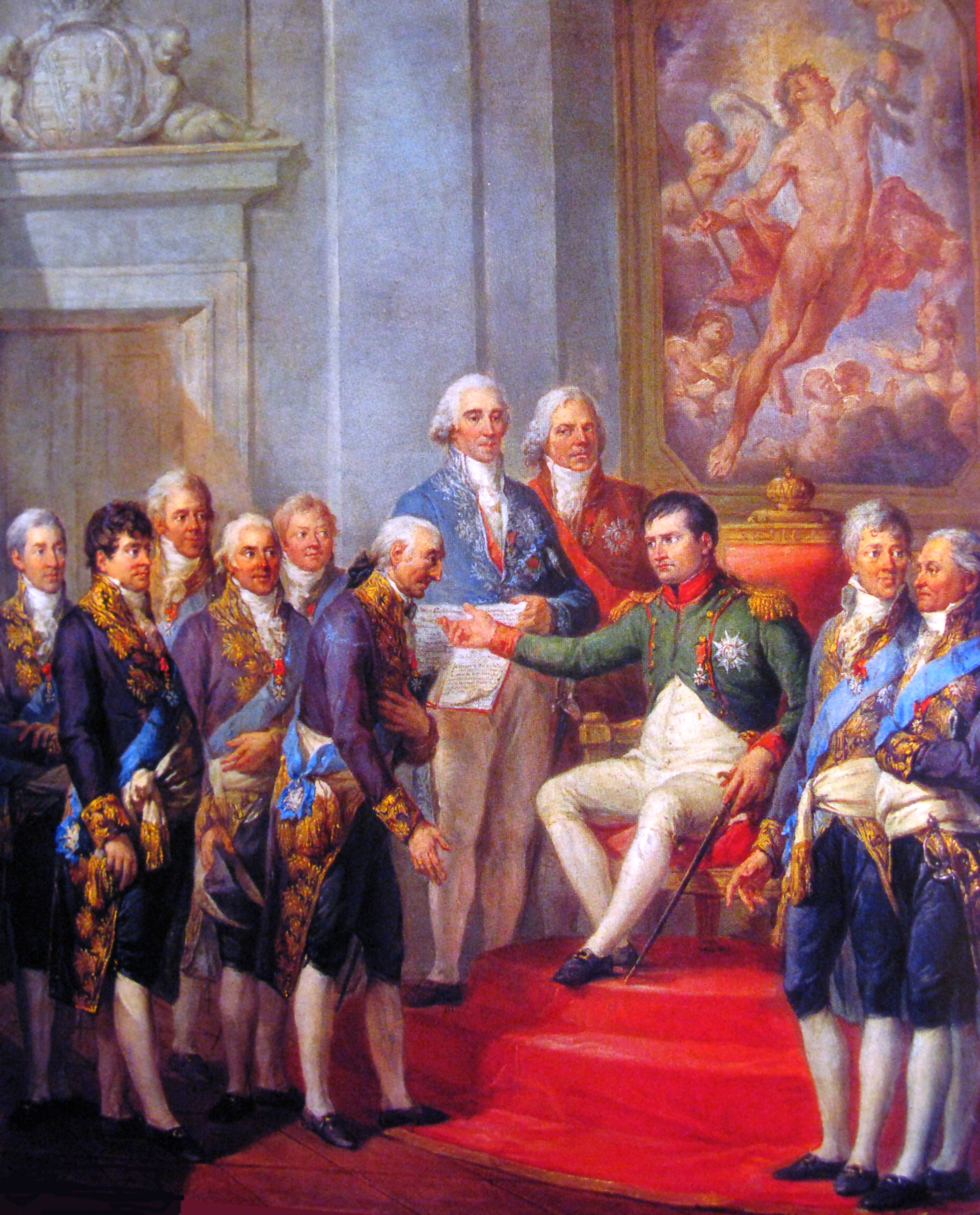
- Napoleon issuing the Constitution of the Duchy of Warsaw by Marcello Bacciarelli (1811)
- Original title: (in Polish) Konstytucja Księstwa Warszawskiego
- Created: 22 July 1807
- Signatories: Napoleon
- Media type: Constitution

The Constitution of the Duchy of Warsaw was promulgated by Napoleon on 22 July 1807 in Dresden. Together with the Napoleonic Code it was a significant reform of Polish law and government in the new Duchy of Warsaw. The constitution provided for a bicameral Sejm and a Council of Ministers. The new laws abolished serfdom and legal distinctions by social class (nobility, peasantry, townsfolk) and introduced the principle that all people are equal before the law. It was considered a liberal constitution for its time. Individual liberty was guaranteed.

The Duchy of Warsaw was a satellite state of France, with no foreign policy of its own. King Frederick Augustus I of Saxony became Duke of Warsaw, and had control over diplomacy; a French representative was to reside in Warsaw and had significant influence over the Duchy's government. The army of the Duchy of Warsaw was subordinate to the French Army.

The granting of the constitution by Napoleon was rendered into painting by Marcello Bacciarelli, but the scene shown in the painting is likely fictionalized.

== See also ==
- Natural person in French law
