= Peter G. Ossorio =

American psychologist (1926–2007)

- Born: May 4, 1926; Los Angeles, California
- Died: April 24, 2007 (aged 80); Boulder, Colorado

Education
- Academic advisor: Rudolf Carnap

Philosophical work
- School: Descriptive psychology

Peter G. Ossorio (4 May 1926 – 24 April 2007) was an American psychologist best known for his development of descriptive psychology, a pragmatic and theory neutral pre-empirical approach to the study of behavior. Ossorio in his 2006 volume, The Behavior of Persons, explicated the concept of "Persons" by creating a conceptual map of the interdependent concepts of "Individual Person", "Language", "Action", and "Reality". He described persons as individuals whose history is, paradigmatically, a history of Deliberate Action in a dramaturgical pattern.

== Background ==
Peter G. Ossorio was born on May 4, 1926, in Los Angeles CA as the youngest of six children. The family was highly intellectual and all six children earned college degrees. His oldest brother, Abel G Ossorio, was the first Hispanic Ph.D. in clinical psychology, receiving his degree from UC-Berkeley in 1958. Peter attended UCLA as an undergraduate after serving time in the US Army. While in graduate school in clinical psychology, he took course work in philosophy with Rudolf Carnap and other members of the department</interview with P. G. Ossorio>. He also became familiar with automata theory and was a proficient computer programmer. At UCLA, he worked closely with Comrey who was a master of factor analytic technique and became adept in their use and his own programming of required procedure. He moved to the University of Colorado in 1961 and the clinical psychology faculty in Boulder where he taught, supervised, mentored, wrote and conducted research for his entire academic career, and where he founded a discipline that came to be known as "descriptive psychology." Much of his research was funded by government agencies and businesses rather than the normal route of NIMH and NSF. He submitted successful contract proposals through his several business, including the Linguistic Research Institute, Ellery Systems, and Global Commerce Systems.

His publications are extensive, and he is widely recognized for creating descriptive psychology, a unique and systematic approach to understanding persons and their behavior. Descriptive psychology has been used by professionals around the world to solve problems in the fields of artificial intelligence, astronomy, business, computer science, psychology, spirituality, and others.

== Development of descriptive psychology ==
=== Persons, 1966 ===
When Ossorio entered academia, the prevailing idea was that psychology was a strictly empirical venture whose task it was to state empirically verifiable theories and then test them with experimental or other empirical procedures. Following an insight of Carnap that "meaning precedes truth," he pointed out that a conceptual framework is required before one can state empirically testable propositions. Such frameworks are pre-empirical; they are descriptive frameworks for the identification of a subject matter and are not themselves open to verification because they are concepts or distinctions—not propositions. Ossorio used various examples to make this point. To engage in the game of chess, one must understand the rules of the game, what moves are open to each type of piece (King, Queen, Knight, Rook, Bishop and Pawn), how a game is started, what counts as a check-mate, a draw, etc. With the rules in hand and something to represent the board and the pieces, one can play the game or can develop a theory of successful strategies for the game, study empirically what masters of the game do in specific positions, etc. The rules of the game provide the framework within which the social practices of playing the game can occur and facts can be discovered. Ossorio makes the same kind of point with respect to baseball (Ossorio, 1985). Ossorio's insights about methods in the behavioral sciences were also novel. He operated from a pragmatic paradigm. His ideas about the conduct of research were a direct outgrowth of his formulations of the Person concept, especially the notions of deliberate action, significance, and acting as a member of a community. He carefully distinguished the classical Semantic Paradigm of research (theory-hypothesis-operationalization-confirmation) with its focus on empirical truths from his Pragmatic Paradigm (conceptualization-decision-action-vindication), which was concerned with expanding a person or groups’ behavioral potential. Because the Pragmatic Paradigm of research gives a priority to conceptualizations and decisions, Ossorio placed the responsibility on the investigator for the entire course of the research process—including what the implications of the research were for everyday life in the real world. As he observed, there were rules for doing research that guaranteed the relevance or general applicability of one’s research findings.

Ossorio contended that this is not a way which language operates and in order to theoretically assert anything a person must first have a description of it that reliably discriminates it from other things it has the possibility of being but is not. The task of describing accurately is necessary prior to creating theories – and “behavioral science” of the time had no place or method for describing behavior. Ossorio proceeded to articulate the conceptual structure within which descriptions of persons and behavior could be given, and in doing so demonstrated, in a vein similar to Wittgenstein that the clear description of something leaves little more explanation needed.

== Major publications ==
=== Selected sole-authored ===
- Ossorio, P. G. (1966/1995). Persons. The collected works of Peter G. Ossorio, Vol. I. Ann Arbor, MI: Descriptive Psychology Press. (Original work published 1966 as LRI Report No. 3. Los Angeles, CA & Boulder, CO: Linguistic Research Institute.)
- Ossorio, P. G. (1971/1975/1978/2005). “What actually happens”: The representation of real world phenomena. The collected works of Peter G. Ossorio, Vol. IV. Ann Arbor, MI: Descriptive Psychology Press. Also published Columbia, SC: University of South Carolina Press, 1975, 1978. (Original work published 1971 as LRI Report No. 10a. Whittier, CA & Boulder, CO: Linguistic Research Institute.
- Ossorio, P. G. (1986/1997). Three-minute lectures on emotion. In Essays on clinical topics. The collected works of Peter G. Ossorio, Vol. II (pp. 99–128). Ann Arbor, MI: Descriptive Psychology Press. (Original work published 1986 as LRI Report No. 36a. Boulder, CO: Linguistic Research Institute.)
- Ossorio, P. G. (1986/1997). More three-minute lectures on emotion. In Essays on clinical topics. The collected works of Peter G. Ossorio, Vol. II (pp. 131–161). Ann Arbor, MI: Descriptive Psychology Press. (Original work published 1986 as LRI Report No. 36b. Boulder, CO: Linguistic Research Institute.)
- Ossorio, P. G. (1997). Essays on clinical topics. The collected works of Peter G. Ossorio, Vol. II. Ann Arbor, MI: Descriptive Psychology Press.
- Ossorio, P. G. (2006). The behavior of persons. The collected works of Peter G. Ossorio, Vol. V. Ann Arbor, MI: Descriptive Psychology Press.

== See also ==
- Status dynamic psychotherapy
