= Descriptive psychology =

Conceptual framework in psychology

Descriptive psychology is primarily a conceptual framework for the science of psychology. Created in its original form by Peter G. Ossorio at the University of Colorado at Boulder in the mid-1960s, it has subsequently been applied to domains such as psychotherapy, artificial intelligence, organizational communities, spirituality, research methodology, and theory creation.

== The nature of descriptive psychology ==
The original impulse for the creation of DP was dissatisfaction with mainstream approaches to the science of psychology, thinking that psychology had paid insufficient attention to the creation of a foundational conceptual framework such as other sciences possessed. Later authors noted that this lack of a conceptual scaffolding was responsible for the fragmentation of psychology; i.e. for its lack of any unifying, broadly accepted "standard model."
