= List of California ballot propositions: 2020–2029 =

This is a list of California ballot propositions from 2020 to 2029.

== Years ==
=== 2020 ===
March 3, 2020
| No. | Result | Description | Cit. |
|---|---|---|---|
| 13 | Failed | Public Preschool, K–12, and College Health and Safety Bond Act of 2020. Authorizes the issuance of $15 billion in bonds to finance capital improvements for public and charter schools statewide. | |

November 3, 2020
| No. | Result | Description | Cit. |
|---|---|---|---|
| 14 | Passed | Authorizes state bonds to be issued to the California Institute for Regenerative Medicine to continue stem cell research. | |
| 15 | Failed | Schools and Communities First Initiative. Provides new funding for public schools, community colleges, and local government services by raising taxes on large commercial properties. | |
| 16 | Failed | Allows government institutions to consider race, sex, or ethnicity in areas of public employment, public contracting, and public education, effectively allowing affirmative action in the public sector. | |
| 17 | Passed | Allows people who are on parole to vote and run for public office. | |
| 18 | Failed | Allows 17-year-olds to vote in primary and special elections if they will turn 18 by the subsequent general election. | |
| 19 | Passed | Increases the property tax burden on owners of inherited property in favor of providing expanded property tax benefits to homeowners ages 55 years and older, disabled homeowners, and victims of wildfires and natural disasters. | |
| 20 | Failed | Adds more crimes to the list of non-violent felonies for which early parole is restricted, and requires DNA collection for certain misdemeanors. | |
| 21 | Failed | Allow local governments to establish rent control on residential properties that have been occupied for over 15 years and allows landlords who own no more than two homes to exempt themselves from such policies. | |
| 22 | Passed | Grants app-based transportation and delivery companies an exception to Assembly Bill 5 by classifying their drivers as "independent contractors", rather than "employees," thereby exempting employers from providing certain mandated employee benefits. | |
| 23 | Failed | Protect the Lives of Dialysis Patients Act Initiative. Increases regulations in dialysis clinics, requiring on-site physicians during treatment, report data on infections potentially caused by dialyses, seek permission prior to closing a clinic, and strengthening anti-discrimination protections for patients. | |
| 24 | Passed | California Privacy Rights Act of 2020. Allows consumers to prevent businesses from sharing their personal data, correct inaccurate personal data, and limit businesses' usage of "sensitive personal information." Creates the California Privacy Protection Agency as a dedicated agency to implement and enforce state privacy laws, investigate violations, and assess penalties of violators. | |
| 25 | Failed | Referendum to overturn a 2018 law that replaced the money bail system with a system based on public safety risk. | |

=== 2022 ===
Propositions in 2022 only appeared on the general election ballot.

November 8, 2022
| No. | Result | Description | Cit. |
|---|---|---|---|
| 1 | Passed | Right to Reproductive Freedom Amendment. Adds a reproductive freedom right to the Constitution of California. | |
| 26 | Failed | Legalizes sports betting at Native American casinos and licensed racetracks in California. | |
| 27 | Failed | Legalizes online and mobile sports wagering that are only offered by federally recognized Native American tribes and those eligible businesses that contract with them. | |
| 28 | Passed | Provides additional funding for arts and music education in K–12 public schools. | |
| 29 | Failed | Requires on-site licensed medical professionals at kidney dialysis clinics, among others requirements. | |
| 30 | Failed | Increases taxes on personal incomes over $2 million to fund programs to reduce greenhouse gas emissions. | |
| 31 | Passed | A referendum on a 2020 law that prohibits the retail sale of certain flavored tobacco products. | |

=== 2024 ===
March 5, 2024
| No. | Result | Description | Cit. |
|---|---|---|---|
| 1 | Passed | Authorizes the issuance of $6.38 billion in bonds to build mental health treatment facilities, as well as fund housing for veterans and homeless individuals. Shifts about $140 million of annual existing tax revenue for existing mental health, drug, and alcohol treatment care from the counties to the state | |

November 5, 2024
| No. | Result | Description | Cit. |
|---|---|---|---|
| 2 | Passed | Authorizes the issuance of $10 billion in bonds to fund construction and upgrades to public schools and colleges. | |
| 3 | Passed | Repeals 2008 California Proposition 8 and declares in the state constitution that the "right to marry is a fundamental right", effectively allowing same-sex couples to once again marry. | |
| 4 | Passed | Authorizes the issuance of $10 billion in bonds to fund various water infrastructure, energy, and environmental protection projects. | |
| 5 | Failed | Lowers the supermajority vote requirement from 66.67% to 55% for any county or local bond measure that would fund affordable housing projects and public infrastructure. | |
| 6 | Failed | Repeal the line in the state constitution saying, "Involuntary servitude is prohibited except to punish crime", replacing it with language saying that involuntary servitude is prohibited absolutely. | |
| 32 | Failed | Raises the state minimum wage to $18 per hour by 2026, then annually adjusts it for inflation. | |
| 33 | Failed | Repeals the Costa–Hawkins Rental Housing Act of 1995, allowing cities to once again establish their own rent controls on single-family dwellings, condominiums, and residential properties completed after February 1, 1995. | |
| 34 | Passed | Requires health care providers that have spent over $100 million in any 10-year period on anything other than direct patient care, and operated multifamily housing with over 500 high-severity health and safety violations, to spend 98% of the revenues from federal discount prescription drug program on direct patient care. | |
| 35 | Passed | Makes permanent the existing tax on managed health care insurance plans, currently set to expire in 2026. It would also require the revenues generated by the tax to only be used for specified Medi-Cal services, and prohibit the revenue from being used to replace other existing Medi-Cal funding. | |
| 36 | Passed | Increases the penalties and sentences for certain drug and theft crimes from being only chargeable as misdemeanors. It would allow, among others, felony charges for possessing fentanyl and other certain drugs, and for thefts under $950, with two prior drug or theft convictions, respectively. | |

=== 2025 ===
November 4, 2025 (special election)
| No. | Result | Description | Cit. |
|---|---|---|---|
| 50 | Passed | Replaces the California Citizens Redistricting Commission's congressional district map in favor of a Democratic-favoring gerrymandered one drafted by the California State Legislature in response to the Republican-favoring 2025 Texas redistricting. The state legislature's map would be in effect from the 2026 elections to the 2030 elections. In 2030, redistricting authority would return to the commission for the 2032 election. | |

=== 2026 ===
Propositions in 2026 only appeared on the general election ballot.

November 3, 2026
| No. | Result | Description | Cit. |
|---|---|---|---|
| 1 | TBA | Issues $11.25 billion in bonds to fund Multifamily Housing Program, CalVet Home Loan Program, and youth housing. | |
| 2 | TBA | Increases the Budget Stabilization Account (BSA) cap from 10% of general fund revenue to 20% and excluding deposits into the BSA from the Gann Limit. | |
| 3 | TBA | Amends the state constitution to indefinitely extend the top marginal tax rates set to expire in 2031 on single filers earning at least $361,000 or joint filers earning at least $721,000, with 89% of revenue allocated to K–12 schools and 11% to community colleges. | |
| 4 | TBA | Repeals the 1988 ban on public financing of campaigns and allow for state and local governments to create programs that provide candidates with public funds under spending limits and eligibility rules. | |
| 5 | TBA | Amends the state constitution to eliminate the election of a successor when a state officer is recalled, thereby leaving the office vacant until it is filled according to state law; allows for the recalled officer to run again for the same office at the special election, if one is held; and authorizes the lieutenant governor to fill the gubernatorial vacancy until the expired term, unless the vacancy occurred before the close of the nomination period for the next statewide election during the first two years of the governor's term, in which a special election would be called and which the winner would serve the remainder of the term. | |
| 37 | TBA | Establishes a second mortgage homebuyer program for qualified homebuyers on qualifying homes administered by the California Housing Finance Agency (CalHFA), and authorize the CalHFA to issue up to $25 billion in bonds to fund the program. The second mortgages would cover up to 17% of the home's price for those making a down payment of at least 3%. | |
| 38 | TBA | Authorizes the state to issue $8.4 billion in general obligation bonds to fund immunology and immunotherapy research; establish an Immunology and Immunotherapy Research Institute affiliated with the University of California; and awards grants to California-based public and nonprofit medical research institutions for immunology and immunotherapy research. | |
| 39 | TBA | Requires voters to designate a government-issued ID when registering to vote, and to present that ID for in-person voting or provide the last four digits for mail-in ballots; requires election officials to "maintain accurate voter registration lists [and]... use best efforts to verify citizenship attestations using government data" and to report each year the percentage of each county's voter rolls that have been citizenship-verified; and requires the State Auditor to audit government compliance with these requirements during odd-numbered years and report "findings and recommendations for improving the integrity of elections to the public." | |
| 40 | TBA | Levies a one-time 5% tax on the accumulated wealth, including shares of capital stock, bonds or other evidences of indebtedness, and any legal or equitable interest, of billionaires in the state to fund state-funded health care programs, such as Medi-Cal, and state food assistance and public education. | |
| 41 | TBA | Requires pre-election audits for ballot initiatives proposing special taxes once they report collecting 25% of signatures to be included in the voter information pamphlet if it qualifies for the ballot; requires state laws or ballot initiatives levying a new special tax enacted after January 1, 2026, to undergo state audits every four years to determine program effectiveness and cost-saving measures; and prohibits the state from enforcing any tax that is exempted or excluded from the state spending limit enacted or effective on or after January 1, 2026. | |
| 42 | TBA | Prohibits the enactment of new taxes after January 1, 2026, on ownership or control of retirement holdings, individually-owned assets, and other forms of personal savings, and retroactive taxes that result in a tax liability based on conduct, activities, or a status that occurred or were present prior to the effective date of the tax. | |
| 43 | TBA | Closes court-created loophole by restoring the two-thirds voter approval requirement for special taxes under Proposition 13 to once again include special taxes placed on the ballot under the initiative power. | |
| 44 | TBA | Requires nonprofit Federally Qualified Health Centers (FQHCs) and FQHC Look-Alikes to spend at least 90% of their annual total revenue on expenses that advance the health center's mission. | |
| 45 | TBA | Makes changes to the California Environmental Quality Act to establish deadlines for public agencies to complete environmental review and take required actions for projects deemed essential under the law, limits public agencies' existing requirement to consider a range of project alternatives to reduce environmental impacts, and changes the court review process for project approvals by setting deadlines for filing and resolving lawsuits and limiting the evidence and relief the court can consider and order. | |
