= 2026 California elections =

- November 3, 2026

The 2026 California general election took place on November 3, 2026. The statewide direct primary election was held on June 2.

California voters will elect all of California's seats to the United States House of Representatives, all of the seats of the California State Assembly, all even-numbered seats of the California State Senate, and the Governor of California and various statewide offices.

Pursuant to Proposition 14 passed in 2010, California uses a nonpartisan primary for its races. All the candidates for the same elected office, regardless of respective political party, run against each other during the primary. The candidates receiving the most and second-most votes in the primary election then become the contestants in the general election.

== United States Congress ==
=== House ===
All of California's 52 seats to the United States House of Representatives will be up for election to two-year terms. They will be using the redrawn district maps under the voter-approved Proposition 50. Three members of Congress have chosen not to run for re-election, including former House Speaker Nancy Pelosi.

Additionally, two special elections were held in 2026. In California's 1st congressional district, James Gallagher was elected on June 2 to succeed the late Doug LaMalfa. In California's 14th congressional district, Aisha Wahab was elected on August 18 to succeed Eric Swalwell, who resigned amid allegations of sexual misconduct.

== Statewide constitutional offices ==
=== Governor ===
Incumbent Democratic Governor Gavin Newsom is term-limited and ineligible to seek reelection. Former U.S. Secretary of Health and Human Services Xavier Becerra and political commentator and former policy adviser to UK prime minister David Cameron Steve Hilton advanced to the general election to succeed him.

Gubernatorial election
Primary election
| Party | Candidate | Votes | % |
|---|---|---|---|
| Democratic | Xavier Becerra | 2,591,857 | 27.98 |
| Republican | Steve Hilton | 2,277,318 | 24.59 |
| Democratic | Tom Steyer | 2,110,707 | 22.79 |
| Republican | Chad Bianco | 941,708 | 10.17 |
| Democratic | Katie Porter | 403,908 | 4.36 |
| Democratic | Matt Mahan | 327,537 | 3.54 |
| Democratic | Antonio Villaraigosa | 104,107 | 1.12 |
| Democratic | Tony Thurmond | 63,762 | 0.69 |
| Peace and Freedom | Ramsey Robinson | 51,803 | 0.56 |
| Democratic | Betty Yee (withdrawn) | 40,873 | 0.44 |
| Democratic | Eric Swalwell (withdrawn) | 28,164 | 0.30 |
| Republican | Tim Nelson | 23,712 | 0.26 |
| Green | Butch Ware (write-in) | 22,493 | 0.24 |
| Republican | Randeep S. Dhillon | 21,937 | 0.24 |
| Democratic | Barack D. Obama Shaw | 16,716 | 0.18 |
| Democratic | Carolina Buhler | 15,013 | 0.16 |
| Republican | Leo Samuel Zacky | 14,708 | 0.16 |
| Republican | Gretha Solórzano | 12,563 | 0.14 |
| Democratic | Matthew Chase Levy | 11,059 | 0.12 |
| Libertarian | Tom Woodard (withdrawn) | 9,328 | 0.10 |
| Democratic | Erin "Zez" Zezulak | 9,251 | 0.10 |
| Democratic | Louis A. De Barraicua | 8,851 | 0.10 |
| Democratic | Mohammad Arif | 8,458 | 0.09 |
| Republican | Leo Naranjo IV | 8,099 | 0.09 |
| No party preference | Nancy D. Young | 7,012 | 0.08 |
| Republican | James Athans Jr. | 6,633 | 0.07 |
| No party preference | Joseph Cabrera | 6,196 | 0.07 |
| Republican | David Zickefoose | 5,882 | 0.06 |
| Democratic | Satish Rao | 5,668 | 0.06 |
| No party preference | Christine R. Sarmiento | 5,643 | 0.06 |
| No party preference | Jon Henderson | 5,589 | 0.06 |
| Republican | Alicia Olivia Lapp | 5,370 | 0.06 |
| No party preference | Amanda Martin | 5,234 | 0.06 |
| No party preference | Frederic C. Schultz | 5,230 | 0.06 |
| Republican | Rafael M. Hernandez | 5,223 | 0.06 |
| Democratic | Scott P. Shields | 5,043 | 0.05 |
| Democratic | Derek Grasty | 4,994 | 0.05 |
| Democratic | Larry Azevedo | 4,675 | 0.05 |
| No party preference | Elaine Culotti | 4,483 | 0.05 |
| Republican | Patricia De Luca Basualdo | 4,064 | 0.04 |
| No party preference | Mauro Alberto Orozco | 4,052 | 0.04 |
| Democratic | Raji Rab | 3,606 | 0.04 |
| Democratic | Sophia Edum-a-Sam | 3,550 | 0.04 |
| No party preference | Brent Maupin | 3,132 | 0.03 |
| Democratic | Akinyemi Agbede | 3,037 | 0.03 |
| No party preference | Lewis Herms | 2,995 | 0.03 |
| No party preference | Naomi Bar-Lev | 2,744 | 0.03 |
| No party preference | Daniel Mercuri | 2,667 | 0.03 |
| Republican | Ché Ahn (write-in) | 2,419 | 0.03 |
| Democratic | Gary Howard Kidgell | 2,415 | 0.03 |
| Democratic | Joel E. Jacob | 2,350 | 0.03 |
| Democratic | Thunder Parley | 2,320 | 0.03 |
| No party preference | Margaret Trowe | 2,286 | 0.02 |
| No party preference | LivingForGod AndCountry DeMott | 2,206 | 0.02 |
| No party preference | Reza Safarnejad | 1,990 | 0.02 |
| No party preference | Duane Terrence Loynes Jr. | 1,905 | 0.02 |
| No party preference | Don J. Grundmann | 1,903 | 0.02 |
| No party preference | Anne Komarovsk | 1,535 | 0.02 |
| No party preference | Dawit Kellel | 1,360 | 0.01 |
| No party preference | Sam Sandak | 1,222 | 0.01 |
| No party preference | Max Fomin | 842 | 0.01 |
| No party preference | Lukasz Adam Filinski | 527 | 0.01 |
| No party preference | Serge Fiankan | 488 | 0.01 |
| No party preference | Sean Forbes (write-in) | 22 | 0.00 |
| Democratic | Jibri J. Peavy (write-in) | 10 | 0.00 |
| No party preference | Dirk Langer (write-in) | 8 | 0.00 |
| Democratic | Kalid Meky (write-in) | 5 | 0.00 |
| No party preference | Michael J. Dilger (write-in) | 1 | 0.00 |
| Total votes | | 9,262,468 | 100.00 |
General election
| Democratic | Xavier Becerra | | |
| Republican | Steve Hilton | | |
| Total votes | | | |

=== Lieutenant governor ===
Incumbent Democratic Lieutenant Governor Eleni Kounalakis is term-limited and ineligible to seek re-election; she is instead running for state Treasurer. Democratic State Treasurer Fiona Ma and former Republican state Senator Gloria Romero advanced to the general election to succeed her.

Lieutenant gubernatorial election
Primary election
| Party | Candidate | Votes | % |
|---|---|---|---|
| Democratic | Fiona Ma | 1,631,935 | 19.12 |
| Republican | Gloria Romero | 1,521,181 | 17.83 |
| Democratic | Josh Fryday | 1,256,824 | 14.73 |
| Democratic | Michael Tubbs | 1,132,160 | 13.27 |
| Democratic | Oliver Ma | 621,147 | 7.28 |
| Republican | David Collenberg | 594,336 | 6.96 |
| Republican | David Fennell | 521,455 | 6.11 |
| Republican | Skip Shelton | 345,324 | 4.05 |
| Democratic | Janelle Kellman | 311,237 | 3.65 |
| Republican | Ebie Lynch | 156,714 | 1.84 |
| Democratic | Tim Myers | 132,564 | 1.55 |
| Peace and Freedom | Alice Stek | 125,100 | 1.47 |
| Democratic | Jeyson Lopez | 94,058 | 1.10 |
| Democratic | Abdur Rahman Sikder | 51,620 | 0.60 |
| No party preference | Sean Collinson | 24,927 | 0.29 |
| No party preference | Rakesh Christian | 12,870 | 0.15 |
| Republican | James P. Cameron (write-in) | 45 | 0.00 |
| Democratic | Mushtaq MT Tahirkheli (write-in) | 7 | 0.00 |
| Total votes | | 8,533,504 | 100.0 |
General election
| Democratic | Fiona Ma | | |
| Republican | Gloria Romero | | |
| Total votes | | | |

=== Attorney general ===
Incumbent Democratic Attorney General Rob Bonta is running for re-election. He advanced to the general election alongside Republican candidate Michael Gates, the Huntington Beach City Attorney.

Attorney general election
Primary election
| Party | Candidate | Votes | % |
|---|---|---|---|
| Democratic | Rob Bonta (incumbent) | 4,979,967 | 56.62 |
| Republican | Michael Gates | 3,337,433 | 37.94 |
| Green | Marjorie Mikels | 478,450 | 5.44 |
| Total votes | | 8,795,850 | 100.0 |
General election
| Democratic | Rob Bonta (incumbent) | | |
| Republican | Michael Gates | | |
| Total votes | | | |

=== Secretary of state ===
Incumbent Democratic Secretary of State Shirley Weber is running for re-election. She advanced to the general election alongside Republican Orange County Supervisor Donald Wagner.

Secretary of state election
Primary election
| Party | Candidate | Votes | % |
|---|---|---|---|
| Democratic | Shirley Weber (incumbent) | 5,092,491 | 58.70 |
| Republican | Donald P. Wagner | 3,187,180 | 36.74 |
| Green | Michael Feinstein | 207,602 | 2.39 |
| Green | Gary Blenner | 187,925 | 2.17 |
| Total votes | | 8,675,198 | 100.0 |
General election
| Democratic | Shirley Weber (incumbent) | | |
| Republican | Donald P. Wagner | | |
| Total votes | | | |

=== Treasurer ===
Incumbent Democratic Treasurer Fiona Ma is term-limited and ineligible to seek re-election; she is instead running for Lieutenant Governor. Democratic Lieutenant Governor Eleni Kounalakis and Republican former human resources manager Jennifer Hawks advanced to the general election to succeed her.

Treasurer election
Primary election
| Party | Candidate | Votes | % |
|---|---|---|---|
| Democratic | Eleni Kounalakis | 3,154,323 | 36.69 |
| Republican | Jennifer Hawks | 2,063,253 | 24.00 |
| Democratic | Anna Caballero | 1,410,005 | 16.40 |
| Republican | David Serpa | 1,106,595 | 12.87 |
| Democratic | Tony Vazquez | 609,482 | 7.09 |
| Green | Glenn Turner | 254,085 | 2.96 |
| Total votes | | 8,597,743 | 100.0 |
General election
| Democratic | Eleni Kounalakis | | |
| Republican | Jennifer Hawks | | |
| Total votes | | | |

=== Controller ===
Incumbent Democratic Controller Malia Cohen is running for re-election. She advanced to the general election alongside Republican financial advisor Herb Morgan, a former President of the San Diego Employees Retirement System.

Controller election
Primary election
| Party | Candidate | Votes | % |
|---|---|---|---|
| Democratic | Malia Cohen (incumbent) | 4,909,613 | 56.80 |
| Republican | Herb Morgan | 3,244,252 | 37.53 |
| Peace and Freedom | Meghann Adams | 489,663 | 5.67 |
| Total votes | | 8,643,528 | 100.0 |
General election
| Democratic | Malia Cohen (incumbent) | | |
| Republican | Herb Morgan | | |
| Total votes | | | |

=== Insurance Commissioner ===
Incumbent Democratic Insurance Commissioner Ricardo Lara is term-limited and ineligible to seek re-election. Democratic State Senator Ben Allen and Democratic former San Francisco County Supervisor Jane Kim advanced to the general election to succeed him.

Insurance commissioner election
Primary election
| Party | Candidate | Votes | % |
|---|---|---|---|
| Democratic | Jane Kim | 2,328,836 | 27.40 |
| Democratic | Ben Allen | 1,649,501 | 19.41 |
| Republican | Stacy A. Korsgaden | 1,320,966 | 15.54 |
| Republican | Robert P. Howell | 649,093 | 7.64 |
| Democratic | Patrick Wolff | 615,069 | 7.24 |
| Republican | Merritt Farren | 570,669 | 6.71 |
| Republican | Sean Lee | 458,056 | 5.39 |
| Democratic | Steven Bradford | 416,998 | 4.91 |
| Peace and Freedom | Eduardo "Lalo" Vargas | 248,039 | 2.92 |
| Republican | Eric Thor Aarnio | 158,603 | 1.87 |
| American Independent | Keith W. Davis | 83,994 | 0.99 |
| Total votes | | 8,499,824 | 100.0 |
General election
| Democratic | Jane Kim | | |
| Democratic | Ben Allen | | |
| Total votes | | | |

=== Superintendent of Public Instruction ===
Incumbent Democratic Superintendent of Public Instruction Tony Thurmond is term-limited and ineligible to seek re-election; he is instead running for Governor. As no candidate received over 50% of the vote in the first round, Chino School Board President Sonja Shaw and San Diego School Board President Richard Barrera advanced a runoff election.

Superintendent of public instruction election
| Candidate | Votes | % |
|---|---|---|
| Sonja Shaw | 1,737,735 | 22.64 |
| Richard Barrera | 1,558,298 | 20.30 |
| Nichelle M. Henderson | 738,236 | 9.62 |
| Wendy Castaneda Leal | 675,968 | 8.81 |
| Al Muratsuchi | 646,329 | 8.42 |
| Anthony Rendon | 624,266 | 8.13 |
| Frank Lara | 578,171 | 7.53 |
| Josh Newman | 522,758 | 6.81 |
| Ainye Long | 426,104 | 5.55 |
| Gus Mattammal | 167,723 | 2.19 |
| Total votes | 7,675,588 | 100.0 |
Runoff election
| Sonja Shaw | | |
| Richard Barrera | | |
| Total votes | | |

== Board of Equalization ==
All four seats on the California State Board of Equalization are up for election, with three of four incumbents term-limited and ineligible for re-election.

=== District 1 ===
Incumbent Republican Ted Gaines is term-limited and ineligible to seek re-election; he is instead running for the El Dorado County Board of Supervisors. State Senator Shannon Grove and Fresno City Councilman Nelson Esparza are running to succeed him.

California's 1st Board of Equalization district election
Primary election
| Party | Candidate | Votes | % |
|---|---|---|---|
| Republican | Shannon Grove | 672,039 | 34.46 |
| Democratic | Nelson Esparza | 664,072 | 34.05 |
| Democratic | Donald Williamson | 289,781 | 14.86 |
| Republican | Dusty Beach | 238,861 | 12.25 |
| Republican | Nader Shahatit | 85,636 | 4.39 |
| Total votes | | 1,950,389 | 100.0 |
General election
| Republican | Shannon Grove | | |
| Democratic | Nelson Esparza | | |
| Total votes | | | 100.0 |

=== District 2 ===
Incumbent Democrat Sally Lieber is running for re-election. She is being challenged by trustee for the San Mateo County Community College District John Pimentel.

California's 2nd Board of Equalization district election
Primary election
| Party | Candidate | Votes | % |
|---|---|---|---|
| Democratic | Sally Lieber (incumbent) | 1,336,379 | 56.76 |
| Democratic | John Pimentel | 371,920 | 15.80 |
| Republican | Bill Shireman | 259,336 | 11.01 |
| Republican | J. Brett Marymee | 208,311 | 8.85 |
| Republican | Mark McComas | 108,318 | 4.60 |
| Republican | John Zaruka | 70,379 | 2.99 |
| Total votes | | 2,354,643 | 100.0 |
General election
| Democratic | Sally Lieber (incumbent) | | |
| Democratic | John Pimentel | | |
| Total votes | | | 100.0 |

=== District 3 ===
Incumbent Democrat Tony Vazquez is term-limited and ineligible to seek re-election; he is instead running for state Treasurer. State Assemblyman Mike Gipson and labor union organizer Samuel P. Sukaton are running to succeed him.

California's 3rd Board of Equalization district election
Primary election
| Party | Candidate | Votes | % |
|---|---|---|---|
| Democratic | Mike Gipson | 516,324 | 27.88 |
| Democratic | Samuel Sukaton | 337,313 | 18.21 |
| Democratic | Yvonne Yiu | 236,627 | 12.78 |
| Republican | Carlo Basail | 194,323 | 10.49 |
| Republican | Rey Portela | 186,451 | 10.07 |
| Democratic | Rudy Bermudez | 111,616 | 6.03 |
| Republican | Stephan Hohil | 106,141 | 5.73 |
| Democratic | Baru Sanchez | 105,086 | 5.67 |
| No party preference | Marie Manvel | 30,513 | 1.65 |
| Democratic | Zhijing Liu | 27,760 | 1.50 |
| Total votes | | 1,852,154 | 100.0 |
General election
| Democratic | Mike Gipson | | |
| Democratic | Samuel Sukaton | | |
| Total votes | | | |

=== District 4 ===
Incumbent Democrat Mike Schaefer is term-limited and ineligible to seek re-election; he is instead running for congress. Orange City Councilman Denis Bilodeau and state Senator Tom Umberg are running to succeed him.

California's 4th Board of Equalization district election
Primary election
| Party | Candidate | Votes | % |
|---|---|---|---|
| Republican | Denis Bilodeau | 972,838 | 45.06 |
| Democratic | Tom Umberg | 446,715 | 20.69 |
| Democratic | Cody Petterson | 397,057 | 18.39 |
| Democratic | Martin Arias | 308,330 | 14.28 |
| Libertarian | Gardner C. Osborne | 33,860 | 1.57 |
| Total votes | | 2,158,800 | 100.0 |
General election
| Republican | Denis Bilodeau | | |
| Democratic | Tom Umberg | | |
| Total votes | | | |

== State legislature ==
=== State senate ===
Twenty seats from all even-numbered districts in the California State Senate are up for election.

=== State Assembly ===
All eighty seats of the California State Assembly are up for election.

== State propositions ==
Since the enactment of Senate Bill 202 in 2011, only state propositions placed on the ballot by the state legislature may appear in the June primary election, and all measures placed via a petition signed by registered voters are automatically moved to the general election ballot. This year, the state legislature has only placed propositions on the November ballot.

On June 25, 2026, Secretary of State Shirley Weber announced an initial list of propositions that had qualified for and would appear on the November ballot. After legislative negotiations, some measures were added, modified, or removed. 14 measures eventually appeared on the November ballot.

2026 California propositions (November)
| Name | Description | Votes | | | | Type |
| Name | Description | Yes | % | No | % | Type |
|---|---|---|---|---|---|---|
| Proposition 1 | Issues $11.25 billion in bonds to fund affordable housing programs, including Multifamily Housing Program, CalVet Home Loan Program, and youth housing. | | | | | Bond issue |
| Proposition 2 | Increases the annual cap of the Budget Stabilization Account (BSA; the state's rainy day fund), from 10% of general fund revenue to 20% and excluding deposits into the BSA from the Gann Limit (the state's spending limit). | | | | | Legislatively referred constitutional amendment |
| Proposition 3 | Makes permanent the top marginal income tax rates first enacted via Proposition 30 in 2012 and modified via Proposition 55 in 2016. Under the 2024 levels (adjusted annually for inflation), the rates would apply to single filers earning at least $361,000, and joint filers earning at least $721,000. 89% of the revenue generated would fund K-12 schools, and 11% on community colleges. Although local school boards would decide how these revenues are specifically spent, they cannot use them for any administrative costs. | | | | | Citizen-initiated constitutional amendment |
| Proposition 4 | Repeals the 1988 ban on public financing of campaigns and allow for state and local governments to create programs that provide candidates with public funds under spending limits and eligibility rules. | | | | | Legislatively referred state statute |
| Proposition 5 | Eliminates the election of a successor when a state officer is recalled, thereby leaving the office vacant until it is filled according to state law; allowing for the recalled officer to run again for the same office at the special election, if one is held; and authorize the lieutenant governor to fill the gubernatorial vacancy until the expired term, unless the vacancy occurred before the close of the nomination period for the next statewide election during the first two years of the governor’s term, in which a special election would be called and which the winner would serve the remainder of the term. | | | | | Legislatively referred constitutional amendment |
| Proposition 37 | Establishes a second mortgage homebuyer program for qualified homebuyers on qualifying homes administered by the California Housing Finance Agency (CalHFA), and authorize the CalHFA to issue up to $25 billion in bonds to fund the program. The second mortgages would cover up to 17% of the home's price for those making a down payment of at least 3%. | | | | | Citizen-initiated state statute |
| Proposition 38 | Issues $8.4 billion in bonds to fund immunology and immunotherapy research; establish an Immunology and Immunotherapy Research Institute affiliated with the University of California; and award grants to California-based public and nonprofit medical research institutions for immunology and immunotherapy research. | | | | | Citizen-initiated bond issue |
| Proposition 39 | Mandates voter identification requirements. Specifically, voters would have to either present a government-issued ID when voting in-person or the last four digits of a government-issued ID number when voting by mail. The state would also need to provide free voter ID cards upon request to those who do not already have a government-issued ID. County election officials would further be required to "maintain accurate voter registration lists [and]... use best efforts to verify citizenship attestations using government data", and to report each year the percentage of each county's voter rolls that have been citizenship-verified. The State Auditor would also have to audit government compliance with these requirements during odd-numbered years and report "findings and recommendations for improving the integrity of elections to the public." | | | | | Citizen-initiated constitutional amendment |
| Proposition 40 | Require the state's billionaires would pay a one-time 5% wealth tax, including businesses, securities, shares of capital stock and bonds, art, collectibles, and intellectual property. Real property and some pensions and retirement accounts would be exempt. 90% of the revenue generated would fund Medi-Cal and other health care programs, and 10% on food assistance or education-related programs. It also mandates that the revenue would supplement, not replace, the existing funding for these programs. | | | | | Citizen-initiated constitutional amendment |
| Proposition 41 | Require pre-election audits for ballot initiatives proposing special taxes once they report collecting 25% of signatures to be included in the voter information pamphlet if it qualifies for the ballot. State laws or ballot initiatives levying a new special tax enacted after January 1, 2026, will also need to undergo state audits every four years to determine program effectiveness and cost-saving measures. In additon, the state would be prohibited from forcing any tax that is exempted or excluded from the state spending limit enacted or effective on or after January 1, 2026. | | | | | Citizen-initiated constitutional amendment |
| Proposition 42 | Prohibits the enactment of new taxes after January 1, 2026, on ownership or control of retirement holdings, individually-owned assets, and other forms of personal savings, and retroactive taxes that result in a tax liability based on conduct, activities, or a status that occurred or were present prior to the effective date of the tax. | | | | | Citizen-initiated constitutional amendment |
| Proposition 43 | Expands the two-thirds voter approval requirement for special taxes under 1978's Proposition 13 to specifically include special taxes placed on the ballot under the initiative power, following a court ruling that the two-thirds requirement for special taxes applied only to measures placed on the ballot by a local government. | | | | | Citizen-initiated constitutional amendment |
| Proposition 44 | Requires nonprofit Federally Qualified Health Centers (FQHCs) and FQHC Look-Alikes to spend at least 90 percent of their annual total revenue on expenses advancing their respective health center's mission. | | | | | Citizen-initiated state statute |
| Proposition 45 | Amends the California Environmental Quality Act to allow an expedite environmental review process for certain essential projects, including most of those for housing, transportation, water, health, and clean energy. Specifically, the measure would establish deadlines for public agencies for them to complete the environmental review and take the required actions, limit public agencies' existing requirements to consider alternatives to reduce the environmental impacts, and limit the court review process for project approvals by setting deadlines for filing and resolving lawsuits and limiting the evidence and relief the court can consider. | | | | | Citizen-initiated state statute |

=== Removed from the November ballot ===
Qualified ballot measures can be removed from the ballot if their supporters decide to withdraw them. In 2026, multiple qualified propositions were withdrawn by their sponsors.

==== California Vote Requirements for Initiatives Requiring Supermajority Votes Amendment ====
The California Vote Requirements for Initiatives Requiring Supermajority Votes Amendment, also known as ACA 13, was a legislatively referred constitutional amendment that was set appear on the November 3, 2026 ballot in California. The amendment required initiated constitutional amendments that propose increased voter approval requirements for state or local measures to first be approved by the same majority requirement they are proposing. (Note: For example, a citizen initiated constitutional amendment proposing a 66.67% vote threshold for future ballot measures would first need to be approved by 66.67% of California voters)

On June 25, 2026, the amendment was removed from the ballot after both chambers of California State Legislature voted unanimously to withdraw it from consideration.

== Concerns over ICE at polling places ==
California was one of nine states where Homeland Security Investigations planned to send agents to people's homes, starting September 2026, to ask about their citizenship and whether they had registered or voted.

A federal judge in California issued a preliminary injunction on October 21 that stops these visits in California when the person is likely a U.S. citizen. She found that the visits probably violated the Voting Rights Act's ban on intimidating people who help others vote. The order runs through Election Day and was paused until October 23 so the government can appeal.
