= Sal Rosselli =

American labor leader

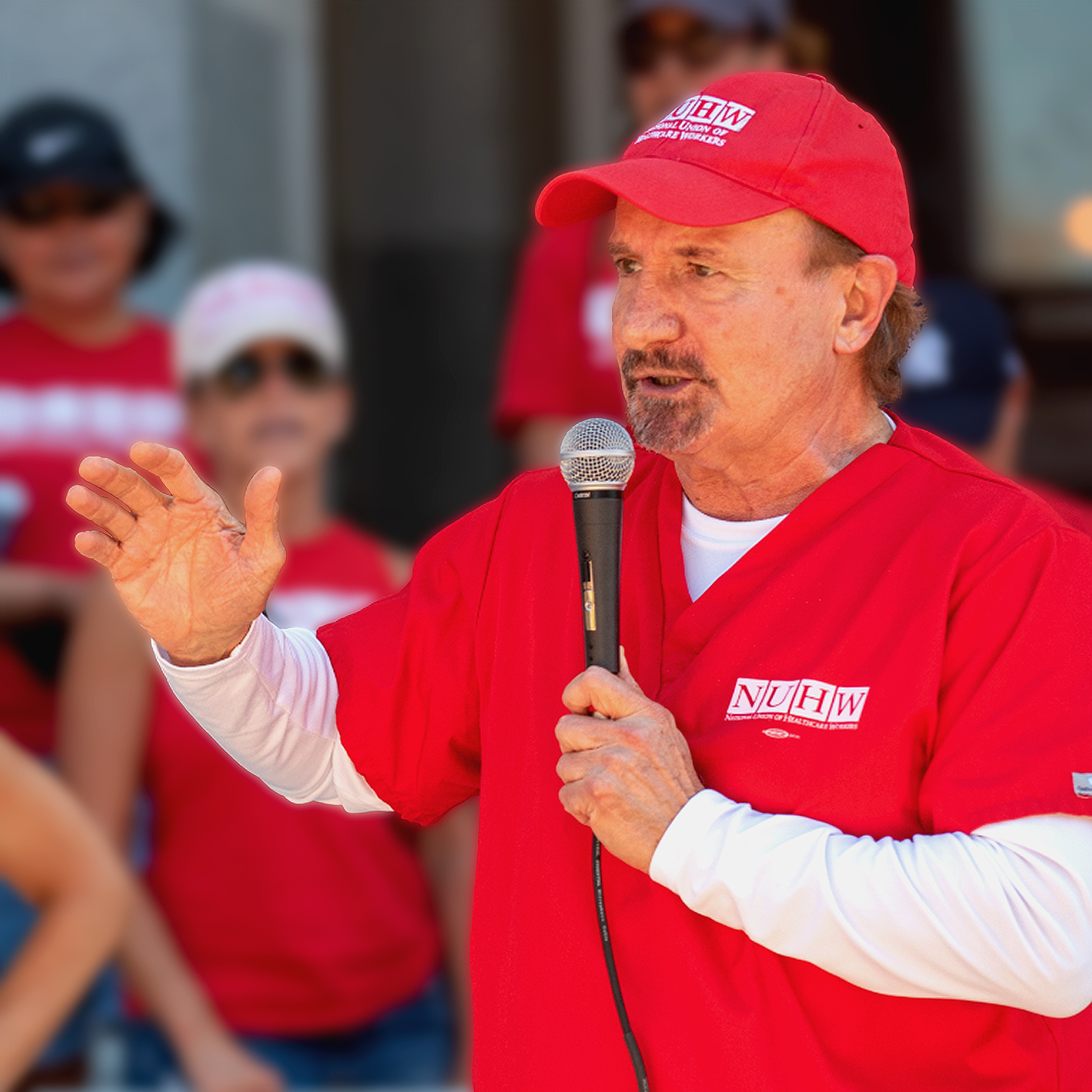
Sal Rosselli

Sal Rosselli (born 1949, New York City) is president emeritus of the National Union of Healthcare Workers (NUHW).

Rosselli has been active in the labor movement since the late 1970s as a union member, an organizer, and an elected leader. In 1987 as a staff director for California's SEIU Local 250, which later became SEIU United Healthcare Workers West, Rosselli was fired by SEIU's then-President John Sweeney for protesting the International's anti-democratic practices. The SEIU then put Local 250 into trusteeship, which led to a rank-and-file movement to organize The New Leadership Team slate to run for the union's officers and executive board. With the support and guidance of the Association for Union Democracy, the slate won the majority of board seats, with Rosselli winning the presidency.

Rosselli and his team went on to build the 25,000-member local to more than 150,000 members. During the height of the AIDS crisis, Local 250 created the first literature educating workers about the virus, and became a national leader in defining the mission of healthcare workers to ensure that everyone receives compassionate care. Under Rosselli's leadership, the union also played a pivotal role in passing Healthy San Francisco, a program that provides affordable health care for all city residents.

In 2007, as the Service Employees International Union again attempted to take control of the local's affairs in opposition to the wishes of its members, Rosselli and other leaders stood up for members and advocated for transparency, local member control and democracy within the union. A 2009 attempt to put the local in trusteeship, prompted by disagreements between the local and international leaders, prompted the local executive board to vote to form NUHW.

In addition to winning industry-standard contracts for its members, NUHW is a leader in the struggle to improve access to mental health care. Its members have waged a campaign including multiple strikes to force Kaiser Permanente, the nation's largest nonprofit HMO, to meet its legal and ethical obligations under the state and federal mental health parity laws. NUHW is also a leader in the effort to make California the first state to adopt a single-payer, Medicare-for-All healthcare system through its leadership in the Healthy California Now coalition. In 2017, at the beginning of the Trump presidency, NUHW declared itself a Sanctuary Union and made a commitment to defend members who might face deportation, including helping to provide legal representation.

In 2024, Rosselli opted not to run for a sixth term as NUHW's president and is now president emeritus, leading the union's political and legislative efforts and helping to lead the union's major contract campaigns. Rosselli is a member of the board of directors of Healthy California Now, the state's largest coalition of single-payer healthcare advocates, and Courage California, an online advocacy organization for which he currently serves as secretary-treasurer. He is also a member of San Francisco's Harvey Milk LGBTQ Democratic Club, as well as a member and former president of the Alice B. Toklas LGBTQ Democratic Club. He previously served as a volunteer with Dorothy Day's Catholic Worker and Volunteers in Service to America, and on the board of Jesse Jackson's Rainbow PUSH Coalition.
