= California Proposition 17 =

California Proposition 17 may refer to the following ballot measures:

- 1972 California Proposition 17, passed by California voters to reintroduce the death penalty in the state.
- 2010 California Proposition 17, rejected by California voters that would have allowed auto insurance companies to charge based on continuity of insurance coverage.
- 2020 California Proposition 17, passed by California voters to allow people who are on parole to vote in the state.

== See also ==
- California ballot proposition, a referendum or initiative submitted to the California electorate for a vote
- List of California ballot propositions
