= Proposition 19 =

Proposition 19 may refer to a California ballot initiative:

- 2020 California Proposition 19, a successful property tax change
- 2010 California Proposition 19, a failed attempt at marijuana legalization
- 1972 California Proposition 19, a failed attempt at marijuana legalization
