= Proposition 17 =

Proposition 17 refers to two different and unrelated California ballot propositions.

- 1972 California Proposition 17 related to Capital punishment
- 2020 California Proposition 17 relates to expansion of voting rights to individuals on parole
