= 2020 California Proposition 18 =

2020 California ballot proposition

Proposition 18
- November 3, 2020
- Allows 17-year-olds who will be 18 at the time of the next general election to vote in primaries and special elections

Results
Choice	Votes	%
Yes	7,514,317	43.96%
No	9,577,807	56.04%
Valid votes	17,092,124	96.10%
Invalid or blank votes	693,027	3.90%
Total votes	17,785,151	100.00%
Registered voters/turnout	22,047,448	80.67%
County results
For
60%–70%
50%–60%
Against
80%–90%
70%–80%
60%–70%
50%–60%

The 2020 California Proposition 18 would allow 17-year-olds to vote in primary and special elections if they will turn 18 by the subsequent general election.

Appearing on the ballot in the 2020 California elections on November 3, 2020, the proposed state constitutional amendment was originally introduced as California Assembly Constitutional Amendment No. 4 (ACA 4) by Assemblymember Kevin Mullin. ACA 4 passed the California State Assembly on August 22, 2019, amended and passed by the California State Senate on June 25, 2020, and was re-approved by the California State Assembly on June 26, 2020. After being put on the ballot, ACA 4 was given the ballot designation of Prop 18. Because it is a proposed constitutional amendment, 2020 Proposition 18 must appear as a ballot proposition and be approved by voters.

Proposition 18 is one of two proposed ballot measures in the 2020 California elections that would expand voting rights. The other is Proposition 17, which would allow individuals on parole to vote. Even though Proposition 17 passed, Proposition 18 failed, by a margin of roughly twelve percentage points.

== Background ==
In the last 20 years, California has held primary elections in February (2008), March (2000, 2002, 2004, 2020), and June (2006, 2008, 2010, 2012, 2014, 2016). Currently, 18 other states and the District of Columbia allow people who are 17 to vote in a primary if they will be 18 by the general election in November. Both of these are proposed amendments to the California Constitution that originated in the California State Assembly.

== Campaign ==
=== Support ===
The official Argument in Favor of ACA 4 was submitted by Assemblymember Kevin Mullin and Assemblymember Evan Low.

Yes

Statewide officials

- Gavin Newsom, governor of California (2019–present) (Democratic)
- Alex Padilla, California Secretary of State (2015–2021) (Democratic)

State legislators

- Kevin Mullin, speaker pro tempore of the California State Assembly (2014–2022) from the 22nd district (2012–2022) (Democratic)
- Evan Low, state assemblymember from the 28th district (2014–2022) (Democratic)

Labor unions

- California Federation of Teachers
- SEIU United Healthcare Workers West

Political parties

- California Democratic Party
- California Green Party
- Peace and Freedom Party

Organizations

- Equality California
- League of Women Voters California
- ACLU of Northern California
- ACLU of Southern California
- San Francisco League of Pissed Off Voters
- National Nurses United

Newspapers

- The Bakersfield Californian
- East Los Angeles College Campus Times
- Los Angeles Times
- Mountain View Voice
- Palo Alto Weekly
- San Diego Jewish World
- The San Diego Union-Tribune
- San Francisco Chronicle
- Santa Barbara Independent

=== Opposition ===
The official Argument Against ACA 4 was submitted by Ruth Weiss, Co-Founder of the Election Integrity Project California, Jon Coupal, President of the Howard Jarvis Taxpayers Association, and Larry Sand, a retired teacher.

No

Political parties

- California Republican Party

Organizations

- Howard Jarvis Taxpayers Association

Newspapers

- The Mercury News
- The Orange County Register
- The Press-Telegram
- Santa Cruz Sentinel
- The Desert Sun
- Palo Alto Daily Post
- Santa Barbara News-Press

== Polling ==
Poll source	Date(s) administered	Sample size (Note: Key: A – all adults RV – registered voters LV – likely voters V – unclear)	Margin of error	For	Against	Undecided
Probolsky Research	October 12–15, 2020	900 (LV)	± 3.3%	45%	52%	3%

== Results ==
Choice	Votes	%
For	7,514,317	43.96%
Against	9,577,807	56.04%
Blank votes	693,027	–
Total	17,785,151	100.00%
Registered voters/turnout	22,047,448	80.67
Source: elections.cdn.sos.ca.gov
