= SEIU United Healthcare Workers West =

Statewide local union of the Service Employees International Union in California

SEIU UHW
- SEIU United Healthcare Workers West

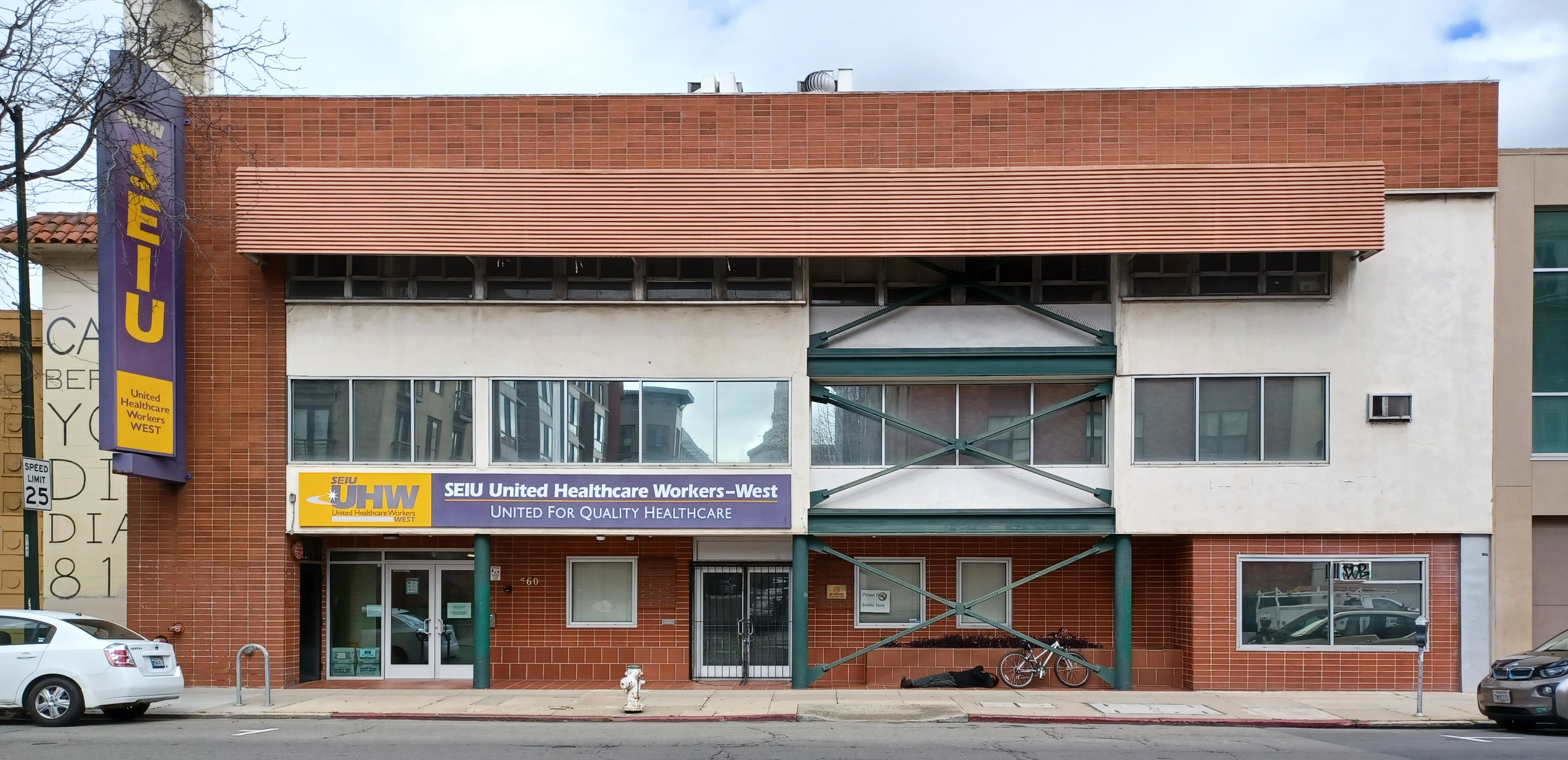
- Office in Oakland, California
- Founded: 2004
- Headquarters: Oakland, California
- Location: United States
- Members: 97,000 (2020)
- Key people: Dave Regan, President; Stan Lyles, Vice-President
- Parent organization: Service Employees International Union
- Website: www.seiu-uhw.org

The SEIU United Healthcare Workers West (SEIU-UHW) is a statewide local union of the Service Employees International Union in California in the United States. In 2020, it had 97,000 members, down from nearly 150,000 in 2013.

UHW is headquartered in Oakland, California and has offices statewide. UHW is an industrial union representing all classifications of health care workers in hospitals, nursing homes, clinics, home health agencies as well as homecare workers.

== Ballot propositions ==
Year	Statewide/Local	Proposition	Official name	Qualified for the ballot	Voted on or Withdrawn	Amount spent
2018	Statewide	2018 California Proposition 8	Limits on Dialysis Clinics' Revenue and Required Refunds Initiative	On ballot	Rejected 60% to 40%	$19.3 million
2020	Statewide	2020 California Proposition 23	Protect the Lives of Dialysis Patients Act Initiative	On ballot	Rejected 63% to 37%	$8.9 million
2022	Statewide	2022 California Proposition 29	Dialysis Clinic Requirements Initiative	On ballot	Rejected 68% to 32%	$8 million
2026	Statewide	2026 California Proposition 40	One-Time Wealth Tax for State-Funded Health Care Programs Initiative	On ballot		$29 million up to September 19, 2026
2026	Statewide	2026 California Proposition 44	Spending Requirements for Federally Qualified Health Centers Initiative	On ballot		$16.9 million up to September 19, 2026

SEIU-UHW has filed dozens of ballot initiatives since 2012, generally proposing increased regulations on healthcare companies; few if any have passed. In the 2018, 2020, and 2022 elections, three successive propositions from SEIU-UHW related to kidney dialysis clinics appeared on the California statewide ballot (2018 California Proposition 8, 2020 California Proposition 23, and 2022 California Proposition 29). The 2020 measure would have required a physician on-site during all dialysis treatments, among other requirements; the 2022 measure loosened this and would require a physician, physician assistant, or nurse practitioner. Otherwise, they are "nearly identical". The 2018 measure would have capped profits of dialysis clinics.

There are no unionized employees of dialysis clinics in California, meaning the campaigns have not been undertaken for the benefit of the union's current members. Most commentators other than SEIU-UHW itself, including Democrats, progressive groups, hospital groups, and other labor unions, believe that these ballot propositions are a negotiation tactic in SEIU-UHW's effort to cause dialysis clinics to unionize, by leveraging the threat of continued costly ballot fights (or regulation) if they do not—rather than an earnest attempt to improve patient safety. Some have called the tactic inappropriate and an "abuse of the initiative process." SEIU has used ballot initiatives for this purpose repeatedly since 2012. The Sacramento Bee called SEIU-UHW "one of California’s fiercest political players" for its funding of the initiatives since 2018.

In October 2025, SEIU-UHW filed a ballot initiative for 2026 California Proposition 40, which would levy a 5% wealth tax on billionaires in California.

By September 19 2026, SEIU-UHW had spent $16.9 million funding 2026 California Proposition 44, a statewide ballot proposition designed to "Require community health clinics [to] spend 90% of revenue on program services."

In September 2026, several healthcare clinics, along with the California Primary Care Association, filed a lawsuit in federal court accusing the union and its current president, Dave Regan, of racketeering and extortion. The plaintiffs claim that since 2011 the union has been creating and qualifing ballot initiatives designed to punish hospitals and healthcare providers it wants to unionize, and then offering to withdraw the initiatives if the hospitals and providers agree to concessions, like allowing for unionization of their workforces by skipping the normal unionization process. The Los Angeles times states that "The suit also alleges that Regan and UHW are in violation of a California law that prohibits a proponent of a ballot initiative from seeking, soliciting, bargaining for, or obtaining any money or a thing of value from any person or entity for abandoning or preventing an initiative from moving forward."

== History ==
UHW was created by the merger of two SEIU local unions: Local 250 in Northern California and Local 399 in Southern California. The larger of those two locals, Local 250, began when workers at San Francisco General Hospital, who were inspired by the 1934 general strike in San Francisco, organized a union at their hospital in 1934 as the Hospital and Institutional Workers Union #19818, later affiliating with the Building Service Employees International Union, becoming BSEIU Local 250. After affiliation, they won a groundbreaking first contract with the San Francisco Hospital Conference, covering 11 hospitals. BSEIU Local 399 emerged in 1949, when several Southern California local unions consolidated under the leadership of BSEIU's Charles "Pop" Hardy who wanted to merge smaller unions to increase the unions' strength. It then successfully negotiated a contract with the first Kaiser Permanente hospital, in Los Angeles, the following year.

In 1958, both BSEIU Local 250 and Local 399 joined together in leading the BSEIU effort to defeat Prop. 18, a right-to-work initiative. After BSEIU changed its name to SEIU in 1968, the two locals partnered again in 1974 to successfully lobby Congress to change federal law, allowing non-profit hospitals to organize. The two merged to form SEIU-United Healthcare Workers West (SEIU Local 2005) in 2004.

On January 27, 2009, SEIU placed UHW West under trusteeship and dismissed 70 of the local's executives, including president Sal Rosselli. Rosselli and other ousted leaders reformed under the National Union of Healthcare Workers and pushed for UHW West members at 60 facilities to vote to decertify SEIU. In the series of elections that have taken place so far to determine whether or not current SEIU-UHW members want to stay in their union or join rival NUHW, more than 73,000 have chosen to stay in the local.

On June 23, 2010 SEIU-UHW members at Kaiser Permanente ratified a contract covering 46,000 California workers guaranteeing a 3% annual wage increases. Other victories of the union include winning a six-week strike against Sutter Health in San Francisco; the conclusion of successful negotiations with Catholic Healthcare West; organizing victories at O'Connor Woods Retirement Community in Stockton, California (later decertified two years later which was a stunning defeat for SEIU-UHW), St. Vincent Medical Center in Los Angeles, Parkview Community Hospital in Riverside, California, and of IT workers at Kaiser; and a statewide contract victory with HCA, the nation's largest hospital company. Most of the union's current organizing work is being carried out in Southern California.

On March 26, 2020, amid concerns about a shortage of protective equipment for healthcare workers during the coronavirus pandemic, SEIU-UHW announced it had secured a stockpile of 39 million N95 masks, for purchase by various hospital systems and government agencies. (The union later clarified that it had no financial interest in arranging these transactions.) Hospitals that did not place orders became the target of SEIU petitions accusing them of "putting bottom line profits over [healthcare workers' and patients'] safety." On April 11, it was revealed that SEIU-UHW and other middlemen had been the victims of a scam and that the stockpile did not exist. The scheme was uncovered by FBI agents during attempts to seize the shipment for FEMA under the Defense Production Act.

=== Allegations of extortion and abuse by president Dave Regan ===
In February 2026, SEIU United Service Workers West (SEIU-USWW) president David Huerta and three other labor leaders filed a formal complaint against SEIU-UHW president Dave Regan, accusing him of extorting them by suggesting that he would "report unspecified governance concerns to the U.S. Department of Labor ... if [they] did not support the billionaire tax". An investigation initiated by the SEIU's national branch substantiated these claims as well as allegations from SEIU California executive director Tia Orr that Regan had threatened her by telling her to "endorse this measure ... or I'm coming for you".

A September 2026 report from SEIU California found that Regan had "engaged in a pattern of subjecting former and current SEIU California female directors to intimidating and threatening physical behavior" and substantiated former union leader Courtni Pugh's allegations that Regan physically assaulted her. Regan denied this and claimed that because Pugh worked as a political consultant against the tax, she had a reason to lie. A separate investigation found that Regan had intimidated and bullied SEIU California's government relations director, Jessica Bartholow, by standing "uncomfortably close" to her as "tensions flared over the billionaire tax" before "scream[ing] an expletive at her".

Regan dismissed the allegations as political retaliation over his support for the billionaire tax; an independent investigation found that his claims were unsubstantiated. On September 11, 2026, the California Nurses Association, who support Proposition 40, published a statement urging Regan to resign over "inappropriate, aggressive behavior and threats targeting other labor staff to support the Prop. 40 billionaire tax initiative."

Membership (US records)
View chart definition.
Finances (US records; ×$1000)
View chart definition.

== See also ==
- National Union of Healthcare Workers
