= 2020 California Proposition 15 =

Initiative to provide education funding

Proposition 15
- Schools and Communities First Initiative

Results
Choice	Votes	%
Yes	8,213,054	48.03%
No	8,885,569	51.97%
Valid votes	17,098,623	96.14%
Invalid or blank votes	686,528	3.86%
Total votes	17,785,151	100.00%
Registered voters/turnout	22,047,448	80.67%
County results
For
70%–80%
60%–70%
50%–60%
Against
70%–80%
60%–70%
50%–60%

California Proposition 15 was a failed citizen-initiated proposition on the November 3, 2020, ballot. It would have provided $6.5 billion to $11.5 billion in new funding for public schools, community colleges, and local government services by creating a "split roll" system that increased taxes on large commercial properties by assessing them at market value, without changing property taxes for small business owners or residential properties for homeowners or renters. The measure failed by a small margin of about four percentage points.

Proposition 15 would have amended the Constitution of California to adjust the limitations on property taxes introduced by 1978 California Proposition 13. It would have changed the property tax assessment on owners of commercial properties with a combined value of greater than $3 million to pay property tax based on the property's current market value, not purchase price. The measure would have exempted all agricultural land and small businesses that owned their own properties. It also included a small business tax cut by increasing the small business personal property tax deduction. All residential properties for homeowners and renters were exempt and other special circumstantial exemptions were provided under the proposition, such as an exemption for rental units or properties with a higher value in which the owner does not in the property (in this case, the tax would have been based on the market value of the property starting in 2022).

According to the official ballot summary, Proposition 15:

- Would have raised $8 billion to $12.5 billion in new funding—$6.5 billion to $11.5 billion after the costs of implementation—in new funding.
- First, funding would have gone to the state to supplement for the decreasing tax revenue.
- Only 60% of the remaining funding will go to local government services such as public health, safety and fire prevention and only 40% of the remaining funding will go to K–12 public schools and community colleges.
- Would have required commercial properties worth $3 million or more to be taxed at fair market value—not purchase price
- Would have exempted small businesses, agricultural lands and residential properties for homeowners and renters
- Would have cut taxes for small businesses by reducing personal property taxes

According to the official voter information guide:

- "A YES vote on this measure means: Property taxes on most commercial properties worth more than $3 million would go up in order to provide new funding to local governments and schools."
- "A NO vote on this measure means: Proposition 13 still stands—property taxes on commercial properties would stay the same. Local governments and schools would not get new funding."

It was one of two ballot measures on the 2020 California ballot that would adjust the original Proposition 13, the other being Proposition 19.

== Background ==
In 1978, the California voters passed Proposition 13, which limited property taxes to 1% of assessed value, limited increases in assessed value to at most 2% per year, and set assessed value at the 1975–76 value. The assessed value only changes when the property is sold, when there is new construction on the property, or when a change of ownership otherwise occurs. This led to a 60% decrease in property tax revenue collected by local governments the year after Proposition 13 was passed, and forced local authorities in California to subsequently rely on sales taxes, which are more regressive, as well as on state government funding originating from California's personal income tax, which is more progressive but also more volatile.

If Proposition 15 passed, it would have required owners of large commercial, non-residential properties of a combined value of over $3 million to pay property taxes based on current market value, not purchase price. Owners of commercial parcels with a combined value of under $3 million and owners of agricultural or residential property would still be covered by Proposition 13. This type of "split roll" property tax system would have resulted in most owners of large commercial properties paying higher property taxes commensurate with the property's current market value, without changing property taxes for small businesses, agricultural lands, or residential properties. Upon this proposition passing, there would have been a reduction in taxes on business equipment. The amount of funding allocated to the local government and schools is dependent on the Local Control Funding Formula.

=== Property transfer loophole ===
Some businesses have exploited a property transfer loophole in Proposition 13 implementing statutes created by the California Legislature that define what constitutes a change in property ownership. To take advantage of this loophole, businesses only have to make sure that no change in ownership exceeds 50% in order to avoid a property tax reassessment.

One of the world's largest investment firms The Blackstone Group, for example, avoided paying $2.7 million in property taxes when they purchased 49% ownership of a San Francisco property in 2017. The Trump Organization, owned by Donald Trump, is another notable property owner who has avoided millions of dollars in California property taxes as a result of the loophole. In 2018, the California Board of Equalization estimated that closing this loophole would raise up to $269 million annually in new tax revenue.

The Legislature could close the property transfer loophole with a 2/3 vote. The loophole was almost closed in 2014 by a bipartisan coalition in the state legislature but the effort died after progressive politicians, organized labor, and community groups refused to support the effort. In 2015 and 2018, Republican efforts to fix this loophole were stalled by Democratic state legislators in legislative committee. Another Republican attempt to close the loophole was made in 2020. Democrat Don Perata, former California senate leader, said this loophole is left open by his party to create justification for ending Proposition 13.

== Support ==
=== Political endorsements ===
This measure was supported by over 650 federal, state, and local elected officials and the California Democratic Party. Notable endorsements include:

- Newspapers: Los Angeles Times, The New York Times, The Sacramento Bee, San Francisco Chronicle
- Candidates for president and vice president: Former Vice President Joe Biden and U.S. Senator Kamala Harris
- U.S. senators: Bernie Sanders, Elizabeth Warren, and Cory Booker
- U.S. representatives: Barbara Lee, Ro Khanna, Karen Bass
- Statewide elected officials including Governor Gavin Newsom, Secretary of State Alex Padilla, State Insurance Commissioner Ricardo Lara, State Controller Betty Yee, and Superintendent of Public Instruction Tony Thurmond
- 8 CA State senators including President Pro Tem Toni Atkins, Nancy Skinner, Scott Wiener, and Bob Wieckowski
- 21 CA State assembly members including Speaker pro Tempore Anthony Rendon
- 66 mayors including Los Angeles Mayor Eric Garcetti, San Francisco Mayor London Breed, Oakland Mayor Libby Schaaf and Sacramento Mayor Darrell Steinberg
- 9 counties including Alameda, Los Angeles, Santa Clara, and San Francisco
- 340 school board members and 182 city council members

=== Organizational endorsements ===
The measure was also supported by a broad coalition of over 900 education, health and public service employees, and advocacy groups. Notable endorsing organizations included:

- Education advocates: California State PTA, California Federation of Teachers, California Teachers Association
- Health and public safety unions: California Nurses Association, Service Employees International Union (SEIU), American Federation of State, County and Municipal Employees, California State Firefighters Association
- Civic organizations: League of Women Voters of California, ACLU of Northern and Southern California, Planned Parenthood Affiliates of California, Dolores Huerta Foundation
- Environment groups: Sierra Club California, California League of Conservation Voters, Natural Resources Defense Council
- Agriculture: Community Alliance with Family Farmers, California Climate and Agriculture Network
- Business: Consumer Federation of California, Silicon Valley Minority Business Consortium, Kern County Black Chamber of Commerce, Sierra Business Council
- Housing: California Housing Partnership, California Coalition for Rural Housing, Housing California, Non-Profit Housing Association of Northern California, Southern California Association of Nonprofit Housing
- Senior advocates: California Alliance for Retired Americans, California Retired Teachers Association, Senior and Disability Action
- Philanthropy organizations: California Community Foundation, Chan Zuckerberg Initiative, United Ways of California
- Racial and social justice groups: California Calls, PICO California, Courage California

This initiative attracted 1.7 million signatures as part of the ballot initiative campaign, a number which organizers describe as 'record-breaking'.

=== Donations ===
The Yes on Proposition 15 campaign raised over $67.6 million mostly from foundations and public service unions. The top 3 contributors were the Chan Zuckerberg Initiative, California Teachers Association, and SEIU California.

=== Supporter arguments ===
Supporters said Prop 15 is a broad coalition of 1600 organizations launched by civil rights organizations, housing groups, parents, teachers, nurses, firefighters and community-based organizations who advocate for equality and justice for communities of color.

Supporters stated that 92% of the revenue generated from Prop. 15 would be paid by 10% of the highest value commercial properties based on a study using the assessor's property tax data. Almost half of the revenue generated would be paid by properties that have not been reassessed since before 2000.

Supporters cited a report that Proposition 15 will not impact small businesses, including those who rent and are in triple net leases. The report was published by Beacon Economics and commissioned by the Silicon Valley Community Foundation. The study said that rents are determined by the local market, not by the property taxes paid.

U.S. President-elect Joe Biden said: "Every kid deserves a quality education, and every family deserves to live in a safe, healthy community. That's why I support Prop 15." while previous U.S. Senator from California and Vice President–elect Kamala Harris, also a supporter, stated: "A corporate tax loophole has allowed billions to be drained from our public schools and local communities. No more. I'm proud to support Prop 15."

Proponents of the split roll property tax system said the intent of Proposition 13 was to protect residential property taxes from spiking and say the broad application of Proposition 13 to corporate property is a loophole.

Governor Gavin Newsom announced his endorsement of Proposition 15, calling the proposal "a fair, phased-in and long-overdue reform to state tax policy." The governor said in a written statement, "It's consistent with California's progressive fiscal values, it will exempt small businesses and residential property owners, it will fund essential services such as public schools and public safety and, most importantly, it will be decided by a vote of the people."

Many argued that the additional public revenue provided by this initiative is badly needed. After Proposition 13 was passed in 1978, San Jose had to cut public services and resulted in the first public school in America in 40 years to declare bankruptcy. These issues with educational inequality have only worsened in light of the effects of the COVID-19 pandemic in the United States. San Francisco mayor London Breed referred to this in her statement of support, saying "When I look at our dire budget deficits over the next couple of years, and then I see these revenue estimates showing how much we can invest in our community without having to raise any taxes on residents, it makes it more important for me to give my full support on this initiative."

Labor leader Dolores Huerta also argued that this revenue will help fund public health services such as clinics and public hospitals, which are facing the additional burden of the pandemic.

Socialists supporting Proposition 15 stated: "Prop 15 is a progressive tax, drawing its revenue from those best able to pay on behalf of the common good."

Environmentalists also argues that the tax reform would constrain urban sprawl, which increases greenhouse gas emissions and exacerbates climate change by inducing vehicle travel demand.

California State PTA President Celia Jaffe stated: "Our schools have been desperately underfunded for years, and we need this measure to ensure our children have the resources they need in order to learn. We urge parents and families across the state to support this act to give classrooms – and our children – the funding they need."

== Opposition ==
=== Political opponents ===
The measure was opposed by over 190 current and former federal, state, and local elected officials, and the California Republican Party. Notable opponents include:

- U.S. representatives: Former U.S. Congressman Tom Campbell
- Statewide elected officials: Former Governor of California Pete Wilson
- 7 CA State senators including Republican Leader Shannon Grove, Scott Wilk, and Bob Archuleta
- 8 CA State Assembly members including Adam Gray, Devon Mathis, and Jay Obernolte; Former S.F Mayor and Speaker of the Assembly Willie Brown
- 34 mayors including Orange Mayor Mark Murphy, Palos Verdes Mayor John Cruikshank, and Santa Clarita Mayor Cameron Smyth
- 5 school board officials and 53 city council members

=== Organizational opponents ===
This measure is also opposed by a coalition of over 350 business groups, taxpayer and civic organizations, land developers, and agricultural interests. Notable opposing organizations include:

- Business: California Business Properties Association, California Business Roundtable, and California Small Business Association
- Taxpayers: Howard Jarvis Taxpayers Association, National Tax Limitation Committee, and California Taxpayers Association
- Real estate: California Retailers Association, National Association of Industrial and Office, and Building Owners and Managers–California
- Civic: California State Conference of the NAACP, Latino Community Development Association, and National Veterans Foundation
- Construction: California Builders Alliance, California State Council of Laborers, and California Building Industry Association
- Agriculture: California Farm Bureau Federation, Western Growers Association, and California Cattlemen's Association
- Energy: California Fuels & Convenience Alliance, California Independent Petroleum Association, and Western Propane Gas Association
- 104 local chapters of the Chamber of Commerce including the California Chamber of Commerce

=== Donations ===
The No on Proposition 15 campaign raised over $73.1 million mostly from land developers, agricultural interests and golf and country clubs. The largest donor was the California Business Roundtable Issues PAC, which contributed more than $38 million to the No on 15 campaign. The Business Roundtable's biggest donors were New York–based Blackstone Property Partners, which gave $7 million, and Michael Hayde, CEO of the Irvine real estate investment firm Western National Group, who gave $4.5 million.

=== Opposition arguments ===
Opponents said the costs of the tax increase would ultimately be borne by commercial property renters (business owners), and at a time already challenging for retail businesses to survive. Property taxes are paid by the tenant (as opposed to the landlord) under most retail leases. That is because retail leases are generally structured as triple-net leases, whereby a building's property taxes, insurance premiums, and maintenance expenses are passed through to the tenant, who is responsible to pay for its proportionate share of those costs in addition to base rent. Retailers, already struggling due to the pandemic, may be unable to meet the increased tax bill, putting their survivability at greater risk. It was also expected to affect tenants who enter into gross leases (whereby expenses are included in base rent), as the higher taxes may be offset with higher rent. This would have a negative impact on tenant finances, and tenants may ultimately pass the higher costs to consumers. Opponents and analysts say Proposition 15 will have the greatest adverse impact on minority- and family-owned businesses, hitting local and regional players the hardest.

County assessors were almost uniformly against Proposition 15, saying the measure would lead to an unmanageable workload which would result in expenditures exceeding revenues to the state for many years, while revenue would be less than expected due to costly litigation associated with assessment appeals by property owners. Assessors said running the transition alone would cost $470 million per year for up to 10 years, and that the costs and challenges of the transition and increased workload could exceed any additional tax revenues. They also were critical of the tax breaks offered in the initiative, purportedly to appease small businesses. The measure provided that businesses with 50 employees or fewer would be exempt from the property tax on "equipment and fixtures," which assessors said did not make sense and would be impossible to implement as they have no means to determine a business's workforce. According to the California Assessor's Association, Proposition 15 would require the hiring of up to 900 new assessors statewide at a total cost of $517 million to $639 million per year.

Opponents said that while the measure targets the large commercial beneficiaries of Proposition 13, it will ultimately burden property renters, consumers, and business owners alike. They also state it may inevitably lead to a full repeal of Proposition 13. "We're next on the menu," said the president of the Howard Jarvis Taxpayers Association, who also said: "California has the highest income tax rate in America, we have the highest sales tax in America, we have the highest gas tax in America." and that "Even with Proposition 13 protections, California has higher property taxes than two-thirds of the nation."

Opponents drew attention to the significant financial support Facebook CEO Mark Zuckerberg has given the measure through the Chan Zuckerberg Initiative (CZI). Newer Silicon Valley corporations like Facebook derive smaller benefits from Proposition 13 than traditional California businesses do. While Facebook has not come out in support of the measure, opponents at the California Business Roundtable say: "We see CZI as a tool of Mark Zuckerberg and Facebook. It's a tool in his toolbox." Officials at the Chan Zuckerberg Initiative say the two entities operate independently.

Prop. 15 was also opposed by the California NAACP State Conference, which said it will harm minority small business owners. The endorsement received criticism because the leader of the California NAACP, Alice Huffman, owns a political consulting firm which has received cumulatively over $1.2 million in payments by campaigns that she endorsed. Huffman said she only takes on political clients whose campaigns are aligned with the California NAACP's positions.

Some commentators noted how the initiative would not provide funding for affordable housing development and would further lower the incentive for governmental approval of needed residential development in favor of more-taxable commercial development (for its attendant sales, payroll, business, and/or property tax revenue).

Opponents of the split roll property tax system said voters deliberately sought to extend Proposition 13 protections to all commercial property by rejecting a split roll promoted by Jerry Brown in 1978, and that the transfer loophole was created by the legislature and was not a component of the original Proposition 13 voters approved in the same election that year.

Some people contended this would be a way for state and local governments to pay off their significant unfunded pension liabilities rather than reforming pensions (by capping large payouts and making employees contribute more) that they feel are overly generous and adopted not because of market necessity, but because of unions' political power and bad legislative choices.

The California Farm Bureau opposed the measure because it feared that improvements to farms could be taxed at higher rates.

Another oppositional argument came from the fact that Proposition 15 would have a varying effect on different regions of the state because of the decreased business equipment taxes. It is possible that the rural areas would actually lose money, which would decrease the amount of funding going to public schools, amongst other local needs, deepening inequities state-wide.

== Expenditure of tax proceeds ==
All local governments that receive funds from the property tax increases imposed by Proposition 15 would have been required to publicly disclose for each fiscal year the amount of property tax revenues received thereunder for that fiscal year and how those property tax revenues were spent. Spending decisions on Proposition 15 tax proceeds will be made by local elected officials as part of the annual budget process.

== Education funding allocation ==
Of the Proposition 15 revenue, 40% would have been allocated for K–12 public school districts (89%) and community colleges (11%). The additional education revenue would have been distributed to local school districts through the state Local Control Funding Formula (LCFF) that uses state taxes to supplement the local property tax revenue so that every school district in the state reaches a minimum funding level based on the following principles:

1. Funding schools more equitably based on student needs
2. Making more decisions at a local level — local control of spending
3. Measure achievement using multiple metrics and supporting schools to improve

Some wealthier school districts receive more funding through their local property taxes than the LCFF limit. These school districts keep all their local property taxes and only receive "basic aid" from state taxes. On average, basic-aid school districts have more than $4,000 per student (30.6% increase) than LCFF school districts. Proposition 15 guarantees that all school districts will receive at least $100 more per student regardless of their LCFF or basic aid status.

Revenue projections for each district were calculated based on 2019–2020 enrollments and have been identified by School Services of California (as published by EdSource).

== Polling ==
In order to pass, it needed a simple majority (>50%).

Poll source	Date(s) administered	Sample size (Note: Key: A – all adults RV – registered voters LV – likely voters V – unclear)	Margin of error	For Proposition 15	Against Proposition 15	Undecided
UC Berkeley Institute of Governmental Studies	October 16–21, 2020	5,352 (LV)	–	49%	42%	9%
Public Policy Institute of California	October 9–18, 2020	1,185 (LV)	± 4.3%	49%	45%	6%
Ipsos/Spectrum News	October 7–15, 2020	1,400 (A)	± 3%	55%	29%	16%
SurveyUSA	September 26–28, 2020	588 (LV)	± 5.4%	49%	21%	30%
UC Berkeley Institute of Governmental Studies	September 9–15, 2020	5,942 (LV)	± 2%	49%	34%	17%
Public Policy Institute of California	September 4–13, 2020	1,168 (LV)	± 4.3%	51%	40%	9%
Probolsky Research	August 27 – September 2, 2020	900 (V)	± 3.3%	41%	49%	10% (Note: Includes "Refused")
Public Policy Institute of California (Note: Did not specify exemptions for commercial properties of $3 million or less)	April 1–9, 2020	1,091 (LV)	± 3.7%	53%	47%	1%
Public Policy Institute of California	November 3–12, 2019	1,008 (LV)	± 4.3%	46%	45%	9%
Public Policy Institute of California	September 16–25, 2019	1,031 (LV)	± 4.2%	47%	45%	8%
Public Policy Institute of California	April 5–15, 2019	1,035 (LV)	± 4%	54%	45%	1%
Public Policy Institute of California	January 20–29, 2019	1,154 (LV)	± 4%	49%	43%	8%
Public Policy Institute of California	October 27 – November 5, 2018	1,095 (LV)	± 4.4%	56%	40%	4%
USC Dornsife/Los Angeles Times	September 17 – October 14, 2018	980 (RV)	± 4%	46%	22%	31%
Public Policy Institute of California	March 25 – April 3, 2018	867 (LV)	± 4.4%	53%	42%	5%

== Result ==
Proposition 15
Choice	Votes	%
For	8,213,054	48.03
Against	8,885,569	51.97
Total	17,098,623	100.00
Valid votes	17,098,623	96.14
Invalid/blank votes	686,528	3.86
Total votes	17,785,151	100.00
Registered voters/turnout	22,047,448	80.67
Source: Statement of Vote at the Wayback Machine (archived October 3, 2025)

Proposition 15 results (excluding invalid votes)
Yes; 8,213,054 (48%)	No; 8,885,569 (52%)
▲50%
