= 2020 California elections =

- November 3, 2020
- Registered: 22,047,448
- Turnout: 80.67% (▲16.13 pp)

Elections were held in California on November 3, 2020. Unlike previous election cycles, the primary elections were held on Super Tuesday, March 3, 2020.

In addition to the U.S. presidential race, California voters elected all of California's seats to the House of Representatives, all of the seats of the State Assembly, and all odd-numbered seats of the State Senate. Neither of the state's two U.S. Senate seats were up for election in 2020.

Pursuant to Proposition 14 passed in 2010, California uses a nonpartisan blanket primary for almost all races, with the presidential primary races being the notable exception. Under the nonpartisan blanket primary system, all the candidates for the same elected office, regardless of respective political party, run against each other at once during the primary. The candidates receiving the most and second-most votes in the primary election then become the contestants in the general election.

== President of the United States ==
California, a stronghold for the Democratic Party, has 55 electoral votes in the Electoral College. Joe Biden won with 63% of the popular vote. On December 14, 2020, California cast its electoral votes for Joe Biden.

United States presidential election in California
Party	Candidate	Votes	%	±%
Democratic	Joe Biden	11,110,250	63.48%	+1.75
Republican	Donald Trump (incumbent)	6,006,429	34.32%	+2.70
Libertarian	Jo Jorgensen	187,895	1.07%	−2.30
Green	Howie Hawkins	81,029	0.46%	−1.51
American Independent	Rocky De La Fuente	60,160	0.34%	N/A
Peace and Freedom	Charlie Bourbon	51,037	0.29%	−0.18
Write-in		4,081	0.02%	
Total votes		17,500,881	100.00%	
Democratic win				

== United States House of Representatives ==
There are 53 U.S. Representatives in California that were all up for election. The Democratic Party won 42 seats while the Republican Party won 11 seats. Three districts were gained by the Republican Party: the 21st, 39th, and 48th.

== State Senate ==
The 20 California State Senators in the odd-numbered districts were up for election. Out of the contested seats, Democrats won 17 and Republicans won 3. The resulting composition was 31 Democrats and 9 Republicans. Two districts were gained by the Democratic Party: the 29th and 37th.

== State Assembly ==
All 80 representatives in the California State Assembly were up for election. The resulting composition was 60 Democrats, 19 Republicans, and one independent. The Republican Party gained the 38th district.

== Propositions ==
Since the passage of a November 2011 law, only propositions placed on the ballot by the state legislature may appear on the primary ballot, and all qualifying measures placed via petition are automatically moved to the general election ballot.

=== Primary election ===
- Proposition 13: "Public Preschool, K-12, and College Health and Safety Bond Act of 2020" (Assembly Bill 48)

Prop 13 was a $15 billion bond measure to fund seismic retrofitting and other capital improvements on various California public preschool, K-12, and college campuses. Supporters argued that these improvements would make public schools safer and healthier. Opponents said that the actual total cost of the bonds plus interest would exceed $27 billion, more expensive than using funds directly from the regular state budget. It failed by a margin of 6 percentage points.

2020 California Proposition 13
Choice	Votes	%
For	4,304,013	46.99
Against	4,856,154	53.01
Total	9,160,167	100.00
Source: California Secretary of State

=== General election ===
Twelve state propositions were on the ballot.

2020 California propositions (November)
Name	Description	Votes				Type
Name	Description	Yes	%	No	%	Type
Proposition 14	Issues $5.5 billion in bonds for the state stem cell research institute.	8,588,156	51.12	8,211,692	48.88	Citizen-initiated state statute
Proposition 15	Increases government and education funding by requiring commercial and industrial properties to be taxed based on market value.	8,212,641	48.03	8,885,052	51.97	Citizen-initiated constitutional amendment
Proposition 16	Repeals Proposition 209 (1996) , which says that the state cannot discriminate or grant preferential treatment based on race, sex, color, ethnicity, or national origin in public employment, education, or contracting.	7,216,721	42.77	9,655,024	57.23	Legislatively referred constitutional amendment
Proposition 17	Establishes the right to vote for people convicted of felonies who are on parole.	9,985,065	58.55	7,068,706	41.45	Legislatively referred constitutional amendment
Proposition 18	Allows 17-year-olds who will be 18 at the time of the next general election to vote in primaries and special elections.	7,513,957	43.96	9,577,238	56.04	Legislatively referred constitutional amendment
Proposition 19	Allows homeowners over 55 years old or severely disabled to transfer their property tax base from their old home to their new one, regardless of the new residence's property value or location.	8,545,393	51.11	8,175,618	48.89	Legislatively referred constitutional amendment
Proposition 20	Makes changes to policies related to criminal sentencing charges, prison release, and DNA collection.	6,385,421	38.28	10,293,563	61.72	Citizen-initiated state statute
Proposition 21	Expands local governments' power to use rent control.	6,770,958	40.15	10,094,634	59.85	Citizen-initiated state statute
Proposition 22	Considers app-based drivers to be independent contractors and enacts several labor policies related to app-based companies.	9,957,858	58.63	7,027,467	41.37	Citizen-initiated state statute
Proposition 23	Requires physician on-site at dialysis clinics and consent from the state for a clinic to close.	6,161,109	36.58	10,683,606	63.42	Citizen-initiated state statute
Proposition 24	Expands the provisions of the California Consumer Privacy Act and creates the California Privacy Protection Agency to implement and enforce CCPA.	9,384,125	56.23	7,305,026	43.77	Citizen-initiated state statute
Proposition 25	Replaces cash bail with risk assessments for suspects awaiting trial.	7,231,044	43.59	9,356,096	56.41	Veto referendum
Source: California Secretary of State
