= 2018 California Proposition 8 =

Ballot measure on kidney dialysis clinic regulation

Proposition 8
- Limits on Dialysis Clinics' Revenue and Required Refunds Initiative

Results
Choice	Votes	%
Yes	4,845,264	40.07%
No	7,247,917	59.93%
Total votes	12,093,181	100.00%
County results
Yes
50–60%
No
70–80%
60–70%
50–60%

Proposition 8, also known as the Limits on Dialysis Clinics' Revenue and Required Refunds Initiative and Prop 8, was a California ballot proposition intended to authorize state regulation of kidney dialysis clinics and limit charges for patient care. It failed in the November 2018 California elections.

The proposition was sponsored by the Service Employees International Union and would have required dialysis clinics in California to give rebates to insurers and pay a fee to the state on any business revenue that went over 115% of the cost to provide care. Two major companies that made up 72% of the dialysis market in the state - DaVita Inc. and Fresenius Medical Care - paid over $110 million to a campaign designed to beat the proposition. This was the most money raised for a campaign like this in California's history. Supporters of the proposition argued that it would incentivize clinics to spend more money on better quality equipment and training for employees. Two major supporters of Prop 8 were CalPERS and the California Labor Federation. Major opponents of the measure were California Medical Association, National Kidney Foundation and American Renal Management LLC.

== Results ==
Proposition 8
Choice	Votes	%
No	7,247,917	59.93
Yes	4,845,264	40.07
Valid votes	12,093,181	100
Total votes	12,093,181	100.00

== See also ==
- 2020 California Proposition 23 – Ballot measure on dialysis
- 2022 California Proposition 29
