= 2020 California Proposition 13 =

$15 billion bond initiative for educational facility maintenance

Proposition 13
- Public Preschool, K-12, and College Health and Safety Bond Act of 2020
- Outcome: Ballot measure rejected.

Results
Choice	Votes	%
Yes	4,304,013	46.99%
No	4,856,154	53.01%
Valid votes	9,160,167	100.00%
Invalid or blank votes	0	0.00%
Total votes	9,160,167	100.00%
County results
For
70%–80%
60%–70%
50%–60%
Against
80%–90%
70%–80%
60%–70%
50%–60%

Proposition 13 (officially named as the "Public Preschool, K-12, and College Health and Safety Bond Act of 2020") was a failed California ballot proposition on the March 3, 2020, ballot that would have authorized the issuance of $15 billion in bonds to finance capital improvements for public and charter schools statewide. The proposition would have also raised the borrowing limit for some school districts and eliminated school impact fees for multifamily housing near transit stations.

The "yes" campaign had widespread support amongst political, education and business organizations and spent roughly $10 million to support the measure. The "no" campaign was chiefly led by the Howard Jarvis Taxpayers Association, who spent $250,000 to oppose the measure.

Proposition 13 was defeated, becoming the first school bond rejected by California's voters since 1994.

== The measure ==
The initiative was placed on the ballot after a bipartisan vote on Assembly Bill 48 by the state legislature. Proposition 13 would have allowed the state to borrow $15 billion by selling general obligation bonds, and would have then allocated $9 billion for K-12 facilities statewide as well as $2 billion for the state's community college system, $2 billion for the University of California and $2 billion for the California State University. Of the $9 billion earmarked for preschool and K-12 schools, $5.2 billion would have gone towards renovating existing facilities, $2.8 billion would have gone towards new school construction, and the remaining $1 billion would have been evenly split between career technical sites and charter schools. Smaller preschool and K-12 schools would have received priority for funding. The Legislative Analyst's Office projected the measure would have cost California taxpayers $740 million a year for 35 years which would be repaid from the state's general fund at an annual interest rate of roughly 3.5 percent.

Academics said the measure would have helped address a backlog of maintenance projects that would cost $117 billion to be fully addressed over the following decade. The measure would have funded asbestos removal, seismic retrofitting and other capital improvements on various California preschool, K-12, and college campuses.

The measure contained provisions that would have eliminated school impact fees on multifamily housing development within half a mile of train and bus stations. Education finance experts said the fees are essential for properly funding the impact of new students. Developers said the fees unnecessarily drive up the cost of new housing. The author of Proposition 13, Patrick O'Donnell, said the effect of impact fee elimination should have been closely watched and corrected if necessary.

The measure would have also loosened limits on local school district borrowing. High school and elementary school districts would have been allowed to borrow 2 percent of the assessed value of nearby properties, up from 1.25 percent. Unified school districts, along with community college districts, would have been able to borrow 4 percent of the assessed value of nearby properties, up from 2.5 percent. The measure would have capped administrative costs at 5 percent, or $750 million total.

School districts that were less able to raise funding for construction projects or with underserved student populations (being determined by the percent of low-income students, foster youth or English language learners in the district) would have been eligible for matching state funds, for upwards of 55 to 65 percent of the total project cost. The initiative required unionized labor for these projects.

Supporters said that these improvements would have made public schools safer and healthier. Opponents said that the actual total cost of the bonds plus interest would have exceeded $27 billion, which was more expensive than using funds directly from the regular state budget which had a $21 billion surplus at the time of the election.

== Polling ==
Poll source	Date(s) administered	Sample size (Note: Key: A – all adults RV – registered voters LV – likely voters V – unclear)	Margin of error	For Proposition 13	Against Proposition 13	Undecided
Public Policy Institute of California	February 7–17, 2020	1,046 (LV)	± 4.4%	51%	42%	8%
Public Policy Institute of California	January 3–12, 2020	967 (LV)	± 4.6%	53%	36%	10%
Public Policy Institute of California	November 3–12, 2019	1,008 (LV)	± 4.3%	48%	36%	16%
Public Policy Institute of California	September 16–25, 2019	1,031 (LV)	± 4.2%	54%	40%	6%

== Result ==
Proposition 13
Choice	Votes	%
For	4,304,013	46.99
Against	4,856,154	53.01
Total	9,160,167	100.00

Proposition 13 results (excluding invalid votes)
Yes; 4,304,013 (47%)	No; 4,856,154 (53%)
▲50%

Proposition 13 was defeated, becoming the first school bond rejected by California's voters since 1994.

Supporters of the measure said voters' confusion over the numbering led to the idea that it was a disguised repeal of the popular Proposition 13 which passed in 1978, leading to its defeat. Opponents said voters were concerned about how the measure would have raised taxes and the cost of living by increasing local school districts' debt limits.

Assemblyman O'Donnell announced his intention to introduce a bill that would retire the number '13' for future ballot initiatives to avoid possible confusion, a position supported by the Howard Jarvis Taxpayers Association, the main opponent of the failed 2020 measure and an advocate for the famous 1978 ballot initiative.
