= National Union of Healthcare Workers =

American healthcare workers' labor union

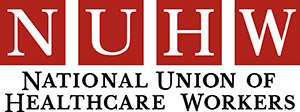
- Abbreviation: NUHW
- Formation: 2009
- Type: Trade union
- Headquarters: Emeryville, California, U.S.
- Location: California, U.S.
- Members: 18,752 (2025)
- President: Vanessa Coe
- Website: home.nuhw.org

National Union of Healthcare Workers (NUHW) is an American labor union based in Emeryville, California. It was formed in 2009 after a split with SEIU United Healthcare Workers West following that local's placement in trusteeship by the Service Employees International Union (SEIU). In its annual filing for fiscal year 2025, NUHW reported 18,752 members to the Office of Labor-Management Standards of the U.S. Department of Labor.

== History ==
According to NUHW's official history, the union traces its lineage to the Hospital & Institutional Workers Union that emerged in San Francisco after the 1934 San Francisco General Strike. That organization was chartered in 1938 as Local 250, later expanded throughout California, and in 2005 merged with Southern California's Local 399 to form SEIU United Healthcare Workers West. In 2006, registered nurses and other professional workers from Local 535 joined the statewide local.

The immediate dispute that led to NUHW's formation centered on governance, bargaining strategy, and SEIU's restructuring of California healthcare locals. On January 28, 2009, the Los Angeles Times reported that SEIU had placed United Healthcare Workers West in trusteeship and removed its leaders from office. Former UHW leaders and supporters then established NUHW as a separate union.

In Labor's Civil War in California, labor historian Cal Winslow wrote that NUHW held its founding convention in San Francisco on April 25, 2009, where delegates adopted a provisional constitution and bylaws emphasizing member control over the union and collective bargaining.

NUHW's early years were marked by representation contests with SEIU, especially at Kaiser Permanente. In January 2010, about 2,000 Kaiser nurses and healthcare professionals in Southern California voted by more than 6 to 1 to leave SEIU and join NUHW. NUHW later sought to replace SEIU-UHW in a much larger statewide Kaiser bargaining unit. The National Labor Relations Board ordered a rerun of the 2010 statewide Kaiser election, and SEIU-UHW prevailed in the rerun held in 2013.

== Membership ==
NUHW's annual filings with the U.S. Department of Labor report the following year-end membership totals. The 2010 figure is taken from the amended filing.

Year-end membership
Year	Members	Change
2009	0	—
2010	7,324	+7,324
2011	8,580	+1,256
2012	8,573	−7
2013	9,944	+1,371
2014	10,616	+672
2015	11,853	+1,237
2016	12,763	+910
2017	14,101	+1,338
2018	14,518	+417
2019	15,434	+916
2020	15,074	−360
2021	15,166	+92
2022	16,510	+1,344
2023	18,538	+2,028
2024	19,119	+581
2025	18,752	−367

== Staff union ==
NUHW's own employees are represented by a separate labor organization, NUHW Staff United (NSU). Public annual reports filed with the U.S. Department of Labor use that name and abbreviation for the staff union. The 2025 annual report listed 36 members at year end.
