= 2022 California Proposition 28 =

Proposition to provide funding in California, US

Proposition 28
- November 8, 2022
- Public School Arts and Music Education and Funding

Results
Choice	Votes	%
Yes	6,924,618	64.40%
No	3,827,971	35.60%
Valid votes	10,752,589	96.47%
Invalid or blank votes	394,031	3.53%
Total votes	11,146,620	100.00%
Registered voters/turnout	21,940,274	50.8%

Yes
50–60%
60–70%
70–80%
80–90%
No
50–60%
- Source: Statement of Vote at the Wayback Machine (archived December 17, 2022)

Proposition 28, also known as Art and Music K-12 Education Funding Initiative and Prop 28, was a California ballot proposition intended to provide yearly funding for art and music education in all K-12 public schools in California. The measure passed in the November 2022 California elections.

== Description ==
The annual amount of funding required would have been equal to 1% of the required state and local funding for public schools as laid out by 1988's California Proposition 98. The funds would have been distributed so that schools that serve economically disadvantaged students got a greater proportion of the funds. Schools with 500 or more students would have been required to spend 80% of the funds received on employing teachers and the other 20% on training and supplies. The measure put almost $1 billion in new funding from the state's general fund towards arts and music education. It also requires public reports from schools to show that the funds are being spent appropriately.

== Support and opposition ==
Prop 28 was backed by the Service Employees International Union and California's Democratic Party. There was no official opposition to the measure. The Yes on 28 Committee featured many celebrities, such as Dr. Dre, John Lithgow, and Will.i.am. The measure did not raise taxes.
