= 2020 California Proposition 20 =

Rejected initiative regarding non-violent felonies

Proposition 20
- November 3, 2020
- Restricts Parole for Non-Violent Offenders. Authorizes Felony Sentences for Certain Offenses Currently Treated Only as Misdemeanors.

Results
Choice	Votes	%
Yes	6,385,421	38.28%
No	10,293,563	61.72%
County results
For
60–70%
50–60%
Against
70–80%
60–70%
50–60%

California Proposition 20 was a proposed initiated state statute on the ballot in the 2020 California elections. This initiative would have added more crimes to the list of non-violent felonies for which early parole is restricted, and would have required DNA collection for certain misdemeanors.

According to its ballot summary, Proposition 20 would have

- limited access to parole programs established for non-violent offenders who have completed the full term of their primary offense by eliminating eligibility for certain offenses;
- changed the standards and requirements related to Parole in California;
- authorized felony charges in cases of retail theft where the value of stolen goods is between $250 and $950; and
- would have required individuals convicted of certain misdemeanors to submit DNA to a state database.

Proposition 20 was decisively rejected by 62% of Californians, a margin of 24 percentage points. Observers partly attributed its failure to the George Floyd protests bringing negative attention to punitive criminal justice policies.

== Support ==
This measure was being supported by law enforcement unions, grocery store chains, and current California State Assembly member and former law enforcement officer Jim Cooper.

Proponents cited that these changes are to close exceptions in the original text of Proposition 47 that allowed access to early parole or probation for individuals convicted of sex trafficking of children, rape of an unconscious person, felony assault with a deadly weapon, battery on a police officer or freighter, and felony domestic violence.

== Opposition ==
The measure was opposed by the Chan Zuckerberg Initiative, former governor Jerry Brown, and the American Civil Liberties Union. The Los Angeles Times announced its opposition to the Proposition in October 2020.

Opponents cited the impact that the COVID-19 pandemic has had on crowded prisons, and argue that prisons should not hold any more people than they already do. In addition, they also cite the disparate impact that America's criminal justice system has on African Americans, a concern that has increased in the wake of the murder of George Floyd.

According to opponents Proposition 20 would have increased the prison population, thereby increasing state and local court, correctional, and law enforcement costs by tens of millions of dollars annually. Had it passed, it would have partially reversed the results of Proposition 47, Proposition 57, and other legislation that have been intended to reduce the prison population and shift the correctional system from a punitive system to a rehabilitative system.

== Polling ==
In order to pass, it needs a simple majority (>50%).

On proposition 20

Poll source	Date(s) administered	Sample size (Note: Key: A – all adults RV – registered voters LV – likely voters V – unclear)	Margin of error	For Proposition 20	Against Proposition 20	Undecided
SurveyUSA	September 26–28, 2020	588 (LV)	± 5.4%	35%	22%	43%

On expanding the list of violent crimes for which early release from prison is not an option

Poll source	Date(s) administered	Sample size	Margin of error	For	Against	Undecided
Ipsos/Spectrum News	October 7–15, 2020	1,400 (A)	± 3%	59%	25%	16%

On charging repeat theft, when someone is caught for the 3rd time stealing something worth at least $250, as a felony

Poll source	Date(s) administered	Sample size	Margin of error	For	Against	Undecided
Ipsos/Spectrum News	October 7–15, 2020	1,400 (A)	± 3%	61%	24%	15%
