= 2022 California elections =

- November 8, 2022
- Registered: 21,940,274
- Turnout: 50.80% (▼29.87 pp)

Turnout map of registered voters for the general elections by county

Elections were held in California on November 8, 2022. The statewide direct primary election was held on June 7, 2022.

California voters elected all of California's seats to the United States House of Representatives, one seat to the United States Senate, all of the seats of the California State Assembly, all even-numbered seats of the California State Senate, and the Governor of California, as well as various statewide offices.

Pursuant to Proposition 14 passed in 2010, California uses a nonpartisan blanket primary for its races. All the candidates for the same elected office, regardless of respective political party, run against each other at once during the primary. The candidates receiving the most and second-most votes in the primary election then become the contestants in the general election.

== United States Congress ==
=== Senate ===
Incumbent Democratic senator Alex Padilla was appointed to the seat in 2021 after his predecessor Kamala Harris resigned to become Vice President of the United States. He intended to run for election to a full term. Harris was first elected in 2016 with 61.6% of the vote.

There were two elections on the ballot for the same Class 3 seat: a special election for the remainder of Harris's term expiring on January 3, 2023 and a general election for the full term ending on January 3, 2029. Padilla handily won both elections against Mark Meuser.

==== Special election ====
2022 United States Senate special election in California
Primary election
Party	Candidate	Votes	%
Democratic	Alex Padilla (incumbent)	3,740,582	55.0
Republican	Mark P. Meuser	1,503,480	22.1
Republican	James P. Bradley	472,052	6.9
Republican	Jon Elist	403,722	5.9
Democratic	Timothy Ursich Jr.	226,447	3.3
Democratic	Dan O'Dowd	191,531	2.8
Republican	Myron L. Hall	143,038	2.1
No party preference	Daphne Bradford	112,191	1.7
Peace and Freedom	John Parker (write-in)	9,951	0.1
No party preference	Irene Ratliff (write-in)	12	0.0
Total votes		6,803,006	100.0
General election
Democratic	Alex Padilla (incumbent)	6,559,308	60.9
Republican	Mark P. Meuser	4,212,450	39.1
Total votes		10,771,758	100.0
Democratic hold			

==== Regular election ====
Results by county: Padilla: 50–60%; 60–70%; 70–80%; 80–90%; Meuser: 50–60%; 60–70%; 70–80%

United States Senator regular election
Primary election
Party	Candidate	Votes	%
Democratic	Alex Padilla (incumbent)	3,725,544	54.1
Republican	Mark P. Meuser	1,028,374	14.9
Republican	Cordie Williams	474,321	6.9
Republican	Jon Elist	289,716	4.2
Republican	Chuck Smith	266,766	3.9
Republican	James P. Bradley	235,788	3.4
Democratic	Douglas Howard Pierce	116,771	1.7
Peace and Freedom	John Parker	105,477	1.5
Republican	Sarah Sun Liew	76,994	1.1
Democratic	Dan O'Dowd	74,916	1.1
Democratic	Akinyemi Agbede	70,971	1.0
Republican	Myron L. Hall	66,161	1.0
Democratic	Timothy J. Ursich	58,348	0.8
Republican	Robert George Lucero Jr.	53,398	0.8
Green	James "Henk" Conn	35,983	0.5
No party preference	Eleanor Garcia (Note: Garcia is listed on the ballot as a "no party preference" candidate because the Socialist Workers Party did not have ballot access in California at the time the ballot was printed.)	34,625	0.5
Republican	Carlos Guillermo Tapia	33,870	0.5
Green	Pamela Elizondo	31,981	0.5
Republican	Enrique Petris	31,883	0.5
Democratic	Obaidul Huq Pirjada	27,889	0.4
No party preference	Daphne Bradford	26,900	0.4
No party preference	Don J. Grundmann (Note: Grundmann is listed on the ballot as a "no party preference" candidate because the Constitution Party did not have ballot access in California at the time the ballot was printed.)	10,181	0.1
No party preference	Deon D. Jenkins	6,936	0.1
No party preference	Mark A. Ruzon (write-in)	206	0.0
Republican	Lijun Zhou (write-in)	58	0.0
No party preference	Irene Ratliff (write-in)	7	0.0
No party preference	Marc Alexander Roth (write-in)	1	0.0
Total votes		6,884,065	100.0
General election
Democratic	Alex Padilla (incumbent)	6,621,621	61.1
Republican	Mark P. Meuser	4,222,029	38.9
Total votes		10,843,650	100.0
Democratic hold			

=== House of Representatives ===
All of California's seats to the United States House of Representatives were up for election to two-year terms. Due to the results of the 2020 United States census, California had 52 seats up for election, a loss of one seat. This was the first time the state lost a congressional delegation in its history. Six members of Congress chose not to run for re-election, including Democrat Karen Bass, who instead ran for mayor of Los Angeles.

Although Democrats would hold the majority of the state's delegation, Republicans would win both open districts created through redistricting, as well as retain vulnerable districts that voted for Joe Biden in 2020.

== Statewide constitutional offices ==
=== Governor ===
Results by county: Newsom: 50–60%; 60–70%; 70–80%; 80–90%; Dahle: 50–60%; 60–70%; 70–80%; 80–90%

Incumbent Democratic governor Gavin Newsom ran for re-election. Newsom was first elected in 2018 with 61.9% of the vote. He faced a recall election in 2021 in which he prevailed. He was comfortably reelected in 2022 over state Senator Brian Dahle.

Gubernatorial election
Primary election
Party	Candidate	Votes	%
Democratic	Gavin Newsom (incumbent)	3,945,728	55.9
Republican	Brian Dahle	1,252,800	17.7
No party preference	Michael Shellenberger	290,286	4.1
Republican	Jenny Rae Le Roux	246,665	3.5
Republican	Anthony Trimino	246,322	3.5
Republican	Shawn Collins	173,083	2.5
Green	Luis J. Rodriguez	124,672	1.8
Republican	Leo S. Zacky	94,521	1.3
Republican	Major Williams	92,580	1.3
Republican	Robert C. Newman II	82,849	1.2
Democratic	Joel Ventresca	66,885	0.9
Republican	David Lozano	66,542	0.9
Republican	Ronald A. Anderson	53,554	0.8
No party preference	Reinette Senum	53,015	0.8
Democratic	Armando "Mando" Perez-Serrato	45,474	0.6
Republican	Ron Jones	38,337	0.5
Republican	Daniel R. Mercuri	36,396	0.5
Green	Heather Collins	29,690	0.4
Democratic	Anthony "Tony" Fanara	25,086	0.4
Republican	Cristian Raul Morales	22,304	0.3
Republican	Lonnie Sortor	21,044	0.3
No party preference	Frederic C. Schultz	17,502	0.2
No party preference	Woodrow "Woody" Sanders III	16,204	0.2
No party preference	James G. Hanink	10,110	0.1
No party preference	Serge Fiankan	6,201	0.1
No party preference	Bradley Zink	5,997	0.1
American Independent	Jeff Scott (write-in)	13	0.0
Republican	Gurinder Bhangoo (write-in)	8	0.0
Total votes		7,063,868	100.0
General election
Democratic	Gavin Newsom (incumbent)	6,470,104	59.2
Republican	Brian Dahle	4,462,914	40.8
Total votes		10,933,018	100.0
Democratic hold			

=== Lieutenant governor ===
Results by county: Kounalakis: 50–60%; 60–70%; 70–80%; 80–90%; Jacobs: 50–60%; 60–70%; 70–80%; 80–90%

Incumbent Democratic lieutenant governor Eleni Kounalakis ran for re-election. She was first elected in 2018 with 56.6% of the vote. She was reelected with 59.7% of the vote over Lancaster City Councilwoman Angela E. Underwood Jacobs.

Lieutenant gubernatorial election
Primary election
Party	Candidate	Votes	%
Democratic	Eleni Kounalakis (incumbent)	3,617,121	52.7
Republican	Angela E. Underwood Jacobs	1,365,468	19.9
Republican	David Fennell	922,493	13.4
Republican	Clint W. Saunders	306,216	4.5
Democratic	Jeffrey Highbear Morgan	229,121	3.3
Peace and Freedom	Mohammad Arif	183,150	2.7
Democratic	William Cavett "Skee" Saacke	171,800	2.5
No party preference	David Hillberg	74,289	1.1
No party preference	James Orlando Ogle (write-in)	25	0.0
Total votes		6,869,683	100.0
General election
Democratic	Eleni Kounalakis (incumbent)	6,418,119	59.7
Republican	Angela E. Underwood Jacobs	4,332,602	40.3
Total votes		10,750,721	100.0
Democratic hold			

=== Attorney general ===
Results by county: Bonta: 50–60%; 60–70%; 70–80%; 80–90%; Hochman: 50–60%; 60–70%; 70–80%

Incumbent Democratic attorney general Rob Bonta was appointed in 2021 after his predecessor Xavier Becerra resigned to become U.S. Secretary of Health and Human Services. He intended to run for election to a full term. Becerra won election to a full term in 2018 with 63.6% of the vote. He won a second term over former Assistant U.S. Attorney Nathan Hochman.

Attorney General election
Primary election
Party	Candidate	Votes	%
Democratic	Rob Bonta (incumbent)	3,756,486	54.3
Republican	Nathan Hochman	1,256,465	18.2
Republican	Eric Early	1,142,747	16.5
No party preference	Anne Marie Schubert	539,746	7.8
Green	Dan Kapelovitz	219,912	3.2
Total votes		6,915,356	100.0
General election
Democratic	Rob Bonta (incumbent)	6,339,441	59.1
Republican	Nathan Hochman	4,390,428	40.9
Total votes		10,729,869	100.0
Democratic hold			

=== Secretary of state ===
Results by county: Weber: 50–60%; 60–70%; 70–80%; 80–90%; Bernosky: 50–60%; 60–70%; 70–80%

Incumbent Democratic secretary of state Shirley Weber was appointed in 2021 after her predecessor Alex Padilla resigned to become a U.S. senator. She intended to run for election to a full term. Padilla was re-elected in 2018 with 64.5% of the vote.

Secretary of State election
Primary election
Party	Candidate	Votes	%
Democratic	Shirley Weber (incumbent)	4,016,798	58.9
Republican	Rob Bernosky	1,281,587	18.8
Republican	Rachel Hamm	822,978	12.1
Republican	James "JW" Paine	254,222	3.7
Green	Gary N. Blenner	205,630	3.0
Republican	Raul Rodriguez Jr.	176,059	2.6
No party preference	Matthew D. Cinquanta	59,481	0.9
No party preference	Desmond A. Silveira (write-in)	235	0.0
Total votes		6,816,990	100.0
General election
Democratic	Shirley Weber (incumbent)	6,462,164	60.1
Republican	Rob Bernosky	4,298,530	39.9
Total votes		10,760,694	100.0
Democratic hold			

=== Treasurer ===
Results by county: Ma: 50–60%; 60–70%; 70–80%; 80–90%; Guerrero: 50–60%; 60–70%; 70–80%

Incumbent Democratic treasurer Fiona Ma ran for re-election. She was first elected in 2018 with 64.1% of the vote. She won a second term in 2022 over Cudahy City Councilman Jack M. Guerrero, who had upset Orange County Supervisor Andrew Do in the primary.

Treasurer election
Primary election
Party	Candidate	Votes	%
Democratic	Fiona Ma (incumbent)	3,903,967	57.4
Republican	Jack M. Guerrero	1,489,533	21.9
Republican	Andrew Do	1,157,620	17.0
Peace and Freedom	Meghann Adams	245,369	3.6
Total votes		6,796,489	100.0
General election
Democratic	Fiona Ma (incumbent)	6,287,076	58.8
Republican	Jack M. Guerrero	4,405,781	41.2
Total votes		10,692,857	100.0
Democratic hold			

=== Controller ===
Results by county: Cohen: 50–60%; 60–70%; 70–80%; Chen: 50–60%; 60–70%; 70–80%; 80–90%

Incumbent Democratic controller Betty Yee was term-limited and could not run for re-election. She had been re-elected in 2018 with 65.5% of the vote.

Controller election
Primary election
Party	Candidate	Votes	%
Republican	Lanhee Chen	2,533,305	37.22
Democratic	Malia Cohen	1,542,397	22.66
Democratic	Yvonne Yiu	1,024,707	15.06
Democratic	Steve Glazer	756,518	11.12
Democratic	Ron Galperin	690,484	10.15
Green	Laura Wells	258,053	3.79
Total votes		6,805,464	100.00
General election
Democratic	Malia Cohen	5,936,856	55.35
Republican	Lanhee Chen	4,789,345	44.65
Total votes		10,726,201	100.00
Democratic hold			

=== Insurance Commissioner ===
Results by county: Lara: 50–60%; 60–70%; 70–80%; 80–90%; Howell: 50–60%; 60–70%; 70–80%

Incumbent Democratic Insurance Commissioner Ricardo Lara ran for re-election. He was first elected in 2018 with 52.9% of the vote.

Insurance Commissioner election
Primary election
Party	Candidate	Votes	%
Democratic	Ricardo Lara (incumbent)	2,414,744	35.9
Republican	Robert Howell	1,216,322	18.1
Democratic	Marc Levine	1,208,645	18.0
Republican	Greg Conlon	1,086,683	16.2
Democratic	Vinson Eugene Allen	258,040	3.8
Peace and Freedom	Nathalie Hrizi	190,414	2.8
Green	Veronika Fimbres	129,762	1.9
Democratic	Jasper "Jay" Jackson	124,955	1.9
No party preference	Robert J. Molnar	94,163	1.4
Total votes		6,723,728	100.0
General election
Democratic	Ricardo Lara (incumbent)	6,355,915	59.9
Republican	Robert Howell	4,249,391	40.1
Total votes		10,605,306	100.0
Democratic hold			

=== Superintendent of Public Instruction ===
Results by county: Thurmond: 50–60%; 60–70%; 70–80%; 80–90%; Christensen: 50–60%

Incumbent Democratic Superintendent Tony Thurmond ran for re-election. He was first elected in 2018 with 50.9% of the vote.

Superintendent of Public Instruction election
Party	Candidate	Votes	%
Nonpartisan	Tony Thurmond (incumbent)	2,881,684	45.9
Nonpartisan	Lance Christensen	745,003	11.9
Nonpartisan	Ainye E. Long	699,331	11.1
Nonpartisan	George Yang	694,073	11.1
Nonpartisan	Marco Amaral	547,389	8.7
Nonpartisan	Jim Gibson	468,078	7.5
Nonpartisan	Joseph Guy Campbell	241,984	3.9
Total votes		6,277,542	100.0

Superintendent of Public Instruction runoff election
Party	Candidate	Votes	%
Nonpartisan	Tony Thurmond (incumbent)	5,681,318	63.7
Nonpartisan	Lance Christensen	3,237,785	36.3
Total votes		8,919,103	100.0

== Board of Equalization ==
All four seats on the California State Board of Equalization were up for election, with all four incumbents eligible for re-election.

=== District 1 ===
Incumbent Republican Ted Gaines ran for re-election. He was first elected in 2018 with 51.4% of the vote.

Board of Equalization District 1 election
Primary election
Party	Candidate	Votes	%
Republican	Ted Gaines (incumbent)	858,912	55.1
Democratic	Jose S. Altamirano	334,818	21.5
Democratic	Braden Murphy	225,428	14.5
Democratic	Nader Shahatit	139,922	9.0
Total votes		1,559,080	100.0
General election
Republican	Ted Gaines (incumbent)	1,390,533	55.5
Democratic	Jose S. Altamirano	1,114,423	44.5
Total votes		2,504,956	100.0
Republican hold			

=== District 2 ===
Incumbent Democrat Malia Cohen retired to run for state controller. She was first elected in 2018 with 72.8% of the vote.

Board of Equalization District 2 election
Primary election
Party	Candidate	Votes	%
Democratic	Sally Lieber	1,034,551	53.0
Republican	Peter Coe Verbica	549,455	28.2
Democratic	Michela Alioto-Pier	366,406	18.8
Total votes		1,950,412	100.0
General election
Democratic	Sally Lieber	2,146,948	69.8
Republican	Peter Coe Verbica	927,700	30.2
Total votes		3,074,648	100.0
Democratic hold			

=== District 3 ===
Incumbent Democrat Tony Vazquez ran for re-election. He was first elected in 2018 with 69.9% of the vote.

Board of Equalization District 3 election
Primary election
Party	Candidate	Votes	%
Democratic	Tony Vazquez (incumbent)	849,250	66.5
No party preference	Y. Marie Manvel	275,830	21.6
Democratic	John Mendoza	144,153	11.3
Republican	G. Rick Marshall (write-in)	8,769	0.7
Total votes		1,278,002	100.0
General election
Democratic	Tony Vazquez (incumbent)	1,484,626	70.4
No party preference	Y. Marie Manvel	623,017	29.6
Total votes		2,107,643	100.0
Democratic hold			

=== District 4 ===
Incumbent Democrat Mike Schaefer ran for re-election. He was first elected in 2018 with 52.2% of the vote in an upset.

Board of Equalization District 4 election
Primary election
Party	Candidate	Votes	%
Democratic	Mike Schaefer (incumbent)	597,948	35.9
Democratic	David Dodson	249,971	15.0
Republican	Denis R. Bilodeau	236,625	14.2
Republican	Matthew Harper	183,330	11.0
Republican	Erik Peterson	180,278	10.8
Republican	Randell R. Economy	109,975	6.6
Republican	John F. Kelly	107,319	6.4
Total votes		1,665,446	100.0
General election
Democratic	Mike Schaefer (incumbent)	1,241,062	58.8
Democratic	David Dodson	867,945	41.2
Total votes		2,109,007	100.0
Democratic hold			

== State legislature ==
=== State Senate ===

Results by senate districts (top) and assembly districts (bottom).
Legend
- Democratic hold
- Democratic gain
- Republican hold
- Republican gain
- No election held

Californians elected all even-numbered seats to the California State Senate to four-year terms. Seven senators were term-limited in 2022, while two chose to retire early to run for higher office. Democrats would make a net gain of one seat, retaining their supermajority.

California State Senate
Party	Leader	Before	After	Change
Democratic	Toni Atkins	31	32	▲1
Republican	Scott Wilk	9	8	▼1
Total		40	40	Steady

=== State Assembly ===
Californians elected all of the seats to the California State Assembly to two-year terms. 17 incumbent assemblymembers chose not to run for re-election. Democrats increased their supermajority by two seats.

California State Assembly
Party	Leader	Before	After	Change
Democratic	Anthony Rendon	60	62	▲2
Republican	James Gallagher	19	18	▼1
Independent		1	0	▼1
Total		80	80	Steady

== Propositions ==
In 2022, state propositions only appeared on the general election ballot. Pursuant to a November 2011 law, only propositions placed on the ballot by the state legislature may appear on the primary ballot, and the legislative body did not do so in 2022.

The following propositions qualified to appear on the general election ballot:

2022 California propositions
Name	Description	Votes				Type
Name	Description	Yes	%	No	%	Type
Proposition 1	Provides a state constitutional right to reproductive freedom, defined to include abortion and contraceptives.	7,176,888	66.88	3,553,564	33.12	Legislatively referred constitutional amendment
Proposition 26	Legalizes sports betting at American Indian gaming casinos and licensed racetracks in California.	3,514,597	33.02	7,129,127	66.98	Combined initiated constitutional amendment and state statute
Proposition 27	Legalizes online and mobile sports betting in the state.	1,906,342	17.72	8,849,206	82.28	Combined initiated constitutional amendment and state statute
Proposition 28	Requires annual funding for arts and music education in all K-12 public schools.	6,924,618	64.40	3,827,971	35.60	Citizen-initiated state statute
Proposition 29	Enacts staffing requirements, reporting requirements, ownership disclosure, and closing requirements for chronic dialysis clinics.	3,364,407	31.60	7,281,201	68.40	Citizen-initiated state statute
Proposition 30	Creates a 1.75% tax on personal income above $2 million and allocates revenue for zero-emissions vehicle and wildfire programs.	4,560,488	42.37	6,203,810	57.63	Citizen-initiated state statute
Proposition 31	Upholds Senate Bill 793 (2020), which banned the sale of flavored tobacco products in the state. Retailers would then be fined $250 for each sale that breaks this law.	6,803,431	63.42	3,923,385	36.58	Veto referendum
Source: California Secretary of State

== Judiciary ==
=== Supreme Court ===
==== Chief Justice ====
Results by county For: 50–60%; 60–70%; 70–80%; 80–90%; Against: 50–60%; 60–70%

Chief Justice Tani Cantil-Sakauye announced she would not run for retention, opting to retire at the end of her term. Governor Gavin Newsom appointed Associate Justice Patricia Guerrero as chief justice. Guerrero faced retention for a full 12-year term.

California Supreme Court, Chief Justice Patricia Guerrero Retention election
Choice	Votes	%
For	6,194,671	70.94
Against	2,537,627	29.06
Total	8,732,298	100.00

==== Associate Justice ====
Associate Justices Martin Jenkins and Goodwin Liu faced retention for full 12-year terms. Associate Justice Joshua Groban, after being appointed in 2018 by Governor Jerry Brown due to Associate Justice Kathryn Werdegar's retirement, faced retention for the remainder of Justice Werdegar's term, which expires in 2027.

===== Justice Groban retention =====
Results by county For: 50–60%; 60–70%; 70–80%; 80–90%; Against: 50–60%; 60–70%

California Supreme Court, Associate Justice Joshua Groban Retention election
Choice	Votes	%
For	5,664,354	68.03
Against	2,661,668	31.97
Total	8,326,022	100.00

===== Justice Jenkins retention =====
Results by county For: 50–60%; 60–70%; 70–80%; 80–90%; Against: 50–60%

California Supreme Court, Associate Justice Martin Jenkins Retention election
Choice	Votes	%
For	5,825,582	69.33
Against	2,576,601	30.67
Total	8,402,183	100.00

===== Justice Liu retention =====
Results by county For: 50–60%; 60–70%; 70–80%; 80–90%; Against: 50–60%; 60–70%

California Supreme Court, Associate Justice Goodwin Liu Retention election
Choice	Votes	%
For	5,908,904	69.26
Against	2,623,045	30.74
Total	8,531,949	100.00

== See also ==
- 2022 United States elections
