= 2020 California Proposition 23 =

Ballot measure on dialysis

Proposition 23
- November 3, 2020
- Protect the Lives of Dialysis Patients Act Initiative

Results
Choice	Votes	%
Yes	6,161,109	36.58%
No	10,683,606	63.42%
- County results Against 70%–80% 60%–70% 50%–60%

Proposition 23, officially the Protect the Lives of Dialysis Patients Act Initiative, is a California ballot proposition that appeared on the ballot for the general election on November 3, 2020. The proposition would increase regulations in Californian dialysis clinics, requiring them to have on-site physicians during treatment, report data on infections that might have been caused by dialyses, seek permission from the government of California prior to closing a clinic and strengthening anti-discrimination protections for dialysis patients.

An overwhelming majority of California voters rejected this measure, by a margin of 63% to 37%, a margin of 26 percentage points.

== Background ==
Among other regulations, discrimination against patients on the basis of the source of payment for their care would be explicitly outlawed.

Last Week Tonight with John Oliver outlined many of the problems inherent in the dialysis industry in California.

== Polling ==
In order to pass, it needs a simple majority (>50%).

Poll source	Date(s) administered	Sample size (Note: Key: A – all adults RV – registered voters LV – likely voters V – unclear)	Margin of error	For Proposition 23	Against Proposition 23	Undecided
SurveyUSA	September 26–28, 2020	588 (LV)	± 5.4%	49%	23%	28%

== See also ==
- SEIU United Healthcare Workers West § Ballot propositions
- 2018 California Proposition 8 – Ballot measure on kidney dialysis clinic regulation
- 2022 California Proposition 29
