= 2022 California Proposition 29 =

Proposition 29
- November 8, 2022
- Requires On-Site Licensed Medical Professional At Kidney Dialysis Clinics and Establishes Other State Requirements

Results
Choice	Votes	%
Yes	3,364,407	31.60%
No	7,281,201	68.40%
Valid votes	10,645,608	95.51%
Invalid or blank votes	501,012	4.49%
Total votes	11,146,620	100.00%
Registered voters/turnout	21,940,274	50.8%

No
80–90%
70–80%
60–70%
50–60%
Yes
50–60%

Proposition 29, also known as the Dialysis Clinic Requirements Initiative, was a California ballot proposition that appeared on the general election on November 8, 2022 that would have required staffing, reporting, ownership disclosure, and closing requirements including:

- requiring clinics to have at least one physician, nurse practitioner, or physician assistant – with at least six months of experience with end-stage renal disease care – onsite during patient treatments;
- requiring clinics to report dialysis-related infections to the California Department of Public Health (CDPH);
- requiring clinics to provide patients with a list of physicians with an ownership interest of 5% or more in the clinic;
- requiring clinics to provide the CDPH with a list of persons with ownership interest of 5% or more in the clinic; and
- requiring clinics to obtain the CDPH's written consent before closing or substantially reducing services to patients.

== Contents ==
The proposition appeared on the ballot as follows:

== Support and opposition ==
SEIU-UHW West supports proposition 29.

== Results ==
Proposition 29
Choice	Votes	%
For	1,603,413	30.10
Against	3,723,999	69.90
Total	5,327,412	100.00
Source: California Secretary of State as of 10:16 pm PST

Proposition 29 results (excluding invalid votes)
Yes; 1,603,413 (30.1%)	No; 3,723,999 (69.9%)
▲50%

== See also ==
- SEIU United Healthcare Workers West § Ballot propositions
- 2018 California Proposition 8 – Ballot measure on kidney dialysis clinic regulation
- 2020 California Proposition 23 – Ballot measure on dialysis
