= 2022 California Proposition 31 =

Proposition 31
November 8, 2022
- Referendum Challenging a 2020 Law Prohibiting Retail Sale Of Certain Flavored Tobacco Products

Results
Choice	Votes	%
Yes	6,803,431	63.42%
No	3,923,385	36.58%
Valid votes	10,726,816	96.23%
Invalid or blank votes	419,804	3.77%
Total votes	11,146,620	100.00%
Registered voters/turnout	21,940,274	50.8%

Yes
80–90%
70–80%
60–70%
50–60%
No
50–60%

Proposition 31 was a California ballot proposition regarding the regulation and prohibition of flavored tobacco that appeared on the 2022 general election ballot.

A "yes" vote supported limiting the retail sale of flavored tobacco while a "no" vote opposed such limits.

== Proposal ==
The proposition was a referendum on a 2020 California law, Senate Bill 793, that sought to ban the sale of most flavored tobacco products in stores and vending machines. Violations of the ban would result in fines of $250. Exemptions included hookah and loose-leaf tobacco.

== Responses ==
Supporters of the proposition included the California Teachers Association, the California Democratic Party, the Kaiser Foundation Health Plan, the American Cancer Society Cancer Action Network, Michael Bloomberg, and Gavin Newsom. Opponents of the proposition included the California Republican Party and tobacco companies including R. J. Reynolds Tobacco Company and Philip Morris USA.

== Results ==
County					Votes
County	Yes		No		Votes
County	Votes	Per.	Votes	Per.	Total
Alameda	358,943	75.6%	115,606	24.4%	474,549
Alpine	425	72.0%	165	28.0%	590
Amador	9,455	52.3%	8,617	47.7%	
Butte	34,962	56.1%	27,364	43.9%	
Calaveras	10,619	51.9%	9,855	48.1%	
Colusa	2,118	48.2%	2,272	51.8%	
Contra Costa	205,457	72.6%	77,436	27.4%	
Del Norte	3,030	49.4%	3,101	50.6%	
El Dorado	40,020	57.5%	29,585	42.5%	
Fresno	76,818	51.7%	71,887	48.3%	
Source: California Secretary of State
