= 2026 California Proposition 4 =

Proposition 4
- November 3, 2026
- Repeals prohibition against public funding of election campaigns. Legislative statute
- Reporting: 99%

Results
Choice	Votes	%
Yes	6,312,442	49.77%
No	6,369,982	50.23%

Proposition 4, also known as the Allow Public Financing of Election Campaigns Measure, is a legislatively referred state statute on the November 3, 2026, California general election ballot. The measure would reverse the 1988 ban on public funding of campaigns established by Proposition 73. It would allow California's state and local governments to establish public campaign funds for candidates that meet eligibility requirements and agree to spending limits.

The measure would prohibit public funds from being used for legal defense fees, fines, or the repayment of personal loans. Funding for such programs could not be drawn from money allocated to education, transportation, or public safety.

== Background ==
In California, the state legislature may amend or repeal a voter-approved initiative only if the initiative allows it. Otherwise, any change must be approved by voters. Proposition 73, which enacted the ban on public funding of election campaigns in 1988, does not allow amendments by the state legislature without voter approval.

In 2016, the state legislature attempted to repeal Proposition 73 by passing Senate Bill 1107. Courts overturned the bill, ruling that it did not follow the Political Reform Act of 1974, and that voters would have to approve changes to the proposition.

The state legislature placed the measure on the ballot through Senate Bill 42 with support by Gov. Gavin Newsom.

Public campaign financing programs exists in California for certain local elections. Other state and local governments across the United States also offer similar programs.

== Impact ==
The measure would reverse the 1988 ban on public funding of campaigns established by Proposition 73. It would allow California's state and local governments to establish public campaign funds for candidates that meet eligibility requirements and agree to spending limits.

The measure would prohibit public funds from being used for legal defense fees, fines, or the repayment of personal loans. Funding for such programs could not be drawn from money allocated to education, transportation, or public safety.

According to supporters, the measures aims to reduce the campaign costs that limit who can run for office and to open elections to a wider pool of candidates. Supporters argue that public financing programs reduce reliance on wealthy donors and special interests, encourage candidates to focus on voters rather than donors, and curb donor influence over government decisions.

Opponents argue that the measure could divert taxpayer money from other public services, and that taxpayer money should not be used for political campaigns.

== Endorsements ==
Yes

State officials

- Gavin Newsom, Governor of California

State legislators

- Tom Umberg, State Senator, author of SB 42
- Ben Allen, State Senator, co-author of SB 42
- Alex Lee, Assemblymember, co-author of SB 42
- Jerry McNerney, State Senator
- Sabrina Cervantes, State Senator

Local officials

- Adena Ishii, Mayor of Berkeley

Political parties

- California Democratic Party

Labor unions

- California Labor Federation
- California Nurses Association
- California Federation of Teachers
- AFSCME

Organizations

- League of Women Voters of California
- California Common Cause
- California Clean Money Campaign
- ACLU of California
- Asian Law Caucus
- California National Organization for Women
- California Environmental Voters
- Consumer Watchdog
- Courage California
- Dolores Huerta Foundation
- Indivisible CA: StateStrong
- Indivisible SF
- La Defensa
- Mental Health Advocacy
- Social Security Works

Newspapers and publications

- The Sacramento Bee
- San Francisco Bay Guardian
- Oakland Review of Books
No

Former officials

- Dan Schnur, former Chair of the California Fair Political Practices Commission
- Colleen McAndrews, former Commissioner of the California Fair Political Practices Commission

Organizations

- California Taxpayers Association
- Howard Jarvis Taxpayers Association
- California Hispanic Chambers of Commerce
- Family Business Association of California
- Reform California
- United Latinos Action

Newspapers and publications

- The Orange County Register
- The San Diego Union-Tribune
- San Francisco Chronicle
