= 2026 California Proposition 37 =

Ballot initiative

Proposition 37
- November 3, 2026
- Second Mortgage Homebuyer Program and Revenue Bond Initiative
- Reporting: 96% as of November 13, 2026 at 7:34 PM PST

Results
Choice	Votes	%
Yes	7,843,034	62.45%
No	4,715,544	37.55%
Total votes	12,558,578	100.00%
County results
Yes
70–80%
60–70%
50–60%
No
60–70%
50–60%

Proposition 37, also known as the Second Mortgage Homebuyer Program and Revenue Bond Initiative or the Middle-Class Homeownership and Family Home Construction Act, is an initiated state statute that appeared on the November 3, 2026, ballot in the state of California.

The initiative was approved by voters. It would create a second mortgage homebuyer program administered by the California Housing Finance Agency, who would have the ability to issue up to $25 billion in bonds to fund the program.

== Background ==
The initiative was sponsored by Robert Hertzberg, a Democrat who held leadership positions in both the state senate and state assembly. Hertzberg has stated that the initiative will help increase middle-class housing supply. In March 2026, the initiative qualified for the ballot after submitting around 900,000 signatures of support, almost double the 546,651 signatures required.

The initiative would establish a second mortgage homebuyer program, which would be run by the California Housing Finance Agency (CALHFA). The agency would able to issue up to US$25 billion in bonds to fund the program, which would offer eligible buyers fixed-rate mortgages for up to 17% of the purchase price of a "qualified new home". An eligible home must be either a new construction or a former non-residential property that has been converted and is selling for the first time. The home must be priced below around US$1–1.5 million, although that amount adjusts annually and differs for each of the state's counties. To be eligible for the program, a borrower must be a California resident for at least a year, plan to occupy the home, earn less than 200% of the local area's median income, and pay at least 3% up-front.

== Endorsements ==
Yes

Executive branch officials

- Xavier Becerra, former U.S. secretary of health and human services (2021–2025) (Democratic)

U.S. representatives

- Katie Porter, former CA-47 (2019–2025) (Democratic)

Statewide officials

- Tony Thurmond, superintendent of public instruction of California (2019–present) (Democratic)

State legislators

- Robert Hertzberg, former Senate majority leader (2019–2022) from SD-18 (2014–2022) (Democratic)
- Darrell Steinberg, former Senate president pro tempore (2008–2014) from SD-06 (2006–2014) (Democratic)

Local officials

- Matt Mahan, mayor of San Jose (2023–present) (Democratic)
- Antonio Villaraigosa, former mayor of Los Angeles (2005–2013) (Democratic)

Labor unions

- United Brotherhood of Carpenters and Joiners of America

Organizations

- California Association of Realtors
