= 2020 California Proposition 19 =

Successful property tax ballot initiative

California Proposition 19 (2020)
- November 3, 2020
- Assembly Constitutional Amendment No. 11. Changes tax assessment transfers and inheritance rules

Results
Choice	Votes	%
Yes	8,545,393	51.11%
No	8,175,618	48.89%
County results
For
60%–70%
50%–60%
Against
60%–70%
50%–60%

California Proposition 19 (2020), also referred to as Assembly Constitutional Amendment No. 11, is an amendment of the Constitution of California that was narrowly approved by voters in the general election on November 3, 2020, with just over 51% of the vote. The legislation increases the property tax burden on owners of inherited property to provide expanded property tax benefits to homeowners ages 55 years and older, disabled homeowners, and victims of natural disasters, and fund wildfire response. According to the California Legislative Analyst, Proposition 19 is a large net tax increase "of hundreds of millions of dollars per year."

According to the ballot summary, Proposition 19:

- Allows homeowners who are over 55 years of age (without regard to wealth), disabled, or victims of natural disasters to transfer their existing property tax assessed value under 1978 California Proposition 13 to a replacement home, including a more expensive home.
- Significantly limits the existing property tax benefits under Proposition 13 for certain real estate transfers between family members, such as the transfer of property from a parent to a child following the death of the parent.
- Expands property tax benefits for family farm transfers.
- Allocates net state (but not local) revenues and savings (if any) to wildfire response and for reimbursing local governments. However, because the COVID-19 pandemic has created significant uncertainty for the state budget, the Legislative Analyst believes that the vast majority of the wildfire funding will not be available until 2025 at the earliest.

The proposition was sponsored and heavily promoted by the California Association of Realtors, and became effective on February 16, 2021.

== Background ==
The California Association of Realtors previously sponsored and financed an initiative measure known as 2018 California Proposition 5 on the November 2018 ballot that would have further expanded Proposition 13 property tax breaks for certain homeowners (primarily homeowners over age 55) by allowing them to transfer their lower property tax base to replacement property. That ballot measure failed statewide with 40% support, and also failed to receive majority support in all 58 California counties. Proposition 5 opponents successfully argued that the initiative measure was a "huge tax break to wealthy Californians" and a "huge windfall to the real estate industry."

In 2019, the California Association of Realtors sponsored and financed another initiative measure that would have expanded Proposition 13 property tax breaks for certain homeowners like the 2018 California Proposition 5 ballot measure. However, to generate a net increase in property tax revenue, the initiative also significantly narrowed Proposition 13 property tax reassessment exclusion rules for inherited properties and expanded the scope of business entity ownership changes that would result in commercial property reassessment under Proposition 13. Initiative 19-0003 was withdrawn and replaced by ACA11 which did not receive legislative approval before the deadline on June 25, 2020 and an exemption was made by State Legislature through SB300 to place it on the November 3, 2020 ballot.

=== Assembly Constitutional Amendment No. 11 (ACA 11) ===
As allowed under California law, the California Association of Realtors negotiated with various special interests to secure legislative approval of an alternative constitutional amendment known as Assembly Constitutional Amendment No. 11 (ACA 11). Proposition 19 was added to the ballot via ACA 11 which was authored by San Mateo Assemblymember Kevin Mullin.

Significant controversy arose because the legislative approval of ACA 11 missed the regular legal deadline for placing measures on the November 2020 ballot, and the Legislature also had to enact a separate statute calling a special election for ACA 11 that was consolidated with the regular November 2020 election. In response to the approval and qualification of ACA 11 for the November 2020 ballot, the California Association of Realtors withdrew its 2019 initiative measure that was previously eligible to appear on the November 2020 ballot. The primary differences between Proposition 19 and the 2019 initiative measure withdrawn by the California Association of Realtors are that Proposition 19 excluded the expanded business entity ownership provisions that would have resulted in commercial property reassessment under Proposition 13 (to appease major business interests who did not like the business tax increase component of the 2019 initiative) and that Proposition 19 added the partial firefighting revenue provisions as a political sweetener (to appease firefighting organizations that previously opposed 2018 California Proposition 5).

Thus, compared to the 2019 initiative measure, Proposition 19 retained the expanded Proposition 13 property tax breaks for certain homeowners (primarily homeowners over age 55) like those contained in the defeated 2018 California Proposition 5 ballot measure, retained the property tax increase provisions by significantly narrowing Proposition 13 property tax reassessment exclusion rules for inherited properties, and added the partial firefighting revenue provisions as a political sweetener.

==== Legislative Votes on ACA 11 ====
In California, constitutional amendments proposed by the Legislature require approval from two-thirds of the membership of each house.

The following are the votes by the Members of the California Legislature on ACA 11, along with how the voters within the corresponding legislative district subsequently voted on Proposition 19:

===== California Assembly =====
Assembly votes are from the California Assembly Daily Journal and Proposition 19 outcomes are from the California Secretary of State. The vote designation of "Abstain" is for those Legislators present on the day of the vote, but who did not record a vote for or against ACA 11. The vote designation of "Absent" is for those Legislators who were absent on the day of the vote. Assembly districts are based on the applicable 2011 district. ACA11 was a "gut and amend" introduced by Phil Ting who Abstained.

District	Last Name	First Name	Party	ACA 11 Vote	Prop 19 Outcome
04	Aguiar-Curry	Cecilia	Dem	Yes	Pass
31	Arambula	Joaquin	Dem	Yes	Pass
16	Bauer-Kahan	Rebecca	Dem	Yes	Pass
24	Berman	Marc	Dem	Yes	Pass
05	Bigelow	Frank	Rep	Yes	Fail
50	Bloom	Richard	Dem	Abstain	Fail
76	Boerner-Horvath	Tasha	Dem	Abstain	Pass
18	Bonta	Rob	Dem	Yes	Pass
73	Brough	Bill	Rep	No	Fail
62	Burke	Autumn	Dem	Yes	Pass
57	Calderon	Ian	Dem	Yes	Fail
51	Carrillo	Wendy	Dem	Yes	Fail
60	Cervantes	Sabrina	Dem	Abstain	Fail
49	Chau	Ed	Dem	Yes	Fail
55	Chen	Phillip	Rep	Abstain	Fail
17	Chiu	David	Dem	Abstain	Pass
68	Choi	Steven	Rep	Abstain	Fail
25	Chu	Kansen	Dem	Yes	Pass
08	Cooley	Ken	Dem	No	Fail
09	Cooper	Jim	Dem	Yes	Pass
35	Cunningham	Jordan	Rep	Abstain	Fail
01	Dahle	Megan	Rep	Yes	Fail
69	Daly	Tom	Dem	Yes	Pass
72	Diep	Tyler	Rep	Absent	Fail
13	Eggman	Susan	Dem	Yes	Pass
12	Flora	Heath	Rep	Yes	Fail
34	Fong	Vince	Rep	No	Fail
11	Frazier	Jim	Dem	Absent	Pass
43	Friedman	Laura	Dem	Yes	Fail
45	Gabriel	Jesse	Dem	Yes	Fail
03	Gallagher	James	Rep	Yes	Fail
58	Garcia	Cristina	Dem	Yes	Pass
56	Garcia	Eduardo	Dem	Yes	Pass
64	Gipson	Mike	Dem	Yes	Pass
78	Gloria	Todd	Dem	Yes	Pass
80	Gonzalez	Lorena	Dem	Absent	Pass
21	Gray	Adam	Dem	Yes	Pass
14	Grayson	Tim	Dem	Yes	Pass
41	Holden	Chris	Dem	Yes	Fail
44	Irwin	Jacqui	Dem	Yes	Pass
59	Jones-Sawyer	Reggie	Dem	Yes	Pass
27	Kalra	Ash	Dem	Yes	Pass
54	Kamlager-Dove	Sydney	Dem	Yes	Pass
06	Kiley	Kevin	Rep	No	Fail
36	Lackey	Tom	Rep	Yes	Fail
10	Levine	Marc	Dem	No	Pass
37	Limón	Monique	Dem	Yes	Fail
28	Low	Evan	Dem	Yes	Pass
77	Maienschein	Brian	Dem	Yes	Pass
26	Mathis	Devon	Rep	Yes	Fail
42	Mayes	Chad	Ind	Yes	Fail
07	McCarty	Kevin	Dem	Yes	Pass
61	Medina	Jose	Dem	Yes	Pass
22	Mullin	Kevin	Dem	Yes	Pass
66	Muratsuchi	Al	Dem	Yes	Fail
46	Nazarian	Adrin	Dem	Abstain	Pass
70	O'Donnell	Patrick	Dem	Yes	Fail
33	Obernolte	Jay	Rep	Yes	Fail
23	Patterson	Jim	Rep	Abstain	Fail
74	Petrie-Norris	Cottie	Dem	Abstain	Fail
20	Quirk	Bill	Dem	Yes	Pass
65	Quirk-Silva	Sharon	Dem	Abstain	Fail
40	Ramos	James	Dem	Absent	Pass
63	Rendon	Anthony	Dem	Yes	Pass
47	Reyes	Eloise	Dem	Yes	Pass
39	Rivas	Luz	Dem	Yes	Pass
30	Rivas	Robert	Dem	Yes	Pass
52	Rodriguez	Freddie	Dem	Yes	Pass
48	Rubio	Blanca	Dem	Yes	Fail
32	Salas	Rudy	Dem	Abstain	Fail
53	Santiago	Miguel	Dem	Yes	Pass
38	Smith	Christy	Dem	Yes	Fail
29	Stone	Mark	Dem	Yes	Pass
19	Ting	Phil	Dem	Abstain	Pass
67	Vacant	Vacant	Vac	Vacant	Fail
71	Voepel	Randy	Rep	Yes	Fail
75	Waldron	Marie	Rep	Yes	Fail
79	Weber	Shirley	Dem	Yes	Pass
15	Wicks	Buffy	Dem	Yes	Pass
02	Wood	Jim	Dem	Abstain	Pass

===== California Senate =====
Senate votes are from the California Senate Daily Journal and Proposition 19 outcomes are from the California Secretary of State. The vote designation of "Abstain" is for those Legislators present on the day of the vote, but who did not record a vote for or against ACA 11. Senate districts are based on the applicable 2011 district.

District	Last Name	First Name	Party	ACA 11 Vote	Prop 19 Outcome
26	Allen	Ben	Dem	Abstain	Fail
32	Archuleta	Bob	Dem	Yes	Fail
39	Atkins	Toni	Dem	Yes	Pass
36	Bates	Patricia	Rep	No	Fail
15	Beall	Jim	Dem	Yes	Pass
08	Borgeas	Andreas	Rep	Abstain	Fail
35	Bradford	Steven	Dem	Yes	Pass
12	Caballero	Anna	Dem	Yes	Pass
29	Chang	Ling Ling	Rep	Abstain	Fail
01	Dahl	Brian	Rep	Yes	Fail
03	Dodd	Bill	Dem	Yes	Pass
24	Durazo	Maria Elena	Dem	Yes	Pass
05	Galgiani	Cathleen	Dem	Yes	Pass
07	Glazer	Steve	Dem	Yes	Pass
33	Gonzalez	Lena	Dem	Yes	Pass
16	Grove	Shannon	Rep	Abstain	Fail
18	Hertzberg	Robert	Dem	Yes	Pass
13	Hill	Jerry	Dem	Yes	Pass
40	Hueso	Ben	Dem	Yes	Pass
14	Hurtado	Melissa	Dem	Abstain	Pass
19	Jackson	Hannah-Beth	Dem	Yes	Fail
38	Jones	Brian	Rep	No	Fail
20	Leyva	Connie	Dem	Yes	Pass
02	McGuire	Mike	Dem	Yes	Pass
28	Melendez	Melissa	Rep	No	Fail
30	Mitchell	Holly	Dem	Yes	Pass
17	Monning	Bill	Dem	Yes	Pass
37	Moorlach	John	Rep	Abstain	Fail
23	Morrell	Mike	Rep	No	Fail
04	Nielsen	Jim	Rep	No	Fail
06	Pan	Richard	Dem	Yes	Pass
25	Portantino	Anthony	Dem	Yes	Fail
31	Roth	Richard	Dem	Yes	Pass
22	Rubio	Susan	Dem	Yes	Fail
09	Skinner	Nancy	Dem	Yes	Pass
27	Stern	Henry	Dem	Yes	Fail
34	Umberg	Tom	Dem	Yes	Fail
10	Wieckowski	Bob	Dem	Yes	Pass
11	Wiener	Scott	Dem	Yes	Pass
21	Wilk	Scott	Rep	Yes	Fail

== Real estate industry sponsor and prior history ==
The California Association of Realtors sponsored the Proposition 19 constitutional amendment, with the expectation of deriving significant profits from many more home sales under the ballot measure, including from both the expanded tax benefit portability provisions and from the significant narrowing of the inheritance exclusion provisions which will force more home sales. The president of the California Association of Realtors has denied that Proposition 19 is about making money for the Realtors.

== Racial equity issues ==
In analyzing the Proposition 19 ballot measure, a September 2020 report by the California Budget & Policy Center stated that: "Housing policy and tax policy have historically benefited white households most, including through policies with explicitly racist design and implementation that have blocked Black and brown Californians from homeownership opportunities. By directing additional tax benefits largely to white homeowners, Prop. 19 reinforces racial inequity within California's tax system."

The Greenlining Institute has also criticized Proposition 19 for not helping "first-time homeowners who are disproportionately Black, Indigenous and people of color."

== Campaign controversy ==
It was reported that the California Association of Realtors, the sponsor of Proposition 19, hired a former employee of a statewide taxpayer association, David Wolfe, for the sole purpose of using the former employer's job title to confuse voters to support Proposition 19. A radio ad was cited in the article as being deceptive because the former employee led listeners to believe he was advocating for the Proposition 19 tax increase in his capacity as the former legislative director of the statewide taxpayers association. The statewide taxpayers association received many calls from voters who said they were disgusted by the misleading radio ads and large direct mail pieces by the Yes on 19 campaign. The reporting article also cited a California Globe analysis that Proposition 19 is a billion dollar tax increase on California families and that Proposition 19 was in fact opposed by the statewide taxpayers association.

== Newspaper editorials ==
According to the California Initiative Editorial Scorecard, Proposition 19 was opposed by 16 major California newspapers and supported by 5 major California newspapers.

The following major California newspapers opposed Proposition 19:

Newspaper	Position
Los Angeles Times	Oppose
San Jose Mercury News	Oppose
Orange County Register	Oppose
East Bay Times	Oppose
San Francisco Chronicle	Oppose
The Press-Enterprise	Oppose
San Gabriel Valley Tribune	Oppose
The Daily Breeze	Oppose
Los Angeles Daily News	Oppose
The Santa Rosa Press Democrat	Oppose
Long Beach Press-Telegram	Oppose
Inland Valley Daily Bulletin	Oppose
San Bernardino Sun	Oppose
The Desert Sun	Oppose
Chico Enterprise-Record	Oppose
Bakersfield Californian	Oppose

The following major California newspaper supported Proposition 19:

Newspaper	Position
San Diego Union-Tribune	Support
Sacramento Bee	Support
San Luis Obispo Tribune	Support
Fresno Bee	Support
Modesto Bee	Support

== Campaign contributions ==
According to campaign contribution data from the California Secretary of State, as of November 1, 2020, supporters of Proposition 19 raised $47.0 million, with $40.4 million from the California Association of Realtors and $4.9 million from the National Association of Realtors, for a combined total of $45.3 million (96.4% of all campaign contributions) coming from real estate interests. Opponents of Proposition 19 raised approximately $45,000.

== Polling ==
In order to pass, Proposition 19 needed simple majority (>50%) approval by the voters which it narrowly received.

Poll source	Date(s) administered	Sample size (Note: Key: A – all adults RV – registered voters LV – likely voters V – unclear)	Margin of error	For Proposition 19	Against Proposition 19	Undecided
SurveyUSA	September 26–28, 2020	588 (LV)	± 5.4%	56%	10%	34%
