= 2020 California Proposition 17 =

U.S. state voting rights ballot measure

Proposition 17
- November 3, 2020
- Restores Right to Vote After Completion of Prison Term

Results
| Choice | Votes | % |
|---|---|---|
| Yes | 9,985,568 | 58.55% |
| No | 7,069,173 | 41.45% |
| Valid votes | 17,054,741 | 95.89% |
| Invalid or blank votes | 730,410 | 4.11% |
| Total votes | 17,785,151 | 100.00% |
| Registered voters/turnout | 22,047,448 | 80.67% |
County results
For
70%–80%
60%–70%
50%–60%
Against
70%–80%
60%–70%
50%–60%

The 2020 California Proposition 17 is a ballot measure that appeared on the ballot in the November 3, 2020 California election. Proposition 17 amended the Constitution of California to allow people who are on parole to vote, expanding the right to vote and run for public office to more than 50,000 disenfranchised Californians. California voters approved this measured by a margin of roughly 18 percentage points.

== Background ==
Appearing on ballot in the 2020 California elections on November 3, 2020, the proposed state constitutional amendment was originally introduced as California Assembly Constitutional Amendment No. 6 (ACA 6) by Assemblymember Kevin McCarty in January 2019. ACA 6 passed the California State Assembly by a vote of 54-19 on September 5, 2019, and was approved by the California State Senate by a vote of 28-9 on June 24, 2020. After being put on the ballot, ACA 6 was given the ballot designation of Proposition 17.

Under California law, there is a distinction between probation and parole. Probation is the part of the criminal sentence, and allows those with felonies to finish their sentence outside of the prison. Parole begins upon release from prison when their sentence ends. As of July 2020, the Constitution of California allows someone on probation to vote, but prohibits people on parole from voting until their parole is completed. The effect of Proposition 17 is that all individuals on probation or parole are allowed to vote.

=== Voting rights in other states ===
| States where people do not lose their right to vote (even if they are incarcerated). | Maine, Vermont |
| States where people's voting rights are lost while incarcerated, but restored after release (able to vote if they are on parole). | Colorado, Hawaii, Illinois, Indiana, Maryland, Massachusetts, Michigan, Montana, Nevada, New Jersey, New Hampshire, North Dakota, Ohio, Oregon, Pennsylvania, Rhode Island, Utah |
| States where people's voting rights are restored after they complete their sentence (including parole and/or probation and pay any fees/fines). | Alaska, Arkansas, California, Connecticut, Georgia, Idaho, Kansas, Louisiana, Minnesota, Missouri, New Mexico, New York, North Carolina, Oklahoma, South Carolina, South Dakota, Texas, Washington, West Virginia, Wisconsin |
| States where people's voting rights are lost indefinitely for specific offenses and can require a waiting period after their sentence is completed and/or a Governor's pardon. | Alabama, Arizona, Delaware, Florida, Iowa, Kentucky, Mississippi, Nebraska, Tennessee, Virginia, Wyoming |

== Support ==
ACA 6 was co-sponsored by #Cut50, All of Us or None, American Civil Liberties Union of California, Anti-Recidivism Coalition, Californians United for a Responsible Budget, Initiate Justice, League of Women Voters of California, Legal Services for Prisoners with Children, People Over Profits San Diego, Secretary of State Alex Padilla, Vote Allies, White People 4 Black Lives. It was also supported by 118 organizations and local governments. The official Argument in Favor was submitted by Carol Moon Goldberg, President of the League of Women Voters of California, Jay Jordan, executive director of Californians for Public Safety, and Assemblymember Kevin McCarty.

=== Political endorsements ===
- Alice B. Toklas LGBTQ Democratic Club
- Beverly Hill Democratic Club
- Black Women Organizing for Political Action
- California Democratic Party
- California Young Democrats
- Clairemont Democratic Club
- Democratic Socialists of America - Los Angeles
- Democratic Socialists of America - Orange County
- Democratic Socialists of America - San Diego
- Democratic Socialists of America - Santa Cruz
- Democratic Socialists of America - Silicon Valley
- East Bay Young Democrats
- Green Party of California
- Harvey Milk LGBTQ Democratic Club
- Libertarian Party of California
- Los Angeles County Democratic Party
- Peace and Freedom Party
- Pilipino American Los Angeles Democrats
- Richmond Progressive Alliance
- Sacramento County Democratic Party
- San Diego Democrats for Equality
- San Francisco Eastern Neighborhoods Democratic Club
- San Francisco Green Party
- San Francisco Women's Political Committee
- San Mateo County Democratic Party
- Santa Barbara County Democratic Party
- Santa Clara County Libertarian Party
- Silicon Valley Stonewall Democrats
- United Democratic Club
- Valley Grassroots for Democracy
- Ventura County Democratic Party
- West Hollywood Democratic Club

=== Union endorsements ===
- AFSCME California
- California Federation of Teachers
- California Labor Federation
- SEIU California State Council
- SEIU-UHW West

=== Newspaper editorials ===
Newspaper Editorials that Support Prop 17
| Newspaper Editorial | Position |
|---|---|
| La Times Newspaper | Support |
| Orange County Register | Support |
| Palo Alto Online | Support |
| San Diego Union-Tribune | Support |
| Mercury News | Support |
| Redlands Community News | Support |
| San Francisco Chronicle | Support |
| Santa Cruz Sentinel | Support |
| The Sacramento Bee | Support |

== Opposition ==
ACA 6 was opposed by Election Integrity Project California, Inc. The official Argument Against was submitted by Harriet Salarno, Founder of Crime Victims United of California, Jim Nielsen, retired Chairman of the California Board of Prison Terms, and Ruth Weiss, Vice President of the Election Integrity Project California.

=== Newspaper editorials ===
Newspaper Editorials That Oppose Prop 17
| Newspaper Editorial | Position |
|---|---|
| San Mateo Daily Journal | Oppose |
| Bakersfield California Editorial Board | Oppose |
| The Desert Sun Editorial Board | Oppose |

== Polling ==
In order to pass, it needs a simple majority (>50%).

| Poll source | Date(s) administered | Sample size (Note: Key: A – all adults RV – registered voters LV – likely voters V – unclear) | Margin of error | For Proposition 17 | Against Proposition 17 | Undecided |
|---|---|---|---|---|---|---|
| SurveyUSA | September 26–28, 2020 | 588 (LV) | ± 5.4% | 55% | 19% | 26% |

== Results ==
Proposition 17
| Choice | Votes | % |
|---|---|---|
| For | 9,985,568 | 58.55 |
| Against | 7,069,173 | 41.45 |
| Total | 17,054,741 | 100.00 |
| Valid votes | 17,054,741 | 95.89 |
| Invalid/blank votes | 730,410 | 4.11 |
| Total votes | 17,785,151 | 100.00 |
| Registered voters/turnout | 22,047,448 | 80.67 |
Source: Statement of Vote at the Wayback Machine (archived October 3, 2025)

Proposition 17 results (excluding invalid votes)
| Yes; 9,985,568 (58.6%) | No; 7,069,173 (41.4%) |
▲50%
