= 2022 United States ballot measures =

- May 7 to December 10, 2022

Part of the 2022 United States elections

The following is a list of ballot measures (also known as referendums, ballot questions, proposals, initiatives, propositions and proposals) which were on the ballot for the 2022 United States elections. Some were held prior to the federal elections on November 8. Many were initiated by state legislatures, while others were initiated by public petitions. In all, there were 141 ballot measures on ballots across most U.S. states and the District of Columbia at any point throughout the year.

There were no statewide ballot measures in 2022 for the states of Connecticut, Delaware, Hawaii, Indiana, Maine, Minnesota, Mississippi, New Jersey, North Carolina, Oklahoma, Pennsylvania, Virginia, and Wisconsin.

== Alabama ==
Alabama May 2022 ballot measure
| Measure | Type | Description | Result | Reference |
|---|---|---|---|---|
| Amendment 1 | Legislatively-referred constitutional amendment | Authorize $85 Million in Bonds for Public Historical Sites and State Parks Amendment: Sale and issuance of $85 million in bonds for improving, renovating, acquiring, constructing and maintenance of state parks and historical sites. | Passed | |

Alabama November 2022 ballot measure
| Measure | Type | Description | Result | Reference |
|---|---|---|---|---|
| Alabama Question | Legislatively-referred constitutional amendment | Alabama Recompiled Constitution Ratification Question: Ratify the Constitution of Alabama of 2022 that was updated and recompiled.; Remove racist language.; Update or remove outdated language.; Remove duplicate or repealed provisions.; Arrange local amendments by county of application. | Passed | |
| Amendment 1 | Legislatively-referred constitutional amendment | Allow Denial of Bail for Offenses Enumerated by State Legislature Amendment: Authorize the Legislature to deny bail for certain state law offenses (including murder, kidnapping, rape, and assault). | Passed | |
| Amendment 2 | Legislatively-referred constitutional amendment | Broadband Internet Infrastructure Funding Amendment: Allow state and local governments to fund the provision or expansion of broadband infrastructure from the private or public sectors. | Passed | |
| Amendment 3 | Legislatively-referred constitutional amendment | Notice to Victim's Family Required for Commutation or Reprieve of Death Sentences Amendment: Requires the Governor to notify the Attorney General and the victim's family before commuting or reprieving the death sentence of a person. | Passed | |
| Amendment 4 | Legislatively-referred constitutional amendment | Prohibit Changes to Election Conduct Laws within Six Months of General Elections Amendment: Require any legislation that changes the conduct of a general election to be implemented at least six months before a general election. | Passed | |
| Amendment 5 | Legislatively-referred constitutional amendment | Remove Orphans' Business from Probate Court Jurisdiction Amendment: Remove orphans' businesses from the jurisdiction of county probate courts. | Passed | |
| Amendment 6 | Legislatively-referred constitutional amendment | Authorize Certain Cities to Use Special Property Tax Revenue to Pay for Capital Improvements Directly Amendment: Allow certain cities to pass a special property tax to pay for capital improvements directly, instead of through paying through bonds or other forms of debt. | Passed | |
| Amendment 7 | Legislatively-referred constitutional amendment | Local Economic and Industrial Development Bonds and Financing Amendment: Change the requirement for local governments to pay for economic and industrial development. | Passed | |
| Amendment 8 | Legislatively-referred constitutional amendment | Public Service Commission to Regulate Private Sewer Systems in Shelby County Amendment: Provide that the State Public Service Commission to regulate privately-owned sewer systems and plants in Shelby County, Alabama, including the charges and rates. | Passed | |
| Amendment 9 | Legislatively-referred constitutional amendment | Public Service Commission to Regulate Private Sewer System in Lake View Amendment: Provide that the State Public Service Commission to regulate privately-owned sewer systems and plants in Lake View, Alabama from 2023 to 2027. | Passed | |
| Amendment 10 | Legislatively-referred constitutional amendment | Incorporate Voter-Approved Amendments in New State Constitution Measure: Authorize the Code Commissioner to incorporate voter-approved constitutional amendments at the May and November elections of 2022. | Passed | |

== Alaska ==
Alaska November 2022 ballot measure
| Measure | Type | Description | Result | Reference |
|---|---|---|---|---|
| Ballot Measure 1 | Automatic ballot referral | Constitutional Convention Question: Hold a state constitutional convention | Failed | |

== Arizona ==
Arizona November 2022 ballot propositions
| Measure | Type | Description | Result | Reference |
|---|---|---|---|---|
| Proposition 128 | Legislatively-referred constitutional amendment | Legislative Changes to Ballot Initiatives with Invalid Provisions Amendment: Allow the Legislature to amend or repeal voter-approved ballot initiatives if it has portions that has been declared unconstitutional by the Arizona Supreme Court or U.S. Supreme Court. | Failed | |
| Proposition 129 | Legislatively-referred constitutional amendment | Single-Subject Requirement for Ballot Initiatives Amendment: Limits citizen-initiated ballot measures to a single subject. | Passed | |
| Proposition 130 | Legislatively-referred constitutional amendment | Arizona Property Tax Exemptions Amendment: Allows the Legislature to determine property tax exemptions. | Passed | |
| Proposition 131 | Legislatively-referred constitutional amendment | Create Office of Lieutenant Governor Amendment: Creates a new office of Lieutenant Governor, which is to be elected on a joint ticket with the Governor. | Passed | |
| Proposition 132 | Legislatively-referred constitutional amendment | 60% Vote Requirement for Ballot Measures to Approve Taxes Amendment: Require at least 60% of the vote for ballot measures concerning taxes to be approved. | Passed | |
| Proposition 209 | Citizen-initiated state statute | Healthcare Debt Interest Rate Limit and Debt Collection Exemptions Initiative: Limit interest rates for medical debt.; Increase amount of property exempt from debt collection. | Passed | |
| Proposition 211 | Citizen-initiated state statute | Campaign Finance Sources Disclosure Initiative: Sets new limits on campaign finance.; Require additional campaign finance disclosure. | Passed | |
| Proposition 308 | Legislatively-referred state statute | In-State Tuition for Non-Citizen Residents Measure: Repeal provisions of Proposition 300 (2006) that banned in-state tuition for non-citizen high school students in Arizona. | Passed | |
| Proposition 309 | Legislatively-referred state statute | Voter Identification Requirements for Mail-In Ballots and In-Person Voting Measure: Require date-of-birth and voter identification when voting by mail.; Require photo identification for in-person voting. | Failed | |
| Proposition 310 | Legislatively-referred state statute | Sales Tax for Fire District Funding Measure: Impose a 0.1% sales tax for 20 years to fund Fire Districts. | Failed | |

== Arkansas ==
Arkansas November 2022 ballot propositions
| Measure | Type | Description | Result | Reference |
|---|---|---|---|---|
| Issue 1 | Legislatively-referred constitutional amendment | Legislative Authority to Call a Special Session Amendment: Allows the Legislature to convene in an extraordinary session upon either: A joint proclamation from the Speaker of the House and the Senate President Pro Tempore.; A proclamation signed by two-thirds of the members in both chambers of the Legislature. | Failed | |
| Issue 2 | Legislatively-referred constitutional amendment | 60% Supermajority Vote Requirement for Constitutional Amendments and Ballot Initiatives Measure: Require a 60% supermajority vote of approval for the adoption of citizen-initiated constitutional amendments and state statutes. | Failed | |
| Issue 3 | Legislatively-referred constitutional amendment | Government Burden of Free Exercise of Religion Amendment: Provide that the State Government "shall not burden a person's freedom of religion even if the burden results from a rule of general applicability". | Failed | |
| Issue 4 | Ballot initiative constitutional amendment | Marijuana Legalization Initiative: Legalize the possession and use of up to one ounce of marijuana for persons who are at least 21 years old; Enact a 10% tax on marijuana sales; Require the state Alcoholic Beverage Control Division to regulate marijuana businesses. | Failed | |

== California ==
California November 2022 propositions
| Proposition | Type | Description | Result | Reference |
|---|---|---|---|---|
| Proposition 1 | Legislatively-referred constitutional amendment | Right to Reproductive Freedom Amendment: Prohibit the state government from denying or interfering with an individual's reproductive freedom, including their fundamental right to choose to have an abortion and their fundamental right to choose or refuse the use of contraceptives. | Passed | |
| Proposition 26 | Legislatively-referred constitutional amendment and state statute | Legalize Sports Betting on American Indian Lands Initiative: Legalize sports betting at Native American casinos and licensed racetracks in California.; Legalize roulette and dice games at Native American casinos. The games can be offered after tribal-state compacts have been amended appropriately.; Impose a 10 percent tax on sports betting at racetracks, with the revenue generated being used to enforce and implement problem-gambling prevention programs. | Failed | |
| Proposition 27 | Legislatively-referred constitutional amendment and state statute | Legalize Sports Betting and Revenue for Homelessness Prevention Fund Initiative: Legalize online and mobile sports betting platforms that are associated with an existing gaming tribe.; Online sports betting platforms would be operated by a gaming tribe directly or with an operating agreement with a gaming tribe.; A 10 percent tax would also be levied on sports betting revenues and licensing fees, with the revenue generated to both regulate the online sports betting industry and help homelessness prevention programs. | Failed | |
| Proposition 28 | Citizen-initiated state statute | Art and Music K-12 Education Funding Initiative: Require annual funding for arts and music education in all K-12 public schools. The annual minimum amount would be equal to 1 percent of the required state and local funding for public schools under 1988's Proposition 98. The funds would be distributed so that a greater proportion are given to schools that serve economically disadvantaged students.; Schools with 500 or more students would be required to: Spend 80 percent of the funding they receive to employ teachers.; The other 20 percent for training and supplies. | Passed | |
| Proposition 29 | Citizen-initiated state statute | Dialysis Clinic Requirements Initiative: Require kidney dialysis clinics to: Have at least one physician, nurse practitioner, or physician assistant, with at six months' relevant experience, on site during a patient's treatment.; Report daily dialysis-related infection data to the California Department of Public Health; Disclose to patients a list of physicians with at least 5 percent ownership in the clinic.; Not discriminate against patients based on their source of payment. | Failed | |
| Proposition 30 | Citizen-initiated state statute | Tax on Income Above $2 Million for Zero-Emissions Vehicles and Wildfire Prevention Initiative: Increase the personal income tax for those making over $2 million by 1.75 percent.; The additional revenue would be used to fund zero-emission vehicle subsidies and infrastructure, and wildfire suppression and prevention programs. | Failed | |
| Proposition 31 | Veto referendum on state statute | Referendum Challenging a 2020 Law Prohibiting Retail Sale Of Certain Flavored Tobacco Products: Uphold Senate Bill 793 (SB 793) passed by the state legislature in 2020.; Ban the sale of flavored tobacco products and tobacco product flavor enhancers.; Fine retailers $250 for each sale that breaks this law. | Passed | |

== Colorado ==
Colorado November 2022 ballot propositions
| Measure | Type | Description | Result | Reference |
|---|---|---|---|---|
| Amendment D | Legislatively-referred constitutional amendment | Designate Judges to Twenty-Third Judicial District Measure: Require the Governor to designate judges from the 18th Judicial District to serve in the new 23rd Judicial District by November 30, 2024; Require these new judges to establish residence in the new 23rd Judicial District by January 7, 2025. | Passed | |
| Amendment E | Legislatively-referred constitutional amendment | Homestead Exemption to Surviving Spouses of U.S. Armed Forces Members and Veterans Measure: Extend an existing primary residence property tax exemption to seniors, disabled veterans and surviving spouses of veterans who have died. | Passed | |
| Amendment F | Legislatively-referred constitutional amendment | Charitable Gaming Measure: Repeal the ban on paying managers and operators of charitable gaming activities. Limit the compensation amounts to the minimum wage until July 1, 2024.; Reduce the time an organization that must exist before obtaining a charitable gaming license through January 1, 2025 from 5 years to 3 years.; Allow the Legislature to determine how long an organization must exist before obtaining a charitable gaming license after January 1, 2025. | Failed | |
| Proposition 121 | Citizen-initiated state statute | State Income Tax Rate Reduction Initiative: Decrease the state income tax rate from 4.55% to 4.40% for tax years commencing on or after January 1, 2022. | Passed | |
| Proposition 122 | Citizen-initiated state statute | Decriminalization and Regulated Access Program for Certain Psychedelic Plants and Fungi Initiative: Define certain psychedelic plants and fungi as natural medicine. (Includes dimethyltryptamine (DMT), ibogaine, mescaline (excluding peyote), psilocybin and psilocyn.; Decriminalize personal use, possession, growth and transport of natural medicines for persons aged 21 years old and above.; Create the Regulated Natural Medicine Access Program for licensed healing centers to administer natural medicine | Passed | |
| Proposition 123 | Citizen-initiated state statute | Dedicate State Income Tax Revenue to Fund Housing Projects Initiative: The creation of the State Affordable Housing Fund, which would use one-tenth of one percent (0.1%) of state income tax revenue to fund affordable housing programs, including: Provide grants to local governments and loans to nonprofit organizations to buy and maintain land to develop affordable housing.; Create an affordable housing equity program to ensure rent in multi-family rental units is no higher than 30% of a household's income.; Create a concessionary debt program to finance the development of low- and middle-income multi-family rental units and existing affordable housing projects.; Create an affordable home ownership program that provides down-payment assistance for homebuyers that meet the income requirements.; Create a grant program for local governments to increase capacity to process land use, permitting, and zoning applications for housing development projects.; Create a program to provide rental assistance and housing vouchers for homeless people. | Passed | |
| Proposition 124 | Citizen-initiated state statute | Retail Liquor Store Licenses Initiative: Increase the number of retail liquor licenses an individual may own or hold a share in: Up to 8 licenses by December 31, 2026.; Up to 13 licenses by December 31, 2031.; Up to 20 licenses by December 31, 2036.; An unlimited number of licenses on or after January 1, 2037. | Failed | |
| Proposition 125 | Citizen-initiated state statute | Wine Sales in Grocery and Convenience Stores Initiative: Allows grocery stores, convenience stores and other businesses that sell beer to also sell wine for off-site consumption. | Passed | |
| Proposition 126 | Citizen-initiated state statute | Alcohol Delivery Service Initiative: Allow retail establishments to offer delivery services (including third-party) of alcohol.; Allow bars and restaurants to offer takeout and delivery of alcohol. | Failed | |
| Proposition FF | Legislatively-referred state statute | Reduce Income Tax Deduction Amounts to Fund School Meals Program Measure: Reduce income tax deductions.; Use revenue generated to create and fund the Healthy School Meals for All Program to pay schools to provide free meals to students. | Passed | |
| Proposition GG | Legislatively-referred state statute | Table of Changes to Income Tax Owed Required for Citizen Initiatives Measure: Require ballot initiatives that affect income taxes to include information on how the change would impact income tax for people of different income. | Passed | |

== Florida ==
Florida November 2022 ballot propositions
| Measure | Type | Description | Result | Reference |
|---|---|---|---|---|
| Amendment 1 | Legislatively-referred constitutional amendment | Disregard Flood Resistance Improvements in Property Value Assessments Measure: Prohibit flood resistance improvements to a home from being accounted in a property's assessed value. | Failed | |
| Amendment 2 | Legislatively-referred constitutional amendment | Abolish the Constitution Revision Commission Measure: Abolish the Florida Constitution Revision Commission, that meets every 20 years to propose changes to the state constitution. | Failed | |
| Amendment 3 | Legislatively-referred constitutional amendment | Additional Homestead Property Tax Exemption for Certain Public Service Workers Amendment: Provide an additional homestead tax exemption on property owned by certain public service workers. (Includes teachers, law enforcement officers, emergency medical personnel, military personnel, Florida National Guard and child welfare service employees.) | Failed | |

== Georgia ==
Georgia November 2022 ballot propositions
| Measure | Type | Description | Result | Reference |
|---|---|---|---|---|
| Amendment 1 | Legislatively-referred constitutional amendment | Suspend Compensation for Assembly Members and Public Officials Indicted for a Felony Measure: Suspend compensation for public officials while the individual is suspended from office due to an indictment for a felony. | Passed | |
| Amendment 2 | Legislatively-referred constitutional amendment | Temporary Property Tax Change for Disaster Areas Measure: Allow local governments to give tax relief to property damaged by a disaster and located within a declared disaster zone. | Passed | |
| Referendum A | Legislatively-referred statute | Timber Equipment Exempt from Property Taxes Measure: Exempt certain timber equipment owned by a timber producer from property taxes. | Passed | |
| Referendum B | Legislatively-referred statute | Merged Family-Owned Farms and Dairy and Eggs Tax Exemption Measure: Expand agricultural equipment tax exemption and produce to include those owned by merged family farms. | Passed | |

== Idaho ==
Idaho November 2022 ballot propositions
| Measure | Type | Description | Result | Reference |
|---|---|---|---|---|
| Advisory Ballot | Legislatively-referred constitutional amendment | Income and Corporate Tax Changes and Education Funding Question: Enact a flat 5.8% income and corporate tax rate.; Tax rebates to qualifying taxpayers.; $410 million of revenue from sales tax to fund education and in-demand job funds. | Passed | |
| Constitutional Amendment SJR 102 | Legislatively-referred constitutional amendment | Legislative Authority to Call a Special Session Amendment: Allow the Senate President and House Speaker to call a special session if requested by over 60% of legislators in both houses.; Allow the Legislature to only consider the topics specified in the written request during the special legislative sessions.; Require a legislative session on the first Thursday of December after a general election. | Passed | |

== Illinois ==
Illinois November 2022 ballot propositions
| Measure | Type | Description | Result | Reference |
|---|---|---|---|---|
| Amendment 1 | Legislatively-referred constitutional amendment | Right to Collective Bargaining Measure: Guarantee workers the right to organize and the right to collective bargaining.; Prohibit any law that "interferes with, negates, or diminishes the right of employees to organize and bargain collectively." | Passed | |

== Iowa ==
Iowa November 2022 ballot propositions
| Measure | Type | Description | Result | Reference |
|---|---|---|---|---|
| Amendment 1 | Legislatively-referred constitutional amendment | Right to Keep and Bear Arms Amendment: Amends the Iowa constitution to include the right to own and bear arms.; Strict scrutiny for any alleged violations of the right. | Passed | |

== Kansas ==
Kansas August 2022 ballot measures
| Measure | Type | Description | Result | Reference |
|---|---|---|---|---|
| Kansas Value Them Both Amendment | Legislatively-referred constitutional amendment | Kansas No State Constitutional Right to Abortion and Legislative Power to Regulate Abortion Amendment: Changes state constitution to state that nothing in the state constitution creates a right to abortion or requires government funding for abortion. | Failed | |

Kansas November 2022 ballot measures
| Measure | Type | Description | Result | Reference |
|---|---|---|---|---|
| Amendment 1 | Legislatively-referred constitutional amendment | Legislative Veto or Suspension of Executive Agency Regulations Amendment: Authorizes the Legislature to veto or suspend rules or regulations adopted by executive agencies via a simple majority vote. | Failed | |
| Amendment 2 | Legislatively-referred constitutional amendment | County Sheriff Election and Recall Amendment: Requires the election of county sheriffs in counties that had not abolished the office and provide that sheriffs may be recalled from office. | Passed | |

== Kentucky ==
Kentucky November 2022 ballot measures
| Measure | Type | Description | Result | Reference |
|---|---|---|---|---|
| Amendment 1 | Legislatively-referred constitutional amendment | Changes to Legislative Session End Dates and Special Sessions Amendment: Require the Legislature to have a 60% supermajority to change the end date of the legislative session.; Permit the House Speaker and Senate President to call a special legislative session that lasts up to 12 days.; Laws that are passed come into effect on July 1 of the year that act was passed or after 90 days, whichever was later.; Remove legislative session end dates.; Limit legislative sessions in odd-numbered years to 30 days and in even-numbered years to 60 days. | Failed | |
| Amendment 2 | Legislatively-referred constitutional amendment | No Right to Abortion in Constitution Amendment: Change the state constitution to state that nothing in the state constitution creates a right to abortion or requires government funding for abortion. | Failed | |

== Louisiana ==
Louisiana November 2022 ballot measures
| Measure | Type | Description | Result | Reference |
|---|---|---|---|---|
| Amendment 1 | Legislatively-referred constitutional amendment | Increase Maximum Amount Invested in Equities for Certain State Funds Measure: Increase the portion of state funds that can be invested in stocks from 35% to 65%. | Failed | |
| Amendment 2 | Legislatively-referred constitutional amendment | Property Tax Exemptions for Certain Disabled Veterans and Spouses Measure: Expand property tax exemptions for veterans. | Passed | |
| Amendment 3 | Legislatively-referred constitutional amendment | Classified Civil Service Employee Public Support of Family Members' Campaigns Measure: Allow civil servants to support the election campaigns of their immediate family when they are off duty. | Failed | |
| Amendment 4 | Legislatively-referred constitutional amendment | Waiving Water Charges Measure: Waives water charges to customer if they were not caused by the actions or inactions of the customer. | Passed | |
| Amendment 5 | Legislatively-referred constitutional amendment | Adjustment of Ad Valorem Tax Rates Measure: Provide that property tax rates can be increased by a two-thirds vote by the taxing authority up to the maximum rate permitted by the Louisiana Constitution until the authorized rate expires. | Failed | |
| Amendment 6 | Legislatively-referred constitutional amendment | Limit on Assessed Value Increase of Reappraised Property in Orleans Parish Measure: Limit yearly increases of home assessment values in Orleans Parish to 10%. | Failed | |
| Amendment 7 | Legislatively-referred constitutional amendment | Remove Involuntary Servitude as Punishment for a Crime from Constitution Measure: Remove language in the Louisiana Constitution that permits slavery and involuntary servitude as a form of punishment.; Add language in the Louisiana Constitution that prohibits slavery and involuntary servitude except in circumstances of "otherwise lawful administration of criminal justice". | Failed | |
| Amendment 8 | Legislatively-referred constitutional amendment | Remove Special Assessment Property Tax Annual Income Recertification for Permanently Disabled Homeowners Measure: Remove annual income recertification as a requirement for property tax exemption for disabled homeowners. | Passed | |

Louisiana December 2022 ballot measures
| Measure | Type | Description | Result | Reference |
|---|---|---|---|---|
| Amendment 1 | Legislatively-referred constitutional amendment | Citizen Requirement for Voting Measure: Mandate that only United States citizens are allowed to register and vote in the state. | Passed | |
| Amendment 2 | Legislatively-referred constitutional amendment | Senate Confirmation for Appointees to State Civil Service Commission Measure: Require Senate confirmation for State Civil Service Commission appointees that are appointed by the Governor. | Passed | |
| Amendment 3 | Legislatively-referred constitutional amendment | Senate Confirmation for Appointees to State Police Commission Measure: Require Senate confirmation for State Police Commission appointees that are appointed by the Governor. | Passed | |

== Maryland ==
Maryland November 2022 ballot propositions
| Proposition | Type | Description | Result | Reference |
|---|---|---|---|---|
| Question 1 | Legislatively-referred constitutional amendment | Renaming of the Courts of Appeals and Special Appeals Amendment: Change the name of the Maryland Court of Appeals to the Supreme Court of Maryland.; Change the name of the Maryland Court of Special Appeals to the Appellate Court of Maryland. | Passed | |
| Question 2 | Legislatively-referred constitutional amendment | Residency Requirements for State Legislators Amendment: Require state legislative candidates to live in the district in which they are running for six months before their election, effective January 1, 2024.; Changes all gendered language in the amended section of the state constitution to gender-neutral language. | Passed | |
| Question 3 | Legislatively-referred constitutional amendment | Civil Jury Trials Amendment: Raise the state's jury trial threshold from $15,000 to $25,000. | Passed | |
| Question 4 | Legislatively-referred constitutional amendment | Marijuana Legalization Amendment: Legalizes and taxes cannabis for adult use, effective July 1, 2023. | Passed | |
| Question 5 | Legislatively-referred constitutional amendment | Requiring Howard County Circuit Court Judges to Serve on Orphan Court Amendment: Require Howard County Circuit Court judges to serve as orphans' court judges; Remove the election requirement of three orphans' court judges. | Passed | |

== Massachusetts ==
Massachusetts November 2022 proposals
| Measure | Type | Description | Result | Reference |
|---|---|---|---|---|
| Question 1 | Legislatively-referred constitutional amendment | Tax on Income Above $1 Million for Education and Transportation Amendment: A new 4% tax on incomes above $1 million, with the revenue generated to be spent on education and transportation. | Passed | |
| Question 2 | Citizen-initiated state statute | Medical Loss Ratios for Dental Insurance Plans Initiative: Enact a medical loss ratio of 83% for dental insurance plans. | Passed | |
| Question 3 | Citizen-initiated state statute | Changes to Alcohol Retail Licensing Initiative: Change the number of alcohol licenses an establishment could own.; Ban automated or self-checkout sales of alcohol.; Allow out-of-state driver's licenses as age identification. | Failed | |
| Question 4 | Veto referendum | Remove Proof of Citizenship or Immigration Status for Driver's License Applications Referendum: Maintain current law that allow people who cannot verify citizenship or immigration status to use alternate forms of identification when applying for a driver's license. | Passed | |

== Michigan ==
Michigan November 2022 proposals
| Proposals | Type | Description | Result | Reference |
|---|---|---|---|---|
| Proposal 1 | Legislatively-referred constitutional amendment | Legislative Term Limits and Financial Disclosure Amendment.: Change term limits in the Michigan state legislature. Currently, legislators are limited to serving three terms in the Michigan House of Representatives and two terms in the Michigan Senate. This proposal would modify the limit to be a lifetime twelve-year limit for service across both chambers.; Increase financial disclosure requirements for various elected officials. | Passed | |
| Proposal 2 | Citizen-initiated constitutional amendment | Right to Voting Policies Amendment: Change voting procedures in the state with the intent of making it easier for citizens to vote.; Create a nine day early voting period.; Require photo identification or the signing of an affidavit to vote.; Require voting ballots for the military or overseas postmarked on election day to be counted.; A right for voters to request an absentee ballot.; Require the state to fund dropboxes for absentee ballots.; Allow local governments to receive funding and donation from charity organizations to assist with running elections, as long as they are not foreign entities.; Provide that election officials are responsible for election audits.; Election audits to be conducted in public.; Election results to be certified on vote cast.; Prohibit harassing or intimidating conduct that interferes with or denies the right to vote. | Passed | |
| Proposal 3 | Citizen-initiated constitutional amendment | Right to Reproductive Freedom Initiative: Protect the right to make decisions on prenatal care, childbirth, postpartum care, contraception, sterilization, abortion care, miscarriage management, and infertility care. | Passed | |

== Missouri ==
Missouri November 2022 ballot measures
| Measure | Type | Description | Result | Reference |
|---|---|---|---|---|
| Amendment 1 | Legislatively-referred constitutional amendment | State Treasurer Investment Authority Amendment: Change how the State Treasurer of Missouri is allowed to invest taxpayer money.; Authorize the Legislature to pass laws allowing the State Treasurer to invest in "other reasonable and prudent financial instruments and securities. | Failed | |
| Amendment 3 | Citizen-initiated constitutional amendment | Marijuana Legalization Initiative: Legalize the possession, consumption, manufacture, sale and delivery of marijuana.; Allow for a petition of release from prison and expungement of conviction records for certain marijuana-related offenses, while also allowing judges to deny the expungement for "good cause".; 6% tax on the retail price of marijuana. | Passed | |
| Amendment 4 | legislatively-referred constitutional amendment | Allow Legislature to Require a City to Increase Funding without State Reimbursement for a Police Force Established by State Board Amendment: Allow the Legislature to increase the minimum funding of a police force that was established by the state board of police commissioners. | Passed | |
| Amendment 5 | legislatively-referred constitutional amendment | Department of the National Guard Amendment: Makes the Missouri National Guard its own department and renames it to the Missouri Department of the National Guard. | Passed | |
| Question | Automatic ballot referral | Missouri Constitutional Convention Question: Hold a state constitutional convention. | Failed | |

== Montana ==
Montana November 2022 ballot propositions
| Measure | Type | Description | Result | Reference |
|---|---|---|---|---|
| C-48 | Legislatively-referred constitutional amendment | Search Warrant for Electronic Data Amendment: Require a search warrant to access a person's electronic data or electronic communications. | Passed | |
| LR-131 | Legislatively-referred state statute | Medical Care Requirements for Born-Alive Infants Measure: Classify infants born alive after an attempted abortion as legal persons with the right to "appropriate and reasonable medical care and treatment".; Criminalize health care providers that do not save infants born alive after induced labor, C-section, attempted abortion or another method.; $50,000 fine and/or 20 years in prison as the maximum penalty. | Failed | |

== Nebraska ==
Nebraska November 2022 ballot propositions
| Measure | Type | Description | Result | Reference |
|---|---|---|---|---|
| Amendment 1 | Legislatively-referred constitutional amendment | Authorize Local Governments to Develop Commercial Air Travel Service Amendment: Allow local governments that operate an airport to use its revenue to develop or attract new or existing airline companies to that airport. | Passed | |
| Initiative 432 | Citizen-initiated constitutional amendment | Photo Voter Identification Initiative: Require photo identification in order to vote.; Valid identification to be specified by the State Legislature. | Passed | |
| Initiative 433 | Citizen-initiated constitutional amendment | Minimum Wage Increase Initiative: Raise the minimum wage of Nebraska to $9 per hour in 2023.; Incrementally raise the minimum wage yearly to $15 per hour by 2026. | Passed | |

== Nevada ==
Nevada November 2022 ballot propositions
| Measure | Type | Description | Result | Reference |
|---|---|---|---|---|
| Question 1 | Legislatively-referred constitutional amendment | Equal Rights Amendment: Amend the state constitution to prohibit discrimination based on an individual's race, color, creed, sex, sexual orientation, gender identity or expression, age, disability, ancestry or national origin | Passed | |
| Question 2 | Legislatively-referred constitutional amendment | Minimum Wage Amendment: Increase the minimum wage to $12.00 per hour by July 2024.; Allow the state legislature to raise the minimum wage above the mandated $12.00 per hour.; Eliminate existing annual inflation adjustments to the minimum wage.; Removal of the two-tiered system that allows employers to lower their employees' minimum wage by providing certain health benefits. | Passed | |
| Question 3 | Citizen-initiated constitutional amendment | Top-Five Ranked Choice Voting Initiative: Abolish partisan primaries for federal and state offices.; Have an open primary regardless of party affiliation. The top five candidates then advance to the general election.; Voters rank these five candidates in the general election. The candidate with more than 50% of votes is declared the winner.; This ballot measure will have to be approved again in the 2024 General Election for the Nevada Constitution to be successfully amended. | Passed | |

== New Hampshire ==
New Hampshire November 2022 ballot propositions
| Measure | Type | Description | Result | Reference |
|---|---|---|---|---|
| Question | Automatic ballot referral | New Hampshire Constitutional Convention Question (2022): The holding of a state constitutional convention. | Failed | |
| Question 1 | Legislatively-referred constitutional amendment | Abolish Office of Register of Probate Amendment: Eliminate the Office of Register of Probate and any references to it within the New Hampshire Constitution. | Failed | |

== New Mexico ==
New Mexico November 2022 propositions
| Measure | Type | Description | Result | Reference |
|---|---|---|---|---|
| Bond Question 1 | Bond issue | Senior Citizens Facilities Bond Issue: Sale and issuance of $24,470,000 in bonds for the improving of senior citizen facilities. | Passed | |
| Bond Question 2 | Bond issue | Public Libraries Bond Issue: Sale and issuance of $19,266,000 in bonds for the improving of public libraries. | Passed | |
| Bond Question 3 | Bond issue | Public Education Bond Issue: Sale and issuance of $215,986,000 in bonds for the improving of certain higher education, special public schools and tribal schools. | Passed | |
| Constitutional Amendment 1 | Legislatively-referred constitutional amendment | Funding for Early Childhood Programs Amendment: Allocate 1.25% of the five-year average of year-end market values of the money in the Land Grand Permanent Fund (LGPF) to early childhood education and the public school permanent fund if the LGPF balance of the previous year was not below $17 billion. | Passed | . |
| Constitutional Amendment 2 | Legislatively-referred constitutional amendment | Authorizing Funds for Residential Services Infrastructure Amendment: Allow appropriate state funds to provide access to essential residential services, including internet, electric, natural gas, water, and wastewater, through a simple majority vote in both chambers of the Legislature. | Passed | |
| Constitutional Amendment 3 | Legislatively-referred constitutional amendment | Appointed Judge Elections Amendment: Appointed judges will remain in office for at least a year before being up for retention election at the next general election. | Passed | |

== New York ==
New York November 2022 propositions
| Measure | Type | Description | Result | Reference |
|---|---|---|---|---|
| Proposal 1 | Legislatively-referred state statute | Environmental Bond Measure: Sale and issuance of $4.20 billion in state bonds for funding projects classified as environmental protection, natural restoration, resiliency, climate mitigation and clean energy. | Passed | |

== North Dakota ==
North Dakota November 2022 propositions
| Measure | Type | Description | Result | Reference |
|---|---|---|---|---|
| Constitutional Measure 1 | Citizen-initiated constitutional amendment | Term Limits for Governor and State Legislators Initiative: Limit the Governor to serving two four-year terms.; Limit state Senate and state House terms to eight years, separately. | Passed | |
| Statutory Measure 2 | Citizen-initiated state statute | Marijuana Legalization Initiative: Legalize the use and possession of up to one ounce of marijuana for adults aged 21 years and older.; Allow individuals to grow up to three marjiauna plants.; Require the state Department of Health and Human Services to regulate marijuana use by October 1, 2023. | Failed | |

== Ohio ==
Ohio November 2022 ballot propositions
| Measure | Type | Description | Result | Reference |
|---|---|---|---|---|
| Issue 1 | Legislatively-referred constitutional amendment | Determining Bail Amount Based on Public Safety Amendment: Require consideration of public safety in the setting of bail amounts.; Transfer responsibility for establishing bail procedures from the Ohio Supreme Court to the State Legislature. | Passed | |
| Issue 2 | Legislatively-referred constitutional amendment | Citizenship Voting Requirement Amendment: Prohibit local governments from allowing non-citizens or those who lack the qualifications of an elector to vote in local elections. | Passed | |

== Oregon ==
Oregon November 2022 ballot propositions
| Measure | Type | Description | Result | Reference |
|---|---|---|---|---|
| Measure 111 | Legislatively-referred constitutional amendment | Right to Healthcare Amendment: Amends the Oregon Constitution to ensure access to cost-effective and affordable health care is a fundamental right. | Passed | |
| Measure 112 | Legislatively-referred constitutional amendment | Remove Slavery as Punishment for Crime from Constitution Amendment: Removes language from the Oregon Constitution that permits slavery or involuntary servitude as a form of criminal punishment.; Adds language to the Oregon Constitution that authorizes courts or probation or parole agencies to have alternatives to incarceration for convicted individuals during sentencing. | Passed | |
| Measure 113 | Citizen-initiated constitutional amendment | Exclusion from Re-election for Legislative Absenteeism Initiative: Disqualify legislators for re-election after the end of their term if they have been absent from 10 floor sessions at the Legislature without permission or excuse. | Passed | |
| Measure 114 | Citizen-initiated state statute | Changes to Firearm Ownership and Purchase Requirements Initiative: Require permits from local law enforcement to buy a firearm.; Require photo identification, fingerprints, safety training, criminal background check and the payment of a fee to apply for a firearm permit.; Criminalize the manufacturing, importing, buying, selling, possessing, using or transferring of ammunition magazines that hold more than 10 rounds. Violations would make it a class A misdeameanor. | Passed | |

== Rhode Island ==
Rhode Island November 2022 ballot propositions
| Measure | Type | Description | Result | Reference |
|---|---|---|---|---|
| Question 1 | Bond Issue | University Narragansett Bay Campus Bond Measure: Sale and issuance of $100 million in bonds for funding the education and research of the marine discipline in the University of Rhode Island Narrangansett Campus. | Passed | |
| Question 2 | Bond Issue | Public School Buildings Bond Measure: Sale and issuance of $250 million in bonds for construction and renovation of state public school buildings. | Passed | |
| Question 3 | Bond Issue | Environment and Recreation Bond Measure: Sale and issuance of $50 million in bonds for environmental and recreational purposes. | Passed | |

== South Carolina ==
South Carolina November 2022 ballot propositions
| Measure | Type | Description | Result | Reference |
|---|---|---|---|---|
| Amendment 1 | Legislatively-referred constitutional amendment | General Reserve Fund Increase Measure: Increase the funds the General Reserve Fund receives from the state general fund revenue from 5% to 7% by increasing 0.5% each year. | Passed | |
| Amendment 2 | Legislatively-referred constitutional amendment | Capital Reserve Fund Increase Measure: Increase the funds the Capital Reserve Fund receives from the state general fund revenue from 2% to 3%.; Provide the first use of the Capital Reserve Fund to offset midyera budget reductions. | Passed | |

== South Dakota ==
South Dakota June 2022 ballot propositions
| Measure | Type | Description | Result | Reference |
|---|---|---|---|---|
| Constitutional Amendment C | Legislatively-referred constitutional amendment | 60% Vote Requirement for Ballot Measures Increasing Taxes or Appropriating $10 Million Amendment: Require a 60% supermajority vote for the approval of ballot measures that appropriate $10 million or more in the first five fiscal years. | Failed | |

South Dakota November 2022 ballot propositions
| Measure | Type | Description | Result | Reference |
|---|---|---|---|---|
| Constitutional Amendment D | Legislatively-referred constitutional amendment | Medicaid Expansion Initiative: Require the state to expand Medicaid coverage for adults between the age 18 and 65 with incomes 138% below the federal poverty level, beginning July 1, 2023. | Passed | |
| Initiated Measure 27 | Legislatively-referred state statute | Marijuana Legalization Initiative: Legalize the possession, distribution, and use of marijuana for person aged 21 years old and above. | Failed | |

== Tennessee ==
Tennessee November 2022 propositions
| Measure | Type | Description | Result | Reference |
|---|---|---|---|---|
| Amendment 1 | Legislatively-referred constitutional amendment | Right-to-Work Amendment: Make it illegal for employers to mandate labor union membership for employees as a condition for employment. | Passed | |
| Amendment 2 | Legislatively-referred constitutional amendment | Acting Governor Amendment: Provide a process and line of succession for an acting Governor when and if the governor can no longer perform the duties and powers of their office. | Passed | |
| Amendment 3 | Legislatively-referred constitutional amendment | Remove Slavery as Punishment for Crime from Constitution Amendment: Remove language from the Tennessee Constitution that allowed the use of slavery and involuntary servitude as criminal punishments, and replace it with "Slavery and involuntary servitude are forever prohibited.". | Passed | |
| Amendment 4 | Legislatively-referred constitutional amendment | Remove Religious Minister Disqualification Amendment: Remove a section of the Tennessee Constitution that disqualified religious ministers from being elected to the Tennessee General Assembly | Passed | |

== Texas ==
Texas May 2022 propositions
| Measure | Type | Description | Result | Reference |
|---|---|---|---|---|
| Proposition 1 | Legislatively-referred constitutional amendment | Property Tax Limit Reduction for Elderly and Disabled Residents Amendment: Allow the Legislature to lower property tax limits for school maintenance and operations taxes paid by elderly or disabled people. | Passed | |
| Proposition 2 | Legislatively-referred constitutional amendment | Increased Homestead Exemption for School District Property Taxes Amendment: Increase homestead exemption value for school district property taxes from $25,000 to $40,000. | Passed | |

== Utah ==
Utah November 2022 ballot proposition
| Measure | Type | Description | Result | Reference |
|---|---|---|---|---|
| Constitutional Amendment A | Legislatively-referred constitutional amendment | Emergency Session Appropriation Limits Measure: Increases the approprations limit of an emergency session the Legislature can hold from 1 percent to 5 percent of the previous fiscal year's budget.; Exempt emergency federal funding from this limit.; Exempt any appropriations that lowered total spending for the year from this limit. | Failed | |

== Vermont ==
Vermont November 2022 propositions
| Measure | Type | Description | Result | Reference |
|---|---|---|---|---|
| Proposal 2 | Legislatively-referred constitutional amendment | Prohibit Slavery and Indentured Servitude Amendment: Removes language in the State Constitution that allowed slavery or indentured servitude.; Ban slavery and indentured servitude in the State Constitution. | Passed | |
| Proposal 5 | Legislatively-referred constitutional amendment | Right to Personal Reproductive Autonomy Amendment: Protects the right to personal reproductive autonomy; Prohibit government infringement on personal reproductive autonomy unless there is a "compelling State interest". | Passed | |

== Washington ==
Washington November 2022 propositions
| Measure | Type | Description | Result | Reference |
|---|---|---|---|---|
| Advisory Vote 39 | Advisory Question | Aircraft Fuel Tax Increase Nonbinding Question: Maintain a tax increase on aircraft from 11 cents per gallon to 18 cents per gallon, generating an estimated $14 million in the first ten years, from Senate Bill 5974 of 2022 | Repealed | |
| Advisory Vote 40 | Advisory Question | Transportation Network Companies Tax Nonbinding Question: Maintain a tax on transportation network companies, from House Bill 2076 of 2022. | Repealed | |

== District of Columbia ==
Washington, D.C. November 2022 propositions
| Measure | Type | Description | Result | Reference |
|---|---|---|---|---|
| Initiative 82 | Citizen-initiated statute | Increase Minimum Wage for Tipped Employees Measure: Phase out the minimum wage exemption for tipped employees.; Match minimum hourly wage of tipped workers to that of non-tipped workers by July 1, 2027. | Passed | |

== West Virginia ==
West Virginia November 2022 propositions
| Measure | Type | Description | Result | Reference |
|---|---|---|---|---|
| Amendment 1 | Legislatively-referred constitutional amendment | No Court Authority over Impeachment Amendment: Prohibit state courts from having authority over impeachment proceedings by the West Virginia Legislature.; Prohibit state courts from reviewing impeachment judgments made by the West Virginia Senate. | Failed | |
| Amendment 2 | Legislatively-referred constitutional amendment | Authorize Tax Exemptions for Vehicles and Personal Property Used for Business Amendment: Authorize the West Virginia Legislature to exempt personal property used for business activity from property taxes. | Failed | |
| Amendment 3 | Legislatively-referred constitutional amendment | Incorporation of Religious Denominations and Churches Amendment: Allow the West Virginia Legislature to incorporate new churches and religious denominations. | Failed | |
| Amendment 4 | Legislatively-referred constitutional amendment | Legislative Approval of the State Board of Education Rules Amendment: Require the West Virginia Board of Education to submit its rules and policies to the West Virginia Legislature for approval, amendment, or rejection. | Failed | |

== Wyoming ==
Wyoming November 2022 propositions
| Measure | Type | Description | Result | Reference |
|---|---|---|---|---|
| Constitutional Amendment A | Legislatively-referred constitutional amendment | Local Government Stock Investing Amendment: Allow the Wyoming Legislature to provide that local governments can invest in stock and equities. This would require a two-thirds vote from both houses of the Legislature. | Passed | |
| Constitutional Amendment B | Legislatively-referred constitutional amendment | Judicial Retirement Age Measure: Increase the retirement age for state supreme court justices and district court judges from 70 to 75. | Failed | |
