= 2022 Oregon Ballot Measure 112 =

Ballot Measure 112
- November 8, 2022
- Remove Slavery as Punishment for Crime from Constitution Amendment

Results
Choice	Votes	%
Yes	1,047,028	55.59%
No	836,295	44.41%
Total votes	1,883,323	100.00%
- Yes: 50–60% 60–70% 70–80% No: 50–60% 60–70% 70–80% 80–90%

Oregon Ballot Measure 112, the Remove Slavery as Punishment for Crime from Constitution Amendment, is a legislatively-referred amendment to the Constitution of Oregon passed as part of the 2022 Oregon elections. The measure removes the penal exception clause, a loophole where slavery and involuntary servitude are legal within the state as punishment for a crime. It adds language authorizing Oregon courts and probation or parole agencies to order a person convicted of a crime to engage in education, counseling, treatment, community service, or other alternatives to incarceration, as part of sentencing for the crime.

Four other states—Alabama, Louisiana, Tennessee, and Vermont—considered similar amendments at the same time as Oregon (passed by all except Louisiana), and three states (Colorado, Nebraska and Utah) had previously voted to remove similar language.

== History ==
The project to promote the amendment was called Oregonians Against Slavery and Involuntary Servitude, or OASIS. Jordan Schott, a Willamette University student, initially conceived the project in 2020 during a criminal justice reform class taught by Professor Melissa Buis, where she met with incarcerated class facilitators Anthony Pickens, Theron Hall, and other adults in custody at the Oregon State Penitentiary (OSP) to understand their needs and the workings of the prison system. The partnership initially included Schott, Buis, former Willamette University students Niki Kates and Riley Burton, and members of Uhuru Sasa, an African American cultural club at OSP, whose members were actively involved and came up with the name for the project. Anthony Pickens was president of Uhuru Sasa at the project's outset, and continued his involvement in OASIS after he received a pardon from Governor Kate Brown and was released from prison in October 2021.

OASIS met regularly, crafted a bill, and lobbied for the Oregon Legislature to approve it for appearance on the ballot. Its chief sponsors were senators James Manning Jr., Lew Frederick, and Rob Wagner. After receiving feedback and concerns that the bill might disrupt existing voluntary work and education programs, OASIS members modified the language to explicitly allow voluntary work and education programs and other programs as alternatives to incarceration or fines. In June 2022, the updated bill returned to the Legislature, who voted to approve its appearance on the ballot that November. OASIS then created a PAC called Oregonians United to End Slavery to raise funds and educate the public about the measure. Angela Martin was the campaign director.

== Support and critiques ==
Organizations in support of the amendment included OASIS, ACLU of Oregon, the Human Rights Campaign, Associated Students of Oregon State University (OSU's student government), Oregon Corrective Enterprises, the Oregon Education Association, the Oregon Nurses Association, the Abolish Slavery National Network, the Asian Pacific American Network of Oregon, the Next Up Action Fund, the Oregon SEIU, Planned Parenthood Advocates of Oregon, the Urban League of Portland, the Oregon Progressive Alliance, and the League of Women Voters of Oregon. Other supporters include Multnomah County District Attorney Mike Schmidt, as well as state representatives Michael Dembrow, Lew Frederick, Sara Gelser Blouin, Elizabeth Steiner, Bill Kennemer, Tim Knopp, James Manning Jr., Chuck Riley, Rob Wagner, Janelle Bynum, Raquel Moore-Green, Travis Nelson, Rob Nosse, and Janeen Sollman.

Supporters argued that the bill would remove language that is "antiquated", and a "[vestige] of slavery and racist [policy]." Anthony Pickens of OASIS testified to the Oregon Legislature that the exemption clause should be removed because it was "out of date and downright degrading," and that Oregon should "lead the charge and show the world that ... no human should ever be considered a slave."

Sandy Chung of the Oregon ACLU argued that the amendment was a step toward solving the problem of mass incarceration. She also noted that the change in language would help inform the mindset of Corrections staff, stating,

"There were times when employees of the Oregon Department of Corrections would engage in harmful or negative types of conduct towards people who were incarcerated, and then would basically say ‘hey, you’re considered a slave by the Oregon state constitution."

— Sandy Chung

There was no formal campaign against Measure 112. However, the Oregon State Sheriffs' Association (OSSA) opposed it, with executive director Jason Myers stating in the voter's pamphlet that "it creates unintended consequences for Oregon jails that [would] result in the elimination of all reformative programs and increased costs to local jail operations."

Many who opposed the bill explicitly stated that they do not support slavery, and that their opposition to the measure was based on other concerns. Sandy Chung, executive director of the Oregon ACLU, said that no one in Oregon supports slavery–including those who opposed the measure.

Some critics claimed that the bill's language was too vague or ambiguous. Some, including Jason Myers of the OSSA, noted that "involuntary servitude" was not defined, and that as a consequence, any form of work that takes place in the context of incarceration without being directly ordered by a judge, probation officer, or parole officer may be considered involuntary servitude under the amended constitution. This, Myers claimed, would "very likely" mean that county jails would be barred from running existing work and community service programs, and as a result inmates would lose access to benefits (such as reduced sentences) of participating in those programs. State Senator Bill Hansell criticized the wording along the same lines, agreeing that the language of slavery should be removed but that changes to “the phrase on servitude and how that would affect law enforcement and corrections” went too far.

Critics also noted that if fewer prisoners worked, jails and prisons may have to find other sources of revenue, since products and services provided by inmates are often a major source of funding for these facilities, and sourcing labor outside the incarcerated population would increase the cost of production. (Note: Penal labor in the United States tends to be much cheaper than employing workers from outside of jails and prisons because incarcerated workers are paid at rates far below minimum wage.) Another aspect that received criticism was the scope; some, such as Rob Persson of the ODC (Note: The ODC is a government agency and therefore cannot officially support or oppose bills.) and Umatilla County Community Corrections Director Dale Primmer voiced concerns that the changes may not apply to county jails, or to people who are incarcerated while awaiting trial.

== Impact ==
As of June 2025, Oregon prisons and jails still offer work, community service, education, and other related programs, and there have been no program closures linked to Measure 112.

Measure 112 did not affect the part of the Constitution of Oregon that requires that prisoners spend 40 hours per week in work or training programs. This requirement, which was added with 1994 Oregon Ballot Measure 17, remains in the text as of April 2026.

== See also ==
- 2022 United States ballot measures
- Criminal justice reform in the United States
- Inside-Out Prison Exchange Program
- List of Oregon ballot measures
- List of Oregon prisons and jails
- Penal labor in the United States
- Slavery in the 21st century
