= 2004 Alabama Amendment 2 =

Referendum on segregation, poll tax, and publicly funded education

- November 2, 2004
- Proposing an amendment to the Constitution of Alabama of 1901, to repeal portions of Section 256 and Amendment 111 relating to separation of schools by race and repeal portions of Amendment 111 concerning constitutional construction against the right to education, and to repeal Section 259, Amendment 90, and Amendment 109 relating to the poll tax. (Proposed by Act 2003-203)

Results
Choice	Votes	%
Yes	689,450	49.93%
No	691,300	50.07%
County results
Yes
70–80%
60–70%
50–60%
No
70–80%
60–70%
50–60%

2004 Alabama Amendment 2 was a proposed amendment to the Alabama Constitution of 1901 to repeal the defunct requirement of racial segregation in schools, the defunct poll tax as a condition to vote, and a declaration that there was no right to a publicly funded education in Alabama.

Repeal of the first two Jim Crow laws, which had already been invalidated but still were on the books, was widely uncontroversial. However, contention existed over repealing the provision that denied the right of publicly funded schooling. Supporters, including Governors Bob Riley and Don Siegelman, argued that the changes would improve the image of the state. Opponents, including the recently-removed Chief Justice Roy Moore, framed the provision of publicly funded education as taxpayer-funded "gifts" rather than an issue of children's rights, while asserting that repeal of the clause would increase school taxes—something that they were against.

Even though opponents' legal arguments that such taxes would be imposed by court order were widely seen as dubious, their vocal opposition tanked the referendum. It narrowly failed, with 50.07% of Alabamians casting a vote against the changes.

== Background ==
Alabama Governor Bob Riley launched a constitutional reform commission, which, among other things, proposed to remove language related to school segregation and poll taxes. The separation of schools by race was outlawed in a series of state and federal court interventions, starting from the Supreme Court's verdict in Brown v. Board of Education (1954), while the Voting Rights Act of 1965 banned poll taxes. Both practices had arisen in an effort to discriminate against Blacks. Support for removing these clauses was widespread.

While debate over changing the constitution was ongoing, two Democratic lawmakers proposed to repeal another provision with strong racist connotations: a 1956 clause saying that the right to a publicly funded education did not exist in the state of Alabama. The provision was introduced as part of Whites' backlash over the Supreme Court's racial desegregation decision. The public education language did not attract much scrutiny or opposition in the legislature. HB587, which became Act 2003–203, was passed 91 to 0 in the State House and 29 to 0 in the State Senate, and included repeal of the 1956 public school clause.

=== Litigation over the denial of right to public schooling ===
In 1993, a trial judge found that the 1956 amendment conflicted with a clause in the original Alabama constitution that the state must provide "a liberal system of public schools throughout the state for the benefit of the children", and then struck the amendment down under the Equal Protection Clause of the Fourteenth Amendment of the United States Constitution because of the discriminatory purpose of the denial of the right to public education.

Four years later, the Supreme Court of Alabama suspended the ruling's enforcement to allow the state to come up with a plan, and ultimately shut down the litigation in 2002. While it did not overturn the trial court decision, it said that due to the separation of powers, Alabama courts have no role in ordering remedies to fix education, which is what the legislature and the executive are for. During litigation, the State Board of Education calculated compliance costs with the trial court ruling at $1.7 billion per year ($3 billion in 2025 dollars).

== Viewpoints ==
=== Support ===
Governor Bob Riley was in favor of the amendment, believing that if it passed, Alabama's image would be enhanced. Before the results were finalized, Riley said that if the amendment were to fail, he would create a new amendment leaving out a portion that was criticized by Roy Moore and those in opposition to the measure. "We'll give the people a chance to vote again." Riley also felt that those in opposition were incorrect in claiming that courts would have the ability to force the state to raise public school taxes.

Former governor Don Siegelman also backed the amendment, believing it to be important for the national image of Alabama and future economic development. Siegelman, like Bob Riley, argued that opponents were incorrect in thinking that federal courts would have the authority to force Alabama to raise public school taxes.

=== Opposition ===
Opponents included Roy Moore, then-recently removed chief justice of the Supreme Court of Alabama, the president of the Alabama Association for Judeo-Christian Values, and the president of the Alabama Christian Coalition. They consistently argued that they did not oppose the removal of clearly racist language. However, their contention was that the ballot measure was a backdoor attempt at increasing public education taxes. Their logic was that activist judges would construe the repeal as creating an enforceable right to publicly-funded education, and because of the state's poor quality of public schools, they would order extensive changes to education policies that would necessitate tax increases. A 1996 constitutional amendment prohibited state courts from ordering tax hikes to fund education, but Chief Justice Moore claimed that they could be forced by federal courts. Some of the federal court intervention fears stem from deep resentment that the state has for federal intervention – the resentment that took its roots as federal courts were overturning Jim Crow legislation during the Civil Rights Era. Moore added that the amendment was "a wolf in sheep's clothing" that would lessen the ability of parents to control their children's education.

Opponents also contended that public education was not a right, but rather a "gift" that every child is given at taxpayers' expense. The argument was not new – the previous year, opponents of property tax increases successfully used it against Governor Riley's efforts to relax restrictions on levying property taxes – already the lowest in the United States – to fund public schools.

== Contents ==
The following information was shown to voters for Amendment 2:

Proposing an amendment to the Constitution of Alabama of 1901, to repeal portions of Section 256 and Amendment 111 relating to separation of schools by race and repeal portions of Amendment 111 concerning constitutional construction against the right to education, and to repeal Section 259, Amendment 90, and Amendment 109 relating to the poll tax. (Proposed by Act 2003-203)

== Results ==
The measure was defeated by less than 2,000 votes, leaving the segregation, poll tax, and publicly funded education clauses still on the books. Counties with higher Black populations tended to vote in favor of the amendment; but wealth, urban/rural split or population dynamics had at best a weak correlation with voting either way.

County	Yes		No	
County	#	%	#	%
Autauga	6,959	45.9	8,204	54.1
Baldwin	29,118	55.1	23,773	44.9
Barbour	3,344	52.3	3,047	47.7
Bibb	2,081	33.4	4,146	66.6
Blount	5,497	32.1	11,615	67.9
Bullock	1,296	58.1	933	41.9
Butler	3,010	52.2	2,750	47.8
Calhoun	16,284	46.7	18,572	53.3
Chambers	4,641	54.7	3,845	45.3
Cherokee	2,323	37.7	3,848	62.3
Chilton	4,932	38.4	7,919	61.6
Choctaw	2,252	50.5	2,210	49.5
Clarke	4,007	55.9	3,159	44.1
Clay	1,727	36.6	2,990	63.4
Cleburne	1,628	44.2	2,051	55.8
Coffee	6,410	52.0	5,930	48.0
Colbert	8,145	49.8	8,166	50.2
Conecuh	2,000	57.4	1,471	42.6
Coosa	1,521	42.1	2,090	57.9
Covington	4,880	50.7	4,744	49.3
Crenshaw	1,697	49.0	1,769	51.0
Cullman	9,687	34.9	18,105	65.1
Dale	6,175	45.8	7,314	54.2
Dallas	6,063	51.4	5,744	48.6
DeKalb	5,591	39.0	8,731	61.0
Elmore	9,551	43.7	12,290	56.3
Escambia	3,638	51.1	3,480	48.9
Etowah	12,802	38.8	20,182	61.2
Fayette	1,915	31.4	4,161	68.6
Franklin	2,810	36.2	4,965	63.8
Geneva	2,929	42.5	3,960	57.5
Greene	2,188	71.2	897	28.8
Hale	2,452	45.5	2,982	54.5
Henry	2,164	48.6	2,289	51.4
Houston	12,259	47.4	13,615	52.6
Jackson	5,486	45.0	6,692	55.0
Jefferson	139,396	58.1	100,282	41.9
Lamar	1,660	38.2	2,685	61.8
Lauderdale	12,269	48.8	12,889	51.2
Lawrence	3,758	39.6	5,733	60.4
Lee	22,398	66.1	11,488	33.9
Limestone	7,407	32.1	15,658	67.9
Lowndes	2,245	59.6	1,519	40.4
Macon	4,715	70.1	2,064	29.9
Madison	58,258	57.8	42,614	42.2
Marengo	3,353	51.8	3,140	48.2
Marion	2,818	30.2	6,541	69.8
Marshall	8,827	38.0	14,428	62.0
Mobile	50,555	52.1	46,500	47.9
Monroe	2,916	53.3	2,557	46.7
Montgomery	33,723	57.4	25,008	42.6
Morgan	14,919	42.0	20,622	58.0
Perry	2,411	61.5	1,515	38.5
Pickens	2,935	45.2	3,559	54.8
Pike	3,929	49.7	3,974	50.3
Randolph	2,551	46.8	2,895	53.2
Russell	5,836	56.5	4,497	43.5
St. Clair	8,465	35.3	15,506	64.7
Shelby	33,843	51.7	31,593	48.3
Sumter	2,366	63.6	1,360	36.4
Talladega	11,071	46.4	12,799	53.6
Tallapoosa	6,413	51.6	6,009	48.4
Tuscaloosa	28,178	50.5	27,686	49.5
Walker	6,602	28.4	16,626	71.6
Washington	1,898	33.6	3,752	66.4
Wilcox	2,208	59.7	1,516	40.3
Winston	2,065	26.7	5,646	73.3
Total	689,450	49.93	691,300	50.07

== Aftermath and analysis ==
The inclusion of a repeal of the 1956 education clause played a central role in the defeat of the amendment. Competing theories suggested reasons as to why the measure was defeated; one argued that it was due to lingering, concealed racism; another said that it was because of voter suspicion of any constitutional amendment; and another said the tax clause was fully to blame. The majority of state newspapers and legal scholars found the argument about tax hikes ridiculous. For example, Pratik Shah wrote in the Alabama Law Review that the supposed scheme to increase taxes could not be enacted on a state level because of the 2002 Alabama Supreme Court decision saying that such remedies would violate the separation of powers and the 1996 anti-tax amendment; while federal courts, even if they could find jurisdiction, would likely need to extensively interpret state laws, which they would be unwilling to do.

Patrick R. Cotter of the University of Alabama said that the ballot measure was the most discussed issue during the 2004 election in the state, surpassing attention given to any other federal or state race. He suggested that the defeat of the ballot measure signalled a decline in importance of the state Democratic party, which at the time of the amendment was still fairly competitive with its Republican rivals. The Democratic campaign deprioritized the state in the 2004 election, believing that presidential candidate John Kerry would not carry the state, and indeed he only received 37% of votes.

Following rejection of the amendment, State Senator Wendell Mitchell pledged to introduce a new amendment in February 2005, this time omitting a repeal of the publicly funded education provision. Mitchell believed that the removal of segregation era language from the state's constitution without the education clause would be "decisively approved by voters." In 2022, Alabama voted on a separate constitutional amendment, 2022 Alabama Recompiled Constitution Ratification Question, which, among other things, removed all racist language.

== See also ==
- Civil rights referendum
- Civil rights movement
