= 2024 California Proposition 6 =

Proposition 6
- November 5, 2024
- Ban Involuntary Servitude as Punishment for Crime

Results
Choice	Votes	%
Yes	6,895,604	46.66%
No	7,882,137	53.34%
Registered voters/turnout		54.9%

No
90–100%
80–90%
70–80%
60–70%
50–60%
Yes
90–100%
80–90%
70–80%
60–70%
50–60%

Proposition 6, titled Remove Involuntary Servitude as Punishment for Crime Amendment, was a California ballot proposition and constitutional amendment that failed in the 2024 general election on November 5. The proposition, if passed, would have repealed the line "Involuntary servitude is prohibited except to punish crime" from the California Constitution, replacing it with language saying that involuntary servitude is prohibited absolutely.

== Support ==
Supporters argued that "Proposition 6 ends slavery in California and upholds human rights and dignity for everyone. It replaces carceral involuntary servitude with voluntary work programs, has bipartisan support, and aligns with national efforts to reform the 13th Amendment. It will prioritize rehabilitation, lower recidivism, and improve public safety, resulting in taxpayer savings."

"Yes on Prop. 6" has raised $2.07 million as of October 30, 2024.

Supporters

Federal officials

- Barbara Lee, U.S. Representative from CA-12 (1998–2025)
- Maxine Waters, U.S. Representative from CA-43 (1991–present)

State legislators

- Lori Wilson, state assemblymember from the 11th district (2022–present)

Municipal officials

- Karen Bass, Mayor of Los Angeles (2022–present) and former U.S. Representative from CA-37 (2011-2022)

Notable individuals

- Dolores Huerta, co-founder of the United Farm Workers

Organizations

- ACLU California Action
- Anti-Recidivism Coalition
- California Teachers Association
- California Legislative Black Caucus
- League of Women Voters of California
- Council on American-Islamic Relations California
- Law Enforcement Action Partnership

Political parties

- California Democratic Party

Labor unions

- California Labor Federation

Newspapers and publications

- The Los Angeles Times
- The Sacramento Bee
- The San Francisco Chronicle

== Opposition ==
No official argument against Proposition 6 was submitted to the California Secretary of State and no opponents were listed on the ballot. However, public polling has shown the oppose side leading.

The oppose side has not established an official campaign and raised $0 as of October 30, 2024.

Opponents

Organizations

- Howard Jarvis Taxpayers Association

Political parties

- California Republican Party

Newspapers and publications

- The Orange County Register
- The San Diego Union-Tribune
- The Mercury News/East Bay Times

== Polling ==
Date of opinion poll	Conducted by	Sample size	In favor	Against	Undecided	Margin	Margin of Error
October 7–15, 2024	Public Policy Institute of California	1,137; LV	41%	56%	4%	15% Against	±3.1%
August 29 – September 11, 2024	Public Policy Institute of California	1,071; LV	46%	50%	4%	3% Against	±3.7%

== Results ==
The proposition failed with 6,895,604 (46.7 percent) "yes" votes and 7,882,137 (53.3%) "no" votes.

== See also ==
- 13th (film)
- 2018 Colorado Amendment A
- 2024 United States ballot measures
- Convict leasing
- List of California ballot propositions
- Penal labor in the United States
- Repeal of exceptions to slavery and involuntary servitude
- Slavery in the United States
