= Gradual abolition of slavery =

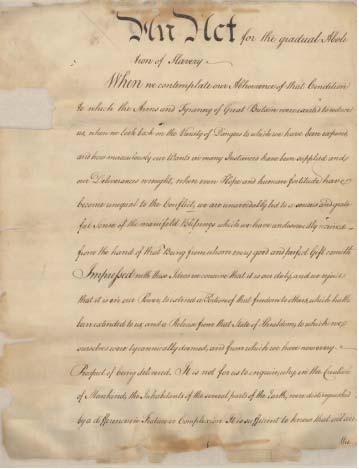
An Act for the Gradual Abolition of Slavery (1780), an early example of gradualist legislation

The gradual abolition of slavery took place in the Northern United States, the British Empire, and parts of Latin America during the late eighteenth and nineteenth centuries, as part of the end of slavery in the Americas. It was the dominant viewpoint among abolitionists until the 1820s, when it was eclipsed by calls for immediate emancipation.

== History ==
=== United States ===
Pennsylvania's An Act for the Gradual Abolition of Slavery of 1780 was the first legislative attempt to gradually abolish slavery in the United States. It specified that "every Negro and Mulatto child born within the State after the passing of the Act [1780] would be free upon reaching age twenty-eight." Once the Pennsylvania residents were freed, they were supposed to be treated the same as indentured servants who were contracted for four years of service. For instance, they were to receive tools of their trade or other privileges.

Four other Northern states adopted policies to at least gradually abolish slavery: New Hampshire and Massachusetts in 1783, and Connecticut and Rhode Island in 1784. The Republic of Vermont had already limited slavery in its original constitution (1777), before it joined the United States as the 14th state in 1791. These state jurisdictions thus enacted the first abolition laws in the Americas. By the 1820s, all Northern states enacted laws for either gradual or immediate emancipation. By 1860, U.S. Census data showed that almost all Northern states had no slaves except for New Jersey which had enacted such gradual emancipation that there were still 18 slaves enumerated by the census.

Abraham Lincoln proposed an amendment to the Constitution for gradual emancipation in 1861 and 1862, culminating with the Second Message to Congress in December 1862. However, he realized that immediate emancipation was what was needed, because there was increasing support for emancipation in the north and slaves helped the Confederates during the war. This led to the Emancipation Proclamation, which went into effect on January 1, 1863. The Thirteenth Amendment to the United States Constitution was ratified at the end of the war, making slavery illegal in every state, and all enslaved people were freed.

=== Latin America ===
Starting in the early 19th century, the concept of gradual abolition spread from the US to Latin America, where it became known as Freedom of wombs. They contained two fundamental measures which consisted of prohibiting transatlantic slave trading and then later the complete abolition of slavery. The policies were adopted in Colombia, Ecuador, Uruguay, Brazil, and parts of the Caribbean.

=== British Empire ===
In 1833, Parliament passed the landmark Act to Abolish Slavery, which took a phased approach to emancipating slaves. It stipulated that:

- Young children would be granted freedom immediately
- Young adults would be subject to an apprenticeship program as laborers, where the period of compulsory labor would sometimes last four years.
- A five year grace period, all slaves were gradually emancipated but the process would not complete until August 1, 1838.

Additionally, the former slave owners received compensation in an arrangement that essentially concluded all ownership of slave property.

== See also ==
- Compensated emancipation
- Penal labor exception
  - Penal exception clause
- Slave states and free states
- Timeline of abolition of slavery and serfdom
- Timeline of events leading to the American Civil War
