= Penal labour exception =

Legal exception to prohibitions of slavery or involuntary servitude

The penal labor exception is a legal exception to prohibitions of slavery or involuntary servitude. Penal labor exceptions are found in national constitutions in multiple countries, most notably in the United States (including in multiple US state constitutions). A penal labor exception is also found in international law.

== International law ==
Article 8 of the International Covenant on Civil and Political Rights states: "No one shall be held in slavery; slavery and the slave-trade in all their forms shall be prohibited. 2. No one shall be held in servitude. 3. (a) No one shall be required to perform forced or compulsory labour; (b) Paragraph 3 (a) shall not be held to preclude, in countries where imprisonment with hard labour may be imposed as a punishment for a crime, the performance of hard labour in pursuance of a sentence to such punishment by a competent court..."

== By country ==
=== Germany ===
Article 12 of the Basic Law for the Federal Republic of Germany states that "Forced labour may be imposed only on persons deprived of their liberty by the judgment of a court."

=== Japan ===
Article 18 of the Constitution of Japan states that "No person shall be held in bondage of any kind. Involuntary servitude, except as punishment for crime, is prohibited."

=== Philippines ===
Section 18(2) of the Constitution of the Philippines states that "No involuntary servitude in any form shall exist except as a punishment for a crime whereof the party shall have been duly convicted."

=== Singapore ===
The Constitution of Singapore states that "No person shall be held in slavery" and that "All forms of forced labour are prohibited" but that "Work incidental to the serving of a sentence of imprisonment imposed by a court of law shall not be taken to be forced labour within the meaning of this Article."

== See also ==
- Abolitionism
- Gradual abolition of slavery
- Penal labour
- Slavery at common law
- Slavery in international law
- Slavery in the 21st century
- Timeline of abolition of slavery and serfdom
