= 2022 Oregon Ballot Measure 111 =

Ballot Measure 111
- Right to Healthcare Amendment

Results
Choice	Votes	%
Yes	951,446	50.73%
No	924,231	49.27%
Total votes	1,875,677	100.00%
- Yes: 50–60% 60–70% No: 50–60% 60–70% 70–80%

Oregon Ballot Measure 111, the Right to Healthcare Amendment, is an amendment to the Constitution of Oregon that voters passed as part of the 2022 Oregon elections. The amendment states that "It is the obligation of the state to ensure that every resident of Oregon has access to cost-effective, clinically appropriate and affordable health care as a fundamental right." This measure makes Oregon the first state with a constitutional right to healthcare.

The amendment notes that this "must be balanced against the public interest funding public schools and other essential public services", but does not cover how healthcare would be funded.

== Text ==
The amendment created a new section within Article 1 of Oregon Constitution.

SECTION 47. (1) It is the obligation of the state to ensure that every resident of Oregon has access to cost-effective, clinically appropriate and affordable health care as a fundamental right.

(2) The obligation of the state described in subsection (1) of this section must be balanced against the public interest in funding public schools and other essential public services, and any remedy arising from an action brought against the state to enforce the provisions of this section may not interfere with the balance described in this subsection.

== Endorsements ==
Yes

U.S. senators

- Jeff Merkley, U.S. senator from Oregon

State legislators

- Rob Wagner, majority leader of the Oregon State Senate and state senator from the 19th district
- Elizabeth Steiner Hayward, state senator from the 17th district
- Tina Kotek, former speaker of the Oregon House of Representatives and state representative from the 44th district, and 2022 candidate for governor
- Rob Nosse, state representative from the 42nd district

Labor unions

- Oregon AFL–CIO
- AFT-Oregon
- Oregon Federation of Nurses and Health Professionals, AFT Local 5017
- Oregon AFSCME
- American Federation of Musicians Local 99
- Oregon Education Association
- Service Employees International Union Oregon State Council (Locals 49 and 503)
- United Food and Commercial Workers Local 555
- Pineros y Campesinos Unidos del Noroeste
- Oregon AFSCME Retirees Chapter 75

Political Parties

- Democratic Party of Oregon
- Oregon Progressive Party

Newspapers

- Pamplin Media (Portland Tribune)
- Willamette Week
- The Skanner
- Street Roots
- The Source Weekly
- Eugene Weekly
- Portland Mercury

Organizations

- Providence Health & Services
- Oregon Nurses Association
- Planned Parenthood Advocates of Oregon
- CareOregon
- Virginia Garcia Memorial Health Center
- Oregon Academy of Family Physicians
- Oregon College of Nurse-Midwives
- Oregon Physicians for Social Responsibility
- Physicians for a National Health Program Oregon
- Oregon Public Health Association
- Urban League of Portland
- ACLU of Oregon
- Associated Students of Oregon State University
- Oregon NOW
- Basic Rights Oregon
- Oregon Food Bank
- Oregon Recovers
- AAUW of Oregon
- Portland Jobs with Justice
- Southern Oregon Jobs with Justice
- League of Women Voters of Oregon
- Consolidated Oregon Indivisible Network
- Oregon League of Conservation Voters
- Sierra Club Oregon Chapter
- NAACP Portland Branch 1120
No

Statewide officials

- John Kitzhaber, former governor of Oregon

State legislators

- Fred Girod, state senator from the 9th district and former minority leader of the Oregon State Senate
- Betsy Johnson, former state senator from the 16th district and 2022 candidate for governor
- Christine Drazan, former minority leader of the Oregon House of Representatives and state representative from the 39th district
- Kim Wallan, state representative from the 6th district
- Ron Noble, state representative from the 24th district
- Julie Parrish, former state representative from the 37th House district

Political parties

- Oregon Republican Party

Newspapers

- The Oregonian
- The Bulletin

== See also ==
- List of Oregon ballot measures
- 2022 United States ballot measures
- 2012 Wyoming Amendment A, amendment asserting individual consent in healthcare decisions
