= 2022 Tennessee Amendment 3 =

Amendment 3
- November 8, 2022
- Shall Article I, Section 33 of the Constitution of Tennessee be amended by deleting the section and substituting instead the following? "Section 33. Slavery and involuntary servitude are forever prohibited. Nothing in this section shall prohibit an inmate from working when the inmate has been duly convicted of a crime."

Results
Choice	Votes	%
Yes	1,294,296	79.53%
No	333,071	20.47%
Valid votes	1,627,367	100.00%
Invalid or blank votes	0	0.00%
Total votes	1,627,367	100.00%
- County results Yes 80–90% 70–80% 60–70%

The Tennessee Constitutional Amendment: 3, commonly known as Amendment 3 or the Remove Slavery as Punishment for Crime from Constitution Amendment, is an approved legislatively referred constitutional amendment to the Constitution of Tennessee that appeared on November 8, 2022. The proposed amendment modifies Article I, Section 33 of the Tennessee Constitution, removing the existing provision that allows slavery and involuntary servitude as punishment for convicted individuals. Instead, the amendment explicitly states that slavery and involuntary servitude are prohibited while allowing inmates to work if they are duly convicted of a crime. The change seeks to clarify and restrict the use of involuntary labor within the state.

Every county in the state voted in favor of this amendment, with "Yes" getting nearly 80% of the vote.

== Content ==
The proposal will add this language to Article XI of the Constitution of Tennessee as follows:

“Slavery and involuntary servitude are forever prohibited. Nothing in this section shall prohibit an inmate from working when the inmate has been duly convicted of a crime.”

The Tennessee Secretary of State's official summary of the amendment on the ballot for November 8, 2022, is as follows:

"This amendment would change the current language in article I, section 33 of the Tennessee Constitution, which says that slavery and involuntary servitude, except as punishment for a person who has been duly convicted of crime, are forever prohibited in this State. The amendment would delete this current language and replace it with the following language: “Slavery and involuntary servitude are forever prohibited. Nothing in this section shall prohibit an inmate from working when the inmate has been duly convicted of a crime.”

The Tennessee Secretary of State's official title of the amendment on the ballot for November 8, 2022, is as follows:

Shall Article I, Section 33 of the Constitution of Tennessee be amended by deleting the section and substituting instead the following? "Section 33. Slavery and involuntary servitude are forever prohibited. Nothing in this section shall prohibit an inmate from working when the inmate has been duly convicted of a crime."

A vote for Amendment 3 supports amending the state constitution by eliminating the provision permitting slavery and involuntary servitude as criminal penalties. Instead, it introduces the declaration, "Slavery and involuntary servitude are permanently banned," thereby prohibiting these practices.

A vote against Amendment 3 opposes the proposal, and wouldn't change language in article I, section 33 of the Tennessee Constitution.

== Supporters ==
Most Republican and Democratic lawmakers supported this amendment when it was introduced in the General Assembly and put on the ballot, along with Governor Bill Lee and Jason Martin, the Republican and Democratic nominees for governor. The Human Rights Campaign also supported voting "Yes" on the amendment. Raumesh Akbari, a Democratic senator from Memphis, stated, "Our constitution should reflect our values, and it's important that we not have any loopholes that will say in any circumstance slavery is permissible. I think it's an ugly part of our history that needs to be completely put to bed."

== Opponents ==
There were some but few opponents to this amendment. Senators Brian Kelsey and Joey Hensley were key figures who opposed the amendment. Kelsey states, "I just think it's ultimately fake history to be telling our voters next year that the 1870 Constitution allowed slavery. It clearly did not, and it was passed five years after Tennessee and the United States ratified the 13th Amendment, forever prohibiting slavery. So that to me, Mr. Speaker is fake history, and for that reason, I'll actually be voting no."

== See also ==
- 13th (film)
- Slavery in the United States
- Penal labor in the United States
- Convict leasing
- Repeal of exceptions to slavery and involuntary servitude
- 2022 Tennessee elections
