= Penal exception clause =

In the United States, the 13th Amendment to the Constitution states the following:

Section 1. Neither slavery nor involuntary servitude, except as a punishment for crime whereof the party shall have been duly convicted, shall exist within the United States, or any place subject to their jurisdiction.

This prohibits slavery and involuntary servitude, but leaves an exception for punishment for a crime of which one has been convicted. Various commentators have accused states of abusing this provision to re-establish systems similar to slavery, or of otherwise exploiting such labor in a manner unfair to local labor.

Starting in the late 2010s and extending into the mid-2020s, a movement emerged to repeal the exception clause from both the federal and state constitutions. As of February 2026, eight states had joined Rhode Island in repealing the exception clause from their state constitutions, while 26 states' constitutions make no mention of either slavery or involuntary servitude and 15 states retain an exception clause.

Map of states where slavery or involuntary servitude as punishment for a crime is permitted in the state constitution Penal exception for slavery and/or involuntary servitude Total prohibition of slavery and involuntary servitude No mention of slavery or involuntary servitude in text

== History ==
Few records of the committee's deliberations during the drafting of the Thirteenth Amendment survive, and the debate that followed both in Congress and in the state legislatures featured almost no discussion of this provision. It was apparently considered noncontroversial at the time, or at least legislators gave it little thought. The drafters based the amendment's phrasing on the Northwest Ordinance of 1787, which features an identical exception. Thomas Jefferson authored an early version of that ordinance's anti-slavery clause, including the exception of punishment for a crime, and also sought to prohibit slavery in general after 1800. Jefferson was an admirer of the works of Italian criminologist Cesare Beccaria. Beccaria's On Crimes and Punishments suggested that the death penalty should be abolished and replaced with a lifetime of enslavement for the worst criminals; Jefferson likely included the clause due to his agreement with Beccaria. Beccaria, while attempting to reduce "legal barbarism" of the 1700s, considered forced labor one of the few harsh punishments acceptable; for example, he advocated slave labor as a just punishment for robbery, so that the thief's labor could be used to pay recompense to their victims and to society. Penal "hard labor" has ancient origins, and was adopted early in American history (as in Europe) often as a substitute for capital or corporal punishment.

The discriminatory post-Civil War Black Codes passed in the South criminalized "vagrancy", which was largely enforced against freed slaves. Later, convict leasing programs in the South allowed local plantations to rent inexpensive prisoner labor. While many of these programs have been phased out (leasing of convicts, for example, was forbidden by President Franklin D. Roosevelt in 1941), prison labor continues in the U.S. under a variety of justifications. Prison labor programs vary widely; some are uncompensated prison maintenance tasks, some are for local government maintenance tasks, some are for local businesses, and others are closer to internships. Modern rationales for prison labor programs often include reduction of recidivism and re-acclimation to society; the idea is that such labor programs will make it easier for the prisoner upon release to find gainful employment rather than relapse to criminality. However, this topic is not well-studied, and much of the work offered is so menial as to be unlikely to improve employment prospects. As of 2017, most prison labor programs did compensate prisoners, but generally with very low wages. What wages prisoners do earn are often heavily garnished, with as much as 80% of their paychecks withheld in the harshest cases.

== List of amendments ==
=== Federal ===
- Neither slavery nor involuntary servitude, except as a punishment for crime whereof the party shall have been duly convicted, shall exist within the United States, or any place subject to their jurisdiction. Amendment XIII, Section 1.

=== State ===
==== With exceptions ====
- Arkansas - Article II, Section 27: There shall be no slavery in this State, nor involuntary servitude, except as a punishment for crime.
- California - Article I, Section 6: Slavery is prohibited. Involuntary servitude is prohibited, except to punish crime.
- Georgia - Article I, Paragraph XX: There shall be no involuntary servitude within the State of Georgia except as a punishment for crime after legal conviction thereof or for contempt of court.
- Indiana - Article I, Section 37: There shall be neither slavery, nor involuntary servitude, within the State, otherwise than for the punishment of crimes, whereof the party shall have been duly convicted.
- Iowa - Article I, Section 23: There shall be no slavery in this State; nor shall there be involuntary servitude, unless for the punishment of crime.
- Kansas - Bill of Rights, Section 6: There shall be no slavery in this state; and no involuntary servitude, except for the punishment of crime, whereof the party shall have been duly convicted.
- Kentucky - Article I, Section 25: Slavery and involuntary servitude in this state are forbidden, except as a punishment of crimes, whereof the party shall have been duly convicted.
- Louisiana - Article I, Section 3: Slavery and involuntary servitude are prohibited, except in the latter case as punishment for crime.
- Michigan - Article I, Section 9: Neither slavery nor involuntary servitude, unless for the punishment of crimes, shall ever be tolerated in this State.
- Minnesota - Article I, Section 2: No member of this state shall be disfranchised or deprived of any of the rights or privileges secured to any citizen thereof, unless by the law of the land or the judgement of his peers. There shall be neither slavery nor involuntary servitude in the state, otherwise than as punishment for a crime of which the party has been convicted.
- Mississippi - Article III, Section 15: There shall be neither slavery nor involuntary servitude in this State, otherwise than in the punishment of crime, whereof the party shall have been duly convicted.
- North Carolina - Article I Section 17: Slavery is forever prohibited. Involuntary servitude, except as a punishment for crime whereof the parties have been adjudged guilty, is forever prohibited.
- North Dakota - Article I, Section 17: Neither slavery nor involuntary servitude, unless for the punishment of crimes, shall ever be tolerated in this State.
- Ohio - Article I, Section 6: There shall be no slavery in this state; nor involuntary servitude, unless for the punishment of crime.
- Wisconsin - Article I, Section 2: There shall be neither slavery, nor involuntary servitude in this state, otherwise than for the punishment of crime, of which the party shall have been duly convicted.

==== Without exceptions ====
- Alabama: That no form of slavery shall exist in this state; and there shall not be any involuntary servitude~~, otherwise than for the punishment of crime, of which the party shall have been duly convicted~~. Alabama Constitution, Section 32 (Amended 2022 by 76% of voters)
- Colorado: There shall never be in this state either slavery or involuntary servitude~~, except as a punishment for crime, whereof the party shall have been duly convicted~~. Colorado Constitution Article 2, Section 26 (Amended 2018 by 66% of voters)
- Nebraska: There shall be neither slavery nor involuntary servitude in this state, ~~otherwise than for punishment of crime, whereof the party shall have been duly convicted~~. Article I, Section 2 (Amended 2020 by 68% of voters)
- Nevada: Neither slavery nor involuntary servitude~~, unless for the punishment of crimes,~~ shall ever be tolerated in this State. Article I, Section 17 (Amended 2024 by 61% of voters).
- Oregon: Article I, Section 34 (Amended 2022 by 55% of voters):
  - (1) There shall be neither slavery nor involuntary servitude in ~~the State, otherwise than for the punishment of crime, of which the party shall have been duly convicted~~ this state.
  - (2) Upon conviction of a crime, an Oregon court or a probation or parole agency may order the convicted person to engage in education, counseling, treatment, community service or other alternatives to incarceration, as part of sentencing for the crime, in accordance with programs that have been in place historically or that may be developed in the future, to provide accountability, reformation, protection of society or rehabilitation.
- Tennessee:
  - ~~That~~ Slavery and involuntary servitude~~, except as a punishment for crime, whereof the party shall have been duly convicted,~~ are forever prohibited. Nothing in this section shall prohibit an inmate from working when the inmate has been duly convicted of a crime. Article I, Section 33 (Amended 2022 by 79% of voters)
  - The General Assembly shall make no law recognizing the right of property in man. Article I, Section 34.
- Utah: Article I, Section 21 (a 2020 amendment to remove the exception was approved by 81% of voters)
  - (1) Neither slavery nor involuntary servitude~~, except as a punishment for crime, whereof the party shall have been duly convicted~~ shall exist within this State.
  - (2) Subsection (1) does not apply to the otherwise lawful administration of the criminal justice system.
- Vermont: That all men are born equally free and independent, and have certain natural, inherent, and unalienable rights, amongst which are the enjoying and defending life and liberty, acquiring, possessing and protecting property, and pursuing and obtaining happiness and safety; therefore ~~no person born in this country, or brought from over sea, ought to be holden by law, to serve any person as a servant, slave or apprentice, after he arrives to the age of twenty-one years, unless he is bound by his own consent, after he arrives to such age, or bound by law for the payment of debts, damages, fines, costs, or the like~~ slavery and indentured servitude in any form are prohibited. Chapter I, Article 1st (Amended 2022 by 88% of voters)
- Rhode Island: Slavery shall not be permitted in this State. Article I, Section 4.

== State constitutions with no mentions of slavery or involuntary servitude ==
- Alaska
- Arizona
- Connecticut
- Delaware
- Florida
- Hawaii
- Idaho
- Illinois
- Maine
- Maryland
- Massachusetts
- Missouri
- Montana
- New Hampshire
- New Jersey
- New Mexico
- New York
- Oklahoma
- Pennsylvania
- South Carolina
- South Dakota
- Texas
- Virginia
- Washington
- West Virginia
- Wyoming

== Reform and repeal ==
In 2018, Colorado became the first state to repeal the exception clause from their state's constitution with the passing of Amendment A. Similar bills also passed with voter approval in Utah and Nebraska in 2020. In Alabama, a 2020 measure was approved by voters allowing for the Alabama Legislature to recompile the state constitution in order to remove racist language and include a similar exception repeal, with the newly ratified constitution approved by voters in November 2022. The legislatures of Vermont and Oregon sent similar amendments to voters for a vote in 2022, both of which were passed. Tennessee's legislature approved similar language for a 2022 ballot after two consecutive sessions, but, like Utah's 2020 revision, included a subsection clarifying that the prohibition will not "prohibit an inmate from working when the inmate has been duly convicted of a crime". The amendment was passed by referendum.

In 2021, Nikema Williams and Jeff Merkley introduced legislation (H.J.Res.53/S.J.Res.21) in the 117th Congress to repeal the exception clause from the U.S. Constitution.

A resolution to bring a repeal to the California state constitution in 2022 was passed unanimously in the California State Assembly. The resolution failed to receive enough votes and was not passed by the California State Senate before the end of the session, preventing it from appearing on the November 2022 ballot. Similar legislation was passed by the legislature and appeared on the November 2024 ballot, but the measure was rejected by voters.

A penal exception repeal was sent to the November 2024 ballot by the Nevada Legislature in February 2022. It was approved by 60.6% of voters in the November 2024 elections.

== Analysis ==
One report commissioned by Worth Rises argued that repealing the exception clause and allowing fairer labor practices and wage increases to apply to voluntary prison labor would net between USD$18.3 billion and USD$20.3 billion annually in fiscal benefits for state governments.

== See also ==
- 13th (film)
- Penal labor exception
- Penal labor in the United States
- Convict lease
- Felony disenfranchisement in the United States
