= 2018 Colorado Amendment A =

Amendment A
- Removal of Exception to Slavery Prohibition for Criminals Amendment

Results
Choice	Votes	%
Yes	1,599,790	66.21%
No	816,342	33.79%
Valid votes	2,416,132	94.13%
Invalid or blank votes	150,652	5.87%
Total votes	2,566,784	100.00%
Registered voters/turnout	3,953,613	64.92%

For
90–100%
80%–90%
70%–80%
60%–70%
50%–60%
Against
90–100%
80–90%
70–80%
60–70%
50–60%
Other
Tie
No data
- Election was held: November 6, 2018

Colorado Amendment A was a 2018 referendum to amend Article II, Section 26 of the Constitution of Colorado to remove language permitting slavery and involuntary servitude only as punishment for crime.

== Summary ==
Article II, Section 26 of the Constitution of Colorado previously stated:

"There shall never be in this state either slavery or involuntary servitude, except as a punishment for crime, whereof the party shall have been duly convicted."

An organization to remove the language, Abolish Slavery Colorado, collected signatures to put the question on the ballot in 2016 as Colorado Amendment T, but it failed by less than 1%. Advocates of the initiative blamed the wording of the question, which stated:

"Shall there be an amendment to the Colorado constitution concerning the removal of the exception to the prohibition of slavery and involuntary servitude when used as punishment for persons duly convicted of a crime?"

In 2018, the question was changed for clarity and put before voters, requiring a 55% affirmative vote to pass. The question was:

"Shall there be an amendment to the Colorado constitution that prohibits slavery and involuntary servitude as punishment for a crime and thereby prohibits slavery and involuntary servitude in all circumstances?"

The 2018 question was passed by 66.23% of voters on November 6. As a result, Article II, Section 26 of the Colorado Constitution now simply reads:

"There shall never be in this state either slavery or involuntary servitude."

== Impact ==
A lawsuit was filed in July 2020 by three inmates and one former inmates against Gov. Jared Polis, the Colorado Department of Corrections and a private prison operator under Amendment A to increase wages for penal labor from USD0.10 an hour, which the inmates described as "slave wages", to the current Colorado minimum wage (USD12 an hour as of 2020), in addition to paid sick leave and vacation time. This is considered the first lawsuit under the amendment to seek reform of the penal labor practices in the Colorado corrections system.

== See also ==
- 13th (film)
- Slavery in the United States
- Penal labor in the United States
- Convict leasing
- Repeal of exceptions to slavery and involuntary servitude
