= 2022 Iowa Amendment 1 =

- Establishes a fundamental right to keep and bear arms in the Iowa State Constitution.

Results
Choice	Votes	%
Yes	748,363	65.17%
No	399,959	34.83%
Valid votes	1,148,322	100.00%
Invalid or blank votes	0	0.00%
Total votes	1,148,322	100.00%

Yes 50–60% 60–70% 70–80% 80–90%
No 50–60% 60–70%

2022 Iowa Amendment 1 was an amendment to the 1857 Constitution of Iowa that passed on November 8, 2022, via a statewide referendum concurrent with other elections across the state. This amendment adds a provision to the constitution of Iowa declaring that there is a fundamental individual right to keep and bear arms and establishes that any state laws regarding guns "shall be subject to strict scrutiny".
