= Civil rights referendum =

A civil rights referendum or human rights referendum is any act of direct democracy which allows for a vote on the granting or amendment of current civil rights, liberties or associations as recognized by a government. Such referendums have frequently been proposed as a means by which the majority of the voting public in a polity, rather than the judicial or legislative chambers of government, could determine what the state should recognize or carry out, while such referendums have been strongly criticized by civil rights organizations and professional bodies as means by which the majority of the public could vote on the rights of a vulnerable minority according to contemporary prejudices.

== United States ==
=== LGBT rights and same-sex marriage ===
Civil rights referendums have been frequently proposed by those in ideological rejection against lesbian, gay, bisexual or transgender rights, most often due to Abrahamic religious objections against homosexuality. In countries where governments have passed, activists have frequently sought to put either a repeal of the new LGBT-affirmative law or a (constitutional or statutory) ban on LGBT-affirmative activities or relationships, and often rely upon a core religious constituency in order to drive the advocacy for such a referendum.

In the United States, civil rights referendums were held in the latter 1900s in order to prohibit same-sex unions (including marriage) and repeal amendments to human rights ordinances which included sexual orientations and gender identities as protected classes. The climax of such legislation was the passage of a record number of U.S. state constitutional amendments banning same-sex unions by referendum in 2004, which coincided with a large turnout for the re-election of George W. Bush to the presidency and Republican legislators to control of both houses of Congress.

Among those who advocate for LGBT rights, the delegation of marriage and other rights to the "will of the people" has propelled the notion of preventing civil rights-related laws and proposals from going to the ballot. This notion was underscored in the aftermath of the passage of California Proposition 8 in California.

=== Race relations ===
In a 2000 Alabama referendum on repealing the 1901 state constitutional ban on interracial marriage, over 40% of the participating electorate voted against repealing the ban, which had been rendered unenforceable following Loving v. Virginia. In 1998, South Carolina voters voted 61.95%–38.05% in favor of repealing their own constitutional ban. Harvard University professor Werner Sollors intimated that the laws took so long after Loving to be repealed because of the complex clauses which required large majorities in order to repeal them.

On January 26, 2012, in remarks accompanying his decision to veto the legalization of same-sex marriage by the State Legislature and call for a referendum on the matter, New Jersey governor Chris Christie remarked that "The fact of the matter is, I think people would have been happy to have a referendum on civil rights rather than fighting and dying in the streets in the South. It was our political institutions that were holding things back." He was strongly criticized by politicians and activists of both African-American and other ancestries from both inside and outside of New Jersey, with Newark mayor Cory Booker stating "...dear God, we should not put civil rights issues to a popular vote to be subject to the sentiments and passions of the day. No minority should have their civil rights subject to the passions and sentiments of the majority." Christie initially criticized the response of many legislators as a Democratic partisan ploy, but walked back his comments by apologizing for offense on February 1 while continuing to back his call for a referendum.

=== Women's suffrage ===
Women's suffrage was first brought forward as proposed legislation in the Kansas women's suffrage referendum, 1867. The proposal was defeated twice before passing.
