= 2022 Ohio Issue 1 =

Issue 1
- November 8, 2022
- Determining Bail Amount Based on Public Safety Amendment

Results
Choice	Votes	%
Yes	3,107,629	77.50%
No	901,997	22.50%
Valid votes	4,009,626	95.44%
Invalid or blank votes	191,742	4.56%
Total votes	4,201,368	100.00%
Registered voters/turnout	8,029,950	52.32%

Yes
90–100%
80–90%
70–80%
60–70%
50–60%
No
90–100%
60–70%
50–60%
Other
Tie
No votes

Issue 1, the Determining Bail Amount Based on Public Safety Amendment, was a successful ballot measure on the November 2022 general election ballot in Ohio. It added language to the Constitution of Ohio to require consideration of public safety in the setting of bail amounts, and transferred responsibility for establishing bail procedures from the Ohio Supreme Court to the Ohio Legislature.

The measure was conceived as a response to a January 2022 Ohio Supreme Court ruling that using excessive bail amounts to prevent pretrial release was unconstitutional. It also ruled that public safety could not be considered in setting amounts of bail, but left in place existing mechanisms to deny bail outright for public safety reasons, as well as non-financial mechanisms for protecting public safety.

Supporters of the measure said that it would make it easier to detain defendants for public safety reasons than then-current mechanisms allowed. Opponents called the measure unnecessary and ineffective, as its public safety provision largely duplicated existing state law, and noted the availability of other mechanisms to protect public safety. They also stated that it would disproportionately impact poorer defendants while allowing wealthier defendants to be freed.

Supporters also criticized the Ohio Supreme Court for overturning established practice, and desired giving the Ohio Legislature more flexibility to intervene in setting bail procedures. Opponents criticized the transfer of power from the courts to lawmakers.

== Legislative background ==
Bail is governed by Article I, Section 9 of the Constitution of Ohio, which states that bail is not granted "where the proof is evident or the presumption great" for a capital offense or "where the person poses a substantial risk of serious physical harm to any person or to the community." In the latter case, the Ohio Legislature fixes standards to determine who falls into that category.

Article I, Section 9 of the Ohio Constitution also gave the Supreme Court of Ohio responsibility to adopt procedures for establishing the amount and conditions of bail. It also states that "Excessive bail shall not be required." Under state law, Section 2937.23(A)(3) of the Ohio Revised Code requires that:

In all cases, the bail shall be fixed with consideration of the seriousness of the offense charged, the previous criminal record of the defendant, and the probability of the defendant appearing at the trial of the case.

Upon passage, Ohio Issue 1 removed Ohio Supreme Court's role in establishing bail procedures, and added the following sentence to Article I, Section 9 of the Ohio Constitution:

When determining the amount of bail, the court shall consider public safety, including the seriousness of the offense, and a person's criminal record, the likelihood a person will return to court, and any other factor the general assembly may prescribe.

== History ==
The ballot was a response to a 4–3 Ohio Supreme Court ruling in DuBose v. McGuffey, decided on January 4, 2022, that a $1.5 million bail was unconstitutionally excessive for charges relating to a fatal shooting during a robbery, upholding a lower court ruling to reduce it to $500,000. The court stated that "public safety, although of the utmost importance, is not a factor relevant to the calculation of the bail amount," noting that it would have been permissible to deny bail outright, and that public safety could be addressed through non-financial mechanisms such as travel restrictions or restraining orders.

After the ruling, there was an apparent increase in the use of hearings to deny bail outright, rather than setting high bail amounts, in and around Hamilton County.

The ruling spurred efforts to overturn it by Ohio Attorney General Dave Yost (R) and Hamilton County Prosecuting Attorney Joe Deters (R). The ballot was a legislative referral introduced on March 28, 2022, by Representatives Jeff LaRe (R) and D. J. Swearingen (R). The Ohio House of Representatives passed it 63–33 on May 25, 2022, and the Ohio Senate passed it 25–7 on June 1, 2022.

== Campaign ==
=== Support ===
Passage of the issue was supported by both major candidates in the 2022 Ohio gubernatorial election, incumbent Governor Mike DeWine (R) and former Dayton Mayor Nan Whaley (D). Of the 2022 Ohio Senate election candidates, JD Vance (R) supported passage, while Tim Ryan (D) was reported to be undecided. Ohio Attorney General Dave Yost supported passage, and said "the presumption of innocence in court does not equal, it is not the same as pretending that a career criminal poses no threat on the streets."

The three dissenting Ohio Supreme Court justices participated in a bus tour to campaign for its passage. Justice Patrick F. Fischer criticized the change to what he called a long-standing precedent that judges could consider public safety when setting bond, and Justice Pat DeWine stated that under the current system it was difficult for judges to deny bail for public safety reasons due to the standards of proof required. The Fraternal Order of Police of Ohio and the Ohio Prosecuting Attorneys Association supported passage; a spokesperson from the former stated that "it does give the General Assembly some flexibility to intercede if they are confronted with a large group of activist judges who are acting on their own and not in the spirit of the law and what the people of the state of Ohio want."

=== Opposition ===
Arguments against passage included that state law already provided a mechanism to deny bail outright to dangerous defendants, given that the Ohio Supreme Court ruling only applied to the amount of cash bail when it is granted. Additionally, other non-financial mechanisms were available to promote public safety including home confinement and ankle monitoring. Legal experts have stated that state law continued to allow judges to consider public safety when setting bail. Other arguments include that individual determination is more effective than cash bail, that passage of the issue would undermine due process rights and the presumption of innocence, and that the transfer of power from the Ohio Supreme Court to lawmakers would be unwarranted.

Opposition to passage came from Democratic legislators and bail reform advocates, on the basis that cash bail disproportionately impacts poorer defendants and allows wealthier defendants to be freed. The Ohio American Civil Liberties Union opposed passage, calling it "unnecessary and deeply misguided." The Cleveland newspaper The Plain Dealer published an editorial opposing passage.

=== Polling ===
Polling generally showed large margins in favor of passage.

== Results ==
Issue 1
Choice	Votes	%
For	3,107,629	77.50
Against	901,997	22.50
Total	4,009,626	100.00
Valid votes	4,009,626	95.44
Invalid/blank votes	191,742	4.56
Total votes	4,201,368	100.00
Registered voters/turnout	8,029,950	52.32
Source: Ohio Secretary of State
