= 2022 Tennessee Amendment 1 =

Tennessee Ballot Measure

Amendment 1
- November 8, 2022
- Shall Article XI of the Constitution of Tennessee be amended by adding the following language as a new section? "It is unlawful for any person, corporation, association, or this state or its political subdivisions to deny or attempt to deny employment to any person by reason of the person's membership in, affiliation with, resignation from, or refusal to join or affiliate with any labor union or employee organization."

Results
Choice	Votes	%
Yes	1,141,941	69.79%
No	494,239	30.21%
Valid votes	1,636,180	100.00%
Invalid or blank votes	0	0.00%
Total votes	1,636,180	100.00%
- County results Yes 70–80% 60–70% 50–60%

The Tennessee Constitutional Amendment: 1, commonly known as Amendment 1 or The Right-to-Work Amendment, is an approved legislatively referred constitutional amendment to the Constitution of Tennessee that appeared on November 8, 2022. The amendment adds language to the constitution to prohibit workplaces from requiring mandatory labor union membership for employees as a condition for employment. The U.S. state of Tennessee has been a right-to-work state by statute since 1947. However, this referendum makes the law a right and amendment written into the state's constitution.

Every county in the state voted in favor of this amendment, with "Yes" getting almost 70% of the vote.

== Content ==
The proposal adds this language to Article XI of the Constitution of Tennessee as follows:

§ 3

"It is unlawful for any person, corporation, association, or this state or its political subdivisions to deny or attempt to deny employment to any person by reason of the person's membership in, affiliation with, resignation from, or refusal to join or affiliate with any labor union or employee organization."

The Tennessee Secretary of State's official summary of the amendment on the ballot for November 8, 2022, is as follows:

"This amendment would add a new section to article XI of the Tennessee Constitution to make it illegal for any person, corporation, association, or the State of Tennessee or its political subdivisions to deny or attempt to deny employment to any person because of the person’s membership in, affiliation with, resignation from, or refusal to join or affiliate with any labor union or employee organization."

The Tennessee Secretary of State's official title of the amendment on the ballot for November 8, 2022, is as follows:

"Shall Article XI of the Constitution of Tennessee be amended by adding the following language as a new section?

'It is unlawful for any person, corporation, association, or this state or its political subdivisions to deny or attempt to deny employment to any person by reason of the person’s membership in, affiliation with, resignation from, or refusal to join or affiliate with any labor union or employee organization.'"

A vote for Amendment 1 supports amending the state constitution to add a new section to make it illegal for workplaces to require mandatory labor union membership for employees as a condition for employment.

A vote against Amendment 1 opposes this amendment, while maintaining a similar right-to-work law in state statutes.

== Supporters ==
Many Tennessee politicians, the majority being Republican members of the House and the Senate, voiced their support for the amendment. The sponsor of the amendment in the State Senate, Brian Kelsey, said, "The Tennessee right-to-work law states that workers cannot be hired or fired, or in any way discriminated against based on whether or not they are a member of a union. I think that this right is an important enough civil right that it belongs in our state constitution."

The two most recent Governors of Tennessee, Bill Lee and Bill Haslam were members of the committee that supported Amendment 1, which was known as "Yes on 1". The incumbent governor, Lee, was the statewide chairman of the committee, while Haslam, the Governor of Tennessee from 2011-2019, was the treasurer.

Along with politicians, multiple organizations, such as the National Federation of Independent Businesses' Tennessee chapter and the Tennessee Chamber of Commerce, endorsed "Yes on 1".

== Opponents ==
When the amendment was taken upon a vote in the Tennessee General Assembly, it was mostly along party lines, with the exception of a Republican Todd Gardenhire in the Senate, and Scotty Campbell in the House voting "no." However, the majority of those who voted against the bill in the General Assembly were Democrats.

The AFL–CIO federation of unions, and Democratic candidate for governor Jason Martin, oppose the bill as well. One of the members of the opposition, Senator Sara Kyle, said, "Right-to-work is a false slogan. The true effect of this legislation is to destroy the freedom and power of collective bargaining. Collective bargaining has lifted millions of workers out of poverty and provided families with health care and dignity in retirement. That gives big corporations the upper hand."

The official committee in opposition to Amendment 1 was "No on 1: Tennessee for All."

== Endorsements ==
Vote Yes on 1

State officials

- Bill Lee (R), Governor of Tennessee (2019-present)
- Randy McNally (R), Lieutenant Governor of Tennessee (2017-present)
- Brian Kelsey (R), member of the Tennessee Senate, from the 31st district (2009-2022)
- Cameron Sexton (R), Speaker of the Tennessee House of Representatives (2019-present)
- William Lamberth (R), Majority Leader of the Tennessee House of Representatives (2019-present)

Former state officials

- Bill Haslam (R), former Governor of Tennessee (2011-2019)

Organizations

- National Federation of Independent Business - Tennessee
- Tennessee Chamber of Commerce

== Polling ==
Poll source	Date(s) administered	Sample size	Margin of error	For Amendment 1	Against Amendment 1	Undecided
RABA Research	October 20–21, 2022	549 (LV)	± 4.2%	44%	19%	

== See also ==
- 2022 Tennessee elections
