= Constitution of Tennessee =

American state constitution

Constitution of the State of Tennessee
- The Seal of Tennessee

Overview
- Jurisdiction: Tennessee
- Subordinate to: Constitution of the United States
- Created: February 23, 1870
- Ratified: March 26, 1870

Government structure
- Branches: 3
- Chambers: Bicameral
- Executive: Governor of Tennessee
- Judiciary: Judiciary of Tennessee

Full text
- Constitution of the State of Tennessee at Wikisource

The Constitution of the State of Tennessee defines the form, structure, activities, character, and fundamental rules (and means for changing them) of the U.S. state of Tennessee.

The original constitution of Tennessee came into effect on June 1, 1796, concurrent with the state's admission to the Union. A second version of the constitution was adopted in 1835. A third constitution was adopted in 1870 and is the one still in use today, with subsequent amendments. The constitution is located in Tennessee's State Library and Archives.

== History ==
=== 1796 constitution ===
Tennessee held a convention in 1796 to frame their first constitution. The original Tennessee state constitution was not submitted to the voters for approval, but it was approved by US Congress, in conjunction with the resolution admitting Tennessee as a state. It went into effect on June 1, 1796, when Tennessee entered the Union.

The first constitution was widely criticized as giving the executive, presumably a full-time governor, insufficient authority, and investing too much authority in the legislature a part-time body. That was cited as a primary reason for its replacement.

The 1796 constitution also did not create a state supreme court, providing only for "such superior and inferior courts" as the legislature should create, with judges elected by the legislature for indefinite terms.

In spite of its shortcomings, the original document had its admirers. Thomas Jefferson described Tennessee's as the "least imperfect and most republican of the state constitutions."

=== 1835 constitution ===
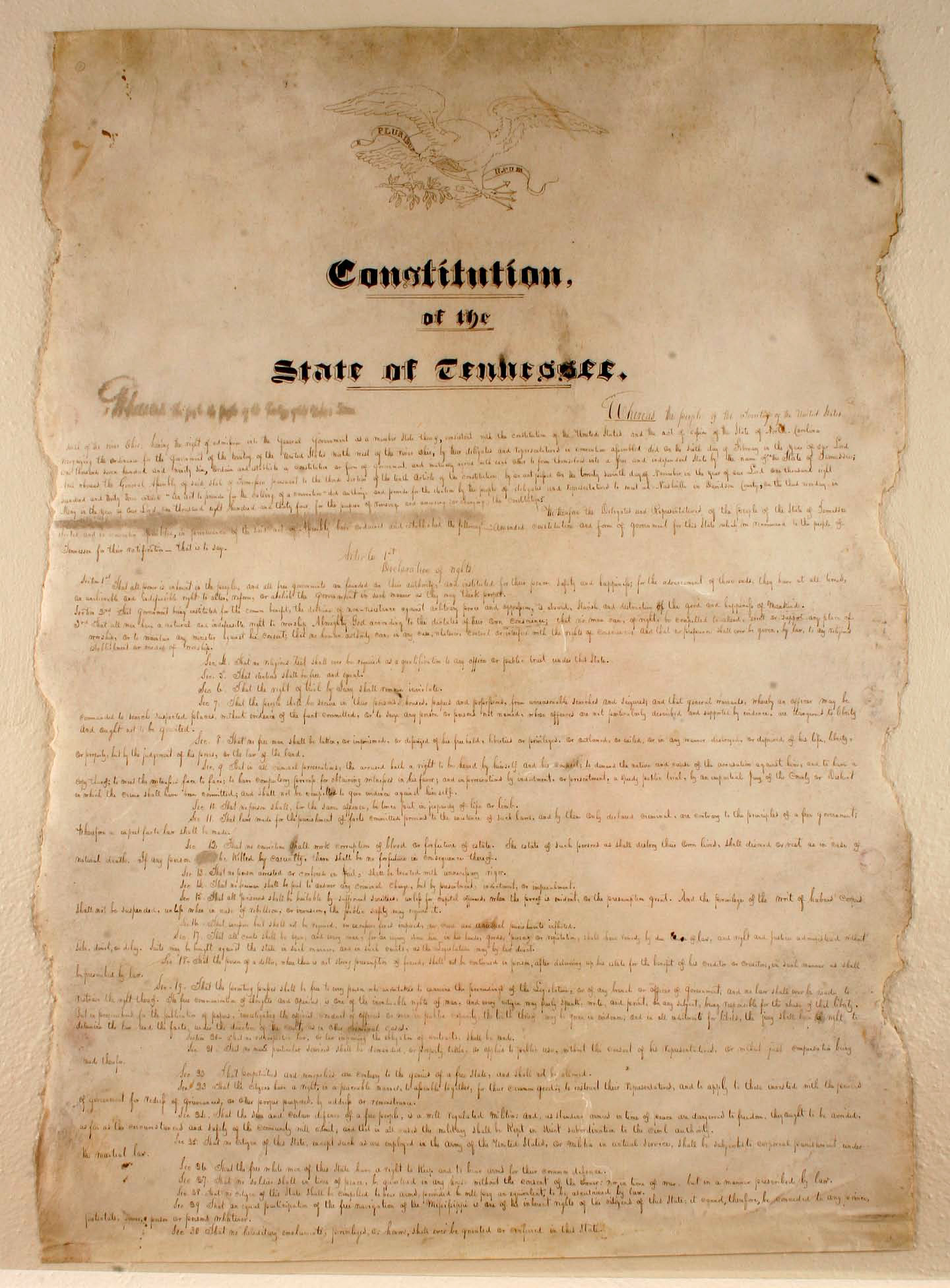
The second version of the Tennessee State Constitution was adopted in 1835.

The second Tennessee State Constitution, adopted in 1835, resulted from a state constitutional convention that convened in Nashville on May 19, 1834, with 60 delegates in attendance. William Carter, of Carter County, presided over the 1834 convention.

Antislavery interests petitioned the convention to abolish slavery, which was rejected by the convention delegates. The constitution adopted increased opportunities for citizens to engage in the political process, but it limited suffrage to white males. Similarly to other southern states, such as Virginia, it disfranchised free black men, who had had the right to vote under the 1796 constitution. That followed fears raised by Nat Turner's Rebellion in 1831.

The second constitution provided for a state supreme court, with three judges, with one judge from each grand division of the state. Judges were required to be at least 35 years old and would serve 12-year terms.

The constitution was ratified by voters in March 1835, receiving 42,666 votes for it and 17,691 against it.

=== 1870 constitution ===
The Tennessee General Assembly, on November 15, 1869, called for an election to be held in December 1869 for two purposes: to determine if a constitutional convention should be called to amend or replace the 1835 constitution and to elect delegates to that convention if the voters determined that it was to be held. The voters decided for the convention, which began on January 10, 1870. The convention adjourned on February 23, 1870, after adopting the constitution and recommending its approval by the voters in a special election, which was conducted on March 26, 1870.

The third document was largely written as a response to the requirement for all ex-Confederates to adopt new constitutions explicitly banning slavery. It contains many provisions that are verbatim holdovers from the two predecessor documents. It is considerably longer than the federal constitution but is not particularly long by the standards of state constitutions. This 1870 document stood unamended until 1953, which, according to the Tennessee Blue Book, was the longest period that any such document had remained in effect without amendment anywhere in the world.

Tennessee held limited constitutional conventions in 1953, 1959, 1965, 1971, and 1977.

== Main provisions ==
The constitution's preamble is much longer than its counterpart in the federal Constitution. Much of that length is devoted to justifying the authority behind the new constitution: that the new constitution was created under the authority of the constitution of 1835, which was itself created under the authority of the 1796 convention.

=== Declaration of Rights ===
Article I, is Tennessee's bill of rights. It mimics many of the US Bill of Rights, but the provisions describing them are generally much lengthier. The provisions in this article state:

ARTICLE I. Declaration of Rights.

Section 1. That all power is inherent in the people, and all free governments are founded on their authority, and instituted for their peace, safety, and happiness; for the advancement of those ends they have at all times, an unalienable and indefeasible right to alter, reform, or abolish the government in such manner as they may think proper.

Section 2. That government being instituted for the common benefit, the doctrine of nonresistance against arbitrary power and oppression is absurd, slavish, and destructive of the good and happiness of mankind.

Section 3. That all men have a natural and indefeasible right to worship Almighty God according to the dictates of their own conscience; that no man can of right be compelled to attend, erect, or support any place of worship or to maintain any minister against his consent; that no human authority can, in any case whatever, control or interfere with the rights of conscience; and that no preference shall ever be given, by law, to any religious establishment or mode of worship.

Section 4. That no political or religious test, other than an oath to support the Constitution of the United States and of this state, shall ever be required as a qualification to any office or public trust under this state.

Section 5. The elections shall be free and equal, and the right of suffrage, as hereinafter declared, shall never be denied to any person entitled thereto, except upon a conviction by a jury of some infamous crime, previously ascertained and declared by law, and judgment thereon by court of competent jurisdiction.

Section 6. That the right of trial by jury shall remain inviolate, and no religious or political test shall ever be required as a qualification for jurors.

Section 7. That the people shall be secure in their persons, houses, papers and possessions, from unreasonable searches and seizures; and that general warrants, whereby an officer may be commanded to search suspected places, without evidence of the fact committed, or to seize any person or persons not named, whose offences are not particularly described and supported by evidence, are dangerous to liberty, and ought not be granted.

Section 8. That no man shall be taken or imprisoned, or disseized of his freehold, liberties or privileges, or outlawed, or exiled, or in any manner destroyed or deprived of his life, liberty, or property, but by the judgment of his peers, or the law of the land.

Section 9. That in all criminal prosecutions, the accused hath the right to be heard by himself and his counsel; to demand the nature and cause of the accusation against him, and to have a copy thereof, to meet the witnesses face to face, to have compulsory process for obtaining witnesses in his favor and in prosecutions by indictment or presentment, a speedy public trial, by an impartial jury of the county in which the crime shall have been committed and shall not be compelled to give evidence against himself.

Section 10. That no person shall, for the same offense, be twice put in jeopardy of life or limb.

Section 11. That laws made for the punishment of acts committed previous to the existence of such laws, and by them only declared criminal, are contrary to the principles of a free government; wherefore no ex post facto law shall be made.

Section 12. That no conviction shall work corruption of blood or forfeiture of estate. The estate of such persons as shall destroy their own lives shall descend or vest as in case of natural death. If any person is killed by casualty, there shall be no forfeiture in consequence thereof.

Section 13. That no person arrested and confined in jail shall be treated with unnecessary rigor.

Section 14. That no person shall be put to answer any criminal charge but by presentment, indictment, or impeachment.

Section 15. That all prisoners shall be bailable by sufficient sureties, unless for capital offenses, when the proof is evident, or the presumption is great. And the privilege of the writ of Habeas Corpus shall not be suspended unless when in case of rebellion or invasion, the General Assembly shall declare that public safety requires it.

Section 16. That excessive bail shall not be required, nor excessive fines imposed, nor cruel and unusual punishments inflicted.

Section 17. That all courts shall be open; and every man, for an injury done him in his lands, goods, person or reputation, shall have remedy by due course of law, and right and justice administered without sale, denial, or delay. Suits may be brought against the state in such manner and in such courts as the Legislature may by law direct.

Section 18. The Legislature shall pass no law authorizing imprisonment for debt in civil cases.

Section 19. That the printing press shall be free to every person to examine the proceedings of the Legislature; or of any branch or officer of the government, and no law shall ever be made to restrain the right thereof. The free communication of thoughts and opinions, is one of the invaluable rights of man, and every citizen may freely speak, write, and print on any subject, being responsible for the abuse of that liberty. But in prosecutions for the publication of papers investigating the official conduct of officers, or men in public capacity, the truth thereof may be given in evidence; and in all indictments for libel, the jury shall have a right to determine the law and the facts, under the direction of the court, as in other criminal cases.

Section 20. That no retrospective law, or law impairing the obligations of contracts, shall be made.

Section 21. That no man's particular services shall be demanded, or property taken, or applied to public use, without the consent of his representatives, or without just compensation being made, therefore.

Section 22. That perpetuities and monopolies are contrary to the genius of a free state, and shall not be allowed.

Section 23. That the citizens have a right, in a peaceable manner, to assemble together for their common good, to instruct their representatives, and to apply to those invested with the powers of government for redress of grievances or other proper purposes, by address or remonstrance.

Section 24. That sure and certain defense of a free people is a well regulated militia; and, as standing armies in time of peace are dangerous to freedom, they ought to be avoided as far as the circumstances and safety of the community will admit; and that in all cases, the military shall be kept in strict subordination to the civil authority.

Section 25. That no citizen of this state, except such as are employed in the army of the United States, or militia in actual service, shall be subjected to punishment under the martial or military law. That martial law, in the sense of the unrestricted power of military officers, or others, to dispose of the persons, liberties, or property of the citizen, is inconsistent with the principles of free government, and is not confided to any department of the government of this state.

Section 26. That the citizens of this state have a right to keep and to bear arms for their common defense; but the Legislature shall have power, by law, to regulate the wearing of arms with a view to prevent crime.

Section 27. That no soldier shall, in time of peace, be quartered in any house without the consent of the owner; nor in time of war, but in a manner prescribed by law.

Section 28. That no citizen of this state be compelled to bear arms, provided he will pay an equivalent, to be ascertained by law.

Section 29. That an equal participation in the free navigation of the Mississippi is one of the inherent rights of the citizens of this state; it can not, therefore, be conceded to any prince, potentate, power, person, or persons whatever.

Section 30. That no hereditary emoluments, privileges, or honors, shall ever be granted or conferred in this state.

Section 31. That the limits and boundaries of this state be ascertained, it is declared they are as hereafter mentioned, that is to say: Beginning on the extreme height of the Stone Mountain, at the place where the line of Virginia intersects it, in latitude thirty-six degrees and thirty minutes north; running thence along the extreme height of the said mountain, to the place where Watauga River breaks through it; thence a direct course to the top of the Yellow Mountain, where Bright's road crosses the same; thence along the ridge of said mountain, between the waters of Doe river and the waters of Rock Creek, to the place where the road crosses the Iron Mountain; from thence along the extreme height of said mountain, to the place where Nolichucky River runs through the same; thence to the top of the Bald Mountain; thence along the extreme height of said mountain to the Painted Rock on French Broad river; thence along the highest ridge of said mountain, to the place where it is called the Great Iron or Smoky Mountain; thence along the extreme height of said mountain to the place where it is called Unicoi or Unaka Mountain, between the Indian towns of Cowee and Old Chota; thence along the main ridge of the said mountain to the southern boundary of this state, as described in the act of cession of North Carolina to the United States of America and that all the territory, lands and waters lying west of said line, as before mentioned, and contained within the chartered limits of the state of North Carolina are within the boundaries and limits of this state, over which the people have the right to exercise sovereignty and the right of soil, so far as is consistent with the Constitution of the United States, recognizing the Articles of Confederation, the Bill of Rights and Constitution of North Carolina, the cession act of the said state, and the ordinance of Congress for the government of the territory north west of Ohio; provided, nothing herein contained shall extend to affect the claim or claims of individuals to any part of the soil, which is recognized to them by the aforesaid cession act; And provided also, that the limits and jurisdiction of this state shall extend to any other land and territory now acquired, or that may hereafter be acquired, by compact or agreement with other states, or otherwise, although such land and territory are not included within the boundaries herein before designated.

Section 32. That the erection of safe prisons, the inspection of prisons, and the humane treatment of prisoners, shall be provided for.

Section 33. That slavery and involuntary servitude, except as a punishment for crime, whereof the party shall have been duly convicted, are forever prohibited in this state.

Section 34. The General Assembly shall make no law recognizing the right of property in man.

Section 35. To preserve and protect the rights of victims of crime to justice and due process, victims shall be entitled to the following basic rights: (a) The right to confer with the prosecution. (b) The right to be free from intimidation, harassment and abuse throughout the criminal justice system. (c) The right to be present at all proceedings where the defendant has the right to be present. (d) The right to be heard, when relevant, at all critical stages of the criminal justice process as defined by the General Assembly. (e) The right to be informed of all proceedings and of the release, transfer, or escape of the accused or convicted person. (f) The right to a speedy trial or disposition and a prompt and final conclusion of the case after the conviction or sentence. (g) The right to restitution from the offender. (h) The right to be informed of each of the rights established for victims. The General Assembly has the authority to enact substantive and procedural laws to define, implement, preserve, and protect the rights guaranteed to victims by this section.

Section 36. Nothing in this Constitution secures or protects a right to abortion or requires the funding of an abortion. The people retain the right through their elected state representatives and state senators to enact, amend, or repeal statutes regarding abortion, including, but not limited to, circumstances of pregnancy resulting from rape or incest or when necessary to save the life of the mother.

Sections 16 and 27 are among those directly copied from the federal Constitution. Section 8 closely follows the wording of the Magna Carta.

The article's provisions regarding slavery are also significant, as they both prohibit slavery in the same manner as the Thirteenth Amendment to the United States Constitution and forbid the legislature from making any "law recognizing the right of property in man." Some construe the latter provision as prohibiting any form of indentured servitude.

==== Less usual declarations ====
Besides the more common rights, a few other rights are enumerated:

- Citizens are granted "an unalienable and indefeasible right to alter, reform, or abolish the government in such manner as they may think proper" (Section 1).
- Imprisonment for civil debt may not be carried out (Section 18).
- Martial law may never be declared (Section 25)
- Anyone may travel on the Mississippi River, and the right to do so may not be sold to or barred from anyone (Section 29).

=== Separation of powers ===
Section 2. Article II of the constitution reads that the powers of the government shall be divided into three distinct departments: legislative, executive, and judicial. It is explicit that: No person or persons belonging to one of these departments shall exercise any of the powers properly belonging to either of the others, something considered implicit in the federal constitution or inferred by its interpreters (Sections 1 and 2).

==== Legislative branch ====
The lawmaking power of the state is given to its Legislature, named the General Assembly. The upper house is the Senate and the lower house is the House of Representatives (Section 3).

The basis for legislative representation is population, as determined by the US Census; however the General Assembly can always use other, non-population factors to apportion one house (the Senate) unless the US Constitution is currently authoritatively interpreted to forbid that, as it currently is under Reynolds v. Sims (Section 4).

The lower house is fixed at 99 members, which are to be divided up among counties; if one county has more than one representative (which is guaranteed to happen, as there are 95 counties), the affected counties shall be divided up into districts, causing all representatives to be elected from single-member constituencies. A county may not be split into separate counties to do that (Section 5 and subsection).

The upper house is to be set up in the same manner, but its size is variable, up to a third of the size of the lower house, which was fixed at 99, as noted above. In practice, the Tennessee Senate always had 33 members, the maximum allowed (Section 6 and subsection).

The first election to the Legislature was to take place on the second Tuesday of November 1870 and then every two years, on the first Tuesday after the first Monday, and all such elections shall take place only on that day (Section 7).

Representatives have to be 21 years old, US citizens, state citizens for three years, and county citizens for at least one year before election day (Section 9). Senatorial requirements are different only in that senators must be at least 30 years old. Also, no one from either house may be appointed to any office by the executive or legislative branches unless it is as a "trustee of a literary institution" (Section 10).

Both houses may imprison people (whether a member or not) who disrupts their proceedings (Section 14).

The legislative provisions include the requirement that no bill may be broader than its caption, and it may have only one subject (Section 17). Tennessee courts have interpreted that to mean that no bill can contain non-germane material, and no caption can include the words "and for other purposes" (unlike in Congress). The General Assembly, therefore, can pass no "omnibus" bills.

Also banned were some business practices that had previously gotten the state into trouble, such as allowing municipalities to lend money to railroads for them to pay off bonds on which they had previously defaulted (Section 33) and the election or appointment of people who were still responsible for public money (Section 25).

Section 28 describes the General Assembly's power to levy taxes.

For a municipality to issue bonds or borrow money on behalf of a private business or individual, the passage of a referendum was required, with the unusually stringent provision of a three-quarters majority, but that was to be delayed for ten years in 26 named counties, where the requirement would be a simple majority until then. The period between May 6, 1861 and January 1, 1867 was not to be counted against any statute of limitations, as civil government in much of the state had broken down during that period because of the American Civil War.

==== Executive branch ====
Article III allows the governor to serve a two-year term, which was superseded by 1953 amendments. The executive branch is empowered with a line-item veto, but a majority of all members in each house may override the veto, which is the same vote required to enact the bill initially. The governor is the head of the state militia, but he may not exercise that power unless the General Assembly authorizes him to do so when "the public safety requires it" (Section 5).

There are twenty-two departments that operate under the executive branch; the departments are:

- Department of Agriculture
- Department of Children's Services
- Department of Commerce and Insurance
- Department of Correction
- Department of Economic and Community Development
- Department of Education
- Department of Environment and Conservation
- Department of Finance and Administration
- Department of Financial Institutions
- Department of General Services
- Department of Health
- Department of Human Resources
- Department of Human Services
- Department of Intellectual and Developmental Disabilities
- Department of Labor and Workforce Development
- Department of Mental Health and Substance Abuse Services
- Department of Military
- Department of Revenue
- Department of Safety and Homeland Security
- Department of Tourist Development
- Department of Transportation
- Department of Veterans Services

==== Judicial branch ====
Article VI creates the judiciary, with the Tennessee Supreme Court, the Chancery courts, and others to be "ordained and established" as deemed necessary as well as justices of the peace (Section 1).

The Tennessee Supreme Court is to meet in Nashville, Knoxville, and Jackson. Only two of its five members may be from any one of the state's Grand Divisions (East Tennessee, Middle Tennessee, and West Tennessee) (Section 2). The courts were elected by the people for eight years at a time (Sections 3 and 4), but that has been changed to the Tennessee Plan.

The court then appoints the state "Attorney General and Reporter" for an eight-year term (Section 5).

The General Assembly may remove judges and state attorneys with a two-thirds supermajority of the constitutionally authorized membership in both houses, with each vote for and against being recorded along with the individual reason for his decision. Removal will lie for either official or personal misconduct. The judge or attorney subject to removal must be notified ten days before such a vote (Section 6).

Alternatively, judges and state attorneys may be impeached by a simple majority vote of a quorum of the General Assembly for crimes or misconduct committed solely in their official capacity. Then, the lower house appoints three members to prosecute the impeached, and the senate, presided over by the Chief Justice of the Tennessee Supreme Court, convenes to try the impeached. Conviction requires only a two-thirds supermajority of the number of senators "sworn to try the impeachment," which may be less than a "constitutional" supermajority (Article V).

Judges are also barred from hearing cases of impeachment. Criminal charges after removal from office would result only from a separate trial of fact in the state's ordinary courts.

== Other provisions ==
The constitution has several provisions that are unusual for a state constitution. It mandates only three constitutional officers other than governor: the secretary of state, state treasurer, and comptroller, who are elected by the General Assembly, not the voters as is far more common. Tennessee is the only state other than Hawaii and, arguably, New Jersey in which the governor is the sole office holder elected statewide (the Lieutenant Governor of New Jersey is elected as part of a ticket alongside the governor).

The governor's designated successor is the Speaker of the Tennessee State Senate, elected from among its membership, a provision now found in the constitutions of only a few other states; most now have a full-time lieutenant governor. (The office is referred to as Lieutenant Governor of Tennessee in subsequent statutory law, but not in the constitution.)

General elections for state offices were moved to make them simultaneous with federal elections (November in even-numbered years), with elections for county and judicial offices to be held in August of even-numbered years; that later became the traditional date for primary elections for the statewide offices to be held as well so that the day on which, for example, a sheriff was elected would be the same day as the primary election for governor would be held.

Other provisions included are the procedure for the establishment of new counties and the recognition of three counties previously established by the legislature, in contravention of provisions of the previous constitution. New counties would carry a pro-rata share of the indebtedness of the county or counties from which they were being formed, preventing the formation of new counties as a way of areas getting out from under debt that they had previously incurred.

(That provision nonetheless incited a spate of new counties; ten were established in the next decade, but none have been since, and one of those established was subsequently abolished, and the provisions are such that would make the establishment of any further counties beyond those extremely difficult and unlikely.)

Some current agendas of the era were reflected, as there were provisions allowing county seats to be moved in two counties with only a majority vote of the populace, but a two-thirds majority was required in all others. A county line adjustment between two counties was made between two existing counties, and special provisions made for counties whose formation was already planned at the time as well as for settling definitively the status of others that had already been created without strict adherence to the provisions for the creation of new counties contained in the previous constitution.

There were also provisions forbidding interracial marriages and integrated schools, allowing for a poll tax, preventing interest over 10% from being charged on loans and making this usury per se. All four provisions have been either subsequently formally removed or otherwise invalidated by Supreme Court of the United States decisions and are no longer enforced. Whether the prohibition of former duelists from holding office is valid has apparently not been tested.

=== Militia ===
The state's militia is governed by Article VIII, which specifies that all officers are to be elected by those subject to service within their groupings and as the legislature directs (Section 1) but that the governor will appoint his staff officers, who, in turn, appoints their staff officers (Section 2). The legislature is also directed to exempt religious conscientious objectors (Section 3).

=== Disqualifications ===
Article IX lists three groups of people who are barred from various privileges:

- Ministers of any religion may not sit as legislators because they "ought not be diverted from the great duties of their functions" (Section 1).
- Atheists may not perform any office in the government, but Section 4 of Article I, banning any religious test for any "office of public trust", would make this impossible to enforce (Section 2).
- Any person involved in a duel may not hold any "honor or profit" under the state's government and is liable to be punished otherwise (Section 3).

The restrictions on ministers and atheists have been deemed to be unenforceable due to the interpretations of the Supreme Court of the United States with regard to the First and the Fourteenth Amendments to the United States Constitution.

Impeachment

Article V of the Tennessee Constitution states that only the House of Representatives has the power to impeach (Section 1). Impeachment is when an office holder's actions are called into question, so therefore, they face the chances of being removed from office. The process of impeachment it is tried in the Senate, and all senators must be sworn under oath. The chief justice of the Supreme Court presides overall all trials of impeachment unless he is on trial, then the senior associate judge will rule over the court. The office holder can not be convicted without a two-thirds or majority rule from the Senate (Section 2). The House of Representatives must choose three members to prosecute impeachments. Impeachments can not be tried until the Legislature has adjourned sine die, then the Senate can try the impeachment (Section 3). The governor, Supreme Court Judges, inferior court judges, chancellors, attorneys of the state, treasurer, comptroller, and secretary of state are all liable to impeachment if the House of Representative believe they have committed a crime that calls for disqualification or removal from office, but judgement can only be removal of office and disqualification to hold any office after impeachment. The party must be prosecuted to the full extent of the law, and the Legislature has the power to remove penalties imposed on anyone disqualified from filling office by impeachment (Section 4). Justices of the peace, and other civil officers are also liable for indictments in such courts as the Legislature may direct, and if convicted of impeachment they must be removed from office by said court, and will be subject to other punishment as asserted by law (Section 5).

== Amendment process ==
Article XI, Section 3 of the Tennessee State Constitution gives two methods to amend the document:

=== Legislative method ===
Under the legislative method, which is a lengthy process, the General Assembly must pass a resolution, calling for an amendment and stating its wording, and it must do so in three separate readings on three separate days, with an absolute majority on all readings. The resolution does not require the governor's approval.

The amendment must then be published at least six months before the next legislative election, but it is not then placed on the ballot. Instead, once the legislative election is held, the proposed amendment must go another three readings, a three-day voting process. Then, the amendment requires approval of two-thirds of the legislature on each vote.

Finally, the amendment is placed on the ballot as a referendum, coinciding with the next gubernatorial election. For the amendment to pass, the number of "yes" votes must both be greater than "no" votes and must equal "a majority of all the citizens of the state voting for governor."

=== Convention method ===
Under the convention method, the legislature can put on any ballot the question of whether to call a constitutional convention. The question must state whether the convention is limited (to make amendments to the existing constitution) or unlimited (to propose an entirely new constitution). If the convention is limited, the question must state the provisions of the current constitution that are to be subject to amendment, and the subsequent convention, if approved, is limited to considering only the amendments to the provisions that are specified in the call.

The proposed amendments (or new constitution) must then be placed on the ballot and receive a simple majority.

A constitutional convention may not be held more frequently than once every six years.

== Amendments ==
=== First amendments ===
The record length of time for going unamended ended in 1953. In 1952, the legislature called for a convention, and the voters approved it. Voters then approved the recommended amendments. The most noticeable change in the 1953 amendments was a lengthening of the governor's term from two to four years, but no governor could succeed himself anymore. (Until it was subsequently amended again, in 1978, the provision was to establish what critics derisively called "leapfrog government.")

Another provision allowed for the consolidation of a county government with the government of a county's main city, in the four largest counties.

The convention also established precedents that later proved useful. Since no one who served in the 1870 convention, which wrote the constitution, was still alive, many administrative measures had to be decided, such as what rules the convention would function under temporarily until it was organized and adopted its own permanent rules and how a chair was to be elected.

Also, the constitution was decided to be compiled in a manner similar to statutory law, unlike the federal constitution. Thus, that amendments actually replace the language that they alter in the document, and future publications would have amendments integrated into the text rather than appended to it as "Amendment I," "Amendment II," etc. Thus, someone reading the text of the state constitution can, absent a strong historical background, sometimes be confused as to the provisions that are those of the original document and the ones that are the result of later amendment, but some amendments declare themselves to be such within the text of their provisions.

That does prevent a reader of the current constitution from being confused by encountering obsolete provisions that have since been changed and not reading on to the end of the document to establish that fact, which is sometimes done to the federal constitution by those wishing to obscure its current provisions, such as those who assert that the document considers slaves as three-fifths of a person, which has not applied since the American Civil War but is still in the text of the early part of the document. The amendment changes that are not encountered until much later in the text.

Further amendments to the state constitution were proposed and then adopted at conventions, held in 1959 and 1965. Among the most notable are for the establishment of home rule by counties that chose to adopt a charter so they can function in many ways similar to municipalities.

The amendments also allowed legislators to receive a salary besides expense money and extended the terms of state senators from two years to four, but only half of its membership is elected every two years. Another important change was that the frequency of scheduled sessions of the legislature and thus the budget cycle was altered from biennial to annual, but the General Assembly is still limited to a total of fifteen organizational days and ninety legislative days every two year. Sessions extending that time and special sessions extending beyond twenty legislative days result in the legislature being unable to continue to receive its expense per diem.

The poll tax provisions, already rendered moot, were removed. The 1971 convention, dominated by longtime Tennessee politician Clifford Allen, was limited to the establishment of a new system of property tax assessments.

=== 1977 convention and aftermath ===
The 1977 convention was the broadest call since the original writing of the constitution, in 1870. It was called in part to remove long-unenforceable provisions such as those banning interracial marriage and school desegregation but primarily at the behest of banking interests to remove the 10% cap on interest, which was becoming very problematic in the economic environment of the time. (It had long been circumvented by smaller lenders such as finance companies with tactics such as administration fees, service charges, and payment fees, with tacit legislative approval.)

This convention proved to be very long and contentious and even lasted nearly twice as long as the original one that wrote the 1870 constitution. There were major fights over the adoption of the permanent rules and over who would be the permanent chair. Although that seemed to bode ill, once the convention got on track, it accomplished what many legal scholars see as being a record of largely solid achievement.

A major change was the proposal that the governor could now succeed himself once. A two-term governor was also not barred from any future service in that office in the way that a two-term US President is by the Twenty-second Amendment to the United States Constitution for life, only from a third consecutive term.

Any county and its principal city could vote to consolidate themselves into one "metropolitan government". Only three counties have done so: Nashville and Davidson County; Hartsville and Trousdale County; Lynchburg and Moore County.

Minor other changes included the elimination of the necessity of each county having the archaic (at least for urban counties) offices of constable and cattle ranger. (The provision for rangers was routinely widely ignored; but not the one mandating constables.) The provision limiting sheriffs to three consecutive two-year terms was replaced with one allowing sheriffs an unlimited number of consecutive four-year terms. That provision was called by some wags the "Fate Thomas Amendment", as it seemed to have been passed largely at the behest at the then hugely popular sheriff and political boss of Davidson County, who was otherwise about to be term-limited out of office but achieved re-election under the provisions of the amendment. Eventually, Thomas served federal time for corruption-related offenses.

Some in the mass media derided the convention as having gone out of control, but the primary public reaction was one of apathy. The primary controversy within the convention once it began its actual work, as opposed to its early difficulties, was over a judicial amendment that would have made the state attorney general an office elected by statewide popular vote rather than retaining selection by the Supreme Court, and it would have also eliminated the requirement for the Supreme Court to meet in Knoxville and Jackson, where a new and elaborate building for it had just been completed. Another important provision of the proposed amendment was to repeal the 1870 Constitution's requirement that all judges "shall be elected" in favor of a provision stating that "Justices of the Supreme Court and judges of the Court of Appeals shall be appointed by the Governor from three nominees recommended... by the Appellate Court Nominating Commission.... The name of each justice and judge seeking retention shall be submitted to the qualified voters for retention or rejection... at the expiration of each six year term."

The voters, in a special election held March 7, 1978, solely to ratify the amendments proposed by the convention, voted to remove the archaic provisions and the usury cap and to accept the changes regarding the governor's terms and metropolitan government, but they narrowly turned down the judicial amendment, marking the first time that an amendment put to the voters by a convention had been defeated. Of the 13 proposed amendments, only that one was rejected by the voters.

No further conventions have been held since 1977, but they have been frequently proposed, in part because of the recent spate of state fiscal crises. Some have proposed conventions to determine conclusively whether or not the Tennessee Constitution allows a general, broad-based income tax on wages. It has been suggested by several observers that one reason against the General Assembly requesting future conventions is that they do not desire to create potential new rivals for themselves; as the members themselves cannot be delegates to the convention, in calling for a convention, they are creating a potential new set of politicians campaigning in their same districts and addressing some of the same issues. That occurred to an extent after the 1977 convention, which launched the career, among others, of Memphis attorney Steve Cohen, who was vice president of the convention and later became a prominent progressive Democrat in the Tennessee State Senate, until 2006, when he was elected U.S. Representative from the Ninth District.

=== Recent amendments ===
Beginning in the 1990s, amendments were placed on the ballot without a convention being held, using, for the first time, the provisions that allow the General Assembly to propose amendments directly.

In 1998, voters were asked about two amendments. One was the Victims' Rights Amendment, which required prosecutors to stay in touch with crime victims and their families, to explain to them how purported offenses involving them were to be prosecuted, and to notify them when persons who had committed crimes against them were being scheduled for parole or release, among other provisions. The other amendment removed the word "comfortable" from the requirements for minimum standards for prisons. Both of these amendments passed by overwhelming margins in an election marked by a very light turnout. The amendments represented the first changes to the constitution in 20 years.

In 2002, the legislature again proposed two amendments. The first proposal passed, repealing a constitutional ban on all lotteries. The ban had been a carryover from the 1835 document and was widely regarded as a tribute not only to religious fundamentalism but also to the influence of Andrew Jackson, a known lottery opponent, who was in no way averse to other forms of gambling, especially that regarding horse racing. The amendment established the current state lottery.

The other amendment on the 2002 ballot, pushed for by the Tennessee Municipal League (TML), would have eliminated a constitutional provision that set $50 (a large sum in 1870 when the provision was enacted) as the maximum allowable fine for violation of a municipal ordinance. Instead, it would have allowed the legislature to set limits on the fines that municipalities could enact. However, after putting much effort into getting the legislature to put this amendment onto the ballot, the TML put little effort into winning voter approval, and the proposal was largely overlooked during the public debate over the high-profile lottery amendment. Many voters were unaware of the proposal until they were confronted with it on the ballot and so may have turned it down for that reason. It became the first amendment put forward by the General Assembly to be defeated at the polls; it was, other than the proposed 1978 judicial amendment, the only one ever defeated.

In 2006, two additional amendments to the Tennessee State Constitution were passed. The Tennessee Marriage Protection Amendment specifies that only marriages between a man and a woman can be legally recognized in the state of Tennessee. The amendment was approved by 81% of Tennesseans participating in the vote, which was 30.91% of eligible voters that year. A second amendment, authorizing the legislature to enact legislation allowing counties and municipalities to exempt people over 65 from property tax increases, was approved by 83% of voters.

In 2007, the Tennessee House of Representatives unanimously passed a resolution calling for an amendment to establish the right to hunt, fish, and harvest game "subject to reasonable rules and regulations," but the State Senate did not act on the measure during the 2007 legislative session. The Tennessee Wildlife Resources Agency (TWRA) had raised objections to an earlier version of the measure, which had the backing of the National Rifle Association. The TWRA was concerned that the proposal would prevent it from continuing its regulation of hunting and fishing methods as well as efforts to manage fish and game populations.

In 2010, 90% of voters approved the following: "The citizens of this state shall have the personal right to hunt and fish, subject to reasonable regulations and restrictions prescribed by law. The recognition of this right does not abrogate any private or public property rights, nor does it limit the state's power to regulate commercial activity. Traditional manners and means may be used to take non-threatened species."

In 2014, voters approved this amendment: "Nothing in this Constitution secures or protects a right to abortion or requires the funding of an abortion. The people retain the right through their elected state representatives and state senators to enact, amend, or repeal statues regarding abortion, including, but not limited to, circumstances of pregnancy resulting from rape or incest or when necessary to save the life of the mother." This amendment overturns a 2000 Tennessee Supreme Court ruling, Planned Parenthood v. Sundquist.

Also in 2014, a ban on income tax being levied against earned income (as opposed to interest and dividends, which were still subject to income tax until phased-out in the early 2020s); a change in the judiciary selection/retention process to make the Tennessee Plan explicitly constitutional; and allowing veterans organizations to host gambling fundraisers all passed in 2014.

The 2022 Tennessee Amendment 1, also known as the "Right-to-Work Amendment", is a right-to-work law amendment that was passed in 2022. The amendment added language to the constitution to make it illegal, along as a constitutional right, for workplaces to require mandatory labor union membership for employees as a condition for employment.
