= 2022 Alabama Recompiled Constitution Ratification Question =

Referendum on constitutional reorganization

Recompiled Constitution Ratification Question
- November 8, 2022
- Ratify the Recompiled State Constitution

Results
Choice	Votes	%
Yes	888,456	76.49%
No	273,040	23.51%
Total votes	1,161,496	100.00%

Yes
90–100%
80–90%
70–80%
60–70%
50–60%
No
70–80%
60–70%
50–60%
Other
Tie
No votes

Alabama Recompiled Constitution Ratification Question was held to amend the Constitution of Alabama, replacing it with a more modern version drafted to achieve the following:

- properly arrange the document;
- remove the racist language, such a ban on interracial marriage and school segregation;
- delete self-repeating and repealed provisions, including a section that limited suffrage to men;
- do away with slavery and involuntary servitude, even as a punishment for a crime;
- consolidate provisions concerning economic development;
- arrange the local provisions based on the county of application.

== Background ==
Alabama's previous Constitution was established with the explicit purpose of establishing white supremacy in the state. There had been three citizen efforts to strike down the racist and outdated language from the Constitution:

- 2000 Alabama Amendment 2, which aimed to remove a ban on interracial marriage. It was approved with almost 60% of the votes in favor;
- 2004 Alabama Amendment 2, which sought to eliminate a requirement for segregated schools, as well as references to poll taxes. It was narrowly defeated with a margin of 1850 votes;
- 2012 Alabama Amendment 4, similar to the 2004 constitutional amendment. It was defeated with slightly more than 60% of the votes against.

== Amendment 4 ==
Amendment 4
- November 3, 2020
- Authorize Legislature to Recompile the State Constitution Measure

Results
Choice	Votes	%
Yes	1,222,682	66.82%
No	607,090	33.18%
County results
Yes
70–80%
60–70%
50–60%
No
50–60%

The referendum was preceded by a 2020 amendment that authorized the Alabama Legislature to draft a new version of the Constitution. Four sections were struck down from the document, including one that established school discrimination.

The measure passed with a wide majority of more than two thirds of the votes. It got its strongest results in Macon and Greene counties, while performing the worst in Covington county.

=== Results by county ===
County				
County	Yes		No	
County	Votes	Per.	Votes	Per.
Autauga	13,715	63.28%	7,958	36.72%
Baldwin	59,394	67.75%	28,276	32.25%
Barbour	4,975	66.76%	2,477	33.24%
Bibb	4,159	54.95%	3,410	45.05%
Blount	11,089	51.76%	10,336	48.24%
Bullock	2,256	74.46%	774	25.54%
Butler	4,149	60.67%	2,690	39.33%
Calhoun	26,412	67.58%	12,673	32.42%
Chambers	8,324	70.49%	3,484	29.51%
Cherokee	5,781	62.52%	3,465	37.48%
Chilton	7,890	51.8%	7,341	48.2%
Choctaw	2,841	54.35%	2,386	45.65%
Clarke	6,246	65.36%	3,311	34.64%
Clay	2,672	51.62%	2,504	48.38%
Cleburne	2,827	56.07%	2,215	43.93%
Coffee	11,210	63.08%	6,562	36.92%
Colbert	13,474	62.4%	8,120	37.6%
Conecuh	2,705	63.95%	1,525	36.05%
Coosa	2,390	57.9%	1,738	42.1%
Covington	6,081	46.26%	7,063	53.74%
Crenshaw	2,593	54.53%	2,162	45.47%
Cullman	17,361	52.58%	15,655	47.42%
Dale	10,001	64.2%	5,578	35.8%
Dallas	9,566	72.48%	3,633	27.52%
DeKalb	12,564	57.81%	9,168	42.19%
Elmore	19,517	60.35%	12,824	39.65%
Escambia	7,155	65.32%	3,798	34.68%
Etowah	22,493	58.8%	15,759	41.2%
Fayette	3,253	51.11%	3,112	48.89%
Franklin	5,417	57.74%	3,964	42.26%
Geneva	5,350	54.47%	4,472	45.53%
Greene	2,579	75.81%	823	24.19%
Hale	3,694	64.24%	2,056	35.76%
Henry	4,302	63.55%	2,468	36.45%
Houston	23,777	66.07%	12,211	33.93%
Jackson	10,488	61.39%	6,596	38.61%
Jefferson	196,446	72.0%	76,378	28.0%
Lamar	2,676	50.46%	2,627	49.54%
Lauderdale	21,267	63.0%	12,489	37.0%
Lawrence	7,020	57.55%	5,179	42.45%
Lee	43,319	73.52%	15,602	26.48%
Limestone	26,836	68.84%	12,146	31.16%
Lowndes	3,431	73.5%	1,237	26.5%
Macon	5,210	76.87%	1,568	23.13%
Madison	120,390	75.73%	38,582	24.27%
Marengo	4,776	59.98%	3,187	40.02%
Marion	5,454	51.85%	5,065	48.15%
Marshall	18,924	61.68%	11,757	38.32%
Mobile	97,867	70.26%	41,419	29.74%
Monroe	5,428	65.12%	2,908	34.88%
Montgomery	55,205	71.77%	21,711	28.23%
Morgan	26,683	63.77%	15,162	36.23%
Perry	2,400	65.79%	1,248	34.21%
Pickens	4,903	66.06%	2,519	33.94%
Pike	7,011	67.0%	3,453	33.0%
Randolph	4,910	62.43%	2,955	37.57%
Russell	11,928	73.81%	4,232	26.19%
Shelby	20,399	57.12%	15,316	42.88%
St. Clair	64,944	68.63%	29,685	31.37%
Sumter	2,494	62.55%	1,493	37.45%
Talladega	18,314	65.65%	9,581	34.35%
Tallapoosa	10,071	64.32%	5,587	35.68%
Tuscaloosa	50,347	68.83%	22,801	31.17%
Walker	13,602	55.57%	10,877	44.43%
Washington	4,066	64.42%	2,246	35.58%
Wilcox	3,363	73.14%	1,235	26.86%
Winston	4,298	50.23%	4,258	49.77%

== Results ==
The measure was broadly accepted, winning more than three fourths of the votes. It succeeded in every county of the state, performing the best in Macon and Madison counties. Conversely, it got its worst result in Choctaw county.

Ratify the Recompiled State Constitution
Choice	Votes	%
For	888,456	76.49
Against	273,040	23.51
Total	1,161,496	100.00

=== Results by county ===
County				
County	Yes		No	
County	Votes	Per.	Votes	Per.
Autauga	10,468	70.62%	4,356	29.38%
Baldwin	45,264	71.61%	17,943	28.39%
Barbour	3,710	75.1%	1,230	24.9%
Bibb	3,090	64.63%	1,691	35.37%
Blount	8,808	65.68%	4,603	34.32%
Bullock	1,486	79.13%	392	20.87%
Butler	3,233	70.74%	1,337	29.26%
Calhoun	18,060	75.24%	5,942	24.76%
Chambers	5,572	75.48%	1,810	24.52%
Cherokee	4,219	70.47%	1,768	29.53%
Chilton	6,522	64.43%	3,600	35.57%
Choctaw	2,285	58.95%	1,591	41.05%
Clarke	4,807	72.62%	1,812	27.38%
Clay	2,061	62.72%	1,225	37.28%
Cleburne	2,219	64.66%	1,213	35.34%
Coffee	8,657	75.85%	2,757	24.15%
Colbert	10,234	73.37%	3,715	26.63%
Conecuh	2,364	74.08%	827	25.92%
Coosa	2,152	69.92%	926	30.08%
Covington	5,798	69.08%	2,595	30.92%
Crenshaw	2,321	66.14%	1,188	33.86%
Cullman	13,824	66.24%	7,047	33.76%
Dale	7,463	75.43%	2,431	24.57%
Dallas	6,808	79.49%	1,757	20.51%
DeKalb	8,917	69.64%	3,888	30.36%
Elmore	15,368	71.24%	6,205	28.76%
Escambia	5,269	72.42%	2,007	27.58%
Etowah	15,300	73.43%	5,537	26.57%
Fayette	2,821	66.9%	1,396	33.1%
Franklin	3,611	65.12%	1,934	34.88%
Geneva	4,241	65.42%	2,242	34.58%
Greene	1,465	79.4%	380	20.6%
Hale	2,796	78.06%	786	21.94%
Henry	3,911	72.61%	1,475	27.39%
Houston	17,031	74.31%	5,888	25.69%
Jackson	6,678	69.18%	2,975	30.82%
Jefferson	139,184	81.45%	31,689	18.55%
Lamar	2,221	70.4%	934	29.6%
Lauderdale	15,119	74.48%	5,180	25.52%
Lawrence	5,733	66.53%	2,884	33.47%
Lee	28,259	82.43%	6,025	17.57%
Limestone	20,189	77.13%	5,985	22.87%
Lowndes	2,242	79.31%	585	20.69%
Macon	3,741	84.56%	683	15.44%
Madison	88,351	84.52%	16,186	15.48%
Marengo	3,710	71.25%	1,497	28.75%
Marion	4,186	66.28%	2,130	33.72%
Marshall	14,272	73.51%	5,142	26.49%
Mobile	68,834	78.06%	19,342	21.94%
Monroe	4,006	75.63%	1,291	24.37%
Montgomery	40,397	83.99%	7,703	16.01%
Morgan	20,045	77.45%	5,835	22.55%
Perry	1,787	81.45%	407	18.55%
Pickens	3,875	73.31%	1,411	26.69%
Pike	4,790	75.94%	1,518	24.06%
Randolph	3,387	67.6%	1,623	32.4%
Russell	7,594	80.86%	1,798	19.14%
Shelby	48,631	80.8%	11,556	19.2%
St. Clair	16,296	70.44%	6,840	29.56%
Sumter	2,043	80.21%	504	19.79%
Talladega	13,179	75.59%	4,255	24.41%
Tallapoosa	7,694	73.33%	2,798	26.67%
Tuscaloosa	32,275	77.6%	9,317	22.4%
Walker	9,457	64.87%	5,121	35.13%
Washington	2,868	60.79%	1,850	39.21%
Wilcox	1,873	74.12%	654	25.88%
Winston	3,385	64.93%	1,828	35.07%

== Aftermath ==
The new Constitution became the seventh in Alabama's history, succeeding the documents adopted in 1819, 1861, 1865, 1868, 1875 and 1901. Alabama joined Utah, Nebraska, Colorado, Vermont, Tennessee and Oregon in striking down slavery and involuntary servitude in their constitutions.
