= 2022 California Proposition 1 =

Successful referendum on enshrining reproductive rights in the state constitution

Proposition 1
- November 8, 2022
- Constitutional Right to Reproductive Freedom

Results
Choice	Votes	%
Yes	7,176,888	66.88%
No	3,553,564	33.12%
Valid votes	10,730,452	96.27%
Invalid or blank votes	416,168	3.73%
Total votes	11,146,620	100.00%
Registered voters/turnout	21,940,274	50.8%

Yes
90–100%
80–90%
70–80%
60–70%
50–60%
No
60–70%
50–60%
- Source: Statement of Vote at the Wayback Machine (archived September 23, 2023)

Proposition 1, titled Constitutional Right to Reproductive Freedom and initially known as Senate Constitutional Amendment 10 (SCA 10), was a California ballot proposition and state constitutional amendment that was voted on in the 2022 general election on November 8. Passing with more than two-thirds of the vote, the proposition amended the Constitution of California to explicitly grant the right to an abortion and contraceptives, making California among the first states in the nation to codify the right. The decision to propose the codification of abortion rights in the state constitution was precipitated in May 2022 by Politico's publishing of a leaked draft opinion showing the United States Supreme Court overturning Roe v. Wade and Planned Parenthood v. Casey in Dobbs v. Jackson Women's Health Organization. The decision reversed judicial precedent that previously held that the United States Constitution protected the right to an abortion.

The proposition was placed on the ballot as a result of a joint effort by California's leading Democrats: Governor Gavin Newsom, Senate President pro tempore Toni Atkins, and Assembly Speaker Anthony Rendon. The constitutional amendment passed the California State Senate in a 29–8 vote on June 20, 2022, and the California State Assembly with a 58–17 vote on June 27 – ahead of a June 30 deadline to have the amendment voted on in November. On July 1, California Secretary of State, Shirley Weber, formally designated the amendment as Proposition 1, making the proposed constitutional amendment the first abortion-related ballot measure in California since 2008, when Proposition 4 – an initiative that would have imposed a waiting period on abortions and required parental notification in the case of minors – was rejected.

Polling on Proposition 1 consistently showed that two-thirds to three-quarters of California voters supported the proposition, and suggested that the ballot measure would pass by a wide margin. The ballot measure derived most of its support from the California Democratic Party, feminists, medical professional organizations, labor unions, and newspaper editorial boards. Some supporters said the amendment would codify existing law, and protect Californian women from restrictive abortion policies. Opposition to Proposition 1 came from the California Republican Party, some Christian organizations, and anti-abortion groups. Part of the opposition argued that the ballot measure would legalize late-term abortion.

== Background ==
=== Constitutional amendment procedure ===
Any amendment to the Constitution of California requires the passage of a California ballot proposition by a simple majority of the voters. A constitutional amendment may be placed on the ballot by either a two-thirds vote in the California State Legislature, or though an initiative attaining signatures equal to eight percent of the votes cast in the last gubernatorial election through the exercise of the initiative power by the voters.

=== California abortion law ===
In the first session of the California State Legislature in 1850, the legislature passed the Crimes and Punishments Act, which criminalized an abortion in all circumstances except to save a woman's life. The State Legislature amended California's abortion law in 1967 with the Therapeutic Abortion Act, signed by Governor Ronald Reagan in June, which extended the right to an abortion in cases of rape and incest up to 20 weeks of pregnancy. In 1969, the California Supreme Court issued a ruling in People v. Belous that upheld the right to an abortion and struck down section 274 of the California Penal Code, which had defined the punishment for people who provided, supplied, or administered an abortion. The state voted in 1972 to pass Proposition 11, which amended the state constitution to include a right to privacy. Through Proposition 11, the California Supreme Court ruled in Committee to Defend Reproductive Rights v. Myers in 1981 that the constitutionally protected right to privacy included the right to choose whether to have an abortion, preventing Medi-Cal from restricting abortion coverage.

In September 1987, Governor George Deukmejian signed Assembly Bill 2274, which required unemancipated minors have parental consent before receiving an abortion, providing an exception for medical emergencies. The parental consent law was upheld in 1996 in a 4–3 ruling by the California Supreme Court in American Academy of Pediatrics v. Lungren, with the majority stating that the constitutional right to privacy did not extend to minors due to them not having the same rights as adults. The following year, the case was reheard after two members of the 1996 majority decision retired and were succeeded by Governor Pete Wilson's appointees. The law was found unconstitutional, with the California Supreme Court ruling that AB 2274 violated the right to privacy in the state constitution.

In 2002, Governor Gray Davis signed the Reproductive Privacy Act, which legalized abortion up to fetal viability, whereafter abortions can only be performed if continued pregnancy poses a risk to the woman's life. In 2015, Governor Jerry Brown signed the Reproductive FACT (Freedom, Accountability, Comprehensive Care, and Transparency) Act, requiring crisis pregnancy centers to disclose that the state provides family planning services, prenatal care, and abortion at low to no cost and state that they are unlicensed medical facilities. The law was struck down as unconstitutional in a 5–4 ruling in 2018 by the United States Supreme Court in National Institute of Family and Life Advocates v. Becerra, finding that the FACT Act violated the First Amendment. In 2019, Governor Gavin Newsom signed the College Student Right to Access Act, which required public universities to provide abortion medication on campus from January 2023, the first law of its kind in the United States. Newsom's predecessor, Brown, vetoed a similar bill in 2018.

In the 2021–22 session of the State Legislature, 16 bills were introduced in either the Assembly or the Senate to improve abortion access and legal protections in the state. Before Senate Constitutional Amendment 10 passed the legislature, two of the bills had been signed into law by Newsom, eliminating out-of-pocket expenses for abortions and protecting Californians from civil liability cases in states with contradictory abortion laws. California's move to strengthen abortion rights was part of a broader effort throughout the United States in anticipation of the United States Supreme Court case Dobbs v. Jackson Women's Health Organization, which would potentially result in the court overturning or weakening Roe v. Wade. The legislation and actions taken by Newsom represent California's intention to become a sanctuary state for abortion rights, a term previously used in reference to the state's response to immigration.

By the end of the session on August 31, the State Legislature passed an additional series of legislation. One bill further protected residents from out-of-state litigation related to abortion, prohibiting California law enforcement agencies from cooperating with authorities in other states on abortion-related investigations in cases where it is legal in California and increasing digital privacy protections by banning tech companies from providing the reproductive information they store with authorities enforcing abortion bans. Other legislation imposed limitations on the sharing of medical records and ended the requirement for coroners to investigate self-induced or criminal abortions or allow prosecution or civil action against people based on a fetal death certificate. The legislation would also allow nurse practitioners to carry out the procedure without physician supervision, limit the suspension of licensing and certification of abortion providers, permit out-of-state residents access to the Abortion Practical Support Fund to help them obtain abortions, create a website for in-state abortion services, and establishing grants for providers and programs that assist low-income and at-risk communities. After vetoing AB 2320 on September 22, Newsom signed 13 of the bills into law on September 27.

=== Previous propositions ===
In 2005, 2006, and 2008, there were three initiatives – Proposition 73, Proposition 85, and Proposition 4 respectively – that would have established parental notification and a mandatory waiting period on abortions in California. All three proposals were rejected by the voters. Proposition 73 caused concern for its opponents by defining abortion as the "death of the unborn child" instead of using clinical terms such as fetus or embryo. When Proposition 85 was placed on the ballot in 2006, the proposed constitutional amendment instead defined abortion as "the use of any means to terminate the pregnancy". The parental notification initiative underwent another revision before appearing on the 2008 ballot, allowing doctors to notify an adult family member other than the parent if the latter was abusive. The three-time effort to establish a parental notification law in California was largely funded by San Diego Reader owner Jim Holman and winemaker Don Sebastiani. 2008 marked the last time California voters decided on an abortion-related proposition.

=== Impetus for new proposition ===
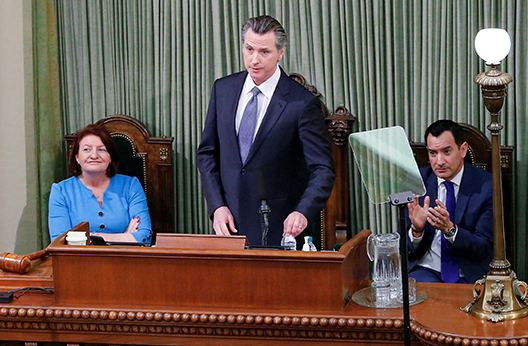
Gavin Newsom, Toni Atkins, and Anthony Rendon jointly called for a constitutional amendment on abortion after the leaked draft opinion of Dobbs.

On May 2, 2022, Politico published a leaked draft opinion of Dobbs, which showed the Supreme Court overturning Roe and Planned Parenthood v. Casey and determining that the federal constitution did not grant a right to an abortion. In response to the draft opinion, Newsom, Senate President pro tempore Toni Atkins, and Assembly Speaker Anthony Rendon issued a joint statement of their intent to enshrine abortion rights in the state constitution through an amendment. On June 24, the Supreme Court overturned Roe and Casey, with the final opinion being largely similar to the leaked draft opinion.

Due to the Supreme Court decision and abortion bans in other states, California experienced an increase of patients seeking abortions, with Planned Parenthood saying that the majority of new patients came from Texas. Just weeks after Roe's reversal, Planned Parenthood experienced an 847% increase in Arizona patients, with most out-of-state patients traveling along Interstate 8 in Southern California and lengthening wait times at a Planned Parenthood clinic in El Centro. With abortion banned in Arizona, some of the state's abortion providers stated their plans on opening clinics on the western side of the state border in California. According to the Guttmacher Institute, the number of patients seeking abortions in California could increase from 46,000 to 1.4 million on an annual basis. The UCLA School of Law Center on Reproductive Health, Law, and Policy made a more conservative estimate, approximating that 10,600 more people will come to California for abortion services each year.

California was one of six US states that voted on an abortion-related ballot measure in 2022, the most to occur in the US in a single year, with votes also occurring in Kansas, Kentucky, Michigan, Montana, and Vermont. Of the six, three – California, Michigan, and Vermont – asked voters to enshrine the right to an abortion in their respective state constitutions, while the other states worked to implement restrictive abortion policies. On August 2, Kansas voters rejected a proposed constitutional amendment that would have stated that the state constitution did not grant the right to an abortion. There was uncertainty whether abortion rights would be put to a vote in Michigan, with the initiative having collected more than 700,000 signatures, the most for any petition in state history, as the Michigan Board of State Canvassers rejected the initiative in a 2–2 vote split between Democrats and Republicans on August 31. On September 8, the Michigan Supreme Court ordered the Board of State Canvassers to certify the initiative and place it on the ballot in a 5–2 decision, which the board did the next day on September 9.

== Legislative process ==
=== Proposed constitutional changes ===
The constitutional amendment would add Section 1.1 to Article I of the state constitution to read:

The state shall not deny or interfere with an individual's reproductive freedom in their most intimate decisions, which includes their fundamental right to choose to have an abortion and their fundamental right to choose or refuse contraceptives. This section is intended to further the constitutional right to privacy guaranteed by Section 1, and the constitutional right to not be denied equal protection guaranteed by Section 7. Nothing herein narrows or limits the right to privacy or equal protection.

=== Senate ===
External videos
- Senate Judiciary Committee hearing on June 14, 2022 (1:46:20–2:45:21)
- Senate Elections and Constitutional Amendments Committee hearing on June 14, 2022
- Senate Appropriations Committee hearing on June 16, 2022 (0:02:38–0:18:44)
- Senate floor session on June 20, 2022 (1:26:24–1:51:00)

Senate debate and vote on SCA 10, June 20, 2022

Result of the Senate vote by district For Against Did not vote

On June 8, 2022, Atkins introduced Senate Constitutional Amendment 10 (SCA 10), co-authored by Rendon and other state Democrats to codify a constitutional right to reproductive freedom. Atkins stated that SCA 10 would codify abortion and contraception protections that already existed in California state law. For the constitutional amendment to appear on the November 2022 ballot, it had to receive a two-thirds vote in both houses of the legislature by June 30.

SCA 10 moved through the legislative process at an unusually fast pace. On June 14, SCA 10 passed in a 9–1 vote in the Senate Judiciary Committee, with the lone opposition vote coming from a Republican. The proposed amendment also passed the Senate Elections and Amendments Committee in a 3–1 vote on the same day. On June 16, SCA 10 passed 5–2 in the Senate Appropriations Committee. After having cleared the committees the amendment was assigned to, the Senate voted 29–8 on June 20 to pass SCA 10, which occurred along party lines. Democratic senators Bob Archuleta and Bob Wieckowski and Republican senator Andreas Borgeas did not record a vote on the amendment. On June 29, the Senate voted 28–8 to pass Senate Bill 131, which required the California Secretary of State to designate SCA 10 as Proposition 1 on the ballot of the upcoming election.

Senate Constitutional Amendment 10 – Vote in the Senate (June 20, 2022)
Party	Votes for	Votes against	Not voting
Democratic (31)	29	–	2
Republican (9)	–	8	1
Total (40)	29	8	3

=== Assembly ===
Assembly debate and vote on SCA 10, June 27, 2022

External videos
- Assembly Judiciary Committee hearing on June 23, 2022
- Assembly floor session on June 27, 2022 (1:38:09–2:36:52)

Result of the Assembly vote by district For Against Did not vote

On June 23, the Assembly Judiciary Committee passed the amendment in a 7–2 vote. On June 27, the Assembly voted 58–17 to pass SCA 10, allowing the amendment to be put to a vote before California voters in the general election. During the Assembly debate, Republican assemblymember Kevin Kiley asked whether the constitutional amendment would change limitations on abortion past viability. After a 30 second pause, Rendon quietly spoke with other Democratic assemblymembers and asked for the question to be restated, thereafter promising to answer Kiley's question another time. The question remained unanswered. Suzette Martinez Valladares was the only Republican to vote in favor of SCA 10, with her justification being, "While I am personally pro-life with exceptions, I believe that voters should have a choice in deciding this issue in November." Democratic assemblymembers Ken Cooley, Tim Grayson, and Robert Rivas, Republican assemblymember Phillip Chen, and independent assemblymember Chad Mayes did not record a vote. On June 29, the Assembly passed SB 131 in a 60–17 vote, sending the bill to the governor, who approved the legislation the next day, making certain SCA 10's designation as Proposition 1.

Senate Constitutional Amendment 10 – Vote in the Assembly (June 27, 2022)
Party	Votes for	Votes against	Not voting
Democratic (60)	57	–	3
Republican (19)	1	17	1
Independent (1)	–	–	1
Total (80)	58	17	5

== Campaign ==
=== Designation and legislative analysis ===
On July 1, 2022, California Secretary of State Shirley Weber designated SCA 10 as Proposition 1 for the November 2022 election, being one of seven ballot propositions in the general election. The constitutional amendment's designation as Proposition 1 was pursuant to the requirement in SB 131. Proposition 1 was later given the ballot title "Constitutional Right to Reproductive Freedom" by July 8.

For the voter information guide provided by the Secretary of State, the Legislative Analyst's Office (LAO) did not find that Proposition 1 had any fiscal effect, unless a court interpreted the proposition as expanding reproductive rights beyond existing law. The LAO also explained the effect of voting yes or no, which as follows:

A YES vote on this measure means: The California Constitution would be changed to expressly include existing rights to reproductive freedom—such as the right to choose whether or not to have an abortion and use contraceptives.
A NO vote on this measure means: The California Constitution would not be changed to expressly include existing rights to reproductive freedom. These rights, however, would continue to exist under other state law.

=== Arguments and rebuttals ===
The official argument in favor of Proposition 1 was co-written by Shannon Udovic-Constant, Jodi Hicks, and Carol Moon Goldberg, each representing the California Medical Association, the Planned Parenthood Affiliates of California, and the League of Women Voters of California respectively. In their argument, they wrote, in part, that "a person's right to an abortion or contraceptives should be protected in California".

California Alliance Pregnancy Care executive director Allison Martinez, Pacific Justice Institute president Brad Dacus, and gynecologist Vansen Wong co-wrote the rebuttal to the argument in favor of Proposition 1, stating that the constitutional amendment was unnecessary in protecting abortion rights and focusing on the cost to taxpayers.

The official argument against Proposition 1 was co-written by gynecologist Anne Marie Adams, International Faith Based Coalition president Tak Allen, and Assemblymember Jim Patterson, which stated in part, "Proposition 1 is an extreme, expensive, and pointless waste of tax money that will allow urestricted late-term abortions costing taxpayers millions."

Rebutting the argument against Proposition 1 were California Nurses Association president Sandy Reding, American College of Obstetricians and Gynecologists District IX chair Kelly McCue, and UCLA Center on Reproductive Health, Law, and Policy faculty director Cary Franklin, who wrote that "[e]xisting California law provides that women have the right to choose to have an abortion prior to viability, or to protect the woman's life or health. Proposition 1 will not change that."

=== Discussion on effects ===
Michele Goodwin, a professor at the University of California, Irvine, said the amendment would give legal opportunities to people who are denied contraceptives. University of Southern California professor Dima Qato offered support and criticism of Proposition 1, "We don't need more laws when we don't address the root cause of a lack of effectiveness of these laws in [low-income and minority] communities." On June 22, UC Berkeley School of Law senior research fellow Allison Macbeth and UC Hastings College of Law student and Hastings Law Journal editor Elizabeth Bernal warned that the effects of constitutional amendment could be overturned in a case similar to Dobbs if the proposed amendment's language does not specify that it codifies the rulings made in Roe, Casey, and Griswold v. Connecticut. Berkeley Law's California Constitution Center countered Macbeth and Bernal in stating that California's direct democracy imposes limitations on the state judiciary in overturning the constitutional amendment, writing that "further initiatives and retention elections are potent threats to courts that ignore majority preferences." Zócalo Public Square columnist Joe Mathews wrote in the Ventura County Star on August 11 that Proposition 1 represented an unnecessary risk, stating that "[s]ome freedoms are so fundamental that we shouldn't let the people vote to take them away."

==== Campaign strategy ====
On June 24, San Francisco Chronicle's Sophia Bollag found that Republican candidates campaigning for statewide office in California were largely quiet about abortion rights and the effort to codify those rights into the state constitution. On the hesitance of Republican politicians to discuss abortion, Fullerton College professor Jodi Balma told the Los Angeles Times, "I think Republicans in California would like to pretend [the abortion issue] doesn't exist." The move by California Republicans to avoid discussing abortion followed a national strategy to keep anti-abortion positions absent from campaign websites and mailers while focusing on issues such as inflation, crime, education, and homelessness. Janie Har of the Associated Press wrote on October 14 that Proposition 1 faced "minimal financial opposition from the California Republican Party." Al Jazeera described the party as having "largely resigned itself to the measure's likely passage."

Political Data Inc. vice president Paul Mitchell noted that California Democrats campaigned differently from the norm, stating, "Across the ticket, Democrats...employed a unique strategy — campaigning for abortion rights instead of campaigning for themselves."

==== Viability ====
On June 27, Southern California News Group columnist Susan Shelley wrote that the amendment could overwrite existing statutory laws that impose limits on abortion, "If SCA 10 is adopted, the 'except' language in current law could be interpreted by a court as an unconstitutional infringement of the 'fundamental right to choose to have an abortion.'" In an opinion article for the Los Angeles Times on July 14, political columnist George Skelton wrote that Proposition 1 could be interpreted as expanding abortion rights to include late-term abortion instead of the authors' view that the proposition codifies existing state law into the constitution. Skelton stated that the "drafters should have made clear in the measure's language that it was permissible to limit abortion after a fetus reaches viability." UC Davis School of Law professor Mary Ziegler said that Proposition 1 "opens the door" to judicial interpretation as to whether the constitutional amendment changes existing viability limits on abortion in California. If Proposition 1 removes the viability limit, California would become the seventh state to have no such limit, joining Alaska, Colorado, New Jersey, New Mexico, Oregon, and Vermont along with Washington, D.C. in that regard.

UC Berkeley law school dean Erwin Chemerinsky argued that Proposition 1 would not change the existing state law on viability, "Rights are not absolute even if enumerated. Free speech is an example. The same would be true of abortion rights." Loyola Law School professor Brietta Clark made a similar statement, saying that "[t]he state will still be able to regulate abortion...[as c]onstitutional rights are never absolute." Kimberly West-Faulcon, a fellow professor at Loyola, reached the same conclusion. Melissa Murray, a New York University law professor, said that the courts were unlikely to interpret Proposition 1 as allowing abortion without restrictions, and the constitutional amendment was more likely to prevent future legislatures from imposing "unnecessary restrictions like the requirement of an ultrasound." Santa Clara University School of Law professor Margaret Russell said that the courts could not disregard the intentions of Proposition 1's authors, who stated that the language was a reaffirmation of existing law rather than a bait-and-switch.

==== Voter turnout ====
US President Joe Biden and his strategists watched Proposition 1 and initiatives in other states to craft a national strategy to protect abortion rights as voters had done in Kansas, where the Democratic National Committee conducted digital canvassing to get out the vote. Multiple writers, such as Ed Kilgore for New York, Ronald Brownstein for The Atlantic, and Jeremy White for Politico, wrote that voter turnout for Proposition 1 could adversely affect the electoral performance of Republican congresspeople such as Ken Calvert, Mike Garcia, Young Kim, Michelle Steel, and David Valadao in the 2022 election for the United States House of Representatives, with Kilgore writing that "[k]eeping these seats in the GOP column (much less flipping Democratic ones) will be a lot harder than it might have been had the Supreme Court not abolished federal constitutional abortion rights." Ben Christopher wrote in a CalMatters newsletter on September 15 that Proposition 1 "serves a political purpose...[as] putting abortion on the ballot in 2022 tends to draw Democrats to the ballot." Robin Swanson, a Democratic political strategist, told CapRadio that Democratic spending on Proposition 1 was part of an effort to increase female turnout and play a deciding factor in the state's competitive elections.

Some commentators, such as Republican political strategist Rob Stutzman, argued that Proposition 1 could have unintended consequences for the Democrats, with Stutzman stating, "Newsom talking about California as a sanctuary state for abortions...may not sit well with more moderate voters." Richard Temple, the No campaign's chief political strategist, said, "[Dobbs] has opened up questions about abortions in large and small ways, and there are voters in the state, including Democratic voters, who differentiate on the issue in these ways." No campaign spokesperson Catherine Hadro argued that the possibility of fetal viability limitations being overturned by Proposition 1 would help defeat the ballot measure. Hicks acknowledged that the short time frame in which Proposition 1 was put on the ballot presented a challenge to voter awareness and turnout since ballot measure planning typically starts years in advance, not months.

San Francisco Chronicle political writer Joe Garofoli wrote that the margin by which Proposition 1 passed would determine whether the constitutional amendment "will send a national message that...will inspire other states to fight back against the Supreme Court decision." Following the strategy of the California Democratic Party, Kilgore wrote that Democrats elsewhere may try to have abortion referendums in their states in future elections due to the turnout it could produce in Democratic-leaning voters and how their votes could affect other elections on the ballot.

==== Federal precedence ====
Some of the commentary on Proposition 1 centered on its effectiveness if the federal government imposes a national abortion ban. David Lightman and Lindsey Holden wrote an article in The Sacramento Bee on July 18 that the ballot proposition and the wider issue of abortion could lead to the return of nullification policies. After Lindsey Graham proposed a bill in the US Senate on September 13 that would impose a national 15-week abortion ban, Politico's Lara Korte, Jeremy White, and Sakura Cannestra wrote, "A federal ban would almost instantly trigger a slate of lawsuits from states that allow abortions past 15 weeks, but if the courts ultimately uphold it, states would have to fall into line." Berkeley Law's California Constitution Center executive director, David A. Carillo, told Politico that "[a] state constitutional right allows California's lawyers to position state sovereignty against federal commerce clause powers." The Sacramento Bee's Andrew Sheeler noted, "The Supremacy Clause of the U.S. Constitution usually gives federal law precedence over state statutes and even state constitutions."

Chemerinsky said, "If Congress adopts a law prohibiting abortions (like Lindsey Graham's), that would pre-empt state laws to the contrary," such as Proposition 1. Chemerinsky argued that Gonzales v. Raich would give Congress the standing to regulate abortion on commerce grounds, "I think abortion is economic activity... because it is a service bought and sold." Conversely, Chemerinsky said any federal law that guaranteed abortion rights would supersede any conflicting law at the state level. Bob Egelko, a San Francisco Chronicle writer, called the federal government's ability to supersede state abortion law "ironic, because the Supreme Court, in its June 24 ruling, said regulation of abortion was a matter for the states and their elected representatives." University of San Francisco professor Luke Boso said that the Supreme Court would likely have to decide whether federal abortion law takes precedence over state law. San José State University and Menlo College lecturer Donna Crane told the Associated Press that a federal ban or subsequent decisions by the Supreme Court would render California's abortion laws null.

=== Spending ===
In early August, neither supporters nor opponents of Proposition 1 had yet to spend any money on the proposed constitutional amendment compared to the six other propositions on the 2022 general election ballot in California, in which US$461 million had already been spent. By August 18, the Yes campaign raised $1.2 million while the No campaign received comparatively little financial support except for a $1000 contribution from Sacramento bishop Jaime Soto. White and Korte from Politico wrote that the proposition's opponents "are certain to be outspent." By September 17, the Yes campaign received $3.2 million in contributions, with about $130,000 in contributions going to the No campaign. Comparatively, the campaigns for the other California ballot propositions spent $564.8 million by this time.

Data from the California Fair Political Practices Commission showed the Yes campaign's top donors as of September 13 were M. Quinn Delaney, several Planned Parenthood affiliates, the California Federation of Teachers, the California Teachers Association, the American Civil Liberties Union of Northern California, Lyft, and the California Medical Association, with the largest total contribution from one individual or group being $500,000. The commission stated that the No campaign did not attain the reporting threshold necessary for the disclosure of its top donors. On September 15, the Federated Indians of Graton Rancheria pledged $5 million to the Yes campaign, representing the campaign's largest contribution to date. Steve and Connie Ballmer, the former being the owner of the Los Angeles Clippers and former CEO of Microsoft, each made $250,000 late September donations in support of Proposition 1.

By late September, Garofoli stated that the Yes campaign had enough money for a week's worth of television advertisements, and the No campaign only raised enough money for yard signs in Temecula. In October, Newsom spent $2.5 million for a television advertisement, which debuted on October 10, promoting Proposition 1 and urging Californians to vote for the constitutional amendment. The spending for the advertisement made Newsom the second-largest contributor to the Yes campaign, second only to the Federated Indians of Graton Rancheria. On October 12, the Yes campaign announced the beginning of its media campaign in multiple formats and languages. In mid-October, 2022 Los Angeles mayoral candidate Rick Caruso donated $100,000 to the Yes campaign's committee. The donation came months after a May 3 pledge Caruso made on Twitter to donate an initial $100,000 and, ultimately, $1 million toward the constitutional amendment's passage. By late October, data showed that the Yes campaign spent $14 million, and the No campaign spent $1.6 million, with $681.4 million spent in other California proposition campaigns. By the end of the campaign, the Yes campaign raised 10 times as much money compared to the No campaign, raising $22 million against the No campaign's $2.2 million.

=== Media ===
The San Diego Union-Tribune published two opinion articles representing both sides of the Proposition 1 debate on August 19, with Atkins and Planned Parenthood of the Pacific Southwest CEO Darrah DiGiorgio Johnson representing Yes and Pregnancy Care Clinic development director and Cajon Valley Union School District board member Jo Alegria representing No. Constitutional lawyer Cary Franklin, who had previously co-wrote the rebuttal to the argument against Proposition 1, authored commentary supportive of the amendment in a CalMatters article on September 23. Right to Life of Kern County executive director Judy Goad wrote an article in The Bakersfield Californian on September 29, urging a vote against Proposition 1. San Francisco archbishop Salvatore Cordileone published videos in English and Spanish to also urge a No vote.

KQED-FM held a podcast session on September 29 in which a panel discussed Proposition 1 as part of Prop Fest 2022. On October 8, CalMatters' Emily Hoeven and David Lesher discussed Proposition 1 and the other ballot propositions at Politifest, an event organized by Voice of San Diego at the University of San Diego. In San Francisco, former United States Secretary of State Hillary Clinton moderated an October 13 panel discussion on Proposition 1 involving Lieutenant Governor Eleni Kounalakis, NARAL Pro-Choice America president Mini Timmaraju, and Planned Parenthood Affiliates of California president Jodi Hicks.

PolitiFact assessed the factuality of one of the No campaign's claims about Proposition 1, finding that their statement that "the number of abortion seekers from other states will soar even higher, costing taxpayers millions more" was mostly false because the LAO concluded there was "no direct fiscal effect" stemming from the ballot measure, and the number of abortion cases in California would likely increase anyway due to the imposition of restrictive policies in other states. A factcheck from the Associated Press determined that the claim of Proposition 1 legalizing late-term abortion was "missing context" as there was no mention in the constitutional amendment and the courts were unlikely to interpret it as legalizing such abortions. PolitiFact's Gabrielle Settles and USA Today's Nate Trela reached the same conclusion in their factchecks of the claim.

=== Protests ===
On August 25, a Women's Equality Day event at San Francisco City Hall was interrupted while Supervisor Catherine Stefani was giving a speech by anti-abortion protesters demonstrating against Proposition 1. A number of protesters had traveled from as far as South Carolina. Competing protests over Proposition 1 occurred at Sather Gate on the University of California, Berkeley campus between Rise Up for Abortion Rights and Pro-Life San Francisco on August 26, raising awareness of the proposed constitutional amendment.

On October 8, Women's March held 450 marches across the United States. Some of the protests occurred in California, with one protest held in front of Oakland City Hall and co-organized by the East Bay Democratic Socialists of America, Planned Parenthood Advocates Mar Monte, and Oakland Education Association and attended by more than 100 protesters demonstrating in support of Proposition 1.

== Positions ==
=== Political parties ===
Political parties	Position	Ref.
Democratic	Yes	
Green	Yes	
Peace and Freedom	Yes	
California National	Yes	
Republican	No	
American Solidarity	No	
Socialist Workers	No	
Libertarian	Neutral	

=== Support ===
Yes on Proposition 1 logo

With the effort to codify reproductive rights into the state constitution being initiated by the California's Democratic political leadership – Newsom, Atkins, and Rendon – the Yes campaign for Proposition 1 received broad support from the California Democratic Party and its membership. The campaign, led by Protect Abortion Rights, maintained a list of supporters that comprised the coalition in support of Proposition 1, and explained in the footer of their website that the campaign was largely supported by Atkins and the Planned Parenthood Affiliates of California. In that list, California's two US senators, seven US representatives, 15 state senators, and 24 state assemblymembers were part of the Yes campaign's coalition. Dianne Feinstein and Alex Padilla, the state's US senators, officially joined the coalition on July 28. All of California's elected executive branch officials endorsed Proposition 1, which includes Newsom, Lieutenant Governor Eleni Kounalakis, Secretary of State Shirley Weber, State Treasurer Fiona Ma, State Controller Betty Yee, State Superintendent of Public Instruction Tony Thurmond, Insurance Commissioner Ricardo Lara, and Attorney General Rob Bonta. Democratic candidates seeking elected office, such as state controller candidate Malia Cohen and state assemblymember candidate Diane Papan, also indicated their support for Proposition 1.

Some Republicans held divergent views from their party on Proposition 1, the latter being opposed, with attorney general candidate Nathan Hochman telling The San Diego Union-Tribune that, as long as "Proposition 1 does as its authors state, which is to merely codify California's current law on abortion and the viability standard, I would support Proposition 1". State controller candidate Lanhee Chen gave qualified support for enshrining California's existing abortion law into the state constitution, and expressing concern about Proposition 1's language.

The Green Party of California endorsed Proposition 1, sharing the party's Alameda County branch's voting guide, in which the branch stated, "[P]utting reproductive rights into the state constitution has significant benefits for women in California." The endorsement by the Green Party of Alameda County also came with criticism for the wording of Proposition 1, "[W]omen merit no mention in the proposition, the right to choose abortion belonging to an 'individual'... The decision to have an abortion belongs to the pregnant woman alone, no one else. That should have been spelled out." On September 9, the Peace and Freedom Party announced its support for Proposition 1 while criticizing the limited scope of the constitutional amending by stating, "It makes explicit the right to abortion and contraceptives in the California constitution. It does not include universal free health care, paid family leave, and child care, which would give us real reproductive freedom. But still, this is a YES." On October 11, the California National Party announced its support for voting Yes on Proposition 1, according to the positions stated in the party platform.

Local governments compose part of the Yes campaign. Five county boards of supervisors voted unanimously to support amending the state constitution to protect reproductive rights: Alameda on May 10, San Mateo on August 2, Santa Clara on August 16, Humboldt on October 4 and Los Angeles on November 1. On May 24, the San Diego County Board of Supervisors voted 3–1 to support a constitutional amendment for abortion rights, with the lone vote against being Republican Jim Desmond. The Irvine City Council voted 3–2 on July 12 to support the constitutional amendment. On August 30, four members of the Oakland City Council announced a September 20 vote on a resolution declaring Oakland's support for Proposition 1, which the city council adopted in an 8–0 vote. In Los Angeles, city council president Nury Martinez and president pro tempore Mitch O'Farrell introduced a resolution on September 20 supporting the proposition. The city council passed the resolution on October 25.

Urging Californians to vote Yes, the League of Women Voters of California wrote that "Prop 1 protects access to the care that will give individuals and families the freedom to make those choices". The National Women's Political Caucus of California endorsed Proposition 1, stating that the constitutional amendment "will ensure robust protection for both California residents as well as anyone seeking abortions here". The American Association of University Women, Black Women for Wellness Action Project. the Los Angeles chapter of the National Coalition of 100 Black Women, California National Organization for Women, and Feminist Majority Foundation comprised additional organizations that were part of the Yes campaign. The Women's Foundation California supports the constitutional amendment.

Multiple medical professional organizations expressed their support for Proposition 1. California Medical Association board chair Shannon Udovic-Constant issued a statement on July 7 on the behalf of the CMA in support of Proposition 1, stating that the organization "strongly believes that medical decisions – including those around abortion and contraception – should be made by patients in consultation with their health care providers". The American College of Obstetricians and Gynecologists explained their position supporting Proposition 1 by stating that the proposal "would amend the California Constitution to guarantee the fundamental right for patients to make and clinicians to carry out reproductive decisions without medically unjustified legislative interference". Essential Access Health, Planned Parenthood Affiliates of California, and Training in Early Abortion for Comprehensive Healthcare are co-sponsors for the Yes campaign. On September 8, Planned Parenthood of Orange and San Bernardino Counties senior vice president Robert Armenta authored an opinion article in the Los Angeles Times in support of Proposition 1.

Several labor unions in California joined the Yes campaign. On July 25, the California Nurses Association endorsed Proposition 1 as it would "ensure that those conversations around reproductive health care – including about abortion and contraception – remain between a provider and their patient and are based on science and facts, not someone else's political agenda". The California Teachers Association board of directors endorsed Proposition 1, with CTA president E. Toby Boyd saying, "Our mothers, daughters, partners, sisters, and friends should have the freedom and right to determine their health care, and to make deeply personal decisions on their own, a fundamental human right." The American Federation of State, County and Municipal Employees, Asian Pacific American Labor Alliance in Sacramento and San Francisco, California Faculty Association, California Federation of Teachers, California Labor Federation, SEIU California State Council, and United Food and Commercial Workers State Council are also part of the Yes campaign.

NARAL Pro-Choice America president Mini Timmaraju expressed support for Proposition 1 and said that the constitutional amendment "sends a clear message across the country that California will never stop protecting the freedom to decide". On August 3, Equality California expressed support for Proposition 1, calling it an "opportunity to further solidify California's long-time standing as a nationwide leader in reproductive rights". On August 16, Asian Americans Advancing Justice Southern California announced its support for Proposition 1. Courage California endorsed voting for Proposition 1. Disability Rights California gave its support for Proposition 1 on September 30 on the basis that "[p]eople with disabilities and communities of color are disproportionately impacted by restrictions to contraceptives and abortions". Sierra Club California's position on Proposition 1 is Yes, writing that "Sierra Club works to advance environmental and social justice, and support for Proposition 1 is consistent with those values". California Environmental Voters also endorsed Proposition 1. On October 3, the Human Rights Campaign announced its support for voting Yes on Proposition 1, with senior vice president JoDee Winterhof stating, "[T]he Human Rights Campaign is endorsing positions on 11 ballot measures in an effort to help strengthen our democracy, and preserve our rights and freedoms." Joining the Yes campaign are the Advocates for Youth, American Civil Liberties Union, Environmental Health Coalition, California League of United Latin American Citizens, Media Alliance, and Natural Resources Defense Council.

Editorial boards representing 14 of California's newspapers published articles in support of Proposition 1: the East Bay Times and The Mercury News jointly on August 13 (republished by the Marin Independent Journal on September 19); the Santa Cruz Sentinel on August 30; the Bay Area Reporter on August 31; the Los Angeles Times on September 5; The Press Democrat on September 16; the San Francisco Chronicle on September 18; The Bakersfield Californian on September 25; and The Sacramento Bee, The Fresno Bee, The Modesto Bee, and San Luis Obispo Tribune jointly on September 26; and The San Diego Union-Tribune on October 5. The Santa Cruz Sentinel's endorsement was qualified, expressing the need for limitations on late-term abortion: "[T]he Legislature can, and should, pass laws establishing the parameters of when an abortion could be performed, just as legislators do for other established constitutional rights." Larry Wilson, a Southern California News Group editorial board member, wrote about his support for Proposition 1 in the Pasadena Star-News.

Religious organizations representing the Yes campaign include American Atheists; Atheists United; Catholics for Choice; Hadassah Women's Zionist Organization of America; the Jewish Community Relations Council of San Francisco, the Peninsula, Marin, Sonoma, Alameda, and Contra Costa Counties; the National Council of Jewish Women CA; and the Pilgrim United Church of Christ. On October 17, the Freedom From Religion Foundation announced their support for Proposition 1 "to make sure that religious ideologues cannot impose their will on California residents when it comes to reproductive health".

On September 15, Federated Indians of Graton Rancheria tribal chairman Greg Sarris endorsed voting Yes on Proposition 1 and stated: "It is most important to the Federated Indians of Graton Rancheria that all women, particularly indigenous women and all low-income and women of color, continue to have sovereign rights over their bodies and access to all existing health care available to them." Thomas Jefferson School of Law professor emerita Marjorie Cohn wrote an opinion article in Truthout on September 21 of the need to pass Proposition 1 because "the California Constitution does not explicitly contain the right to abortion. A future California Supreme Court could overrule Myers, and hold that the constitutional right to privacy does not extend to abortion."

The San Francisco Bay Area Planning and Urban Research Association recommended voting Yes on Proposition 1, writing that "it is important that the state ensures the strength and clarity of reproductive freedom law". The Bay Area Council represents one business group that joined the Yes campaign.

=== Opposition ===
No on Proposition 1 logo

The group leading the campaign against Proposition 1 was California Together. The California Republican Party announced its opposition to Proposition 1 on August 19. The No campaign was supported by state senator Brian Dahle and assemblymembers Megan Dahle and Jim Patterson, the latter of whom co-wrote the official argument against Proposition 1. State treasurer candidate Jack Guerrero cited his Roman Catholic faith and called the proposed constitutional amendment a "radical agenda...which would legalize taxpayer-funded abortion on demand to the moment of birth for any reason or no reason at all." State superintendent of public instruction candidate Lance Christensen opposes the ballot measure. Carl DeMaio, a member of the San Diego City Council from 2008 to 2012 and chairman of Reform California, recommended a No vote on Proposition 1, stating that the amendment "would repeal the current ban on abortions after 23 weeks of a pregnancy and allow the right to a late-term abortion up to the moment of birth." In early August, San Clemente city council member Steve Knoblock proposed an anti-abortion resolution to show his opposition to Proposition 1. Tom Campbell, a Chapman University professor and former US representative, wrote an opinion article in The Orange County Register on August 20, stating that the State Legislature should "withdraw Proposition 1 and offer an alternative that protects the right to an abortion up to viability – current state law."

In San Mateo, Rod Linhares was the lone city council candidate who did not share their position on either abortion or Proposition 1, with all other candidates for the San Mateo City Council affirming their support for both. On November 2, Linhares emailed the San Mateo Daily Journal's Mark Simon, stating his opposition to Proposition 1 and claiming that the ballot measure "allows abortion in the last three months" of pregnancy.

The California Catholic Conference issued a statement opposing SCA 10, stating that the amendment would "legalize and protect abortion up to the point just prior to delivery" and calling for Catholics in the state to oppose the ballot measure. The statement was signed by Los Angeles Archbishop José Horacio Gómez, San Francisco Archbishop Salvatore Cordileone, and bishops from 10 other California dioceses. Two of the bishops who signed onto the statement, San Jose bishop Oscar Cantú and Orange bishop Kevin Vann, coauthored an America opinion article with Orange auxiliary bishop and California Catholic Conference secretary–treasurer Timothy Freyer on November 4 to express their opposition to Proposition 1, writing in part that "[t]he California Legislature is prioritizing abortion over all other social safety net concerns." The organization crafted pew cards and flyers in English and Spanish, also producing the former in Korean and Vietnamese, to distribute to churchgoers, instructing them to vote against Proposition 1. The California Family Council wrote that "Proposition 1 is an extreme and costly proposal that does nothing to advance women's health". The American Council of Evangelicals and California Knights of Columbus also represent part of the No campaign.

The American Solidarity Party of California stated their opposition to Proposition 1, "No other state has ever tried to amend into its state constitution the right to abortion at any stage, even late-term abortions." On November 5, Betsey Stone announced the Socialist Workers Party's opposition to the constitutional amendment in The Militant, arguing that "we need to fight to make abortion rarer by changing the social conditions that have led to its widespread use."

Feminists for Life opposed Senate Constitutional Amendment 10, with its president, Serrin Foster, stating in part, "Rather than assist families and pregnant women with practical resources, California legislators seek to codify abortion in a constitutional amendment — and make California an abortion destination." The organization later joined the campaign against Proposition 1 with the Christian Medical and Dental Associations, Democrats for Life, Live Action, Students for Life, Walk for Life West Coast, and William Jessup University.

Southern California News Group editorial board member John Seiler wrote an opinion article in The San Bernardino Sun on September 3 in which he stated that he would vote against Proposition 1, noting that the ballot measure will still pass. Writing in The Press-Enterprise on September 18, SCNG editorial writer Susan Shelley joined Seiler in opposition to Proposition 1, writing that the constitutional amendment "will legalize abortion in California at any stage of any pregnancy, right up to birth, for any reason." Catholic News Agency senior writer Kevin J. Jones stated his opposition to Proposition 1 on October 6 by writing that "[u]nlimited abortion would become a fundamental right, as would abortion on viable unborn children."

=== Neutral or no position ===
The Libertarian Party of California published a voter guide that stated the party's position on candidates and ballot measures. Sharing the party's position on all other state propositions, the Libertarian Party omitted its position on Proposition 1. The Orange County Register's editorial board opted not to publish a position on Proposition 1, instead taking positions on the state's other ballot measures. Along with all of the state's other propositions, the California branch of the Council on American–Islamic Relations claimed no position on Proposition 1, stating that "though the issues on the ballot are of great importance, they fall outside the scope of CAIR-CA's focus and mission". In a question and answer interview with The San Diego Union-Tribune, insurance commissioner candidate Robert Howell did not share his position on Proposition 1, writing in part, "I do not think the Insurance Commissioner's Office has any control of this issue. We will need to see what the people of California have to say in November." At the American Liberty Forum in Ramona on September 24, San Diego County Sheriff candidate John Hemmerling, endorsed by the Republican Party, refused to "take any position on state propositions or proposed federal legislation related to abortion". On October 4, the San Marcos City Council voted 3–2 against a resolution affirming the city's support for Proposition 1 as the majority determined that the city should not take a position on the issue and let the voters decide its fate.

== Opinion polling ==
=== Preferences ===
Poll source	Date(s)	Sample (Note: Sample size key: A – all adults DV – decided voters RV – registered voters LV – likely voters V – unclear)		Margin of error				Lead	Ref.
Poll source	Date(s)	Sample		Margin of error	Yes (Note: The figures provided under Yes are represented by poll responses that include yes, favor, and support.)	No (Note: The figures provided under No are represented by poll responses that include no and oppose.)	Undecided (Note: The figures provided under Undecided are represented by poll responses that include undecided, don't know, and not sure.)	Lead	Ref.
Research Co.	November 4–6, 2022	420	DV	Unknown	69%	31%	—	38%	
Research Co.	November 4–6, 2022	450	LV	± 4.6%	64%	29%	7%	35%	
Rasmussen Reports	October 12, 2022	1,216	LV	± 3.0%	59%	33%	8%	26%	
Carnegie Endowment/YouGov	September 9–26, 2022	927	A (Note: The poll conducted by the Carnegie Endowment and YouGov was a survey among Asian Americans in California and not representative of all Californians.)	± 3.0%	65%	17%	18%	48%	
Public Policy Institute of California	September 2–11, 2022	1,060	LV	± 5.4%	69%	25%	6%	44%	
Berkeley IGS	August 9–15, 2022	9,254	RV	± 2.0%	71%	18%	10%	53%	
Rasmussen Reports	August 10–11, 2022	1,006	LV	± 2.0%	66%	27%	7%	39%	
Probolsky Research	August 4–9, 2022	900	LV	± 3.3%	67%	29%	4%	38%	
Public Policy Institute of California	July 8–15, 2022	1,648	A	± 3.4%	68%	29%	2%	39%	
Public Policy Institute of California	July 8–15, 2022	1,132	LV	± 4.1%	73%	27%	1%	46%	

== Voting ==
Sample ballot for San Diego County voters featuring Proposition 1

Voting on Proposition 1 coincided with all other elections in California on November 8, 2022, with polls open from 7:00 am to 8:00 pm PST (UTC−8). All active registered voters in California were mailed a ballot ahead of the election, which began no later than October 10. For a ballot to be considered valid, it had to be returned and postmarked on or before November 8 and received by November 15. The ballot could also have been delivered in-person at a ballot drop box, polling place, or county elections office by 8:00 pm on November 8. Throughout California, there was at least one ballot drop box for every 15,000 registered voters. Voters had the ability to track their ballots' status to ensure that they were received and counted.

The deadline for eligible voters to register online or by mail was 15 days before the election – October 24. Eligible voters who registered after the October 24 deadline had to do so at a county elections office, polling place, or vote center to cast their vote in the election, but had until 8:00 pm on November 8 to do so. Voters in 27 of the 58 counties had the option to vote early in person from October 29 to November 8. According to the California Voter Bill of Rights, people who were already in line by 8:00 pm to vote can cast one, even if it was past the deadline. California voters were able to receive information and assistance in 10 languages: English, Spanish, Chinese, Hindi, Japanese, Khmer, Korean, Tagalog, Thai and Vietnamese.

Several different tabulation systems were used in the election by the state's 58 counties, such as Dominion ImageCast, Hart Verity, and ES&S EVS. Los Angeles County used its own publicly-owned system, VSAP, for tabulation.

== Results ==
For Proposition 1 to pass, it needed approval from a majority of the voters. By the time polls closed, about a third of the votes had already been counted from those cast in early voting and showed Yes votes outnumbering No about two votes to one. On the night of the election, multiple news outlets called the results in favor of the Yes vote, with NBC News doing so at 8:40 pm PST, ABC News by 8:50 pm, and the Associated Press at 10:38 pm. CNN made the same projection at 2:18 am on November 9. Secretary of State Shirley Weber certified the election on December 16, affirming the passage of Proposition 1. With the ballot measure passing, it entered into effect on December 21.

=== Statewide ===
Proposition 1
Choice	Votes	%
For	7,176,888	66.88
Against	3,553,564	33.12
Total	10,730,452	100.00
Valid votes	10,730,452	96.27
Invalid/blank votes	416,168	3.73
Total votes	11,146,620	100.00
Registered voters/turnout	21,940,274	50.80
Source: Statement of Vote at the Wayback Machine (archived September 23, 2023)

Proposition 1 results (excluding invalid votes)
Yes; 7,176,888 (66.9%)	No; 3,553,564 (33.1%)
▲50%

=== By county ===
County					Votes			Registered		Eligible	
County	Yes		No		Votes			Registered		Eligible	
County	Votes	Per.	Votes	Per.	Valid	Invalid	Total	Total	Turnout	Total	Turnout
Alameda (Note: Voters in the following 27 counties had the option to vote early in person from October 29 to November 8: Alameda, Amador, Butte, Calaveras, El Dorado, Fresno, Kings, Los Angeles, Madera, Marin, Mariposa, Merced, Napa, Nevada, Orange, Riverside, Sacramento, San Benito, San Diego, San Mateo, Santa Clara, Santa Cruz, Sonoma, Stanislaus, Tuolumne, Ventura, and Yolo.)	390,357	83.90%	74,916	16.10%	465,273	30,852	496,125	931,130	53.28%	1,140,774	43.49%
Alpine	427	71.64%	169	28.36%	596	27	623	915	68.09%	1,015	61.38%
Amador	8,974	49.33%	9,216	50.67%	18,190	728	18,918	25,954	72.89%	29,593	63.93%
Butte	41,855	59.01%	29,072	40.99%	70,927	2,284	73,211	123,935	59.07%	164,755	44.44%
Calaveras	10,532	50.64%	10,266	49.36%	20,798	768	21,566	32,172	67.03%	36,563	58.98%
Colusa	2,490	45.86%	2,939	54.14%	5,429	188	5,617	10,144	55.37%	13,214	42.51%
Contra Costa	290,527	75.64%	93,584	24.36%	384,111	10,042	394,153	701,969	56.15%	803,842	49.03%
Del Norte	4,216	51.52%	3,967	48.48%	8,183	267	8,450	14,943	56.55%	19,219	43.97%
El Dorado	47,021	54.13%	39,853	45.87%	86,874	2,949	89,823	138,537	64.84%	145,060	61.92%
Fresno	114,340	53.44%	99,612	46.56%	213,952	7,467	221,419	500,076	44.28%	642,412	34.47%
Glenn	3,532	45.77%	4,185	54.23%	7,717	269	7,986	14,346	55.67%	18,865	42.33%
Humboldt	34,634	73.34%	12,587	26.66%	47,221	1,520	48,741	84,756	57.51%	107,016	45.55%
Imperial	15,962	54.33%	13,419	45.67%	29,381	1,005	30,386	86,942	34.95%	109,738	27.69%
Inyo	4,207	59.34%	2,883	40.66%	7,090	487	7,577	10,729	70.62%	14,619	51.83%
Kern	87,624	47.41%	97,194	52.59%	184,818	5,887	190,705	435,872	43.75%	561,276	33.98%
Kings	12,148	45.72%	14,420	54.28%	26,568	557	27,125	61,535	44.08%	86,806	31.25%
Lake	12,336	62.40%	7,432	37.60%	19,768	594	20,362	37,154	54.80%	51,231	39.75%
Lassen	3,522	39.33%	5,434	60.67%	8,956	315	9,271	14,757	62.82%	21,275	43.58%
Los Angeles	1,710,784	72.91%	635,668	27.09%	2,346,452	110,249	2,456,701	5,601,835	43.86%	6,658,099	36.90%
Madera	16,918	46.40%	19,544	53.60%	36,462	883	37,345	72,865	51.25%	93,789	39.82%
Marin	101,549	85.75%	16,872	14.25%	118,421	2,981	121,402	170,545	71.18%	185,951	65.29%
Mariposa	3,936	50.99%	3,783	49.01%	7,719	209	7,928	11,558	68.59%	13,813	57.40%
Mendocino	22,207	74.53%	7,590	25.47%	29,797	1,211	31,008	53,105	58.39%	67,114	46.20%
Merced	28,957	53.43%	25,237	46.57%	54,194	1,656	55,850	124,659	44.80%	172,198	32.43%
Modoc	1,347	40.49%	1,980	59.51%	3,327	114	3,441	5,197	66.21%	6,740	51.05%
Mono	3,118	69.21%	1,387	30.79%	4,505	128	4,633	7,710	60.09%	9,399	49.29%
Monterey	71,966	71.31%	28,956	28.69%	100,922	2,225	103,147	209,045	49.34%	251,193	41.06%
Napa	36,414	73.16%	13,358	26.84%	49,772	1,016	50,788	83,480	60.84%	97,321	52.19%
Nevada	32,680	65.90%	16,907	34.10%	49,587	1,783	51,370	74,488	68.96%	81,891	62.73%
Orange	550,256	57.16%	412,417	42.84%	962,673	31,604	994,277	1,817,583	54.70%	2,203,252	45.13%
Placer	97,558	54.85%	80,296	45.15%	177,854	6,653	184,507	279,016	66.13%	301,467	61.20%
Plumas	4,557	53.82%	3,910	46.18%	8,467	254	8,721	13,848	62.98%	15,245	57.21%
Riverside	330,757	56.50%	254,691	43.50%	585,448	19,169	604,617	1,310,505	46.14%	1,637,165	36.93%
Sacramento	306,720	68.17%	143,182	31.83%	449,902	34,413	484,315	865,225	55.98%	1,112,665	43.53%
San Benito	12,486	64.71%	6,809	35.29%	19,295	550	19,845	37,750	52.57%	43,559	45.56%
San Bernardino	235,743	53.40%	205,726	46.60%	441,469	17,477	458,946	1,138,818	40.30%	1,472,696	31.16%
San Diego	648,166	64.34%	359,290	35.66%	1,007,456	36,034	1,043,490	1,924,634	54.22%	2,349,554	44.41%
San Francisco	270,509	89.52%	31,657	10.48%	302,166	7,905	310,071	498,197	62.24%	660,132	46.97%
San Joaquin	100,809	58.22%	72,332	41.78%	173,141	6,192	179,333	388,635	46.14%	509,377	35.21%
San Luis Obispo	72,266	61.72%	44,830	38.28%	117,096	4,060	121,156	182,340	66.45%	221,071	54.80%
San Mateo	193,880	79.59%	49,724	20.41%	243,604	8,629	252,233	432,734	58.29%	515,759	48.91%
Santa Barbara	90,581	68.00%	42,636	32.00%	133,217	3,827	137,044	237,759	57.64%	303,842	45.10%
Santa Clara	407,714	76.12%	127,939	23.88%	535,653	14,949	550,602	1,009,422	54.55%	1,259,821	43.70%
Santa Cruz	83,669	80.98%	19,654	19.02%	103,323	2,721	106,044	167,442	63.33%	197,659	53.65%
Shasta	30,005	45.08%	36,561	54.92%	66,566	2,420	68,986	111,628	61.80%	138,293	49.88%
Sierra	787	51.24%	749	48.76%	1,536	49	1,585	2,219	71.43%	2,673	59.30%
Siskiyou	9,118	52.73%	8,175	47.27%	17,293	614	17,907	28,725	62.34%	34,986	51.18%
Solano	86,268	66.92%	42,646	33.08%	128,914	3,330	132,244	260,358	50.79%	318,503	41.52%
Sonoma	155,741	79.38%	40,453	20.62%	196,194	4,153	200,347	304,017	65.90%	356,905	56.13%
Stanislaus	65,342	50.98%	62,830	49.02%	128,172	3,970	132,142	282,393	46.79%	363,595	36.34%
Sutter	13,334	49.35%	13,685	50.65%	27,019	1,502	28,521	52,896	53.92%	65,666	43.43%
Tehama	8,911	44.31%	11,199	55.69%	20,110	709	20,819	37,131	56.07%	46,966	44.33%
Trinity	2,664	59.27%	1,831	40.73%	4,495	113	4,608	7,309	63.05%	13,168	34.99%
Tulare	40,882	45.54%	48,891	54.46%	89,773	2,631	92,404	208,863	44.24%	287,885	32.10%
Tuolumne	11,554	51.15%	11,035	48.85%	22,589	893	23,482	35,355	66.42%	43,682	53.76%
Ventura	172,853	63.23%	100,532	36.77%	273,385	10,628	284,013	505,110	56.23%	584,861	48.56%
Yolo	49,468	73.66%	17,689	26.34%	67,157	1,637	68,794	118,797	57.91%	155,109	44.35%
Yuba	9,710	49.86%	9,765	50.14%	19,475	411	19,886	41,212	48.25%	56,463	35.22%
California	7,176,888	66.88%	3,553,564	33.12%	10,730,452	416,168	11,146,620	21,940,274	50.80%	26,876,800	41.47%

=== By congressional district ===
The Yes vote won 49 out of 52 congressional districts, including nine that elected Republicans.

District					2022 US House elections			
District	Yes		No		2022 US House elections		2022 US Senate elections	
District	Votes	Per.	Votes	Per.	Party control	Representative	Padilla	Meuser
1st	121,498	50.3%	120,005	49.7%	Republican	Doug LaMalfa	36.3%	63.7%
2nd	245,362	79.4%	63,684	20.6%	Democratic	Jared Huffman	72.7%	27.3%
3rd	190,963	57.9%	138,974	42.1%	Republican	Kevin Kiley	45.9%	54.1%
4th	189,413	72.4%	72,076	27.6%	Democratic	Mike Thompson	65.7%	34.3%
5th	141,916	50.4%	139,656	49.6%	Republican	Tom McClintock	39.7%	60.3%
6th	135,347	65.8%	70,207	34.2%	Democratic	Ami Bera	57.0%	43.0%
7th	151,985	72.3%	58,251	27.7%	Democratic	Doris Matsui	66.1%	33.9%
8th	148,379	76.8%	44,935	23.2%	Democratic	John Garamendi	75.4%	24.6%
9th	99,644	58.0%	72,211	42.0%	Democratic	Josh Harder	50.8%	49.2%
10th	207,587	74.2%	72,001	25.8%	Democratic	Mark DeSaulnier	66.3%	33.7%
11th	247,098	90.3%	26,524	9.7%	Democratic	Nancy Pelosi	86.5%	13.5%
12th	215,753	91.7%	19,448	8.3%	Democratic	Barbara Lee	90.7%	9.3%
13th	70,438	52.9%	62,607	47.1%	Republican	John Duarte	49.0%	51.0%
14th	145,970	75.5%	47,302	24.5%	Democratic	Eric Swalwell	69.6%	30.4%
15th	173,889	79.4%	45,147	20.6%	Democratic	Kevin Mullin	76.6%	23.4%
16th	207,814	79.4%	53,972	20.6%	Democratic	Anna Eshoo	74.1%	25.9%
17th	138,899	76.3%	43,074	23.7%	Democratic	Ro Khanna	71.3%	28.7%
18th	107,258	70.5%	44,879	29.5%	Democratic	Zoe Lofgren	68.0%	32.0%
19th	207,437	73.1%	76,460	26.9%	Democratic	Jimmy Panetta	67.2%	32.8%
20th	97,948	43.2%	128,783	56.8%	Republican	Kevin McCarthy	32.3%	67.7%
21st	70,056	56.5%	53,957	43.5%	Democratic	Jim Costa	53.5%	46.5%
22nd	55,652	53.9%	47,640	46.1%	Republican	David Valadao	51.2%	48.8%
23rd	83,223	49.5%	84,821	50.5%	Republican	Jay Obernolte	40.8%	59.2%
24th	176,732	67.6%	84,592	32.4%	Democratic	Salud Carbajal	60.8%	39.2%
25th	88,985	58.5%	63,063	41.5%	Democratic	Raul Ruiz	54.6%	45.4%
26th	152,465	62.9%	90,031	37.1%	Democratic	Julia Brownley	55.2%	44.8%
27th	114,205	58.6%	80,538	41.4%	Republican	Mike Garcia	51.5%	48.5%
28th	156,909	69.6%	68,573	30.4%	Democratic	Judy Chu	64.6%	35.4%
29th	99,250	74.7%	33,671	25.3%	Democratic	Tony Cárdenas	76.1%	23.9%
30th	187,569	81.2%	43,351	18.8%	Democratic	Adam Schiff	77.0%	23.0%
31st	95,653	61.9%	58,762	38.1%	Democratic	Grace Napolitano	60.7%	39.3%
32nd	189,174	77.0%	56,566	23.0%	Democratic	Brad Sherman	68.7%	31.3%
33rd	76,117	57.8%	55,501	42.2%	Democratic	Pete Aguilar	56.8%	43.2%
34th	104,455	81.0%	24,511	19.0%	Democratic	Jimmy Gomez	83.1%	16.9%
35th	75,765	57.6%	55,733	42.4%	Democratic	Norma Torres	57.3%	42.7%
36th	218,748	77.3%	64,194	22.7%	Democratic	Ted Lieu	69.4%	30.6%
37th	121,494	84.0%	23,194	16.0%	Democratic	Sydney Kamlager-Dove	86.4%	13.6%
38th	106,741	61.3%	67,397	38.7%	Democratic	Linda Sánchez	59.7%	40.3%
39th	78,348	58.9%	54,570	41.1%	Democratic	Mark Takano	56.5%	43.5%
40th	154,609	54.4%	129,355	45.6%	Republican	Young Kim	45.9%	54.1%
41st	132,856	56.1%	104,133	43.9%	Republican	Ken Calvert	46.8%	53.2%
42nd	102,344	70.4%	43,072	29.6%	Democratic	Robert Garcia	69.0%	31.0%
43rd	92,916	76.4%	28,648	23.6%	Democratic	Maxine Waters	80.0%	20.0%
44th	98,171	69.7%	42,679	30.3%	Democratic	Nanette Barragán	71.7%	28.3%
45th	118,708	55.1%	96,680	44.9%	Republican	Michelle Steel	49.3%	50.7%
46th	76,148	60.4%	49,897	39.6%	Democratic	Lou Correa	60.6%	39.4%
47th	160,741	61.2%	101,846	38.8%	Democratic	Katie Porter	50.8%	49.2%
48th	126,747	49.6%	128,824	50.4%	Republican	Darrell Issa	39.8%	60.2%
49th	175,573	61.0%	112,243	39.0%	Democratic	Mike Levin	52.2%	47.8%
50th	188,496	70.8%	77,927	29.2%	Democratic	Scott Peters	62.7%	37.3%
51st	156,190	67.4%	75,649	32.6%	Democratic	Sara Jacobs	61.2%	38.8%
52nd	97,250	65.3%	51,750	34.7%	Democratic	Juan Vargas	64.8%	35.2%
California	7,176,888	66.9%	3,553,564	33.1%	Democratic	40 D–12 R	60.9%	39.1%

== Aftermath ==
=== Reactions ===
Democratic candidates across California wore pink on November 8 in support of Proposition 1. After Proposition 1's outcome was projected by several media outlets, the Yes campaign declared victory, with Atkins and Hicks stating in part, "Californians didn't just vote to protect abortion – they showed up overwhelming to make it clear: Abortion is a fundamental right." Newsom called California's protection of abortion rights a "point of pride", further stating that the voters "affirmed we are a true freedom state". Timmaraju said Proposition 1's passage ensures that "[n]o matter where [Californians] live, no matter who is in office — [Californians'] right to decide when and how to start or expand a family should be [theirs and theirs] alone."

Catherine Hadro, the No campaign's media relations director, issued a statement on the outcome, "The battle now shifts to the courts and the legislature. Our coalition will fight all attempts to reinterpret rights or conform state law to what is now known as the nation's most extreme abortion amendment." The California Catholic Conference said that Proposition 1 "opened the door to unregulated, late-term abortions, all at taxpayer expense, redirecting state funding away from solutions for the greatest needs of California families". On the night of the election, the California Family Council held a vigil at the California State Capitol. Cordileone stated that "Prop. 1 will inevitably be challenged in the courts".

Following Proposition 1's passage, the Guttmacher Institute reclassified California's abortion policy as "very protective", the second-highest level of protection categorized by Guttmacher.

=== National effect ===
Along with California, voters in Michigan and Vermont affirmed the right to an abortion in their state constitutions respectively with Proposal 3 and Proposal 5, becoming the first three states in the nation to do so. In Kentucky and Montana, the former's Amendment 2 and the latter's Legislative Referendum 131, which would have restricted abortion rights, were rejected by the two states' voters. As such, all five states voted to preserve abortion rights. Based on the success of Proposition 1, similar measures in Michigan and Vermont, and the rejection of restrictive ballot measures in Kentucky and Montana, some abortion rights groups planned on putting abortion ballot measures up for a vote in other states in future elections, with American Civil Liberties Union executive director Anthony Romero stating, "Let's go to states, and let's prove that we can win in some challenging environment. Let's put this to the people." The ACLU and the Fairness Project planned such measures in Arkansas, Florida, Missouri, Ohio, Oklahoma, and South Dakota. Susan B. Anthony Pro-Life America president Marjorie Dannenfelser stated her belief that other states may try to replicate Proposition 1.

Rene Almeling and Adora Svitak, respectively a sociology professor and graduate student at Yale University, wrote that a national abortion ban remained a possibility, even after California's passage of Proposition 1, if Republicans regain full control of the federal government in the 2024 elections. Northeastern University law professor Martha Davis stated that the failure to pass abortion restrictions in Republican-leaning states such as Kansas and Kentucky, make it more difficult for Republicans in Congress to legislate federal restrictions that undermine and override Proposition 1 and constitutional abortion protections in other states. In response to the results of the abortion ballot measures, Kilgore wrote that "[t]he door to state abortion bans opened by the U.S. Supreme Court earlier this year when it reversed Roe v. Wade is being closed by voters whenever they have the opportunity to weigh in on the matter."

=== Analysis ===
Quartz's Annalisa Merelli stated that "the midterm results so far suggest that supporting measures against reproductive rights proved counterproductive for Republicans, who had better success galvanizing the anti-choice vote when the right to abortions was still a constitutional guarantee nationwide." Among some figures in the anti-abortion movement, such as Marilyn Musgrave, Republican reticence toward discussing abortion resulted in measures like Proposition 1 passing. Franklin said Proposition 1 "will get media attention and people will be made more aware that California is a place they can go." Jackie Fortiér, a reporter for KPCC, wrote that the "[c]ourts may have to sort out the details later, but passage of the constitutional amendment cements California as an abortion sanctuary." SFGATE writer Sam Moore said Proposition 1 may have little effect in rural California counties, particularly Tulare County, which lacks a Planned Parenthood clinic due to local conservative opposition. A 2019 study by the Kaiser Family Foundation determined that the county's residents had to travel at least 50 miles to access an abortion provider.

Bay Area News Group reporter Marisa Kendall stated that support for Proposition 1 was tied to Newsom's support in California, "Newsom backed Prop. 1 from the beginning, and experts say its runaway victory is a nod toward the governor's continuing power and influence." Kendall's colleague, Harriet Blair Rowan, found that the Yes votes for Proposition 1 was one of the cheapest among the state's other ballot propositions when taking campaign spending into account, standing at $2.85 per Yes vote, second only to the Yes votes for Proposition 28 and 50 times less than the Yes votes for Proposition 27. A KFF and AP VoteCast poll conducted between October 31 and November 8 found that 44% of California voters and 55% of California women aged 18–49 said Roe's overturning was a major factor in getting them to vote. In some places, the proposition earned support in conservative counties where anti-abortion candidates won, with Republican political consultant Mike Madrid stating, "What you saw on election night was the defection of Republican college-educated women voting against the Republican Party and voting pro-choice where they could." Based on votes counted by November 15, Proposition 1 outperformed California's statewide Democratic candidates, with the same occurring in Michigan and Vermont.

Compared to the other ballot measures, Proposition 1 was the most popular across the state, particularly along the Pacific coast, where Democrats generally outnumber Republicans. Additionally, the ballot measure's performance in each county nearly matched Newsom's performance in the gubernatorial election. Melanie Mason, Seema Mehta, and Hannah Fry wrote in the Los Angeles Times that "Democrats did not see the same electoral boost in California congressional races as they did in states where abortion rights [were] more threatened, such as Michigan." After the election was certified by the Secretary of State, Political Data Inc. vice president Paul Mitchell credited Proposition 1 for preventing lower voter turnout in the midterm election.

=== Subsequent legislation ===
In 2023, the California State Legislature introduced a series of abortion-related legislation designed to further entrench reproductive rights in the state. Atkins proposed two bills that would prevent insurers from inflicting penalties on California providers who perform abortions and allow physician assistants to perform first-trimester abortions without a physician supervising them. Legislation introduced by Assemblymembers Tasha Boerner and Rebecca Bauer-Kahan would redefine eligibility from "pregnant women" to "pregnant people" to ensure abortion access for transgender men and non-binary people. Assemblymember Mia Bonta put forward a bill prohibiting reverse keyword and geofence warrants for California law enforcement and disallowing California-based companies from complying with them, which could be used to identify people who searched for or sought out abortion services.

== See also ==
- Abortion in California
- Preceding international referendums
  - Thirty-sixth Amendment of the Constitution of Ireland – 2018 amendment liberalising abortion laws
  - 2021 Gibraltar abortion referendum
  - 2021 San Marino abortion referendum
- 2022 United States referendums
  - 2022 Kansas abortion referendum
  - 2022 Kentucky Amendment 2
  - 2022 Michigan Proposal 3
  - 2022 Montana Legislative Referendum 131
  - 2022 Vermont Proposal 5
- 2023 United States referendums
  - November 2023 Ohio Issue 1 – Referendum to enshrine abortion and contraception in the state constitution
- 2024 United States referendums
  - 2024 Arizona Proposition 139
  - 2024 Colorado Amendment 79
  - 2024 Florida Amendment 4
  - 2024 Maryland Question 1
  - 2024 Missouri Amendment 3
  - 2024 Montana Initiative 128
  - 2024 Nebraska Initiative 439
  - 2024 Nevada Question 6
  - 2024 New York Proposal 1
  - 2024 South Dakota Amendment G
- 2026 United States referendums
  - 2026 Idaho Proposition 1
  - 2026 Missouri Amendment 3
  - 2026 Nevada Question 6
  - 2026 Virginia Question 1
