= 2022 Montana Legislative Referendum 131 =

Legislative Referendum 131
- November 8, 2022
- An act adopting the born-alive infant protection act; providing that infants born alive, including infants born alive after an abortion, are legal persons; requiring health care providers to take necessary actions to preserve the life of a born-alive infant; providing a penalty; providing that the proposed act be submitted to the qualified electors of Montana; and providing an effective date.

Results
| Choice | Votes | % |
|---|---|---|
| Yes | 213,001 | 47.45% |
| No | 235,904 | 52.55% |
| Total votes | 448,905 | 100.00% |

Yes
80–90%
70–80%
60–70%
50–60%
No
90–100%
80–90%
70–80%
60–70%
50–60%
Tie
50%
No votes

The 2022 Montana Legislative Referendum 131, commonly known as the Born-Alive referendum, was a legislatively-referred state statute in the state of Montana, which was voted on alongside the 2022 elections in the state. The statute, which sought to define certain infants as "born alive" – including following abortions – and compel medical practitioners to provide life-sustaining care to them no matter the prognosis, was rejected by voters.

Montana was one of six states to vote on an abortion-related referendum as part of the 2022 elections, alongside California, Michigan, Kansas, Kentucky, and Vermont. Although the vote was held following the United States Supreme Court's decision in Dobbs v. Jackson Women's Health Organization, the Montana Legislature passed the bill before the decision had been taken.

== Background ==
House Bill 167, referred to as the Born-Alive Infant Protection Act was introduced to the Montana House of Representatives by Matt Regier on 14 January 2021. It provided for a referendum on defining "infants born alive, including infants born alive after an abortion" as legal persons, and that healthcare providers should "take necessary actions to preserve the life of a born-alive infant", with penalties of a $50,000 fine and up to 20 years in prison.

The bill passed on party lines in the House and Senate, with only 1 defection in either party at the final readings.

=== Legislative votes ===
House of Representatives vote – 3rd reading
| Party | Votes for | Votes against |
|---|---|---|
| Republican (67) | 67 | – |
| Democratic (33) | 1: Dave Fern | 32 |
| Total (100) | 68 | 32 |

Senate vote – 3rd reading
| Party | Votes for | Votes against |
|---|---|---|
| Republican (31) | 30 | 1: Jeffrey Welborn |
| Democratic (19) | – | 19 |
| Total (50) | 30 | 20 |

House of Representatives vote – 3rd reading as amended by Senate
| Party | Votes for | Votes against |
|---|---|---|
| Republican (67) | 66 | 1: Edward Buttrey |
| Democratic (33) | – | 33 |
| Total (50) | 66 | 34 |

== Contents ==
The proposal appeared on the ballot as follows:

AN ACT ADOPTING THE BORN-ALIVE INFANT PROTECTION ACT; PROVIDING THAT INFANTS BORN ALIVE, INCLUDING INFANTS BORN ALIVE AFTER AN ABORTION, ARE LEGAL PERSONS; REQUIRING HEALTH CARE PROVIDERS TO TAKE NECESSARY ACTIONS TO PRESERVE THE LIFE OF A BORN-ALIVE INFANT; PROVIDING A PENALTY; PROVIDING THAT THE PROPOSED ACT BE SUBMITTED TO THE QUALIFIED ELECTORS OF MONTANA; AND PROVIDING AN EFFECTIVE DATE.

This Act legally protects born-alive infants by imposing criminal penalties on health care providers who do not act to preserve the life of such infants, including infants born during an attempted abortion. A bornalive infant is entitled to medically appropriate care and treatment. A health care provider shall take medically appropriate and reasonable actions to preserve the life and health of a born-alive infant.

A born-alive infant means an infant who breathes, has a beating heart, or has definite movement of voluntary muscles, after the complete expulsion or extraction from the mother.

A health care provider found guilty of failing to take medically appropriate and reasonable actions to preserve a born-alive infant's life under this Act faces punishment of a fine up to $50,000 or imprisonment up to 20 years, or both.

== Campaign ==
Committees for both sides in the referendum were entitled to put forward arguments and rebuttals in the voter information pamphlet.

=== Opposition ===
Opposition in the referendum came from both the medical community and pro-choice activists. The Montana Medical Association supported a "no" vote as the organisation believed it would limit the options available should an infant be born with little chance of survival. It was noted that cases where fetuses survive an abortion before dying are rare and often the result of other health conditions, meaning the bill was largely unnecessary.

Compassion for Montana Families was the main opposition group in the referendum. They argued that the bill was similar to the pro-life templates proposed by the Americans United for Life, and that the language would force medical practitioners to make decisions against the wishes of parents.

The arguments against LR-131 in the voter information pamphlet were written by Diane Sands, Alice Buckley, and Leah Miller.

==== Fundraising ====
Compassion for Montana Families: No on LR-131 raised a total of $1,047,955, with the largest single donor being the Families United for Freedom PAC. In addition, Montanans Against LR-131 raised $17,611.

=== Support ===
Catherine Glenn Foster, the President of Americans United for Life, spoke in favour of the bill during its passage in the House of Representatives. Supporters claimed that a "yes" victory would not reduce palliative care options for parents, and that existing laws did not adequately cover all cases.

The arguments for LR-131 in the voter information pamphlet were written by Tom McGillvray, Kerri Seekins-Crowe, and Jeff Laszloffy.

== Results ==
Legislative Referendum 131
| Choice | Votes | % |
|---|---|---|
| For | 213,001 | 47.45 |
| Against | 235,904 | 52.55 |
| Total | 448,905 | 100.00 |
| Registered voters/turnout | 762,959 | 58.84 |
Source: Secretary of State of Montana

=== By congressional district ===
"No" won one of two congressional districts, which elected a Republican.

| District | No | Yes | Representative |
|---|---|---|---|
| 1st | 56% | 44% | Ryan Zinke |
| 2nd | 49% | 51% | Matt Rosendale |
