= Vermont Senate Bill 37 =

2023 Vermont law

Vermont Senate
- Territorial extent: Vermont
- Enacted by: Vermont Senate
- Enacted: March 17, 2023
- Enacted by: Vermont House of Representatives
- Enacted: April 21, 2023
- Signed by: Phil Scott
- Signed: May 10, 2023

Legislative history

Initiating chamber: Vermont Senate
- Bill title: S.37
- Committee responsible: Health and Welfare
- First reading: January 25, 2023
- Second reading: March 15, 2023
- Third reading: March 17, 2023

Revising chamber: Vermont House of Representatives
- First reading: March 22, 2023
- Second reading: April 20, 2023
- Third reading: April 21, 2023
- Voting summary: 114 voted for; 24 voted against; 11 absent; 1 present not voting

Final stages
- Finally passed both chambers: April 27, 2023

Summary
- Protects patients of and providers of abortions and gender-affirming medical care from discipline or legal action, and requires insurance providers to cover such care.
- Status: In force

Vermont Senate Bill 37 (S.37) is a 2023 law in the state of Vermont that protects access to abortion and gender-affirming medical care. It was signed into law by Republican governor Phil Scott on May 10, 2023. It is sometimes referred to as a "shield" law and was passed alongside House Bill 89, a similar bill intended to work in tandem with S.37. Both laws turned Vermont into a "trans sanctuary" state, offering protections against legal action.

== Provisions ==
Senate Bill 37 prevents doctors and patients from facing discipline or lawsuits for providing gender-affirming care and reproductive care in the state. It also requires insurance providers to cover abortions and gender-affirming medical care, such as hormone replacement therapy (HRT) and puberty blockers.

== See also ==
- Abortion in Vermont
- LGBTQ rights in Vermont
