= Qato =

Qato is a surname. Notable people with the surname include:

- Klinti Qato (born 1999), Albanian footballer
- Kreshnik Qato (born 1978), Albanian boxer
- Sonila Qato (born 1977), Albanian politician and lawyer
- Khalil Qato, American Vascular Surgeon
- Danya Qato (born 1979), Pharmacist and epidemiologist.
- Dima Qato (born 1977), Pharmacoepidemiologist and pharmacist.
- Mohamad Qato (Qatu) (born 1963), American mechanical engineer.

== See also ==
- Cato (disambiguation)
