= Vassilios Papadopoulos =

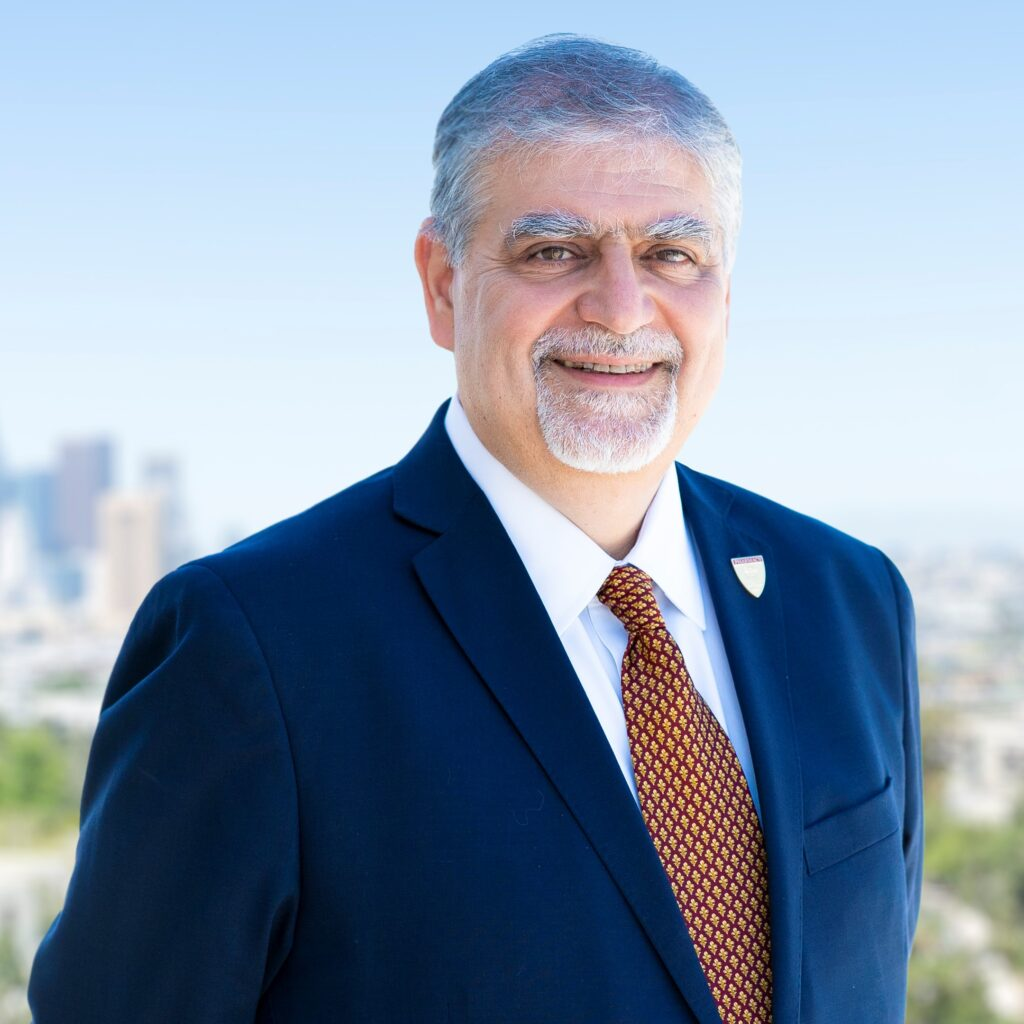
- Born: February 18, 1961 (age 65); Athens, Greece
- Title: Dean, USC Mann School; John Stauffer Decanal Chair in Pharmaceutical Sciences; Professor of Pharmacology and Pharmaceutical Sciences
- Spouse: Martine Culty

Academic background
- Education: PhD, University Pierre and Marie Curie

Vassilios Papadopoulos (born February 18, 1961) is a Greek-American scholar, researcher, inventor, professor, and university administrator who has served as dean of the USC Alfred E. Mann School of Pharmacy and Pharmaceutical Sciences at the University of Southern California in Los Angeles, California, since 2016. Previously, he was the associate vice president and director of the Biomedical Graduate Research Organization at Georgetown University from 2005 to 2007, and the executive director and chief scientific officer of the Research Institute of the McGill University Health Center from 2007 to 2015.

== Education ==
A graduate of the School of Pharmacy at the University of Athens, Papadopoulos holds a PhD in life sciences from the Université Pierre et Marie Curie in Paris. Papadopoulos continued his education as a post-doctoral researcher in France and Australia.

During his studies in pharmacy, Papadopoulos performed research at the Institute of Biological Research and Biotechnology, National Hellenic Research foundation in Athens, Greece where he focused on adrenal function, steroid hormones, and steroid receptors. At Université Pierre et Marie Curie, Papadopoulos engaged in research on estrogen production by Leydig cells and the paracrine regulation of Leydig cell function. Afterwards, Papadopoulos completed postdoctoral training at Prince of Wales Hospital, University of New South Wales, Sydney, Australia, researching the role of kinases and phosphatases in cholesterol transport and steroidogenesis.

== Career and research ==
Papadopoulos has published more than 400 papers and holds numerous patents. Papadopoulos has served on advisory committees as an industry leader and expert. He was elected to the National Academy of Medicine in 2026. He holds membership in the National Academies of Medicine and Pharmacy in France and is a fellow of the American Association for the Advancement of Science, the American Association of Pharmaceutical Scientists (AAPS), the Royal Society of Canada and the Canadian Academy of Health Sciences.

Papadopoulos' research focuses the cellular and molecular mechanisms responsible for the initiation and maintenance of steroid hormones in health and disease. He also examines the regulation of steroid biosynthesis, intracellular compartmentalization and homeostasis by hormones, chemicals, drugs, natural products and environmental factors. Additional research has focused on neurosteroids in the brain, adipose tissue, and nonalcoholic fatty liver disease.

In 1988, Papadopoulos was appointed to the faculty of Georgetown University School of Medicine where he continued research on the regulation of steroidogenesis to identify the mechanisms of action of DBI on mitochondrial steroid formation in steroidogenic cells. Later, Papadopoulos worked in collaboration with Patrizia Guarneri demonstrating that brain neurosteroid synthesis is under the control of translocator protein (TSPO) drug ligands and endogenous DBI, leading to the first pharmacological means to regulate steroid formation in the brain. His research on steroidogenesis continued at McGill, focusing on the mechanisms of mitochondrial cholesterol import and the synthesis of steroids and oxysterols in adipocytes and prostate. At USC his research focuses on Leydig cell development and the role of TSPO in non-alcoholic fatty liver disease.

=== Contributions to Science ===
Steroidogenesis

Papadopoulos' studies demonstrated that the development of Leydig cells and their ability to produce testosterone are controlled by intratesticular factors, and that TSPO is a high-affinity cholesterol and drug-binding protein which controls the rate of steroid formation in rodents and humans. Moreover, luteinizing hormone binding to Leydig cells' luteinizing hormone receptors induces the formation of a cytosolic and mitochondrial protein complex involved in cholesterol targeting to cytochrome P450 family 11 subfamily A member 1 (CYP11A1) in the mitochondria. This focus on steroidogenesis revealed the mitochondrial protein complex that drives cholesterol import, trafficking, and metabolism for steroid hormone production. The identification of the protein complex has led to molecular strategies to which increase steroid hormone formation.

Neurosteroid formation

Papadopoulos' neurosteroid research on inducing TSPO via drug ligands in glial cells increased neurosteroid formation and led to therapeutic application for the treatment of anxiety and other mental health pathologies. Thereafter, TSPO drug ligands reached the market for the treatment of anxiety and other neuropsychiatric disorders and neurological diseases. Currently, several TSPO ligands are in clinical development for neurological disorders, neuropsychiatric diseases, and cancer. Moreover, the identification of a brain-specific pathway for dehydroepiandrosterone steroid synthesis led to the development of a novel Alzheimer's blood diagnostic and the design of neuroprotective drugs.

Endocrine disrupting chemicals

At Georgetown, studies on in utero and adult in vivo exposure to endocrine disrupting phthalates and plasticizers with collaborator Martine Culty revealed an impact on testicular function. Endocrine disrupting chemicals such as phthalate DEHP and the non-phthalate DINCH reduced testosterone and aldosterone formation in adult rats. This work contributed to the body of evidence on the endocrine disrupting potential of plasticizers and their regulation by governmental agencies.

=== Administrative career ===
Between 2004 and 2007, Papadopoulos was the Associate Vice President for Research at Georgetown University Medical Center, and subsequently appointed the Director of Biomedical Graduate Research Organization. Under Papadopoulos' direction, the institution obtained an NIH-funded General Clinical Research Center and its first Clinical and Translational Science Award. Papadopoulos served from 2007 to 2016 as the executive director and chief scientific officer of the Research Institute of the McGill University Health Centre (RI-MUHC), one of Canada's largest research centers. At the RI-MUHC he was a professor in the faculty of medicine at McGill University and held a Canada Research Chair in Biochemical Pharmacology and the Phil Gold Chair in Medicine at McGill and the MUHC. Under Papadopoulos' tenure, more than $300 million federal and provincial grants were raised, resulting in the creating of a state-of-the-art clinical and biomedical research facility.

Since 2016, Papadopoulos has served as dean of the Alfred E. Mann School of Pharmacy and Pharmaceutical Sciences at University of Southern California, previously known as USC School of Pharmacy. In 2022, USC announced the $50 million renaming gift for the endowment of the USC Alfred E. Mann School of Pharmacy and Pharmaceutical Sciences, the largest gift for pharmacy school in California.
