= Martine Culty =

Scholar and professor

Martine Culty is a scholar and professor at the Alfred E. Mann School of Pharmacy and Pharmaceutical Sciences at the University of Southern California in Los Angeles, California.

== Career and Research ==
Martine Culty earned a Ph.D. in Molecular Chemistry from the University of Grenoble in Grenoble, France. Culty has held Associate Professor positions at Georgetown University, McGill University, and the University of Southern California.

Culty's research focuses on the effect of endocrine disruptors on testis development, as developmental exposure can lead to infertility or testicular tumors. Culty's research has identified various molecules and pathways that regulate gonocyte development which can be disrupted by estrogenic compounds, plasticizers, NSAIDs, and analgesic drugs. Her research has elucidated short-term and long-term effects of phthalate plasticizers on molecular targets of reproductive development, contributing to the body of evidence on the endocrine disrupting potential of these compounds and their regulation by governmental agencies.

Culty is an advocate for access to pharmaceutical education, participating in the collaborative Science Technology and Research/Engineering for Health Academy program between USC and Francisco Bravo Medical Magnet High School, which allows Francisco Bravo students to work with professors to support their scientific development. She has lectured for the Minority Opportunities in Research (MORE) Program at California State University, Los Angeles, which advocates for scientific research access for minority group members.
