= 2022 Vermont Proposal 2 =

2022 ballot initiative

Proposal 2
- November 8, 2022
- Slavery Prohibition Amendment

Results
Choice	Votes	%
Yes	238,466	88.71%
No	30,335	11.29%
Valid votes	268,801	92.07%
Invalid or blank votes	23,154	7.93%
Total votes	291,955	100.00%
County results
Yes
>90%
80–90%

The 2022 Prohibit Slavery and Indentured Servitude Amendment, officially titled the "Slavery Prohibition Amendment", and listed on the ballot as Proposition 2, was a legislatively referred constitutional amendment that was adopted on November 8, 2022, by a landslide majority of 88.7% of voters. It clarified the state's ban on slavery to include involuntary servitude and all other forms into the Constitution of Vermont. It was signed into the constitution by Republican governor Phil Scott on December 13th, 2022, along with Proposition 5.

== Background ==
Vermont was amongst the first territories in the United States to ban slavery in 1777, prior to its admission as a state in 1791. However, there were notable exceptions for those bound by consent or law to repay debts or fines.

== Text ==
To see if the voters will amend the Vermont Constitution by amending Article 1 of Chapter 1 to read:
Article 1. [All persons born free; their natural rights; slavery and indentured servitude prohibited]
That all persons are born equally free and independent, and have certain natural, inherent, and unalienable rights, amongst which are the enjoying and defending life and liberty, acquiring, possessing and protecting property, and pursuing and obtaining happiness and safety; therefore ~~no person born in this country, or brought from oversea, ought to be holden by law, to serve any person as a servant, slave or apprentice, after arriving to the age of twenty-one years, unless bound by the person's own consent, after arriving to such age, or bound by law for the payment of debts, damages, fines, costs, or the like~~ slavery and indentured servitude in any form are prohibited.

== See also ==
- 2022 Vermont Proposition 5
- 2022 Vermont elections
- History of slavery in Vermont
