= 2022 California Proposition 27 =

Referendum to legalize online sports betting

Proposition 27
- November 8, 2022
- Allows Online and Mobile Sports Wagering. Initiative Constitutional Amendment and Statute.

Results
Choice	Votes	%
Yes	1,906,342	17.72%
No	8,849,206	82.28%
Valid votes	10,755,548	96.49%
Invalid or blank votes	391,072	3.51%
Total votes	11,146,620	100.00%
Registered voters/turnout	21,940,274	50.8%

No
80–90%
70–80%
- Source: Statement of Vote at the Wayback Machine (archived September 23, 2023)

Proposition 27, also known as the Legalize Sports Betting and Revenue for Homelessness Prevention Fund Initiative, was a California ballot proposition that was defeated overwhelmingly by voters in the general election on November 8, 2022. The proposition would have legalized online and mobile sports betting platforms that are associated with an existing gaming tribe.

Proposition 27 was most notable for its large amount of advertising spending and very large margin of defeat; its vote of 17.72% in favor to 82.28% against marked it as one of the largest margins of defeat for any proposition in history. With both Proposition 27 and the similar Proposition 26 failing, sports betting remained illegal in California.

== Background ==
Following the US Supreme Court's decision to strike down a federal sports betting ban, each state has the ability to regulate sports betting. Sports betting is illegal in California under existing state law. For the 2022 election, Proposition 27 was one of two ballot propositions to legalize sports betting, the other being Proposition 26.

Under Proposition 27, sports betting companies who partner with a Native American tribe could offer online sports betting to those 21 or older. To operate in the state, a betting company must either be operating in five other states plus run twelve casinos, or pay a licensing fee of $100 million.

California's gambling system has long operated solely on land-based tribal casinos which are present in sovereign territories. As a result of their locations, they are immune to prohibition laws in California. Tribal casinos generate 8 billion dollars in annual revenue according to the American Gaming Association. Alternative options such as "Card Rooms" do operate throughout the state and often refer to themselves as "casinos". However these cardrooms do not have slot machines, while tribal casinos do have slot machines, they are also absent of craps, roulette and other house-banked table games.

== Contents ==
The proposition appeared on the ballot as follows:

Allows Online and Mobile Sports Wagering. Initiative Constitutional Amendment and Statute.

Allows Indian tribes and affiliated businesses to operate online/mobile sports wagering outside tribal lands. Directs revenues to regulatory costs, homelessness programs, nonparticipating tribes. Fiscal Impact: Increased state revenues, possibly in the hundreds of millions of dollars but not likely to exceed $500 million annually. Some revenues would support state regulatory costs, possibly reaching the mid-tens of millions of dollars annually.

== Support and opposition ==
=== Support ===
Supporters of the proposition argued legalizing online and mobile sports betting would provide more funding for homeless programs. There is also an environmental impact both negative and positive associated with Prop. 27.

Supporters

Mayors

- Jerry Dyer, Mayor of Fresno
- Libby Schaaf, Mayor of Oakland
- Robert Garcia, Mayor of Long Beach
- Darrell Steinberg, Mayor of Sacramento

Tribes

- Santa Rosa Rancheria Tachi Yokut tribe
- Middletown Rancheria of Pomo Indians
- Big Valley Ranch of Pomo Indians

Other

- Major League Baseball

=== Opposition ===
Opponents of Proposition 27 argued that legalizing mobile and online sports betting would impede on tribal sovereignty and that only major gaming companies would benefit from the legalization as written.

Opponents

Statewide officials

- Gavin Newsom, Governor of California
- Eleni Kounalakis, Lieutenant Governor of California

Political parties

- California Democratic Party
- California Republican Party

Labor unions

- California Teachers Association
- Communication Workers of America
- United Food and Commercial Workers

Tribes

- Over 50 Native American tribes

== Polling ==
Poll source	Date(s) administered	Sample size	Margin of error	Yes	No	Undecided	Lead
UC Berkeley IGS	November 4, 2022	7,602	± 2%	22%	64%	14%	42%
UC Berkeley IGS	October 4, 2022	8,725	± 2.5%	27%	53%	20%	26%
Public Policy Institute of California	September 2–11, 2022	1,705	± 3.9%	34%	54%	12%	20%

== See also ==
- List of California ballot propositions
