= New Mexico Senate Bill 13 =

2023 New Mexico law

New Mexico Legislature
- Long title: AN ACT RELATING TO HEALTH; PROTECTING THE PRIVACY OF PROVIDERS, RECIPIENTS AND OTHERS ENGAGING IN REPRODUCTIVE AND GENDER-AFFIRMING HEALTH CARE; PROTECTING PROVIDERS, RECIPIENTS AND OTHERS ENGAGING IN REPRODUCTIVE AND GENDER-AFFIRMING HEALTH CARE FROM CERTAIN CIVIL OR CRIMINAL LIABILITY OR PROFESSIONAL DISCIPLINARY ACTION; PROVIDING FOR ENFORCEMENT; IMPOSING PENALTIES; PRESCRIBING RELIEF.
- Territorial extent: New Mexico
- Enacted by: New Mexico Senate
- Enacted: March 10, 2023
- Enacted by: New Mexico House of Representatives
- Enacted: March 17, 2023
- Signed by: Michelle Lujan Grisham
- Signed: April 5, 2023
- Effective: June 16, 2023

Legislative history

First chamber: New Mexico Senate
- Introduced: February 14, 2023
- Third reading: March 10, 2023
- Voting summary: 26 voted for; 16 voted against

Second chamber: New Mexico House of Representatives
- Third reading: March 17, 2023
- Voting summary: 38 voted for; 30 voted against; 2 absent

Summary
- Protects access to abortion and gender-affirming care in New Mexico and prohibits the enforcement of out-of-state laws regarding such care.
- Status: In force

New Mexico Senate Bill 13 (SB 13) is a 2023 law in the state of New Mexico that codifies protections regarding gender-affirming medical care and abortion into state law. It was signed by Governor Michelle Lujan Grisham on April 5, 2023 and became law on June 16, 2023.

It followed an executive order by Grisham that provided most of the same legal protections. Senate Bill 13 is sometimes referred to as a "shield" law due to its protections from out-of-state law enforcement, thereby making New Mexico a refuge for transgender people seeking medical care and women seeking reproductive care.

== Provisions and enforcement ==
Senate Bill 13 prohibits the enforcement of out-of-state laws or orders regarding gender-affirming medical care and reproductive care, such as abortion. It prevents extradition to other states if providers or patients provide or receive such care in New Mexico. It also prohibits state agencies from cooperating with law enforcement if it involves such care. Subpoenas from out-of-state are generally ignored.

== See also ==
- Abortion in New Mexico
- LGBTQ rights in New Mexico
