= Mary Ziegler =

American legal historian (born 1982)

- Born: 1982 (age 43–44); Butte, Montana, U.S.
- Education: Harvard University (BA, JD)
- Occupation: Legal historian
- Employer: UC Davis School of Law
- Website: www.maryrziegler.com

Mary R. Ziegler (born 1982) is an American legal scholar. She is the Martin Luther King Jr. Professor of Law at the University of California, Davis, School of Law.

== Early life and education ==
Ziegler was born in 1982 and grew up in Montana. She graduated from Phillips Academy Andover in 2000 and Harvard College in 2004, where she published short stories in the Harvard Advocate and taught English as a second language to refugee students through the Refugee Summer Youth Enrichment program. Ziegler then earned her JD from Harvard Law School in 2007. She lives in California with her husband and daughter.

== Career ==
=== Law ===
After graduating from law school, Ziegler clerked for Justice John Dooley of the Vermont Supreme Court before completing a Ruebhausen postgraduate fellowship at Yale Law School. She began work as an assistant professor at the Saint Louis University School of Law in 2010 before joining the faculty at Florida State University College of Law in 2013. She was a visiting professor at Harvard Law School in spring 2022 and joined the law faculty at UC Davis in the fall of 2022. Ziegler was named a Guggenheim Fellow in 2023, and she also won the 2026 Award for Contributions to Public Policy from the Organization of American Historians. Ziegler was elected to the American Law Institute in 2026. She also won the 2026 John Lewis Award from the American Historical Association, which recognizes leadership at the "intersection of historical work, public engagement, and social justice."

=== Author ===
Ziegler is the author of multiple books on the history of abortion in the United States. Her first, After Roe: The Lost History of the Abortion Debate, won the Thomas J. Wilson Memorial Prize for best first manuscript in any discipline from Harvard University Press and was reviewed in The Economist. Her second book, Beyond Abortion: Roe v. Wade and the Fight for Privacy, was published by Harvard University Press in 2018 and was reviewed in The New York Review of Books. Her third book, Abortion and the Law in America: Roe v. Wade to the Present, was published by Cambridge University Press in 2020 and was reviewed in The Christian Science Monitor and The Washington Post.

In 2022, Ziegler published a reference book titled Reproduction and the Constitution in the United States with Routledge Press. Her book Dollars for Life: The Anti-Abortion Movement and the Fall of the Republican Establishment was published by Yale University Press in June 2022 and was reviewed in The New York Times. Kirkus Reviews called the book a "sober, knowledgeable scholarly analysis of a timely issue." In 2023, she published Roe: The History of a National Obsession. Her book entitled Personhood: The New Civil War over Reproduction was published by Yale Press in April 2025.

=== Public engagement ===
Ziegler has written on the legal history of abortion in the United States for The Atlantic, CNN, The New York Times, and The Washington Post. She also regularly comments on related topics for ABC News, The New Yorker, NPR, and PBS NewsHour. Pulitzer Prize winner David Garrow has called her "the premier historian of abortion in the post-Roe era."

== Bibliography ==
- After Roe: The Lost History of the Abortion Debate (2015)
- Beyond Abortion: Roe v. Wade and the Battle for Privacy (2018)
- Abortion and the Law in America: Roe v. Wade to the Present (2020)
- Reproduction and the Constitution in the United States (2022)
- Dollars for Life: The Anti-Abortion Movement and the Fall of the Republican Establishment (2022)
- Roe: The History of a National Obsession (2023)
- Personhood: The New Civil War over Reproduction (2025)
