= Abortion in Oklahoma =

Abortion in Oklahoma is illegal unless the abortion is necessary to save the life of a pregnant individual.

Oklahoma banned abortion in 1910 and it remained banned until the United States' Supreme Court 1973 decision Roe v. Wade. Oklahoma became the first state in the United States to institute a ban on abortion from fertilisation post-Roe v. Wade in May 2022, two months before the U.S. Supreme Court overturned the case in Dobbs v. Jackson Women's Health Organization. In March 2023, the Oklahoma Supreme Court found the Oklahoma Constitution's provisions guaranteeing due process and a right to life guaranteed a limited right to an abortion when there is reasonable certainty pregnancy threatens a pregnant individual's life.

The 2025 American Values Atlas reported that, in their most recent survey, 50% of Oklahomans said that abortion should be legal in all or most cases. The Atlas previously reported that level was 56% in 2023 and 46% in 2024.

== History ==
=== History of access to legal abortion ===
==== Prior to Roe ====
From the arrival of English colonists, abortion in what eventually became the United States was governed by English Common law, which stipulated that abortion after quickening was murder. Before to the end of the 19th century, abortion was often viewed as a private matter and did not become widely discussed until the public became concerned about unsafe abortions performed by (female) unlicensed practitioners.

Oklahoma passed a law in 1910 that made "anyone who caused a woman to miscarry her baby guilty of a felony."

==== Roe era ====
The US Supreme Court's decision in 1973's Roe v. Wade ruling meant the state could no longer regulate abortion in the first trimester.

The state passed a law in the 2000s banning abortions after 22 weeks because legislators alleged that a fetus could feel pain.

The state was one of 23 states in 2007 to have a detailed abortion-specific informed consent requirement. The law required that materials be created by the Oklahoma State Department of Health. The informed consent materials were required by statute to be given to women and used graphic and inflammatory language. The law also required the woman to be told how far advanced her pregnancy was. Oklahoma law required that women seeking abortions after 20 weeks be verbally informed that the fetus may feel pain during the abortion procedure, despite a Journal of the American Medical Association conclusion that pain sensors do not develop in the fetus until between weeks 23 and 30. Informed consent materials about fetal pain at 20 weeks stated "the unborn child has the physical structures necessary to experience pain." In contrast, The Journal of the American Medical Association has concluded that pain sensors do not develop in the fetus until 23–30 weeks. It should be stated that some research does agree with the principle of the law, including findings of the Journal of Medical Ethics, more recent evidence calls into question the necessity of the cortex for pain and demonstrating functional thalamic connectivity into the subplate is used to argue that the neuroscience cannot definitively rule out fetal pain before 24 weeks.

A 2009 Oklahoma law, overturned by a federal court in 2010, would have required doctors to report information from a 37-question form about every woman receiving an abortion to the state health department for publication in an online registry. A lawyer for the Center for Reproductive Rights, a co-plaintiff in the lawsuit challenging the law, said the law would have made public potentially identifying details about women, and was intended to dissuade women from seeking abortions. Todd Lamb, who sponsored the law as a state senator, called it "essential in protecting the sanctity of life" and "pro-life". A fetal heartbeat bill (SB 1274) was signed into law by then-Oklahoma Governor Mary Fallin in April 2012 that required an abortion provider to offer a woman the opportunity to hear the conceptus's heartbeat before ending the pregnancy and applied when the conceptus was at least eight weeks old. The bill took effect in November 2012.

In 2013, the Targeted Regulation of Abortion Providers (TRAP) law applied to medication-induced abortions in addition to abortion clinics. On November 4, 2013, the U.S. Supreme Court declined to hear an appeal by the state of Oklahoma to the overturning, on constitutional grounds, of a bill intended to ban the practice of terminations of early pregnancies via medication.

In 2016, Oklahoma state legislators passed a bill to criminalize abortion for providers, potentially charging them with up to three years in prison. On May 20, 2016, Governor Mary Fallin vetoed the bill before it could become law, citing its wording as too vague to withstand a legal challenge. The state legislature was one of four states nationwide that tried, and failed, to pass a "fetal heartbeat" bill in 2016.

In 2017, the state was one of six where the legislature introduced a bill that would have banned abortion in almost all cases. It did not pass. They were also one of eight states trying to pass a "fetal heartbeat" bill that year. The state legislature tried and failed to ban abortion again in 2018. They also tried and failed to pass a "fetal heartbeat" bill that year. In mid-May 2019, state law banned abortion after week 22.

In March 2020, Governor Kevin Stitt signed an executive order to limit elective medical procedures, later confirming that all types of abortion services were included, except for those necessary in a medical emergency or to "prevent serious health risks" to the pregnant individual. On April 6, federal judge Charles Barnes Goodwin blocked the executive order, ruling that the state "acted in an 'unreasonable,' 'arbitrary,' and 'oppressive' way," which "imposed an 'undue' burden on abortion access" in Oklahoma.

In 2021, Greg Treat and Jon Echols authored a trigger law, SB 918 to repeal sections of Oklahoma statutes relating to abortion, upon reversal of Roe v Wade. SB 918 re-activates the 1910 statute 21-861, criminalizing the procuring of an abortion except for medical necessity. It was signed into law on April 27, 2021. Nathan Dahm and Jim Olsen authored SB 612 to criminalize all abortions, with the only exception being for medical emergency. It was signed into law on April 12, 2022.

==== Dobbs era ====
Oklahoma's abortion ban took effect on May 25, 2022, when Governor Kevin Stitt signed HB 4327 into law, and abortion providers ceased offering services in Oklahoma as of that date. HB 4327 is modeled after the Texas Heartbeat Act and is enforced solely through civil lawsuits brought by private citizens, making it exceedingly difficult for abortion providers to challenge the constitutionality of the statute in court. Oklahoma was the first state to successfully ban abortion from the moment of fertilization post-Roe v. Wade. The Supreme Court overturned Roe v. Wade in Dobbs v. Jackson Women's Health Organization No. 19-1392, 597 U.S. ___ (2022) in June 2022.

In the year following the overturn of Roe v. Wade in 2022, 210 pregnant women in a dozen states were criminally charged for conduct associated with their pregnancy, pregnancy loss or birth. Six states – Alabama, Mississippi, Ohio, Oklahoma, South Carolina and Texas – accounted for most cases.

In March 2023, a 5–4 majority of the Oklahoma Supreme Court found that the Oklahoma Constitution guarantee of a right to life included a "limited right" to life-saving abortions when there is "reasonable" certainty pregnancy threatens a person's life and that the Oklahoma Legislature's requirement of an "imminent medical emergency" violated that right. The Court declined to comment on the constitutionality of bans on elective abortions. On May 31, 2023, the Oklahoma Supreme Court overturned Senate Bill 1503 and House Bill 4327 as unconstitutional limitations on the right to abortion in the state. SB 1503, authored by Senator Julie Daniels, had banned abortion from the detection of a fetal heartbeat (usually about 6 weeks into a pregnancy). It allowed for an exception for "medical emergencies," but did not define the term. HB 4237, authored by Representative Wendi Stearman, had been described as the "strictest abortion ban in the country" and prevented abortion from conception and had exceptions for saving the life of the pregnant individual and rapes that had been reported to police.

On September 12, 2023, a woman filed an administrative complaint with the U.S. Department of Health and Human Services against hospitals in Oklahoma, stating that two different Oklahoma hospitals denied her an abortion despite having dangerous pregnancy complications.

On August 16, 2025, an 11-year-old girl from Muskogee, Oklahoma gave birth after being raped by her stepfather. Oklahoma has a total abortion ban with no exceptions for rape or incest.

In September, 2026 The Center for Reproductive Rights filed a lawsuit asking to affirm the rights of pregnant Oklahomans' to access abortion after receiving fatal fetal diagnoses. The case was filed on behalf of Magon Hoffman and Sheena Hamlin who needed to leave Oklahoma to obtain care after learning their fetuses were not going to survive.

=== Clinic history ===
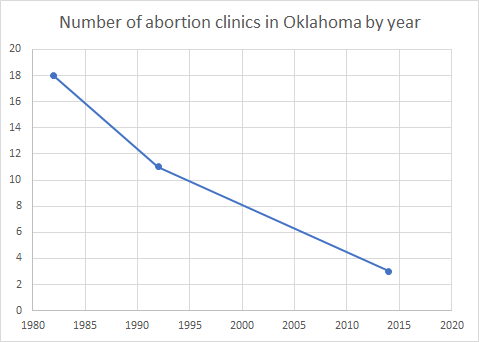
Number of abortion clinics in Oklahoma by year

Between 1982 and 1992, the number of abortion clinics in the state decreased by seven, going from eighteen in 1982 to eleven in 1992. In the period between 1992 and 1996, the state saw no change in the total number of abortion clinics. While only three states saw gains in this period, this state was one of four to see no changes with 11 abortion clinics in the state in 1996. In 2014, there were three abortion clinics in the state. In 2014, 96% of the counties in the state did not have an abortion clinic. That year, 54% of women in the state aged 15–44 lived in a county without an abortion clinic. In 2014, 51% of adults said in a poll by the Pew Research Center that abortion should be legal in all or most cases. In 2017, there were six Planned Parenthood clinics, of which one offered abortion services, in a state with a population of 882,108 women aged 15–49.

The first new clinic to provide abortion care opened in Oklahoma City in 2016, Trust Women Oklahoma City. As of 2022, there are no abortion providers offering services in Oklahoma as a result of HB 4327.

=== History of the abortion-rights movement ===
Women from the state participated in marches supporting abortion rights as part of a #StoptheBans movement in May 2019. Many Oklahoman's who were supportive of abortion started protesting following restrictions on the procedure that were signed into law in May 2022. In June 2022, additional protests across several cities such as Oklahoma City, Norman, and Tulsa had risen substantially after the Supreme Court's ruling on Dobbs v. Jackson Women's Health Organization.

Following the overturn of Roe v. Wade on June 24, 2022, hundreds of abortion rights protesters rallied and marched in Oklahoma City, Tulsa,Talequah, and Bartlesville.

== Statistics ==
In the period between 1972 and 1974, there was one illegal abortion death in Oklahoma. In the same period, the state had an illegal abortion mortality rate per million women aged 15–44 of between 0.1 and 0.9. In 1990, 328,000 women in the state faced the risk of an unintended pregnancy. In 2010, the state had no publicly funded abortions. In 2013, among white women aged 15–19, there were 460 abortions, 110 abortions for black women aged 15–19, 0 abortions for Hispanic women aged 15–19, and 140 abortions for women of all other races. In 2017, the state had an infant mortality rate of 7.7 deaths per 1,000 live births.

Number of reported abortions, abortion rate and percentage change in rate by geographic region and state in 1992, 1995 and 1996
Census division and state	Number			Rate			% change 1992–1996
Census division and state	1992	1995	1996	1992	1995	1996	% change 1992–1996
US Total	1,528,930	1,363,690	1,365,730	25.9	22.9	22.9	−12
West South Central	127,070	119,200	120,610	19.6	18	18.1	−8
Arkansas	7,130	6,010	6,200	13.5	11.1	11.4	−15
Louisiana	13,600	14,820	14,740	13.4	14.7	14.7	10
Oklahoma	8,940	9,130	8,400	12.5	12.9	11.8	−5
Texas	97,400	89,240	91,270	23.1	20.5	20.7	−10

Number, rate, and ratio of reported abortions, by reporting area of residence and occurrence and by percentage of abortions obtained by out-of-state residents, US CDC estimates
Location	Residence			Occurrence			% obtained by out-of-state residents	Year	Ref
Location	No.	Rate^	Ratio^^	No.	Rate^	Ratio^^	% obtained by out-of-state residents	Year	Ref
Oklahoma	4,808	6.3	90	4,916	6.4	92	8.7	2014	
Oklahoma	4,813	6.3	91	4,709	6.1	89	8	2015	
Oklahoma	4,409	5.7	84	4,294	5.6	82	8.0	2016	
^number of abortions per 1,000 women aged 15–44; ^^number of abortions per 1,000 live births
