= California Voter Bill of Rights =

State based legislature

The California Voter Bill of Rights is an adaptation of the United States Voting Rights Act passed in 1965.
