= 2022 Vermont Proposal 5 =

2022 ballot initiative

Proposal 5
- November 8, 2022
- Reproductive Liberty Amendment

Results
Choice	Votes	%
Yes	212,323	76.77%
No	64,239	23.23%
Total votes	276,562	100.00%

Yes
50–60%
60–70%
70–80%
80–90%
90–100%
No Vote

The 2022 Vermont reproductive rights initiative, officially titled the "Reproductive Liberty Amendment", and listed on the ballot as Proposition 5, was a legislatively referred constitutional amendment that was adopted on November 8, 2022, by a landslide majority of 76.8% of voters. It codified reproductive rights in the Constitution of Vermont. It was signed into the constitution by Republican governor Phil Scott on 13 December 2022.

== Background ==
In the 19th century, bans by state legislatures on abortion were about protecting the life of the mother, given the number of deaths caused by abortions; state governments saw themselves as looking out for the lives of their citizens. Vermont's first ban on abortion was passed in 1846. It read:

“Whoever maliciously, or without lawful justification, with intent to cause and procure the miscarriage of a woman, then pregnant with child, shall administer to her, prescribe for her, or advise, or direct her to take or swallow any poison, drug, medicine, or noxious thing, or shall cause or procure her, with like intent, to take or swallow any poison, drug, medicine, or noxious thing, and whoever maliciously, and without lawful justification, shall use any instrument or means whatever, with the like intent, and every person, with the like intent, knowingly aiding and assisting such offenders, shall be deemed guilty of felony, if the woman die in consequence thereof, and shall be imprisoned in the state prison, not more than ten years, nor less than five years; and if the woman does not die in consequence thereof, such offenders shall be deemed guilty of a misdemeanor; and shall be punished by imprisonment in the state prison not exceeding three years, nor less than one year, and pay a fine not exceeding two hundred dollars.”

In 1970, the Vermont Supreme Court upheld the constitutionality of the state's abortion ban in the context of the Constitution of the United States in State v. Bartlett. However, the court overturned the ban less than two years later, in Beacham v. Leahy, based on the Vermont Constitution.

== Text ==
Personal reproductive liberty
That an individual's right to personal reproductive autonomy is central to the liberty and dignity to determine one's own life course, and shall not be denied or infringed, unless justified by a compelling state interest achieved by the least restrictive means.

== Endorsements ==
Yes

U.S. Representatives

- Peter Welch, VT-AL (2007–2023) (Democrat)

State legislators

- Jessica Brumsted, HD–Chittenden 7 (2017–present) (Democrat)

Individuals

- Sue Racanelli, president of the League of Women Voters of Vermont

Organizations

- League of Women Voters of Vermont
- Planned Parenthood Vermont Action Fund
No

State Representatives

- Anne Donahue, state representative from the Washington-2 district (2003–present) (Republican)

Organizations

- Diocese of Burlington

== Results ==
2022 Vermont Proposal 5
Choice	Votes	%
For	212,323	76.77
Against	64,239	23.23
Total	276,562	100.00

== See also ==
- Abortion in Vermont
- 2022 Kansas abortion referendum
- 2022 California Proposition 1
- 2022 Michigan Proposal 3
- November 2023 Ohio Issue 1
- 2024 Arizona Proposition 139
- 2024 Colorado Amendment 79
- 2024 Florida Amendment 4
- 2024 Maryland Question 1
- 2024 Missouri Amendment 3
- 2024 Montana Initiative 128
- 2024 Nebraska Right to Abortion Initiative
- 2024 Nevada Question 6
- 2024 New York Proposal 1
- 2024 South Dakota Amendment G
- 2022 Vermont Proposal 2
- 2026 Idaho Proposition 1
- 2026 Missouri Amendment 3
- 2026 Nevada Question 6
- 2026 Virginia Question 1
