= Abortion in New Mexico =

Abortion in New Mexico is legal at all stages of pregnancy. The number of abortion clinics in New Mexico has declined over the years, with 26 in 1982, 20 in 1992 and 11 in 2014. There were 4,500 legal abortions in 2014. There were 7 facilities providing abortion in New Mexico in 2017, and 6 of those were clinics. In 2017, 91% of New Mexico counties had no clinics that provided abortions, and 48% of New Mexico women lived in those counties. New Mexico and Arizona are the southernmost continental states where abortion remains broadly legal.

New Mexico has almost no abortion restrictions in comparison to other states. There are no waiting periods, no required parental consent, and no inability to use state funding for an abortion. Individuals aged 13 and older who are seeking an abortion may get one without parental permission.

In New Mexico politics, the Democratic Party of New Mexico supports access to abortion while the Republican Party of New Mexico opposes abortion, including calling for restricting or banning the procedure. In the cities of Hobbs, Clovis, and Eunice, local ordinances were passed in 2022 and 2023 to prevent abortion clinics from operating. These ordinances were all overwritten by a 2023 state law prohibiting local abortion bans.

== History ==
=== Legislative history ===
In the late 1960s and early 1970s, Arkansas, Colorado, Georgia, Maryland, New Mexico, North Carolina and Oregon made reforms to their abortion laws, with most of these states providing more detailed medical guidance on when therapeutic abortions could be performed. In 1969, the New Mexico legislature passed a law that made it a felony for anyone to provide a woman with an abortion unless it was needed to save her life, or because her pregnancy was a result of rape or incest. The U.S. Supreme Court's decision in 1973's Roe v. Wade barred states from regulating abortion in the first trimester; consequently, New Mexico's 1969 abortion law became unenforceable. (However, the Supreme Court overturned Roe v. Wade in Dobbs v. Jackson Women's Health Organization, No. 19-1392, 597 U.S. ___ (2022) later in 2022.) In March 2019, the legislature considered a bill that would have repealed the 1969 law. While the New Mexico House of Representatives passed the repeal bill, it was defeated in the State Senate by a vote of 24–18. In February 2021, the repeal bill passed the Senate; it was signed into law in March 2021. The bill faced opposition from state Republicans. Senate Bill 13 was signed into law in April 2023, which codified protections for abortion and persecution from out-of-state into state law.

In 2017, New Mexico, Washington, Illinois, Alaska, Maryland, Massachusetts, Connecticut, and New Jersey allowed qualified non-physicians to prescribe drugs for medical abortions only.

=== Judicial history ===
In 1999, the New Mexico Supreme Court ruled that the state ERA requires that Medicaid coverage for women must be available on the same basis as coverage for men, and struck down restrictions on Medicaid abortion coverage.

In 2025, the New Mexico Supreme Court struck down several local ordinances in the state that attempted to restrict the distribution of mifepristone, unanimously ruling that the ordinances invaded the state legislature’s authority to regulate reproductive care.

=== Clinic history ===
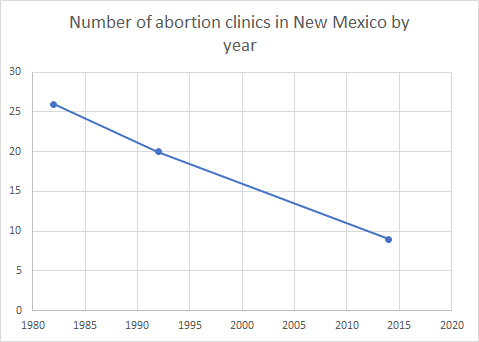
Number of abortion clinics in New Mexico by year

Between 1982 and 1992, the number of abortion clinics in the state decreased by six, going from 26 in 1982 to twenty in 1992. In 2014, there were eleven facilities which provided abortions of which nine were abortion clinics. In 2014, 91% of the counties in the state did not have an abortion clinic. That year, 48% of women in the state aged 15–44 lived in a county without an abortion clinic. In March 2016, there were six Planned Parenthood clinics in the state. In 2017, Planned Parenthood closed three clinics in the state. This was done around their plans to try to consolidate reproductive services they offered. Later that year, there were three total Planned Parenthood clinics in the state of which two offered abortion services. At the time, the population was 456,213 for women aged 15–49.

== Statistics ==
In the period between 1972 and 1974, there were zero recorded illegal abortion deaths in the state. In 1990, 181,000 women in the state faced the risk of an unintended pregnancy. Between 2011 and 2014, there was a 10% decline in the number of abortions performed in the state. In 2013, there were 150 abortions among white women aged 15–19, 20 abortions for black women aged 15–19, 370 abortions for Hispanic women aged 15–19, and 70 abortions for women of all other races. In 2014, 51% of adults said in a poll by the Pew Research Center that abortion should be legal in all or most cases. The 2023 American Values Atlas reported that, in their most recent survey, 67% of New Mexicans said that abortion should be legal in all or most cases. In 2017, the state had an infant mortality rate of 5.9 deaths per 1,000 live births.

After Roe v. Wade was overturned on June 24, 2022, the number of abortions in New Mexico more than tripled, primarily due to patients traveling from states with abortion bans.

Number of reported abortions, abortion rate and percentage change in rate by geographic region and state in 1992, 1995 and 1996
Census division and state	Number			Rate			% change 1992–1996
Census division and state	1992	1995	1996	1992	1995	1996	% change 1992–1996
US Total	1,528,930	1,363,690	1,365,730	25.9	22.9	22.9	–12
Mountain	69,600	63,390	67,020	21	17.9	18.6	–12
Arizona	20,600	18,120	19,310	24.1	19.1	19.8	–18
Colorado	19,880	15,690	18,310	23.6	18	20.9	–12
Idaho	1,710	1,500	1,600	7.2	5.8	6.1	–15
Montana	3,300	3,010	2,900	18.2	16.2	15.6	–14
Nevada	13,300	15,600	15,450	44.2	46.7	44.6	1
New Mexico	6,410	5,450	5,470	17.7	14.4	14.4	–19
Utah	3,940	3,740	3,700	9.3	8.1	7.8	–16
Wyoming	460	280	280	4.3	2.7	2.7	–37

Number, rate, and ratio of reported abortions, by reporting area of residence and occurrence and by percentage of abortions obtained by out-of-state residents, US CDC estimates
Location	Residence			Occurrence			% obtained by out-of-state residents	Year	Ref
Location	No.	Rate^	Ratio^^	No.	Rate^	Ratio^^	% obtained by out-of-state residents	Year	Ref
New Mexico	3,655	9.2	140	4,500	11.3	173	21	2014	
New Mexico	3,502	8.9	142	4,573	11.6	185	27.0	2016	
^number of abortions per 1,000 women aged 15–44; ^^number of abortions per 1,000 live births

== Abortion financing ==
Seventeen states including New Mexico used their own funds to cover all or most "medically necessary" abortions sought by low-income women under Medicaid, thirteen of which are required by state court orders to do so. In 2010, the state had 1,270 publicly funded abortions, of which none were federally funded and 1,270 were state funded. Public funding was still available in May 2018.

== Abortion rights views and activities ==
Women from the state participated in marches supporting abortion rights as part of a #StopTheBans movement in May 2019.

Following the overturn of Roe v. Wade on June 24, 2022, hundreds of abortion rights protesters rallied in Albuquerque.

== Anti-abortion views and activities ==
=== Violence ===
On December 6, 2007, Chad Altman and Sergio Baca were arrested for the arson of Dr. Curtis Boyd's clinic in Albuquerque. Baca's girlfriend had scheduled an appointment for an abortion at the clinic.
