= Dima Qato =

Pharmacoepidemiologist and pharmacist

Dima M. Qato
- Education: University of Illinois Chicago; Johns Hopkins Bloomberg School of Public Health; University of Illinois School of Public Health
- Known for: Research on pharmacy deserts, medication access, and pharmacy equity
- Awards: National Academy of Medicine Pharmacy Fellowship (2018–2020); Fulbright Scholarship
- Scientific career
- Fields: Pharmacy; Pharmacoepidemiology; Public health
- Workplaces: University of Southern California

Dima Mazen Qato is the Hygeia Centennial Chair and a tenured associate professor in the Titus Family Department of Clinical Pharmacy at the USC Alfred E. Mann School of Pharmacy and Pharmaceutical Sciences. She directs the USC Mann Program on Medicines and Public Health and is a senior fellow of the USC Leonard D. Schaeffer Center for Health Policy and Economics and holds an appointment with the USC Spatial Sciences Institute.

She coined the term "pharmacy desert" in a 2014 Health Affairs article that found there were far fewer pharmacies in Chicago's Black neighborhoods than in white and mixed neighborhoods.

Her research focuses on the way pharmacy access, or lack of it, affects people's ability to get the medications they need to adhere to the drug regimens prescribed by their doctors.

== Education ==
She earned a Doctor of Pharmacy degree (PharmD) from the University of Illinois Chicago, a master of public health from the Johns Hopkins Bloomberg School of Public Health, and a PhD in public health from the University of Illinois School of Public Health.

== Career ==
Before coming to the University of Southern California in 2020, Qato served as an associate professor at the University of Illinois Chicago. She was the National Academy of Medicine Fellow in Pharmacy in 2018-2020.

=== Research ===
She is known for research on pharmacy deserts, communities with limited geographic access to pharmacies, which has influenced discussions of pharmacy access as a component of health equity and public health infrastructure. Her research has examined disparities in pharmacy availability, prescription drug access, medication affordability, and the effects of pharmacy closures on patient care. At USC, she led the development of a national pharmacy deserts mapping tool.

She has also published research on medication use among older adults, contraceptive access through pharmacies, insulin affordability, pharmacy benefit managers, and prescription drug policy. Her work has appeared in academic journals including JAMA, JAMA Health Forum, JAMA Internal Medicine and Health Affairs. She has been quoted widely in the media in outlets including the New York Times, Associated Press, Axios, the Washington Post, Chicago Tribune, CNN, the BBC, PBS Newshour, National Geographic, California Healthline and NPR.

=== Academic ===
Qato directs the USC Mann School's masters and graduate certificate programs in pharmacoepidemiology and drug safety.

== Selected publications ==
- "More U.S. Pharmacies Closed Than Opened In 2018–21; Independent Pharmacies, Those In Black, Latinx Communities Most At Risk" (Health Affairs, 2024)
- Pharmacist-Prescribed and Over-the-Counter Hormonal Contraception in Los Angeles (Health Affairs, 2020)
- Ensuring Access to Medications in the U.S. during the COVID-19 Pandemic (JAMA, 2020)
- "Changes in Prescription and Over-the-Counter Medication and Dietary Supplement Use Among Older Adults in the United States, 2005 vs 2011" (JAMA Internal Medicine, 2016)
- "Pharmacy Deserts are Prevalent in Chicago's Predominantly Minority Communities, Raising Medication Access Concerns" (Health Affairs, 2014)
- "Use of Prescription and Over-the-Counter Medications and Dietary Supplements Among Older Adults in the United States" (JAMA, 2008)

== Honors and recognition ==
Among Qato's honors are the National Academy of Medicine Pharmacy Fellowship (2018-2020) and a Fulbright Scholarship to Jordan.
