= 2022 California Proposition 26 =

Proposition 26
- November 8, 2022
- Allows In-Person Roulette, Dice Game, Sports Wagering on Tribal Lands. Initiative Constitutional Amendment and Statute.

Results
Choice	Votes	%
Yes	3,514,597	33.02%
No	7,129,127	66.98%
Valid votes	10,643,724	95.49%
Invalid or blank votes	502,896	4.51%
Total votes	11,146,620	100.00%
Registered voters/turnout	21,940,274	50.8%

No
70–80%
60–70%
50–60%
- Source: Statement of Vote at the Wayback Machine (archived September 23, 2023)

Proposition 26, known as the Legalize Sports Betting on American Indian Lands Initiative was a California ballot proposition that was rejected by voters in the general election on November 8, 2022. The proposition would have legalized in-person sports gambling at tribal casinos and horse racetracks in California, as well as additional gambling games such as craps and roulette at tribal casinos, and would have created a 10% tax on profits derived from sports betting at racetracks. Voters rejected the proposal overwhelmingly with more than two-thirds of the vote, and the proposition being defeated in every county.

A Native American tribe's authority to offer such games would need to be negotiated with the state.

== Results ==
Proposition 26 results (excluding invalid votes)
Yes; 3,514,597 (33%)	No; 7,129,127 (67%)
▲50%
