= 2022 Kentucky Amendment 2 =

No Right to Abortion in Constitution Amendment
- November 8, 2022
- Are you in favor of amending the Constitution of Kentucky by creating a new Section of the Constitution to be numbered Section 26A to state as follows: To protect human life, nothing in this Constitution shall be construed to secure or protect a right to abortion or require the funding of abortion?

Results
Choice	Votes	%
Yes	675,634	47.65%
No	742,232	52.35%
Total votes	1,417,866	100.00%

Yes
80–90%
70–80%
60–70%
50–60%
No
80–90%
70–80%
60–70%
50–60%

Kentucky Amendment 2 was a rejected legislatively referred constitutional amendment to the Kentucky Constitution, which was voted on as part of the 2022 elections. If enacted, the amendment would have declared that nothing in the Kentucky Constitution could be construed to protect a right to an abortion or public funding of an abortion.

Kentucky was one of six states to vote on an abortion-related referendum as part of the 2022 elections, alongside California, Michigan, Montana, Kansas, and Vermont. This was in the immediate aftermath of the United States Supreme Court's decision in Dobbs v. Jackson Women's Health Organization, which held that the United States Constitution did not confer a right to an abortion, allowing individual states to permit, regulate, or prohibit abortion. In 2022, Kentucky was the only one of these states with both an active abortion ban and an active abortion referendum. Following the results of the referendum, Kentucky's abortion ban was contested by abortion providers to the Kentucky Supreme Court, which in February 2023 ruled that the providers lacked standing to challenge the state's abortion ban. As of 2024, abortions remain illegal in Kentucky.

== Background ==
Following the U.S. Supreme Court's decision in Dobbs, a trigger law went into effect banning any abortions in Kentucky unless necessary to prevent death or physical impairment of a pregnant woman. This ban was temporarily blocked by a court on June 30, 2022, then re-instated by a higher court on August 1, 2022.

The amendment was introduced in the Kentucky Legislature in March 2021 as HB 91. It was supported by Kentucky Right to Life and opposed by the ACLU of Kentucky. Supporters of the amendment organized as the group Yes for Life, while opponents of the amendment organized as the group Protect Kentucky Access.

== Legislative history ==
Amendments to the Kentucky Constitution require 3/5 support in both houses of the General Assembly and a majority vote by referendum; they can not be vetoed by the governor. The amendment was first introduced on January 5 in the 2021 General Assembly as House Bill 91 by representative Joseph Fischer. The bill subsequently passed both houses.

=== House vote ===
Map of the vote Republican yea (74) Republican not voting (1) Democratic yea (2) Democratic nay (20) Democratic not voting (3)

The bill was initially passed by the house on February 25 by a 76–20 vote. Representatives Tom Burch and Reginald Meeks, who did not vote, later modified their votes to nay.

House of Representatives vote
Party	Votes for	Votes against	Not voting
Democratic (25)	2: Angie Hatton; Ashley Tackett Laferty	20	3
Republican (75)	74	–	1
Total (100)	76	20	4

=== Senate vote ===
Map of the vote Republican yea (30) Democratic yea (2) Democratic nay (6)

The bill was approved by the senate on March 30 by a 32–6 vote.

Senate vote
Party	Votes for	Votes against
Democratic (8)	2: Dennis Parrett; Robin L. Webb	6
Republican (30)	30	–
Total (38)	32	6

== Arguments ==
Supporters of the "Yes" campaign claimed that the amendment was a safeguard against judicial activism and a potential state-level Roe v. Wade decision by the Kentucky Supreme Court. They argued that late-term abortion and public funding for abortion would become common in Kentucky were the amendment to fail.

Supporters of the "No" campaign claimed that abortion would become permanently banned in Kentucky were the amendment to succeed, and that exceptions for rape and incest could never become law under the proposed amendment.

== Results ==
No Right to Abortion in Constitution Amendment
Choice	Votes	%
For	675,634	47.65
Against	742,232	52.35
Total	1,417,866	100.00
Source: Secretary of State of Kentucky

=== By congressional district ===
"No" won three of six congressional districts, including two that elected Republicans.

District	No	Yes	Representative
1	42.7%	57.3%	▌James Comer (R)
2	47.4%	52.6%	▌Brett Guthrie (R)
3	72.3%	27.7%	▌John Yarmuth (D - 117th Congress)
3	72.3%	27.7%	▌Morgan McGarvey (D - 118th Congress)
4	51.5%	48.5%	▌Thomas Massie (R)
5	36.3%	63.7%	▌Hal Rogers (R)
6	60.4%	39.6%	▌Andy Barr (R)

== Aftermath ==
The uniform results in Kentucky, Montana, California, Vermont, and Michigan abortion referendums were seen as a victory for the pro-choice movement, and were praised by pro-choice organizations and activists. Anti-abortion organizations such as Susan B. Anthony Pro-Life America attributed their losses to misinformation and large amounts of outside spending from the pro-choice side.

State attorney general Daniel Cameron stated that the failure of the amendment should have no impact on whether the Kentucky Constitution contains the right to an abortion.

On February 16, 2023, the Kentucky Supreme Court ruled that abortion providers lacked standing to challenge the state's abortion ban, but did not elaborate on whether or not the Kentucky Constitution secured abortion rights.

== See also ==
- Abortion in the United States
- 2022 Kansas Value Them Both Amendment
- 2022 Montana Legislative Referendum 131
