= USC Mann School of Pharmacy and Pharmaceutical Sciences =

Coordinates: 34.060312°N 118.205989°W

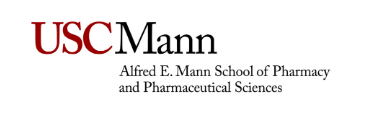
- Wordmark of the USC Mann School
- Other names: USC Alfred E. Mann School of Pharmacy and Pharmaceutical Sciences
- Former names: USC School of Pharmacy; USC College of Pharmacy
- Type: Private
- Established: 1905
- Parent institution: University of Southern California
- Accreditation: Accreditation Council for Pharmacy Education
- Dean: Vassilios Papadopoulos
- Faculty: 103
- Students: 675 Doctor of Pharmacy; 34 Doctor of Regulatory Science; 72 Doctor of Philosophy; 331 Master of Science
- Undergraduates: 583
- Location: 1985 Zonal Ave, Los Angeles, CA 90033, Los Angeles, California, United States
- Campus: Urban
- Website: mann.usc.edu

The USC Mann School of Pharmacy and Pharmaceutical Sciences (formally the USC School of Pharmacy) is the pharmacy school of the University of Southern California. The school was originally established in 1905 as USC College of Pharmacy.

== History ==
In 1905, the USC College of Pharmacy opened, the first in Southern California. In 1918, it created the four-year Bachelor of Science in pharmacy degree program. In 1950, it established the nation's first Doctor of Pharmacy (PharmD) program. The School launched the nation's first PharmD/MBA dual degree in 1990, the first PhD in pharmaceutical economics and policy in 1994, the first professional doctorate in regulatory science in 2008, and a translational science graduate program that merges science with clinical expertise. The USC College of Pharmacy established the nation's first Doctor of Pharmacy (PharmD) program in 1950. Later, in 1968, the school introduced the nation's first clinical pharmacy program, and the first Master of Science in radiopharmacy. In 1974, the school relocated to the USC Health Sciences campus, where students and faculty had access to multidisciplinary medical facilities and the Los Angeles General Medical Center. In 1988, USC established the nation's first PharmD/MBA dual degree program, training students in both pharmacy and business administration.

On November 17, 2022, the University of Southern California released an announcement, stating that the USC School of Pharmacy will be renamed the "USC Alfred E. Mann School of Pharmacy and Pharmaceutical Sciences" and will receive a $50 million endowment for student scholarships, faculty recruitment and integrating a university-wide research infrastructure related to biomedical innovation across USC’s University Park and Health Sciences campuses.

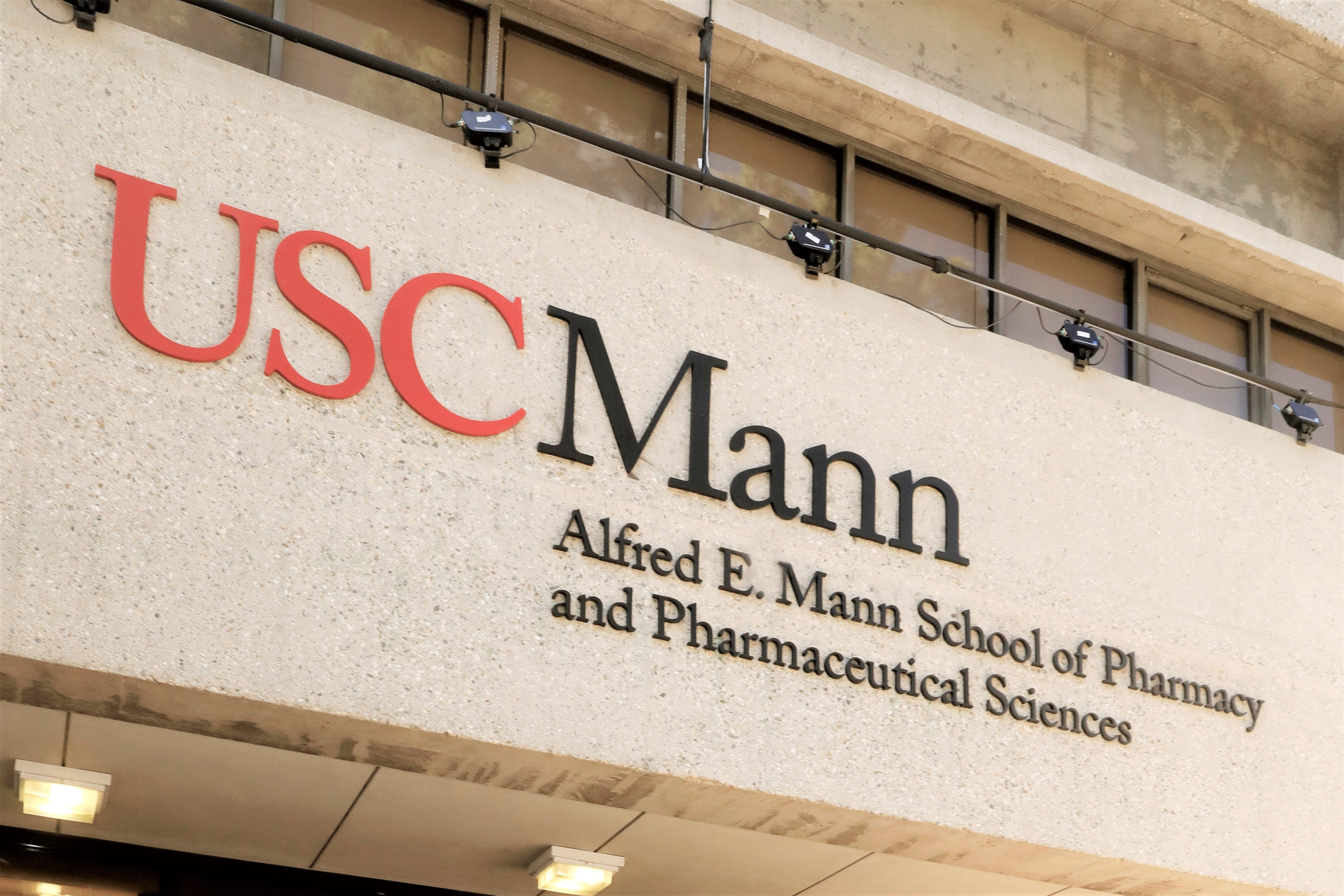
USC Alfred E. Mann School of Pharmacy and Pharmaceutical Sciences

== Academic departments ==
- Titus Family Department of Clinical Pharmacy
- Department of Pharmacology and Pharmaceutical Sciences
- Department of Pharmaceutical and Health Economics, based at the Leonard D. Schaeffer Center for Health Policy & Economics
- Department of Regulatory and Quality Sciences

== Patient Care Settings ==
Patient care settings include Keck Hospital of USC, Norris Comprehensive Cancer Center, Los Angeles General Medical Center, Huntington Hospital, Edward R. Roybal Comprehensive Health Center, and safety-net clinics including JWCH Institute, QueensCare, AltaMed Health Services.

The university owns and operates four pharmacies: USC Pharmacy (University Park Campus), USC Medical Plaza Pharmacy (Health Sciences Campus), USC Pharmacy and Wellness Center and Keck Medicine of USC Specialty Pharmacy.

The USC Pharmacy and Wellness Center, located at the intersection of Crenshaw and Slauson in South Los Angeles, opened in spring 2026.

== Rankings and reputation ==
In 2024, USC School of Pharmacy was ranked 12th out of 141 pharmacy schools in the nation by U.S. News & World Report.
