= Abortion in Vermont =

Abortion in Vermont is legal at all stages of pregnancy to birth. A 2014 Pew Research Center poll showed 70% of adults in the state believed abortion should be legal in most or all cases, the second highest percentage in the country. The 2023 American Values Atlas reported that, in their most recent survey, 76% of Vermonters said that abortion should be legal in all or most cases. The state funds abortions deemed medically necessary for low-income women via Medicaid.

In November 2022, voters overwhelmingly passed Proposal 5, the Reproductive Liberty Amendment, making Vermont the first U.S. state to amend their constitution to explicitly include protections for abortion rights. Governor Phil Scott signed it into law the following month.

== History ==
=== Legislative history ===
By the end of the 1800s, all states in the Union except Louisiana had medical exceptions in their legislative bans on abortions. In the 19th century, bans on abortion by state legislatures were largely about protecting the life of the mother given the number of deaths caused by abortions; state governments saw themselves as looking out for the lives of their citizens.

As of 2013, California, Oregon, Montana, Vermont, and New Hampshire allow qualified non-physician health professionals, such as physicians' assistants, nurse practitioners, and certified nurse midwives, to do first-trimester aspiration abortions and to prescribe drugs for medical abortions.

In February 2019, Vermont House Human Services and Judiciary committees held public hearings about abortion in relation to H.57, a bill to establish reproductive rights in state law. Proposal 5, the Reproductive Liberty Amendment, an amendment to the state constitution to codify abortion rights, was passed by the state senate. Receiving endorsements from Republican Governor Phil Scott, Planned Parenthood, and ACLU Vermont, the amendment went before voters in November 2022 and overwhelmingly passed, with about 77% voting in favor.

==== Amendment text ====
Personal reproductive liberty
That an individual’s right to personal reproductive autonomy is central to the liberty and dignity to determine one’s own life course and shall not be denied or infringed unless justified by a compelling State interest achieved by the least restrictive means.

— Chapter 1, Article 22 of the Vermont Constitution.

=== Judicial history ===
In 1972, the Vermont Supreme Court issued a ruling that effectively ended abortion restrictions in the state. The US Supreme Court's decision in 1973's Roe v. Wade meant the state could no longer regulate abortion in the first trimester. The Supreme Court overturned Roe v. Wade in Dobbs v. Jackson Women's Health Organization in 2022, returning the matter to the states.

=== Clinic history ===
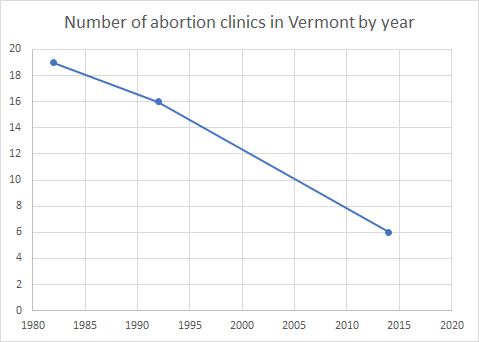
Number of abortion clinics in Vermont by year

Between 1982 and 1992, the number of abortion clinics in the state declined by three, going from nineteen in 1982 to sixteen in 1992. In 2014, there were six abortion clinics in the state. 64% of the counties in the state did not have an abortion clinic. That year, 38% of women in the state aged 15–44 lived in a county without an abortion clinic. In 2017, there were twelve Planned Parenthood clinics, of which six offered abortion services, in a state with a population of 136,459 women aged 15–49.

Abortions beyond 22 weeks of pregnancy in Vermont are only available at the University of Vermont Medical Center for limited medical reasons.

== Statistics ==
In the period between 1972 and 1974, there were zero recorded illegal abortion deaths in the state. In 1990, 67,000 women in the state faced the risk of an unintended pregnancy. In 2013, among white women aged 15–19, there were 190 abortions, 0 abortions for black women aged 15–19, 10 abortions for Hispanic women aged 15–19, and 10 abortions for women of all other races. In 2014, 70% of adults said in a poll by the Pew Research Center that abortion should be legal in all or most cases. In 2017, the state had an infant mortality rate of 5.9 deaths per 1,000 live births.

Number of reported abortions, abortion rate and percentage change in rate by geographic region and state in 1992, 1995 and 1996
Census division and state	Number			Rate			% change 1992–1996
Year	1992	1995	1996	1992	1995	1996	
Total	1,528,930	1,363,690	1,365,730	25.9	22.9	22.9	–12
New England	78,360	71,940	71,280	25.2	23.6	23.5	–7
Connecticut	19,720	16,680	16,230	26.2	23	22.5	–14
Maine	4,200	2,690	2,700	14.7	9.6	9.7	–34
Massachusetts	40,660	41,190	41,160	28.4	29.2	29.3	3
New Hampshire	3,890	3,240	3,470	14.6	12	12.7	–13
Rhode Island	6,990	5,720	5,420	30	25.5	24.4	–19

Number, rate, and ratio of reported abortions for Vermont, by reporting area of residence and occurrence, with percentage of abortions obtained by out-of-state residents, US CDC estimates
By Reported Residence			Occurrence			% obtained by out-of-state residents	Year	Ref
Number	Rate^	Ratio^^	Number	Rate^	Ratio^^	% obtained by out-of-state residents	Year	Ref
1,161	10.0	189	1,235	10.6	201	6.8	2014	
1,121	9.7	190	1,265	10.9	214	12.4	2015	
1,131	9.9	196	1,298	11.3	226	14.1	2016	
^number of abortions per 1,000 women aged 15–44; ^^number of abortions per 1,000 live births

== Abortion financing ==
17 states including Vermont use their own funds to cover all or most medically necessary abortions sought by low-income women under Medicaid, 13 of which are required by State court orders to do so. In 2010, the state had 699 publicly funded abortions, of which all were state funded and none were federally funded.

== Abortion rights views and activities ==
=== Protests ===
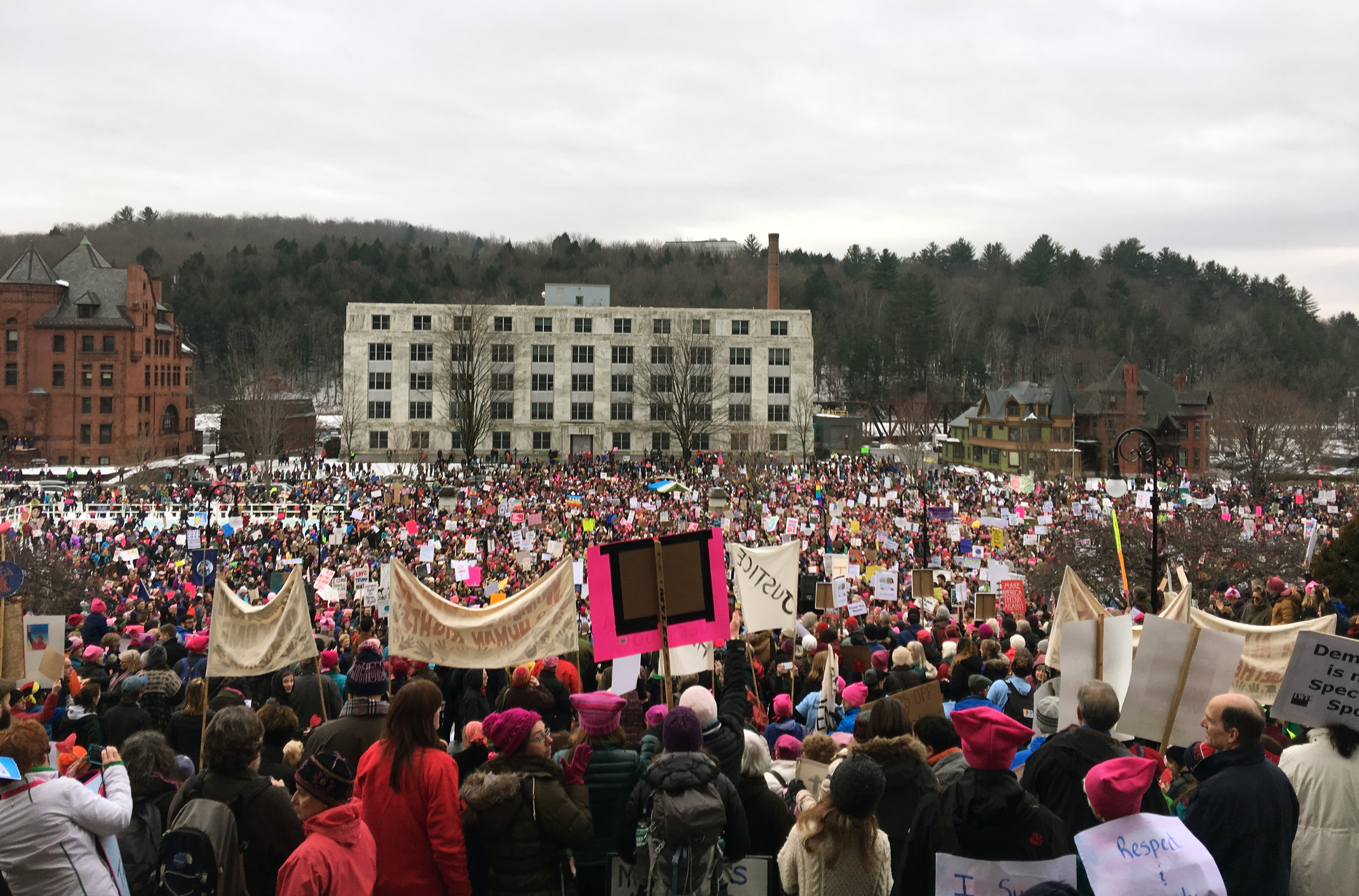
Montpelier, Vermont - Women's March.

Throughout the 2000s, women from the state participated in marches supporting abortion rights. One march was a part of a #StoptheBans movement in May 2019.

Following the overturn of Roe v. Wade on June 24, 2022, abortion rights protests were held in multiple cities in Vermont, including Bennington, Brattleboro, Burlington, Montpelier and Rutland, Vermont. Several Vermont politicians, including governor Phil Scott, lt. governor Molly Gray, Vermont House Speaker Jill Krowinski, United States senators Bernie Sanders and Patrick Leahy, U.S. representative Peter Welch, and then-Burlington mayor Miro Weinberger, were disappointed over the Court's decision to overturn Roe v. Wade.

== Anti-abortion views and activities ==
=== Violence ===
In May 1977, a clinic in Burlington, Vermont was destroyed by a fire, resulting in its closure for seven months.
