= 2026 California Proposition 39 =

Proposition 39
- November 3, 2026
- Voter Identification, Citizenship Verification, and Registered Voter List Administration Initiative
- Reporting: 98% as of November 18, 2026 at 8:38 AM PST

Results
| Choice | Votes | % |
|---|---|---|
| Yes | 5,133,860 | 39.48% |
| No | 7,869,263 | 60.52% |
County results
Yes
70–80%
60–70%
50–60%
No
80–90%
70–80%
60–70%
50–60%

Proposition 39, the California voter ID initiative, is an initiated constitutional amendment that appeared on the November 3, 2026, ballot in the US state of California. The initiative, which was rejected by voters, would have amended the state constitution to require the use of a government-issued ID for in-person voting, as well as the last four digits of a unique government-issued ID number when casting a mail-in ballot.

The amendment would have also required the state of California to provide free voter ID cards that can be used to cast a ballot, and would have enforced the maintenance of accurate voter registration lists by the secretary of state and election officials.

== Background ==
Currently, the state constitution limits voting to U.S. citizens, though proof of citizenship is not required unless a voter has become a U.S. citizen less than 15 days before an election. During the voter registration process, individuals must provide a form of ID and attest that they are a U.S. citizen under penalty of perjury. California is one of only 14 U.S. states that does not require identification while voting on election day.

On April 24, 2026, state officials announced that the initiative had qualified for the November ballot after supporters submitted over 1.3 million signatures.

Three other states – Nevada, North Carolina, and Oklahoma – also saw voter ID measures on their November 2026 ballots; the other measures were passed by voters.

=== Impact ===
The initiative would have amended the state constitution to enforce the use of government-issued ID while voting in-person, and the use of the last four digits of a government-issued ID number when voting by mail. Additionally, it would have mandated the maintenance of accurate voter registration lists by the secretary of state and county election officials, and required the state of California to provide free ID cards upon request to voters casting a ballot.

The voter ID initiative would have also authorized the California legislature to enact laws that would force compliance with the amendment, and permitted citizens to seek judicial review if they feel the state of California or any county within it is failing to comply with the amendment. Additionally, the state auditor would have been required to publicly audit state and county compliance every second year.

== Endorsements ==
Yes

Executive branch officials

- Bill Essayli, first assistant U.S. attorney for the Central District of California (2025–present) (Republican)

U.S. representatives

- Ken Calvert, CA-41 (1993–present) (Republican)

Statewide officials

- Ken Cuccinelli, former attorney general of Virginia (2010–2014) (Republican)
- Bill Jones, former secretary of state of California (1995–2003) (Republican)

State legislators

- Juan Alanis, AD-22 (2022–present) (Republican)
- Leticia Castillo, AD-58 (2024–present) (Republican)
- Steven Choi, SD-37 (2024–present) (Republican)
- Carl DeMaio, AD-75 (2024–present) (Republican)
- Jeff Gonzalez, AD-36 (2024–present) (Republican)
- Alexandra Macedo, AD-33 (2024–present) (Republican)
- Tony Strickland, SD-19 (2008–2012) and SD-36 (2025–present) (Republican)
- David Tangipa, AD-08 (2024–present) (Republican)
- Suzette Martinez Valladares, SD-23 (2024–present) (Republican)

Local officials

- Donald P. Wagner, Orange County supervisor from the 3rd district (2019–present) (Republican)

Individuals

- Steve Hilton, former director of strategy to the prime minister of the United Kingdom (2010–2012) (Republican)
- Jenny Beth Martin, conservative activist
- Corrin Rankin, chair of the California Republican Party
- Richard Uihlein, CEO of Uline

Organizations

- Americans for Tax Reform
- California College Republicans
- California Policy Center
- California ProLife Council
- California Republican Assembly
- Howard Jarvis Taxpayers Association
- Reform California

Political parties

- California Republican Party

Newspapers and media

- California Post
- The Desert Review
- KHTS Radio
- Palo Alto Daily Post
- Pirate Wires
- 11 Southern California News Group-owned newspapers:
  - Daily Breeze
  - Inland Valley Daily Bulletin
  - Los Angeles Daily News
  - Orange County Register
  - Pasadena Star-News
  - Press-Telegram
  - Redlands Daily Facts
  - San Gabriel Valley Tribune
  - The Press-Enterprise
  - The San Bernardino Sun
  - Whittier Daily News
No

Executive branch officials

- Xavier Becerra, former U.S. secretary of health and human services (2021–2025) (Democratic)

U.S. Senators

- Alex Padilla, California (2021–present) (Democratic)
- Adam Schiff, California (2024–present) (Democratic)

U.S. representatives

- Nancy Pelosi, former Speaker of the House (2007–2011; 2019–2023) from CA-11 (1987–present) (Democratic)
- Lateefah Simon, CA-12 (2025–present) (Democratic)
- 22 other U.S. representatives

Statewide officials

- Malia Cohen, controller of California (2023–present) (Democratic)
- Fiona Ma, treasurer of California (2019–present) (Democratic)
- Gavin Newsom, governor of California (2019–present) (Democratic)
- Shirley Weber, secretary of state of California (2021–present) (Democratic)

State legislators

- David Alvarez, AD-80 (2022–present) (Democratic)
- Jesse Arreguín, SD-07 (2024–present) (Democratic)
- Angelique Ashby, majority leader of the state senate (2025–present) from SD-08 (2022–present) (Democratic)
- Marc Berman, AD-23 (2016–present) (Democratic)
- Isaac Bryan, majority leader of the state assembly (2023) from AD-55 (2021–present) (Democratic)
- Anna Caballero, SD-14 (2018–present) (Democratic)
- Juan Carrillo, AD-39 (2022–present) (Democratic)
- Sabrina Cervantes, SD-31 (2024–present) (Democratic)
- Mike Fong, AD-49 (2022–present) (Democratic)
- John Harabedian, AD-41 (2024–present) (Democratic)
- Monique Limón, president pro tempore of the state senate (2025–present) from SD-21 (2020–present) (Democratic)
- Stephanie Nguyen, AD-10 (2022–present) (Democratic)
- Gail Pellerin, AD-28 (2022–present) (Democratic)
- Akilah Weber Pierson, SD-39 (2024–present) (Democratic)
- Robert A. Rivas, speaker of the state assembly (2023–present) from AD-29 (2018–present) (Democratic)
- Phil Ting, former AD-19 (2012–2024) (Democratic)
- Scott Wiener, SD-11 (2016–present) (Democratic)

Local officials

- David Chiu, San Francisco city attorney (2021–present) (Democratic)
- Janice Hahn, member of the Los Angeles County Board of Supervisors from the 4th district (2016–present) (Democratic)
- Lindsey Horvath, member of the Los Angeles County Board of Supervisors from the 3rd district (2022–present) (Democratic)
- Adena Ishii, mayor of Berkeley (2024–present) (Democratic)
- Holly Mitchell, member of the Los Angeles County Board of Supervisors from the 2nd district (2020–present) (Democratic)
- Hilda Solis, member of the Los Angeles County Board of Supervisors from the 1st district (2014–present) (Democratic)
- Monica Montgomery Steppe, member of the San Diego County Board of Supervisors from the 4th district (2023–present) (Democratic)
- Alan Wong, member of the San Francisco Board of Supervisors from the 4th district (2025–present) (Democratic)

Individuals

- Matt A. Barreto, political scientist
- Erwin Chemerinsky, dean of the UC Berkeley School of Law
- Rusty Hicks, chair of the California Democratic Party
- Dolores Huerta, labor leader (deceased)
- Justin Levitt, constitutional law scholar
- Dan Newman, political consultant
- Kathleen Unger, attorney

Labor unions

- AFSCME California
- California Faculty Association
- California Federation of Teachers
- California Labor Federation
- California Nurses Association
- California School Employees Association
- California State Council of Laborers
- California Teachers Association
- Communications Workers of America District 9
- IBEW Local 332
- IFPTE Local 21
- International Association of Sheet Metal, Air, Rail and Transportation Workers Local 104
- International Union of Painters and Allied Trades District Council 16
- Los Angeles County Federation of Labor
- National Union of Healthcare Workers
- SEIU California
- SEIU-UHW
- State Building and Construction Trades Council of California
- Teamsters Joint Council 7
- UNITE HERE Local 11
- United Domestic Workers
- United Farm Workers
- United Food and Commercial Workers Western States Council
- United Teachers Los Angeles
- United Videogame Workers

Organizations

- 350 Bay Area
- Abundant Housing LA
- ACLU California Action
- ACLU of Northern California
- ACLU of Southern California
- Alice B. Toklas LGBTQ Democratic Club
- American Association of University Women California
- Asian Law Caucus
- Asian Pacific Environmental Network Action
- Bend the Arc Jewish Action California
- CAIR California
- California Democratic Socialists of America
- California Environmental Voters
- California Medical Association
- California State PTA
- California Young Democrats
- Chinese for Affirmative Action
- Chinese Progressive Association
- Clean Water Action
- Coalition for Humane Immigrant Rights of Los Angeles
- Common Cause California
- Consumer Watchdog
- Courage California
- Democrats Abroad
- Ella Baker Center Action Fund
- Environmental Health Coalition
- Equality California
- Evelyn and Walter Haas Jr. Fund
- Friends Committee on Legislation of California
- GrowSF
- Harvey Milk LGBTQ Democratic Club
- Indivisible SF
- John George Democratic Club
- League of Women Voters of California
- Los Angeles LGBT Center
- Mexican American Legal Defense and Educational Fund
- NAACP California/Hawaii State Conference
- National Action Network Sacramento
- Natural Resources Defense Council
- Our Revolution East Bay
- PICO California
- Planned Parenthood Affiliates of California
- San Diego Democrats for Equality
- San Diego Pride
- San Francisco Foundation
- San Francisco League of Pissed Off Voters
- San Francisco Rising Action Fund
- San Francisco Tenants Union
- San Francisco Women's Political Committee
- Sierra Club Angeles
- SPUR
- Stonewall Young Democrats
- Strategic Actions for a Just Economy
- SV@Home Action Fund
- TransForm
- UCLA Voting Rights Project
- United Way Bay Area
- VoteRiders
- Women's Foundation California

Political parties

- California Democratic Party
- California Working Families Party
- Freedom Socialist Party
- Green Party of California
- Libertarian Party of California
- Peace and Freedom Party

Newspapers and media

- The Bakersfield Californian
- Bay Area Reporter
- Berkeley Political Review
- Beverly Press
- The Daily Californian
- La Opinión
- Los Angeles Sentinel
- Monterey County Weekly
- Park La Brea News
- The San Diego Union-Tribune
- The San Diego Voice & Viewpoint
- San Francisco Bay Guardian
- San Francisco Chronicle
- San Mateo Daily Journal
- Santa Barbara Independent
- Santa Cruz Sentinel
- Sing Tao Daily
- 7 Bay Area News Group-owned newspapers:
  - Argus-Courier
  - East Bay Times
  - Lake County Record-Bee
  - Marin Independent Journal
  - The Mercury News
  - The Press Democrat
  - Ukiah Daily Journal
- 5 McClatchy Media-owned newspapers:
  - The Fresno Bee
  - Merced Sun-Star
  - The Modesto Bee
  - The Sacramento Bee
  - The Tribune

Government bodies

- Marin County Board of Supervisors
- Sacramento City Council
- Santa Clara County Board of Supervisors

== Polling ==
| Poll source | Date(s) administered | Sample size (Note: Key: A – all adults RV – registered voters LV – likely voters V – unclear) | Margin of error | Support | Oppose | Undecided |
|---|---|---|---|---|---|---|
| Berkeley IGS | October 19–25, 2026 | 1,477 (LV) | ± 3.0% | 37% | 57% | 5% |
| SurveyUSA (Note: Poll sponsored by KGTV and The San Diego Union-Tribune.) | October 19–24, 2026 | 799 (LV) | ± 5.3% | 49% | 42% | 10% |
| M3 Strategies (R) | October 21–23, 2026 | 489 (LV) | ± 4.4% | 47% | 53% | – |
| Public Policy Institute of California | October 16–22, 2026 | 1,086 (LV) | ± 3.8% | 41% | 58% | 1% |
| McLaughlin & Associates (R) (Note: Poll conducted for the California Post) | October 17–20, 2026 | 800 (LV) | – | 46% | 48% | 6% |
| Citrin/Politico | October 9–14, 2026 | 1,149 (RV) | ± 3.2% | 42% | 51% | 7% |
| Independent Voter Project | September 23 – October 2, 2026 | 2,906 (LV) | ± 2.5% | 43% | 40% | 17% |
| Mason-Dixon Polling & Research, Inc. (Note: Poll sponsored by NBCUniversal Local, Telemundo) | September 21–24, 2026 | 625 (LV) | ± 4.0% | 49% | 42% | 9% |
| Berkeley IGS | September 15–20, 2026 | 4,512 (LV) | ± 2.0% | 39% | 52% | 9% |
| SurveyUSA | September 15–20, 2026 | 742 (LV) | ± 4.6% | 48% | 38% | 13% |
| Public Policy Institute of California | September 4–10, 2026 | 1,103 (LV) | ± 3.8% | 43% | 55% | 1% |
| Berkeley IGS | August 3–9, 2026 | 2,310 (LV) | ± 2.5% | 42% | 51% | 7% |
| Public Policy Institute of California | May 14–18, 2026 | 986 (LV) | ± 3.2% | 49% | 51% | – |
| Berkeley IGS (Note: Poll sponsored by the Evelyn and Walter Haas Jr. Fund, which opposes the voter ID initiative.) | April 9–18, 2026 | 5,962 (RV) | ± 2.0% | 56% | 39% | 6% |
| Berkeley IGS (Note: Poll sponsored by the Los Angeles Times.) | March 9–15, 2026 | 5,109 (RV) | ± 2.0% | 44% | 45% | 12% |
