= 2020 California Proposition 16 =

Measure to undo the state's ban on affirmative action

Proposition 16
- November 3, 2020
- Repeals California Proposition 209

Results
Choice	Votes	%
Yes	7,217,064	42.77%
No	9,655,595	57.23%
Valid votes	16,872,659	94.87%
Invalid or blank votes	912,492	5.13%
Total votes	17,785,151	100.00%
Registered voters/turnout	22,047,448	80.67%

Against
90%–100%
80%–90%
70%–80%
60%–70%
50%–60%
For
90%–100%
80%–90%
70%–80%
60%–70%
50%–60%

2020 California Proposition 16

California State Legislature
- Full name: Assembly Constitutional Amendment No. 5
- Introduced: 2019-01-18
- Assembly voted: 2020-06-10 (60-14)
- Senate voted: 2020-06-24 (30-10)
- Sponsor(s): Weber, Gipson, and Santiago
- Governor: Gavin Newsom
- Code: California state constitution, Section 31, Article 1 (Proposition 209)
- Resolution: ACA 5
- Website: Full text of the bill

Proposition 16 was a failed California ballot proposition that appeared on the November 3, 2020, general election ballot, asking California voters to amend the Constitution of California to repeal Proposition 209 (1996). Proposition 209 amended the state constitution to prohibit government institutions from discriminating or offering prefferential treatment on the basis of race, sex, or ethnicity, specifically in the areas of public employment, public contracting, and public education. Therefore, Proposition 209 banned the use of race- and gender-based affirmative action in California's public sector and public university admissions.

The legislatively referred state constitutional amendment was originally introduced as California Assembly Constitutional Amendment No. 5 (ACA 5) by Democratic Assembly Members Weber, Gipson, and Santiago on January 18, 2019. In June 2020, the California State Legislature passed ACA 5 on a mostly party-line vote, voting 60–14 on June 10 in the Assembly and 30–10 on June 24 in the Senate. The measure was defeated 57% to 43%.

== Background ==
Proposition 16 would have repealed 1996 California Proposition 209 which amended the California constitution and prohibits government institutions from considering race, sex, or ethnicity, specifically in the areas of public employment, public contracting, and public education. Before Proposition 209, state and local entities had policies and programs—collectively called "affirmative action"—intended to increase opportunities and representation for people who faced inequalities as a result of their race, sex, color, ethnicity, or national origin. For example, the state had established programs to increase the participation of women-owned and minority-owned businesses in public contracts and set goals for the portion of state contracts that were awarded to those types of businesses.

In 1996, California voters approved Proposition 209, adding a new section to the State Constitution as Section 31 of Article I. The new section generally banned the consideration of race, sex, color, ethnicity, or national origin in public employment, public education, and public contracting in California with limited exceptions. After voters approved Proposition 209, some public entities in California created or modified policies and programs to instead consider characteristics not banned by Proposition 209. For example, many California public universities provide outreach and support programs for students who are first in their family to attend college. Many university campuses also consider where students attended high school and where they live when making admissions decisions. The universities view these policies and programs as ways to increase diversity without violating Proposition 209.

The California and federal constitutions provide all people equal protection, which generally means that people in similar situations are treated similarly under the law. Federal law establishes a right to equal protection and as a result limits how "protected classes" such as race and gender may be used in decision-making. For example, under federal law as of 2020, universities might consider these characteristics as one of several factors when making admission decisions in an effort to make their campuses more diverse. (This was overruled by the Supreme Court of the United States in 2023, guaranteeing the right to all college applicants to not be discriminated against in admissions on account of their race.) To ensure compliance with federal law, these policies and programs must meet certain conditions that limit the consideration of these characteristics. These conditions are intended to prevent discrimination that violates equal protection. State law also has a number of anti-discrimination provisions that are similar to those in federal law. Before Proposition 209, state and local policies and programs that considered race, sex, color, ethnicity, or national origin still had to comply with federal law. Since such discrimination was already illegal based on state law, federal law, and the Equal Protection Clause of the 14th Amendment, Proposition 209 effectively banned affirmative action within these public bodies.

Affirmative action has its origins in Executive Order 10925, which was issued by President John F. Kennedy and required government contractors to "take affirmative action to ensure that applicants are employed, and employees are treated during employment, without regard to their race, creed, color, or national origin." Kennedy's Executive Order was superseded by Executive Order 11246, which was issued by President Lyndon B. Johnson on September 24, 1965, and prohibits federal contractors and federally assisted construction contractors and subcontractors, who do business with the federal government, from discriminating in employment decisions on the basis of race, color, religion, sex, or national origin. In 1967, President Johnson amended the order to include gender on the list of attributes. Executive Order 11246 also requires federal contractors to take affirmative action to promote the full realization of equal opportunity for women and minorities. Since that time, various affirmative action programs have been created in California as well as the broader United States, to both redress disadvantages associated with past and present discrimination as well as ensure public institutions, such as universities, hospitals, and police forces, are more representative (e.g. by race or gender) of the populations they serve. On January 21, 2025, several years after Proposition 16 was voted down, President Donald J. Trump issued an executive order entitled "Ending Illegal Discrimination and Restoring Merit-Based Opportunity" which in part revoked Executive Order 11246.

Led by University of California Regent Ward Connerly and endorsed by Governor Pete Wilson, Proposition 209 appeared on the ballot in California as a constitutional amendment on November 5, 1996, and was approved by voters. Proposition 209 amended the Constitution of California to prohibit government institutions from "[discriminating] against, or [granting] preferential treatment to, any individual or group on the basis of race, sex, color, ethnicity, or national origin in the operation of public employment, public education, or public contracting." For these purposes, California's Constitution defines "the state" to include the state, any city, county, public university system, community college district, school district, special district, or any other political subdivision or governmental instrumentality of, or within, the state.

Since the passage of Proposition 209, there have been several legislative attempts to repeal sections of Proposition 209. In 2011, SB 185 would have permitted affirmative action in public higher education, but was ultimately vetoed by Governor Brown citing possible conflicts with Proposition 209. In 2014, California Senate Constitutional Amendment No. 5 would have done the similar if passed by voters, but was shelved due to strong opposition. Proposition 16 represents the first time a repeal of Proposition 209 has appeared on the ballot.

=== College admissions ===
In Fisher v. University of Texas (2016) the Supreme Court held that public colleges and universities may consider race as one of many factors as part of their admissions decisions when race-neutral alternatives are insufficient to build a racially diverse student body. They may not use quotas or race-based point systems for this purpose, as the Supreme Court already ruled in Regents of the Univ. of Cal. v. Bakke (1978) and Gratz v. Bollinger (2003) that those affirmative actions schemes are federally unconstitutional. Prior to Proposition 209, some of California's public universities considered race and ethnicity as factors when making admissions decisions and offered programs to support the academic achievement of those students. After Proposition 209, these considerations were banned.

Some public universities in California created or modified policies and programs to instead consider characteristics not banned by Proposition 209, such as socioeconomic status and geography. For example, UC Berkeley considers "contextual factors that bear directly upon the applicant’s achievement, including linguistic background, parental education level, and other indicators of support available in the home." Moreover, all UC schools utilize a review that takes into account 14 factors including academic performance, special talents, and special circumstances. According to the California legislative analyst, many of the state's universities provide outreach and support programs for students who are first in their family to attend college. Many university campuses also consider where students attended high school and where they live when making admissions decisions. The universities view these policies and programs as ways to increase diversity without violating Proposition 209.

A longitudinal study by UC Berkeley Center for Studies in Higher Education researcher and then-economics PhD candidate Zachary Bleemer on the impact of Proposition 209 on student outcomes using a difference-in-difference research design and a newly constructed database linking all 1994-2002 University of California applicants to their college enrollment, course performance, major choice, degree attainment, and wages into their mid-30s found “the first causal evidence that banning affirmative action exacerbates socioeconomic inequities.” The study found “Proposition 209 instigated a dramatic change in UC admissions policy, with underrepresented group (URG) enrollment at the Berkeley and UCLA campuses immediately falling by more than 60 percent and systemwide URG enrollment falling by at least 12 percent.” Also according to the window studied (after race- and gender-based affirmative action was banned but before socioeconomic preferences were introduced), the immediate ban on affirmative action reduced Black and Latino students' likelihood of graduating and attending graduate school, and resulted in a decline in wages. At the same time, the report found that the policy did not significantly impact wages of white and Asian American students. This study has since been published in the Quarterly Journal of Economics.

A rebuttal to Bleemer's study by UCLA Professor of Law Richard Sander argued that Bleemer's claims are incorrect and that URM enrollment reached pre-Prop 209 levels by 2000. Sander also argued that Proposition 209 reduced negative mismatch effects, leading to an increase in the number of URM STEM graduates while the national trend was flat. Sander finally noted that due to the university withholding admissions data from outside researchers that Bleemer's research is not reproducible by outside researchers.

William Kidder, a research associate at the UCLA Civil Rights Project rebuts Sander's rebuttal stating "Professor Sander’s claims about Prop 209 in his rebuttal to the Bleemer paper are not consistent with the overall body of relevant peer-reviewed scholarship. Rather, Mr. Bleemer’s findings about URM enrollment, graduation rates and earnings under Prop 209 are broadly consistent with the preponderance of peer-reviewed research studies."

=== Public contracting and employment ===
Prior to the passage of Proposition 209, California state government and many local governments had affirmative action programs in place for minority and women business enterprises, where the state aimed to award a certain portion of state contracts to those types of businesses. As Proposition 209 barred state and local agencies from considering race and gender in public contracting decisions, these decisions were made on other bases, such as price or quality. Therefore, the end of affirmative action programs in contracting led to lower prices for state contracts, saving California taxpayers money. After the passage of Proposition 209, the prices on state funded contracts fell by 5.6 percent relative to federally funded projects, for which race or gender preferences were still applied. As of 2020, this amounted to $1 billion to $1.1 billion saved annually through contracts awarded on the basis of merit, rather than awarded to minority- and women-owned businesses solely due to their sex or ethnicity.

Current law prohibits school districts in California from considering student or teacher race in funding, outreach, and hiring.

== Legislative analysis ==
The proposition is officially titled Allows Diversity as a Factor in Public Employment, Education, and Contracting Decisions. Legislative Constitutional Amendment. According to California's Legislative Analyst, proposition 16 permits considering race, sex, color, ethnicity, or national origin in government decision-making policies to address diversity in the operation of public employment, education, or contracting. The proposition does not change any fiscal policies, though there are uncertain effects depending on subsequent changes in hiring processes.

=== Constitutional changes ===
The measure would repeal Section 31 of Article I of the California Constitution. The following text would be repealed:

1. The State shall not discriminate against, or grant preferential treatment to, any individual or group on the basis of race, sex, color, ethnicity, or national origin in the operation of public employment, public education, or public contracting.
2. This section shall apply only to action taken after the section's effective date.
3. Nothing in this section shall be interpreted as prohibiting bona fide qualifications based on sex which are reasonably necessary to the normal operation of public employment, public education, or public contracting.
4. Nothing in this section shall be interpreted as invalidating any court order or consent decree which is in force as of the effective date of this section.
5. Nothing in this section shall be interpreted as prohibiting action which must be taken to establish or maintain eligibility for any federal program, where ineligibility would result in a loss of federal funds to the State.
6. For the purposes of this section, "State" shall include, but not necessarily be limited to, the State itself, any city, county, city and county, public university system, including the University of California, community college district, school district, special district, or any other political subdivision or governmental instrumentality of or within the State.
7. The remedies available for violations of this section shall be the same, regardless of the injured party's race, sex, color, ethnicity, or national origin, as are otherwise available for violations of then-existing California antidiscrimination law.
8. This section shall be self-executing. If any part or parts of this section are found to be in conflict with federal law or the United States Constitution, the section shall be implemented to the maximum extent that federal law and the United States Constitution permit. Any provision held invalid shall be severable from the remaining portions of this section.

== Campaign ==
=== Official arguments ===
Official arguments from California State Voter Guide
In support	In opposition
YES on Prop. 16 means EQUAL OPPORTUNITY FOR ALL CALIFORNIANS. All of us deserve equal opportunities to thrive with fair wages, good jobs, and quality schools. Despite living in the most diverse state in the nation, white men are still overrepresented in positions of wealth and power in California. Although women, and especially women of color, are on the front lines of the COVID-19 response, they are not rewarded for their sacrifices. Women should have the same chance of success as men. Today, nearly all public contracts, and the jobs that go with them, go to large companies run by older white men. White women make 80¢ on the dollar. The wage disparity is even worse for women of color and single moms. As a result, an elite few are able to hoard wealth instead of investing it back into communities. Prop. 16 opens up contracting opportunities for women and people of color. We know that small businesses are the backbone of our economy. Yet, Main Street businesses owned by women and people of color lose over $1,100,000,000 in government contracts every year because of the current law. We need to support those small businesses, especially as we rebuild from COVID-19. Wealth will be invested back into our communities. YES on Prop. 16 helps rebuild California stronger with fair opportunities for all. YES on Prop. 16 means: Supporting women and women of color who serve disproportionately as essential caregivers/frontline workers during COVID-19; Expanding access to solid wages, good jobs, and quality schools for all Californians, regardless of gender, race, or ethnicity; Creating opportunities for women and people of color to receive public contracts that should be available to all of us; Improving access to quality education, both K–12 schools and higher education, for all of California's kids; Taking action to prevent discrimination and ensure equal opportunity for all; Rebuilding an economy that treats everyone equally; Investing wealth back into our communities as opposed to continuing to allow the rich to get richer; Strong anti-discrimination laws remain in effect; Quotas are still prohibited; We live in the middle of an incredible historic moment. In 2020, we have seen an unprecedented number of Californians take action against systemic racism and voice their support for real change. At the same time, our shared values are under attack by the Trump administration's policies. We are seeing the rise of overt racism: white supremacists on the march, the daily demonization of Latino immigrants, Black people gunned-down in our streets, anti-Asian hate crimes on the rise, women's rights under attack, and COVID-19 ravaging Native communities. By voting YES on Prop. 16, Californians can take action to push back against the Trump administration's racist agenda. By voting YES on Prop. 16, Californians can take action to push back against racism and sexism and create a more just and fair state for all. Equal opportunity matters. Yes on Prop. 16. VoteYesOnProp16.org CAROL MOON GOLDBERG, President League of Women Voters of California THOMAS A. SAENZ, President Mexican American Legal Defense and Educational Fund EVA PATERSON, President Equal Justice Society	The California Legislature wants you to strike these precious words from our state Constitution: "The state shall not discriminate against, or grant preferential treatment to, any individual or group, on the basis of race, sex, color, ethnicity, or national origin in the operation of public employment, public education, or public contracting." Don't do it! Vote NO. Those words—adopted by California voters in 1996 as Proposition 209—should remain firmly in place. Only by treating everyone equally can a state as brilliantly diverse as California be fair to everyone. REPEAL WOULD BE A STEP BACKWARD Discrimination of this kind is poisonous. It will divide us at a time we desperately need to unite. Politicians want to give preferential treatment to their favorites. They think they can "fix" past discrimination against racial minorities and women by discriminating against other racial minorities and men who are innocent of any wrongdoing. Punishing innocent people will only cause a never-ending cycle of resentment. The only way to stop discrimination is to stop discriminating. HELP THOSE WHO REALLY NEED IT Not every Asian American or white is advantaged. Not every Latino or black is disadvantaged. Our state has successful men and women of all races and ethnicities. Let's not perpetuate the stereotype that minorities and women can't make it unless they get special preferences. At the same time, our state also has men and women—of all races and ethnicities—who could use a little extra break. Current law allows for "affirmative action" of this kind so long as it doesn't discriminate or give preferential treatment based on race, sex, color, ethnicity or national origin. For example, state universities can give a leg-up for students from low-income families or students who would be the first in their family to attend college. The state can help small businesses started by low-income individuals or favor low-income individuals for job opportunities. But if these words are stricken from our state Constitution, the University of California will again be free to give a wealthy lawyer's son a preference for admission over a farmworker's daughter simply because he's from an “under-represented” group. That's unjust. GIVE TAXPAYERS A BREAK Prior to the passage of Proposition 209, California and many local governments maintained costly bureaucracies that required preferential treatment in public contracting based on a business owner's race, sex or ethnicity. The lowest qualified bidder could be rejected. A careful, peer-reviewed study by a University of California economist found that CalTrans contracts governed by Proposition 209 saved 5.6% over non-209 contracts in the two-year period after it took effect. If the savings for other government contracts are anywhere near that, repealing this constitutional provision could cost taxpayers many BILLIONS of dollars. EQUAL RIGHTS ARE FUNDAMENTAL Prohibiting preferential treatment based on race, sex, color, ethnicity or national origin is a fundamental part of the American creed. It's there in our Constitution for all of us. . .now and for future generations. Don't throw it away. VOTE NO. WARD CONNERLY, President Californians for Equal Rights GAIL HERIOT, Professor of Law BETTY TOM CHU, Former California Constitution Revision Commissioner

=== Support ===
The Opportunity for All Coalition, also known as Yes on Prop 16, was leading the campaign in support of Proposition 16. In the California State Legislature, Asm. Shirley Weber (D-79) was the lead sponsor of the constitutional amendment. Chairpersons of Yes on 16 include Eva Paterson, president of the Equal Justice Society; Vincent Pan, co-executive director of Chinese for Affirmative Action; and Thomas Saenz, president of the Mexican American Legal Defense and Educational Fund. A commercial released by the 'Yes on 16' campaign suggested that to oppose the initiative was to side with white supremacy.

=== Opposition ===
Californians for Equal Rights, also known as No on 16, led the campaign in opposition to Proposition 16. Ward Connerly, who was chairperson of the campaign behind California Proposition 209 (1996), is president of Californians for Equal Rights.

Opponents of Proposition 16 primarily cited the divisive, discriminatory, and constitutionally questionable nature of Proposition 16, as well as the positive results Proposition 209 has yielded for underrepresented students at California's public universities since its implementation. They also point to deeper, socio-economic issues that must be addressed to achieve better outcomes for underrepresented minorities (URMs), including improving public school outcomes and options for URMs in public K-12 education, inefficient public education spending, unequal access, lack of parental involvement, community segregation, and a shortage of qualified teachers. Under Proposition 209, California universities and government hiring may still consider economic background in the admissions process, but may not use race. Finally, Proposition 16 opponents believed that Proposition 16 was not a true affirmative action program, but was aimed at legalizing discrimination and government-sanctioned racial favoritism.

== Response ==
- U.S. Rep. Karen Bass (D-37): "Proposition 209, deceptively titled the California Civil Rights Initiative, passed by referendum in 1996 amidst an orchestrated campaign of dog-whistle politics attacking all attempts to level the playing field for women and people of color. Before Prop 209, those efforts at advancing equity had made real progress. But the Wall Street-backed authors of the initiative saw a threat to their economic stranglehold from an increasingly diverse and highly educated population in California; a population better situated to compete in jobs, education, government contracts and other areas of the state’s economy. In passing Prop 209, those groups limited competition in their industries and benefited their own businesses by erecting new institutional barriers burdening the ability of California’s women and people of color achieve positions of economic and business leadership."
- University of California President Janet Napolitano: "It makes little sense to exclude any consideration of race in admissions when the aim of the University’s holistic process is to fully understand and evaluate each applicant through multiple dimensions. Proposition 209 has forced California public institutions to try to address racial inequality without factoring in race, even where allowed by federal law. The diversity of our university and higher education institutions across California, should — and must — represent the rich diversity of our state."
- Varsha Sarveshwar, president of the University of California Student Association: "Today, colleges can consider whether you’re from the suburbs, a city or a rural area. They can consider what high school you went to. They can consider your family’s economic background. They can look at virtually everything about you – but not race. It makes no sense – and is unfair – that schools can’t consider something that is so core to our lived experience. Repealing Prop. 209 will not create quotas or caps. These are illegal under a Supreme Court decision and would remain so."
- Otto Lee, former mayor of Sunnyvale, California, and founder of the Intellectual Property Law Group LLP: "With President Trump’s latest proclamations of Chinese virus, or “Kung Flu,” many Asian Americans recently have experienced racial discrimination and have been told to “Go back to China.” As a Chinese American, I recognize the urgent need for us to build bridges with all people of color, as discrimination against one is discrimination against all. We must stand tall together to call out these unacceptable behaviors and not allow ACA 5 to become a wedge that divides us."
- Gaurav Khanna, assistant professor of economics, UC San Diego School of Global Policy and Strategy: "Affirmative action makes going to a good college much more attainable, and actually encourages minority groups to work harder to get into such schools. Without affirmative action, many colleges may not appear attainable, and it may discourage students from even trying."
- Asm. Shirley Weber (D-79), the principal sponsor of the constitutional amendment and chairwoman of the Legislative Black Caucus, stated the following:
1. "Californians have built the fifth largest and strongest economy in the world, but too many hardworking Californians are not sharing in our state’s prosperity—particularly women, families of color, and low-wage workers. Assembly Constitutional Amendment 5 will help improve all of our daily lives by repealing Proposition 209 and eliminating discrimination in state contracts, hiring and education. [ACA 5] is about equal opportunity for all and investment in our communities."
2. “Since becoming law in 1996, Proposition 209 has cost women- and minority-owned businesses $1.1 billion each year...It has perpetuated a wage gap wherein women make 80 cents on every dollar made by men and has allowed discriminatory hiring and contracting processes to continue unhindered.”
3. "As we look around the world, we see there is an urgent cry — an urgent cry for change. After 25 years of quantitative and qualitative data, we see that race-neutral solutions cannot fix problems steeped in race."
4. "The ongoing pandemic, as well as recent tragedies of police violence, is forcing Californians to acknowledge the deep-seated inequality and far-reaching institutional failures that show that your race and gender still matter.”

Similar arguments for support were summarized as follows in ACA 5's bill analysis:

California is currently the fifth-largest economy in the world and has the world's largest system of higher education. Despite this, women and people of color are not getting their fair share of opportunities to get ahead:

- A 2015 study showed that businesses owned by women and people of color lose $1.1 billion annually in government contracts.
- Women in California earn only 80 cents for every dollar a man earns on average, and women of color and single moms make less than 60 cents on the dollar for the same work as their white male counterparts.
- Just a third of leadership and tenured faculty positions at the California Community Colleges, California State University, and the University of California are held by Black, Latino, or Asian-American scholars.
- At the UC, women make up 54 percent of enrolled students, but just one-third of the tenured faculty and less than a third of the members of the Board of Regents.

- Richard D. Kahlenberg, a senior fellow at the Century Foundation in Washington, D.C.: "Because it is much cheaper to provide racial preferences to upper middle class Latino and African American students than it is to do the hard work of recruiting economically disadvantaged and working-class Latino and African American students, I fear that many of these progressive reforms could be diluted if 209 is repealed."
- Richard Sander, a UCLA law professor: (Prop 209 is) "arguably the best thing that ever happened to racial minorities because it pushed UC campuses to heavily invest in their academic preparation and helped raise their graduation rates."
- Former U.S. Rep. Tom Campbell (R): "Nevertheless, if more spaces are to be made for the under-represented, they must come from the over-represented. Asian Americans are 15.3 percent of Californians, yet 39.72 percent of UC enrollees. Those numbers are why bringing this issue forward now would inevitably divide Californians racially: Latino Americans and African Americans on one side, Asian Americans on the other. The politics are inescapably racial."
- Wen Fa, an attorney with the Pacific Legal Foundation: "We’re definitely going to take a hard look at that and see whether it complies with the 14th Amendment, or whether it violates the constitutional principle of equality before the law."
- Asm. Steven S. Choi (R-68): "Is it right to give someone a job just because they are white, or black or green or yellow? Or just because they are male? Repealing Proposition 209, enacted by voters 24 years ago, is to repeal the prohibition of judgment based on race, sex, color, ethnicity and national origin. We are talking about legalizing racism and sexism."
- Sen. Ling Ling Chang (R-29): "I have experienced racial discrimination so I know what that’s like. But the answer to racial discrimination is not more discrimination which is what this bill proposes. The answer is to strengthen our institutions by improving our education system so all students have access to a quality education, and give opportunities to those who are economically disadvantaged."
- Michelle Steel, chairwoman of the Orange County Board of Supervisors: "The Californians who voted to pass Prop. 209 knew that discrimination, though long entrenched in our society, is against the fundamental values of American culture. Prop. 209 applied to California the essence of Martin Luther King Jr.’s dream of a nation where individuals would be judged not by the color of their skin but by the content of their character."
- Former Senate Minority Leader Bob Huff (R): "California is the most diverse state in the nation and must step up to the challenges that brings. The real solution for racial equality is comprehensive public-school reform in our K-12 system, not government sanctioned discrimination to create more losers than winners as Proposition 16 will do."
- Ward Connerly, chairperson of the campaign behind Proposition 209: "The fundamental nature of our nation is that we are a collection of free people who have rights given to us by our Creator. Liberty and equality are precious rights deemed essential to our pursuit of that which fulfills our objective of happiness. More than just for the pursuit of happiness, however, equality is essential to the maintenance of a civil society. This is especially so in a state now identified as a “majority minority” state. ... I ask you all to vote No on Proposition 16, which would delete that commitment to equality from the California Constitution."
- Haibo Huang, co-founder of San Diego Asian Americans for Equality: "Race is a forbidden classification for good reason, because it demeans the dignity and worth of a person to be judged by ancestry instead of his or her own merit and essential qualities. Racial preference is not transformed from patently unconstitutional into a compelling state interest simply by relabeling it racial diversity. ... Judging people by their skin color is morally repugnant. Equal opportunity is referenced to individual merits, it never guarantees equal results. To the contrary, enforcing equal outcome regardless of qualification and effort bears the hallmark of communism."

=== Asian Americans ===
The debate about affirmative action has drawn strong opinions from both supporters and opponents within the Asian American community. The debate has largely centered around affirmative action in college admissions. As of 2020, Asian Americans are the only over-represented student ethnic group in "more selective" public colleges in California and make up the largest proportion of undergraduate enrollment at the University of California.

Asian Americans mobilized on both in support of and in opposition to Proposition 16. There were longstanding Asian American civil rights groups including Asian Americans Advancing Justice - Asian Law Caucus, Asian Americans Advancing Justice - Los Angeles, Asian Pacific American Labor Alliance, Japanese American Citizens League, Chinese for Affirmative Action, and Organization of Chinese Americans among others that support Proposition 16. Many in these groups believed that affirmative action "lifts everyone up together and gives all people of color better access to education and opportunities," that affirmative action benefits Asian Americans, and that affirmative action remains necessary to address systemic racism.

On the other side, the opposition included the 80-20 Educational Foundation, Asian American Coalition for Education, and the Silicon Valley Chinese Association Foundation, among others. Many in these groups believed that Prop. 16 and affirmative action policies in general discriminate against Asian Americans. Nearly 5,700 Asian American individuals donated to the "No On Prop 16" campaign, representing 95% of donors to the campaign.

== Polling ==
Public opinion of affirmative action may vary depending on question framing and survey design.

Poll source	Date(s) administered	Sample size	Margin of error	For Proposition 16	Against Proposition 16	Undecided
UC Berkeley Institute of Governmental Studies	October 16–21, 2020	5,352 (LV)	–	38%	49%	13%
David Binder Research	October 17–19, 2020	600 (LV)	± 4%	45%	45%	10%
Public Policy Institute of California	October 9–18, 2020	1,185 (LV)	± 4.3%	37%	50%	13%
Ipsos/Spectrum News	October 7–15, 2020	1,400 (A)	± 3%	38%	28%	34%
SurveyUSA (Note: SurveyUSA survey presented only the measure's title, rather than a summary. This difference in methods may lead to different results when compared to other polls.)	September 26–28, 2020	588 (LV)	± 5.4%	40%	26%	34%
UC Berkeley Institute of Governmental Studies	September 9–15, 2020	5,942 (LV)	± 2%	33%	41%	26%
Public Policy Institute of California	September 4–13, 2020	1,168 (LV)	± 4.3%	31%	47%	22%

=== Racial/ethnic crosstabulations ===
UC Berkeley Institute of Governmental Studies – October 2020
Group	For Proposition 16	Against Proposition 16	Undecided
White	35%	53%	12%
Black	58%	33%	10%
Asian	39%	50%	11%
Latino	40%	42%	17%
Native American	22%	74%	4%

UC Berkeley Institute of Governmental Studies – September 2020
Group	For Proposition 16	Against Proposition 16	Undecided
White	28%	46%	26%
Black	51%	28%	21%
Asian	42%	33%	25%
Latino	40%	33%	27%

==== Community organizations ====
Poll source	Date(s) administered	Sample size	Margin of error	For Proposition 16	Against Proposition 16	Undecided
Latino Community Foundation	August 24, 2020	1200 Latino RV	± 2.8%	51%	43%	6%
Asian American Voter Survey	September 15, 2020	609 Asian American RV	Not available	35%	21%	36%

== Results ==
Proposition 16
Choice	Votes	%
For	7,217,064	42.77
Against	9,655,595	57.23
Total	16,872,659	100.00
Valid votes	16,872,659	94.87
Invalid/blank votes	912,492	5.13
Total votes	17,785,151	100.00
Registered voters/turnout	22,047,448	80.67
Source: Statement of Vote at the Wayback Machine (archived October 3, 2025)

Proposition 16 results (excluding invalid votes)
Yes; 7,217,064 (42.8%)	No; 9,655,595 (57.2%)
▲50%

== See also ==
- 1996 California Proposition 209
- 2003 California Proposition 54
- California Senate Constitutional Amendment No. 5

=== Related state measures regarding affirmative action ===
- 1998 Washington Initiative 200
- 2006 Michigan Civil Rights Initiative
- 2008 Nebraska Initiative 424
- 2008 Colorado Amendment 46
