= 2026 Bay Area Regional Measure RTM =

Regional Measure RTM
- November 3, 2026
- Regional Transit Measure

Results
Choice	Votes	%
Yes	805,292	62.24%
No	488,480	37.76%
Total votes	1,160,786	100.00%
- County results Yes 70–80% 60–70% 50–60%

Regional Measure RTM (the Regional Transit Measure) is a regional sales tax ballot measure in the 2026 elections in five of the nine counties of the San Francisco Bay Area in California. It originated as California Senate Bill 63 (SB 63), titled the Connect Bay Area Act, a 2025 California bill signed into law, which allowed the proposal to go before Bay Area voters after a voter initiative. The measure would impose a 14-year sales tax increase of 0.5% in San Mateo, Santa Clara, Contra Costa, and Alameda counties, and 1% in San Francisco county, with revenue funding transit operations and improvements in those five counties. The four North Bay counties of Marin, Napa, Solano and Sonoma are excluded. The estimated revenue would be $980 million each year.

== Provisions ==
The measure authorizes a 14-year sales tax, levying a half-cent tax in Alameda, Contra Costa, San Mateo, and Santa Clara counties, and a one-cent tax in San Francisco. In addition to funding, it requires operators receiving funds to adhere to the Metropolitan Transportation Commission (MTC)'s Regional Network Management policies. These policies are designed to improve coordination through measures such as free or discounted transfers, schedule alignment, unified wayfinding, and transit priority on streets. The measure also mandates that agencies undergo third-party financial efficiency reviews to identify potential cost savings and submit implementation plans to the MTC.

== Background ==
Senate Bill 63 was developed in response to structural deficits for Bay Area transit agencies facing depleted pandemic-era federal relief funds, including San Francisco, which is also considering a new parcel tax to fund Muni. The bill is a smaller successor to the 2024 Senate Bill 1031, a more ambitious nine-county plan to raise $1.5 billion annually that failed due to disputes over the tax type and how revenue would be allocated. It also follows a 2023 proposal by State Senator Scott Wiener to increase tolls on the region's bridges to fund transit.

== Legislative history ==
Senator Scott Wiener introduced Senate Bill 63 in March 2025, along with co-author Senator Jesse Arreguin. It initially included only Contra Costa, Alameda and San Francisco counties.

- June 2, 2025: The bill was approved by the California State Senate in a 28–10 vote.
- August 2025: San Mateo and Santa Clara counties agreed to join the compact.
- September 2025: The bill passed the full California State Legislature.
- October 2025: Governor Gavin Newsom signed the bill into law.

The Connect Bay Area Act created two pathways for a measure to be on the ballot: a transit board vote or a citizen initiative path. Supporters chose to collect voter signatures to make it a citizen initiative, meaning the measure needs only a simple majority instead of two-thirds under state law. Supporters collected more than 241,000 signatures, but only 186,000 were needed to place it on the ballot.

== Impact ==
The RTM measure would support operations at transit agencies including BART, AC Transit, Caltrain, and SFMTA, among others. Nearly two-thirds of the funds will keep existing service, a third would be allocated to efficiency improvements, and the remainder would support enhancements like better wayfinding and signage.

San Mateo estimated that by 2031 the tax would bring in $135 million annually, $32.5 million of which would be used for Caltrain. Santa Clara expects to receive $264 million annually. The MTC expects the tax to generate $980 million annually across the five counties.

The law sets detailed fixed percentage allocations. The table below shows a summary of these percentages and estimated dollar amounts (assuming $980 million in annual revenue).

Category	Sub-entity / Program	% Allocation (Fixed by Law)	Est. Annual Funding (at $980M total)
	Administration	0.22%	$2,156,000
	Regional transit transformation programs	4.44%	$43,512,000
Large Operators	BART	31%	$303,800,000
Large Operators	Muni	16%	$156,800,000
Large Operators	AC Transit	5%	$49,000,000
Large Operators	Caltrain	7%	$68,600,000
Small Operators	Alameda County small operators	0.5%	$4,900,000
Small Operators	Contra Costa County small operators	1.5%	$14,700,000
Small Operators	San Francisco Bay Ferry	0.7%	$6,860,000
Small Operators	Golden Gate Transit	0.1%	$980,000
Designated County Entity	Alameda County Transportation Commission	1%	$9,800,000
Designated County Entity	Contra Costa Transportation Authority	2.5%	$24,500,000
Designated County Entity	San Francisco County Transportation Authority	0%	$0
Designated County Entity	San Mateo County Transit District	4.7%	$46,060,000
Designated County Entity	Santa Clara Valley Transportation Authority	25.1%	$245,980,000

Without the measure, numerous Bay Area transit agencies have indicated substantial cuts, including BART. The proposed cuts to BART include two phases, one in January 2027 that would close the San Bruno, South San Francisco, Orinda, North Concord/Martinez, Pittsburg Center, Castro Valley, West Dublin/Pleasanton, South Hayward, and Warm Springs/South Fremont stations, as well as stopping all service on the Coliseum-Oakland International Airport connector line. An additional Phase 2 planned for July 2027 would close the Millbrae, Colma, Pittsburg/Bay Point, Antioch, and Dublin/Pleasanton stations. The plan also calls for BART to stop service at 9 pm and reduce frequency of trains to 30 minutes.

Caltrain suggested that without this funding, it would need to close more than one-third of stations, eliminate weekend service, and reduce frequency of trains. AC Transit's contingency plan calls for removing 100 buses from service, less frequent service, no weekend transbay routes, and shorter service hours. SFMTA — which has an additional local ballot measure before San Francisco voters to support its funding — plans to cut up to 20 bus lines, suspend cable cars, and end service early.

An analysis by local think tank SPUR found that the impact of these transit closures would double rush-hour delays on the Bay Bridge and increase gridlock in key traffic choke points.

== Support and criticism ==
The original state senate bill garnered support from transit advocates and local officials. The urbanist think-tank SPUR backed the bill on the grounds that "the need for new funding is dire" and the bill is "practical and politically realistic". MTC Chair and Pleasant Hill Mayor Sue Noack testified in Sacramento in support of the measure to prevent major service cuts. In July, San Francisco's 11 city supervisors voted to reaffirm their support. Caltrain said without the funding the impacts could include closing 1/3 of stations, no weekend service, only running once an hour, stopping at 9pm, and cutting service area.

In June, before the state legislature signed bill, Bay Area Forward, an advocacy group of transit operators and unions, argued for switching to a gross receipts tax to shift the financial burden from individuals to businesses, a change that was opposed by the business association Bay Area Council.

Opponents of the measure argue that the transit agencies have a history of fiscal mismanagement, and that they should reduce administrative overhead, operational inefficiencies, and other unnecessary costs before getting any new public tax dollars.

== Endorsements ==
Yes

U.S. representatives

- John Garamendi, CA-08 (2009–present) (Democratic)
- Ro Khanna, CA-17 (2017–present) (Democratic)
- Sam Liccardo, CA-16 (2025–present) (Democratic)
- Kevin Mullin, CA-15 (2023–present) (Democratic)
- Nancy Pelosi, former Speaker of the House (2007–2011; 2019–2023) from CA-11 (1987–present) (Democratic)
- Lateefah Simon, CA-12 (2025–present) (Democratic)

Statewide officials

- Sally Lieber, member of the California State Board of Equalization from the 2nd district (2023–present) (Democratic)

State legislators

- Patrick Ahrens, AD-26 (2024–present) (Democratic)
- Jesse Arreguín, SD-07 (2024–present) (Democratic)
- Josh Becker, SD-13 (2020–present) (Democratic)
- Marc Berman, AD-23 (2016–present) (Democratic)
- Tim Grayson, SD-09 (2024–present) (Democratic)
- Matt Haney, AD-17 (2022–present) (Democratic)
- Ash Kalra, AD-25 (2016–present) (Democratic)
- Liz Ortega, AD-20 (2022–present) (Democratic)
- Catherine Stefani, AD-19 (2024–present) (Democratic)
- Buffy Wicks, AD-14 (2018–present) (Democratic)
- Scott Wiener, SD-11 (2016–present) (Democratic)

Local officials

- Adena Ishii, mayor of Berkeley (2024–present) (Democratic)
- Barbara Lee, mayor of Oakland (2025–present) (Democratic)
- Daniel Lurie, mayor of San Francisco (2025–present) (Democratic)

Individuals

- Chris Larsen, businessman

Labor unions

- AFSCME 3299
- Alameda County Labor Council AFL-CIO
- IFPTE Local 21
- IBEW Local 6
- National Union of Healthcare Workers
- San Francisco Labor Council
- SEIU Local 1021
- SEIU-USWW
- SMART Local 104
- Teamsters Joint Council 7
- Transport Workers Union of America
- UAW Region 6

Organizations

- 350 Bay Area Action
- AARP California
- Abundance Network
- Abundant SF
- Alice B. Toklas LGBTQ Democratic Club
- Asian Pacific Environmental Network Action
- Bay Area Council
- California Democratic Socialists of America
- California Institute of Integral Studies
- Chinese for Affirmative Action
- Chinese Progressive Association
- East Bay Young Democrats
- GrowSF
- Harvey Milk LGBTQ Democratic Club
- Indivisible SF
- NRDC Action Fund
- Salesforce
- San Francisco Bicycle Coalition
- San Francisco Chamber of Commerce
- San Francisco Foundation
- San Francisco League of Pissed Off Voters
- San Francisco Rising Action Fund
- San Francisco Tenants Union
- San Francisco Transit Riders
- San Francisco Women's Political Committee
- Seamless Bay Area
- sf.citi
- SF YIMBY
- Sierra Club
- Silicon Valley Young Democrats
- SPUR
- TransForm
- United Way Bay Area
- YIMBY Action

Political parties

- Alameda County Democratic Party
- California Working Families Party
- Contra Costa County Democratic Party
- San Francisco Democratic Party

Newspapers and media

- Bay Area Reporter
- Pirate Wires
- San Francisco Bay Guardian
- San Francisco Chronicle
- San Mateo Daily Journal
- Streetsblog California

Government bodies

- Santa Clara County Board of Supervisors
No

State legislators

- Steve Glazer, SD-07 (2015–2024) (Democratic)
- Quentin L. Kopp, SD-08 (1986–1998) (Independent)

Organizations

- Contra Costa Taxpayers Association
- Howard Jarvis Taxpayers Association
- San Francisco Taxpayers Association
- Silicon Valley Taxpayers Association

Political parties

- San Francisco Republican Party

Newspapers

- East Bay Times
- Palo Alto Daily Post
- The Mercury News

== Results ==
The measure won handily, with voters in all five counties backing the tax increase. In addition to the RTM, voters in San Francisco also passed a separate, but connected Proposition H aimed at funding the Muni. Similarly, the county recorded the strongest support for the RTM, at 77.6% of the vote. Conversely, "No" performed the best in Santa Clara, with support for the RTM held to 54.2%.

Regional Transit Measure results (excluding invalid votes)
Yes; 805,292 (62.2%)	No; 488,480 (37.8%)
▲50%

=== Results by county ===
County	Yes, #	Yes, %	No, #	No, %	
County	Alameda	193,325	65.2%	103,295	34.8%
Contra Costa	146,383	56.0%	114,875	44.0%	
San Francisco	188,528	78.6%	51,467	21.4%	
San Mateo	92,549	59.9%	61,939	40.1%	
Santa Clara	184,507	54.0%	156,904	46.0%	
