= 1996 California Proposition 209 =

Referendum banning affirmative action

Proposition 209
- November 5, 1996
- Prohibition Against Discrimination or Preferential Treatment by State and other Public Entities. Initiative Constitutional Amendment.

Results
Choice	Votes	%
Yes	5,268,462	54.55%
No	4,388,733	45.45%
Valid votes	9,657,195	94.09%
Invalid or blank votes	606,295	5.91%
Total votes	10,263,490	100.00%
Registered voters/turnout	15,562,075	65.95%
County results
Yes
70–80%
60–70%
50–60%
No
70–80%
60–70%
50–60%

Proposition 209 (also known as the California Civil Rights Initiative or CCRI) is a California ballot proposition which, upon approval in November 1996, amended the state constitution to prohibit state governmental institutions from considering race, sex, or ethnicity, specifically in the areas of public employment, public contracting, and public education. Modeled on the Civil Rights Act of 1964, the California Civil Rights Initiative was authored by two California academics, Glynn Custred and Tom Wood. It was the first electoral test of affirmative action policies in North America. It passed with 55% in favor to 45% opposed, thereby banning affirmative action in the state's public sector.

== History ==
=== Context ===
The controversy pertaining to affirmative action in California can most notably be traced back to the historic 1978 Supreme Court case Regents of the University of California v. Bakke. The Court held the quota system that the University of California, Davis' admission process once used for minority students was unlawful, but simultaneously held that higher-level academic institutions were not entirely prohibited from considering race in the admissions process. This remained true until the Supreme Court's ruling in Students for Fair Admissions v. Harvard (2023). The Bakke ruling acted as "a catalyst for voluntary affirmative action programs." Researchers suggest that the development of such programs for the sake of increasing campus diversity explains the controversy surrounding the implementation of Proposition 209 and Bakke marks the origination of affirmative action debates.

=== Origins ===
The political campaign to place the language of CCRI on the California ballot as a constitutional amendment was initiated by Joe Gelman (president of the Board of Civil Service Commissioners of the City of Los Angeles), Arnold Steinberg (a pollster and political strategist) and Larry Arnn (president of the Claremont Institute). It was later endorsed by Governor Pete Wilson and supported and funded by the California Civil Rights Initiative Campaign, led by University of California Regent Ward Connerly, a Wilson ally. A key co-chair of the campaign was law professor Gail Heriot, who served as a member of the United States Commission on Civil Rights. The initiative was opposed by affirmative action advocates and traditional civil rights and feminist organizations on the left side of the political spectrum. Proposition 209 was voted into law on November 5, 1996, with 55 percent of the vote, and has withstood legal scrutiny ever since.

=== National impact ===
In November 2006, a similar amendment modeled on California's Proposition 209 was passed in Michigan, titled the Michigan Civil Rights Initiative. The constitutionality of the Michigan Civil Rights Initiative was challenged in the 6th Circuit Court of Appeals. The case, Schuette v. Coalition to Defend Affirmative Action, made its way to the United States Supreme Court. On April 22, 2014, the US Supreme Court ruled 6-2 that the Michigan Civil Rights Initiative is constitutional, and that states had the right to ban the practice of racial and gender preferences/affirmative action if they chose to do so through the electoral process.

== Text ==
The text of Proposition 209 was drafted by Cal State anthropology professor Glynn Custred and California Association of Scholars Executive Director Thomas Wood. Its passage amended the California constitution to include a new section (Section 31 of Article I), which now reads:

(a) The state shall not discriminate against, or grant preferential treatment to, any individual or group on the basis of race, sex, color, ethnicity, or national origin in the operation of public employment, public education, or public contracting.

(b) This section shall apply only to action taken after the section's effective date.

(c) Nothing in this section shall be interpreted as prohibiting bona fide qualifications based on sex which are reasonably necessary to the normal operation of public employment, public education, or public contracting.

(d) Nothing in this section shall be interpreted as invalidating any court order or consent decree which is in force as of the effective date of this section.

(e) Nothing in this section shall be interpreted as prohibiting action which must be taken to establish or maintain eligibility for any federal program, where ineligibility would result in a loss of federal funds to the state.

(f) For the purposes of this section, "state" shall include, but not necessarily be limited to, the state itself, any city, county, city and county, public university system, including the University of California, community college district, school district, special district, or any other political subdivision or governmental instrumentality of or within the state.

(g) The remedies available for violations of this section shall be the same, regardless of the injured party's race, sex, color, ethnicity, or national origin, as are otherwise available for violations of then-existing California antidiscrimination law.

(h) This section shall be self-executing. If any part or parts of this section are found to be in conflict with federal law or the United States Constitution, the section shall be implemented to the maximum extent that federal law and the United States Constitution permit. Any provision held invalid shall be severable from the remaining portions of this section.

== Failed attempts to repeal ==
=== Senate Bill 185 ===
On September 1, 2011, SB 185 passed both chambers of the California State Legislature, but was vetoed by Governor Jerry Brown. SB 185 would have countered Proposition 209 and authorized the University of California and the California State University to consider race, gender, ethnicity, and national origin, along with other relevant factors, in undergraduate and graduate admissions, to the maximum extent permitted by the 14th Amendment to the United States Constitution, Section 31 of Article I of the California Constitution, and relevant case law. SB 185 was strongly supported by the University of California Students Association.

=== Senate Constitutional Amendment No. 5 ===
On December 3, 2012, California State Senator Edward Hernandez introduced California Senate Constitutional Amendment No.5 (SCA-5) in the State Senate. This initiative proposed an amendment to the state constitution to remove provisions of California Proposition 209 related to public post-secondary education, to permit state universities to consider applicants' race, gender, color, ethnicity, or national origin in admission decisions. If passed by both the State Senate and State Assembly, SCA-5 would have been presented to California voters in the November 2014 election. SCA-5 was passed by the California State Senate on January 30, 2014. On February 24, 2014, Gene D. Block, chancellor of UCLA, sent an open letter to all students and faculty expressing his strong opposition to Proposition 209. Following resistance from various citizen groups, including Asian American groups, Senator Hernandez withdrew his measure from consideration.

=== Proposition 16 ===
On January 18, 2019, Assemblymembers Shirley Weber, Mike Gipson, and Miguel Santiago introduced Assembly Constitutional Amendment No. 5 (ACA 5). ACA 5 was a proposed constitutional amendment that would have repealed the provisions enacted by Proposition 209. In June 2020, the California State Legislature passed ACA 5 with more than a two-thirds vote in each house, allowing the proposal to become a qualified ballot measure and later Proposition 16. Proposition 16 was rejected by 57.23% of voters in the November 2020 election, meaning that Prop 209 remains in the California Constitution.

=== Assembly Constitutional Amendment No. 7 ===
In 2023, Assemblymember Corey Jackson introduced Assembly Constitutional Amendment No. 7 (ACA 7). The amendment's author decided to let the proposal die, in part due to the fear that "... voters wouldn't pass the measure..."

== Support ==
Supporters of Proposition 209 contended that existing affirmative action programs led public employers and universities to reject applicants based on their race, and that Proposition 209 would "restore and reconfirm the historic intention of the 1964 Civil Rights Act." The basic and simple premise of Proposition 209 is that every individual has a right, and that right is not to be discriminated against, or granted a preference, based on their race or gender. Since the number of available positions are limited, discriminating against or giving unearned preference to a person based solely, or even partially on race or gender deprives qualified applicants of all races an equal opportunity to succeed. It also pits one group against another and perpetuates social tension.

Individuals in support

- Ward Connerly
- Bob Dole, 1996 presidential candidate
- Dan Lungren, California Attorney General
- Pete Wilson, Governor of California
- Gail Heriot
- Eugene Volokh
- Darrell Issa
- Roger Hedgecock
- Lance Izumi
- Sally Pipes

Organizations in support

- American Civil Rights Institute
- California Republican Party
- Center for Equal Opportunity
- Pacific Legal Foundation (PLF)

== Opposition ==
Opponents of Proposition 209 argued that it would end affirmative action practices of tutoring, mentoring, outreach and recruitment of women and minorities in California universities and businesses and would gut state and local protections against discrimination. After passage of Proposition 209, some students protested at universities including UC Berkeley, UCLA, UC Santa Cruz, and San Francisco State University.

Individuals in opposition

- Barbara Boxer, U.S. Senator
- Ellen DeGeneres, talk show host
- Dianne Feinstein, U.S. Senator
- Dolores Huerta, civil rights activist
- Rev. Jesse Jackson, civil rights activist
- Coretta Scott King, wife of the late Dr. Martin Luther King Jr.
- William Levada, Archbishop of San Francisco
- Roger Mahony, cardinal and Archbishop of Los Angeles
- Rosa Parks, civil rights leader
- Colin Powell, then-retired U.S. general
- Bruce Springsteen, musician
- Chang-Lin Tien, UC Berkeley Chancellor
- Charles E. Young, UCLA Chancellor

Organizations in opposition

- AARP of California
- ACLU
- American Jewish Congress
- Asian Law Caucus
- By Any Means Necessary (BAMN)
- California American Association of University Women
- California Labor Council, AFL-CIO
- California Teachers Association
- Chinese for Affirmative Action
- Feminist Majority
- Mexican American Legal Defense and Education Fund (MALDEF)
- Leadership Conference on Civil Rights
- League of Women Voters of California
- National Association for the Advancement of Colored People (NAACP)
- National Lawyers Guild
- National Organization for Women (NOW)
- Pacific Gas and Electric
- Southern Christian Leadership Conference
- University of California Student Association (UCSA)
- United Farm Workers
- YWCA USA

== Results ==

Proposition 209
Choice	Votes	%
For	5,268,462	54.55
Against	4,388,733	45.45
Total	9,657,195	100.00
Valid votes	9,657,195	94.11
Invalid/blank votes	604,444	5.89
Total votes	10,261,639	100.00
Registered voters/turnout	15,662,075	65.52
Source: November 5, 1996, Complete General Election Statement of Vote

=== Voter demographics ===
On November 5, 1996, the Los Angeles Times conducted an exit poll of 2,473 voters who cast ballots in the general election at 40 polling places. The margin of error was 3 percent (higher for subgroups). The following is the exit poll data on Proposition 209:

Los Angeles Times Exit Poll
Demographic subgroup	Support	Oppose	% of total vote
All Voters	54%	46%	100%
Ideology
Liberal	27%	73%	21%
Moderate	52%	48%	47%
Conservative	77%	23%	32%
Party
Democratic	31%	69%	21%
Republican	80%	20%	38%
Independent	59%	41%	14%
Gender
Male	61%	39%	47%
Female	48%	52%	53%
Race
White	63%	37%	74%
Black	26%	74%	7%
Latino	24%	76%	10%
Asian	39%	61%	5%
Age
18–29	50%	50%	19%
30–44	51%	49%	35%
45–64	58%	42%	35%
65+	60%	40%	11%
Family income
Less than $20,000	41%	59%	12%
$20,000 to $39,999	48%	52%	24%
$40,000 to $59,999	56%	44%	23%
$60,000 to $74,999	65%	35%	15%
$75,000+	59%	41%	26%
Education
High School or Less	54%	46%	20%
Some College	60%	40%	29%
College or More	54%	46%	27%
Post-Graduate	48%	52%	24%
Religion
Protestant	62%	38%	49%
Catholic	54%	46%	24%
Jewish	42%	58%	6%

== Aftermath ==
=== Legal challenges ===
Proposition 209 has been the subject of many lawsuits in state courts since its passage but has withstood legal scrutiny over the years. On November 27, 1996, U.S. District Court Judge Thelton Henderson blocked enforcement of the proposition. A three-judge panel of the 9th Circuit Court of Appeals subsequently overturned that ruling.

On August 2, 2010, in a case brought before the Supreme Court of California by the Pacific Legal Foundation (PLF) found for the second time that Proposition 209 was constitutional. The ruling, by a 6–1 majority, followed a unanimous affirmation in 2000 of the constitutionality of Prop. 209 by the same court.

On April 2, 2012, the 9th U.S. Circuit Court of Appeals rejected the latest challenge to Proposition 209. The three-judge panel concluded that it was bound by a 9th Circuit ruling in 1997 upholding the constitutionality of the affirmative action ban. Ninth Circuit Judge A. Wallace Tashima disagreed in part with the ruling, saying he believes the court "wrongly decided" the issue in 1997.

=== Effect on enrollment, graduation, and income ===
According to UC Office of the President, "Proposition 209 instigated a dramatic change in UC admissions policy, with URG [under represented group] enrollment at the Berkeley and UCLA campuses immediately falling by more than 60 percent and systemwide URG enrollment falling by at least 12 percent." The same report concluded that "Prop 209 led URG applicants to cascade out of UC into measurably less-advantageous universities, which combined with declines in degree attainment and STEM persistence to lower each URG applicant's wages by about 5 percent between ages 23 and 35." Another study found that while enrollment of minority students dropped immediately in the wake of Prop 209, the grades and academic achievements of the students in the system rose significantly.

Based on "University of California Applicants, Admits and New Enrollees by Campus, Race/Ethnicity", prepared by Institutional Research, the University of California Office of the President, August 11, 2011, enrollment percentages of the four major ethnic groups university-wide are:

Ethnic group enrollment percentages in first-year enrollment of University of California (%)
Ethnic group	African American	Asian	Latino	White (Non-Hispanic)
1999	2.7	29.4	10.8	41.2
2000	2.8	29.1	11.2	39.8
2001	2.7	29.5	11.8	38.7
2002	2.9	30.4	12.1	38.3
2003	2.9	29.8	12.7	37.5
2004	2.8	30.8	12.7	36.9
2005	2.8	32.1	13.0	37.0
2006	3.0	32.6	13.6	35.9
2007	3.3	32.2	14.2	35.0
2008	3.4	31.6	15.4	34.0
2009	3.3	31.6	15.9	33.7
2010	3.5	32.4	17.1	31.4
2011	3.5	32.0	18.6	30.8
2012	3.7	31.7	18.7	28.0
2013	3.6	30.1	19.3	27.9
2014	3.7	29.7	19.9	26.4
2015	3.6	28.9	19.5	25.4
2016	4.1	28.5	21.7	24.4
2017	4.1	28.5	21.6	24.2
2018	4.2	29.2	21.4	23.0
2019	4.2	29.6	21.8	23.1
2020	4.5	31.7	22.5	22.9
2021	4.7	30.2	22.8	22.3
2022	4.7	32.6	23.2	21.1
2023	4.8	32.5	24.3	20.6
2024	4.8	32.4	24.0	20.2

African American enrollment rates dropped significantly immediately after the passage of Prop 209. Criticism was raised that of the 4,422 students in UCLA's freshman class of 2006, only 96 (2.26%) were African American. Despite this, African American enrollment has rebounded and even exceeded its pre-Prop 209 percentages.

The percentage of Latino students admitted to the UC system as of 2007 exceeded the Proposition 209 level, though this is also correlated with an increase in the Latino population in the state of California.

Researchers also found that enrollment statistics for Native American students beginning in 1997 through 2006 declined by 38% cumulatively and, unlike other ethnic groups, have not increased since.

A comprehensive, peer-reviewed study by Zachary Bleemer found that Prop 209 has had a negative impact on graduation rates, graduate school attendance, and income for black and Hispanic students.

In 2021, the University of California freshmen class reached an all-time high with 84,223 students. Latinos were the largest group at 37%, followed by Asian Americans at 34%; Non-Hispanic White students at 20%; African Americans at 5%; and 4% were composed of members of other groups, including American Indians, Pacific Islanders or those who declined to state their race or ethnicity.

=== Private sector response ===
One response to Proposition 209 was the establishment of the IDEAL Scholars Fund to provide community and financial support for underrepresented students at the University of California, Berkeley. Private universities and colleges, as well as employers, are not subject to Proposition 209 unless they receive public contracts.

== See also ==
- 2020 California Proposition 16
- Students for Fair Admissions v. Harvard
- Regents of the University of California v. Bakke (1978)
- Grutter v. Bollinger (2003)
- Gratz v. Bollinger (2003)

== Scholarship and commentary ==
- Heriot, Gail (2001). "University of California admissions under Proposition 209: Unheralded gains face an uncertain future". NEXUS: A Journal of Opinion. 6: 163ff.
- Jamison, Cynthia Cook (2004). "The cost of defiance: Plaintiffs' entitlement to damages under the California Civil Rights Initiative". Southwestern Univ. Law Review. 33: 521ff. SSRN 699641.
- McCutcheon, Stephen R. Jr.; Lindsey, Travis J. (2004). "The last refuge of official discrimination: The federal funding exception to California's Proposition 209". Santa Clara Law Review. 44: 457–495. SSRN 643965.
- Myers, Caitlin Knowles (2007). "A cure for discrimination? Affirmative action and the case of California's Proposition 209". Industrial & Labor Relations Review. 60 (3): 379–396. doi:10.1177/001979390706000304. ISSN 0019-7939. Originally published as Myers, Caitlin Knowles (2005), A cure for discrimination? Affirmative action and the case of California Proposition 209 (PDF), IZA Discussion Papers, vol. 1674, Bonn: Institute for the Study of Labor (IZA), hdl:10419/33452
