= Daniel Newman =

Daniel Newman may refer to:

- Dan Newman (born 1963), Canadian politician
- Dan Newman (political consultant), American political consultant
- Dan Newman (ice hockey) (born 1952), Canadian ice hockey player
- Daniel Newman (American actor) (born 1981), American actor, model and musician
- Daniel Newman (British actor) (born 1976), British actor
- Daniel Newman (academic) (born 1963), British writer, scholar and translator of Arabic literature
- Daniel Newman (politician), New Zealand politician on Auckland Council
- Daniel F. Newman (1935–2009), American politician in New Jersey
- Daniel J. Newman, American politician
