= Senate Constitutional Amendment 5 =

Proposed California ballot measure

Senate Constitutional Amendment 5 (SCA 5) was introduced by California State Senator Edward Hernandez to the California State Senate on December 3, 2012. This initiative would ask voters to consider eliminating California Proposition 209's ban on the use of race, sex, color, ethnicity, or national origin in recruitment, admissions, and retention programs at California's public universities and colleges. SCA 5 was passed in the California Senate on January 30, 2014 but was subsequently withdrawn by Hernandez due to strong opposition, mainly from Asian Americans.

== Background and Content of SCA 5 ==
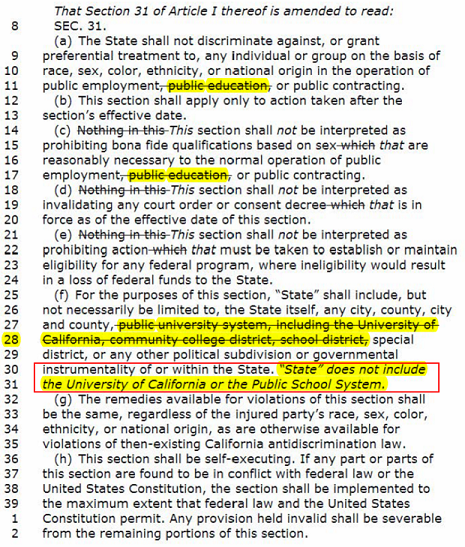
California Constitution Amendment 5 key changes

In 1996, California became the first state to outlaw affirmative action in public universities and state hiring. Proposition 209 prohibited state government institutions from considering race, sex, or ethnicity, specifically in the areas of public employment, public contracting, and public education.

Hernandez introduced Senate Bill 185 in 2011, which sought to achieve what SCA 5 intended and was vetoed by Governor Jerry Brown.

SCA 5 essentially does the following two things:

- Deletes the specific provisions implemented through the enactment of Proposition 209 that prohibit the State from discriminating against, or granting preferential treatment to individuals or groups on the basis of race, sex, ethnicity, or national origin, in the operation of public education.
- Deletes the UC and the public school system from the definition of the "state" under Section 31 of Article 1, thereby repealing the application of the provisions of Proposition 209 to those entities.

== Support ==
The lead author of the bill, Senator Hernandez, argued that due to Proposition 209, "there has been a precipitous drop in the percentage of Latino, African American, and Native American students at California public universities, despite the fact that those same groups have seen steady increases in their percentages of college-eligible high school graduates."

The same arguments for support were summarized as follows in the bill analysis:

"According to the author's office, immediately following the November 1996 passage of Proposition 209, there was a significant drop in the percentage of enrolled minority students at both the UC and the CSU. The author's office is concerned that, in spite of new eligibility requirements and admissions initiative which have helped to restore the numbers of some underrepresented students, the proportion of underrepresented students eligible for UC and CSU has not kept pace with the proportion of the high school graduating class that they now represent."

On February 24, 2014, Gene D. Block, Chancellor of UCLA, sent an open letter to all students and faculties expressing his strong opposition to Proposition 209.

The following Asian American organizations supported SCA 5:

- Asian Americans Advancing Justice | Asian Law Caucus
- UC Asian American & Pacific Islander Policy Multicampus Research Program (AAPI Policy MRP)
- National Commission on Asian American and Pacific Islander Research in Education (CARE)
- Chinese for Affirmative Action
- The Civil Rights Project
- Asian Pacific Americans for Higher Education (APAHE)
- Southeast Asia Resource Center (SEARAC)
- Hmong Innovating Politics (HIP)

The following organizations support SCA 5, according to the Legislature's record.

- AFSCME
- American Association of University Women
- Association of California Healthcare Districts
- Bassett Teachers Association
- California Academy of Physician Assistants
- California Association for Nurse Practitioners
- California Black Chamber of Commerce
- California Black Health Network
- California Communities United Institute
- California Hospital Association
- California Medical Association
- California Nurses Association
- California Pan-Ethnic Health Network
- California Pharmacists Association
- California Primary Care Association
- California State Student Association
- California Teachers Association
- Equal Justice Society
- Equality California
- Health Access California
- Hispanic Association of Colleges and Universities
- Lawyers' Committee for Civil Rights of the San Francisco Bay Area
- Medical Oncology Association of Southern California, Inc.
- People Improving Communities through Organizing
- Public Advocates
- The Greenlining Institute
- University of California Student Association
- Western Center on Law and Poverty

== Opposition ==
California State Senate Minority Leader Bob Huff voiced opposition to SCA 5 in the State Senate. Democrats Leland Yee, Ted Lieu, and Carol Liu were among those who voted for SCA 5 in the Senate, but the three senators have since asked Hernandez to hold the bill from an Assembly vote in order to better assess its potential impacts, in light of fervent opposition among the public. In addition, Assemblyman Ed Chau has promised that he will vote against SCA 5 if it is voted on in the State Assembly.

Opposing organization in the Legislature's record:

- American Civil Rights Coalition

Other organizations and individuals opposing SCA 5 included:

- American Civil Rights Institute and Ward Connerly
- Project on Fair Representation
- The Century Foundation
- The Center for Individual Rights
- Chinese American Federation (Representing about 100 Chinese American organizations)
- 80-20 National Asian American PAC
- The Committee of 100
- Asian Americans for Political Advancement PAC
- Backbone Foundation
- Chinese Alliance for Equality
- Chinese Americans for Progress and Equality
- Chinese United
- Chinese Young Professionals Networking
- Chinese-American Institute for Empowerment
- DFW Chinese Alliance
- On Leon Merchants Association of Miami
- Overseas Chinese Association of Miami
- Silicon Valley Chinese Association
- The Chinese Association of Science, Education and Culture of South Florida
- The Federation of Florida Chinese Associations
- The Great Philadelphia United Chinese American Chamber of Commerce
- The United Association of Chinese Alumni in Great Houston
- United Asian Americans for Activism
- United Chinese Associations of Eastern USA
- United Chinese Foundation
- The World Association of Chinese Elites
- Chinese-American Oceanic and Atmospheric Association
- 80-20 Asian American PAC Virginia-Maryland-DC Chapter
- USCCA (Univ. of Southern California, California Alumni Association)
- San Diego Asian American for Equality
- Indian American Forum for Political Education
- Chinese Americans for Progress & Equality
- Asian American Voters
- Joint Chinese University Alumni Association
- The Orange Club
- Central California Chinese Cultural Association (CCCCA)

=== Arguments ===
Major arguments against SCA 5 include:

Failing to address root causes of the problem

- To address the problem of failing to obtain college admission, the root causes in early stage should be identified and the quality and outreach of K-12 education should be improved. Artificially lowering the admission standard for a small group of students will not address the root problems. On the other hand, college enrollment should be increased to accommodate qualified students.

Pursuing the wrong metrics for diversity

- Diversity is defined by the collection of different life experiences, thinking models, approaches to problems, and fresh perspectives within a group of people, not defined by the superficial differences in skin colors. Improving education diversity is to improve different thinking methods and problem solving skills for students so they can be better prepared for life challenges later on, not to increase the number of different skin colors.

Wrongfully blaming Proposition 209

- The UC system already leads the country in its admission of talented, socioeconomically disadvantaged students. In 2011–12, 41 percent of the enrolled students at UC and CSU were Pell Grant recipient students (i.e. most often undergraduates with family incomes under $20,000).
- Graduation rates for all races and ethnicities increased by using race and gender neutral policies.

Relying on shaky fundamental supportive data

- Hernandez did not provide publicly accessible sources of the data used to support his statement of the problem. His data is also selectively based on a few campuses (such as UCLA and UC Berkeley) of the UC system or a few isolated years after 1996 (2004 was singled out for example).
- Based on publicly accessible data, it is indisputable that both in absolute numbers and percentages, minorities that attend the University of California have increased. Comparing the data in 1996 and 2013: Black students' population increased from 4% to 4.3% out of 6.6% of the California population, Chicanos and Latinos increased from 14.3% to 27.8% out of 38.2% population, Asian increased from 32% to 35.9% out of 13.9% population. The only race group with decreased student population is whites (decreased from 41% to 27.9%, out of 39.4% population).

Ineffective and harmful policies

- Preferential treatments for certain racial groups in college admission will inevitably deny other racial groups' access to the same education system, creating or sustaining an Asian quota, for example. This may increase the risk of racial tensions or even hostilities in California.
- Race-based preferential treatments in college admission do not work based on latest research.

== Legislative action ==
SCA 5 passed the State Senate on January 30, 2014, and crossed over to the Assembly. On March 17, 2014, at Hernandez's request, Assembly Speaker John Pérez referred the measure back to the Senate. In a joint statement with Hernandez, Pérez announced the creation of a bicameral commission on issues surrounding recruitment, admissions, and retention in California's systems of higher education. Senate President pro Tempore Darrell Steinberg also issued a statement stating that he is a supporter of SCA 5: "I look forward to working with Senator Hernandez, my Senate colleagues, and the Assembly in bringing all communities together for a serious and sober examination of affirmative action."

=== Voting in the Senate ===
On January 30, 2014, the bill passed in the Senator in a party-line vote, with 27 ayes, 9 noes, 3 NVR (no votes recorded)

- Ayes: Beall(D), Block(D), Calderon(D), Corbett(D), Correa(D), De León(D), DeSaulnier(D), Evans(D), Galgiani(D), Hancock(D), Hernandez(D), Hill(D), Hueso(D), Jackson(D), Lara(D), Leno(D), Lieu(D), Liu(D), Mitchell(D), Monning(D), Padilla(D), Pavley(D), Roth(D), Steinberg(D), Torres(D), Wolk(D), Yee(D)
- Noes: Anderson(R), Berryhill(R), Fuller(R), Gaines(R), Huff(R), Knight(R), Vidak(R), Walters(R), Wyland(R)
- NVR: Cannella(R), Nielsen(R), Wright(D)

== Public reactions ==
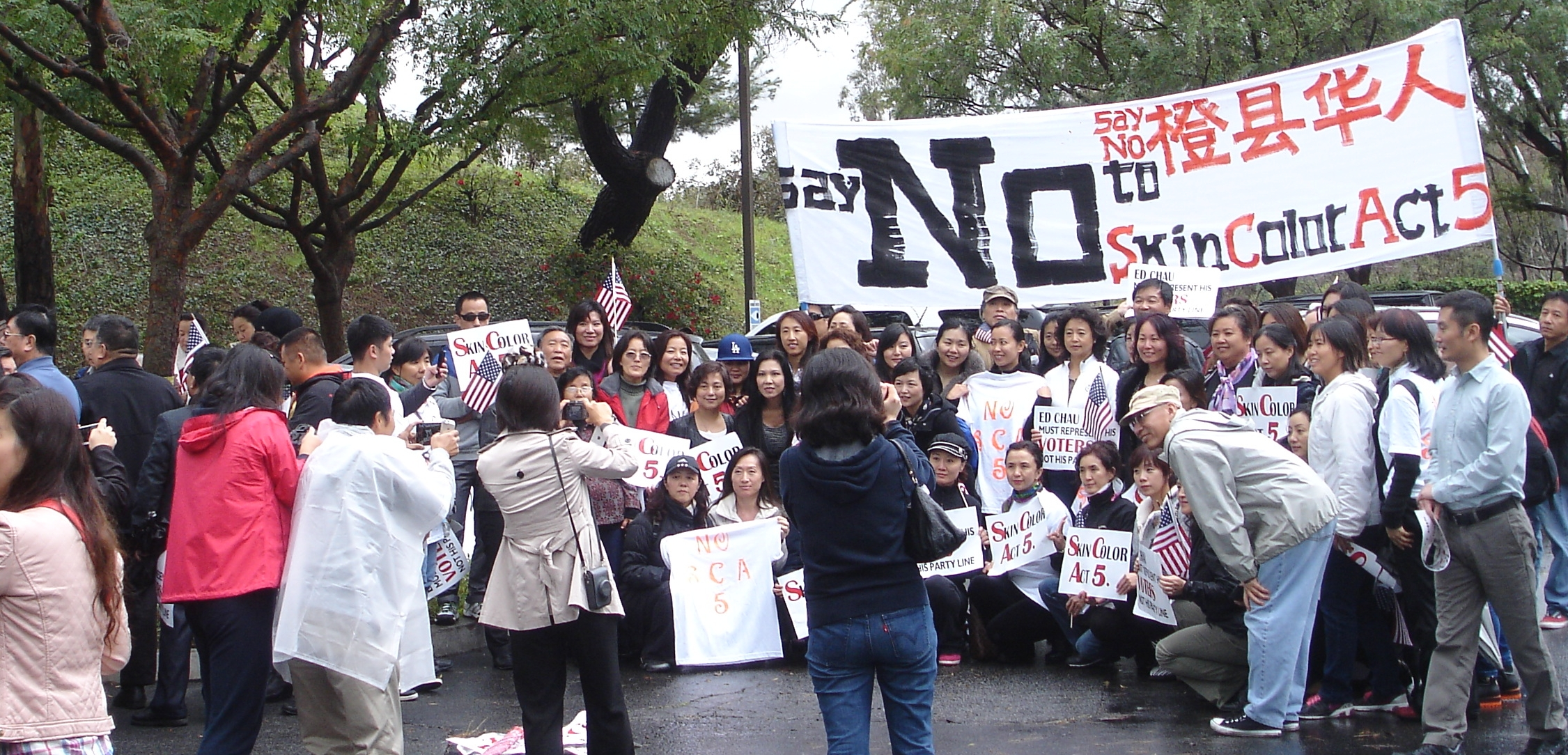
Chinese Americans protesting against SCA 5 outside Assemblyman Ed Chau's office in Monterey Park

SCA 5 received heightened public attention after it passed the State Senate. A Change.org petition has been launched to press the State Assembly to vote No on SCA 5. The petition gained over 80,000 supporters in less than two weeks.

Resistance to the bill included a petition to stop the bill that received more than 112,000 signatures. Many different Asian lobbying groups also attacked the bill, including the Southeast Asian Resource and Action Center and the Filipino Advocates for Justice in Union City and Oakland.

Republicans also attacked the bill and went against the Democrats, who had a supermajority in the Senate. Republicans spoke at a forum called "Stop SCA 5," which was sponsored by the Chinese-American Institute for Empowerment, which is based in San Francisco.

The bill stagnated while under intense opposition until Senator Edward Hernandez took it off the table. The bill did not qualify to be put on the election ballot as a referendum.

== Aftermath ==
A Change.org petition to stop the bill had more than 112,000 signatures at that time, and at the request of three Democratic senators who voted for the bill in January, Senator Hernandez put the bill on hold. There has been no further action or attempt to revive the bill.

Assembly Bill 1726, which was seen by some as a prelude to a revival of SCA 5, was signed into law in late 2016.

Another piece of legislation, Assembly Constitutional Amendment 5 (ACA 5), was introduced by Assembly Members Weber, Gipson, and Santiago on January 18, 2019. ACA 5 was a resolution to propose to California voters an amendment to repeal Proposition 209. ACA 5 eventually became Proposition 16 and failed in the 2020 election.

== See also ==
- California Affirmative Action in Education Amendment (2014)
