= California Proposition 39 =

California Proposition 39 may refer to the following ballot measures:

- 2000 California Proposition 39, enacted by California voters to change the required supermajority vote necessary for voters to approve local school bonds.
- 2012 California Proposition 39, enacted by California voters to change the way out-of-state corporations calculate their income tax burdens.
- 2026 California Proposition 39, a proposal requiring voters to show a government ID at polling places.

== See also ==
- California ballot proposition, a referendum or initiative submitted to the California electorate for a vote
- List of California ballot propositions
