= 2026 San Francisco Measure H =

- November 3, 2026
- Parcel Tax to Fund Public Muni Operations

Results
Choice	Votes	%
Yes	231,481	74.07%
No	81,046	25.93%
Valid votes	312,527	100.00%
Invalid or blank votes	0	0.00%
Total votes	312,527	100.00%
Registered voters/turnout	535,608	58.35%
- Yes 80–90% 70–80% 60–70% 50–60%

Measure H, also referred to as Proposition H or the Muni parcel tax was an initiative that appeared on the November 3, 2026 ballot in San Francisco, California. It aimed to establish an annual parcel tax to support Muni services., seeking to generate some $177 million a year for the system's transit operations and administration.

The initiative was put forward alongside the larger, five-county-wide Regional Transit Measure; both proposals passed. Measure H was backed by 73.6% of the voters, with a slightly lower performance than the RTM, which recorded 78.6% of the vote in San Francisco.

== Provisions ==
The measure authorizes an annual parcel tax aimed at providing funds to Muni. The tax is proposed to be levied for 15 years, from July 2027 through June 2042, with costs dependent on square footage. The yearly tax burden is expected to range from $179 for a majority of single-family houses to $400,000 for the largest commercial properties. Overall, the funds raised by the parcel tax are expected to address about one half of Muni's operating gap.

== Background ==
The Proposition H was put forward as a way to support the transit service in the aftermath of the COVID-19 pandemic, which resulted in steep reduction of Muni ridership. In particular, the tax increase sought to address the SFMTA's projected $350 million budget deficit. Prior to the vote, the agency warned it could be forced to cut as many as 20 bus routes, reduce nighttime service and slash frequency on select routes by half in case both the Proposition H and the RTM failed. Additionally, the SFMTA believed it would have to cut the historic F Market & Wharves line as well as the city's cable cars.

The measure was first discussed in November 2025, with two different taxation systems proposed; proponents, including Mayor Daniel Lurie, started gathering signatures in March 2026. Ran as "Stronger Muni for All", the proposition collected enough signatures to be placed on the ballot by late May. As it was put forward by residents, the initiative would only require a simple majority to pass rather than a two-thirds supermajority.

== Positions ==
Daniel Lurie, the Mayor of San Francisco, supported the initiative, as well as Nancy Pelosi, who has represented in the House of Representatives. (Note: CA-11, which Pelosi has represented since 2023, covers the majority of San Francisco) Additionally, the proposition was supported by the city's Chamber of Commerce and its Labor Council, as well San Francisco Democratic Party. Conversely, its counterpart, the Republican Party, spoke in opposition.

The proposal received contributions from OpenAI, Anthropic, Ripple and Visa, all headquartered in the city, as well as an Airbnb-sponsored committee: each company gave $500,000 in support of the initiative.

== Results ==
The proposition performed strongly, reaching almost three quarters of the vote. It was approved throughout the city, with only a few precincts voting in opposition. It also performed favorably in every neighborhood, scoring as high as 87.7% of the vote in Haight-Ashbury. Conversely, the southern neighborhoods of Visitacion Valley and Portola saw the lowest support at below 60%; similarly, Measure H performed modestly in Seacliff.

Parcel Tax to Fund Public Muni Operations results (excluding invalid votes)
Yes; 231,481 (74.1%)	No; 81,046 (25.9%)
▲50%

=== Results by neighborhood ===
Neighborhood	Yes, #	Yes, %	No, #	No, %	
Neighborhood	Bayview Hunters Point	6468	65.8%	3362	34.2%
Bernal Heights	8664	81.7%	1946	18.3%	
Castro / Upper Market	11004	85.3%	1897	14.7%	
Chinatown	1211	74.9%	405	25.1%	
Excelsior	6135	63.8%	3488	36.2%	
Financial District / South Beach	4908	74.0%	1722	26.0%	
Glen Park	3435	79.9%	863	20.1%	
Haight-Ashbury	7595	87.8%	1059	12.2%	
Hayes Valley	8073	87.3%	1174	12.7%	
Inner Richmond	7359	76.9%	2211	23.1%	
Inner Sunset	10409	76.9%	3131	23.1%	
Japantown	430	81.6%	97	18.4%	
Lakeshore	2088	75.0%	698	25.1%	
Lone Mountain / USF	4396	82.6%	927	17.4%	
Marina	7099	67.8%	3380	32.2%	
McLaren Park	1112	62.2%	675	37.8%	
Mission	16878	85.2%	2933	14.8%	
Mission Bay	3738	76.9%	1124	23.1%	
Nob Hill	6521	80.3%	1603	19.7%	
Noe Valley	9642	80.9%	2274	19.1%	
North Beach	2933	75.4%	957	24.6%	
Oceanview / Merced / Ingleside	4400	62.2%	2675	37.8%	
Outer Mission	4232	64.4%	2340	35.6%	
Outer Richmond	12082	68.9%	5454	31.1%	
Pacific Heights	7951	76.3%	2468	23.7%	
Portola	2201	58.9%	1538	41.1%	
Presidio	1106	85.5%	188	14.5%	
Presidio Heights	4369	73.8%	1552	26.2%	
Russian Hill	5881	77.1%	1749	22.9%	
Seacliff	416	59.5%	283	40.5%	
Sunset / Parkside	18422	60.2%	12189	39.8%	
Tenderloin	4996	82.5%	1056	17.4%	
Treasure Island	361	80.4%	88	19.6%	
Twin Peaks	2841	73.3%	1036	26.7%	
Visitacion Valley	1620	57.6%	1190	42.4%	
West of Twin Peaks	12201	64.5%	6730	35.5%	
Western Addition	5649	82.2%	1226	17.8%	
South of Market	6380	80.1%	1589	19.9%	
Potrero Hill	5279	80.3%	1291	19.6%	
Lincoln Park	996	67.6%	478	32.4%	
