= California Policy Center =

Political social research institute

- Abbreviation: CPC
- Formation: 2010; 16 years ago
- Type: Nonprofit 501(c)(3)
- Location: Tustin, California
- Methods: Public policy research
- President: Will Swaim
- Revenue: $2.29 million (2024)
- Expenses: $2.2 million (2024)
- Website: californiapolicycenter.org

The California Policy Center (CPC) is a conservative and libertarian public policy think tank located in California. Based in Tustin, the organization specializes in union policy, pension reform, spending reform, and school choice. CPC was founded in 2010 by Marc Bucher and Edward Ring. It is a member of the State Policy Network, an association of state-based conservative and libertarian think tanks.

== Policy activities ==
=== Union policy ===
The CPC represented a teacher in a case following the Supreme Court’s decision in Janus, seeking to reject United Teachers Los Angeles status as the sole bargaining agent for California teachers.

CPC has partnered with groups such as Reform California, the Freedom Foundation, the National Right to Work Legal Defense Foundation, and the Mackinac Center for Public Policy in campaigns to reduce the power of California's unions. CPC has also joined with the Center for Individual Rights to challenge a California law forbidding public employers from speech deterring or discouraging union membership in any way.

=== Pension reform ===
CPC says that California's employee pension program places strain on the budgets of the state and of local governments. CPC has also analyzed how the state pension "defined benefit" style system and changes in the amount of the benefit have affected the state’s budget liability.

=== School choice ===
CPC supports increased school choice for students. CPC runs an organization called Parent Union, which supports parents in their efforts to choose the best school for the child. Parent Union has chapters in four areas of California- Inland Empire, Los Angeles, Orange County, and San Diego.
