= Chinese for Affirmative Action =

Non-profit organization in the USA

- Formation: 1969
- Type: 501(c)(3) nonprofit organization
- Legal status: Non-profit organization
- Location: San Francisco, California
- Co-Executive Director: Cynthia Choi
- Co-Executive Director: Vincent Pan
- Website: caasf.org

Chinese for Affirmative Action (CAA) is a San Francisco–based advocacy organization. Founded in 1969, its initial goals were equality of access to employment and the creation of job opportunities for Chinese Americans. The group broadened its mission in the subsequent decades. As of 2007, its stated mission is "to defend and promote the civil and political rights of Chinese and Asian Americans within the context of, and in the interest of, advancing multiracial democracy in the United States".

== Major campaigns ==
CAA represented the plaintiffs in Lau v. Nichols, a 1974 United States Supreme Court case expanding access to bilingual education.

In 1978, CAA successfully advocated that the United States Census break down the single "Asian" category on the questionnaire into multiple distinct groups, to help better understand the Asian American population. In 1999, CAA helped advocate increased outreach in undercounted communities for the 2000 Census.

From 1982 onwards, CAA was involved in the national campaign on behalf of Chinese-American hate crime victim Vincent Chin.

In 2000, CAA helped organize a national coalition in support of Taiwanese-American scientist Wen Ho Lee.

In 2003, Chinese for Affirmative Action, the Asian Pacific American Legal Center, and the Asian Law Caucus jointly launched Asian Americans for Civil Rights and Equality (AACRE), a Sacramento, California–based organization doing progressive Asian American state-level political advocacy.

In 2014, Chinese for Affirmative Action supported the Senate Constitutional Amendment 5, an initiative would ask voters to consider eliminating California Proposition 209's ban on the use of race, sex, color, ethnicity, or national origin in recruitment, admissions, and retention programs at California's public universities and colleges. The debate over race-conscious admissions at public universities sharply divided Chinese American communities.

In 2019, via their Chinese Digital Engagement program, the CAA started a fact-checking website called PiYaoBa to help combat media misinformation that targets Chinese American communities.

== Funding ==
In 2016, about half CAA's funding came from contracts, and the remainder from gifts and grants.

== Controversies ==
=== Asian admission quotas ===
In the 1990s, CAA sided with the San Francisco Unified School District in defending a consent decree that capped attendance at Lowell High School from any given racial group. Per the policy, Chinese-American students had to score higher to attend than other groups. CAA's stance was at odds with Asian parents who opposed the policy.

== See also ==
- Affirmative action
- Desegregation
- Asian Americans
