= Richard Sander =

American legal scholar (born 1956)

- Born: Richard Henry Sander; May 26, 1956 (age 70); Washington, D.C., U.S.
- Education: Harvard University (BA); Northwestern University (MA, JD, PhD)
- Occupation: Law professor

Richard Henry Sander (born May 26, 1956) is an American legal scholar and economist. He is the Jesse Dukeminier Professor in Law at the University of California, Los Angeles School of Law and a critic of affirmative action. Sander is primarily known for producing the mismatch theory.

== Early life and education ==
Richard Sander was born on May 26, 1956, in Washington, D.C. He was raised in Northern Indiana.

In 1978, Sander graduated magna cum laude from Harvard University with a Bachelor of Arts in social studies, then pursued graduate studies at Northwestern University, where he studied law and economics. He earned his Master of Arts in economics from Northwestern in 1985, his Juris Doctor degree from the Northwestern University Pritzker School of Law in 1988, and his Ph.D. in economics from the university in 1990.

== Career ==
Following his undergraduate degree in social studies, Sander became involved with the federal Vista program working with a housing group on the south side of Chicago. During his graduate studies at Northwestern, Sander served on the board of the Rogers Park Tenants Committee and was involved in the election effort of Harold Washington, Chicago's first black mayor. Sander joined the UCLA School of Law faculty in 1989, and became a full professor there five years later. As in Chicago, in the 1990s Sander was involved in fair housing efforts in Los Angeles. He was the President of the Fair Housing Congress of Southern California, and in 1996 founded the Fair Housing Institute, helping City of Los Angeles design and implement its living wage law. Sander is chair of the University of California Initiative for Free Inquiry (UCIFI).

== Work on affirmative action ==
=== Studies ===
Sander is known for his research on affirmative action, which claims that it actually causes more negatives than benefits for African American law students by hurting them due to the overly competitive environments in more prestigious schools, through what he calls the "mismatch effect". He published his research in a 2004 article in Stanford Law Review where he claimed that if minority students had been admitted into less-competitive schools for which they would qualify without affirmative action, they would have been more successful. He has also published studies suggesting that law firms' efforts to promote diversity sometimes led to them hiring underqualified black lawyers, leading to these lawyers being more likely than their better-credentialed white counterparts to leave the firm. His research is controversial and has been widely criticized, including by Ian Ayres and Richard Brooks. Ayres and Brooks published a study in 2005 finding that eliminating affirmative action would not increase the number of black lawyers by 7.9 percent, as Sander's study had claimed, but that it would instead reduce the number of lawyers by about 12.7 percent. A 2008 study by Jesse Rothstein and Albert H. Yoon confirmed Sander's mismatch findings, but also found that eliminating affirmative action would "lead to a 63 percent decline in black matriculants at all law schools and a 90 percent decline at elite law schools." These high numbers predictions were doubted in the National Bureau of Economic Research article by Peter Arcidiacono and Michael Lovenheim; a lower, 32.5 percent was another decrease cited and considered in the article. Their 2016 article found a strong indication that racial preference results in a mismatch effect. They argued that the attendance by some African-American students to less-selective schools would significantly improve the low first attempt rate at passing the state bar, but they cautioned that such improvements could be outweighed by decreases in law school attendance.

In 2006, and in order to gain further research information regarding his mismatch theory, excepting individuals privacy information, Sander requested the California Bar to release its stored data of bar exam scores, grade point averages and LSAT scores including race and gender information of everyone who applied to the bar association. The bar denied this request based on privacy grounds. In 2008, and along with the First Amendment Coalition, Sander filed a lawsuit in California Supreme Court demanding the release of that information. On April 12, 2016, the court ruled that the California Bar was required to oblige with Sander's request. In 2018, however, the California Court of Appeals affirmed that the bar had no duty to release the records.

In 2015, Sander filed a Brief Amicus Curiae In Support of Neither Party in regards to the affirmative action issue addressed by Supreme Court of the United States in Fisher v. University of Texas.

In 2022, he wrote an article in Politico on the topic of the ongoing case Students for Fair Admissions v. Harvard. Sander encouraged the Supreme Court of the United States to extend the application of the Civil Rights Act of 1964, not the Fourteenth Amendment to the United States Constitution, to universities to limit their use of racial preferences, while leaving the issue in the realm of statutory law so that the United States Congress can address the issue as its sees fit.

=== Book ===
Sander has also co-written a book, along with Stuart Taylor, Jr., entitled Mismatch: How Affirmative Action Hurts Students It's Intended to Help, and Why Universities Won't Admit It. which expresses similar views on affirmative action as his research. The book was reviewed favorably in the New Republic by Richard Kahlenberg, who called it "perceptive" and said that it "presents a nuanced treatment of the issue".
