= Reform California =

American political action committee

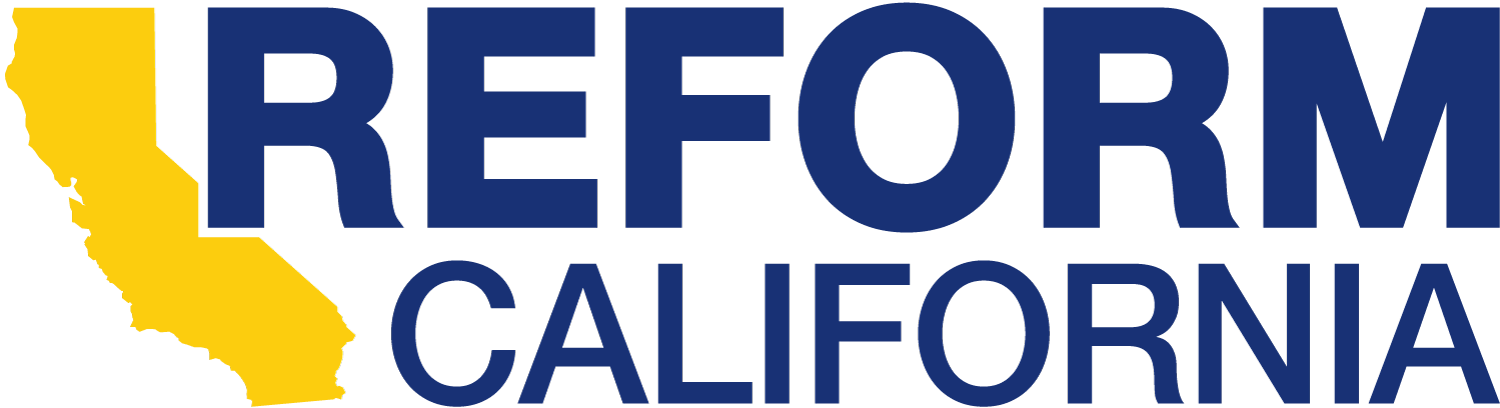
- Founded: 2003
- Founder: Carl DeMaio
- Type: Candidate committee
- Registration no.: 1476859
- Treasurer: April Boling
- Website: reformcalifornia.org
- Formerly called: Reform San Diego

Reform California, formerly known as Reform San Diego, is an American conservative political group founded by Republican California state assemblymember Carl DeMaio in 2003. The group describes itself as "a watchdog on how [California's] state and local government spends our tax dollars".

Voice of San Diego called Reform California a "high-profile player" in the unsuccessful 2021 attempt to recall California governor Gavin Newsom. The group has also been described as the lead proponent of the 2026 California voter ID initiative.

== History ==
Reform California was founded by Carl DeMaio in 2003, but gained increasing prominence over a decade later, after campaigning to support the California Public Vote on Pensions Initiative, a ballot measure that would have required a public vote on "the amount of and manner in which compensation and retirement benefits are provided to employees of a government employer." In 2017, DeMaio announced he would take a more active role within the group, which later led the campaign in support of 2018 California Proposition 6, a failed attempt to repeal California's gas tax. The group raised US$1.9 million in support of Proposition 6.

Between 2023 and 2025, Reform California raised at least US$5.8 million, primarily from small donors, leading CalMatters to label it "one of the most prolific grassroots Republican fundraising machines in the state."

=== Efforts to recall Josh Newman ===
The Sacramento Bee described Reform California as the "main ... campaign committee" behind the successful effort to recall state senator Josh Newman, who was criticized for voting to raise gas and vehicle taxes. The group reported over $44,000 in donor contributions between April and June, 2017.

=== 2026 California voter ID initiative ===
Reform California were described by CalMatters as "the group behind" the 2026 California voter ID initiative, which would introduce voter ID laws in the state of California. DeMaio unsuccessfully introduced similar legislation in 2025. DeMaio had previously filed for the ballot initiative in both 2021 and 2023, but chose not to move forward with the signature collection process so that the wording of the initiative could be tweaked.

DeMaio has positioned the initiative as "common-sense and bipartisan", and the group have highlighted polling showing most Californians support voter ID requirements. California is one of fourteen U.S. states that does not require voters to show a form of ID when casting a ballot.

== Controversies ==
=== Efforts to recall Gavin Newsom ===
Reform California supported the 2021 campaign to oust Gavin Newsom. At the time, the organization was criticized by a number of conservative activists in California, who alleged that DeMaio was "sucking up resources intended to remove Newsom to promote himself instead." Lawyer Jim Lacy stated that donors were "misled" by the group, which was also accused of diverting donations to causes that directly benefitted DeMaio. Reform California denied allegations of wrongdoing, stating that they utilize a "prudent reserve policy" to reserve campaign funds for future campaigns.

The group reported spending around US$100,000 on the effort to recall Newsom, though recall organizers said they received little help from the organization. Orrin Heatlie, one of the lead proponents of the recall effort, told Voice of San Diego that he believes donations to Reform California were "going to outside organizations or efforts that are not directly involved in the actual recall", and that the group "divert[ed] money away from the campaign into their own personal interest". Reform California collected around 700 signatures in support of the recall petition, though organizers deemed them unsuitable for submission because of an issue with the group's listed address. The group was also criticized by other conservative organizations for campaigning against Kevin Faulconer, a Republican candidate in the 2021 recall election.

In reference to Reform California's involvement in the recall effort, Jason Roe, the former director of the Michigan Republican Party, described the group as a "promote-Carl organization", alleging that donations go towards "Carl's priorities, or things that promote Carl".

=== 2024 campaign finance complaint ===
In August 2024, the Peace Officers Research Association of California (PORAC) filed a campaign finance complaint against DeMaio, alleging that he had violated campaign finance laws by using funds raised for the Reform California Voter Guide to help with his state assembly campaign. As part of an investigation into the complaint, The Sacramento Bee revealed that DeMaio's campaign failed to report a $260,000 TV ad buy in 2023. PORAC claimed DeMaio's actions were "a clear violation of both the law and the public trust".

=== 2026 Reform California voter guide ===
In 2026, the California Republican Party sent a cease and desist letter to DeMaio and Reform California, demanding the group retract their official voter guide, which allegedly imitated the state party's branding. The letter accused Reform California of running a "coordinated, brazen, and unlawful campaign to deceive California voters" in violation of state law.

The voter guide, which read 'OFFICIAL ... Republican Central Committee Slate' and prominently featured the Republican Party's elephant emblem, was published as the 'Official Republican Voter Guide'. Ashlee Titus, the California Republican Party's general counsel, stated that litigation was likely to occur. U.S. representative Darrell Issa accused DeMaio of "actively lying to Republican voters" and "wasting valuable time, energy, and resources".
