= California Taxpayers Association =

American tax advocacy group

The California Taxpayers Association is an advocacy organization in the U.S. state of California founded in 1926 to promote lower taxes in the state. The association, also known simply as CalTax, serves its members through research and advocacy on significant tax and spending issues in the legislative, executive and judicial branches of government. CalTax is led by President Teresa Casazza, a certified public accountant with many years of experience working on tax policy.

== Advocacy team ==
When working on tax policy problems before the Legislature, tax agencies, local governments, in court, or on statewide ballots, CalTax staff members closely monitor legislative, tax agency, and local government tax policy deliberations and coordinate with CalTax members to oppose tax policy changes that would increase taxes. CalTax also supports budget reform to end the state government's boom-and-bust system of budgeting.

== Publications ==
CalTaxletter

The CalTaxletter is published weekly when the Legislature is in session, and generally every other week when the Legislature is in recess.

CalTaxReports

A digest of recent tax and spending developments published 40 times a year for state policy officials and the media.

California's Tax Machine - Published by CalTax

“California’s Tax Machine,” by tax policy expert David R. Doerr, is an account of the many moving parts that make up the Golden State's tax system. The book's second edition, published in late 2008, provides full coverage of Governor Gray Davis’ term and the first five years of Governor Arnold Schwarzenegger's administration. The first edition was published in 2000.

The includes photos and tables, expanded coverage of tax-like fees, valuable descriptions of court cases that impact taxpayers, and extensive coverage of how the state's tax agencies operate California's Tax Machine.

“California’s Tax Machine” chronicles the birth of assessments on property, income, sales, utilities, vehicles, banks and corporations, inheritances, oil, alcohol, and tobacco. It includes detailed chapters on the landmark property tax initiative Proposition 13, chronicling the causes and effects of the taxpayers’ revolt.

David R. Doerr has been active in California's tax scene for five decades, serving as the chief tax consultant to legislators from both political parties, and for the past 21 years as chief tax consultant for the California Taxpayers Association.

== See also ==
- George P. Cronk, Los Angeles City Council member, 1945–52, Southern California finance director
