= Gail Heriot =

American legal scholar

Member of the United States Commission on Civil Rights
- In office 2007–2025
- Appointed by: Robert Byrd
- Preceded by: Russell Redenbaugh
- Succeeded by: Sara Frankenstein

Personal details
- Education: Northwestern University (BA); University of Chicago (JD)

Gail L. Heriot is an American attorney and legal scholar who formerly served as a professor of law at the University of San Diego School of Law. From 2007 until 2025, she was a member of the United States Commission on Civil Rights.

== Education ==
Heriot earned a Bachelor of Arts from Northwestern University in 1978 and J.D. degree from University of Chicago in 1981, where she was an editor of the University of Chicago Law Review and a member of Phi Beta Kappa and Order of the Coif.

== Career ==
Prior to becoming an academic, Heriot clerked for Seymour Simon on the Supreme Court of Illinois and practiced at law firms in Chicago and Washington, D.C. Heriot joined the faculty of the University of San Diego School of Law in 1989 where she taught, inter alia, Civil Rights Law and History, Employment Discrimination, Products Liability, Remedies, and Torts. Heriot was a professor and associate dean at George Mason University School of Law from 1998 to 1999 while on leave from the University of San Diego.

Heriot's areas of expertise include civil rights, employment law, and product liability. She is a former civil rights counsel to the United States Senate Committee on the Judiciary.

Heriot is the author of numerous academic and professional papers. She has testified extensively before governmental bodies and has authored many opinion pieces in newspapers and magazines.
