= Richard Kahlenberg =

American writer and academic

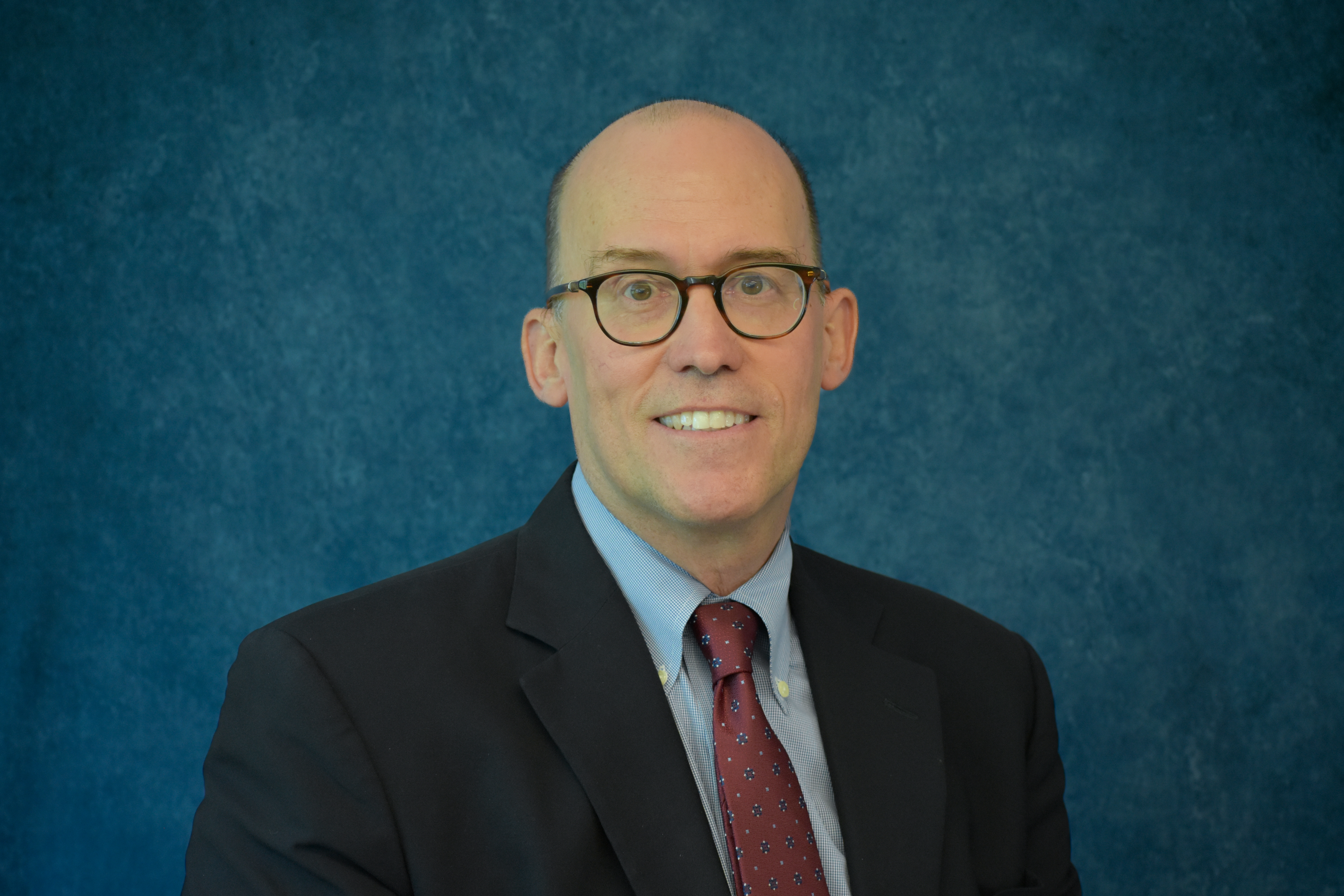
- Kahlenberg in 2025
- Born: Richard D. Kahlenberg; June 8, 1963 (age 63); United States
- Education: Harvard University (BA, JD)
- Occupations: Writer, academic

Richard D. Kahlenberg (born June 8, 1963) is an American researcher and writer who has written about a variety of education, labor and housing issues.

Kahlenberg is Director of the American Identity Project and Director of Housing Policy at the Progressive Policy Institute, and a professorial lecturer at George Washington University's Trachtenberg School of Public Policy and Public Administration.

The author or editor of 20 books, Richard D. Kahlenberg has been described as “the intellectual father of the economic integration movement” in K–12 education and “arguably the nation’s chief proponent of class-based affirmative action in higher education admissions.” He has also written extensively on housing, teachers’ unions, charter schools, community colleges, and labor organizing.

Kahlenberg's articles have been published in The New York Times, The Washington Post, The Wall Street Journal, The Economist and The Atlantic and he has appeared on ABC, CBS, CNN, FOX, C-SPAN, MSNBC, and NPR.

== Early life and education ==
Kahlenberg graduated magna cum laude from Harvard College in 1985 and then graduated cum laude from Harvard Law School with his Juris Doctor degree in 1989. Between college and law school, he spent a year in Kenya at the University of Nairobi School of Journalism, as a Rotary Scholar.

== Career ==
After graduating from law school, Kahlenberg served as a legislative assistant to Senator Charles S. Robb (D-VA) from 1989 to 1993. He then served as a visiting associate professor of constitutional law at George Washington University from 1994 to 1995 and as a Fellow at the Center for National Policy from 1996 to 1998.

From 1998 to 2022, Kahlenberg was a senior fellow at The Century Foundation, a liberal think tank founded in 1919. There, he authored or edited 15 books on K-12 schooling, higher education, and labor unions.

Proponent of Class-Based Affirmative Action

The New York Times referred to Kahlenberg as “the most prominent self-described progressive with doubts about the current version of affirmative action.” In a profile published by The New Republic, he was described as an “affirmative action prophet” for his long-standing support of class-based affirmative action, an idea that was once considered “a heresy” among liberals, but is now seen as a potential path forward for promoting racial diversity. His 1996 book The Remedy: Class, Race and Affirmative Action was named one of the best books of the year by The Washington Post. In a review for The New York Times, sociologist William Julius Wilson called it “by far the most comprehensive and thoughtful account thus far for...affirmative action based on class.”

Kahlenberg won the William A. Kaplin Award for Excellence in Higher Education Law and Policy Scholarship for his research on ways selective colleges can open the doors to more economically disadvantaged students. William G. Bowen and Michael S. McPherson wrote that he “deserves more credit than anyone else for arguing vigorously and relentlessly for stronger efforts to address disparities by socioeconomic status.”

He served as an expert witness to the plaintiffs in Students for Fair Admissions v. Harvard and Students for Fair Admissions v. University of North Carolina, cases in which the U.S. Supreme Court ultimately declared racial preference policies unlawful. A front-page profile in the New York Times labeled Kahlenberg a “liberal maverick” for his role in allying with the conservative plaintiffs. Kahlenberg detailed his involvement in the cases in his 2025 book, Class Matters: The Fight to Get Beyond Race Preferences, Reduce Inequality and Build Real Diversity at America’s Colleges. The New York Times called the book a “spirited argument for a liberal politics of class rather than race…serious, measured and fair-minded.”

Supporter of K-12 Integration by Socioeconomic Status

Kahlenberg has been a long-time supporter of efforts to use socioeconomic factors to create racial and economic diversity in K-12 schooling. His book, All Together Now: Creating Middle Class Schools through Public School Choice, was labeled “a clarion call for the socioeconomic desegregation of U.S. public schools” by the Harvard Education Review and “a substantial contribution to a national conversation” on education by the Washington Post. Kahlenberg has advised a number of school districts on diversity including New York City, Los Angeles, Chicago, and Charlotte-Mecklenburg.

Housing Expert

Kahlenberg has been a critic of exclusionary zoning laws that reduce the affordability of housing and increase economic and racial residential segregation. His 2023 book on the topic, Excluded: How Snob Zoning, NIMBYism and Class Bias Build the Walls We Don’t See, was awarded the 2023 Goddard Riverside Award for Social Justice. He has testified before Congress on the topic, and as director of housing policy at the Progressive Policy Institute, Kahlenberg has been recognized by Washington Magazine as one of the most influential people shaping policy.

Director of the American Identity Project

At the Progressive Policy Institute, Kahlenberg directs the American Identity Project, which seeks to support educators in teaching students what it means to be an American. The effort is guided by an advisory group of prominent Americans, including co-chairs David Brooks and William Galston, and members Danielle Allen, Anne Applebaum, Don Beyer, Bill Bradley, Linda Chavez, Francis Fukuyama, Doug Jones, David McCullough III, Elisa New, Johnny Taylor Jr., Ritchie Torres, and Darren Walker.

== Works ==
- Bobby Kennedy, Liberal Patriot: What RFK’s Approach Could Teach Political Leaders Today (with Ruy Teixeira) (American Enterprise Institute, 2025);
- Class Matters: The Fight to Get Beyond Race Preferences, Reduce Inequality, and Build Real Diversity at America’s Colleges (PublicAffairs Press, 2025);
- Excluded: How Snob Zoning, NIMBYism, and Class Bias Build the Walls We Don't See (PublicAffairs Press, 2023);
- A Smarter Charter: Finding What Works for Charter Schools and Public Education (with Halley Potter) (Teachers College Press, 2014);
- Why Labor Organizing Should Be a Civil Right: Rebuilding a Middle-Class Democracy by Enhancing Worker Voice (with Moshe Marvit) (Century Foundation Press, 2012);
- Tough Liberal: Albert Shanker and the Battles Over Schools, Unions, Race and Democracy (Columbia University Press, 2007);
- All Together Now: Creating Middle Class Schools through Public School Choice (Brookings Institution Press, 2001);
- The Remedy: Class, Race, and Affirmative Action (Basic Books, 1996); and
- Broken Contract: A Memoir of Harvard Law School (Hill & Wang/Farrar, Straus & Giroux, 1992.)

=== Edited volumes ===
- Restoring the American Dream: Providing Community Colleges with the Resources They Need – The Report of the Working Group on Community College Financial Resources (executive director) (2019);
- The Future of Affirmative Action: New Paths to Higher Education Diversity after Fisher v. University of Texas (2014);
- Bridging the Higher Education Divide: Strengthening Community Colleges and Restoring the American Dream, Chaired by Anthony Marx and Eduardo Padron (executive director) (2013);
- The Future of School Integration: Socioeconomic Diversity as an Education Reform Strategy (2012);
- Affirmative Action for the Rich: Legacy Preferences in College Admissions (2010);
- Rewarding Strivers: Helping Low-Income Students Succeed in College (2010);
- Improving on No Child Left Behind: Getting Education Reform Back on Track (2008);
- America's Untapped Resource: Low-Income Students in Higher Education (2004);
- Public School Choice vs. Private School Vouchers (2003);
- Divided We Fail: Coming Together Through Public School Choice. The Report of The Century Foundation Task Force on the Common School, Chaired by Lowell Weicker (executive director) (2002);
- A Notion at Risk: Preserving Public Education as an Engine for Social Mobility (2000).

== See also ==
- Affirmative action in the United States
- Albert Shanker
- Labour movement
- New York City teachers' strike of 1968
- Progressivism in the United States
