= Transportation and Land Use Coalition =

The Transportation and Land Use Coalition logo.

The Transportation and Land Use Coalition (TALC) is a non-profit organization which serves as a partnership of over 100 organizations in the San Francisco Bay Area focused on smart growth, public transportation, environmental causes, and other issues connected with transit and urban planning. TALC was founded in 1997, and is based in Oakland, California. A year after its founding, TALC's involvement in public-transportation advocacy was cited as part of a shift toward public support for increasing funding for buses, trains, and bike paths.

TALC member groups include regional and national organizations such as the Greenbelt Alliance, the Sierra Club, in addition to a wide range of local groups throughout the Bay Area.

TALC has advocated for a number of transit-related projects and ballot measures since its inception. Examples of such projects include:

- Measure B, Alameda County, 2000. The Measure would renew a half-cent sales tax to fund transportation projects. TALC supported the measure, engaging in a public education and outreach campaign; the measure passed and funded the extension of the Bay Area Rapid Transit (BART) system and other transit projects.
- Regional Measure 2, 2004. This Measure, which adopted substantial language from TALC proposals, increased bridge fare on the seven state-owned bridges in the Bay Area. The Measure passed, generating revenue for a range of projects including BART expansion and enhanced ferry service.
- AB 2444, 2006. This legislation, sponsored by TALC, would have established a vehicle registration fee, the funds from which would go to priority transit improvements and environmental projects. The bill passed in the legislature but was vetoed by Governor Arnold Schwarzenegger.

In 2008, the Transportation and Land Use Coalition was renamed TransForm.
