= National origin =

Nation where a person was born, or where that person's ancestors came from

National origin is the nation where a person was born, or where that person's ancestors came from. It also includes the diaspora of multi-ethnic states and societies that have a shared sense of common identity identical to that of a nation while being made up of several component ethnic groups. National origin can be the same, different from, or a combination of a person's national identity, which is the nation with which a person subjectively identifies with; in some cases, such as children born to expatriates, temporary residents or diplomatic and consular staff, a person may not identify with the nation in which they were born. National origin and national identity which can be tied to each other should also be distinguished from a person's nationality or citizenship which is a legal status in which a sovereign state recognizes someone as belonging to their country.

== Discrimination ==
In Europe, discrimination against a person on the basis of national origin is considered a type of racial discrimination. The UK's Race Relations Act 1976 names discrimination on the basis of national origin as discrimination on racial grounds. The European Union's Racial Equality Directive prohibits discrimination on the basis of national origin.

In the US, it is illegal to discriminate against a person on the basis of national origin in education, employment, housing, lending, or other specified areas. For example, employers cannot refuse to hire job applicants or treat employees differently because of where they were born, their ancestry, their culture, the languages they speak, or speaking with an accent. Workplace rules that require employees in the US to speak only English on the job can be a form of discrimination on the basis of national origin, but employers may have a legitimate business need for employees to speak English at work, such as to provide adequate supervision or to prevent the isolation and alienation of employees and customers that do not speak the same non-English language.

Under Australian law, discrimination on the basis of national origin is illegal, whereas discrimination on the basis of nationality or citizenship is not; national origin is determined only by the situation at an individual's time of birth (their birthplace or the national origin of their parents), not by factors subsequent to their birth (such as naturalisation or Renunciation of citizenship).
