= 350 Bay Area =

US grassroots climate movement

- Formation: 2012
- Type: 501(c)(3)
- Headquarters: Oakland, CA
- President: Nan Parks
- Parent organization: 350.org
- Revenue: $193,112 (2019)
- Website: https://350bayarea.org/

350 Bay Area is a San Francisco Bay Area regional grassroots climate activism 501(c)(3) non-profit organization. 350 Bay Area is inspired by 350.org, but has no legal connection. 350 Bay Area is associated with several local 350 groups, including 350 San Francisco, 350 East Bay, 350 Contra Costa, 350Marin, 350 Sonoma, Napa Climate NOW! and 350 Silicon Valley. The organization works to eliminate carbon pollution and achieve clean energy and environmental justice.

== History ==
In the summer of 2012 a small group of concerned and dedicated people responded to the need to mobilize millions to insist on real climate action. Inspired by 350.org, which was organizing big marches and rallies, small groups popped up all over the country to support those efforts, including groups in the Bay Area. Leaders from those local groups got together to form 350 Bay Area and 350 Bay Area Action, the sister organization that has fewer restrictions on political activity.

== Mission ==
On its website, the organization states its mission is:

We are building a grassroots climate movement in the Bay Area & beyond to eliminate carbon pollution and achieve a clean energy future with racial, economic, and environmental justice.

== High level goals ==
350 Bay Area advocates for reducing toxic air pollution, particularly in communities disproportionately affected by pollution, and expanding access to affordable renewable energy and related employment opportunities. The organization also supports transitioning buildings from fossil fuels to electric systems and promoting affordable, accessible, low-emission transportation.

== Activities ==
- 350 Bay Area has called for the Bay Area Air Quality Management District (BAAQMD), along with other environmental groups, to establish caps on refinery Greenhouse Gas (GHG) emissions.
- 350 Bay Area has been involved in the successful effort for Alameda County to ban fracking.
- 350 Bay Area campaign "Beyond The Pump" has been advocating for warning labels on gasoline pumps regarding climate change, with city ordinances in progress in Berkeley and San Francisco.
- 350 Bay Area members have protested at a Hillary Clinton fundraising event regarding the Keystone XL pipeline.
- 350 Bay Area had a booth at the San Francisco Earth Day Festival in 2013, and organized a march and rally in 2014 with Bill McKibben speaking.
- In May 2020, members campaigned to have former ExxonMobil CEO, Lee Raymond, removed from JPMorgan Chase's board of directors.
- Youth activists have demonstrated at the offices of U.S Senator Dianne Feinstein and Speaker of the House Nancy Pelosi.

== Major rallies ==
- 350 Bay Area was involved in the March for Real Climate Leadership, Feb. 2015 in Oakland calling for Governor Jerry Brown to take a stance against fracking.
- 350 Bay Area was involved in the Northern California People's Climate Rally, Sept. 21, 2014 in Oakland (the same day as the People's Climate March in New York City).
- 350 Bay Area was involved in the Summer Heat Richmond protest, Aug 3, 2013 in Richmond, where 210 people were arrested, including Bill McKibben.
- 350 Bay Area was involved in the Forward on Climate rally in San Francisco, Feb 17, 2013, against the Keystone XL pipeline.

== Governance and financials ==
In 2021, 350 Bay Area reported $478,892 in revenue. Of that, $417,594 came from contributions.

Roopak Kandasamy is the president of the organization.
