= Dan Newman (political consultant) =

American political consultant

Dan Newman is an American political consultant, who has served as campaign manager, communications director, press secretary, and consultant to dozens of campaigns around the country. He is a partner in SCN Strategies, with Ace Smith and Sean Clegg.

== Career ==
=== Initiative 773 Campaign ===
In 2001, Newman led the campaign for Washington's Initiative 773, a ballot initiative to add 60 cents to each pack of cigarettes sold in the state, to increase access to health-care to more low-income families, and to pay for tobacco-control programs. The Seattle Times on July 13, 2001 reported that when Newman and supporters of the initiative were turning in signatures to the Washington Secretary of State in Olympia, they caught the attention of a curious tourist.

There's something to learn from a story Dan Newman, Initiative 773 campaign manager, has been telling.

The incident occurred last Friday as I-773 forces were getting ready to file petitions with the Secretary of State's office in Olympia. Supporters had gathered for speeches on the Capitol steps and were getting their act together when they ran into the prototypical tourist — T-shirt, shorts, goofy hat and a carful of kids.

Newman says: "The guy kept asking questions. Where should he park? What were we doing? He stuck around and took a ton of pictures."

Newman told him the initiative, if approved, would add 60 cents to a pack of cigarettes. It aims to extend health-care access to more low-income families and pay for tobacco-control programs.

The tourist continued to snap pictures, accompanying the I-773 supporters into (Secretary of State) Sam Reed's office. Afterward, someone asked Newman, "Do you know who that is?"

Newman said he didn't. That's when he found out the identity of the "tourist": Joe Daniels, a lobbyist for Philip Morris. Asked about the encounter, Daniels said: "It was just a coincidence. I was showing my niece Alicia, here from Florida, around."

Still, there's a moral: Beware of tourists wearing goofy hats.

Despite questionable campaign tactics on the part of tobacco company opponents, Initiative 773 passed overwhelmingly: 66%-44%

=== MessageWorks LLC ===
Before joining Treasurer Angelides, Newman founded Message Works LLC a firm that provided communications services for campaigns around the country. He was also a partner in SCN Public Relations (now defunct - an earlier incarnation of the current SCN Strategies), a firm that provided research, press strategy, message development, rapid response, debate preparation as well as other strategic support to campaigns at all different levels of government. Newman has been a featured speaker at national conferences and conducted many communications and media trainings. Newman has served as a Congressional aide and worked for a Washington D.C. think tank.

=== Phil Angelides administration ===
In 2006, Newman managed media relations and communications for the California State Treasurer's Office and for State Treasurer Phil Angelides' 2006 gubernatorial campaign.

=== Involvement in Schwarzenegger remark controversy ===
On September 7, 2006, it was revealed that Governor Arnold Schwarzenegger referred to Latino Republican Assemblymember Bonnie Garcia as being fiery and hot-tempered because "black blood" mixed with "Latino blood" equals "hot." He further stated "I mean, they [Cubans and Puerto Ricans] are all very hot...they have the, you know, part of the black blood in them and part of the Latino blood in them and together that makes it." Schwarzenegger apologized for the remarks the next day, in a joint press conference with Garcia in Santa Monica, California.

The Schwarzenegger administration claimed that it was the victim of a breach of security protocols, and Andrea Lynn Hoch, Schwarzenegger's legal affairs secretary falsely stated that the file was stored "in a password-protected area of the governor's office network computer system." The California Highway Patrol was asked to investigate.

On September 13, it was discovered that the recording was obtained by members of the Angelides campaign on August 29 and August 30 stored in an MP3 file and that Newman and campaign researcher Sean Sullivan submitted it to the Los Angeles Times. Katie Levinson, a spokeswoman for the Schwarzenegger campaign wanted Angelides to "denounce the unethical actions taken on his behalf," stating that he was trying to personally smear Schwarzenegger.

In response to the claims from the Schwarzenegger administration, Angelides campaign manager Cathy Calfo dismissed the claims as being politically motivated and "completely false." In regards to the recording she stated: "What I have been told is, there was information accessed by one of our computers off of a taxpayer-funded, publicly available Web site that any member of the public would have access to..."

According to The Inquirer, the supposed URL where the recording was taken from is http://speeches.gov.ca.gov/dir/06-21.htm (now offline)

As of September 13, 2006, a cached version of the site could be found on Google, suggesting that the site was available to the public at the time, and that it was indexed on Google's servers.

Roger Salazar, a California Democratic Party spokesman also was quoted as saying - "They want to put it off onto some massive conspiracy theory... The governor's office is trying to play up the nefarious angle to deflect attention from their own incompetence — accidentally posting the recording on its own Web site. And from the recordings themselves."

In early 2007, the California Highway Patrol issued a report clearing the Angelides campaign and Sullivan and Newman of any wrongdoing. The CHP concluded in its 38-page report that the digital audio files were placed on a website that was "accessed by backwards browsing ... which does not constitute a crime." The report also indicated that "there were no security measures in place that would prevent backwards browsing." The CHP recommended that no criminal charges be filed against anyone involved in "Tapegate."

Upon being vindicated by law enforcement investigators, Newman questioned Schwarzenegger's use of law enforcement for political purposes.

Dan Newman, spokesman for the Angelides campaign, said that the results prove "that the governor's office was directly 100 percent responsible for making the tapes public...and then called in taxpayer funded law enforcement in a crude attempt to cover up his error."

He said the CHP report spells out the need for inquiries to determine if the governor's office "exerted pressure on the (Highway Patrol)" to delay the results of the inquiry until after the election. "They took five months to determine something they knew in five minutes," said Newman, who added that questions still remain about whether the governor's office used the law enforcement agency during the gubernatorial election "for purely political purposes."

=== Employment with Coughlin Stoia ===
In 2007, Newman became public affairs director for Coughlin Stoia Geller Rudman & Robbins, a top plaintiffs' law firm in California. Newman also served as spokesman for William Lerach, a former partner at Coughlin Stoia who was indicted and pleaded guilty to one felony count of conspiracy to commit obstruction of justice and making false declarations under oath. Lerach credited Newman with helping him craft his departure memo, which had allusions to Richard Nixon and The Godfather.
