= 80-20 Initiative =

Asian American political organization

80-20 Initiative logo

The 80-20 Initiative is an Asian American political organization, with two components, an 80-20 Educational Foundation which is a 501(c)(3) and the 80-20 Asian American Political Action Committee which can serve both as a Super PAC and a ordinary PAC. It is a national organization which seeks to unite 80% of Asian Americans as a block vote behind the presidential candidate who best represents the interests of Asian Americans. It is non-partisan organization.

== History ==
The "Asia Gate" of 1996–97, which was an alleged effort by the People's Republic of China to influence domestic American politics, sowed the seed for Asian-American political empowerment. Frustrated by what he viewed to be the political exploitation of Asian Americans' naïveté as evidenced by “Asia Gate”, Dr. S. B. Woo, former Lieutenant Governor of Delaware, set out to organize support to prevent its recurrence. In the foreword of his book Click on Democracy, he related his disappointment with the media, the Democratic party, and the Republican party for misrepresenting and misusing Asian Americans, and his despair over the Asian-American community’s inaction and its failure to defend itself, rooted in its lack of political maturity and cohesiveness.

As a former politician, Dr. S. B. Woo believed that in order to defend themselves, Asian Americans must develop enough political clout, to reward politicians who cared for their rightful concerns and to punish those who didn't. To communicate effectively with all Asian Americans and to forge a bloc vote, he harnessed the power of the Internet. Dr. S. B. Woo, together with several other Asian American leaders, including Dr. Larry Y. Ho, professor of two endowed Chairs at Harvard University; Henry S. Tang, Chairman of the Committee of 100; and Dr. Chang-Lin Tien, Chancellor of the University of California, Berkeley, compiled an e-mail list of 300 like-minded individuals who donated $50,000 to pursue their vision. On September 26–27, 1998, in a meeting in Foster City, California, 80-20 was born.

== Structure and function ==
80-20 was rated one of the US's two most effective cyberspace political organizations in the 2000 election.

80-20 possesses hardware and software capacities. Its hardware includes a financial reserve of approximately $8.5 million and an organizational structure composed of a 501(c)(3) educational foundation and a hybrid political action committee that can function as either a super PAC or a traditional PAC. Its software consists of an extensive, continuously updated database of around 156,000 Asian American email addresses, enabling outreach to a large segment of the community, particularly in higher education.

This infrastructure supports the organization’s efforts in political education, advocacy, and community mobilization.

== Endorsement of presidential candidates ==
Once 80-20 endorses a candidate, it organizes Asian American bloc votes for its endorsed candidate, relying partly on volunteers, ethnic media radio, print and TV ads; and mostly on its e-mail communication with its 700,000 Asian American supporters, their families and their friends. 80-20 holds its Endorsement Convention in the year of a presidential election, after candidates from both the Republican and Democratic parties have been determined. Each delegate to the convention is an unpaid volunteer who pledges in writing to advocate for 80-20’s endorsed candidate. The delegates are one third each of Democrats, Republicans, and Independents, all elected by dues-paying members, to ensure an objective nonpartisan deliberation. In the 2004 and 2008 elections, 80-20's main criterion for endorsement was the response to 80-20's questionnaire by the presidential candidates. In both years, while the Democratic candidates for President answered 80-20's questionnaire with all affirmative responses (after 80-20 revised the questions by request of the candidates), the Republican candidates did not respond to the questionnaire at all. 80-20 had initially issued a "call to action" to defeat Obama, citing "almost farcical reasons why he would not reply to OUR questionnaire". 80-20 has endorsed the Democratic candidate in the 2000, 2004, 2008, 2012, 2016 and 2020 presidential elections. in 2023, the PAC targeted Michelle Steel of California’s 45th district, ultimately contributing to her defeat in her reelection campaign.

== Stance on race-conscious admissions policies ==
Students for Fair Admissions v. Harvard was decided by the U.S. Supreme Court on June 29, 2023. In a 6–3 ruling, the Court held that Harvard’s race-conscious admissions policies violated the Equal Protection Clause. The case was widely viewed as a landmark decision with significant implications for college admissions nationwide. Several Asian American advocacy organizations participated in public education and mobilization efforts surrounding the issue. Among them, the 80-20 Initiative played an early role in raising awareness of perceived discrimination against Asian American applicants and in encouraging broad political engagement on the matter. While the case itself was litigated by Students for Fair Admissions, 80-20 has characterized the ruling as the culmination of a long-term effort to highlight fairness and equal treatment for Asian American students in the higher education admissions process.

== Raising awareness on underrepresentation ==
=== Equal employment opportunity ===
Based on publicly available government statistics, Asian Americans have the lowest chance of rising to management when compared with blacks, Hispanics and women in spite of having the highest educational attainment. This data, verified in writing by the Chief Statistician of the United States Equal Employment Opportunity Commission, was compiled by 80-20 into charts. On September 6, 2006, 80-20 took out a full-page advertisement in The Washington Post in an effort to educate the general public. Subsequently, the ad was read into the Congressional Record by Senator Tom Carper of Delaware.

80-20 obtained written commitments from nine of the eleven Democratic Presidential candidates, including then Senator Barack Obama and Senator Joe Biden, to enforce Executive Order 11246 for all Asian Americans.

=== Asian American judges ===
While Asian Americans made up 5% of the US population in 2008, only eight of the 867 (less than 1%) Article III Federal judges were Asian Americans.

During the 2008 presidential campaign, to remedy the underrepresentation of Asian Americans in the Federal judiciary, 80-20 sent out a questionnaire to all the presidential candidates. Senator Obama and Senator Biden responded and promised in writing to increase the appointment of Asian American federal judges.
