= Asian Law Caucus =

American legal aid organization

- Headquarters: 55 Columbus; San Francisco, California
- No. of offices: 1
- Major practice areas: Legal services
- Key people: Aarti Kohli, Executive Director
- Date founded: 1972
- Company type: Nonprofit organization
- Website: www.asianlawcaucus.org

Founded in 1972, the Asian Law Caucus (ALC) is the United States' first legal aid and civil rights organization serving low-income Asian-Pacific American communities. The ALC focuses housing rights, immigration and immigrant rights, labor and employment issues, student advocacy (ASPIRE), civil rights and hate violence, national security and criminal reform.

Since the majority of Asians and Pacific Islanders (APIs) in America are immigrants and refugees, the Caucus seeks to create informed and educated communities that are then empowered to assert their rights and to participate actively in American society. "[The ALC's] broad strategy [...] integrates the provision of legal services, educational programs, community organizing initiatives, and advocacy." Located in San Francisco, ALC is the oldest legal organization focused on the Asian-Pacific American community in the United States and takes on the roles of both a traditional legal services provider and a civil rights organization.

As a founding affiliate of the Asian American Center for Advancing Justice, ALC also helps to set national policies in affirmative action, voting rights, census, and language rights. The Asian American Center for Advancing Justice is the affiliation brand adopted by the Asian Law Caucus and its three affiliated civil rights organizations across the nation: Asian Pacific American Legal Center (APALC) in Los Angeles, CA; Asian American Institute (AAI) in Chicago, Illinois; and Asian American Justice Center (AAJC) in Washington, D.C.. The affiliation is being implemented in phases with the current phase at formalizing a national voice and contribution to cross-over work—like local and federal work on immigration or voting rights—while each affiliate organization remaining lead AAPI civil rights organizations in their respective locales.

== Mission ==
The mission of the Asian Law Caucus is to promote, advance, and represent the legal and civil rights of Asian and Pacific Islander (API) communities. Recognizing that social, economic, political and racial inequalities continue to exist in the United States, the Asian Law Caucus is committed to the pursuit of equality and justice for all sectors of our society, with a specific focus directed toward addressing the needs of low-income, immigrant and underserved APIs.

== Programs ==
=== Housing and Housing Rights ===
The Asian Law Caucus advocates on behalf of low income residents, workers, and small businesses in the areas of housing and community development. ALC focuses primarily on gateway communities for new immigrants, such as San Francisco Chinatown, where large numbers of tenants and seniors are in danger of displacement due to gentrification and other economic pressures.

In July 2011, the Asian Law Caucus along with the American Civil Liberties Union, National Immigration Law Center, and Hispanic Interest Coalition of Alabama filed a class-action lawsuit in the U.S. District Court for Northern Alabama against HB 56, claiming that the recently passed HB 56 "endangers public safety, invites the racial profiling of Latinos, Asians and others who appear foreign to an officer, and interferes with federal law." The lawsuit charges that HB 56 is unconstitutional in that it unlawfully interferes with federal power and authority over immigration matters, in violation of the Supremacy Clause of the U.S. Constitution; subjects Alabamians—including countless U.S. citizens and lawful permanent residents—to unlawful search and seizure, in violation of the Fourth Amendment; unlawfully deters immigrant families from enrolling their children in public schools; unconstitutionally bars many lawfully present immigrants from attending public colleges or universities in Alabama; and drastically restricts the right to enter into contracts. The suit further argued that HB 56 is an anti-immigrant legislation predominantly focused on outlawing any and all dealings with undocumented immigrants, including the most basic rights to personal business like housing and utilities contracts.

=== Immigrants' Rights ===
In the area of immigration, the Asian Law Caucus dedicates itself to the creation of a realistic path to legalization that strengthens the country and keeps families together. The Immigrants' Rights Program provides direct legal services to those in greatest need in the Asian Pacific Islander community, extending from basic family immigration petitions to naturalization assistance for disabled seniors to the defense of detained immigrants facing deportation. ALC serves hundreds of clients each year, providing services in a wide variety of languages through partnerships with community organizations from San Francisco to Sacramento on local and policy levels.

=== Fred Korematsu's Institute for Civil Rights and Education ===
The Fred. T. Korematsu Institute (KI) was founded in the name of the late Fred Korematsu, an American civil rights activist. In 1942, Mr. Korematsu was just 23 years old when he refused to report to the government's WWII incarceration camps for Japanese Americans. He was arrested and quickly convicted of defying the government's order. Not willing to accept the conviction, Mr. Korematsu took his case to the Supreme Court. The nation's highest court denied his freedom, instead validating the wholesale imprisonment of Japanese American citizens on the basis of "military necessity." The Asian Law Caucus was a key member of the legal team that re-opened the case in 1983-1984 and convinced a federal court to overturn his conviction. Mr. Korematsu continued to fight for Japanese American redress during the last decades of his life. After 9/11, he also championed the protection of civil rights for Muslim and Arab Americans. He remained an activist until his death in 2005.

In 2009, the Asian Law Caucus and Karen Korematsu, Fred Korematsu's daughter, co-founded the Korematsu Institute for Civil Rights and Education to commemorate the 25th anniversary of the reversal of Mr. Korematsu's conviction. The mission of the Korematsu Institute is to advance pan-ethnic civil rights and human rights through education, activism, and leadership development. Furthermore, it is "intended to cultivate a new generation of civil rights leaders."

=== Employment and Labor ===
In April 2011, ALC formally re-launched its Employment and Labor Program, which had been on hiatus since 2007. The program continues the Caucus' long history and commitment to fighting on behalf of low-wage immigrant workers.

A key component of the Asian Law Caucus' Employment and Labor Program is its semi-monthly workers' rights clinics. Caucus staff and volunteers provide free legal counseling and referrals to low income and other workers on a full range of employment issues, including wrongful termination, employment discrimination, workplace safety, workers' compensation, wage and hour issues, and retaliation. The clinic also provides legal representation to workers with administrative wage and hour claims and limited unemployment insurance appeals. Within the first six months of providing these services, the Caucus helped workers recover more than a quarter million dollars in back wages and settlements, not including unemployment benefits won.

=== Criminal Justice Reform ===
One of the Asian Law Caucus's major developments in 2011 was the transition of the Juvenile Justice and Education Project to the Criminal Justice Reform Program (CJR). The renamed program continues the charge begun in 2006 to bring legal resources to Asian immigrant families with youth in the juvenile justice system. The Criminal Justice Reform Program broadens "[ALC's] goal to address criminal justice concerns in the Asian Pacific Islander community while building coalitions with other communities of color."

The CJR focuses on the specific needs of limited English-speaking families and individuals caught up in the justice system while maintaining the mandates of the previous program, Juvenile Justice and Education Project, which sought to disrupt the school-to-prison pipeline by providing direct legal services, community education, and policy advocacy to assist limited English-speaking parents and youth in navigating the juvenile justice system.

=== National Security and Civil Rights ===
Through the National Security and Civil Rights Program (NSCR), the Asian Law Caucus is "committed to protecting the civil rights of individuals and communities unjustly impacted by overbroad national security policies." The NSCR Program utilizes a broad range of strategies including direct legal service, litigation, policy advocacy, community organizing, and education in an effort to impact the larger social and institutional dynamics that prevent the realization of equal rights.

Constitutional infringement along the U.S. border has been an issue for civil rights organizations since 2006. In 2009, ALC and the Asian American Legal Defense and Education Fund asked the federal government to reveal how Customs and Border Protection agents single out individuals at the border based solely on their national origin. The two organizations issued a Freedom of Information Act (FOIA) request to understand how immigration authorities' internal lists designating individuals from "special interest countries" may be used to stop innocent citizens and non-citizens for indiscriminate searches and questioning. Veena Dubal, a staff attorney at ALC in San Francisco stated that "the American public deserves to know what the policy is and how it is being used." Most recently in January 2012, the Asian Law Caucus and members of the Coalition for Safe San Francisco joined with SF Supervisor Jane Kim to the Safe SF Civil Rights Ordinance meant to end the five-year practice of placing SFPD intelligence officers under the control of the FBI in Joint Terrorism Task Force (JTTF) operations.

=== Voting Rights ===
The Voting Rights Program works with public policy and laws that continue to overlook or ignore the needs of many Asian and Pacific Islander communities. ALC's Voting Rights Program focuses on monitoring compliance with Section 203 of the federal Voting Rights Act, California re-districting, and litigation such as co-counseling on the California Voting Rights Act infringement of San Mateo County's at-large voting system for county supervisor seats this past year.
