= Abortion in Nevada =

Abortion in Nevada is legal up to the 24th week of pregnancy, under the Nevada Revised Statutes chapter 442, section 250; and after 24 weeks if the pregnancy could be fatal for the mother.

In April 2025, after US District Court Judge Anne Traum ruled that a parental notification law would become enforceable, the U.S. Court of Appeals for the Ninth Circuit placed it on hold, pending an appeal by Planned Parenthood.

62% of adults said in a 2014 poll by the Pew Research Center that abortion should be legal while 34% said it should by illegal in all or most cases. The 2023 American Values Atlas reported that, in their most recent survey, 76% of Nevadans said that abortion should be legal in all or most cases. Legislation by 2007 required informed consent. Attempts were successfully made to pass abortion legislation in May 2019, being pushed through a largely Democratic controlled state legislature. The number of abortion clinics in Nevada has declined over the years, with 25 in 1982, seventeen in 1992 and thirteen in 2014. There were 8,132 legal abortions in 2014, and 7,116 in 2015. Due to the high level of support for abortion rights in the state, continued access to abortion is supported by all parties, including the Republicans.

State funding could be used to fund abortions in case of risk of life to the mother, rape or incest but no such funding was used in 2010. There are active abortion rights and anti-abortion rights activists in the state.

In 2026, Nevada voters passed an amendment adding abortion rights to the Nevada Constitution.

== History ==
=== Legislative history ===
In 1990, Nevada voters approved Question 7 to affirm statute Nevada Revised Statutes Chapter 442, section 250 (which permits abortion up to 24 weeks gestation) by 63.5 percent of the vote. With the affirmation, the Nevada Legislature may not in any way alter that statute, unless it is first repealed by the state voters in a direct vote.

The state was one of 10 states in 2007 to have a customary informed consent provision for abortions. In August 2018, the state had a law to protect the right to have an abortion.

As of May 14, 2019, the state prohibited abortions after the fetus was viable, generally some point between week 24 and 28. This period uses a standard defined by the US Supreme Court in 1973 with the Roe v. Wade ruling. Florida, Nevada, and New York had laws prohibiting abortions after 24 weeks. This law was still in place as of mid-May 2019. The law also required that abortions be done by licensed physicians. In situations where abortions take place after 24 weeks, the law said that the procedure needed to take place at a licensed hospital.

SB 179, which would decriminalize medicated abortions, was scheduled to be voted on in late May 2019. It passed the House 27–13, with only one Democrat voting against it. Other revisions under the new law in May 2019 included abortion providers no longer needing to tell women of the "emotional implications" of having an abortion. Trust Nevada Women Act, SB 179, was signed into law by Democratic Governor Steve Sisolak on May 31, 2019. In signing the bill, he said, "Nevada has a long history of trusting the women of our state to make their own reproductive health care decisions and protecting the right to reproductive freedom." The new law made several changes to existing abortion laws in the state, including decriminalizing the performing of abortion procedures, and removing informed consent laws that said doctors needed to tell women of the "emotional implications" in having an abortion and what women should do after the procedure to avoid post-op complications; the latter was changed to require doctors to "describe the nature and consequences of the procedure" of abortion to women getting abortions. The law also meant doctors no longer had to collect data about women getting abortions related to their marital status and age. In addition, Senate Bill 94 allocated $6 million to be spent statewide for grants to family planning organizations.

On July 1, 2024, Nevada state officials formally certified a proposed amendment that would enshrine abortion access up until the point of fetal viability into the state constitution. The Nevada Right To Abortion Initiative appeared on the November 2024 and November 2026 ballots and passed, enshrining reproductive rights into the Nevada Constitution.

=== Judicial history ===
The US Supreme Court's decision in 1973's Roe v. Wade ruling meant the state could no longer regulate abortion in the first trimester. However, the Supreme Court overturned Roe v. Wade in Dobbs v. Jackson Women's Health Organization, No. 19-1392, 597 U.S. ___ (2022) later in 2022.

=== Clinic history ===
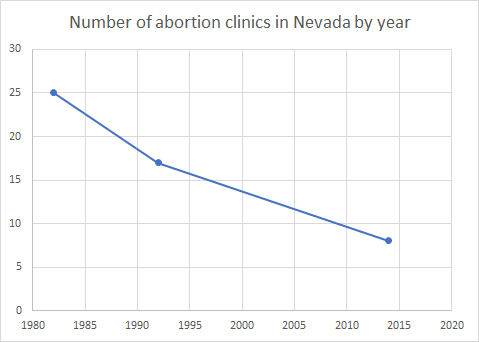
Number of abortion clinics in Nevada by year

Between 1982 and 1992, the number of abortion clinics in the state decreased by eight, going from 25 in 1982 to 17 in 1992. In 2014, the state had thirteen facilities that provided abortions, of which eight were abortion clinics. In 2014, 88% of the counties in the state did not have an abortion clinic. That year, 9% of women in the state aged 15–44 lived in a county without an abortion clinic. In 2017, there were three Planned Parenthood clinics, of which two offered abortion services, in a state with a population of 668,173 women aged 15–49.

== Statistics ==
In 1990, 149,000 women in the state faced the risk of an unintended pregnancy. Between 2011 and 2014, the state saw a decrease of 6% in the number of abortions performed in the state. In 2014, 62% of adults said in a poll by the Pew Research Center that abortion should be legal while 34% said it should be illegal in all or most cases. In 2017, the state had an infant mortality rate of 5.8 deaths per 1,000 live births.

Number of reported abortions, abortion rate and percentage change in rate by geographic region and state in 1992, 1995 and 1996
Census division and state	Number			Rate			% change 1992–1996
Census division and state	1992	1995	1996	1992	1995	1996	% change 1992–1996
US Total	1,528,930	1,363,690	1,365,730	25.9	22.9	22.9	–12
Mountain	69,600	63,390	67,020	21	17.9	18.6	–12
Arizona	20,600	18,120	19,310	24.1	19.1	19.8	–18
Colorado	19,880	15,690	18,310	23.6	18	20.9	–12
Idaho	1,710	1,500	1,600	7.2	5.8	6.1	–15
Montana	3,300	3,010	2,900	18.2	16.2	15.6	–14
Nevada	13,300	15,600	15,450	44.2	46.7	44.6	1
New Mexico	6,410	5,450	5,470	17.7	14.4	14.4	–19
Utah	3,940	3,740	3,700	9.3	8.1	7.8	–16
Wyoming	460	280	280	4.3	2.7	2.7	–37

Number, rate, and ratio of reported abortions, by reporting area of residence and occurrence and by percentage of abortions obtained by out-of-state residents, US CDC estimates
Location	Residence			Occurrence			% obtained by out-of-state residents	Year	Ref
Location	No.	Rate^	Ratio^^	No.	Rate^	Ratio^^	% obtained by out-of-state residents	Year	Ref
Nevada				13,300	44.2			1992	
Nevada				15,600	46.7			1995	
Nevada				15,450	44.6			199	
Nevada	7,870	13.9	219	8,132	14.4	227	3.9	2014	
Nevada	6,760	11.8	186	7,116	12.4	196	5.5	2015	
Nevada	6,873	11.9	190	7,284	12.6	201	5.9	2016	
^number of abortions per 1,000 women aged 15–44; ^^number of abortions per 1,000 live births

== Abortion financing ==
In 2010, the state had zero publicly funded abortions. The law as of May 1, 2018, said that potential danger to the life of the mother, pregnancy as a result of rape or incest were the only reasons that state funding could be used by women seeking abortions.

SB 94 was passed in June 2019 in the final days of the legislative session. US$6 million was allocated as part of the bill to fund reproductive assistance measures in the state through family planning grants. Money could be used by eligible organizations for a wide variety of uses including immunizations, birth control, emergency contraception, and male sterilization surgery. It did not cover abortions. This money was intended to assist low income women and women living in largely rural areas.

== Abortion rights views and activities ==
=== Protests ===
Women from the state participated in marches supporting abortion rights as part of a #StoptheBans movement in May 2019.

Abortion rights protesters were at the Nevada Capitol Building with signs to support the passage of SB 179, including pink signs that said "protect safe, legal abortion".

Following the overturn of Roe v. Wade on June 24, 2022, hundreds of abortion rights protestors rallied at the U.S. District Courthouse in Reno on June 24 and over the weekend. Hundreds of abortion rights protestors also rallied at the U.S. Courthouse in Las Vegas on June 24.

On May 20, 2024, Nevadans For Reproductive Freedom submitted over 200,000 signatures for their petition to qualify a measure for the November 2024 election ballot that would enshrine the right to abortion up to the point of fetal viability in the state constitution, almost doubling the 102,000 signatures required.

=== Views ===
Legislation co-sponsor Democratic Senator Yvanna Cancela said of the SB 94's passage, "When the rest of the country may feel hopeless, may feel bleak, they should look to Nevada as the shining beacon that we are for women's rights."

== Anti-abortion views and activities ==
=== Views ===
Following the passage of the May 2019 legislation SB 94, Republican Assemblywoman Alexis Hansen said, "This bill is a slippery slope that (will) leave women and children less informed and more susceptible to exploitation."

=== Violence ===
Rachelle "Shelley" Shannon attempted to set fires at abortion clinics in Oregon, California, Idaho and Nevada during the late 1980s and early 1990s and eventually pleaded guilty for these cases of arson. In 1993, she was found guilty of the attempted murder of George Tiller in 1993 at his Wichita, Kansas clinic.
