= Missouri Amendment 3 =

Missouri Amendment 3 may refer to:

- 2022 Missouri Amendment 3, regarding cannabis
- 2024 Missouri Amendment 3, regarding abortion
- 2026 Missouri Amendment 3, regarding abortion
