= 2024 Montana Initiative 128 =

Initiative 128
- November 5, 2024
- A constitutional initiative that would amend the Montana Constitution to expressly provide a right to make and carry out decisions about one's own pregnancy, including the right to abortion. It would prohibit the government from denying or burdening the right to abortion before fetal viability. It would also prohibit the government from denying or burdening access to an abortion when a treating health-care professional determines it is medically indicated to protect the pregnant patient's life or health. The initiative would prevent the government from penalizing patients, health-care providers, or anyone who assists someone in exercising their right to make and carry out voluntary decisions about their pregnancy.

Results
Choice	Votes	%
Yes	345,070	57.76%
No	252,300	42.24%
Valid votes	597,370	100.00%
Invalid or blank votes	0	0.00%
Total votes	597,370	100.00%

Yes
90–100%
80–90%
70–80%
60–70%
50–60%
No
90–100%
80–90%
70–80%
60–70%
50–60%

Initiative 128 was a ballot initiative that appeared on the ballot on November 5, 2024, to establish in the Constitution of Montana a right to abortion up to fetal viability. The initiative was approved by 57.8 percent of voters.

== History ==
In 1999, the Montana Supreme Court ruled in Armstrong v. State that the state constitution's right to privacy includes abortion access. In 2022, Governor Greg Gianforte called on the Montana Supreme Court to revisit its decision in Armstrong, following the U.S. Supreme Court's decision in Dobbs v. Jackson Women's Health Organization, which overturned Roe v. Wade and Planned Parenthood v. Casey. In May 2023, the Montana Supreme Court unanimously ruled in Weems v. State that the right to abortion was protected under the state constitution's right to privacy, reaffirming its prior ruling in Armstrong.

In November 2022, Montana voters narrowly rejected Legislative Referendum 131, which would have defined certain infants as "born alive" and compelled medical practitioners to provide life-sustaining care to them, no matter the prognosis, with 52.55 percent of voters opposed. Since then, Gianforte has signed into law several bills restricting abortion access, including legislation to ban dilation and evacuation abortions and another prohibiting Medicare and Medicaid funding for abortions, unless they are the result of rape or incest, though many of these laws have been challenged or struck down in court.

In November 2023, Montanans Securing Reproductive Rights (MSRR) proposed Ballot Measure #14, which would affirm the right to abortion in the Montana Constitution. In January 2024, Attorney General Austin Knudsen challenged the legal sufficiency of the ballot initiative, claiming that the measure "logrolls multiple distinct political choices into a single initiative" and "limits the ability of the state to provide for public health and safety". The Montana Supreme Court rejected Knudsen's challenge in a 6–1 ruling in March 2024, after which Knudsen sought to rewrite the language of the ballot initiative, which was immediately challenged by the MSRR as "confusing, argumentative, and prejudicial". The Supreme Court again rewrote the ballot language in a 6–0 ruling on April 1, 2024, and allowed the ballot initiative to bypass the requirement that it go before an interim committee for an up or down vote since Knudsen never found the proposal to be legally sufficient. Following this ruling, Montana Senate President Jason Ellsworth formed a new special select committee to study judicial oversight and reforms, accusing the Supreme Court of overstepping the separation of powers and alleging multiple other courts of violating the state constitution. Ellsworth also issued a subpoena to Jacobsen for all records tied to Ballot Issue 14, which he said would be "used by a legislative interim committee" to review the ballot issue. The legislative interim committee met on April 18 and voted 6–0 not to support Ballot Measure #14, with the two Democratic members of the committee and groups making up Montanans Securing Reproductive Rights declining to attend the meeting.

Montana Secretary of State Christi Jacobsen sent MSRR its ballot petition on April 5, 2024, a day after the Montana Supreme Court ordered her to do so. MSRR began collecting signatures for Initiative 128 in April 2024, and submitted about 117,000 signatures for the ballot initiative on June 21, 2024. In July 2024, MSRR accused the Montana Secretary of State of invalidating the signatures of inactive voters, prompting a legal challenge. On July 16, Lewis and Clark County District Court judge Mike Menahan ordered the Montana Secretary of State to revert rule changes that led its office to invalidate these signatures and to restore the ones it had rejected. Jacobsen appealed this ruling to the Montana Supreme Court, which unanimously upheld Menahan's ruling. County election officials verified 81,163 signatures as of July 24, 2024, putting Initiative 128 on the 2024 general ballot.

== Campaign ==
Initiative 128 was supported by Montanans Securing Reproductive Rights, which is led by Martha Fuller, the president of Planned Parenthood Advocates of Montana, and includes the ACLU of Montana and Forward Montana. It was opposed by the Montana Life Defense Fund, which is chaired by Jeff Laszloffy, the president of the Montana Family Foundation. As of October 2024, pro-amendment groups spent over $11 million on ads supporting Initiative 128, compared to about $105,000 for the referendum's opponents. Susan B. Anthony Pro-Life America and Students for Life of America have also reported spending about $160,000 on canvassing efforts opposing Initiative 128.

Supporters of Initiative 128 argued that the constitutional amendment is necessary to prevent Republican legislators from passing bills to restrict abortion in the state. The initiative's opponents argued that the amendment, if passed, would enable late-term abortions and overturn state laws banning Medicaid funding for abortion and requiring parental notification for minors that terminate their pregnancies. Initiative 128 would allow the government to regulate abortions after fetal viability, which it defines as the point in pregnancy when a treating medical provider finds that there is a significant likelihood that a fetus would be able to survive outside the uterus without extraordinary medical measures.

=== Endorsements ===
Yes

U.S. Senators

- Jon Tester, Montana (2007–2025) (Democrat)

Statewide officials

- J. B. Pritzker, Governor of Illinois (2019–present) (Democrat)

State legislators

- Kim Abbott, minority leader of the Montana House of Representatives (2021–present) from the 83rd district (2017–present) (Democrat)
- Jill Cohenour, state senator from the 42nd district (2015–2023) (Democrat)
- Pat Flowers, minority leader of the Montana Senate (2023–present) from the 32nd district (2019–present) (Democrat)

Individuals

- Michael Bloomberg, Mayor of New York City (2002–2013) (Democrat)
- Ryan Busse, Democratic nominee for governor of Montana in 2024 (Democrat)
- Raph Graybill, attorney and Democratic nominee for lieutenant governor in 2024 (Democrat)
- Alexis McGill Johnson, president and CEO of Planned Parenthood
- Mini Timmaraju, president and CEO of Reproductive Freedom for All
- Monica Tranel, former Olympian rower (Democrat)

Organizations

- American Civil Liberties Union (Note: National and Montana chapters)
- Forward Montana
- Freedom From Religion Foundation
- Montanans for Choice
- Planned Parenthood
No

U.S. representatives

- Ryan Zinke, MT-01 (2015–2017, 2023–present) (Republican)

Statewide officials

- Greg Gianforte, governor of Montana (2021–present) (Republican)
- Roger Koopman, former Montana Public Service Commissioner (2013–2021) (Republican)

State legislators

- Jason Ellsworth, president of the Montana Senate (2023–present) from the 43rd district (2019–present) (Republican)
- Jodee Etchart, state representative from the 48th district (2023–present) (Republican)
- Chris Friedel, state senator from the 26th district (2021–present) (Republican)
- Greg Hertz, state senator from the 6th district (2021–present) (Republican)
- Caleb Hinkle, state representative from the 68th district (2021–present) (Republican)
- Amy Regier, state representative from the 6th district (2021–present) (Republican)
- Keith Regier, state senator from the 3rd district (2017–present) (Republican)
- Linda Reksten, state representative from the 12th district (2021–present) (Republican)

Individuals

- Jeffrey M. Fleming, bishop of the Diocese of Great Falls–Billings
- Tim Sheehy, Republican nominee in the 2024 United States Senate election in Montana (Republican)
- Austin Vetter, bishop of the Diocese of Helena
- Michael William Warfel, bishop emeritus of the Diocese of Great Falls–Billings (2023-present)

Organizations

- Montana Family Foundation
- Students for Life of America
- Susan B. Anthony Pro-Life America
Declined to endorse

Organizations

- American College of Obstetricians and Gynecologists

== Opinion polls ==
Poll source	Date(s) administered	Sample size (Note: Key: A – all adults RV – registered voters LV – likely voters V – unclear)	Margin of error	For	Against	Undecided
MSU Billings	September 30 – October 16, 2024	760 (LV)	± 3.6%	60%	25%	10%

== Results ==
2024 Montana Initiative 128
Choice	Votes	%
For	345,070	57.76
Against	252,300	42.24
Total	597,370	100.00

=== By congressional district ===
"Yes" won both congressional districts, which both elected Republicans.

District	Yes	No	Representative
1st	61%	39%	Ryan Zinke
2nd	54%	46%	Matt Rosendale (118th Congress)
2nd	54%	46%	Troy Downing (119th Congress)

== Reactions ==
Initiative 128 would not go into effect until July 1, 2025, though many state laws restricting abortion were blocked or struck down by state courts before this date under the Montana Supreme Court's Armstrong decision. In June 2025, the Montana Family Foundation filed a lawsuit seeking to block the implementation of Initiative 128, arguing that Initiative 128 should be declared null and void because the State of Montana did not print the complete text of the amendment on the ballot and or provide voters who registered to vote on Election Day with voter guides containing the full text of the amendment. The Montana Supreme Court unanimously ruled to dismiss the challenge to the amendment on July 1, saying that the lawsuit was poorly timed and failed to adequately develop a set of facts.

During the 2025 legislative session, Republican state lawmakers introduced several bills to restrict abortions in Montana, despite Initiative 128's passage, with Senate President Matt Regier calling the newly added constitutional amendment "poorly written" and saying that some of the terms used in its language should be defined. Republican state representative Lee Deming introduced a bill that would add an amendment to the Constitution of Montana giving embryos "personhood" rights, overturning Constitutional Initiative 128. The personhood amendment passed the House in a 57–43 vote, but died in the Senate after passing 33–17, nine votes short of the 100 "aye" votes needed across both houses to pass a referendum to amend the constitution. Lawmakers tabled a number of other bills that sought to restrict abortion during the 2025 legislative session, but passed two bills prohibiting pregnancy centers from "interfering with work" by state and local government and banning the sale of whole human bodies and human fetal tissue. Both bills were signed into law by Governor Gianforte in May 2025.

== See also ==
- Abortion in Montana
- Initiatives and referendums in the United States
- 2022 Kansas abortion referendum
- 2022 California Proposition 1
- 2022 Michigan Proposal 3
- 2022 Vermont Proposal 5
- November 2023 Ohio Issue 1
- 2024 Arizona Proposition 139
- 2024 Colorado Amendment 79
- 2024 Florida Amendment 4
- 2024 Maryland Question 1
- 2024 Missouri Amendment 3
- 2024 Nebraska Initiative 439
- 2024 Nevada Question 6
- 2024 New York Proposal 1
- 2024 South Dakota Amendment G
- 2024 United States ballot measures
- 2026 Idaho Proposition 1
- 2026 Missouri Amendment 3
- 2026 Nevada Question 6
- 2026 Virginia Question 1
