= 2024 Florida Amendment 4 =

Amendment to the Florida Constitution

- November 5, 2024
- Limit Government Interference with Abortion
- Outcome: Amendment not adopted (failed to reach 60% threshold)

Results
Choice	Votes	%
Yes	6,070,758	57.17%
No	4,548,379	42.83%
Valid votes	10,619,137	96.50%
Invalid or blank votes	385,072	3.50%
Total votes	11,004,209	100.00%
Registered voters/turnout	13,949,168	78.89%

Yes
70–80%
60–70%
50–60%
No
70–80%
60–70%
50–60%

Florida Amendment 4 was a proposed amendment to the Florida Constitution, which failed on November 5, 2024. Through a statewide referendum, the amendment achieved 57% support among voters in the U.S. state of Florida, short of the 60% supermajority required by the Flordia constitution.

The amendment would have enshrined a right to abortion in the Florida Constitution before fetal viability (generally considered to be between 23 and 24 weeks gestational age) and nullified then-existing statutes such as the Heartbeat Protection Act. It would have also permitted abortion after viability (23 weeks to birth) for any reason a healthcare provider determined to be related to health.

== Content ==
The ballot summary for the amendment stated the following:

No law shall prohibit, penalize, delay, or restrict abortion before viability, or when necessary to protect the patient's health, as determined by the patient's health-care provider. This amendment does not change the Legislature's constitutional authority to require notification to a parent or guardian before a minor has an abortion.

The initiative would have added the following text to Article I of the Florida Constitution:

Except as provided in Article X, Section 22, no law shall prohibit, penalize, delay, or restrict abortion before viability, or when necessary to protect the patient's health, as determined by the patient's health-care provider.

== Financial impact statement ==
The financial impact statement for the amendment stated the following:

The proposed amendment would result in significantly more abortions and fewer live births per year in Florida. The increase in abortions could be even greater if the amendment invalidates laws requiring parental consent before minors undergo abortions and those ensuring only licensed physicians perform abortions. There is also uncertainty about whether the amendment will require the state to subsidize abortions with public funds. Litigation to resolve those and other uncertainties will result in additional costs to the state government and state courts that will negatively impact the state budget. An increase in abortions may negatively affect the growth of state and local revenues over time. Because the fiscal impact of increased abortions on state and local revenues and costs cannot be estimated with precision, the total impact of the proposed amendment is indeterminate.

The financial impact statement was strongly criticized by amendment supporters, such as Floridians Protecting Freedom, who accused it of being a misleading political statement.

== Legal challenges ==
=== Ballot access ===
Florida Attorney General Ashley Moody, a Republican, has opposed the ballot initiative since October 2023, when she asked the Florida Supreme Court to analyze the ballot initiative. In November 2023, Moody urged the Florida Supreme Court to block the ballot initiative, as she questioned the definition of "viability" and argued that the ballot initiative will "lay ticking time bombs that will enable abortion proponents later to argue that the amendment has a much broader meaning than voters would ever have thought".

The Florida Supreme Court in April 2024 approved Florida Amendment 4 to be placed on the ballot for voting in November 2024, because it adequately satisfied the requirements set. Despite Florida Attorney General Ashley Moody arguing that some of the language was deceptive, the Florida Supreme Court instead ruled that "it cannot be said that the ballot summary will mislead voters regarding the actual text of the proposed amendment." The Florida Supreme Court further stated that "the broad sweep of this proposed amendment is obvious in the language of the summary. Denying this requires a flight from reality", while ruling that there is "no basis for concluding that the proposed amendment is facially invalid under the United States Constitution."

=== Attempted censorship of campaign advertising ===
On October 4, 2024, the Florida Department of Health's general counsel John Wilson sent cease and desist notices to multiple Florida television stations, threatening prosecution if they did not retract a campaign advertisement for Amendment 4. The department alleged the ad falsely implied that abortions to protect the life of the mother were not possible under current state law; while the Heartbeat Protection Act does contain exceptions for these scenarios, they are considered vague, and there have been reports of patients turned away by Florida hospitals due to uncertainties under the law. The letter asserted that the ad "threatens or impairs" the health of Florida residents by encouraging them to delay their abortion or pursue one out-of-state, therefore constituting a "sanitary nuisance" punishable as a criminal misdemeanor under state law. One station—WINK-TV in Fort Myers—complied with the cease and desist order.

The threat was criticized by Floridians Protecting Freedom (FPF)—the organization who produced the ad—who stated that it was an "unconstitutional state action", and "a textbook example of government coercion that violates the First Amendment." FCC chairwoman Jessica Rosenworcel stated that "threats against broadcast stations for airing content that conflicts with the government's views are dangerous and undermine the fundamental principle of free speech." On October 12, it was reported that Wilson had quietly resigned.

On October 16, FPF filed a lawsuit against the Florida government, alleging "unconstitutional coercion and viewpoint discrimination" in its threats against television stations. The suit argued that the Florida government "cannot use its coercive powers as the state to attempt to chill or suppress the speech of FPF or others who would speak in support of the amendment or facilitate that speech. Wilson and surgeon general Joseph Ladapo are named in the lawsuit. The next day, a 12-day restraining order was granted against Ladapo by Judge Mark Walker, stating "to keep it simple for the State of Florida: it's the First Amendment, stupid."

In an affidavit, Wilson revealed that he had been directed to send the letters by Ryan Dean Newman and Jed Doty—the general counsel and deputy general counsel of Governor Ron DeSantis. He stated that he was not involved in the writing of the letters, and that he had resigned from his position in condemnation of their actions. FPF subsequently dropped Wilson from the suit.

== Support and opposition ==
Yes

U.S. executive branch officials

- Joe Biden, 46th President of the United States (2021–2025) (Democratic)

Labor unions

- 1199SEIU United Healthcare Workers East

Organizations

- ACLU of Florida
- Catholics for Choice
- Equality Florida
- Fairness Project
- Florida Democratic Party
- Florida Women's Freedom Coalition
- Freedom From Religion Foundation
- League of Women Voters of Florida
- Planned Parenthood Action Fund
- Reproductive Freedom for All
No

U.S. executive branch officials

- Donald Trump, 45th President of the United States (2017–2021, 2025–present) (Republican)

U.S. senators

- Marco Rubio, U.S. Senator from Florida (2011–2025) (Republican)
- Rick Scott, U.S. Senator from Florida (2019–present) (Republican)

U.S. representatives

- Aaron Bean, U.S. Representatives from FL-04 (2023–present) (Republican)
- Byron Donalds, U.S. Representative from FL-19 (2021–present) (Republican)
- Neal Dunn, U.S. Representative from FL-02 (2017–present) (Republican)
- Matt Gaetz, U.S. Representative from FL-01 (2017–2024) (Republican)
- Cory Mills, U.S. Representative from FL-07 (2023–present) (Republican)
- Greg Steube, U.S. Representative from FL-17 (2019–present) (Republican)

Statewide officials

- Ron DeSantis, 46th Governor of Florida (2019–present) (Republican)
- Ashley Moody, 38th Florida Attorney General (2019–2025) (Republican)

State senators

- Jay Collins, state senator from the 14th district (2022–2025) (Republican)

Individuals

- Tony Dungy, former head coach of the Tampa Bay Buccaneers (1996–2001) and the Indianapolis Colts (2002–2008)

Organizations

- Democrats for Life of Florida
- Republican Party of Florida
- Liberty Counsel
- National Right to Life Committee
- Students for Life of America
- Susan B. Anthony Pro-Life America

Florida governor Ron DeSantis in April 2024 criticized Florida Amendment 4 as "radical" and "very, very extreme". Florida State Senator Shevrin Jones supported the amendment, stating "Abortion IS healthcare, and every Floridian should be able to access the care they need without government interference."

Former President Donald Trump, who is a Florida resident and the Republican presidential nominee for the 2024 presidential election, has stated that he will vote "No" on the amendment, after previously stating that he is "going to be voting that we need more than six weeks".

== Polling ==
A 60% supermajority vote is required for the amendment to be approved.

Poll source	Date(s) administered	Sample size (Note: Key: A – all adults RV – registered voters LV – likely voters V – unclear)	Margin of error	For (Note: 60% approval is required for a Florida constitutional amendment)	Against	Undecided
Stetson University	October 25 – November 1, 2024	452 (LV)	± 5.0%	64%	36%	–
Florida Atlantic University/Mainstreet Research	October 19–27, 2024	913 (RV)	± 3.2%	58%	32%	11%
St. Pete Polls (Note: Poll sponsored by Florida Politics)	October 23–25, 2024	1,227 (LV)	± 2.8%	54%	38%	8%
University of North Florida	October 7–18, 2024	853 (LV)	± 3.49%	60%	32%	8%
New York Times/Siena College	September 29 – October 6, 2024	622 (LV)	± 4.8%	46%	38%	16%
Mason-Dixon Polling & Strategy	October 1–4, 2024	625 (RV)	± 4.0%	61%	33%	6%
Public Policy Polling (D) (Note: Poll sponsored by the Clean and Prosperous America (PAC))	September 25–26, 2024	808 (RV)	± 3.5%	58%	31%	11%
Victory Insights (R)	September 22–25, 2024	600 (LV)	± 4.4%	50%	29%	21%
NextGen Polling (Note: Poll sponsored by Pro-Life PC & Life First PC)	September 6–9, 2024	1,745 (LV)	± 2.0%	57%	27%	16%
Public Policy Polling (D) (Note: Poll sponsored by Clean and Prosperous America PAC)	August 21–22, 2024	837 (RV)	± 3.4%	61%	25%	14%
Florida Atlantic University/Mainstreet Research	August 10–11, 2024	1,055 (RV)	± 3.0%	56%	21%	23%
University of North Florida	July 24–27, 2024	774 (LV)	± 4.6%	69%	23%	8%
Fox News/Beacon Research/Shaw & Company Research	June 1–4, 2024	1,075 (RV)	± 3.0%	69%	27%	4%
CBS News/YouGov	May 10–16, 2024	1,576 (LV)	± 3.1%	60%	20%	19%
Cherry Communications (R) (Note: Poll sponsored by the Florida Chamber of Commerce)	April 28 – May 7, 2024	609 (LV)	± 4.0%	61%	29%	10%
Florida Atlantic University/Mainstreet Research	April 15–17, 2024	865 (A)	± 3.3%	49%	19%	32%
Emerson College	April 9–10, 2024	1,000 (RV)	± 3.0%	42%	25%	32%
USA Today/Ipsos	April 5–7, 2024	890 (RV)	± 4.1%	57%	36%	6%
University of North Florida	November 6–26, 2023	716 (RV)	± 4.37%	62%	29%	9%

== Results ==
=== By county ===
County	Yes		No		Total
County	#	%	#	%	Total
Alachua	92,163	68.13%	43,111	31.87%	135,274
Baker	3,618	24.56%	11,111	75.44%	14,729
Bay	42,780	44.36%	53,659	55.64%	96,439
Bradford	4,583	33.77%	8,988	66.23%	13,571
Brevard	197,886	55.51%	158,631	44.49%	356,517
Broward	578,431	68.96%	260,403	31.04%	838,834
Calhoun	1,986	31.62%	4,294	68.38%	6,280
Charlotte	63,573	52.5%	57,526	47.5%	121,099
Citrus	43,880	45.65%	52,244	54.35%	96,124
Clay	55,235	44.39%	69,198	55.61%	124,433
Collier	104,228	49.76%	105,245	50.24%	209,473
Columbia	12,784	38.67%	20,275	61.33%	33,059
Desoto	5,231	43.26%	6,861	56.74%	12,092
Dixie	2,444	30.49%	5,571	69.51%	8,015
Duval	271,761	58.56%	192,310	41.44%	464,071
Escambia	77,400	48.21%	83,140	51.79%	160,540
Flagler	40,301	51.61%	37,780	48.39%	78,081
Franklin	2,948	44.53%	3,672	55.47%	6,620
Gadsden	13,005	60.1%	8,634	39.9%	21,639
Gilchrist	3,193	30.17%	7,390	69.83%	10,583
Glades	2,089	40.59%	3,057	59.41%	5,146
Gulf	3,395	39.77%	5,141	60.23%	8,536
Hamilton	2,181	39.29%	3,370	60.71%	5,551
Hardee	2,627	33.03%	5,326	66.97%	7,953
Hendry	5,916	45.44%	7,103	54.56%	13,019
Hernando	54,831	50.54%	53,665	49.46%	108,496
Highlands	22,331	44.08%	28,324	55.92%	50,655
Hillsborough	398,948	60.82%	257,029	39.18%	655,977
Holmes	2,161	24.04%	6,829	75.96%	8,990
Indian River	51,402	53.09%	45,414	46.91%	96,816
Jackson	7,724	35.32%	14,146	64.68%	21,870
Jefferson	3,700	43.94%	4,721	56.06%	8,421
Lafayette	882	23.91%	2,807	76.09%	3,689
Lake	114,541	51.38%	108,370	48.62%	222,911
Lee	202,866	53.55%	175,951	46.45%	378,817
Leon	102,266	65.79%	53,170	34.21%	155,436
Levy	9,787	40.8%	14,199	59.2%	23,986
Liberty	1,048	30.64%	2,372	69.36%	3,420
Madison	3,418	38.08%	5,559	61.92%	8,977
Manatee	124,208	55.14%	101,071	44.86%	225,279
Marion	103,870	49.73%	104,986	50.27%	208,856
Martin	52,118	54.16%	44,105	45.84%	96,223
Miami-Dade	618,188	58.69%	435,185	41.31%	1,053,373
Monroe	27,672	64.24%	15,401	35.76%	43,073
Nassau	26,407	40.94%	38,102	59.06%	64,509
Okaloosa	48,973	43.64%	63,251	56.36%	112,224
Okeechobee	6,651	42.18%	9,119	57.82%	15,770
Orange	383,391	65.04%	206,093	34.96%	589,484
Osceola	95,792	57.5%	70,816	42.5%	166,608
Palm Beach	477,108	65.74%	248,619	34.26%	725,727
Pasco	171,517	55.31%	138,580	44.69%	310,097
Pinellas	319,590	63.63%	182,661	36.37%	502,251
Polk	174,725	51.44%	164,924	48.56%	339,649
Putnam	14,817	41.38%	20,987	58.62%	35,804
Santa Rosa	42,922	38.63%	68,188	61.37%	111,110
Sarasota	159,896	58.55%	113,194	41.45%	273,090
Seminole	151,224	60.37%	99,279	39.63%	250,503
St. Johns	96,070	49.43%	98,284	50.57%	194,354
St. Lucie	104,516	57.8%	76,292	42.2%	180,808
Sumter	49,023	47.89%	53,351	52.11%	102,374
Suwannee	7,064	32.89%	14,416	67.11%	21,480
Taylor	3,410	35.06%	6,316	64.94%	9,726
Union	1,735	28.16%	4,427	71.84%	6,162
Volusia	169,511	55.85%	133,990	44.15%	303,501
Wakulla	8,258	42.12%	11,347	57.88%	19,605
Walton	18,869	38.57%	30,050	61.43%	48,919
Washington	3,690	29.66%	8,749	70.34%	12,439
Total	6,070,758	57.17%	4,548,379	42.83%	10,619,137

=== By congressional district ===
"Yes" won 25 of 28 congressional districts.

District	Yes	No	Representative
1st	44%	56%	Matt Gaetz
2nd	51%	49%	Neal Dunn
3rd	51%	49%	Kat Cammack
4th	53%	47%	Aaron Bean
5th	53%	47%	John Rutherford
6th	51%	49%	Michael Waltz
7th	58%	42%	Cory Mills
8th	55%	45%	Bill Posey (118th Congress)
8th	55%	45%	Mike Haridopolos (119th Congress)
9th	60%	40%	Darren Soto
10th	68%	32%	Maxwell Frost
11th	55%	45%	Daniel Webster
12th	52%	48%	Gus Bilirakis
13th	61%	39%	Anna Paulina Luna
14th	67%	33%	Kathy Castor
15th	57%	43%	Laurel Lee
16th	57%	43%	Vern Buchanan
17th	56%	44%	Greg Steube
18th	48%	52%	Scott Franklin
19th	54%	46%	Byron Donalds
20th	72%	28%	Sheila Cherfilus-McCormick
21st	58%	42%	Brian Mast
22nd	68%	32%	Lois Frankel
23rd	68%	32%	Jared Moskowitz
24th	73%	27%	Frederica Wilson
25th	66%	34%	Debbie Wasserman Schultz
26th	49%	51%	Mario Díaz-Balart
27th	58%	42%	María Elvira Salazar
28th	54%	46%	Carlos A. Giménez

== See also ==
- Abortion in Florida
- 2024 Florida Amendment 3
- 2022 Kansas abortion referendum
- 2022 California Proposition 1
- 2022 Michigan Proposal 3
- 2022 Vermont Proposal 5
- November 2023 Ohio Issue 1
- 2024 Arizona Proposition 139
- 2024 Colorado Amendment 79
- 2024 Maryland Question 1
- 2024 Missouri Amendment 3
- 2024 Montana Initiative 128
- 2024 Nebraska Initiative 439
- 2024 Nevada Question 6
- 2024 New York Proposal 1
- 2024 South Dakota Amendment G
- 2024 United States ballot measures
- 2026 Idaho Proposition 1
- 2026 Missouri Amendment 3
- 2026 Nevada Question 6
- 2026 Virginia Question 1

== Notes ==
Partisan clients
