= 2026 Idaho Proposition 1 =

Referendum on abortion and related matters

- November 3, 2026
- Reproductive Freedom and Privacy Act Initiative
- Reporting: 99% as of 9:00 P.M. MST
- Outcome: Not passed

Results
Choice	Votes	%
Yes	318,849	44.06%
No	404,870	55.94%
County results
Yes
70–80%
60–70%
50–60%
No
80–90%
70–80%
60–70%
50–60%

Proposition 1 was a voter initiative decided by Idaho voters on November 3, 2026. The measure sought to amend state law to establish a right to abortion up to the point of fetal viability, (Note: After fetal viability, abortion would have been allowed only in cases of a "medical emergency," as defined by the initiative.) and a right to make decisions regarding contraception, fertility treatment, and prenatal and postpartum care.

The amendment failed to pass with 56% of voters rejecting it, leaving Idaho's near-total ban on abortion in place. It was the fourth U.S. state referendum seeking to establish a right to abortion to fail since Roe v. Wade was overturned (after 2024 Florida Amendment 4, 2024 Nebraska Initiative 439, and 2024 South Dakota Amendment G).

== Background ==
Since 2022, when the United States Supreme Court overturned Roe v. Wade which had recognized the right to abortion nationwide, all states have the right to decide on the issue. As of 2026, Idaho has one of the United States' most strict abortion bans. The state's current laws allow for abortion if the pregnancy was a result of rape or incest, or if it is necessary to save the mother's life. In August 2026, a federal judge ruled that a woman may receive an abortion if there are serious risks to her health, overturning the criminal laws against such cases. However, this ruling was overturned on October 30 following an appeal of the decision.

If passed, Proposition 1 would have returned Idaho's laws on abortion back to the standard they were at when Roe v. Wade was in place.

In the years leading up to the referendum, Idaho experienced shortfalls in OB-GYN and maternal healthcare, and the debate regarding whether and to what degree this may have been influenced by the state's abortion ban has been reported on by state and national media outlets.

=== Ballot initiative ===
A volunteer-run group named Idahoans United for Women & Families initiated the measure. The group, composed of 1,255 unpaid volunteers, gathered over 110,000 signatures. Only 70,725 signatures were necessary to make the ballot.

While abortion initiatives decided by voters in other U.S. states in 2024 received high levels of funding, Proposition 1 did not. The ACLU, for example, which backed abortion measures in other states, did not provide financial backing for Idaho's measure.

== Contents ==
A mailer in favor of Proposition 1.

A yard sign against Proposition 1.

On the ballot, Idaho voters were shown the following question and information:

Proposition 1

Measure creating right to abortion before fetus viability, and post-viability to protect health; right to privacy; healthcare provider liability protections.

The measure seeks to change Idaho's laws by introducing a right to reproductive freedom and privacy including a right to abortion up to the point of the fetus's ability to survive outside the womb. After fetal viability, there would be no general right to abortion except in cases of "medical emergency." The "medical emergency" exception would expand Idaho's current life exception and allow abortions when pregnant women face complicating physical conditions that threaten their life or health, "including serious impairment to a bodily function" or "serious dysfunction of any bodily organ or part."

The proposed measure codifies a right to make reproductive decisions, including contraception, fertility treatment, and prenatal and postpartum care. This includes a "right of privacy" in making these decisions. The measure seeks to prevent the state from enforcing certain abortion laws protecting the life of the unborn child. It would also impose a requirement that any restrictions on reproductive decisions, including abortion prior to fetus viability, must be "narrowly tailored to improve or maintain the health of the person seeking reproductive health care." The measure would also prevent the state from penalizing patients, healthcare providers, or anyone who assists in exercising the proposed right.

Funding Source Statement: No funding source is required for the Reproductive Freedom and Privacy Act as it does not create any new financial obligation on the state. Because no funding source is required, the Act has no impact on income taxes, sales tax, or product taxes.

Fiscal Impact Statement: The State estimates the initiative would increase state expenditures between $3,100 and $7,800 annually, less than 0.001% of the state share of Idaho's Medicaid budget. This impact is derived from the costs of treating chemical abortion complications for women enrolled in Idaho's Medicaid program. Medicaid covers medically necessary services to treat complications from all abortions. It is anticipated that as legal abortions increase, the complications will also increase. This will likely result in an increase in Medicaid covered services and expenditures to treat complications from chemical abortions, which the State has reliable and readily available data to support.

Question: Shall the above-entitled measure proposed by Proposition One be approved?

A YES vote would support creating a right to abortion before fetal viability—defined as a fetus’ ability to survive without extraordinary medical measures—and after fetal viability in cases of medical emergency; providing protections against professional discipline and civil and criminal liability for healthcare providers; and codifying a statutory reproductive right to freedom and privacy.

A NO vote would support making no change to Idaho's current law, which preserves the life of preborn children by prohibiting abortion, except when necessary to prevent the death of the pregnant woman, and during the first trimester in documented cases of rape or incest reported to law enforcement.

O Yes

O No

== Endorsements ==
Yes

Statewide officials

- John Stegner, former justice of the Idaho Supreme Court (2018–2023) (Independent)

State legislators

- Todd Achilles, former state representative from the 16B district (2024–2025) (Independent)
- Soñia Galaviz, state representative from the 16A district (2022–present) (Democratic)
- Anne Pasley-Stuart, former state representative from the 19A district (2002–2010) (Democratic)
- Nate Roberts, former state representative from the 29B district (2022–2024) (Democratic)
- John Rusche, former state representative from the 6B district (2004–2016) (Democratic)

Individuals

- Lauren Necochea, chair of the Idaho Democratic Party

Organizations

- ACLU Idaho
- Boise Democratic Socialists of America
- Planned Parenthood Alliance Advocates
- Reproductive Freedom for All

Political parties

- Idaho Democratic Party
No

State legislators

- Cindy Agidius, former state representative from the 5A district (2012–2014) (Republican)
- Ken Andrus, former state representative from the 28A district (2004–2016) (Republican)
- Vito Barbieri, state representative from the 3A district (2022–present) (Republican)
- Camille Blaylock, state senator from the 11th district (2024–present) (Republican)
- Judy Boyle, state representative from the 9B district (2008–present) (Republican)
- Jeff Cornilles, state representative from the 12A district (2022–present) (Republican)
- Cindy Carlson, state senator from the 7th district (2022–present) (Republican)
- Gregory Chaney, former state representative from the 10B district (2014–2022) (Republican)
- Jaron Crane, state representative from the 12B district (2019–present) (Republican)
- Dan Garner, state representative from the 28B district (2022–present) (Republican)
- Jim Guthrie, state senator from the 28th district (2012–present) (Republican)
- Kyle Harris, state representative from the 7A district (2024–present) (Republican)
- Mark Harris, state senator from the 32nd district (2015–present) (Republican)
- Scott Herndon, former state senator from the 1st district (2022–2024) (Republican)
- Clint Hostetler, state representative from the 24A district (2024–present) (Republican)
- Dustin Manwaring, state representative from the 29A district (2016–2018; 2020–present) (Republican)
- Kent Marmon, state representative from the 11A district (2024–present) (Republican)
- Ronald M. Nate, former state representative from the 34B district (2014–2018; 2020–2022) (Republican)
- Mike Pohanka, state representative from the 26A district (2024–present) (Republican)
- Elaine Price, state representative from the 4B district (2022–present) (Republican)
- Cornel Rasor, state representative from the 1B district (2024–present) (Republican)
- Steve Tanner, state representative from the 13B district (2024–present) (Republican)
- Julianne Young, former state representative from the 30B district (2018–2024) (Republican)
- Christy Zito, state senator from the 8th district (2024–present) (Republican)

Individuals

- Dorothy Moon, chair of the Idaho Republican Party
- Pro-Life, perennial candidate

Organizations

- The Church of Jesus Christ of Latter-day Saints
- Ethics & Religious Liberty Commission
- Idaho Family Policy Center
- Idaho Freedom Foundation
- Idaho Right to Life
- Liberty Counsel Action
- Roman Catholic Diocese of Boise

Political parties

- Idaho Republican Party

== Polling ==
Poll source	Date(s) administered	Sample size	Margin of error	Phrasing	Support	Oppose	Undecided
Boise State University	November 8–17, 2025	508 (Note: "[A]dults who currently live in Idaho.")	± 3.1%	"In November 2026, there could be a ballot initiative before Idaho voters titled the “Reproductive Freedom and Privacy Act.” This act would establish a right to make private reproductive health care decisions, including abortion up to fetal viability and in medical emergencies. Hearing this, would you say you support or oppose this ballot initiative?"	61% (Note: Rounded up from 60.5%.)	28% (Note: Rounded up from 27.6%.)	12% (Note: Rounded up from 11.9%.)
Boise State University	November 8–17, 2025	492 (Note: "[A]dults who currently live in Idaho.")	± 3.1%	"In November 2026, there could be a ballot initiative before Idaho voters. This act would establish a right to make private reproductive health care decisions, including abortion up to fetal viability and in medical emergencies. Hearing this, would you say you support or oppose this ballot initiative?"	59% (Note: Rounded up from 58.9%.)	32% (Note: Rounded up from 31.5%.)	10% (Note: Rounded up from 9.6%.)

== See also ==
- 2026 Idaho Official State Gun Question, another ballot measure on the ballot for Idaho voters in 2026
- 2022 Kansas abortion referendum
- 2022 California Proposition 1
- 2022 Michigan Proposal 3
- 2022 Vermont Proposal 5
- November 2023 Ohio Issue 1
- 2024 Arizona Proposition 139
- 2024 Colorado Amendment 79
- 2024 Florida Amendment 4
- 2024 Maryland Question 1
- 2024 Missouri Amendment 3
- 2024 Montana Initiative 128
- 2024 Nebraska Initiative 439
- 2024 Nevada Question 6
- 2024 New York Proposal 1
- 2024 South Dakota Amendment G
- 2024 United States ballot measures
- 2026 Missouri Amendment 3
- 2026 Nevada Question 6
- 2026 Virginia Question 1
