= 2024 South Dakota Amendment G =

Proposed amendment to the South Dakota Constitution

- November 5, 2024
- Right to Abortion Initiative

Results
Choice	Votes	%
Yes	176,809	41.41%
No	250,136	58.59%
Valid votes	426,945	100.00%
Invalid or blank votes	0	0.00%
Total votes	426,945	100.00%
Registered voters/turnout	624,186	68.4%
County results
No
80–90%
70–80%
60–70%
50–60%
Yes
60–70%
50–60%

South Dakota Amendment G was a proposed constitutional amendment that appeared on the ballot on November 5, 2024. If passed, the amendment would have established a right to abortion in the Constitution of South Dakota up until approximately the beginning of the third trimester (Note: Amendment G's text is not explicitly clear on when abortion would be prohibited. The South Dakota Attorney General's opinion suggested it would require judicial review.) of pregnancy. The amendment failed to pass, making it the second referendum about abortion since Dobbs v. Jackson Women's Health Organization to come out as anti-abortion and preserve the state's ban.

== Text ==
That Article VI of the Constitution of the State of South Dakota be amended by adding a NEW SECTION:

Before the end of the first trimester, the State may not regulate a pregnant woman's abortion decision and its effectuation, which must be left to the judgment of the pregnant woman.

After the end of the first trimester and until the end of the second trimester, the State may regulate the pregnant woman's abortion decision and its effectuation only in ways that are reasonably related to the physical health of the pregnant woman.

After the end of the second trimester, the State may regulate or prohibit abortion, except when abortion is necessary, in the medical judgment of the woman's physician, to preserve the life and health of the pregnant woman.

== Background ==
=== South Dakota's abortion laws ===
In the 19th century, bans by state legislatures on abortion were about protecting the life of the mother given the number of deaths caused by abortions; state governments saw themselves as looking out for the lives of their citizens. South Dakota's first ban on abortion was passed in 1877. It read:

“Every person who administers to any pregnant woman, or who prescribes for any such woman, or advises or procures any such woman to take any medicine, drug or substance, or uses or employs any instrument, or other means whatever with intent thereby to procure the miscarriage of such woman, unless the same is necessary to preserve her life, is punishable by imprisonment in the territorial prison not exceeding three years, or in a county jail not exceeding one year.”

By 1950, the state legislature had passed a law stating that a woman who had an abortion or actively sought to have an abortion, regardless of whether she went through with it, was guilty of a criminal offense. In 1972, the South Dakota Supreme Court unanimously upheld the constitutionality of the state's abortion ban in State v. Munson. Munson was overruled less than a year later due to the United States Supreme Court's decision in Roe v. Wade.

In 2005, the South Dakota Legislature enacted a trigger ban on abortion, which would ban abortion if Roe v. Wade was overturned. A year later, Governor Mike Rounds signed the Women's Health and Human Life Protection Act, a second total ban on abortion, into law. The law's ultimate goal was for the United States Supreme Court to overrule Roe. The act was ultimately repealed later that year through a ballot initiative led by Planned Parenthood.

In June 2022, Planned Parenthood announced it would no longer provide abortion services in the state due to the pending decision in Dobbs v. Jackson Women's Health Organization. This left the state with no abortion provider until the court's decision a week later. After the court's decision in Dobbs, the state's trigger ban went into effect immediately.

=== Ballot measure submission ===
In 2022, Dakotans for Health, the group sponsoring the initiative, filed the amendment with Steve Barnett, the then-South Dakota Secretary of State. Barnett approved the measure for circulation on September 19, 2022. On May 1, 2024, the group submitted some 55,000 signatures, well over the 35,000 needed to gain ballot access. South Dakota Secretary of State Monae Johnson certified the petition on May 17, 2024.

== Campaign ==
=== Comments by Governor Kristi Noem ===
Kristi Noem
(@KristiNoem)
tweeted:

.@realDonaldTrump is exactly right… this is about “precious babies.” It should be easier for moms, dads, and families to have babies — not harder. Different states will make different decisions on Life. What voters want in South Dakota might be different than what voters want in California. South Dakota is proud to stand for LIFE and support babies, moms, and families.

April 8, 2024

Before the organizers submitted the required signatures for the initiative, South Dakota's governor Kristi Noem had garnered controversy for her position on the state's abortion ban. In particular, her defense of the ban's lack of exceptions for rape and incest have been viewed as controversial. In response to a video Donald Trump made regarding his position that the states should decide on abortion access, Noem echoed this sentiment and remarked, "Different states will make different decisions on Life. What voters want in South Dakota might be different than what voters want in California. South Dakota is proud to stand for LIFE and support babies, moms, and families."

Shortly after this post, Noem reaffirmed this belief by saying, "The people will vote and they’ll decide what our state [abortion] law looks like...We get so much arguing and finger pointing. I’d rather that people just go out and have conversations. We, clearly, in the pro-life community, need to win people’s hearts and minds and that starts with loving people and helping mothers in crisis." Noem also recognized that she would not have the last say on abortion access in the state, acknowledging that she "doesn’t get to be a dictator" on the laws.

=== Gestational limitation ===
South Dakota's current abortion law outlaws all abortions with few exceptions. The proposed amendment's language is based on the trimester framework originally in the 1973 decision in Roe v. Wade. At the time, fetal viability was generally regarded to occur around 28 weeks gestation. However, viability is now considered to be closer to around 23–24 weeks. Additionally, the trimester framework in Roe was overturned in 1992 in Planned Parenthood v. Casey. As a result, there have been questions and misinformation about the gestational limitations of Amendment G. Opponents of the amendment have argued this would allow abortions until the moment of birth. Similarly, abortion rights groups have argued that the initiative does not go far enough in allowing abortion.

== Endorsements ==
Endorsements for Amendment G

Prominent Leaders

- Former U.S. Senator Tom Daschle (1987-2005) (Democrat)
- Donna Shalala, U.S. Representative from FL-27 (2019-2021)
- Jan Nicolai, former State Representative (1982–2000) and Chair of the House Appropriations Committee (1986–1996) (Republican)
- Rick Weiland, Official Sponsor of Amendment G

State Senators

- Stan Adelstein, former state senator from the 32nd district (2005-2007, 2009-2013) (Republican)
- Nancy Turbak Berry, former state senator from the 5th district (2006-2010) (Democrat)
- Reynold Nesiba, Minority Leader of the South Dakota Senate (2023–2025) and state senator from the 15th district (2017–2025) (Democrat)

State Representatives

- Linda Duba, state representative from the 15th district (2019–present) (Democrat)
- Oren Lesmeister, Minority Leader of the South Dakota House of Representatives (2023–2025) and state representative from the 28A district (2017–2025) (Democrat)
- Casey Murschel, former state representative from the 12th District (2001–2007) (Republican)

Organizations

- Dakotans for Health (initiative sponsor)
- Republicans for Freedom Amendment G Coalition
- South Dakota League of Women Voters
- Doctors for Freedom (group of physicians supporting Amendment G)
- Faith Leaders Freedom Coalition (group of Christian faith leaders from five denominations)
- Freedom From Religion Foundation
- South Dakota Advocacy Network for Women
Against Amendment G

Statewide officials

- Kristi Noem, 33rd Governor of South Dakota (2019–2025) (Republican)
- Mike Rounds, U.S. Senator from South Dakota (2015-present) (Republican)
- John Thune, U.S. Senator from South Dakota (2005-present) (Republican)

State Representatives

- Jon Hansen, state representative from the 25th district (2011-2013, 2019–present) (Republican)

Individuals

- Leslee Unruh, anti-abortion activist and co-chair of Life Defense Fund

Organizations

- Planned Parenthood North Central States
- Susan B. Anthony Pro-Life America
- Life Defense Fund
- American Civil Liberties Union (ACLU)
- South Dakota Right to Life (SDRTL)

== Polling ==
Poll source	Date(s) administered	Sample size	Margin of error	Yes	No	Undecided
Emerson College/Nexstar Media	October 19–22, 2024	825 (LV)	± 3.3%	45%	48%	7%
Mason-Dixon Polling & Strategy	May 10–13, 2024	500 (RV)	± 4.5%	53%	35%	11%
Mason-Dixon Polling & Strategy	November 27–29, 2023	500 (RV)	± 4.5%	46%	44%	11%

== Results ==
2024 South Dakota Amendment G
Choice	Votes	%
For	176,809	41.41
Against	250,136	58.59
Total	426,945	100.00
Source: Secretary of State of South Dakota

=== By county ===
County	No		Yes		Margin		Total
County	#	%	#	%	#	%	Total
Aurora	1,091	77.98%	308	22.02%	783	55.97%	1,399
Beadle	4,543	64.93%	2,454	35.07%	2,089	29.86%	6,997
Bennett	660	61.97%	405	38.03%	255	23.94%	1,065
Bon Homme	2,203	73.63%	789	26.37%	1,414	47.26%	2,992
Brookings	8,040	53.72%	6,927	46.28%	1,113	7.44%	14,967
Brown	9,990	58.83%	6,990	41.17%	3,000	17.67%	16,980
Brule	1,681	69.06%	753	30.94%	928	38.13%	2,434
Buffalo	231	50.66%	225	49.34%	6	1.32%	456
Butte	3,378	67.13%	1,654	32.87%	1,724	34.26%	5,032
Campbell	633	76.63%	193	23.37%	440	53.27%	826
Charles Mix	2,621	72.54%	992	27.46%	1,629	45.09%	3,613
Clark	1,329	73.22%	486	26.78%	843	46.45%	1,815
Clay	2,453	43.39%	3,201	56.61%	−748	−13.23%	5,654
Codington	8,451	63.17%	4,927	36.83%	3,524	26.34%	13,378
Corson	726	64.71%	396	35.29%	330	29.41%	1,122
Custer	3,658	61.51%	2,289	38.49%	1,369	23.02%	5,947
Davison	5,934	64.99%	3,197	35.01%	2,737	29.97%	9,131
Day	1,813	62.28%	1,098	37.72%	715	24.56%	2,911
Deuel	1,611	70.66%	669	29.34%	942	41.32%	2,280
Dewey	913	49.54%	930	50.46%	−17	−0.92%	1,843
Douglas	1,442	87.29%	210	12.71%	1,232	74.58%	1,652
Edmunds	1,581	77.61%	456	22.39%	1,125	55.23%	2,037
Fall River	2,744	64.66%	1,500	35.34%	1,244	29.31%	4,244
Faulk	914	80.67%	219	19.33%	695	61.34%	1,133
Grant	2,563	70.88%	1,053	29.12%	1,510	41.76%	3,616
Gregory	1,728	76.87%	520	23.13%	1,208	53.74%	2,248
Haakon	950	84.67%	172	15.33%	778	69.34%	1,122
Hamlin	2,474	76.76%	749	23.24%	1,725	53.52%	3,223
Hand	1,338	75.98%	423	24.02%	915	51.96%	1,761
Hanson	1,514	74.91%	507	25.09%	1,007	49.83%	2,021
Harding	666	82.32%	143	17.68%	523	64.65%	809
Hughes	4,912	57.75%	3,593	42.25%	1,319	15.51%	8,505
Hutchinson	2,937	78.76%	792	21.24%	2,145	57.52%	3,729
Hyde	522	74.89%	175	25.11%	347	49.78%	697
Jackson	766	68.58%	351	31.42%	415	37.15%	1,117
Jerauld	678	68.28%	315	31.72%	363	36.56%	993
Jones	432	78.12%	121	21.88%	311	56.24%	553
Kingsbury	1,906	68.02%	896	31.98%	1,010	36.05%	2,802
Lake	3,644	61.79%	2,253	38.21%	1,391	23.59%	5,897
Lawrence	8,187	53.56%	7,100	46.44%	1,087	7.11%	15,287
Lincoln	20,549	56.50%	15,823	43.50%	4,726	12.99%	36,372
Lyman	962	66.71%	480	33.29%	482	33.43%	1,442
Marshall	1,278	60.40%	838	39.60%	440	20.79%	2,116
McCook	2,207	72.27%	847	27.73%	1,360	44.53%	3,054
McPherson	1,034	80.28%	254	19.72%	780	60.56%	1,288
Meade	9,192	62.86%	5.430	37.14%	3,762	25.73%	14,622
Mellette	443	60.03%	295	39.97%	148	20.05%	738
Miner	827	72.04%	321	27.96%	506	44.08%	1,148
Minnehaha	47,920	51.23%	45,627	48.77%	2,293	2.45%	93,547
Moody	2,015	62.83%	1,192	37.17%	823	25.66%	3,207
Oglala Lakota	980	32.67%	2,020	67.33%	−1,040	−34.67%	3,000
Pennington	29,696	52.94%	26,400	47.06%	3,296	5.88%	56,096
Perkins	1,240	78.09%	348	21.91%	892	56.17%	1,588
Potter	973	75.37%	318	24.63%	655	50.74%	1,291
Roberts	2,431	59.29%	1,669	40.71%	762	18.59%	4,100
Sanborn	860	71.07%	350	28.93%	510	42.15%	1,210
Spink	2,081	66.74%	1,037	33.26%	1,044	33.48%	3,118
Stanley	1,090	62.93%	642	37.07%	448	25.87%	1,732
Sully	674	74.48%	231	25.52%	443	48.95%	905
Todd	810	38.39%	1,300	61.61%	−490	−23.22%	2,110
Tripp	2,024	75.86%	644	24.14%	1,380	51.72%	2,668
Turner	3,210	70.69%	1,331	29.31%	1,879	41.38%	4,541
Union	5,158	58.77%	3,619	41.23%	1,539	17.53%	8,777
Walworth	1,787	73.72%	637	26.28%	1,150	47.44%	2,424
Yankton	6,415	59.51%	4,364	40.49%	2,051	19.03%	10,779
Ziebach	423	53.95%	361	46.05%	62	7.91%	784
Totals	250,136	58.59%	176,809	41.41%	73,327	17.17%	426,945

== See also ==
- Abortion in South Dakota
- 2022 Kansas abortion referendum
- 2022 California Proposition 1
- 2022 Michigan Proposal 3
- 2022 Vermont Proposal 5
- November 2023 Ohio Issue 1
- 2024 Arizona Proposition 139
- 2024 Colorado Amendment 79
- 2024 Florida Amendment 4
- 2024 Maryland Question 1
- 2024 Missouri Amendment 3
- 2024 Montana Initiative 128
- 2024 Nebraska Initiative 439
- 2024 Nevada Question 6
- 2024 New York Proposal 1
- 2024 South Dakota Amendment H
- 2024 United States ballot measures
- 2026 Idaho Proposition 1
- 2026 Missouri Amendment 3
- 2026 Nevada Question 6
- 2026 Virginia Question 1
