= 2024 Arizona Proposition 139 =

Abortion rights referendum in Arizona

- November 5, 2024
- Right to Abortion Initiative

Results
Choice	Votes	%
Yes	2,000,287	61.61%
No	1,246,202	38.39%

Yes
50–60%
60–70%
70–80%
80–90%
90–100%
No
50–60%
60–70%
70–80%
80–90%
Tie/No Data
- 100% reporting as of Nov. 25, MST

Arizona Proposition 139 is a constitutional amendment that was approved by voters on November 5, 2024, establishing a right to abortion in the Constitution of Arizona until fetal viability.

== Background ==
Arizona's first ban on abortion was passed in 1864. It read:

[E]very person who shall administer, or cause to be administered or taken, any medicinal substances, or shall use or cause to be used any instruments whatever, with the intention to procure the miscarriage of any woman then being with child, and shall be thereof duly convicted, shall be punished by imprisonment in the Territorial prison for a term not less than two years, and nor more than five years: Provided, that no physician shall be affected by the last clause of this section, who, in the discharge of his professional duties, deems it necessary to produce the miscarriage of any woman in order to save her life.

This total abortion ban was invalidated in 1973 by Roe v. Wade, which recognized a constitutional right to abortion up to fetal viability. A trigger law, drafted to go into effect if Roe were overturned, was passed by the Arizona Legislature in 2022, banning abortion after the 15th week of pregnancy. Later that year, the Supreme Court of the United States ruled in Dobbs v. Jackson Women's Health Organization that Roe had been "wrongly decided". This, in turn, led to confusion over which of the two Arizona abortion laws should go into effect: Then-Governor Doug Ducey backed the 15-week ban, while then-Attorney General Mark Brnovich held that the older total ban should be operative.

In November 2022, Katie Hobbs and Kris Mayes, both supporters of abortion rights, were elected as Governor and Attorney General of Arizona, respectively; their election was seen as part of the so-called Dobbs effect backlash against the ruling. The next month, a state appeals court ruling found that the 2022 law should take precedence, allowing abortions up to 15 weeks to be performed in Arizona. In July 2023, Hobbs issued an executive order stripping local prosecutors of their ability to file prosecutions over the 15-week ban or (if it were revived in court) the 1864 ban, and assigning that power to Mayes, who, in turn, stated that she had no intention of ever filing such prosecutions.

On April 9, 2024, the Republican-controlled Arizona Supreme Court ruled in Planned Parenthood Arizona v. Mayes that the 1864 law could be enforced. However, on May 1, in the face of further backlash, the Arizona Legislature repealed the 1864 law, leaving the 15-week ban in place. Following the passage of Proposition 139 within the state's constitution, Kris Mayes formally paused the 15-week ban in December 2024. In March 2025, the ban was permanently blocked in state court, restoring the legal situation before the repeal of Roe. Further court challenges to expand legal grounds for abortion within the state were filed in May 2025.

== Content ==
The official ballot title was as follows:

PROPOSITION 139
PROPOSED BY INITIATIVE PETITION RELATING TO THE FUNDAMENTAL RIGHT TO AN ABORTION.

Official Title

AMENDING ARTICLE II, CONSTITUTION OF ARIZONA, BY ADDING SECTION 8.1; RELATING TO THE FUNDAMENTAL RIGHT TO AN ABORTION.

Descriptive Title

CREATES A FUNDAMENTAL RIGHT TO ABORTION. LIMITS THE STATE'S ABILITY TO INTERFERE WITH THAT RIGHT BEFORE FETAL VIABILITY. AFTER FETAL VIABILITY, ABORTIONS ARE ALLOWED WHEN NECESSARY TO PROTECT THE LIFE OR HEALTH OF THE PREGNANT INDIVIDUAL. PROHIBITS LAWS PENALIZING A PERSON FOR ASSISTING AN INDIVIDUAL OBTAINING AN ABORTION.

Once approved, the ballot measure added the following text to Article 2, Section 8.1, of the Arizona Constitution:

8.1. Fundamental right to abortion; definitions

A. Every individual has a fundamental right to abortion, and the state shall not enact, adopt, or enforce any law, regulation, policy, or practice that does any of the following:

1. Denies, restricts, or interferes with that right before fetal viability, unless justified by a compelling state interest that is achieved by the least restrictive means.

2. Denies, restricts, or interferes with an abortion after fetal viability that, in the good faith judgement of a treating health-care professional, is necessary to protect the life or physical or mental health of the pregnant individual.

3. Penalizes any individual or entity for aiding or assisting a pregnant individual in exercising the individual's right to abortion as provided in this section.

B. For the purposes of this section:

1. "Compelling state interest" means a law, regulation, policy, or practice that meets both of the following:

(a) Is enacted or adopted for the limited purpose of improving or maintaining the health of an individual seeking abortion care, consistent with accepted clinical standards of practice and evidence-based medicine.

(b) Does not infringe on that individual's autonomous decision-making.

2. "Fetal viability" means the point in pregnancy when, in the good-faith judgement of a treating health-care professional, and based on the particular facts of the case, there is a significant likelihood of the fetus's sustained survival outside the uterus, without the application of extraordinary medical measures.

3. "State" means this state, any agency of this state, or any political subdivision of this state.

== Endorsements ==
Yes

Executive branch officials

- Kamala Harris, former vice president of the United States (2021–2025) (Democratic)

U.S. senators

- Jacky Rosen, U.S. senator from Nevada (2019–present) (Democratic)

Statewide officials

- Katie Hobbs, governor of Arizona (2023–present) (Democratic)

Local officials

- Regina Romero, mayor of Tucson (2019–present) (Democratic)

Organizations

- Freedom From Religion Foundation

Political parties

- Arizona Working Families Party

== Polling ==
Poll source	Date(s) administered	Sample size (Note: Key: A – all adults RV – registered voters LV – likely voters V – unclear)	Margin of error	For	Against	Undecided
Noble Predictive 28	October 28–30, 2024	775 (LV)	± 3.5%	57%	33%	9% (Note: "I wouldn't vote on this measure" with 2%)
CBS News/YouGov	October 11–16, 2024	1,434 (RV)	± 3.3%	52%	33%	15%
Arizona's Family/High Ground	September 26–29, 2024	500 (LV)	± 4.38%	59%	27%	14%
Fox News	September 20–24, 2024	1,021 (RV)	± 3.0%	72%	26%	2%
New York Times/Siena College	September 17–21, 2024	713 (RV)	± 4.4%	58%	35%	7%
Fox News	August 23–26, 2024	1,014 (RV)	± 3.0%	73%	23%	4%
KFF	May 23 – June 5, 2024	3,192 (Female RV)	± 5%	67%	32%	0%
AARP	May 28 – June 4, 2024	600 (LV)	± 4.0%	59%	36%	5%
CBS News/YouGov	May 10–16, 2024	1510 (LV)	± 3.3%	65%	21%	14%
Noble Predictive Insights	May 7–14, 2024	1,003 (RV)	± 3.09%	41%	41%	18%

== See also ==
- 2022 Kansas abortion referendum
- 2022 California Proposition 1
- 2022 Michigan Proposal 3
- 2022 Vermont Proposal 5
- November 2023 Ohio Issue 1
- 2024 Colorado Amendment 79
- 2024 Florida Amendment 4
- 2024 Maryland Question 1
- 2024 Missouri Amendment 3
- 2024 Montana Initiative 128
- 2024 Nebraska Initiative 439
- 2024 Nevada Question 6
- 2024 New York Proposal 1
- 2024 South Dakota Amendment G
- 2024 United States ballot measures
- 2026 Idaho Proposition 1
- 2026 Missouri Amendment 3
- 2026 Nevada Question 6
- 2026 Virginia Question 1
