= 2024 Nevada Question 6 =

Proposed amendment to the Nevada Constitution

- November 5, 2024
- Right to Abortion Initiative

Results
Choice	Votes	%
Yes	905,170	64.36%
No	501,232	35.64%
County results
Yes
60–70%
50–60%
No
60–70%
50–60%

2024 Nevada Question 6 was a proposed constitutional amendment for the state of Nevada in the United States, that protected the right to an abortion until fetal viability, which is generally considered about 23 or 24 weeks, or when necessary to protect the life or health of the pregnant patient. It also permits any qualified health-care professional — including physicians, pharmacists, and others — to perform abortions.

The Question initially appeared on the November 5th, 2024, ballot in Nevada. The ballot measure was approved with 64.4% of the votes. As Question 6 was approved in 2024, a second vote will be held on November 3, 2026.

== Background ==
Abortion is currently legal in Nevada up to 24 weeks. Nevada Question 6 was placed on the ballot after the organization, Nevadans for Reproductive Freedom, collected the required number of signatures in June 2024. Voters must approve the ballot question in both 2024 and 2026 to amend the state constitution.

== Question 6 language ==
"Should the Nevada Constitution be amended to create an individual's fundamental right to an abortion, without interference by state or local governments, whenever the abortion is performed by a qualified health-care professional until fetal viability, or when necessary to protect the health or life of the pregnant individual at any point during the pregnancy?"

== Endorsements ==
Yes

Executive branch officials

- Kamala Harris, former Vice President of the United States (2021–2025) (Democratic)

U.S. senators

- Jacky Rosen, Nevada (2019–present) (Democratic)

U.S. representatives

- Steven Horsford, NV-04 (2013–2015, 2019–present) (Democratic)
- Susie Lee, NV-03 (2019–present) (Democratic)
- Alexandria Ocasio-Cortez, NY-14 (2019–present) (Democratic)
- Dina Titus, NV-01 (2013–present) (Democratic)

State legislators

- 4 state senators
- 17 state assemblymembers

Organizations

- ACLU of Nevada
- Feminist Majority Foundation
- Human Rights Campaign
- Indivisible Northern Nevada
- NAACP Las Vegas
- Planned Parenthood Votes Nevada
- Reproductive Freedom for All Nevada
- Center for Biological Diversity Action Fund

Newspapers

- Ms.
No

State legislators

- Ken Gray, state assemblymember from the 39th district (2022–present) (Republican)

== Polling ==
Poll source	Date(s) administered	Sample size (Note: Key: A – all adults RV – registered voters LV – likely voters V – unclear)	Margin of error	Yes	No	Don't Know/Refused
The New York Times	Oct. 24–Nov. 2, 2024	1,010 (LV)	± 3.4%	63%	33%	4%
Data for Progress	Oct. 25–30, 2024	721 (LV)	± 4%	66%	26%	8%
Emerson College	Oct. 5–8, 2024	900 (LV)	± 3.2%	55%	33%	13%
The Washington Post	Sept. 30–Oct. 15, 2024	652 (RV)	± 4.8%	80%	20%	0%
Fox News	Aug. 23–26, 2024	1,026 (RV)	± 3%	75%	21%	4%

== Results ==
Right to Abortion
Choice	Votes	%
For	905,170	64.36
Against	501,232	35.64
Total	1,406,402	100.00
Registered voters/turnout	1,929,972	48.85

=== By county ===
County	Yes		No		Margin		Total
County	#	%	#	%	#	%	Total
Carson City	17,588	58.41%	12,521	41.59%	5,067	16.82%	30,109
Churchill	6,371	48.70%	6,710	51.30%	-339	-2.60%	13,081
Clark	644,444	66.49%	324,747	33.51%	319,697	32.98%	969,191
Douglas	17,002	50.04%	16,973	49.96%	29	0.08%	33,975
Elko	10,360	48.75%	11,337	52.25%	-977	-4.50%	21,697
Esmeralda	194	43.60%	251	56.40%	-57	-12.80%	445
Eureka	409	41.27%	582	58.73%	-409	-17.46%	991
Humboldt	3,666	47.14%	4,111	52.86%	-445	-5.72%	7,777
Lander	1,226	46.00%	1,439	54.00%	-213	-8.00%	2,665
Lincoln	810	33.78%	1,588	66.22%	-778	-32.44%	2,398
Lyon	16,445	51.01%	15,745	48.99%	700	2.02%	32,190
Mineral	1,270	57.10%	954	42.90%	316	14.20%	2,224
Nye	13,613	51.73%	12,705	48.27%	908	3.46%	26,318
Pershing	972	43.71%	1,252	56.29%	-280	-54.94%	2,224
Storey	1,560	52.17%	1,430	47.83%	130	4.34%	2,990
Washoe	167,272	65.88%	86,629	34.22%	80,643	31.76%	253,901
White Pine	1,968	46.57%	2,258	53.43%	-290	-6.86%	4,226
Totals	905,170	64.36%	501,232	35.64%	403,938	28.72%	1,406,402

== See also ==
- Abortion in Nevada
- 2022 Kansas abortion referendum
- 2022 California Proposition 1
- 2022 Michigan Proposal 3
- 2022 Vermont Proposal 5
- November 2023 Ohio Issue 1
- 2024 Arizona Proposition 139
- 2024 Colorado Amendment 79
- 2024 Florida Amendment 4
- 2024 Maryland Question 1
- 2024 Missouri Amendment 3
- 2024 Montana Initiative 128
- 2024 Nebraska Initiative 439
- 2024 New York Proposal 1
- 2024 South Dakota Amendment G
- 2024 United States ballot measures
- 2026 Idaho Proposition 1
- 2026 Missouri Amendment 3
- 2026 Nevada Question 6
- 2026 Virginia Question 1
