= 2024 Missouri Amendment 3 =

Missouri Right to Reproductive Freedom Initiative

Constitutional Amendment 3
- November 5, 2024
- Right to Reproductive Freedom Initiative

Results
Choice	Votes	%
Yes	1,538,659	51.60%
No	1,443,022	48.40%

Yes
90–100%
80–90%
70–80%
60–70%
50–60%
No
90–100%
80–90%
70–80%
60–70%
50–60%
Other
Tie
No votes

2024 Missouri Constitutional Amendment 3, also known as the Right to Reproductive Freedom Initiative, was a constitutional amendment that appeared on the ballot on November 5, 2024. The initiative amended the Constitution of Missouri to legalize abortion in Missouri until fetal viability. On December 23, 2024, the measure amended the Missouri Constitution to provide the right for reproductive freedom, defined as "the right to make and carry out decisions about all matters relating to reproductive health care, including but not limited to prenatal care, childbirth, postpartum care, birth control, abortion, miscarriage care, and respectful birthing conditions." The amendment narrowly passed.

Per NBC News and CNN, the amendment received majority support in the counties of Boone (66.9%), Buchanan (50.4%), Clay (61.2%), Jackson (59%), Platte (62.3%), St. Charles (53.3%), and St. Louis (67.4%), as well as the independent city of St. Louis (82.9%). These were nearly the same exact counties that had voted for 2020 Missouri Amendment 2 to expand Medicaid under the Affordable Care Act, except Buchanan County voted for legal abortion but against Medicaid expansion, while Greene County voted against legal abortion but for Medicaid expansion.

Per the map, the amendment received majority support in Boone County, home to Columbia and the University of Missouri, as well as the Kansas City and Greater St. Louis metropolitan areas along the Missouri River. It was most strongly opposed in the Ozarks in southern Missouri.

Missouri was the first state to enforce its ban after Dobbs was decided. Abortion access was restored in Missouri in February 2025. Specifically, clinics started providing abortions again on February 15, 2025. In May 2025, Missouri lawmakers approved a proposed constitutional amendment that would, if approved by voters in the 2026 elections, reinstate the state's abortion ban with exceptions for rape and incest within 12 weeks of gestational age and enshrine the state’s ban on transgender healthcare for minors in the state constitution. The proposed amendment was defeated by 55.49% of voters on November 3, 2026, keeping the right to abortion in place.

== Background ==
On June 24, 2022, following the Supreme Court's ruling in Dobbs v. Jackson Women's Health Organization which overturned Roe v. Wade, Missouri's trigger law banning abortion went into effect, which banned all abortions except to save the life of the mother. On March 8, 2024, the group Missourians for Constitutional Freedom submitted Amendment 3 to the Missouri Secretary of State. On May 3, 2024, they gathered 380,159 signatures to place the amendment on the ballot in November. On August 13, 2024, the secretary of state's office announced 254,871 total valid signatures were submitted for the initiative. Sponsors of the measure hired Advanced Micro Targeting, eQual, MO Political Consulting and MOVE Action to collect signatures for the petition to qualify this measure for the ballot. A total of $4,037,757.84 was spent to collect the 171,592 valid signatures required to put this measure before voters, resulting in a total cost per required signature (CPRS) of $23.53.

During its journey to the ballot, Amendment 3 faced several roadblocks. A bill to increase the threshold required to approve constitutional amendments, including Amendment 3, was narrowly rejected by the Missouri General Assembly. Additionally, a lawsuit to remove Amendment 3 from the ballot was filed, but ultimately rejected by the Supreme Court of Missouri. Lawsuits regarding fair ballot language, cost estimate of amendment, and post-certification removal from the ballot.

Missouri Court Cases Related to 2024 Missouri Constitutional Amendment 3:

- ACLU v. Secretary of State Jay Ashcroft

- Fitz-James v. Bailey

== Amendment language ==
Official Ballot Title:

Do you want to amend the Missouri Constitution to:

- establish a right to make decisions about reproductive health care, including abortion and contraceptives, with any governmental interference of that right presumed invalid;
- remove Missouri’s ban on abortion;
- allow regulation of reproductive health care to improve or maintain the health of the patient;
- require the government not to discriminate, in government programs, funding, and other activities, against persons providing or obtaining reproductive health care; and
- allow abortion to be restricted or banned after Fetal Viability except to protect the life or health of the woman?

State governmental entities estimate no costs or savings, but unknown impact. Local governmental entities estimate costs of at least $51,000 annually in reduced tax revenues. Opponents estimate a potentially significant loss to state revenue.

Fair Ballot Language:

A “yes” vote establishes a constitutional right to make decisions about reproductive health care, including abortion and contraceptives, with any governmental interference of that right presumed invalid; removes Missouri's ban on abortion; allows regulation of reproductive health care to improve or maintain the health of the patient; requires the government not to discriminate, in government programs, funding, and other activities, against persons providing or obtaining reproductive health care; and allows abortion to be restricted or banned after Fetal Viability except to protect the life or health of the woman.

A “no” vote will continue the statutory prohibition of abortion in Missouri.

When passed, this measure may reduce local taxes while the impact to state taxes is unknown.

Notice: The proposed amendment revises Article I of the Constitution by adopting one new Section to be known as Article I, Section 36.

Be it resolved by the people of the state of Missouri that the Constitution be amended:

Section A. Article I of the Constitution is revised by adopting one new Section to be known as Article I, Section 36 to read as follows:

Section 36.

1. This Section shall be known as "The Right to Reproductive Freedom Initiative".
2. The Government shall not deny or infringe upon a person's fundamental right to reproductive freedom, which is the right to make and carry out decisions about all matters relating to reproductive health care, including, but not limited to, prenatal care, childbirth, postpartum care, birth control, abortion care, miscarriage care, and respectful birthing conditions.
3. The right to reproductive freedom shall not be denied, interfered with, delayed, or otherwise restricted, unless the Government demonstrates that such action is justified by a compelling governmental interest achieved by the least restrictive means. Any denial, interference, delay, or restriction of the right to reproductive freedom shall be presumed invalid. For purposes of this Section, a governmental interest is compelling only if it is for the limited purpose, and has the limited effect of improving or maintaining the health of a person seeking care, is consistent with widely accepted clinical standards of practice and evidence-based medicine, and does not infringe on that person's autonomous decision-making.
4. Notwithstanding subsection 3 of this Section, the general assembly may enact laws that regulate the provision of abortion after fetal viability, provided that under no circumstance shall the Government deny, interfere with, delay, or otherwise restrict an abortion that, in the good-faith judgment of a treating health care professional, is needed to protect the life or physical or mental health of the pregnant person.
5. No person shall be penalized, prosecuted, or otherwise subjected to adverse action based on their actual, potential, perceived, or alleged pregnancy outcomes, including, but not limited to, miscarriage, stillbirth, or abortion. Nor shall any person assisting a person in exercising their right to reproductive freedom with that person's consent be penalized, prosecuted, or otherwise subjected to adverse action for doing so.
6. The Government shall not discriminate against persons providing or obtaining reproductive health care or assisting another person in doing so.
7. If any provision of this Section or the application thereof to anyone or to any circumstance is held invalid, the remainder of those provisions and the application of such provisions to others or other circumstances shall not be affected thereby.
8. For purposes of this Section, the following terms mean:
  1. "Fetal Viability", the point in pregnancy when, in the good-faith judgment of a treating health care professional and based on the particular facts of the case, there is significant likelihood of the fetus's sustained survival outside the uterus without the application of extraordinary medical measures.
  2. "Government",
    1. the state of Missouri; or
    2. any municipality, city, town, village, township, district, authority, public subdivision, or public corporation having the power to tax or regulate, or any portion of two or more such entities within the state of Missouri.

== Polling ==
Poll source	Date(s) administered	Sample size (Note: Key: A – all adults RV – registered voters LV – likely voters V – unclear)	Margin of error	Yes	No	Undecided
Remington Research Group (Note: Poll sponsored by Missouri Scout)	October 2–3, 2024	753 (LV)	± 3.2%	46%	33%	21%
Emerson College	September 12–13, 2024	850 (LV)	± 3.3%	58%	30%	12%
Saint Louis University/YouGov	August 8–16, 2024	900 (LV)	± 3.8%	52%	34%	14%
Remington Research Group	May 8–9, 2024	684 (LV)	± 4.2%	36%	60%	4%
Saint Louis University/YouGov	February 14–26, 2024	899 (LV)	± 3.7%	44%	37%	19%
Remington Research Group	March 28–29, 2023	1,102 (LV)	± 3.0%	29%	37%	34%

== Results ==
Amendment 3
Choice	Votes	%
For	1,538,659	51.60
Against	1,443,022	48.40
Total	2,981,681	100.00
Source: Secretary of State of Missouri

=== By congressional district ===
Despite losing the state, "No" won five of eight congressional districts, with "Yes" winning the remaining three, including one that elected a Republican.

District	Yes	No	Representative
1st	78%	22%	Cori Bush
2nd	57%	43%	Ann Wagner
3rd	49%	51%	Blaine Luetkemeyer
4th	44%	56%	Mark Alford
5th	69%	31%	Emanuel Cleaver
6th	46%	54%	Sam Graves
7th	39%	61%	Eric Burlison
8th	36%	64%	Jason Smith

== Aftermath ==
Republican lawmakers of Missouri in May 2025 approved a future referendum (by November 2026 or sooner) on whether to repeal 2024 Missouri Amendment 3 and instead institute an abortion ban except in the cases of medical emergencies, fetal anomalies, rape or incest, with the abortions for rape and incest only to be legal within 12 weeks from the woman's last period, and only if the rape or incest are documented to have been reported to law enforcement. The proposed amendment was defeated by 55.49% of voters on November 3, 2026, keeping the right to abortion in place.

== See also ==
- Abortion in Missouri
- 2026 Missouri Amendment 3
- List of Missouri ballot measures
- 2022 Kansas abortion referendum
- 2022 California Proposition 1
- 2022 Michigan Proposal 3
- 2022 Vermont Proposal 5
- November 2023 Ohio Issue 1
- 2024 Arizona Proposition 139
- 2024 Colorado Amendment 79
- 2024 Florida Amendment 4
- 2024 Maryland Question 1
- 2024 Montana Initiative 128
- 2024 Nebraska Initiative 439
- 2024 Nevada Question 6
- 2024 New York Proposal 1
- 2024 South Dakota Amendment G
- 2024 United States ballot measures
- 2026 Idaho Proposition 1
- 2026 Nevada Question 6
- 2026 Virginia Question 1

== Notes ==
Partisan clients
