= 2022 Michigan Proposal 3 =

Proposal 3
- November 8, 2022
- Right to Reproductive Freedom Initiative

Results
| Choice | Votes | % |
|---|---|---|
| Yes | 2,482,382 | 56.66% |
| No | 1,898,906 | 43.34% |
| Total votes | 4,381,288 | 100.00% |

Yes
80–90%
70–80%
60–70%
50–60%
No
80–90%
70–80%
60–70%
50–60%
Tie

2022 Michigan Proposal 3 (also referred to as Proposal 22-3), the Right to Reproductive Freedom Initiative (also known as Reproductive Freedom for All), was a citizen-initiated proposed constitutional amendment in the state of Michigan, which was voted on as part of the 2022 Michigan elections. The amendment, which passed, codified reproductive rights, including access to abortion, in the Constitution of Michigan.

== Background ==
Following the Dobbs v. Jackson Women's Health Organization ruling which overturned Roe v. Wade, access to abortion in Michigan became regulated by a 1931 law which criminalized abortion except in cases where the mother's life was at risk. The law was ruled unconstitutional by Michigan Court of Claims Judge Elizabeth L. Gleicher, characterizing the law as a violation of due process; however, the case was appealed to the Michigan Supreme Court. Regardless of the outcome of that appeal, there was no clear constitutional protection for abortion access in Michigan, making further potential regulation of abortion access by the legislature possible.

The amendment was introduced to overturn the 1931 abortion ban and make the right to "reproductive freedom" explicit in the Michigan Constitution. The Reproductive Freedom For All ballot committee gathered 753,759 signatures for the constitutional amendment, the most ever gathered for a ballot measure in state history, and more than enough for it to be placed on the 2022 ballot. On August 31, the Board of State Canvassers, responsible for determining whether candidates and initiatives should be placed on the ballot, deadlocked 2–2, with challengers arguing that the initiative's wording was poorly spaced. On September 9, the Michigan Supreme Court ruled 5-2 that the initiative should be placed on the November ballot.

== Contents ==
The proposal appeared on the ballot as follows:

A proposal to amend the state constitution to establish new individual right to reproductive freedom, including right to make all decisions about pregnancy and abortion; allow state to regulate abortion in some cases; and forbid prosecution of individuals exercising established right

This proposed constitutional amendment would:

- Establish new individual right to reproductive freedom, including right to make and carry out all decisions about pregnancy, such as prenatal care, childbirth, postpartum care, contraception, sterilization, abortion, miscarriage management, and infertility;
- Allow state to regulate abortion after fetal viability, but not prohibit if medically needed to protect a patient’s life or physical or mental health;
- Forbid state discrimination in enforcement of this right; prohibit prosecution of an individual, or a person helping a pregnant individual, for exercising rights established by this amendment;
- Invalidate state laws conflicting with this amendment.

Should this proposal be adopted?

Restrictions on reproductive rights must be implemented in the "least restrictive means", and with a "compelling" interest.

The full text of the section that the proposal added to Article I of the state constitution is as follows:

Sec. 28. (1) Every individual has a fundamental right to reproductive freedom, which entails the right to make and effectuate decisions about all matters relating to pregnancy, including but not limited to prenatal care, childbirth, postpartum care, contraception, sterilization, abortion care, miscarriage management, and infertility care.

An individual’s right to reproductive freedom shall not be denied, burdened, nor infringed upon unless justified by a compelling state interest achieved by the least restrictive means.

Notwithstanding the above, the state may regulate the provision of abortion care after fetal viability, provided that in no circumstance shall the state prohibit an abortion that, in the professional judgment of an attending health care professional, is medically indicated to protect the life or physical or mental health of the pregnant individual.

(2) The state shall not discriminate in the protection or enforcement of this fundamental right.

(3) The state shall not penalize, prosecute, or otherwise take adverse action against an individual based on their actual, potential, perceived, or alleged pregnancy outcomes, including but not limited to miscarriage, stillbirth, or abortion. Nor shall the state penalize, prosecute, or otherwise take adverse action against someone for aiding or assisting a pregnant individual in exercising their right to reproductive freedom with their voluntary consent.

(4) For the purposes of this section:

A state interest is “compelling” only if it is for the limited purpose of protecting the health of an individual seeking care, consistent with accepted clinical standards of practice and evidence-based medicine, and does not infringe on that individual’s autonomous decision-making. “Fetal viability” means: the point in pregnancy when, in the professional judgment of an attending health care professional and based on the particular facts of the case, there is a significant likelihood of the fetus’s sustained survival outside the uterus without the application of extraordinary medical measures.

(5) This section shall be self-executing. Any provision of this section held invalid shall be severable from the remaining portions of this section.

== Arguments ==
=== Proponents of Proposal 3 ===
The proposal's main supporters, Reproductive Freedom for All, state that Proposal 3 would "ensure that all Michiganders have the right to safe and respectful care during birthing, everyone has the right to use temporary or permanent birth control, everyone has the right to continue or end a pregnancy pre-viability, and no one can be punished for having a miscarriage, stillbirth, or abortion".

=== Opponents of Proposal 3 ===
The proposal's main opponents, Citizens to Support MI Women and Children, have called Proposal 3 "extreme", arguing that it could invalidate 41 state laws related to abortion and other issues (including prostitution, statutory rape, and human cloning). They have argued that due to the right to reproductive freedom applying to "all individuals", that it would repeal the requirement for minors to receive parental consent in order to receive an abortion. The group also asserted that the proposal would allow any "attending health care professional" to perform an abortion (a definition under state law that includes athletic trainers and masseuses), and repeal safety standards and inspections of abortion clinics. University of Detroit Mercy associate law professor Michelle Richards argued that such issues could still be regulated under Proposal 3, as a compelling interest to protect the safety and welfare of residents.

Opponents of Proposal 3 claimed that the amendment would codify an "unlimited right to abortion" by allowing abortions up to the last week of pregnancy for any reason.

It was also argued by opponents that Proposal 3 would allow minors to receive puberty blockers, castration, or a hysterectomy without parental consent, under an interpretation of the proposal that classified these procedures as falling under "infertility" and "sterilization". Washtenaw County prosecuting attorney Eli Savit and University of Michigan constitutional law professor Leah Litman disputed the claim, citing that Proposal 3 specifically defines the right to "reproductive freedom" as being within the context of pregnancy, with no explicit references to other contexts such as transgender health care. The Michigan Supreme Court will have to rule on the precise effects of the amendment.

== Fundraising ==
Reproductive Freedom for All has received $44 million, mostly from groups such as the ACLU, Planned Parenthood, and NARAL and Sam Bankman-Fried. Meanwhile, the Citizens to Support MI Women and Children has raised almost $17 million from groups such as the Michigan Catholic Conference and Right to Life of Michigan. Both committees have spent millions of dollars on advertising, including on TV and digital ads.

== Polling ==
Opinion polls for the first few months before the referendum indicated significant majority support for the amendment. Its popularity waned from the initial summer backlash from the Dobbs decision, but nonetheless, the amendment had a clear lead in the polls throughout the campaign. Graphical summary

| Poll source | Date(s) administered | Sample size (Note: Key: A – all adults RV – registered voters LV – likely voters V – unclear) | Margin of error | For Proposal 3 | Against Proposal 3 | Undecided (Note: Some polling results do not add up to 100% due to rounding.) | Lead |
|---|---|---|---|---|---|---|---|
| Cygnal (R) | November 1–4, 2022 | 1,603 (LV) | ± 2.5% | 52% | 44% | 5% | 8% |
| Mitchell Research | November 3, 2022 | 658 (LV) | ± 3.8% | 51% | 46% | 3% (Note: "Don’t plan on voting on the proposal" with 3%) | 5% |
| Cygnal (R) | October 31 – November 2, 2022 | 1,754 (LV) | ± 2.3% | 52% | 43% | 5% | 9% |
| EPIC-MRA (Note: Commissioned by the Detroit Free Press) | October 28 – November 1, 2022 | 600 (LV) | ± 4.0% | 57% | 40% | 4% | 17% |
| Emerson College | October 28–31, 2022 | 900 (LV) | ± 3.2% | 51% | 42% | 7% | 9% |
| The Glengariff Group, Inc. (Note: Commissioned by WDIV-TV and The Detroit News) | October 26–28, 2022 | 600 (LV) | ± 4.0% | 55% | 41% | 4% | 14% |
| Mitchell Research | October 19, 2022 | 541 (LV) | ± 4.2% | 50% | 47% | 3% | 3% |
| CNN/SSRS | October 13–18, 2022 | 901 (RV) | ± 4.2% | 54% | 45% | 1% (Note: "No opinion" with 1%) | 9% |
| CNN/SSRS | October 13–18, 2022 | 651 (LV) | ± 4.9% | 54% | 45% | 2% (Note: "No opinion" with 2%) | 9% |
| Emerson College | October 12–14, 2022 | 580 (LV) | ± 4.0% | 52% | 38% | 10% | 14% |
| EPIC-MRA | October 6–12, 2022 | 600 (LV) | ± 4.0% | 60% | 33% | 7% | 27% |
| CBS News/YouGov | October 3–6, 2022 | 1,285 (RV) (Note: Poll conducted among 1,285 registered voters, question results from a subset of likely voters.) | ± 3.6% | 54% | 38% | 7% (Note: "Won’t vote on this proposal" with 7%) | 16% |
| The Glengariff Group, Inc. | September 26–29, 2022 | 600 (LV) | ± 4.0% | 62% | 24% | 14% | 38% |
| EPIC-MRA | September 15–19, 2022 | 600 (LV) | ± 4.0% | 64% | 27% | 9% | 37% |
| EPIC-MRA | September 7–13, 2022 | 800 (LV) | ± 3.5% | 56% | 23% | 21% | 33% |
| EPIC-MRA | August 18–23, 2022 | 600 (LV) | ± 4.0% | 67% | 24% | 9% | 43% |

== Results ==
Proposal 3 was approved with 56.66% of the vote. Among the factors contributing to the proposal's passage were the increased participation in the midterm election by younger voters, and a heightened involvement exhibited by non-activist Michiganders.

Proposal 3
| Choice | Votes | % |
|---|---|---|
| For | 2,482,382 | 56.66 |
| Against | 1,898,906 | 43.34 |
| Total | 4,381,288 | 100.00 |

Results by congressional district are shown below. "Yes" won nine of 13 congressional districts, including two that elected Republicans.

| Congressional district | Yes | | No | | Total votes | Representative |
| Congressional district | # | % | # | % | # | Name |
|---|---|---|---|---|---|---|
| District 1 | 190,678 | 49.2% | 197,133 | 50.8% | 387,811 | Jack Bergman |
| District 2 | 153,029 | 44.6% | 189,911 | 55.4% | 342,940 | John Moolenaar |
| District 3 | 188,644 | 55.8% | 149,562 | 44.2% | 338,206 | Hillary Scholten |
| District 4 | 174,564 | 51.5% | 164,312 | 48.5% | 338,876 | Bill Huizenga |
| District 5 | 146,014 | 46.3% | 169,428 | 53.7% | 315,442 | Tim Walberg |
| District 6 | 254,036 | 68.5% | 116,855 | 31.5% | 370,891 | Debbie Dingell |
| District 7 | 212,554 | 57.4% | 157,867 | 42.6% | 370,421 | Elissa Slotkin |
| District 8 | 186,899 | 56.2% | 145,546 | 43.8% | 332,445 | Dan Kildee |
| District 9 | 177,814 | 46.9% | 201,012 | 53.1% | 378,826 | Lisa McClain |
| District 10 | 185,349 | 57.6% | 136,305 | 42.4% | 321,654 | John James |
| District 11 | 246,413 | 66.9% | 121,644 | 33.1% | 368,057 | Haley Stevens |
| District 12 | 197,198 | 71.1% | 80,181 | 28.9% | 277,379 | Rashida Tlaib |
| District 13 | 170,943 | 72.1% | 66,155 | 27.9% | 237,098 | Shri Thanedar |
| Totals | 2,482,382 | 56.7% | 1,898,906 | 43.3% | 4,381,288 | 7D, 6R |
Source: Google Sheets

In the wake of the constitutional amendment's approval, the 1931 abortion law was repealed on April 5, 2023. The Reproductive Health Act, which repealed several abortion restrictions, was enacted on November 21, 2023. The act also repealed a Republican-passed 10-year-old law requiring a separate health insurance add-on for abortion coverage that critics called "rape insurance".

== Recount ==
The America Project, a Donald Trump-aligned organization, funded a partial recount of this proposal, as well as 2022 Michigan Proposal 2, despite their passage by wide margins. The recount was spearheaded by Jerome Jay Allen of the conservative group Election Integrity Fund and Force. The recount lasted two weeks, and added 116 "yes" votes and 7 "no" votes to the totals. This led to calls to tighten recount rules, to disallow, or make more expensive for those who request them, frivolous recounts with no chance of changing the vote outcome. On July 9, 2024, governor Gretchen Whitmer signed a bill that would restrict recounts to cases where there was a reasonable chance the election outcome could be flipped.

== See also ==
- Abortion in Michigan
- 2022 Kansas abortion referendum
- 2022 California Proposition 1 – Successful referendum on enshrining reproductive rights in the state constitution
- 2022 Montana Legislative Referendum 131
- November 2023 Ohio Issue 1 – Referendum to enshrine abortion and contraception in the state constitution
- 2022 Vermont Proposal 5
- 2024 Arizona Proposition 139
- 2024 Colorado Amendment 79
- 2024 Florida Amendment 4
- 2024 Maryland Question 1
- 2024 Missouri Amendment 3
- 2024 Montana Initiative 128
- 2024 Nebraska Initiative 439
- 2024 New York Proposal 1
- 2024 Nevada Question 6
- 2024 South Dakota Amendment G
- 2026 Idaho Proposition 1
- 2026 Missouri Amendment 3
- 2026 Nevada Question 6
- 2026 Virginia Question 1
- List of Michigan ballot measures
