= 2022 Kansas abortion referendum =

- August 2, 2022
- Should there be no Kansas constitutional right to abortion or to require the government funding of abortion, and reserve to the people of Kansas, through their elected state legislators, the right to pass laws to regulate abortion, including, but not limited to, in circumstances of pregnancy resulting from rape or incest, or when necessary to save the life of the mother?

Results
Choice	Votes	%
Yes	385,014	40.84%
No	557,837	59.16%
Total votes	942,851	100.00%
Registered voters/turnout	1,929,972	48.85%
- No: 50–60% 60–70% 70–80% 80–90% 90%+ Yes: 50–60% 60–70% 70–80% 80–90% 90%+ Tie: 50%

The 2022 Kansas abortion referendum was a rejected legislatively referred constitutional amendment to the Kansas Constitution that appeared on the ballot on August 2, 2022, alongside primary elections for statewide offices, with early voting from July 13. If enacted, the amendment would have declared that the Kansas Constitution does not guarantee a right to abortion, giving the Kansas state government power to prosecute individuals involved in abortions, and further declared that the Kansas government is not required to fund abortions.

On June 24, 2022, six weeks before the referendum, the Supreme Court's ruling in Dobbs v. Jackson Women's Health Organization overturned Roe v. Wade, allowing individual states to ban abortion. While the Kansas referendum had already been scheduled, the Dobbs decision greatly increased the impact of its results, both in terms of its potential effects and as a bellwether of voter sentiment about abortion bans. The amendment was ultimately defeated by an 18-point margin, which was partially attributed to higher-than-usual turnout and an increase in voter registration in the run-up to the referendum.

== Background ==
Abortion access protected by state law Abortion access protected via state constitution Abortion access protected via both state law and state Constitution No state level protections Abortion access prohibited by state Constitution Kansas is one of six states (including Alaska, Florida, Massachusetts, Minnesota and Montana) whose Supreme Court has recognized the right to abortion under its state Constitution. Iowa formerly recognized such a right, but its Supreme Court overruled this precedent in 2022.

In 2015, the state legislature passed the Kansas Unborn Child Protection from Dismemberment Abortion Act, which would prohibit dilation and evacuation abortions, which accounted for 9% of abortions in Kansas, with few exceptions, such as to preserve the life of the mother. In response, two abortion providers in Overland Park and others sued the state in the Shawnee County District Court, arguing that sections 1 and 2 of the constitution's Bill of Rights recognized a "fundamental right to abortion". The court agreed, blocking the law from taking into effect. As such, the state attorney general appealed the case, titled Hodes & Nauser v. Derek Schmidt, to the Kansas Court of Appeals. It issued a 7–7 decision in January 2016, effectively upholding the district court's decision. The state then appealed again to the state supreme court, with oral arguments heard in March 2017. It argued that the state constitution couldn't protect abortion rights since abortion was mostly illegal when it was drafted in 1859 and that physicians had other ways to perform second-trimester abortions. The court published its 6–1 ruling to affirm the lower courts' judgement on April 26, 2019, which stated that the first section of the state bill of rights in which "all men are possessed of equal and inalienable natural rights" include "a woman's right to make decisions about her body". The decision also stated that the right to abortion may only be infringed if "the State has a compelling interest, and has narrowly tailored its actions to that interest".

The proposed amendment was first introduced in the Legislature as House Concurrent Resolution 5019 and Senate Concurrent Resolution 1613 in mid-January 2020, nearly nine months after the ruling, which would be overruled by the amendment. Its title of "Value Them Both" refers to the amendment's opening line which laid out the supposed rationale behind it, i. e., to "value both women and children". It was modeled after a similar amendment to the Constitution of Tennessee which was also a reaction to a similar ruling by their Supreme Court. After vigorous protests from groups supporting and opposing the proposal, it failed in a vote in the Kansas House of Representatives, due to four Republicans voting against it. State representative Don Hineman, who voted against, said that the statewide vote should be held in November, and that his vote was not in contradiction to his "staunch pro-life record".

Almost exactly a year after its first introduction, the proposal was re-introduced as House Concurrent Resolution 5003. Several amendments were introduced to change the dates of which the referendum would be held. One of them was put forward by a Representative to move the date to August 2021, arguing that "5,460 babies will perish" between 2021 and 2022, while another was put forward by Democrats to move the date to coincide with general elections on Election Day 2022, as there were concerns that not doing so would suppress turnout and benefit the proposal's supporters, although the recent Dobbs v. Jackson Women's Health Organization case might also energize pro-choice voters. Ultimately, none of these amendments were successful and in late January 2021, the resolution passed both houses on party-line votes, surpassing the two-thirds threshold needed for a constitutional amendment to be put before the voters.

The language of the bill — in which a "yes" vote would remove constitutional protections for abortion in all instances — was described as being intentionally misleading, due to the unpopularity of blanket restrictions on abortion. It was put on the ballot through a house resolution passed in early 2021 with the goal of superseding a decision by the Kansas Supreme Court in 2019 that the state constitution protected a woman's access to abortion. Being the first abortion-related constitutional amendment on the ballot since the Supreme Court of the United States overturned the landmark Roe v. Wade decision in Dobbs v. Jackson Women's Health Organization, it was considered a bellwether over Americans' view on abortion. The Kansas referendum was also viewed as significant because neighboring states (such as Missouri and Oklahoma) are Republican-leaning and are more restrictive on abortion access. The referendum was the first of five abortion-related ballot measures in the U.S. in 2022: the others were held on Election Day for the general election (November 8) in California, Kentucky, Michigan, Montana, and Vermont. Because of this, the referendum was covered by media outlets worldwide.

Supporters called their proposal the Value Them Both Amendment, and it was referred to as such in the "explanatory statement" as such on the ballot (on which the referendum appeared under the title "Question Submitted: Constitutional Amendment"). The referendum was also referred to as Amendment 2. The leading organization in favor of the measure's passage was the Value Them Both Association, an umbrella group of anti-abortion organizations. The Catholic dioceses in Kansas and many evangelical Christian groups also supported the measure. The leading group against the measure was Kansans for Constitutional Freedom. Its passage would also be detrimental to the future of abortion in Kansas as Republicans could use its two-thirds supermajority to override a veto by Laura Kelly, the Democratic governor of Kansas, of an abortion ban or restriction that would be illegal under the 2019 state supreme court case. Saying that she opposed legislation that "interfered with a [woman's freedom]" to make "reproductive healthcare decisions [with] her physician", Kelly had faced a challenge in the concurrent gubernatorial election by Derek Schmidt, the Republican Attorney General who praised the overturn of Roe v. Wade and defended the state in the state court case. Had the ballot measure passed, and had Schmidt won the election, Republicans would theoretically only need a simple majority to pass such legislation.

== Content ==
The proposal would add a section to the Kansas Bill of Rights as follows:

§ 22. Regulation of abortion.

Because Kansans value both women and children, the constitution of the state of Kansas does not require government funding of abortion, and does not create or secure a right to abortion. To the extent permitted by the constitution of the United States, the people, through their elected state representatives and state senators, may pass laws regarding abortion, including, but not limited to, laws that account for circumstances of pregnancy resulting from rape or incest, or circumstances of necessity to save the life of the mother.

In addition to the proposed amendment, the house resolution also added an explanatory statement to the ballot paper as follows:

The Value Them Both Amendment would affirm there is no Kansas constitutional right to abortion or to require the government funding of abortion, and would reserve to the people of Kansas, through their elected state legislators, the right to pass laws to regulate abortion, including, but not limited to, in circumstances of pregnancy resulting from rape or incest, or when necessary to save the life of the mother.

A vote for the Value Them Both Amendment would affirm there is no Kansas constitutional right to abortion or to require the government funding of abortion, and would reserve to the people of Kansas, through their elected state legislators, the right to pass laws to regulate abortion.

A vote against the Value Them Both Amendment would make no changes to the constitution of the state of Kansas, and could restrict the people, through their elected state legislators, from regulating abortion by leaving in place the recently recognized right to abortion.

If enacted, the amendment stated that the Kansas Constitution does not guarantee a right to abortion in any circumstance, including in cases that involve protecting the health or life of the mother, incest, or rape, and would give the Kansas state government the power to prosecute pregnant women and doctors involved in abortions, including those that arose out of circumstances of "rape or incest, or circumstances of necessity to save the life of the mother". The bill additionally stated that the government of Kansas is not required to fund abortion.

== Arguments ==
In an effort to appeal to the broader electorate, both sides of the debate tried to paint their preferred choice as more moderate than the opposite side.

Supporters of the "yes" vote said that the amendment would give voters the ability "to weigh in directly on the ballot so that we can pass [abortion] laws". They have also claimed that the amendment would allow for "common sense abortion limits", and said that the Hodes & Nauser v. Schmidt case, which protected the right to abortion, needed to be overruled, since it could be used to nullify existing abortion restrictions in Kansas, such as a ban on most abortions after 22 weeks and a requirement for parental consent.

Meanwhile, supporters of the "no" vote", i.e. opponents of the amendment, and legal experts said that, while the language of the amendment did not specifically reference an abortion ban, state legislators would be empowered to pass such legislation, and would likely do so. They pointed to similar bills that have already been considered and introduced in the Legislature, such as HB 2746, introduced in March 2022, which would ban all abortions except "when necessary to preserve the life of the pregnant woman", without exceptions for rape and incest, and would make performing abortions a level one felony. State representative Lindsay Vaughn also added that the right to abortion is a non-negotiable human right that should not be up for a popular vote.

Many commentators, on both sides of the issue, brought up the history of Kansas as a free state with respect to the issue of slavery in the United States.

== Campaign spending ==
Opponents and proponents of the measure collectively spent $22 million on the referendum campaign. Abortion rights groups spent $11.3 million, while abortion opponents spent almost $11.1 million. Of the funding in support of the proposed amendment, more than $4.3 million was contributed by Roman Catholic dioceses and the Kansas Catholic Conference. Kansans for Life reported spending $2.7 million (split between its own efforts and its contribution to the main "vote yes" organization), and Susan B. Anthony Pro-Life America reported spending $1.4 million. Of the funding opposing the proposed amendment, Planned Parenthood affiliates and other abortion-rights organizations contributed nearly $2.3 million; approximately $1.5 million was contributed by Sixteen Thirty Fund, and $1.25 million was contributed by Michael Bloomberg.

== Polling ==
Poll source	Date(s) administered	Sample size (Note: Key: A – all adults RV – registered voters LV – likely voters V – unclear)	Margin of error	For Amendment 2	Against Amendment 2	Undecided
co/efficient (R)	July 17–18, 2022	1,557 (LV)	± 2.8%	47%	43%	10%

== Results ==
Value Them Both Amendment
Choice	Votes	%
For	385,014	40.84
Against	557,837	59.16
Total	942,851	100.00
Registered voters/turnout	1,929,972	48.85
Source: Secretary of State of Kansas

=== By congressional district ===
"No" won all four congressional districts, including three that were represented by Republicans.

District	No	Yes	Representative
1st	53.0%	47.0%	Tracey Mann
2nd	58.4%	41.6%	Jake LaTurner
3rd	67.5%	32.5%	Sharice Davids
4th	55.1%	44.9%	Ron Estes

== Aftermath ==
=== Reactions ===
Roger Marshall, the US senator for Kansas, criticized the results after the vote, citing his Christian faith:

While I don't have an answer, I do know that God works all things for good for those who trust him. I want to thank everybody in the pro-life community who worked so hard to get this amendment passed. Tonight, we must still go to bed with faith and hope, for tomorrow we must be as dedicated to the sanctity of life, and to the fight to protect the lives of moms and unborn babies. Each of us will have to pray and look in our hearts to see what's next.

Meanwhile, on the same day as the referendum, President Joe Biden released a statement praising the measure's defeat, while criticizing the US Supreme Court for overturning Roe v. Wade, saying:

The Supreme Court's extreme decision to overturn Roe v. Wade put women's health and lives at risk. Tonight, the American people had something to say about it. Voters in Kansas turned out in record numbers to reject extreme efforts to amend the state constitution to take away a woman's right to choose and open the door for a state-wide ban. This vote makes clear what we know: the majority of Americans agree that women should have access to abortion and should have the right to make their own health care decisions.

In response to the referendum results, several national Democratic Party leaders, including Senators Elizabeth Warren and Brian Schatz, argued that the party's candidates should emphasize reproductive rights in the 2022 midterm elections.

=== Analysis ===
Analysts noted that the "No" option outperformed Biden's vote share in the 2020 presidential election in every county, and won in several suburban counties where Trump had won a majority in 2020.

There had been initial fears that holding a referendum alongside statewide primaries (rather than the general election) would suppress turnout, but this ultimately did not happen. The Topeka Capital-Journal reported that Democratic primaries were less contentious, and many Democratic candidates ran unopposed, meaning that Democrats would otherwise be unlikely to vote in the primaries. The turnout of nearly 50% exceeded a 36% turnout predicted by Secretary of State Scott Schwab a few days before the referendum, extrapolating from factors such as past turnout data. He also acknowledged that the ballot measure "has increased voter interest in the election". The turnout rate was nearly double that in the 2018 primary election, and nearly two-thirds of that in the 2020 general election. Voter turnout set a Kansas record for primary elections, with the referendum increasing political mobilization.

Sarah Smarsh, writing in The New York Times after the measure was defeated, argued that "Kansas remains a beacon of liberty within the region", consistent with its history of being a "Free state" and extending women's suffrage before the Nineteenth Amendment to the United States Constitution required that. The term "Free-stater" has particular resonance in Kansas due to the history of conflict over slavery there.

A 2024 study in American Politics Research found that the referendum, which took place alongside a primary election, "mobilized an electorate that had more women and young people, fewer Republicans, and more first-time voters than a normal primary".

== See also ==
- Abortion in Kansas
- 2022 California Proposition 1
- 2022 Michigan Proposal 3
- 2022 Kentucky Amendment 2
- 2022 Vermont Proposal 5
- 2022 Montana Legislative Referendum 131
- November 2023 Ohio Issue 1
- 2024 Arizona Proposition 139
- 2024 Colorado Amendment 79
- 2024 Florida Amendment 4
- 2024 Maryland Question 1
- 2024 Missouri Amendment 3
- 2024 Montana Initiative 128
- 2024 Nebraska Initiative 439
- 2024 Nevada Question 6
- 2024 New York Proposal 1
- 2024 South Dakota Amendment G
- 2026 Idaho Proposition 1
- 2026 Missouri Amendment 3
- 2026 Nevada Question 6
- 2026 Virginia Question 1
