= 2024 New York Proposal 1 =

New York state constitutional amendment extending rights protections

- November 5, 2024
- Amendment to Protect Against Unequal Treatment

Results
Choice	Votes	%
Yes	4,757,097	62.47%
No	2,857,663	37.53%
Valid votes	7,614,760	90.99%
Invalid or blank votes	754,403	9.01%
Total votes	8,369,163	100.00%
Registered voters/turnout	12,426,602	67.35%
County results
Yes
80–90%
70–80%
60–70%
50–60%
No
60–70%
50–60%

New York Proposal 1 was a 2024 ballot proposal for a legislatively referred constitutional amendment to the New York Constitution called the Amendment to Protect Against Unequal Treatment, and informally known as the Equal Rights Amendment. It includes several rights in the New York State Constitution's Equal Protection Clause, with its chief purpose to preserve the right to abortion. It also adds a prohibition of discrimination on attributes such as ethnicity, age, sexual orientation, gender identity, disability, or reproductive autonomy.

The amendment was approved in consecutive legislating sessions in 2022 and 2023. While the text of the amendment was determined by the legislature, the wording of the ballot proposal about the amendment went through several changes and legal challenges before the Board of Elections' draft was replaced by an Albany County Judge. In the leadup to the election, the proposal was the subject of misinformation, with false claims that it would facilitate voting by undocumented immigrants or enable children to receive gender-affirming care without parental involvement.

The proposal was approved by voters in a referendum on November 5, 2024, with 56.84% in support, 34.15% opposed, and 9.01% of votes blank or invalid. When removing the blank and invalid votes, the proposal passed with 62.47% in support and 37.53% opposed. The proposal took effect on January 1, 2025.

== Content ==
The amendment, also known as the Equal Rights Amendment, expands the Constitution of New York's Equal Protection Clause, which is limited to protecting people from denial of rights on the basis of "race, color, creed, or religion". The full text of the proposal is:

Adds anti-discrimination provisions to State Constitution. Covers ethnicity, national origin, age, disability, and sex, including sexual orientation, gender identity and pregnancy. Also covers reproductive health care and autonomy.

It modified section 11 of article 1 of the state constitution this way (removals struck, additions underlined):

§ 11. a. No person shall be denied the equal protection of the laws of this state or any subdivision thereof. No person shall, because of race, color, ethnicity, national origin, age, disability, creed ~~or~~, religion, or sex, including sexual orientation, gender identity, gender expression, pregnancy, pregnancy outcomes, and reproductive health care and autonomy, be subjected to any discrimination in ~~his or her~~ their civil rights by any other person or by any firm, corporation, or institution, or by the state or any agency or subdivision of the state, pursuant to law.
b. Nothing in this section shall invalidate or prevent the adoption of any law, regulation, program, or practice that is designed to prevent or dismantle discrimination on the basis of a characteristic listed in this section, nor shall any characteristic listed in this section be interpreted to interfere with, limit, or deny the civil rights of any person based upon any other characteristic identified in this section.

=== Effects ===
The amendment expands the state constitution's protections against discrimination, including ethnicity, national origin, age, disability, sex (including sexual orientation, gender identity, and gender expression), pregnancy and pregnancy related outcomes, and reproductive healthcare and autonomy. By including protections related to pregnancy outcomes and reproductive healthcare, the amendment enshrines the right to abortion and other reproductive services into the state constitution. This constitutional protection makes it more challenging for future legislatures to enact laws that would restrict access to these services. The explicit inclusion of sexual orientation, gender identity, and gender expression strengthens legal protections for LGBTQ+ individuals. This change is intended to prevent discrimination in areas such as employment, housing, and public accommodations.

== History ==
In January 2017, New York Governor Andrew Cuomo called for the right to abortion to be enshrined into the New York Constitution. In 2019, Cuomo again called for a conditional amendment to protect abortion rights in the state at an event with Hillary Clinton at Barnard College, after the Democratic Party took back control of the New York State Senate in the 2018 election, and shortly before the passage of the Reproductive Health Act.

To amend the constitution in New York, the state legislature must pass the amendment twice in separate legislative sessions. Only at that point do citizens vote on its approval. On July 1, 2022, shortly after the overturning of Roe v. Wade, the New York Senate passed the resolution in favor of the amendment by a vote of 49–14, then the New York Assembly also adopted it by a vote of 98–43. On January 24, 2023, in the following legislative session, the New York Senate again passed it by a vote of 43-20 and the New York Assembly again passed it by a vote of 97–46, therefore allowing the referendum to take place.

On May 7, 2024, Livingston County Supreme Court justice Daniel J. Doyle ruled that the referendum cannot take place, since the New York Attorney General issued an opinion of the proposed amendment after lawmakers voted on it, rather than before. New York Governor Kathy Hochul stated that the referendum will still take place in November 2024. On June 18, 2024, the New York State Appellate Court put the referendum back on the ballot.

=== Proposal wording changes ===
In 2023, when the amendment had already been passed, state legislature passed a law to require ballot questions to be written at an eighth-grade reading level. When the bipartisan State Board of Elections (BOE) set out to develop the wording, they could not come to an agreement. The Democrats, who wanted to make sure to meet the deadline, agreed to the wording Republicans proposed, written at a college reading level and omitting the terms "abortion" and "LGBT". Board commissioners admitted at the time that it probably violated the "plain language" law. The attorney general's office proposed a new version, and when the BOE was subsequently sued by voters, they sought to require the board to adopt the attorney general's language.

The attorney general's proposed language was:

Protects against unequal treatment by New York and local governments no matter your sex, age, disability status, ethnicity, or national origin. Protects LGBT and pregnant people. Protects abortion.

When ruling on the case, Albany County Judge David Weinstein simply decided to implement his own version of the proposal, against the wishes of either side's lawyers and bypassing the BOE. Absent an appeal, that is the version which appears on the ballot.

== Analysis ==
New York already has several anti-discrimination laws, and the amendment does not create any new rights. By proposing to add rights to the State Constitution, rather than existing only in laws that can be overturned by legislators, it aims to make those rights more difficult to take away if the balance of power in state government were to change. According to Cornell University constitutional law professor Michael C. Dorf, the amendment would protect the right to abortion in the state of New York by ensuring that prohibiting abortion would be an unconstitutional form of health-care discrimination because they would be "singling out one form of reproductive health care, and not other kinds of health care". While several parties have been critical of the final draft excluding the word "abortion" in its text, other advocates argue doing so helps to preserve rights of woman for all pregnancy outcomes, as well as for in vitro fertilization and contraception.

According to The New York Times, the debate over Proposal 1 "has been rife with misinformation". Regarding gender, the proposal does not affect parental rights or parents' role in their children's health-care decisions, such as gender-affirming care. It also does not affect the law regarding participation in sports; transgender women have been permitted to participate in women's sports in New York since 2019. On the subject of immigration, the proposal does not affect existing immigration laws, and does not change state requirements to vote, contrary to false claims that the proposal would make it easier for undocumented immigrants to vote. Hell Gate NYC said many of the arguments against the proposal were "lies, plain and simple", highlighting a quote by Elise Stefanik which included several of them: "Proposition 1 would give our hard earned NY taxpayer dollars to illegals, fund sex change operations for minors without parental consent, and force schools to allow men and boys in women and girls sports and bathrooms".

== Support and opposition ==
The amendment was supported by a number of Democratic politicians in the state, including Governor Kathy Hochul, U.S. Sen. Kirsten Gillibrand, and House Minority Leader Hakeem Jeffries. It was supported by the NAACP, the New York Civil Liberties Union, and Planned Parenthood. Supporters argued that the amendment would help protect reproductive rights, and would help reduce discrimination in the state. A campaign in support of the amendment, titled "New Yorkers for Equal Rights", was launched in June 2023. Jeffries and Hochul pledged to raise over $20 million for the campaign, but did not reach that amount and New Yorkers for Equal Rights was criticized for using most of its money to pay for consultants.

The New York Republican State Committee and the New York Catholic Conference opposed the amendment. Republican state senator George Borrello and state assemblyman Christopher Tague spoke out against it on religious grounds. Former congressman Lee Zeldin campaigned against the bill, calling it an "attack on women's rights and girls' rights". With the majority of New Yorkers in favor of protecting abortion rights, many opponents focused on transgender issues, suggesting that including age among anti-discrimination provisions would give children the same power as parents. The Coalition to Protect Kids, which was primarily funded by an anti-abortion activist, formed to defeat the proposal; the Coalition referred to Proposal 1 as the "Parent Replacement Act". A small number of wealthy donors provided millions to campaigns opposing the proposal. Shortly before election day, Richard Uihlein gave $6.5 million to a political action committee (PAC), Vote No on Prop 1, to oppose the amendment. The PAC-funded advertisements falsely claiming the amendment would give undocumented immigrants the right to vote.

The wording of the proposal received criticism from multiple perspectives. An opinion piece in the National Review called the language "vague and all-encompassing", arguing that it provided too much latitude to future progressive litigants. Hell Gate NYC called the language "a bland gruel of obfuscation", blaming Republicans for producing language which fails New York's "plain language" law and subsequently led to the version installed by Weinstein.

== Opinion polls ==
Poll source	Date(s) administered	Sample size (Note: Key: A – all adults; RV – registered voters; LV – likely voters; V – unclear)	Margin of error	For	Against	Don't know/refused/won't vote
Siena College Research Institute	October 13–17, 2024	872 (LV)	± 4.1%	69%	22%	9%
Siena College Research Institute	September 11–16, 2024	1,003 (LV)	± 4.3%	64%	23%	13%
Siena College Research Institute	July 12–13 & 16–17, 2024	805 (RV)	± 4.1%	59%	27%	15%
Siena College Research Institute	May 13–15, 2024	1,191 (RV)	± 3.9%	59%	26%	15%

== Results ==
On November 5, 2024, at 9:00 PM ET, polls in New York closed. On the same night, at 9:31 PM PT, the Associated Press projected the passage of Proposal 1. According to the certified results from the New York Board of Elections, the proposal passed with 62.47% in support and 37.53% opposed. 732,834 voters left their ballot blank and 21,569 votes were invalidated. According to The New York Times, although the proposal faced right-wing opposition, it succeeded in several counties where voters otherwise voted for Donald Trump, the Republican presidential candidate. The constitution was amended on January 1, 2025.

Results by county
County	Yes #	Yes %	No #	No %	Margin #	Margin %	Blank	Invalid votes	Valid votes
Albany	92,489	64.38%	51,167	35.62%	41,322	28.76%	7,175	41	143,656
Allegany	6,789	35.73%	12,210	64.27%	-5,421	-28.54%	670	0	18,999
Bronx	266,970	83.31%	53,487	16.69%	213,483	66.62%	46,072	817	320,457
Broome	48,041	56.44%	37,073	43.56%	10,968	12.88%	6,455	38	85,114
Cattaraugus	12,920	40.55%	18,944	59.45%	-6,024	-18.90%	2,605	10	31,864
Cayuga	17,489	49.46%	17,873	50.54%	-384	-1.08%	1,378	5	35,362
Chautauqua	24,156	43.86%	30,922	56.14%	-6,766	-12.28%	2,317	15	55,078
Chemung	18,648	52.25%	17,039	47.75%	1,609	4.50%	2,229	8	35,687
Chenango	8,789	43.50%	11,417	56.50%	-2,628	-13.00%	2,523	10	20,206
Clinton	20,289	58.64%	14,310	41.36%	5,979	17.28%	1,633	6	34,599
Columbia	21,109	60.64%	13,704	39.36%	7,405	21.28%	1,366	1	34,813
Cortland	11,038	52.61%	9,941	47.39%	1,097	5.22%	1,351	0	20,979
Delaware	10,420	47.06%	11,724	52.94%	-1,304	-5.88%	1,255	2	22,144
Dutchess	84,497	57.62%	62,143	42.38%	22,354	15.24%	7,361	37	146,640
Erie	241,010	56.41%	186,248	43.59%	54,762	12.82%	34,341	189	427,258
Essex	9,886	53.93%	8,446	46.07%	1,440	7.86%	1,194	3	18,332
Franklin	9,417	51.54%	8,853	48.46%	564	3.08%	1,313	7	18,270
Fulton	9,157	40.50%	13,455	59.50%	-4,298	-19.00%	1,544	2	22,612
Genesee	10,481	38.05%	17,066	61.95%	-6,585	-23.90%	1,265	9	27,547
Greene	11,147	46.12%	13,024	53.88%	-1,877	-7.66%	1,437	1	24,171
Hamilton	1,249	38.97%	1,956	61.03%	-707	-22.06%	237	0	3,205
Herkimer	11,746	43.03%	15,550	56.97%	-3,804	-13.94%	1,718	10	27,296
Jefferson	18,481	45.19%	22,413	54.81%	-3,932	-9.62%	2,296	12	40,894
Kings	567,108	79.16%	149,304	20.84%	417,804	58.32%	140,927	4,571	716,412
Lewis	4,154	32.49%	8,632	67.51%	-4,478	-35.02%	459	1	12,786
Livingston	12,850	42.37%	17,478	57.63%	-4,628	-15.26%	1,078	2	30,328
Madison	16,673	50.37%	16,429	49.63%	244	0.74%	1,158	5	33,102
Monroe	201,615	58.35%	143,932	41.65%	57,683	16.70%	21,762	57	345,547
Montgomery	8,124	42.26%	11,098	57.74%	-2,974	-15.48%	1,690	10	19,222
Nassau	364,431	55.70%	289,785	44.30%	74,646	11.40%	65,545	575	654,216
New York	515,395	85.96%	84,146	14.04%	431,249	71.92%	56,296	10,762	599,541
Niagara	47,499	48.39%	50,668	51.61%	-3,169	-3.22%	5,042	17	98,167
Oneida	47,050	49.24%	48,509	50.76%	-1,459	-1.52%	5,764	19	95,559
Onondaga	133,324	63.15%	77,805	36.85%	55,519	26.30%	20,481	97	211,129
Ontario	29,085	50.08%	28,992	49.92%	93	0.16%	2,731	6	58,077
Orange	82,482	51.22%	78,563	48.78%	3,919	2.44%	17,156	34	161,045
Orleans	5,947	35.41%	10,846	64.59%	-4,899	-29.18%	1,506	2	16,793
Oswego	24,168	46.49%	27,818	53.51%	-3,650	-7.02%	2,628	14	51,986
Otsego	14,577	53.62%	12,609	46.38%	1,968	7.24%	1,469	23	27,186
Putnam	26,140	49.88%	26,269	50.12%	-129	-0.24%	4,003	9	52,409
Queens	469,504	74.78%	158,314	25.22%	311,190	49.56%	91,124	2,995	627,818
Rensselaer	39,093	53.39%	34,133	46.61%	4,960	6.78%	6,370	16	73,226
Richmond	92,497	50.62%	90,223	49.38%	2,274	1.24%	18,417	447	182,720
Rockland	66,515	49.33%	68,332	50.67%	-1,817	-1.34%	16,379	77	134,847
St. Lawrence	18,615	45.33%	22,453	54.67%	-3,838	-9.34%	3,481	0	41,068
Saratoga	67,678	53.80%	58,124	46.20%	9,554	7.60%	7,005	10	125,802
Schenectady	41,143	58.74%	28,902	41.26%	12,241	17.48%	3,055	12	70,045
Schoharie	6,490	41.85%	9,019	58.15%	-2,529	-16.30%	698	1	15,509
Schuyler	4,358	46.74%	4,965	53.26%	-607	-6.52%	236	3	9,323
Seneca	7,017	47.93%	7,623	52.07%	-606	-4.14%	586	1	14,640
Steuben	17,507	39.90%	26,371	60.10%	-8,864	-20.20%	1,854	90	43,878
Suffolk	391,069	54.14%	331,228	45.86%	59,841	8.28%	46,860	403	722,297
Sullivan	16,174	50.01%	16,167	49.99%	7	0.02%	3,225	7	32,341
Tioga	11,404	47.27%	12,719	52.73%	-1,315	-5.46%	687	2	24,123
Tompkins	33,376	76.67%	10,156	23.33%	23,220	53.34%	3,140	5	43,532
Ulster	59,762	63.26%	34,710	36.74%	25,052	26.52%	5,521	31	94,472
Warren	17,117	48.89%	17,897	51.11%	-780	-2.22%	1,297	7	35,014
Washington	12,572	45.59%	15,002	54.41%	-2,430	-8.82%	1,262	19	27,574
Wayne	18,159	41.86%	25,225	58.14%	-7,066	-16.28%	1,625	6	43,384
Westchester	290,369	68.26%	135,007	31.74%	155,362	36.52%	39,605	0	425,376
Wyoming	5,639	30.20%	13,031	69.80%	-7,392	-39.60%	741	4	18,670
Yates	4,199	40.32%	6,214	59.68%	-2,015	-19.36%	236	6	10,413
Totals	4,757,097	62.47%	2,857,663	37.53%	1,899,434	24.94%	732,834	21,569	7,614,760

== See also ==
- Abortion in New York
- 2022 Kansas abortion referendum
- 2022 California Proposition 1
- 2022 Michigan Proposal 3
- 2022 Vermont Proposal 5
- November 2023 Ohio Issue 1
- 2024 Arizona Proposition 139
- 2024 Colorado Amendment 79
- 2024 Florida Amendment 4
- 2024 Maryland Question 1
- 2024 Missouri Amendment 3
- 2024 Montana Initiative 128
- 2024 Nebraska Initiative 439
- 2024 Nevada Question 6
- 2024 South Dakota Amendment G
- 2024 United States ballot measures
- 2026 Idaho Proposition 1
- 2026 Missouri Amendment 3
- 2026 Nevada Question 6
- 2026 Virginia Question 1
