= 2026 Missouri Amendment 3 =

2026 Missouri referendum

Missouri Amendment 3
- November 3, 2026
- Prohibit Abortion and Gender Transition Procedures for Minors Amendment
- Reporting: 98.5% as of 9:09 a.m. CST
- Outcome: Not passed

Results
Choice	Votes	%
Yes	941,065	44.51%
No	1,173,172	55.49%
- County results No: 50–60% 60–70% 80–90% Yes: 50–60% 60–70% 70–80%

Missouri Amendment 3 was a legislatively referred constitutional amendment that appeared on the ballot in the U.S. state of Missouri on November 3, 2026. If passed, the amendment would have banned abortion in the state, except in cases to protect the life of the mother, or, up to 12 weeks, in cases of rape and incest. It would also have prohibited medical professionals from administering gender-affirming medical care to minors. Cross-sex hormones and puberty blockers for minors are already banned until August 2027 in the state via Senate Bill 49, while gender affirming surgeries for minors are banned with no expiration date.

A lawsuit was filed in July 2025 by the ACLU of Missouri challenging the ballot language for Amendment 3. In September 2025, a Cole County judge ordered the Secretary of State to modify the amendment's ballot language, to clarify that it would repeal Amendment 3, an amendment passed in November 2024 protecting access to reproductive care in the state.

However, an appeals court also tossed out a court challenge to the ballot measure which argued that Amendment 3 violated Missouri’s single-subject rule by combining abortion and gender-affirming care. The court held that the subjects were sufficiently connected because gender-affirming care can potentially have impacts on fertility and thus could be considered related to reproductive health care.

The amendment failed to pass, keeping abortion rights in the Missouri Constitution.

== Contents ==
On the ballot, Missouri voters were shown the following question and information:

Constitutional Amendment No. 3

Proposed by the 103rd General Assembly

(First Regular Session)

HCS HJR 73

Shall the Missouri Constitution be amended to:

- Repeal the 2024 voter-approved Amendment providing reproductive healthcare rights, including abortion through fetal viability;
- Allow abortions for rape and incest (under twelve-weeks' gestation), emergencies, and fetal anomalies;
- Allow legislation regulating abortion;
- Ensure parental consent for minors' abortions;
- Prohibit gender transition procedures for minors?

State governmental entities estimate no costs or savings. Greene County estimates it may experience an unknown increase in tax revenue. Other local governmental entities estimate no costs or savings.

o Yes

o No

== Endorsements ==
Yes

U.S. senators

- Josh Hawley, Missouri (2019–present) (Republican)
- Eric Schmitt, Missouri (2023–present) (Republican)

U.S. representatives

- Eric Burlison, MO-07 (2023–present) (Republican)
- Ann Wagner, MO-02 (2013–present) (Republican)

Statewide officials

- Catherine Hanaway, attorney general of Missouri (2025–present) (Republican)
- Denny Hoskins, secretary of state of Missouri (2025–present) (Republican)
- Mike Kehoe, governor of Missouri (2025–present) (Republican)

State legislators

- Darin Chappell, state representative from the 137th district (2023–present) (Republican)
- Tim Jones, former speaker of the Missouri House of Representatives (2012–2015) from the 110th district (2007–2015) (Republican)
- Becky Laubinger, state representative from the 117th district (2025–present) (Republican)
- Ed Lewis, state representative from the 6th district (2021–present) (Republican)
- Brian Seitz, state representative from the 156th district (2021–present) (Republican)
- Adam Schnelting, state senator from the 23rd district (2025–present) (Republican)

Organizations

- 40 Days for Life
- Missouri Catholic Conference
- Missouri Right to Life
- Priests for Life
- Susan B. Anthony Pro-Life America

Political parties

- Missouri Republican Party
No

Statewide officials

- Michael A. Wolff, former Missouri Supreme Court justice (1998–2011)

State legislators

- Ashley Aune, state representative from the 14th district (2021–present) (Democratic)
- Elizabeth Fuchs, state representative from the 80th district (2025–present) (Democratic)
- Keri Ingle, state representative from the 35th district (2021–present) (Democratic)
- Mike Moon, state senator from the 29th district (2021–present) (Republican)
- Raychel Proudie, state representative from the 73rd district (2019–present) (Democratic)
- Wick Thomas, state representative from the 19th district (2025–present) (Democratic)

Local officials

- Michael Bloomberg, businessman and former mayor of New York City (2002–2014) (Democratic)

Labor unions

- Missouri AFL-CIO
- SEIU Missouri/Kansas State Council

Organizations

- American Association of University Women Missouri
- American Civil Liberties Union
- Fairness Project
- Freedom, Inc.
- Indivisible St. Louis
- League of Women Voters Missouri
- League of Women Voters St. Louis
- Planned Parenthood Great Plains
- Planned Parenthood Great Rivers
- PROMO
- Reproductive Freedom for All
- St. Louis Democratic Socialists of America

Political parties

- Constitution Party of Missouri
- Missouri Democratic Party

Newspapers

- The St. Louis American
- St. Louis Post-Dispatch

== Polling ==
Poll source	Date(s) administered	Sample size (Note: Key: A – all adults RV – registered voters LV – likely voters V – unclear)	Margin of error	Yes	No	Undecided
Remington Research Group/Missouri Scout	October 14-15, 2026	684 (LV)	± 3.70%	43%	43%	14%
Saint Louis University/YouGov	August 13–24, 2026	900 (LV)	± 4.09%	43%	44%	13%
Saint Louis University/YouGov	February 9–22, 2026	900 (LV)	± 3.6%	47%	40%	12%
Saint Louis University/YouGov (September revision)	February 9–22, 2026	900 (LV)	± 3.91%	50%	39%	11%

== Impact and analysis ==
Several news outlets, advocates and political experts have noted that if the initiative passes, it could influence political trends throughout the nation as it passing would likely lead to a slew of similar ballot initiatives showing up in other states. Missouri Governor, Mike Kehoe, who supports the initiative, said he hopes that if Missouri voters pass Amendment 3, that combining abortion bans with gender-affirming care bans could become a national strategy to ban abortion in other states, particularly in other conservative states which had likewise previously passed ballot measures legalizing abortion.

Some news outlets also noted Republicans are also hoping the anti-trans portion of the measure will increase voter enthusiasm and turnout among Republican voters.

During the campaign period, proponents of the measure focused almost entirely on the gender-affirming care ban, while opponents focused almost entirely on the abortion ban.

Opponents of the measure questioned whether the exceptions for abortion included within could be practically applied. They cited cases, from when abortion was largely banned in Missouri, in which clinicians delayed care for pregnant women experiencing medical emergencies that interacted unpredictably with the law.

Proponents heavily emphasized that the measure would "ban transgender surgeries for minors" in advertisements, while opponents emphasized that it would enact a near blanket-ban on abortion, while downplaying the ban on gender-affirming care, with a campaign spokesperson noting that "The facts are that healthcare for transgender youth is already banned in Missouri and it will remain banned no matter how people vote."

Some proponents of Amendment 3 point to the August 2027 sunset clause on Missouri's 2023 ban on cross-sex hormones and puberty blockers as a reason for why the gender-affirming care ban in Amendment 3 is necessary. However, opponents have argued that the state legislature could easily extend the ban on cross-sex hormones and puberty blockers for minors before the ban expires. Opponents also point out that, despite the proponents focusing heavily on gender-affirming surgeries specifically, Missouri's existing ban on gender-affirming surgeries for minors has no expiration date unlike the ban on cross-sex hormones and puberty blockers.

Saint Louis University political science professor, Steven Rogers observed that the inclusion of the gender-affirming care ban in Amendment 3 "is going to be the key difference between what we saw, say, two years ago and now".

In October 2026, the presidents, CEOs and executive directors for various LGBTQ rights groups including Transgender Law Center, GLAAD, Lambda Legal, Advocates for Trans Equality and the Human Rights Campaign authored a joint article raising alarm that ballot initiatives like Amendment 3 would "serve as testing grounds for the 2028 Presidential election", noting that if these measures pass, political operatives will stress-test field operations, construct voter databases, analyze which misinformation about LGBTQ people can flip a swing district and perfect fear-based messaging on it. The groups warned that if these measures pass in 2026, then the 2028 election cycle will be "flooded with divisive proposals to ban inclusive books, erase LGBTQ families from classrooms, and roll back everything from enshrined reproductive freedom to employment nondiscrimination."

== See also ==
- 2022 Kansas abortion referendum
- 2022 California Proposition 1
- 2022 Michigan Proposal 3
- 2022 Vermont Proposal 5
- November 2023 Ohio Issue 1
- 2024 Arizona Proposition 139
- 2024 Colorado Amendment 79
- 2024 Florida Amendment 4
- 2024 Maryland Question 1
- 2024 Missouri Amendment 3
- 2024 Montana Initiative 128
- 2024 Nebraska Initiative 439
- 2024 Nevada Question 6
- 2024 New York Proposal 1
- 2024 South Dakota Amendment G
- 2024 United States ballot measures
- 2026 Idaho Proposition 1
- 2026 Nevada Question 6
- 2026 Virginia Question 1
- 2026 United States ballot measures
- Abortion in Missouri
- LGBTQ rights in Missouri
- 2026 Colorado Proposition 135
