= 2026 Nevada Question 6 =

- November 3, 2026
- Right to Abortion Initiative
- Reporting: 98.3% as of 5:31 a.m. PST
- Outcome: Passed

Results
Choice	Votes	%
Yes	671,565	63.50%
No	386,076	36.50%
Yes
60–70%
50–60%
No
60–70%
50–60%

Nevada Question 6, officially the Right to Abortion Initiative, is an initiated constitutional amendment that appeared on the ballot in the U.S. state of Nevada on November 3, 2026, concurrent with the 2026 United States elections.

== Background ==
Question 6 was approved in 2024 with 64.36% voting 'Yes', and as Nevada requires initiated constitutional amendments to be approved in two even-numbered election years, it was then certified for the 2026 ballot.

== Impact ==
Question 6 passed, enshrining the right to abortion up to fetal viability in the Nevada Constitution.

== Endorsements ==
Yes

Executive branch officials

- Kamala Harris, former vice president of the United States (2021–2025) (Democratic)

U.S. senators

- Jacky Rosen, Nevada (2019–present) (Democratic)

Organizations

- American Civil Liberties Union Nevada
- Feminist Majority Foundation
- Human Rights Campaign
- NAACP Las Vegas
- Indivisible Northern Nevada
- Planned Parenthood Action Fund
- Reproductive Freedom for All
No

Organizations

- Right to Life Nevada
- Priests for Life
- Students for Life Action

== Polling ==
Poll source	Date(s) administered	Sample size (Note: Key: A – all adults RV – registered voters LV – likely voters V – unclear)	Margin of error	Yes	No	Other	Undecided
Noble Predictive Insights	October 26–28, 2026	487 (LV)	± 4.44%	57%	34%	3% (Note: "Wouldn't vote" with 3%)	6%
Noble Predictive Insights	September 22–26, 2026	800 (RV)	± 3.5%	66%	22%	5% (Note: "Wouldn't vote" with 5%)	7%
Noble Predictive Insights	September 22–26, 2026	708 (LV)	± 3.7%	69%	22%	3% (Note: "Wouldn't vote" with 3%)	6%

== See also ==
- 2022 Kansas abortion referendum
- 2022 California Proposition 1
- 2022 Michigan Proposal 3
- 2022 Vermont Proposal 5
- November 2023 Ohio Issue 1
- 2024 Arizona Proposition 139
- 2024 Colorado Amendment 79
- 2024 Florida Amendment 4
- 2024 Maryland Question 1
- 2024 Missouri Amendment 3
- 2024 Montana Initiative 128
- 2024 Nebraska Initiative 439
- 2024 Nevada Question 6
- 2024 New York Proposal 1
- 2024 South Dakota Amendment G
- 2024 United States ballot measures
- 2026 Idaho Proposition 1
- 2026 Missouri Amendment 3
- 2026 Virginia Question 1
