= Fetal viability =

Ability of a fetus to survive outside the uterus

Fetal viability is the ability of a fetus to survive outside the uterus. Viability depends upon factors such as gestational age, birth weight, sex, genetics, perinatal circumstances, and the availability of advanced medical care. There is no single gestational-age threshold that defines viability in all clinical settings.

In modern, high-resource settings, medical viability is generally considered to be between 23 and 24 weeks' gestational age, meaning that these newborns have a <50% chance of either dying or surviving with severe impairment if active care is instituted; this applies to most fetuses at ≥24 weeks of gestation, and to some fetuses at 23 weeks' gestation with favourable risk factors. Globally, among extremely preterm infants (<28 weeks’ gestational age) born between 2000 and 2024, approximately 61% survived to hospital discharge, with lower survival rates in low-income countries (32%) than in high-income countries (69%).

The term also has ethical and legal significance. In neonatal care, viability may inform decisions about resuscitation and intensive treatment for extremely preterm newborns, particularly near the limit of viability. In law, it has been used as a threshold in abortion regulation, although definitions vary across contexts and legal jurisdictions.

== Definitions ==
"Viability", as the word has been used in United States constitutional law since Roe v. Wade, is the potential of the fetus to survive outside the uterus after birth, natural or induced, when supported by up-to-date medicine. Fetal viability depends largely on the fetal organ maturity, and environmental conditions. According to Websters Encyclopedic Unabridged Dictionary of the English Language, viability of a fetus means having reached such a stage of development as to be capable of living, under normal conditions, outside the uterus. Viability exists as a function of biomedical and technological capacities, which are different in different parts of the world. As a consequence, there is, at the present time, no worldwide, uniform gestational age that defines viability.

The term "viability" may also refer to the assessment of an early intrauterine pregnancy as developing normally (intrauterine fetal pole with cardiac activity). The American College of Obstetricians and Gynecologists (ACOG) has noted that definitions of viability vary in clinical practice and has advised against the inclusion of the concept in legislation or regulation.

According to the McGraw-Hill medical dictionary, a nonviable fetus is "an expelled or delivered fetus which, although living, cannot possibly survive to the point of sustaining life independently, even with support of the best available medical therapy". A legal definition states: "Nonviable means not capable of living, growing, or developing and functioning successfully. It is the antithesis of viable, which is defined as having attained such form and development of organs as to be normally capable of living outside the uterus." [Wolfe v. Isbell, 291 Ala. 327, 329 (Ala. 1973)]

Various jurisdictions have different legal definitions of viability. In Ireland, under the Health (Regulation of Termination of Pregnancy) Act 2018, fetal viability is defined as "the point in a pregnancy at which, in the reasonable opinion of a medical practitioner, the fetus is capable of survival outside the uterus without extraordinary life-sustaining measures" [Definitions (Part 2)(8)].

=== Black's law dictionary 6th edition ===
Viability. Capable of living. A term used to denote the power a newborn child possesses of continuing its independent existence. That stage of fetal development when the life of the unborn child may be continued indefinitely outside the womb by natural or artificial life-support systems. The constitutionality of this statutory definition (V.A.M.S. (Mo.),188.015) was upheld in Planned Parenthood of Central Mo. v. Danforth, 428 U.S. 52,96 S.Ct 2831, 49 L.Ed.2d 788.

For purposes of abortion regulation, viability is reached when, in the judgement of the attending physician on the particular facts of the case before him or her, there is a reasonable likelihood of the fetuses' sustained survival outside the womb, with or without artificial support. Colautti v. Franklin, 439 U.S. 379,388, 99 S.Ct. 675, 682, 58 L.Ed.2d 596. See Also Viable; Viable Child.

== Medical viability ==
Fetal viability is generally considered to begin at 23 or 24 weeks gestational age in the United States.

There is no sharp limit of development, gestational age, or weight at which a human fetus automatically becomes viable. According to one study, between 2013 and 2018 at United States academic medical centers, the percentage of newborns who survived long enough to leave the hospital was 30% at 22 weeks, 55% at 23 weeks, 70% at 24 weeks, and 80% of those born at 25 weeks gestational age. Between 2010 and 2014, babies in the United States had an approximately 70% survival rate when born under weight of 500 g (1.10lb), an increase from a 30.8% survival rate between 2006 and 2010. A baby's chances for survival increases 3 to 4 percentage points per day between 23 and 24 weeks of gestation, and about 2 to 3 percentage points per day between 24 and 26 weeks of gestation. After 26 weeks the rate of survival increases at a much slower rate because survival is high already. Prognosis depends also on medical protocols on whether to resuscitate and aggressively treat a very premature newborn, or whether to provide only palliative care, in view of the high risk of severe disability of very preterm babies.

Stages in prenatal development, showing viability and point of 50% chance of survival (limit of viability) at bottom. Weeks and months numbered by gestation.

According to a Stanford University study on babies born in the most advanced US hospitals between 2013 and 2018, at 23 weeks, 55% of infants survive a preterm birth long enough to be discharged from the hospital, usually months later. Most of these infants experienced some form of significant neurodevelopmental impairment, such as cerebral palsy. Most were re-hospitalized for respiratory illnesses or other medical problems during the first two years of life. Some used adaptive equipment such as walkers or feeding tubes, but most could feed themselves when they were 2 years old. Most had typical vision and hearing.

Completed weeks of gestation at birth	21 and less	22	23	24	25	26	27	28	30	34
Chance of long-term survival with advanced medical care	<1%	30%	55%	70%	80%	88%	90%	95%	>95%	>98%

Global estimates suggest that among extremely preterm infants (<28 weeks’ gestational age) born between 2000 and 2024, approximately 61% survived to hospital discharge. Among survivors, 52% were discharged without major morbidity, defined as the absence of bronchopulmonary dysplasia, severe intraventricular hemorrhage (grade 3 or 4), necrotizing enterocolitis (stage II or III), or retinopathy of prematurity (stage 3, 4, or 5). Survival rates were lower in low-income countries (32%) than in high-income countries (69%).

== Period of viability ==
Beliefs about viability vary by country. Medical decisions regarding the resuscitation of extremely preterm infants (EPI) deemed to be in the "grey zone" usually take into account weight and gestational age, as well as parental views. One 2018 study showed that there was a significant difference between countries in what was considered to be the "grey zone": the "grey zone" was considered to be 22 to 23 weeks in Sweden, 23 to 24 weeks in the UK, and 24 to 26 weeks in the Netherlands. Whether the fetus is in the period of viability may have legal ramifications as far as the fetus' rights of protection are concerned. Traditionally, the period of viability referred to the period after the twenty-eighth week.

Indian Law considers the period of viability to be the period after 24 weeks of gestational age.

=== United States Supreme Court ===
The United States Supreme Court stated in Roe v. Wade (1973) that viability, defined as the "interim point at which the fetus becomes ... potentially able to live outside the mother's womb, albeit with artificial aid", "is usually placed at about seven months (28 weeks) but may occur earlier, even at 24 weeks." The 28-week definition became part of the "trimester framework" marking the point at which the "compelling state interest" (under the doctrine of strict scrutiny) in preserving potential life became possibly controlling, permitting states to freely regulate and even ban abortion after the 28th week. The subsequent Planned Parenthood v. Casey (1992) modified the "trimester framework", permitting the states to regulate abortion in ways not posing an "undue burden" on the right of the mother to an abortion at any point before viability; on account of technological developments between 1973 and 1992, viability itself was legally dissociated from the hard line of 28 weeks, leaving the point at which "undue burdens" were permissible variable depending on the technology of the time and the judgement of the state legislatures.

=== Born-Alive Infants Protection Act of 2002 ===
In 2002, the U.S. government enacted the Born-Alive Infants Protection Act. Whereas a fetus may be viable or not viable in utero, this law provides a legal definition for personal human life when not in utero. It defines "born alive" as "the complete expulsion or extraction from his or her mother of that member, at any stage of development, who after such expulsion or extraction breathes or has a beating heart, pulsation of the umbilical cord, or definite movement of voluntary muscles" and specifies that any of these is the action of a living human person. While the implications of this law for defining viability in medicine may not be fully explored, in practice doctors and nurses are advised not to resuscitate such persons with gestational age of 22 weeks or less, under 400 g weight, with anencephaly, or with a confirmed diagnosis of trisomy 13 or 18.

=== U.S. state laws ===
Forty-three states have laws banning post-viability abortions unless pregnancy threatens the life or health of the woman or there is a fetal abnormality. Some allow doctors to decide for themselves if the fetus is viable. Some require doctors to perform tests to prove a fetus is pre-viable and require multiple doctors to certify the findings. The procedure intact dilation and extraction (IDX) became a focal point in the abortion debate, based on the belief that it is used mainly post-viability. IDX was made illegal in most circumstances by the Partial-Birth Abortion Ban Act in 2003, which the U.S. Supreme Court upheld in the case of Gonzales v. Carhart.

== Limit of viability ==
The limit of viability is the gestational age at which a prematurely born fetus/infant has a 50% chance of long-term survival outside its mother's womb. With the support of neonatal intensive care units, the limit of viability in the developed world has declined since the 1960s.

As of the mid-2000s, the limit of viability is considered to be around 24 weeks, although the incidence of major disabilities remains high at this point. Neonatologists generally would not provide intensive care at 23 weeks, but would from 26 weeks.

Different jurisdictions have different policies regarding the resuscitation of extremely premature newborns, that may be based on various factors such as gestational age, weight and medical presentation of the baby, the desires of parents and medical practitioners. The high risk of severe disability of very premature babies or of mortality despite medical efforts lead to ethical debates over quality of life and futile medical care, but also about the sanctity of life as viewed in various religious doctrines.

As of 2025, the world record for the lowest gestational age newborn to survive is held by Nash Keen, who was born at 21 weeks on 5 July 2024 in the United States. He weighed 285 grams (10 oz) and was 24cm long (9.5 in). The record was previously held by Curtis Zy-Keith Means, who was also born on 5 July, 2020, at 21 weeks and 1 day gestational age, weighing 420 grams.

A preterm birth, also known as premature birth, is defined as babies born alive before 37 weeks of pregnancy are completed. There are three types of preterm births: extremely preterm (less than 28 weeks), very preterm (28 to 32 weeks) and moderate to late preterm (32 to 37 weeks).

== Factors that influence the chance of survival ==
There are several factors that affect the chance of survival of the baby. Two notable factors are age and weight. The baby's gestational age (number of completed weeks of pregnancy) at the time of birth and the baby's weight (also a measure of growth) influence whether the baby will survive. Another major factor is gender: male infants have a slightly higher risk of dying than female infants, for which various explanations have been proposed.

The likelihood of survival among extremely preterm infants depends on several factors in addiction to gestational age and brith rate. This includes the presence of major congenital abnormalities, respiratory complications, and other serious medical conditions. For example, breathing problems, congenital abnormalities or malformations, and the presence of other severe diseases, especially infection, threaten the survival of the neonate. The outcomes are also influenced by the availability of neonatal intensive care and clinical decisions made regarding resuscitation and intensive treatments.

Other factors may influence survival by altering the rate of organ maturation or by changing the supply of oxygen to the developing fetus.

The mother's health plays a significant role in the child's viability. Diabetes in the mother, if not well controlled, slows organ maturation; infants of such mothers have a higher mortality. Severe high blood pressure before the 8th month of pregnancy may cause changes in the placenta, decreasing the delivery of nutrients and/or oxygen to the developing fetus and leading to problems before and after delivery.

Rupture of the fetal membranes before 24 weeks of gestation with loss of amniotic fluid markedly decreases the baby's chances of survival, even if the baby is delivered much later.

The quality of the facility—whether the hospital offers neonatal critical care services, whether it is a Level I pediatric trauma care facility, the availability of corticosteroids and other medications at the facility, the experience and number of physicians and nurses in neonatology and obstetrics and of the providers has a limited but still significant impact on fetal viability. Facilities that have obstetrical services and emergency rooms and operating facilities, even if smaller, can be used in areas where higher services are not available to stabilize the mother and fetus or neonate until they can be transferred to an appropriate facility.

== See also ==
- Beginning of human personhood
- Futile medical care
- Office for Human Research Protections#Additional protection for pregnant women, human fetuses, and neonates
