= Abortion in the United States =

Status of elective abortion in the United States Illegal, limited exceptions (Note: All states and territories, apart from the Northern Mariana Islands, allow abortion to prevent the woman's imminent death (with various definitions of "imminent"), and some for other reasons. Northern Mariana Islands allows exceptions per law, but no law has been passed. • Additional allowance for risk to the woman's physical health: Alabama, Arizona, Florida, Georgia, Indiana, Iowa, Kansas, Kentucky, Louisiana, Missouri, Montana, Nebraska, New Hampshire, North Carolina, North Dakota, Ohio, Pennsylvania, South Carolina, Tennessee, Utah, West Virginia, Wisconsin, and Wyoming. • Allowance for risk to the woman's general health: California, Connecticut, Delaware, Hawaii, Indiana, Illinois, Maine, Maryland, Massachusetts, Michigan, Minnesota, Nevada, New York, Rhode Island, Virginia, Washington. • Allowance for pregnancy due to rape or incest: Georgia, Idaho, Indiana, Iowa, Mississippi, North Dakota, South Carolina, West Virginia, Utah, and Wyoming. • Allowance for lethal fetal abnormality: Alabama, Delaware, Florida, Georgia, Indiana, Iowa, Louisiana, Maryland, Massachusetts, South Carolina, West Virginia, Wyoming, and Utah. Note that these allowances may have a time limit, which may be as early as cardiac-cell activity (approximately 6 weeks LMP); others may have no limit. Different allowances may have different limits in the same state.) Legal, but no providers Legal before cardiac-cell activity (Note: Cardiac-cell activity is generally detectable in the 6th week LMP. Allowance beyond this limit is made, at minimum, for an immediate threat to the woman's life. In general, states that permit limited elective abortion may allow abortion beyond that limit for some or all of the reasons listed above.) Legal through 12th week LMP* Legal through 18th week LMP* Legal through 22nd week LMP* (5 months) Legal before fetal viability (Note: Typically, fetal viability begins in the 23rd or 24th week LMP.) Legal through 24th week LMP* (5½ months) Legal through second trimester (Note: The second trimester is variously defined as through 27th or 28th week LMP.) Legal at any stage *LMP is the time elapsed since the last menstruation began. This color-coded map illustrates the current legal status of elective-specific abortion procedures in each of the individual states, U.S. territories, and federal district. State supreme courts and other high courts may mandate that abortions either are able or are not able to be performed, even if law allows or does not allow it. A colored border indicates a more stringent restriction or ban that is blocked by legal injunction.

In the United States, abortion is a divisive issue in politics and culture wars. Prior to the mid-19th century, English common law formed the basis of abortion law in the colonies and the early Republic.

Connecticut was the first state to regulate abortion in 1821; it outlawed abortion after quickening, the moment in pregnancy when the pregnant woman starts to feel the fetus's movement in the uterus, and forbade the use of poisons to induce one post-quickening. Many states subsequently passed various laws on abortion until the Supreme Court of the United States decisions of Roe v. Wade and Doe v. Bolton decriminalized abortion nationwide in 1973. The Roe decision imposed a federally mandated uniform framework for state legislation on the subject. It also established a minimal period during which abortion is legal, with more or fewer restrictions throughout the pregnancy.

That basic framework, modified in Planned Parenthood v. Casey (1992), remained nominally in place, although the effective availability of abortion varied significantly from state to state, as many counties had no abortion providers. Planned Parenthood v. Casey held that a law could not place legal restrictions imposing an "undue burden" for "the purpose or effect of placing a substantial obstacle in the path of a woman seeking an abortion of a nonviable fetus." In December 2021, the FDA legalized telemedicine provision of medication abortion pills with delivery by mail, but many states have laws which restrict this option.

In 2022, Roe and Casey were overturned in Dobbs v. Jackson Women's Health Organization, ending federal protection of abortion rights and allowing individual states to regulate any aspect of abortion not preempted by federal law. Since 1976, the Republican Party has generally sought to restrict abortion access based on the stage of pregnancy or to criminalize abortion, whereas the Democratic Party has generally defended access to abortion and has made contraception easier to obtain.

The abortion-rights movement advocates for patient choice and bodily autonomy, while the anti-abortion movement advocate that the fetus has a right to live. Historically framed as a debate between the pro-choice and pro-life labels, most Americans agree with some positions of each side. Support for abortion gradually increased in the U.S. beginning in the early 1970s, and stabilized during the 2010s. The abortion rate has continuously declined from a peak in 1980 of 30 per 1,000 women of childbearing age (15–44) to 11.3 by 2018. In 2018, 78% of abortions were performed at 9 weeks or less gestation, and 92% of abortions were performed at 13 weeks or less gestation. By 2023, medication abortions accounted for 63% of all abortions. Almost 25% of women will have had an abortion by age 45, with 20% of 30 year olds having had one. In 2019, 60% of women who had abortions were already mothers, and 50% already had two or more children. Increased access to birth control has been statistically linked to reductions in the abortion rate. The first state to decriminalize abortion prior to Roe was Hawaii.

As of 2025, Arizona, California, Colorado, Maryland, Michigan, Missouri, Montana, New York, Ohio, Vermont have explicitly enshrined a right to abortion in their state constitutions, while in Alaska, Illinois, Kansas, Minnesota and Wyoming court rulings have enshrined such protections. Other states, such as Massachusetts and Oregon, protect abortion under state law. The state constitutions of Alabama, Arkansas, Louisiana, Tennessee, and West Virginia explicitly contain no right to an abortion, while the state constitution of Nebraska prohibits abortion after the first trimester.

== Terminology ==
In medical parlance, "abortion" refers only to the end of an intrauterine pregnancy before the embryo or fetus can survive outside the uterus. This is inclusive of spontaneous abortion (more commonly referred to as miscarriage or early pregnancy loss) and to induced abortion, where a pregnancy is ended through medication or a medical procedure. The abortion debate most commonly relates to the induced abortion of a pregnancy, which is also how the term "abortion" is used in a legal sense. (Note: According to the Supreme Court's decision in Roe v. Wade (1973): (a) For the stage prior to approximately the end of the first trimester, the abortion decision and its effectuation must be left to the medical judgment of the pregnant woman's attending physician. (b) For the stage subsequent to approximately the end of the first trimester, the State, in promoting its interest in the health of the mother, may, if it chooses, regulate the abortion procedure in ways that are reasonably related to maternal health. (c) For the stage subsequent to viability, the State in promoting its interest in the potentiality of human life may, if it chooses, regulate, and even proscribe, abortion except where it is necessary, in appropriate medical judgment, for the preservation of the life or health of the mother. The 5th edition of the Black's Law Dictionary (1979) defined abortion as "knowing destruction" or "intentional expulsion or removal". The 2nd Edition, published in 1910, defined abortion in criminal law as "The miscarriage or premature delivery of a woman who is quick with child" and that "when brought about with a malicious design, or for an unlawful purpose, it is a crime in law.")

Because abortion has been politicized, there has been a proliferation of ill-defined, inconsistently applied terms with no medical or clinical basis. Concepts like "late-term abortion", or "partial-birth abortion" are not medical terms and do not have clinical significance. Similarly, terms like "elective abortion" append unnecessary qualifiers that are not rooted in medical or legal distinctions. The American College of Obstetricians and Gynecologists recommends using the terms "induced abortion" or simply "abortion" instead. Additionally, some drugs that do not induce medical abortions, such as levonorgestrel, have been referred to as abortifacients by a US Senator.

== History ==
=== Early history and rise of anti-abortion legislation ===
Abortion in what eventually became the United States was governed by English Common law, which held that abortion after quickening was murder. This was repeated by Henry de Bracton, Matthew Hale, and William Blackstone. The common law on abortions before quickening was varying.

Some historians argue that abortion was a fairly common practice in the history of the United States, and was not always controversial. At a time when society was more concerned with the more serious consequence of women becoming pregnant out of wedlock, family affairs were handled out of public view. Abortion did not become a public controversy until the health risk of unsafe abortions by (female) unlicensed practitioners was brought to the public attention in the 19th century. James Mohr wrote that even though pre-quickening abortion was legal in the first three decades of the 19th century, only 1 in 25 to 1 in 30 pregnancies ended in abortion. By the 1850s and 1860s, this number had increased to 1 in 5 or 1 in 6. John Keown highlighted some challenges in pinning down the common law view, observing that "evidence of quickening would clearly facilitate prosecution".

In the mid-18th century, Benjamin Franklin included a recipe for an abortifacient in a math textbook. In 1728, Franklin condemned publisher Samuel Keimer for publishing an article on abortion. According to biographer Walter Isaacson, Franklin did not have a strong view on the issue. In The Speech of Polly Baker, Franklin places the blame for abortion and infanticide on the sexual double standard against women. He urges lawmakers not to turn natural actions into crimes through their laws. They highlight the severe consequences of such laws, including the distress and harm caused to mothers who feel compelled to resort to abortion due to fear of punishment. He believes these laws are responsible for these tragedies and calls for their repeal. Additionally, they point out the issue of unmarried men who avoid family responsibilities and suggest imposing a law to compel them to marry or face higher fines.

In 1716, New York passed an ordinance prohibiting midwives from providing abortion. Founding Father and Second President of the United States John Adams praised the Spartan lawgiver Lycurgus for refusing his sister-in-law from having an abortion even though it prevented him from assuming power. Thomas Jefferson wrote approving of a quote by Montesquieu that "‘there is among savages another custom . . . it is the cruel practice of abortion." Jefferson added that the Natives stopped the practice after becoming "civilized".

Within the context of a sex scandal, Connecticut became the first state to regulate abortion by statute in 1821. Many states subsequently passed various abortion laws. In 1829, New York made post-quickening abortions a felony and pre-quickening abortions a misdemeanor. This was followed by 10 of the 26 states creating similar restrictions within the next few decades, in particular by the 1860s and 1870s. The first laws related to abortion were made to protect women from real or perceived risks, and those more restrictive penalized only the provider. Criminalization did not end the practice of abortion; unlicensed doctors and midwives continued to perform them. Most of the women receiving abortions from unlicensed practitioners were poor. Women's safety continued to be a concern, especially after the highly publicized death of Mary Rogers. Wealthier women could pay willing physicians to broadly interpret health exceptions in their favor. Euphemistic advertisements for abortifacients offered an assortment of herbal remedies.

A number of other factors likely played a role in the rise of anti-abortion laws. As in Europe, abortion techniques advanced starting in the 17th century, and the conservatism of most in the medical profession with regards to sexual matters prevented the wide expansion of abortion techniques. Physicians, who were the leading advocates of abortion criminalization laws, appear to have been motivated at least in part by advances in medical knowledge. Science had discovered that fertilization inaugurated a more or less continuous process of development, which produced a new human being. Quickening was found to be not more or less crucial in the process of gestation than any other step. Many physicians concluded that if society considered it unjustifiable to terminate pregnancy after the fetus had quickened, and if quickening was a relatively unimportant step in the gestation process, then it was just as wrong to terminate a pregnancy before quickening as after quickening. Patricia Cline Cohen, a professor emeritus at the University of California, Santa Barbara, said that these laws had come about not because society saw abortion as a crime but from a small group of doctors who had taken it upon themselves to prove to the rest of the county that pre-quickening abortion should be seen as a crime. The doctors used flawed math to convince the American Medical Association to accept that pre-quickening abortion should also be outlawed, leading to the raft of state laws banning abortion in the latter half of the 19th century. Doctors were also influenced by practical reasons to advocate anti-abortion laws. For one, abortion providers were usually female midwives without formal training or education. In an age where the leading doctors in the nation were attempting to standardize the medical profession, these unlicensed practitioners were considered a nuisance to public health.

Despite campaigns to end the practice of abortion, abortifacient advertising was highly effective and abortion was commonly practiced, with the help of a midwife or other women, in the mid-19th century, although they were not always safe. While the precise abortion rate was not known, James Mohr's 1978 book Abortion in America documented multiple recorded estimates by 19th-century physicians, which suggested that between around 15% and 35% of all pregnancies ended in abortion during that period. This era also saw a marked shift in the people who were obtaining abortions. Before the start of the 19th century, most abortions were sought by unmarried women, who had become pregnant out of wedlock and for which there was much less compassion compared to married women who got an abortion; many of them were wealthy and paid well. Out of 54 abortion cases published in American medical journals between 1839 and 1880, over half were sought by married women, and well over 60% of the married women already had at least one child.

The sense that married women were now frequently obtaining abortions worried many conservative physicians, who were almost exclusively men. In the Reconstruction era, much of the blame was placed on the burgeoning women's rights movement. Although the medical profession expressed hostility toward feminism, many feminists of the era were also opposed to abortion. In The Revolution, a newspaper operated by Elizabeth Cady Stanton and Susan B. Anthony, an 1869 opinion piece was published arguing that instead of merely attempting to pass a law against abortion, the root cause must also be addressed. The writer stated that simply passing an anti-abortion law would be "only mowing off the top of the noxious weed, while the root remains. ... No matter what the motive, love of ease, or a desire to save from suffering the unborn innocent, the woman is awfully guilty who commits the deed. It will burden her conscience in life, it will burden her soul in death; But oh! thrice guilty is he who drove her to the desperation which impelled her to the crime." To many feminists of this era, abortion was regarded as an undesirable necessity forced upon women by thoughtless men. The free love wing of the feminist movement refused to advocate for abortion and treated the practice as an example of the hideous extremes to which modern marriage was driving women. Marital rape and the seduction of unmarried women were societal ills, which feminists believed caused the need to abort, as men did not respect women's right to abstinence. Feminist opposition to abortion was much less prevalent by the 20th century, and it was feminists and physicians who came to question anti-abortion laws and raise public interest in the 1960s.

In 1873, Anthony Comstock created the New York Society for the Suppression of Vice, an institution dedicated to supervising the morality of the public. Later that year, Comstock successfully influenced the United States Congress to pass the Comstock Law, which made it illegal to deliver through the U.S. mail any "obscene, lewd, or lascivious" material. It also prohibited producing or publishing information pertaining to the procurement of abortion, birth control, and venereal disease, including to medical students. The production, publication, importation, and distribution of such materials was suppressed under the Comstock Law as being obscene, and similar prohibitions were passed by 24 of the 37 states.

By 1900, abortion was normally a felony in every state. Some states included provisions allowing for abortion in limited circumstances, generally to protect the woman's health or to terminate pregnancies arising from rape or incest. Most Americans did not view abortion as a crime, and abortions continued to occur and became increasingly available. The American Birth Control League was founded by Margaret Sanger in 1921; it would become Planned Parenthood Federation of America in 1942. By the 1930s, licensed physicians performed an estimated 800,000 abortions a year.

In 1970, Norma McCorvey (1947–2017)—using the pseudonym "Jane Roe"—filed a federal lawsuit against Henry Wade, the District Attorney of Dallas County, Texas, asserting an absolute right to terminate a pregnancy by any means and at any time. In 1998, McCorvey opposed abortion; however, in the 2020 documentary "AKA Jane Roe", she claimed that she had been paid.

=== Unsafe abortions ===
In 1988, 17 year old Becky Bell died from an infection after an unsafe abortion. She lived in Indiana where parental consent was required to have a safe and legal abortion. Laurence H. Tribe wrote in Abortion: The Clash of Absolutes that Bell's best friend said that Becky considered an out-of-state abortion to get around Indiana's parental consent requirement. It is possible she performed the abortion herself. However it was done, Becky died from an infection that was probably caused by the procedure. Her parents publicly campaigned against parental consent laws after her death.

Rosie Jimenez died from sepsis in 1977 following an abortion procedure at the home of a midwife who was not licensed to perform abortions. She did not go to a licensed physician because the Hyde Amendment barring public Medicaid funding for abortions had gone into effect after surviving a statutory challenge in Beal v. Doe and an Equal Protection challenge in Maher v. Roe.

Dr. Abu Hayat was convicted by a Manhattan Court in 1993 for performing an illegal third trimester abortion at his clinic in Alphabet City. The doctor began the dilation and evacuation procedure which was not legal in the third trimester. The baby was born alive before the procedure could be completed. She was missing an arm that had been severed during the D&E.

Hayat argued that he was protected from criminal conviction by Roe v. Wade based on an argument that the baby had not yet been born when he attempted the procedure.

Another patient was forced to leave Hayat's clinic halfway through a procedure after Dr. Hayat demanded more money that her husband could not afford to pay. The patient nearly died and was treated at a local hospital for severe infection caused by pieces of dismembered fetus being left in her uterus. 17 year old Sophie McCoy died in 1990 from an infected uterine perforation after receiving an abortion at Dr. Hayat's clinic.

Inequality in access to safe and legal abortions persists to this day whereby many women cannot afford to obtain a legal abortion; in such cases, women may turn to illegal abortion.

=== Sherri Finkbine ===
In the early 1960s, a controversy centered around children's television host Sherri Finkbine that helped bring abortion and abortion law more directly into the American public eye. Living in the area of Phoenix, Arizona, Finkbine had had four healthy children; during her pregnancy with her fifth child, she discovered the child might have severe deformities when born. This was likely because Finkbine had been taking sleeping pills that she was unaware contained thalidomide, a drug that increases the risk of fetal deformities during pregnancy. Though Finkbine wanted an abortion, the abortion laws of Arizona only allowed abortions if a pregnancy posed a threat to the woman's life. The situation gained public attention after Finkbine shared the story with a reporter from The Arizona Republic, who disclosed her identity in spite of her requests for anonymity. On August 18, 1962, Finkbine traveled to Sweden to obtain a legal abortion, where it was confirmed that the fetus had severe deformities.

=== Pre-Roe precedents ===
In 1964, Gerri Santoro of Connecticut died trying to obtain an illegal abortion, and her photo became the symbol of an abortion-rights movement. Some women's rights activist groups developed their own skills to provide abortions to women who could not obtain them elsewhere. As an example, in Chicago, a group known as "Jane" operated a floating abortion clinic throughout much of the 1960s. Women seeking the procedure would call a designated number and be given instructions on how to find "Jane".

In 1965, the U.S. Supreme Court case Griswold v. Connecticut struck down one of the remaining contraception Comstock laws in Connecticut and Massachusetts. However, Griswold only applied to marital relationships, allowing married couples to buy and use contraceptives without government restriction. It took until 1972, with Eisenstadt v. Baird, to extend the precedent of Griswold to unmarried persons as well. Following the Griswold case, the American College of Obstetricians and Gynecologists (ACOG) issued a medical bulletin accepting a recommendation from six years earlier that clarified that "conception is the implantation of a fertilized ovum", and consequently birth control methods that prevented implantation became classified as contraceptives, not abortifacients.

In 1967, Colorado became the first state to decriminalize abortion in cases of rape, incest, or in which pregnancy would lead to permanent physical disability of the woman. Similar laws were passed in California, Oregon, and North Carolina. In 1970, Hawaii became the first state to legalize abortions on the request of the woman, and New York repealed its 1830 law and allowed abortions up to the 24th week of pregnancy. Similar laws were soon passed in Alaska and Washington. In 1970, Washington held a referendum on legalizing early pregnancy abortions, becoming the first state to legalize abortion through a vote of the people. A law in Washington, D.C., which allowed abortion to protect the life or health of the woman, was challenged in the Supreme Court in 1971 in United States v. Vuitch. The court upheld the law, deeming that "health" meant "psychological and physical well-being", essentially allowing abortion in Washington, D.C. By the end of 1972, 13 states had a law similar to that of Colorado, while Mississippi allowed abortion in cases of rape or incest only and Alabama and Massachusetts allowed abortions only in cases where the woman's physical health was endangered. In order to obtain abortions during this period, women would often travel from a state where abortion was illegal to one where it was legal. The legal position prior to Roe v. Wade was that abortion was illegal in 30 states and legal under certain circumstances in 20 states.

=== Roe v. Wade ===
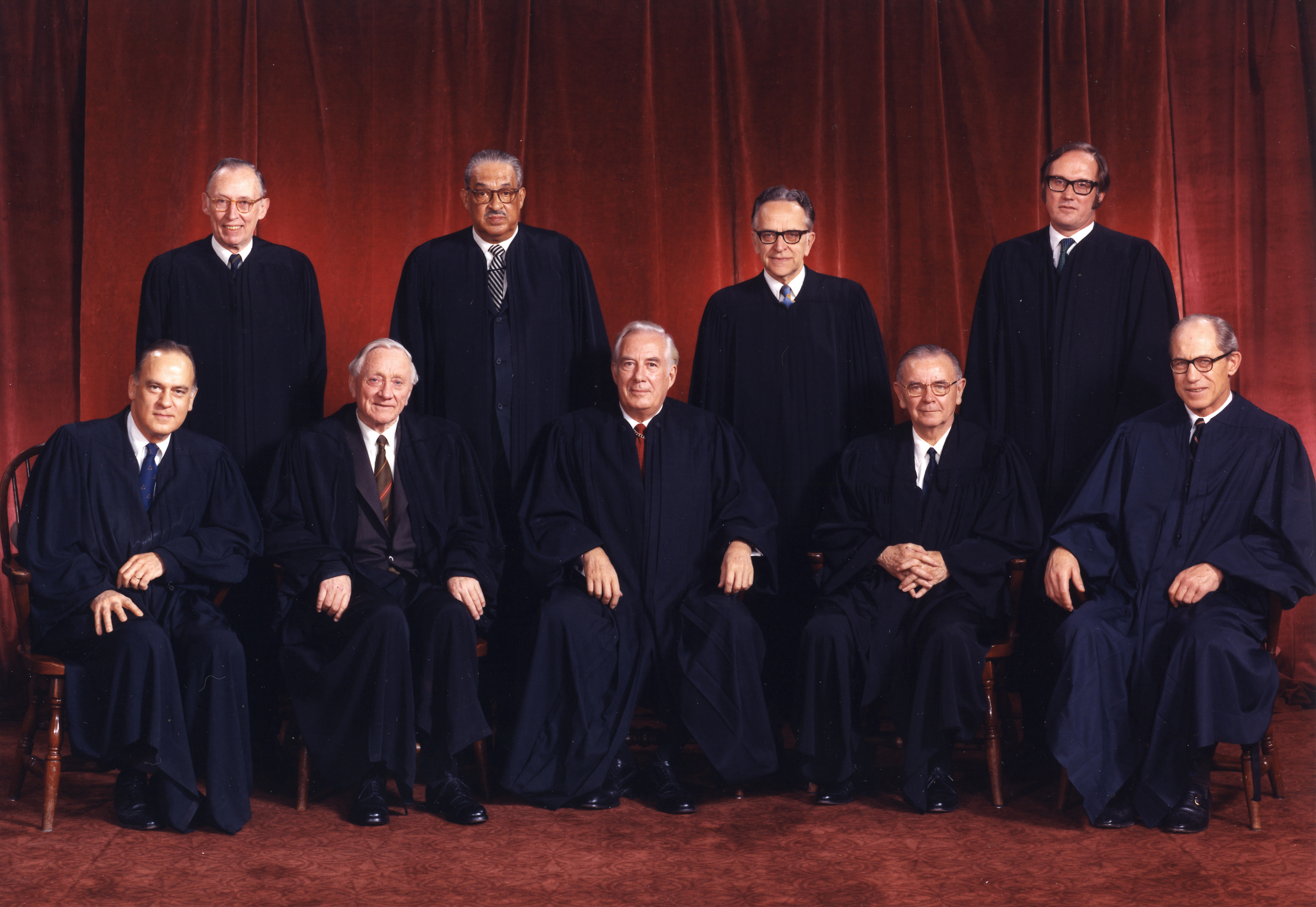
The United States Supreme Court membership in 1973 F.l.t.r. seated Potter Stewart, William O. Douglas, Warren E. Burger (chief justice), William Brennan, and Byron White. Standing Lewis F. Powell, Thurgood Marshall, Harry Blackmun, and William Rehnquist.

Prior to Roe v. Wade, 30 states prohibited abortion without exception, 16 states banned abortion except in certain special circumstances (e.g. rape, incest, and health threat to mother), 3 states allowed residents to obtain abortions, and New York allowed abortions generally. Early that year, on January 22, 1973, the U.S. Supreme Court in Roe v. Wade invalidated all of these laws, and set guidelines for the availability of abortion. The decision returned abortion to its liberalized pre-1820 status. Roe established that the right of privacy of a woman to obtain an abortion "must be considered against important state interests in regulation". Roe also established a trimester framework, defined as the end of the first pregnancy trimester (12 weeks), as the threshold for state interest, such that states were prohibited from banning abortion in the first trimester but allowed to impose increasing restrictions or outright bans later in pregnancy.

Abortion laws in the U.S. before Roe: Fully illegal (1 state). Legal in cases of risk to woman's life (29 states). Legal in cases of rape (1 state). Legal in cases of risk to woman's health (2 states). Legal in cases of risk to woman's health, rape or incest, or likely damaged fetus (12 states). Legal on request (5 states).

In deciding Roe v. Wade, the Court ruled that a Texas statute forbidding abortion except when necessary to save the life of the mother was unconstitutional. The Court arrived at its decision by concluding that the issue of abortion and abortion rights falls under the right of privacy in the United States (e.g. federal constitutionally-protected right), in the sense of the right of a person not to be encroached by the state. In its opinion, it listed several landmark cases where the court had previously found a right to privacy implied by the Constitution. The Court did not recognize a right to abortion in all cases, saying: "State regulation protective of fetal life after viability thus has both logical and biological justifications. If the State is interested in protecting fetal life after viability, it may go so far as to proscribe abortion during that period, except when it is necessary to preserve the life or health of the mother."

The Court recognized a right to privacy, which includes the right to abortion until viability, determined by the abortion doctor. After viability, abortions can occur for health reasons, including psychological well-being. A key issue in the Roe case is when human life or personhood begins. The Court refrained from addressing this, stating that there is no consensus in medicine or philosophy. It noted that historically, the unborn have not been recognized as persons under the law and that the state has a compelling interest in protecting potential life at viability..

==== Doe v. Bolton ====
Under Roe v. Wade, state governments may not prohibit late terminations of pregnancy when "necessary to preserve the life or health of the mother", even if it would cause the demise of a viable fetus. This rule was clarified by the 1973 judicial decision Doe v. Bolton, which specifies "that the medical judgment may be exercised in the light of all factors—physical, emotional, psychological, familial, and the woman's age—relevant to the well-being of the patient". It is by this provision for the mother's mental health that women in the U.S. legally choose abortion after viability when screenings reveal abnormalities that do not cause a baby to die shortly after birth.

=== Religious response to legalization of abortion ===
In the late 1960s, a number of organizations were formed to mobilize opinion both against and for the legalization of abortion. In 1966, the National Conference of Catholic Bishops assigned Monsignor James T. McHugh to document efforts to reform abortion laws, and anti-abortion groups began forming in various states in 1967. In 1968, McHugh led an advisory group which became the National Right to Life Committee. The forerunner of the NARAL Pro-Choice America was formed in 1969 to oppose restrictions on abortion and expand access to abortion. Following Roe v. Wade, in late 1973, NARAL became the National Abortion Rights Action League. Evangelical Christians were initially generally either supportive or indifferent to Roe — citing what they saw as a lack of biblical condemnation on the matter, its perceived affirmation of religious liberty, and furthering of non-intrusive government — but by the 1980s began to join anti-abortion Catholics to overturn the decision.

=== Planned Parenthood v. Casey ===
In the 1992 case of Planned Parenthood v. Casey, the Court abandoned Roe's strict trimester framework but maintained its central holding that women have a right to choose to have an abortion before viability. Roe had held that statutes regulating abortion must be subject to "strict scrutiny"—the traditional Supreme Court test for impositions upon fundamental Constitutional rights. Casey instead adopted the lower, undue burden standard for evaluating state abortion restrictions, but re-emphasized the right to abortion as grounded in the general sense of liberty and privacy protected under the constitution: "Constitutional protection of the woman's decision to terminate her pregnancy derives from the Due Process Clause of the Fourteenth Amendment to the United States Constitution. It declares that no state shall "deprive any person of life, liberty, or property, without due process of law." The controlling word in the cases before us is 'liberty'."

The Supreme Court continues to make decisions on this subject. On April 18, 2007, it issued a ruling in the case of Gonzales v. Carhart, involving a federal law entitled the Partial-Birth Abortion Ban Act of 2003 which President George W. Bush had signed into law. The law banned intact dilation and extraction, which opponents of abortion rights referred to as "partial-birth abortion", and stipulated that anyone breaking the law would get a prison sentence up to 2.5 years. The United States Supreme Court upheld the 2003 ban by a narrow majority of 5–4, marking the first time the Court has allowed a ban on any type of abortion since 1973. The opinion, which came from justice Anthony Kennedy, was joined by Justices Antonin Scalia, Clarence Thomas, and the two recent appointees, Samuel Alito and Chief Justice John Roberts.

In the case of Whole Woman's Health v. Hellerstedt, the Supreme Court in a 5–3 decision on June 27, 2016, swept away forms of state restrictions on the way abortion clinics can function. The Texas legislature enacted in 2013 restrictions on the delivery of abortions services that, it was argued by its opponents, created an undue burden for women seeking an abortion by requiring abortion doctors to have difficult-to-obtain "admitting privileges" at a local hospital and by requiring clinics to have costly hospital-grade facilities. The Court supported this argument and struck down these two provisions "facially" from the law at issue—that is, the very words of the provisions were invalid, no matter how they might be applied in any practical situation. According to the Supreme Court, the task of judging whether a law puts an unconstitutional burden on a woman's right to abortion belongs with the courts, and not the legislatures.

The Supreme Court ruled similarly in June Medical Services, LLC v. Russo on June 29, 2020, in a 5–4 decision that a Louisiana state law, modeled after the Texas law at the center of Whole Woman's Health, was unconstitutional. Like Texas' law, the Louisiana law required certain measures for abortion clinics that, if having gone into effect, would have closed five of the six clinics in the state. The case in Louisiana was put on hold pending the result of Whole Woman's Health, and was retried based on the Supreme Court's decision. While the District Court ruled the law unconstitutional, the Fifth Circuit found that unlike the Texas law, the burden of the Louisiana law passed the tests outlined in Whole Woman's Health, and thus the law was constitutional. The Supreme Court issued an order to suspend enforcement of the law pending further review, and agreed to hear the case in full in October 2019. It was the first abortion-related case to be heard by President Donald Trump's appointees to the Court, Neil Gorsuch and Brett Kavanaugh. The Supreme Court found the Louisiana law unconstitutional for the same reasons as the Texas one, reversing the Fifth Circuit. The judgment was supported by Chief Justice John Roberts who had dissented on Whole Woman's Health but joined in judgment as to upholding the court's respect for the past judgment in that case.

=== Federal provision for telemedical abortions ===
In December 2021, the FDA legalized telemedical provision of abortion pills with delivery by mail, after finding this to be safe and effective, and having suspended enforcement of previous restrictions during the COVID-19 pandemic. As of June that year, 31 states allowed the practice, fourteen required the prescribing clinician to be physically present, which effectively banned telemedicine, and five explicitly banned telemedical abortion.

=== Dobbs v. Jackson Women's Health Organization ===
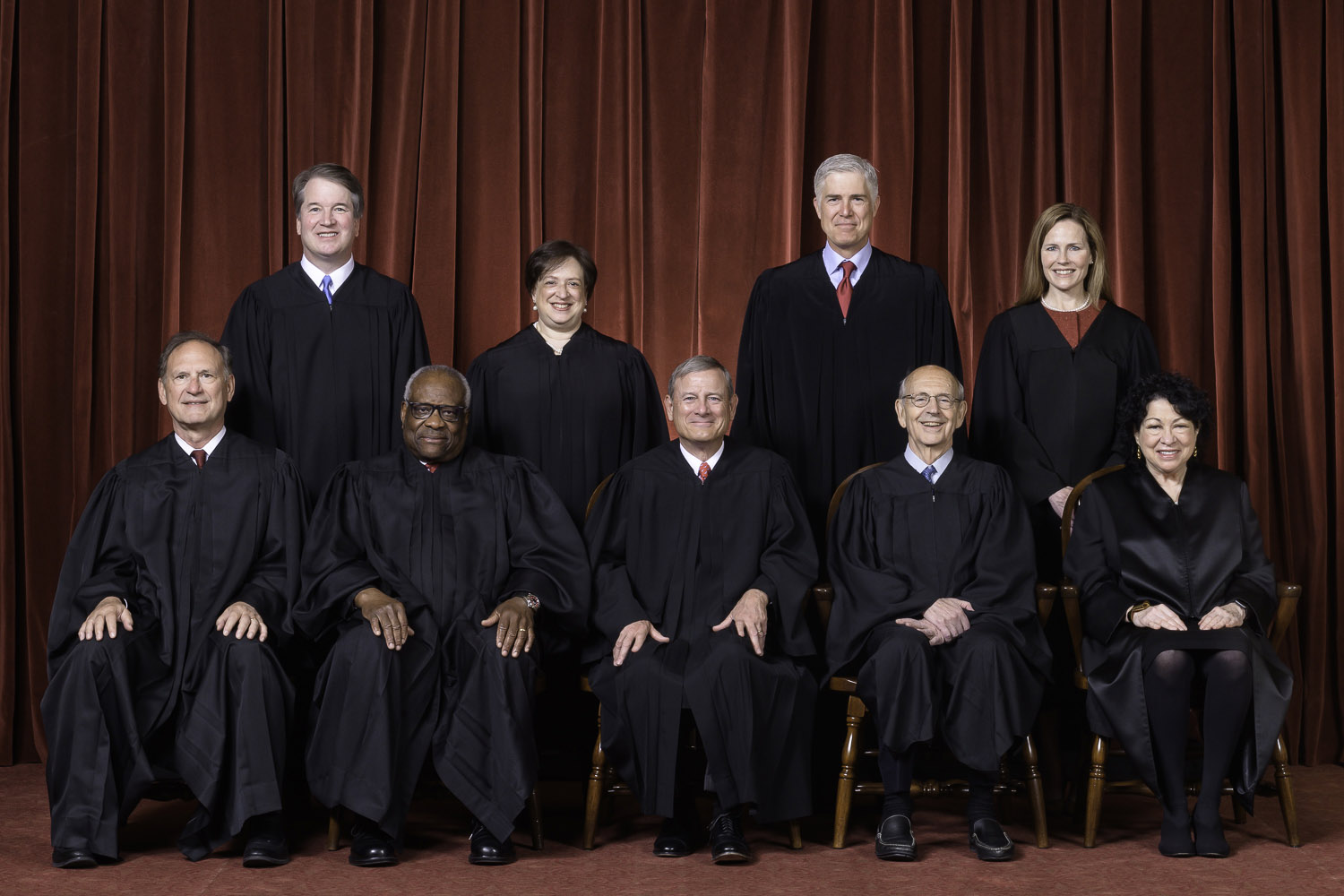
The composition of the Supreme Court at the time of Dobbs Front row, l.t.r.: Samuel Alito, Clarence Thomas, John G. Roberts, Jr., Justice Stephen G. Breyer, Sonia Sotomayor. Back row, l.t.r.: Brett M. Kavanaugh, Elena Kagan, Neil M. Gorsuch, Amy Coney Barrett.

The Supreme Court granted certiorari to Dobbs v. Jackson Women's Health Organization in May 2021, a case that challenges the impact of Roe v. Wade in blocking enforcement of a 2018 Mississippi law (the Gestational Age Act) that had banned any abortions after the first 15 weeks. Oral arguments to Dobbs were held in December 2021, and a decision was expected by the end of the 2021–22 Supreme Court term. On September 1, 2021, Texas passed the Texas Heartbeat Act, one of the most restrictive abortion laws in the nation, banning most procedures after six weeks. On May 2, 2022, a leaked draft majority opinion for Dobbs, written by Samuel Alito, set to overturn Roe was reported by Politico.

On June 24, 2022, the Supreme Court overruled both Roe and Planned Parenthood v. Casey in the Dobbs case on originalist grounds that a right to abortion cannot be found in the U.S. Constitution. John Roberts, the Chief Justice of the United States, concurred in the decision to uphold the law at question as constitutional, by a 6–3 vote, but did not support overruling both Roe and Casey. This enabled trigger laws, which had been passed in 13 states, to ban abortions in those states.

Abortion-related initiatives were placed on the 2022 ballot in six states, as 2022 California Proposition 1, 2022 Michigan Proposal 3, and 2022 Vermont Proposal 5 enshrined the right to an abortion in state constitutions, while the 2022 Kansas abortion referendum, 2022 Kentucky Amendment 2, and Montana Legislative Referendum No. 131 rejected restrictions on abortion. Voters in Ohio defeated August 2023 Ohio Issue 1, which intended to make changes to the state's constitution more difficult. November 2023 Ohio Issue 1 was then approved by a majority of voters, which added the right to an abortion to the Ohio constitution.

FDA v. Alliance for Hippocratic Medicine brought into question the Food and Drug Administration (FDA)'s approval and rules around mifepristone, after lower courts had deemed the FDA's approval unlawful. In Arizona, the state Supreme Court ruled in Planned Parenthood Arizona v. Mayes that instead of a 15-week ban on abortion passed by the state in 2022, that the state should follow a 1902 law, based on a pre-ratification 1864 law, that disallowed nearly any abortion except in the case of a medical emergency, though the state government repealed the 1902 law in May 2024 to allow the 2022 law to take precedence. Some Republicans, including allies of presidential candidate Donald Trump, have pushed Project 2025, a sweeping government reform plan that includes banning abortions at a federal level as well as access to medical abortions drugs. Democrats used the pushback against these Republican and conservative anti-abortion goals as a point of campaigning for the election.

Although states nominally allow abortion to prevent the woman's imminent death, five women have died to pregnancy related issues in Texas alone due to doctors refusing to perform abortions because of the state's abortion law despite the de jure legal circumstances.

Abortion-related issues were a topic in the 2024 United States elections, including these referendums: 2024 Arizona Proposition 139, 2024 Colorado Amendment 79, 2024 Florida Amendment 4, 2024 Montana Initiative 128, 2024 Maryland Question 1, 2024 Missouri Amendment 3, 2024 New York Proposal 1, 2024 Nebraska Initiative 439, 2024 Nevada Question 6, and 2024 South Dakota Amendment G.

In 2026, 2024 Nevada Question 6 needs to be approved again to enshrine abortion in the state's constitution, while legislators in Hawaii, Virginia, and the state of Washington proposed similar amendments to codify abortion rights in 2026.

== Fetal homicide laws ==
Gerardo Flores was convicted of two counts of capital murder in 2005 under Texas' fetal homicide law. His girlfriend Erica Basoria testified that she had asked him to step on her stomach because her attempts to induce miscarriage on herself had been unsuccessful. Flores said he initially refused but she would not relent until he agreed. Flores admitted to police that he "accidentally, probably" hit Basoria in the face during a fight on the night of the miscarriage. Basoria told police that he was not abusive. Texas' fetal homicide law did not allow charges against the mother because she had a right to terminate pregnancy, so only Flores was charged.

In 2019 a woman in Alabama was indicted after she was shot in the stomach for intentionally causing the death of "unborn baby Jones by initiating a fight knowing she was five months pregnant". The charges were later dropped.

== Medical abortion and telemedical access ==
Medical abortion via mifepristone and misoprostol was approved for abortion in the United States by the FDA in September 2000. As of 2007, it was legal and available in all 50 states, Washington, D.C., Guam, and Puerto Rico. It is a prescription drug, but was not initially available to the public through pharmacies; its distribution is primarily restricted to specially qualified licensed physicians, sold by Danco Laboratories under the brand name Mifeprex.

=== History ===
French pharmaceutical company Roussel-Uclaf, (the company that synthesized mifepristone in 1980 and took it through clinical trials for approval in France by 1988) did not seek US approval, so in the United States legal availability was not initially possible. The United States banned importation of mifepristone for personal use in 1989, a decision supported by Roussel Uclaf. In 1994, Roussel Uclaf gave the U.S. drug rights to the Population Council in exchange for immunity from any product liability claims. The Population Council sponsored clinical trials in the United States. The drug went on approvable status from 1996. Production was intended to begin through the Danco Group in 1996, but they withdrew briefly in 1997 due to a corrupt business partner, delaying availability again. Mifepristone was approved for abortion in the United States by the FDA in September 2000.

In 2016, the US Food and Drug Administration (FDA) approved mifepristone, to end a pregnancy through 70 days gestation (70 days or less since the first day of a woman's last menstrual period). The approved dosing regimen is 200 mg of mifepristone taken by mouth (swallowed). 24 to 48 hours after taking mifepristone, 800 mcg (micrograms) of misoprostol is taken buccally (in the cheek pouch), at a location appropriate for the patient.

As of September 2021, in 32 states, the drug could only be provided by a licensed physician, and in 19 states, the prescribing clinician was required to be physically in the room with the patient while they are taking the drug.

In the midst of the COVID-19 pandemic on December 16, 2021, in light of the difficulties in accessing in-person healthcare services, the FDA approved the distribution of mifepristone via mail. In states where abortion is banned or restricted, women are able to obtain pills through ordering from overseas online pharmacies, purchasing from pharmacies in Mexico, from services such as Aid Access, or through a network of U.S.-Mexico border organizations that includes Red Necesito Abortar, Las Libres, and Marea Verde.

On 16 December 2021, the FDA voluntarily adopted a new rule permanently relaxing the requirement that the pill be obtained in person, allowing it to be sent through the mail. A prescription is still required, so that a doctor can screen for risk factors that would make taking the pill unsafe for the mother. In January 2023, the FDA further relaxed rules, allowing any retail pharmacy to become certified to fill mifepristone prescriptions.

In January 2023, the U.S. Department of Justice stated that USPS mailing of pills for medication abortion, even into states where abortion services are restricted, does not violate federal law. In 2023, online access to abortion medication by mail delivered by the U.S. Postal Service is currently available to citizens of all states.

In light of the Dobbs decision, the Alliance Defending Freedom launched a lawsuit in November 2022 in the Northern District of Texas under Judge Matthew J. Kacsmaryk to seek to overturn the FDA's original approval of mifepristone. The Alliance argued that the FDA had ignored some studies that showed the medication to have harmful side effects, while the current federal administration under Joe Biden, the manufacturers of the drugs, and several doctors vouched for the safety of the drugs and argued that the plaintiffs lacked standing. Judge Kacsmaryk ruled for the Alliance on April 7, 2023, reversing the FDA's approval and banning mifepristone across the United States after seven days. A district judge in a separate lawsuit, Thomas O. Rice of the Eastern District of Washington, ruled that the FDA should not reverse access to mifepristone in 16 states. Kacsmaryk's ruling was partially reversed by a panel on the Fifth Circuit Court of Appeals, leaving mifepristone on the market but reverting efforts made by the FDA to liberalize its use over seven years. The case was appealed to the Supreme Court, and on June 13, 2024, the court ruled that the Alliance Defending Freedom lacked standing to bring the suit.

In January 2023, GenBioPro filed suit to overturn state laws that prohibit sale of mifepristone, claiming that such laws are invalid because it is a federally approved drug. After regulations on abortion early in pregnancy were ruled constitutional by the 2022 decision Dobbs v. Jackson Women's Health Organization, some states enacted restrictions on abortions and abortion pills. In January 2023, the United States Department of Justice issued an interpretation of the Comstock Act that it was legal for United States Postal Service employees to deliver the pills in any state, because they could not know whether the pills would be used for an abortion or other purposes.

The argument that state laws seeking to ban or restrict the use of mifepristone are preempted by the FDA's decision to make the drug available is supported by a number of Supreme Court decisions, including opinions by the traditionally more conservative Justices.

In March 2023, Wyoming became the first US state to ban the pill.

In April 2023, in a lawsuit brought by 17 US states and the District of Columbia, federal district judge Thomas O. Rice issued a temporary injunction that the FDA should not reduce access to mifepristone in these states and the district.

In May 2024, the state of Louisiana classified mifepristone and misoprostol as controlled substances, with penalties for possession without a prescription. The move follows concerns over coerced abortion and has drawn criticism from over 240 doctors in the state.

In December 2025, the states of Florida and Texas filed a lawsuit against the FDA challenging its approval of mifepristone in 2000 and approval of a generic in 2025.

==== FDA v. Alliance for Hippocratic Medicine ====
In April 2023, in the FDA v. Alliance for Hippocratic Medicine lawsuit, federal district judge Matthew J. Kacsmaryk issued a preliminary injunction suspending the 2000 approval of mifepristone, which would take effect a week later. The Fifth Circuit reversed parts of Kacsmaryk's injunction, but placed a temporary injunction on the 2016 REMS change to mifepristone. On appeal to the Supreme Court, the Court stayed both injunctions on 21 April 2023, with only Justices Samuel Alito and Clarence Thomas stating their dissent. The stay allowed mifepristone to remain legally available while the lower courts consider the merits of the case.

In June 2024, the US Supreme Court unanimously overturned judge Kacsmaryk's Fifth Circuit decision on the grounds that the Alliance for Hippocratic Medicine had no standing to challenge the FDA's regulations of mifepristone. The Supreme Court ruled that Alliance for Hippocratic Medicine did not demonstrate that they would suffer harm to warrant standing. The Court did not rule on the substance of mifepristone, abortion, or the FDA's procedures.

==== Subsection H ====
Some drugs are approved by the FDA under subsection H, which has two subparts. The first sets forth ways to rush experimental drugs, such as aggressive HIV and cancer treatments, to market when speedy approval is deemed vital to the health of potential patients. The second part of subsection H applies to drugs that not only must meet restrictions for use due to safety requirements, but also are required to meet postmarketing surveillance to establish that the safety results shown in clinical trials are seconded by use in a much wider population. Until December 2021, Mifepristone was approved under the second part of subsection H. The result is that women could not pick the drug up at a pharmacy, but were required to receive it directly from a doctor. Due to the possibility of adverse reactions such as excessive bleeding, which may require a blood transfusion, and incomplete abortion, which may require surgical intervention, the drug was only considered safe if a physician who is capable of administering a blood transfusion or a surgical abortion is available to the patient in the event of such emergencies. The approval of mifepristone under subsection H included a black box warning.

=== Telemedical abortion ===
During the COVID pandemic, and coupled with growing restrictions on abortion access in conservative states, the FDA performed trial runs of telemedical abortions, allowing doctors to prescribe mifepristone and other medical abortion drugs without an in-person visit by the patient. By December 2021, the FDA advanced approval to for telemedical abortions for all registered providers. which was made final by 2023. As of July 2025, 25 states allowed telemedical abortions, the prescription of medical abortion drugs without an in-person visit to a doctor, without restriction, 13 states allowed abortion but had restrictions on telemedical abortions, and 12 states banned abortion.

The FDA's action, coupled with the Dobbs decision, led many conservative states to seek new laws to ban citizens in their states from telemedical abortion, or seeking penalties from those that prescribe that medication from other states. As a result, eight states where telemedical abortion was legal passed shield laws shield laws to enable physicians to remotely prescribe abortion medication to patients in states where abortion is banned. In December 2024, 27% of clinician-assisted abortions were provided through telemedicine: 12% for patients in states without restrictions, 9% for patients in states where abortion was banned, 4% for patients in states with 6-week term limits, and 2% for patients in states with telehealth restrictions.

Louisiana v. FDA
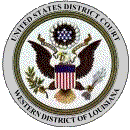
- Court: Western District of Louisiana
- Started: October 3, 2025; 13 months ago
- Docket nos.: 6:25-cv-01491 (W.D. La.); 26-30203 (5th Cir.); 25A1207 and 25A1208 (Supreme Court)

Case history
- Appealed to: Fifth Circuit
- Subsequent action: 5th Circuit order stayed by Supreme Court via shadow docket

Outcome
- Ongoing

Court membership
- Judge sitting: David C. Joseph

In October 2025, Louisiana Attorney General Liz Murrill and the Alliance Defending Freedom filed Louisiana v. FDA against the Food and Drug Administration and Department of Health and Human Services challenging the 2023 Risk Evaluation and Mitigation Strategies (REMS) for mifepristone which removed the in-person dispensing requirement. The Republican Attorneys General of 21 states filed in support of Louisiana's lawsuit. The lawsuit is one of several brought by Republican Attorneys General seeking to restrict mifepristone. In April 2026, Judge David C. Joseph paused the case while the second Trump administration conducts a review of the 2023 REMS.

On May 1, 2026, Republican-appointed Judges Kyle Duncan, Leslie H. Southwick, and Kurt D. Engelhardt on the Fifth Circuit Court of Appeals unanimously blocked the 2023 REMS, preventing the mailing of mifepristone country-wide. However, the Supreme Court temporarily lifted the Fifth Circuit's order via the shadow docket on May 4, and stayed it for an indefinite period on May 14, over dissent from Alito and Thomas. The ruling will remain in effect through at least the course of the Louisiana-FDA lawsuit, which is expected to continue into the year 2027.

== Legal status ==
=== Federal legislation ===
Beyond limitations pertaining to abortion in the context of federal funding, there is little federal legislation protecting or penalizing abortion in the United States. This is because the federal government is one of limited and enumerated powers, such that the Supreme Court has held that "direct control of medical practice in the states is beyond the power of the federal government" and that the federal government has no general police power to legislate over health, education, and welfare.

The Partial-Birth Abortion Ban Act of 2003, Freedom of Access to Clinic Entrances Act of 1994, and Comstock Act of 1873 are some of the few pieces of existing federal law that provide substantive criminal provisions either protecting or penalizing abortion. The provisions in the Partial Birth Abortion Ban Act and the Freedom of Access to Clinic Entrances Act cover activity affecting interstate or foreign commerce, to which the former was upheld (against constitutional attack under the 5th amendment) by the Supreme Court in Gonzales v. Carhart (2007). The provisions of the Comstock Act primarily cover activity using the mail or postal system, and the Comstock Act was first upheld by Supreme Court in Ex parte Jackson (1878).

The legality of abortion is frequently a major issue in nomination battles for the U.S. Supreme Court. Nominees typically remain silent on the issue during their hearings, as the issue may come before them as judges. In 2021, the Women's Health Protection Act, which would protect abortion rights by federal statute, was introduced by Judy Chu. The bill passed the U.S. House of Representatives but was rejected by the U.S. Senate. After the Dobbs decision, Merrick Garland, then-U.S. Attorney General, asserted that under federal law, states do not have the power to restrict access to FDA-approved abortion pills.

On September 13, 2022, Republican senator Lindsey Graham introduced, and likewise failed to pass, federal legislation banning abortion nationwide after 15-weeks post-gestation with exceptions for rape, incest, and the life of the pregnant person, named the Protecting Pain-Capable Unborn Children from Late-Term Abortions Act.

=== Penalties by state ===
Currently, 13 states have criminal penalties for performing abortions, regardless of gestational age. The penalties in states that have made abortion illegal vary, as outlined below.

This chart lists only the penalties authorized specifically by the state laws which explicitly restrict (or ban) abortions. The chart does not address the risk of being prosecuted for violating any other law because of the abortion. The jurisprudence surrounding this question – whether laws such as "fetal-personhood laws", or laws originally intended to protect pregnant women and their pregnancies from external aggressors, can now also be used to prosecute women who obtain abortions, or who terminate their own pregnancies, deliberately or unintentionally – is unsettled, variable, and, in some states, unclear. States with criminal penalties that are blocked by a court or have yet to take effect are denoted by a gray background.

| State | Sentence | |
| State | Abortion providers | Patients getting abortions |
|---|---|---|
| Alabama | Performing an abortion is a Class A felony punishable by imprisonment for at least 10 years up to 99 years or life. Attempting to perform an abortion is a Class C felony punishable by imprisonment for at least 1 year and 1 day up to 10 years. | None authorized by the state's ban on abortion. |
| Arkansas | Performing or attempting to perform an abortion is an unclassified felony punishable by imprisonment not to exceed 10 years and/or a maximum fine of $100,000. | None authorized by the state's ban on abortion. |
| Idaho | Performing an abortion is a felony punishable by imprisonment for not less than 2 and not more than 5 years and/or a maximum fine of $5,000. | Purposely terminating a pregnancy other than by live birth is a felony punishable by imprisonment for not less than 1 and not more than 5 years and/or a maximum fine of $5,000. |
| Indiana | Performing an illegal abortion is a Level 5 felony punishable by imprisonment for 1 to 6 years and/or a fine of up to $10,000. | None authorized by the state's ban on abortion. |
| Kentucky | Intentional termination of life of an unborn human being is a class D felony punishable by imprisonment for not less than 1 and not more than 5 years. | None authorized by the state's ban on abortion. |
| Louisiana | Committing an abortion is punishable by imprisonment for not less than one year and not more than ten years and/or a fine of not less than $10,000 or more than $100,000. | None authorized by the state's ban on abortion. |
| Mississippi | Performing or attempting to perform an abortion is punishable by imprisonment for not less than 1 year and not more than 10 years. | None authorized by the state's ban on abortion. |
| North Dakota | Performing an abortion is a class C felony punishable by imprisonment for a maximum of five years and/or a fine of $10,000. | None authorized by the state's ban on abortion. |
| Oklahoma | Performing or attempting to perform an abortion is a felony punishable by imprisonment for a term not to exceed ten years and/or a maximum fine of $100,000. | None authorized by the state's ban on abortion. |
| South Dakota | Procurement of abortion is a class 6 felony punishable by up to two years imprisonment and/or a fine of $4,000. | |
| Tennessee | Performing or attempting to perform an abortion is a class C felony punishable by imprisonment for not less than 3 years and not more than 15 years. | None authorized by the state's ban on abortion. |
| Texas | Performing or attempting to perform an abortion is a first-degree felony if an unborn child ("an individual living member of the homo sapiens species from fertilization until birth, including the entire embryonic and fetal stages of development") dies as a result of the offense punishable by imprisonment of not less than 5 years and not more than 99 years and a maximum fine of $10,000; or a second-degree felony otherwise punishable by imprisonment of not less than 2 years and not more than 20 years and a maximum fine of $10,000. | None authorized by the state's ban on abortion. |
| Utah | Killing an unborn child (not defined in the statute) is a second-degree felony punishable by imprisonment for not less than 1 and not more than 15 years. | |
| West Virginia | Performing an illegal abortion is a felony punishable by imprisonment for a minimum of 3 years and a maximum of 10 years. | None authorized by the state's ban on abortion. |

=== State-by-state legal status ===
States in which the right to an abortion is protected, either through state law, a state supreme court ruling, or both. Abortion access protected via both state law and state Constitution Abortion access protected by state Constitution Abortion access protected by state law No state level protections Abortion access restricted by state Constitution

Mandatory waiting period laws in the US No mandatory waiting period. Waiting period of 24 hours. Waiting period of 72 hours. No elective abortion.

Prior to 2021, abortion was legal in all U.S. states, and every state had at least one abortion clinic. Abortion is a controversial political issue, and regular attempts to restrict it occur in most states. Two such cases, originating in Texas and Louisiana, led to the Supreme Court cases of Whole Woman's Health v. Hellerstedt (2016) and June Medical Services, LLC v. Russo (2020) in which several Texas and Louisiana restrictions were struck down.

The issue of minors and abortion is regulated at the state level, and 37 states require some parental involvement, either in the form of parental consent or in the form of parental notification. In certain situations, the parental restrictions can be overridden by a court. Mandatory waiting periods, mandatory ultrasounds and scripted counseling are common abortion regulations. Abortion laws are generally stricter in conservative Southern states than they are in other parts of the country.

In 2019, New York passed the Reproductive Health Act (RHA), which repealed a pre-Roe provision that banned third-trimester abortions except in cases where the continuation of the pregnancy endangered a pregnant woman's life.

Abortion in the Northern Mariana Islands, a United States Commonwealth territory, is illegal.

Alabama House Republicans passed a law on April 30, 2019, that will criminalize most abortion if it goes into effect. Dubbed the "Human Life Protection Act", it offers only two exceptions: serious health risk to the mother or a lethal fetal anomaly. Amendments that would have added cases of rape or incest to the list of exceptions were rejected It will also make the procedure a Class A felony. Twenty-five male Alabama senators voted to pass the law on May 13. The next day, Alabama governor Kay Ivey signed the bill into law, primarily as a symbolic gesture in hopes of challenging Roe v. Wade in the Supreme Court.

Since Alabama introduced the first modern anti-abortion legislation in April 2019, five other states have also adopted abortion laws including Mississippi, Kentucky, Ohio, Georgia and most recently Louisiana on May 30, 2019.

In May 2019, the U.S. Supreme Court upheld an Indiana state law that requires fetuses which were aborted be buried or cremated. In a December 2019 case, the court declined to review a lower court decision which upheld a Kentucky law requiring doctors to perform ultrasounds and show fetal images to patients before abortions.

On June 29, 2020, previous Supreme Court rulings banning abortion restrictions appeared to be upheld when the U.S. Supreme Court struck down the Louisiana anti-abortion law. Following the ruling, the legality of laws restricting abortion in states such as Ohio was then called into question. It was also noted that Supreme Court Chief Justice John Roberts, who agreed that the Louisiana anti-abortion law was unconstitutional, had previously voted to uphold a similar law in Texas which was struck down by the U.S. Supreme Court in 2016.

In May 2021, Texas lawmakers passed the Texas Heartbeat Act, banning abortions as soon as cardiac activity can be detected, typically as early as six weeks into pregnancy, and often before women know they are pregnant due to the length of the menstrual cycle (which usually lasts a median of four weeks and in some cases can be irregular). In order to avoid traditional constitutional challenges based on Roe v. Wade, the law provides that any person, with or without any vested interest, may sue anyone that performs or induces an abortion in violation of the statute, as well as anyone who "aids or abets the performance or inducement of an abortion, including paying for or reimbursing the costs of an abortion through insurance or otherwise." The law was challenged in courts, though had yet to have a full formal hearing as its September 1, 2021, enactment date came due. Plaintiffs sought an order from the U.S. Supreme Court to stop the law from coming into effect, but the Court issued a denial of the order late on September 1, 2021, allowing the law to remain in effect. While unsigned, Chief Justice John Roberts and Justice Stephen Breyer wrote dissenting opinions joined by Justices Elena Kagan and Sonia Sotomayor that they would have granted an injunction on the law until a proper judicial review.

On September 9, 2021, Merrick Garland, the Attorney General and head of the United States Department of Justice, sued Texas over the Texas Heartbeat Act on the basis that "the law is invalid under the Supremacy Clause and the Fourteenth Amendment to the United States Constitution, is preempted by federal law, and violates the doctrine of intergovernmental immunity". Garland further noted that the United States government has "an obligation to ensure that no state can deprive individuals of their constitutional rights." The Complaint avers that Texas enacted the law "in open defiance of the Constitution". The relief requested from the U.S. District Court in Austin, Texas includes a declaration that the Texas Act is unconstitutional, and an injunction against state actors as well as any and all private individuals who may bring a SB 8 action. The idea of asking a federal court to impose an injunction upon the entire civilian population of a state is unprecedented and has drawn eyebrows.

In April 2022 Colorado passed into law its Reproductive Health Equity Act, which assures abortion rights for all citizens of the state. While the bill as passed maintained the status quo for abortion rights, it assures that "every individual has a fundamental right to make decisions about the individual's reproductive health care, including the fundamental right to use or refuse contraception; a pregnant individual has a fundamental right to continue a pregnancy and give birth or to have an abortion and to make decisions about how to exercise that right; and a fertilized egg, embryo, or fetus does not have independent or derivative rights under the laws of the state" regardless of changes that may happen at the federal level.

On May 25, 2022, Oklahoma imposed a ban on almost all abortions after Oklahoma Governor Kevin Stitt signed House Bill 4327. The bill bans abortion beginning at conception, with exceptions only in cases of "rape, sexual assault, or incest that has been reported to law enforcement", or if "the abortion is necessary to save the life of a pregnant woman in a medical emergency". The law also permits private citizens to file lawsuits against (1) abortion providers (2) any individual who "aids and abets" an induced abortion, including paying for an abortion through insurance or otherwise, or (3) any individuals who intend to provide or to aid and abet an induced abortion. A lawsuit was immediately filed by the ACLU in opposition to the bill. At the time of enactment, Oklahoma was the only U.S. state to have passed a bill imposing such restrictions; the law made Oklahoma the first U.S. state to ban induced abortion procedures since prior to the ruling and implementation of Roe in 1973.

on June 24, 2022, after the Supreme Court overturned Roe, Texas and Missouri immediately banned abortions with the exception only if the pregnancy was deemed to be particularly life-threatening.

On January 28, 2023, the Minnesota state Senate passed a bill guaranteeing women's rights to abortion and other reproductive medicine which was signed into law on January 31. The bill prohibits state and local governments from attempting to restrict access to sterilization or prenatal care, while also requiring contraceptive cost compensation.

In June 2024 abortion in Iowa was made illegal after 6 weeks of gestation, with exceptions for rape, incest, foetal abnormalities, and the mother's life.

In 2023, five women launched a class action lawsuit against the State of Texas after they were reportedly denied abortions at a clinic in the State despite grave risks to their life. Four of the women traveled out of state in order to obtain an abortion, while the fifth only received the abortion in Texas when she was hospitalized after the fetus suffered a premature rupture of membranes. The case argues that the Texas law, which allows abortion if there is a health risk to the mother, is too vague and doctors will not perform an abortion for fear of legal repercussions.

=== In response to the coronavirus pandemic ===
Amid the COVID-19 pandemic, anti-abortion government officials in several American states enacted or attempted to enact restrictions on abortion, characterizing it as a non-essential procedure that can be suspended during the medical emergency. The orders have led to several legal challenges and criticism by human rights groups and several national medical organizations, including the American Medical Association. Legal challenges on behalf of abortion providers, many of which were represented by the American Civil Liberties Union and Planned Parenthood, successfully stopped most of the orders on a temporary basis.

One challenge was made against the FDA's rule on the distribution of mifepristone (RU-486), one of the two-part drug regimen to induce abortions. Since 2000, it is only available through health providers under the FDA's ruling. Due to the COVID-19 pandemic, access to mifepristone was a concern, and the American College of Obstetricians and Gynecologists along with other groups sued to have the rule relaxed to allow women to be able to access mifepristone at home through mail-order or retail pharmacies. While the Fourth Circuit issued a preliminary injunction against the FDA's ruling that would have allowed wider distribution, the Supreme Court ordered in a 6–3 decision in January 2021 to put a stay on the injunction, maintaining the FDA's rule.

=== Sanctuary cities ===
Since 2019, the anti-abortion movement in the United States has sought declarations of "sanctuary cit[ies] for the unborn". In June 2019, the city council of Waskom, Texas, voted to outlaw abortion in the city, declaring Waskom a "sanctuary city for the unborn" (the first such city to designate itself as such), as state governments elsewhere in the United States were also drafting abortion bans. As of July 2019, there is no abortion clinic in the city. The Waskom ordinance has led other small cities in Texas, and as of April 2021 in Nebraska, to vote in favor of becoming "sanctuary cities for the unborn".

On April 6, 2021, Hayes Center, Nebraska, became the first city in Nebraska to outlaw abortion by local ordinance, declaring itself a "sanctuary city for the unborn." The city of Blue Hill, Nebraska, followed suit and enacted a similar ordinance outlawing abortion on April 13, 2021. In May 2021, Lubbock, Texas, with a population of less than 270,000, voted to ban abortion with the "sanctuary city for the unborn ordinance", becoming the largest city in the U.S. to ban abortion.

Abortion rights movements have also pushed for similar counterpart legislation in other cities.

== Abortion financing ==
State Medicaid coverage of medically necessary abortion services (text-based list): Medicaid covers medically necessary abortion for low-income women through legislation. Medicaid covers medically necessary abortions for low-income women under court order. Medicaid denies abortion coverage for low-income women except for cases of rape, incest, life or health endangerment, or severe fetal abnormality. Medicaid denies abortion coverage for low-income women except for cases of rape, incest, life endangerment, or severe fetal abnormality. Medicaid denies abortion coverage for low-income women except for cases of rape, incest, or life or health endangerment. Medicaid denies abortion coverage for low-income women except for cases of rape, incest, or life endangerment. Medicaid denies abortion coverage for low-income women except for cases of life endangerment.

The abortion debate has also been extended to the question of who pays the medical costs of the procedure, with some states using the mechanism as a way of reducing the number of abortions.

The cost of an abortion varies depending on factors such as location, facility, timing, type of procedure, and whether or not there is insurance or some other type of financial assistance. In 2022, a medication abortion cost was about $580 at Planned Parenthood, though it could be more, up to around $800, in other facilities. During the first trimester an in-clinic abortion cost up to around $800, though often less; the average cost at Planned Parenthood was about $600. A second trimester procedure varied depending on the stage of pregnancy. The average ranged from about $715 earlier in the second trimester to $1,500–2,000 later in the second trimester. A variety of resources from support organizations are available to contribute to the costs of the procedure, as well as travel expenses.

=== Abortion fund organizations ===
A variety of organizations offer financial support for people seeking abortions, including travel and other expenses. Access Reproductive Care–Southeast (ARC Southeast), the Brigid Alliance, the Midwest Access Coalition (MAC), and the National Network of Abortion Funds are examples of such groups.

=== Medicaid ===
The Hyde Amendment is a federal legislative provision barring the use of federal Medicaid funds to pay for abortions except for rape and incest. The provision, in various forms, was in response to Roe v. Wade, and has been routinely attached to annual appropriations bills since 1976, and represented the first major legislative success by the pro-life movement. The law requires that states cover abortions under Medicaid in the event of rape, incest, and life endangerment.

=== Private insurance ===
- Six states require coverage in all private plans: California, Illinois, Maine, New York, Oregon, and Washington. (2021)
- Note: The following figures are from 2008 and may have changed since that time.
- 5 states (ID, KY, MO, ND, OK) restrict insurance coverage of abortion services in private plans: OK limits coverage to life endangerment, rape or incest circumstances; and the other four states limit coverage to cases of life endangerment.
- 11 states (CO, KY, MA, MS, NE, ND, OH, PA, RI, SC, VA) restrict abortion coverage in insurance plans for public employees, with CO and KY restricting insurance coverage of abortion under any circumstances.
- U.S. laws also ban federal funding of abortions for federal employees and their dependents, Native Americans covered by the Indian Health Service, military personnel and their dependents, and women with disabilities covered by Medicare.

=== Mexico City policy ===
Under this policy, U.S. federal funding to NGOs that provide abortion is not permitted. The policy was first announced by President Ronald Reagan in 1984. It has been rescinded by Democratic presidents and reinstated by Republican presidents. The policy was rescinded in 2021 by President Joe Biden and reinstated on January 24, 2025, by President Donald Trump.

== Qualifying requirements for abortion providers ==
Qualifying requirements for performing abortions vary from state to state. Vermont has allowed physician assistants to do some first-trimester abortions since the mid-1970s. More recently, several states have changed their requirements for abortion providers, anticipating that the Supreme Court would overturn Roe v. Wade; now that the court has done so, more states are expanding eligibility to provide abortions. As of July 2022, California, Connecticut, Delaware, Hawaii, Illinois, Maine, Maryland, Massachusetts, Montana, New Jersey, New York, Rhode Island, Virginia and Washington allow mid-level practitioners such as nurse practitioners, nurse midwives, and physicians assistants, to do some first-trimester abortions. In other states, non-physicians are not permitted to perform abortions.

== Statistics ==
Because reporting of abortions is not mandatory, statistics are of varying reliability. Both the Centers For Disease Control (CDC) and the Guttmacher Institute regularly compile these statistics. However, in 2024 the Guttmacher Institute raised alarm that the Trump administration has severely gutted CDC efforts to collect these data.

=== Number of abortions ===
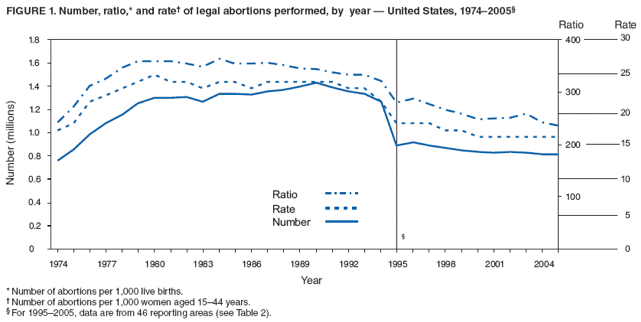
caption=Chart source: CDC, 2005.

The annual number of legal induced abortions in the U.S. doubled between 1973 and 1979, and peaked in 1990. There was a slow but steady decline throughout the 1990s. Overall, the number of annual abortions decreased by 6% between 2000 and 2009, with temporary spikes in 2002 and 2006.

By 2011, abortion rate in the nation dropped to its lowest point since the Supreme Court legalized the procedure. According to a study performed by Guttmacher Institute, long-acting contraceptive methods had a significant impact in reducing unwanted pregnancies. There were fewer than 17 abortions for every 1,000 women of child-bearing age. That was a 13%-decrease from 2008's numbers and slightly higher than the rate in 1973, when the Supreme Court's Roe v. Wade decision legalized abortion. The study indicated a long-term decline in the abortion rate.

In 2016, the Centers for Disease Control and Prevention (CDC) reported 623,471 abortions, a 2% decrease from 636,902 in 2015.

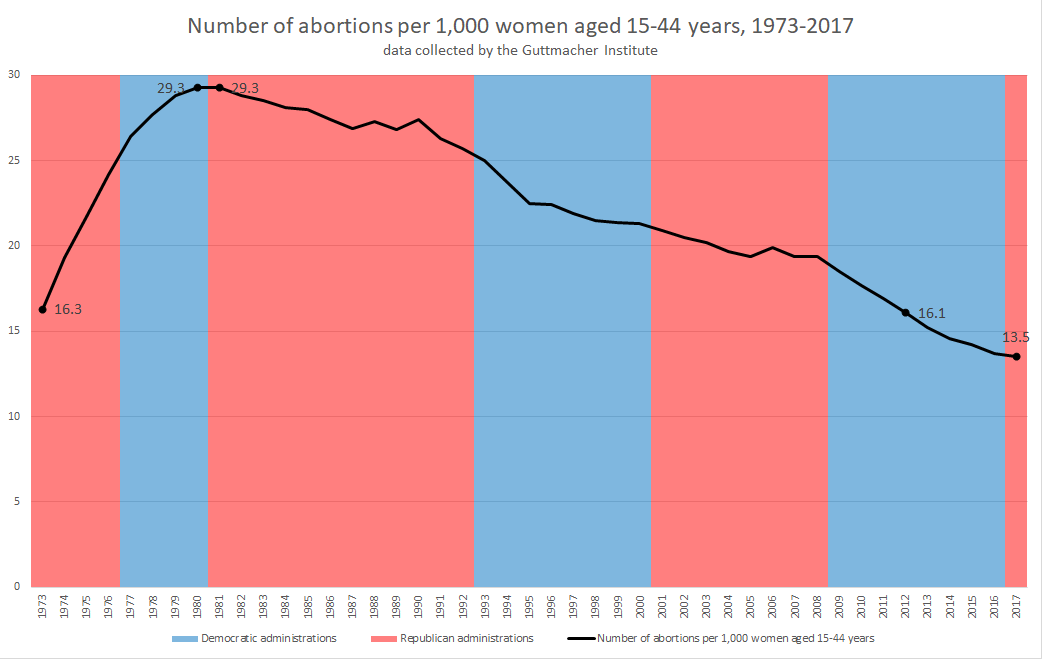
caption=Graph of U.S. abortion rates, 1973–2017, showing data collected by the Guttmacher Institute.

During the first six months of 2023 (following Dobbs in 2022), the numbers of abortions in certain U.S. states changed dramatically compared to the same time period in 2020, according to the Guttmacher Institute. Abortions tripled in New Mexico and Wyoming and more than doubled in South Carolina and Kansas. For 13 states that had banned abortion, the Guttmacher Institute had no 2023 data to make the comparison.

A report released in the journal "Health Affairs" in September 2024 states that over one million individuals in the United States suffer pregnancy loss annually, including at least 400,000 miscarriages in states where abortion is banned.

According to the Guttmacher Institute—an organization that advocates for abortion rights—approximately 91,000 abortions were performed via telehealth services in 2025 in states with total abortion bans; this figure represents an increase from 74,000 such cases in 2024.

=== Medical abortions ===
A Guttmacher Institute survey of abortion providers estimated that early medical abortions accounted for 17% of all non-hospital abortions and slightly over one-quarter of abortions before 9 weeks gestation in the United States in 2008. Medical abortions voluntarily reported to the CDC by 34 reporting areas (excluding Alabama, California, Connecticut, Delaware, Florida, Hawaii, Illinois, Louisiana, Maryland, Massachusetts, Nebraska, Nevada, New Hampshire, Pennsylvania, Tennessee, Vermont, Wisconsin, and Wyoming) and published in its annual abortion surveillance reports have increased every year since the September 28, 2000 FDA approval of mifepristone (RU-486): 1.0% in 2000, 2.9% in 2001, 5.2% in 2002, 7.9% in 2003, 9.3% in 2004, 9.9% in 2005, 10.6% in 2006, 13.1% in 2007, 15.8% in 2008, 17.1% in 2009 (25.2% of those at less than 9 weeks gestation). Medical abortions accounted for 32% of first-trimester abortions at Planned Parenthood clinics in 2008. By 2020, medication abortions accounted for more than 50% of all abortions. In 2023, medication abortions obtained within the formal health care system had risen to 63% of all abortions, with the total percentage (which would include self-managed abortions by individuals in states with total bans) likely higher.

Since the Supreme Court overturned Roe v. Wade in 2022, almost half of US states have banned or limited access to abortion. Women in these states often travel out of state or use telehealth for medication abortion, which made up 65% of US abortions in 2023. Republican-led states have challenged the drug mifepristone's approval, while the FDA plans to complete a safety review by March 2027.

New research indicates that since the June 2022 *Dobbs v. Jackson Women's Health Organization* ruling, access to pregnancy-related care—specifically regarding miscarriage management—has deteriorated in states with abortion restrictions. The study found that clinical practice in these states is shifting away from the use of medications (such as mifepristone) toward an "expectant management" (wait-and-see) approach; this results in fewer treatment options and lower-quality care for patients. Analyzing data from 123,598 individuals with private insurance, the study revealed that states with "trigger bans" saw a higher percentage of patients managed via an expectant approach (an increase of 2.8 percentage points) and a corresponding decrease in the use of medication-based management (a decrease of 2.2 percentage points).

=== Abortion and religion ===
A majority of abortions are obtained by religiously identified women. According to the Guttmacher Institute, "more than 7 in 10 U.S. women obtaining an abortion report a religious affiliation (37% Protestant, 28% Catholic, and 7% other), and 25% attend religious services at least once a month. The abortion rate for Protestant women is 15 per 1,000 women, while Catholic women have a slightly higher rate, 20 per 1,000."

=== Abortion and ethnicity ===
Abortion rates tend to be higher among minority women in the United States. In 2000–2001, the rates among black and Hispanic women were 49 per 1,000 and 33 per 1,000, respectively, vs. 13 per 1,000 among non-Hispanic white women. This figure includes all women of reproductive age, including women that are not pregnant. In other words, these abortion rates reflect the rate at which U.S. women of reproductive age have an abortion each year.

In 2004, the rates of abortion by ethnicity in the U.S. were 50 abortions per 1,000 black women, 28 abortions per 1,000 Hispanic women, and 11 abortions per 1,000 white women.

Abortion rate per 1,000 women, 2021
| Ethnicity | Abortion rate |
|---|---|
| African American women | 28.6 |
| Hispanic women | 12.3 |
| Other women | 9.2 |
| White women | 6.4 |

=== In-state vs. out-of-state ===
Roe v. Wade legalized abortion nationwide in 1973. In 1972, 41% of abortions were performed on women outside their state of residence, while in 1973 it declined to 21%, and then to 11% in 1974.

In the decade from 2011 to 2020, during which many states increased abortion restrictions, the percentage of women nationwide who traveled out of state for an abortion increased steadily, from 6% in 2011 to 9% in 2020. Out of state travel for an abortion was much more prevalent in the 29 states hostile to abortion rights, with percentages in those states rising from 9% in 2011 to 15% by 2020, while in states supportive of abortion rights, out of state travel for abortions rose from 2% to 3% between 2011 and 2020. In 2024, around 155,000 people crossed state lines for abortions, doubling the number in 2020. In several states the percentage of abortions performed within the state specifically for people who traveled from outside of the state exceeds 15%, with Kansas, New Mexico, and Washington DC exceeding 50%. Illinois performed the most out-of-state abortions in the US at 23% or 34,900 cases.

Guttmacher has released data about abortions by state of occurrence and state of residence. In some states, these numbers can be tremendously different, for example in Missouri, a state very hostile to abortion rights, the abortion rate by state of occurrence dropped from 4 in 1000 women aged 15–44 for 2017 to 0.1 for 2020, because 57% of abortion recipients went out of state in 2017, while 99% did so in 2020. In contrast, from 2017 to 2020, the abortion rate by state of residence for Missourians went up by 18% from 8.4 to 9.9.

Some out of state travel pertains to locations of population centers in states; if large cities are close to state borders it may be common to cross borders for an abortion. For example, Delaware, which is generally supportive of abortion rights, saw 44% of residents obtain their abortions in neighboring states.

=== Motherhood ===
In 2019, 60% of women who had abortions were already mothers, and 50% already had two or more children.

=== Reasons for abortions ===
A 1998 study revealed that in 1987 to 1988, women reported the following as their primary reasons for choosing an abortion:

| Percentage of women | Primary reason for choosing an abortion |
|---|---|
| 25.5% | Want to postpone childbearing |
| 21.3% | Cannot afford a baby |
| 14.1% | Has relationship problem or partner does not want pregnancy |
| 12.2% | Too young; parent(s) or other(s) object to pregnancy |
| 10.8% | Having a child will disrupt education or employment |
| 7.9% | Want no (more) children |
| 3.3% | Risk to fetal health |
| 2.8% | Risk to maternal health |
| 2.1% | Other |

The source of this information takes findings into account from 27 nations including the United States, and therefore, these findings may not be typical for any one nation.

According to a 1987 study that included specific data about late abortions (i. e., abortions "at 16 or more weeks' gestation"), women reported that various reasons contributed to their having a late abortion:

| Percentage of women | Reasons contributing to a late abortion |
|---|---|
| 71% | Woman did not recognize she was pregnant or misjudged gestation |
| 48% | Woman had found it hard to make arrangements for an earlier abortion |
| 33% | Woman was afraid to tell her partner or parents |
| 24% | Woman took time to decide to have an abortion |
| 8% | Woman waited for her relationship to change |
| 8% | Someone had earlier pressured woman not to have abortion |
| 6% | Something changed some time after woman became pregnant |
| 6% | Woman did not know timing is important |
| 5% | Woman did not know she could get an abortion |
| 2% | A fetal problem was diagnosed late in pregnancy |
| 11% | Other |

In 2000, cases of rape or incest accounted for 1% of abortions.

A 2004 study by the Guttmacher Institute reported that women listed the following amongst their reasons for choosing to have an abortion:

| Percentage of women | Reason for choosing to have an abortion |
|---|---|
| 74% | Having a baby would dramatically change my life |
| 73% | Cannot afford a baby now |
| 48% | Do not want to be a single mother or having relationship problems |
| 38% | Have completed my childbearing |
| 32% | Not ready for another child |
| 25% | Do not want people to know I had sex or got pregnant |
| 22% | Do not feel mature enough to raise a(nother) child |
| 14% | Husband or partner wants me to have an abortion |
| 13% | Possible problems affecting the health of the fetus |
| 12% | Concerns about my health |
| 6% | Parents want me to have an abortion |
| 1% | Was a victim of rape |
| less than .5% | Became pregnant as a result of incest |

A 2008 National Survey of Family Growth (NSFG) shows that rates of unintended pregnancy are highest among Blacks, Hispanics, and women with lower socio-economic status.

- 70% of all pregnancies among Black women were unintended
- 57% of all pregnancies among Hispanic women were unintended
- 42% of all pregnancies among White women were unintended

=== When women have abortions (by gestational age) ===
Abortion in the U.S. by gestational age, 2016

According to the Centers for Disease Control, in 2011, most (64.5%) abortions were performed by ≤8 weeks' gestation, and nearly all (91.4%) were performed by ≤13 weeks' gestation. Few abortions (7.3%) were performed between 14 and 20 weeks' gestation or at ≥21 weeks' gestation (1.4%). From 2002 to 2011, the percentage of all abortions performed at ≤8 weeks' gestation increased 6%.

=== Safety of abortions ===
The risk of death from carrying a child to term in the U.S. is approximately 14 times greater than the risk of death from a legal abortion. In 2012, the mortality rate from legal abortion was 0.6 abortion-related deaths per 100,000 abortions. The risk of abortion-related mortality increases with gestational age, but remains lower than that of childbirth through at least 21 weeks' gestation.

For the period 2013 – 2019, the rate of mortality from legal abortion procedures in the US was 0.43 abortion-related deaths per 100,000 reported legal abortions, lower than the rates for previous 5-year periods. In 2019, there were four identified deaths related to abortion in the US, out of 625,000 abortions.

=== Birth control effects ===
Increased access to birth control has been statistically linked to reductions in the abortion rate. As an element of family planning, birth control was federally subsidized for low income families in 1965 under President Lyndon B. Johnson's war on poverty program. In 1970, Congress passed Title X to provide family planning services for those in need, and President Richard Nixon signed it into law. Funding for Title X rose from $6 million in 1971 to $61 million the next year, and slowly increased each year to $317 million in 2010, after which it was reduced by a few percent.

In 2011, the Guttmacher Institute reported that the number of abortions in the U.S. would be nearly two-thirds higher without access to birth control. In 2015, the Federation of American Scientists reported that federally mandated access to birth control had helped reduce teenage pregnancies in the U.S. by 44 percent, and had prevented more than 188,000 unintended pregnancies.

== Public opinion ==
Trend percent of Americans self-identifying as either "pro-life" or "pro-choice"

The level of support for access to abortion has been relatively consistent since 1972. Large majorities (over 75%) support access to abortion in "traumatic" cases (rape, danger to the mother's health, or strong chance of birth defects) and approximately 40-50% support elective abortion.

According to Pew Research Center, since they began polling in 1995, those saying that abortion should be legal in "all" or "most" cases have consistently outnumbered those saying it should not. in 1995, 60% said it should be legal versus 38% who said it should not, with agreement falling to a low of 47% versus 44% in 2009, before steadily rising to an all-time high of 63% in support and 36% against.

Americans have been equally divided on the issue; a May 2018 Gallup poll indicated that 48% of Americans described themselves as "pro-choice" and 48% described themselves as "pro-life". A July 2018 poll indicated that 64% of Americans did not want the Supreme Court to overturn Roe v. Wade, while 28% did. The same poll found that support for abortion being generally legal was 60% during the first trimester of pregnancy, dropping to 28% in the second trimester, and 13% in the third trimester.

Support for the legalization of abortion has been consistently higher among more educated adults than less educated, and in 2019, 70% of college graduates support abortion being legal in all or most cases, compared to 60% of those with some college, and 54% of those with a high school degree or less.

In January 2013, a majority of Americans believed abortion should be legal in all or most cases, according to a poll by NBC News and The Wall Street Journal. Approximately 70% of respondents in the same poll opposed Roe v. Wade being overturned. A poll by the Pew Research Center yielded similar results. Moreover, 48% of Republicans opposed overturning Roe, compared to 46% who supported overturning it.

Gallup declared in May 2010 that more Americans identifying as "pro-life" is "the new normal", while also noting that there had been no increase in opposition to abortion. It suggested that political polarization may have prompted more Republicans to call themselves "pro-life". The terms "pro-choice" and "pro-life" do not always reflect a political view or fall along a binary; in one Public Religion Research Institute poll, seven in ten Americans described themselves as "pro-choice" while almost two-thirds described themselves as "pro-life". The same poll found that 56% of Americans were in favor of legal access to abortion in all or some cases.

A 2022 study reviewing the literature and public opinion datasets found that 43.8% of survey respondents in the U.S. consistently support both elective and traumatic abortion, whereas only 14.8% consistently oppose abortion irrespective of the reason, and others differ in their degree of support for abortion depending on the circumstances of the abortion. 90% approve of abortion when the health of the woman is endangered, 77.4% when there is a strong chance of defects in the baby that could result from the pregnancy, and 79.5% when the pregnancy is the result of rape.

A 2022 poll by the Pew Research Center, found that 47% polled said that women who had an illegal abortion should face a penalty. 14% said they should face jail time, 16% said a fine or community services and 17% were not sure the penalty.

After the 2022 Dobbs v. Jackson decision that overturned Roe v. Wade and significantly reduced access to abortion, dissatisfaction with the country's abortion policies rose to 69% (the highest level in 23 years), of which 46% want fewer restrictions on abortion, a significant increase from previous years. Since then, a consistent majority of the public has identified as pro-choice, with 52% identifying as pro-choice and 44% as pro-life in May 2023.

| Date of poll | "Pro-life" | "Pro-choice" | Mixed / neither | Don't know what terms mean | No opinion |
|---|---|---|---|---|---|
| 2023, May | 44% | 52% | 3% | 1% | – |
| 2016, May 4–8 | 46% | 47% | 3% | 3% | 2% |
| 2015, May 6–10 | 44% | 50% | 3% | 2% | 1% |
| 2014, May 8–11 | 46% | 47% | 3% | 3% | – |
| 2013, May 2–7 | 48% | 45% | 3% | 3% | 2% |
| 2012, May 3–6 | 50% | 41% | 4% | 3% | 3% |
| 2011, May 5–8 | 45% | 49% | 3% | 2% | 2% |
| 2010, March 26–28 | 46% | 45% | 4% | 2% | 3% |
| 2009, November 20–22 | 45% | 48% | 2% | 2% | 3% |
| 2009, May 7–10 | 51% | 42% | – | 0 | 7% |
| 2008, September 5–7 | 43% | 51% | 2% | 1% | 3% |

=== By gender and age ===
Pew Research Center polling shows little change in views from 2008 to 2012; modest differences based on gender or age.

The original article's table also shows by party affiliation, religion, and education level.

| | 2011–2012 | | | 2009–2010 | | | 2007–2008 | | |
| | Legal | Illegal | Don't Know | Legal | Illegal | Don't Know | Legal | Illegal | Don't Know |
|---|---|---|---|---|---|---|---|---|---|
| Total | 53% | 41% | 6% | 48% | 44% | 8% | 54% | 40% | 6% |
| Men | 51% | 43% | 6% | 46% | 46% | 9% | 52% | 42% | 6% |
| Women | 55% | 40% | 5% | 50% | 43% | 7% | 55% | 39% | 5% |
| 18–29 | 53% | 44% | 3% | 50% | 45% | 5% | 52% | 45% | 3% |
| 30–49 | 54% | 42% | 4% | 49% | 43% | 7% | 58% | 38% | 5% |
| 50–64 | 55% | 38% | 7% | 49% | 42% | 9% | 56% | 38% | 6% |
| 65+ | 48% | 43% | 9% | 39% | 49% | 12% | 45% | 44% | 11% |

=== By educational level ===
Support for the legalization of abortion is significantly higher among more educated adults than less educated, and has been consistently so for decades. In 2019, 70% of college graduates support abortion being legal in all or most cases, as well as 60% of those with some college education, compared to 54% of those with a high school degree or less.

2019
| Educational attainment | Legal in all or most cases | Illegal in all or most cases |
|---|---|---|
| College grad or more | 70% | 30% |
| Some college | 60% | 39% |
| High school or less | 54% | 44% |

=== By gender, party, and region ===
A January 2003 CBS News/The New York Times poll examined whether Americans thought abortion should be legal or not, and found variations in opinion which depended upon party affiliation and the region of the country. The margin of error is +/– 4% for questions answered of the entire sample (overall figures) and may be higher for questions asked of subgroups (all other figures).

| Group | Generally available | Available, but with stricter limits than now | Not permitted |
|---|---|---|---|
| Women | 37% | 37% | 24% |
| Men | 40% | 40% | 20% |
| Democrats | 43% | 35% | 21% |
| Republicans | 29% | 41% | 28% |
| Independents | 42% | 38% | 18% |
| Northeasterners | 48% | 31% | 19% |
| Midwesterners | 34% | 40% | 25% |
| Southerners | 33% | 41% | 25% |
| Westerners | 43% | 40% | 16% |
| Overall | 39% | 38% | 22% |

=== By race ===
A January 2026 poll by Pew Research found that support for legal abortion in the U.S. varies by race.

| Group | legal in all or most cases | illegal in all or most cases |
|---|---|---|
| White | 58% | 40% |
| Black | 71% | 26% |
| Hispanic | 56% | 42% |
| Asian | 73% | 27% |

=== By trimester of pregnancy ===
A CNN/USA Today/Gallup poll in January 2003 asked about the legality of abortion by trimester, using the question, "Do you think abortion should generally be legal or generally illegal during each of the following stages of pregnancy?" This same question was also asked by Gallup in March 2000 and July 1996. Polls indicates general support of legal abortion during the first trimester, although support drops dramatically for abortion during the second and third trimester.

Since the 2011 poll, support for legal abortion during the first trimester has declined.

| | 2018 Poll | | 2012 Poll | | 2011 Poll | | 2003 Poll | | 2000 Poll | | 1996 Poll | |
| | Legal | Illegal | Legal | Illegal | Legal | Illegal | Legal | Illegal | Legal | Illegal | Legal | Illegal |
| First trimester | 60% | 34% | 61% | 31% | 62% | 29% | 66% | 35% | 66% | 31% | 64% | 30% |
| Second trimester | 28% | 65% | 27% | 64% | 24% | 71% | 25% | 68% | 24% | 69% | 26% | 65% |
| Third trimester | 13% | 81% | 14% | 80% | 10% | 86% | 10% | 84% | 8% | 86% | 13% | 82% |

=== By circumstance or reasons ===
According to Gallup's long-time polling on abortion, the majority of Americans are neither strictly "pro-life" or "pro-choice"; it depends upon the circumstances of the pregnancy. Gallup polling from 1996 to 2021 consistently reveals that when asked the question, "Do you think abortions should be legal under any circumstances, legal only under certain circumstances, or illegal in all circumstances?", Americans repeatedly answer "legal only under certain circumstances". According to the poll, in any given year 48–57% say legal only under certain circumstances, 21–34% say legal under any circumstances, and 13–19% illegal in all circumstances, with 1–7% having no opinion.

| | Legal under any circumstances | Legal only under certain circumstances | Illegal in all circumstances | No opinion |
|---|---|---|---|---|
| 2021 May 3–18 | 32% | 48% | 19% | 2% |
| 2020 May 1–13 | 29% | 50% | 20% | 2% |
| 2019 May 1–12 | 25% | 53% | 21% | 2% |
| 2018 May 1–10 | 29% | 50% | 18% | 2% |
| 2017 May 3–7 | 29% | 50% | 18% | 3% |
| 2016 May 4–8 | 29% | 50% | 19% | 2% |
| 2015 May 6–10 | 29% | 51% | 19% | 1% |
| 2014 May 8–11 | 28% | 50% | 21% | 2% |
| 2013 May 2–7 | 26% | 52% | 20% | 2% |
| 2012 Dec 27–30 | 28% | 52% | 18% | 3% |
| 2012 May 3–6 | 25% | 52% | 20% | 3% |
| 2011 Jul 15–17 | 26% | 51% | 20% | 3% |
| 2011 June 9–12 | 26% | 52% | 21% | 2% |
| 2011 May 5–8 | 27% | 49% | 22% | 3% |
| 2009 Jul 17–19 | 21% | 57% | 18% | 4% |
| 2009 May 7–10 | 22% | 53% | 23% | 2% |
| 2008 May 8–11 | 28% | 54% | 18% | 2% |
| 2007 May 10–13 | 26% | 55% | 17% | 1% |
| 2006 May 8–11 | 30% | 53% | 15% | 2% |

According to the aforementioned poll, Americans differ drastically based upon situation of the pregnancy, suggesting they do not support unconditional abortions. Based on two separate polls taken May 19–21, 2003, of 505 and 509 respondents respectively, Americans stated their approval for abortion under these various circumstances:

| Poll Criteria | Total | Poll A | Poll B |
|---|---|---|---|
| When the woman's life is endangered | 78% | 82% | 75% |
| When the pregnancy was caused by rape or incest | 65% | 72% | 59% |
| When the child would be born with a life-threatening illness | 54% | 60% | 48% |
| When the child would be born mentally disabled | 44% | 50% | 38% |
| When the woman does not want the child for any reason | 32% | 41% | 24% |

Another separate trio of polls taken by Gallup in 2003, 2000, and 1996, revealed public support for abortion as follows for the given criteria:

| Poll criteria | 2003 Poll | 2000 Poll | 1996 Poll |
|---|---|---|---|
| When the woman's life is endangered | 85% | 84% | 88% |
| When the woman's physical health is endangered | 77% | 81% | 82% |
| When the pregnancy was caused by rape or incest | 76% | 78% | 77% |
| When the woman's mental health is endangered | 63% | 64% | 66% |
| When there is evidence that the baby may be physically impaired | 56% | 53% | 53% |
| When there is evidence that the baby may be mentally impaired | 55% | 53% | 54% |
| When the woman or family cannot afford to raise the child | 35% | 34% | 32% |

Gallup furthermore established public support for many issues supported by the anti-abortion community and opposed by the abortion rights community:

| Legislation | 2011 Poll | 2003 Poll | 2000 Poll | 1996 Poll |
|---|---|---|---|---|
| A law requiring doctors to inform patients about alternatives to abortion before performing the procedure | | 88% | 86% | 86% |
| A law requiring women seeking abortions to wait 24 hours before having the procedure done | 69% | 78% | 74% | 73% |

| Legislation | 2005 Poll | 2003 Poll | 1996 Poll | 1992 Poll |
|---|---|---|---|---|
| A law requiring women under 18 to get parental consent for any abortion | 69% | 73% | 74% | 70% |
| A law requiring that the husband of a married woman be notified if she decides to have an abortion | 64% | 72% | 70% | 73% |

An October 2007 CBS News poll explored under what circumstances Americans believe abortion should be allowed, asking the question, "What is your personal feeling about abortion?" The results were as follows:

| Permitted in all cases | Permitted, but subject to greater restrictions than it is now | Only in cases such as rape, incest, or to save the woman's life | Only permitted to save the woman's life | Never | Unsure |
|---|---|---|---|---|---|
| 26% | 16% | 34% | 16% | 4% | 4% |

=== Additional polls ===
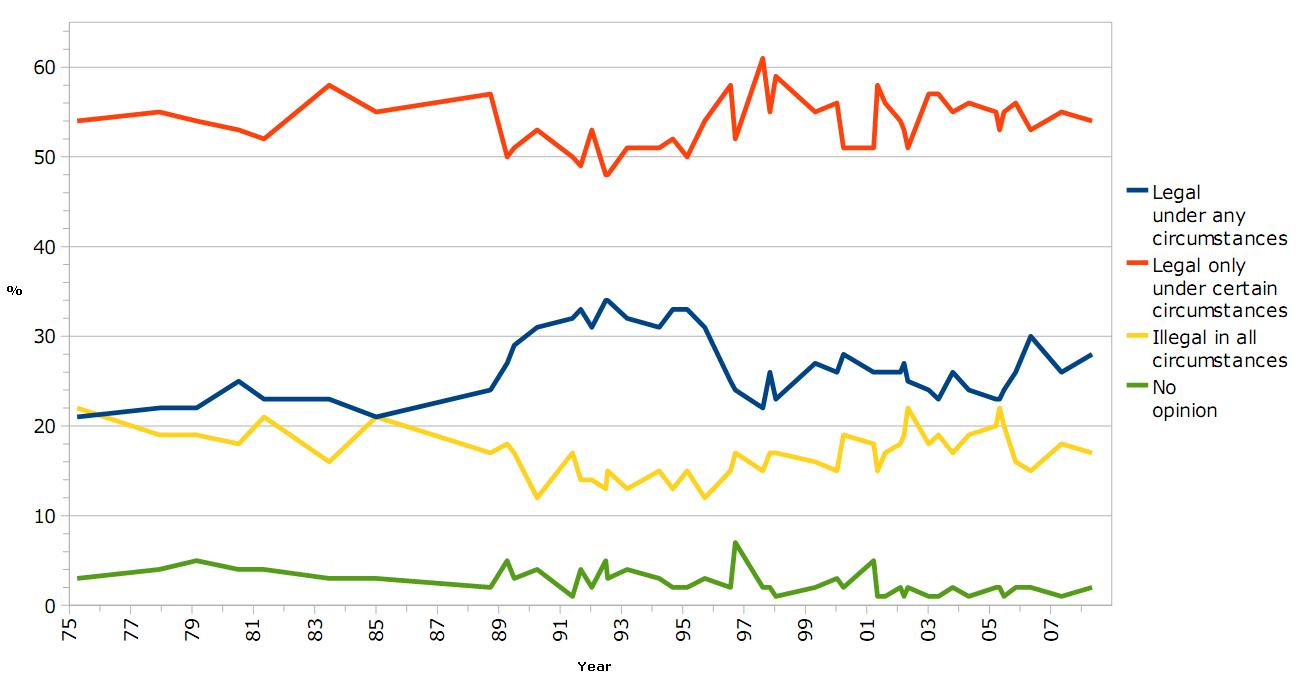
Results of Gallup opinion poll in the U.S. since 1975, legal restriction of abortion

- A June 2000 Los Angeles Times survey found that, although 57% of polltakers considered abortion to be murder, half of that 57% believed in allowing women access to abortion. The survey also found that, overall, 65% of respondents did not believe abortion should be legal after the first trimester, including 72% of women and 58% of men. Further, the survey found that 85% of Americans polled supported abortion in cases of risk to a woman's physical health, 54% if the woman's mental health was at risk, and 66% if a congenital abnormality was detected in the fetus.
- A July 2002 Public Agenda poll found that 44% of men and 42% of women thought that "abortion should be generally available to those who want it", 34% of men and 35% of women thought that "abortion should be available, but under stricter than limits it is now", and 21% of men and 22% of women thought that "abortion should not be permitted".
- A January 2003 ABC News/The Washington Post poll also examined attitudes towards abortion by gender. In answer to the question, "On the subject of abortion, do you think abortion should be legal in all cases, legal in most cases, illegal in most cases or illegal in all cases?", 25% of women responded that it should be legal in "all cases", 33% that it should be legal in "most cases", 23% that it should be illegal in "most cases", and 17% that it should be illegal in "all cases". 20% of men thought it should be legal in "all cases", 34% legal in "most cases", 27% illegal in "most cases", and 17% illegal in "all cases".
- Most Fox News viewers favor both parental notification as well as parental consent, when a minor seeks an abortion. A Fox News poll in 2005 found that 78% of people favor a notification requirement, and 72% favor a consent requirement.
- An April 2006 Harris poll on Roe v. Wade, asked, "In 1973, the U.S. Supreme Court decided that states' laws which made it illegal for a woman to have an abortion up to three months of pregnancy were unconstitutional, and that the decision on whether a woman should have an abortion up to three months of pregnancy should be left to the woman and her doctor to decide. In general, do you favor or oppose this part of the U.S. Supreme Court decision making abortions up to three months of pregnancy legal?", to which 49% of respondents indicated favor while 47% indicated opposition. The Harris organization has concluded from this poll that, "49 percent now support Roe vs. Wade".
- Two polls were released in May 2007 asking Americans "With respect to the abortion issue, would you consider yourself to be pro-choice or pro-life?" May 4–6, a CNN poll found 45% said "pro-choice" and 50% said pro-life. Within the following week, a Gallup poll found 50% responding "pro-choice" and 44% pro-life.
- In 2011, a poll conducted by the Public Religion Research Institute found that 43% of respondents identified themselves as both "pro-life" and "pro-choice".

=== Intact dilation and extraction ===
In 2003, the U.S. Congress outlawed intact dilation and extraction when it passed the Partial-Birth Abortion Ban Act. A Rasmussen Reports poll four days after the Supreme Court's opinion in Gonzales v. Carhart found that 40% of respondents "knew the ruling allowed states to place some restrictions on specific abortion procedures." Of those who knew of the decision, 56% agreed with the decision and 32% were opposed. An ABC poll from 2003 found that 62% of respondents thought "partial-birth abortion" should be illegal; a similar number of respondents wanted an exception "if it would prevent a serious threat to the woman's health".

Gallup has repeatedly queried the American public on this issue.

| Legislation | 2011 | 2003 | 2000 | 2000 | 2000 | 1999 | 1998 | 1997 | 1996 |
|---|---|---|---|---|---|---|---|---|---|
| A law that would make it illegal to perform a specific abortion procedure conducted in the last six months, or second and/or third trimester of pregnancy, known by some opponents as a partial birth abortion, except in cases necessary to save the life of the mother | 64% | 70% | 63% | 66% | 64% | 61% | 61% | 55% | 57% |

== Positions of political parties ==
After Roe, there was a national political realignment surrounding abortion. The abortion-rights movement in the United States initially emphasized the national policy benefits of abortion, such as smaller welfare expenses, slower population growth, and fewer illegitimate births. The abortion-rights movement drew support from the population control movement, feminists, and environmentalists. Anti-abortion advocates and civil-rights activists accused abortion-rights supporters of intending to control the population of racial minorities and the disabled, citing their ties to racial segregationists and eugenicist legal reformers. The abortion-rights movement subsequently distanced from the population control movement, and responded by taking up choice-based and rights-oriented rhetoric similar to what was used in the Roe decision. Opponents of abortion experienced a political shift. The Catholic Church and the Democratic Party supported an expansive welfare state, wanted to reduce rates of abortion through prenatal insurance and federally funded day care, and opposed abortion at the time of Roe. Afterwards, the anti-abortion movement in the United States shifted more to Protestant faiths that saw abortion rights as part of a liberal-heavy agenda to fight against, and became part of the new Christian right. The Protestant influence helped make opposition to abortion part of the Republican Party's platform by the 1990s. Republican-led states enacted laws to restrict abortion, including abortions earlier than Casey's general standard of 24 weeks.

Into the 21st century, although members of both major U.S. political parties come down on either side of the issue, the Republican Party is often seen as being anti-abortion, since the official party platform opposes abortion and considers fetuses to have an inherent right to life. Republicans for Choice represents the minority of that party. In 2006, pollsters found that 9% of Republicans favor the availability of abortion in most circumstances. Of Republican National Convention delegates in 2004, 13% believed that abortion should be generally available, and 38% believed that it should not be permitted. The same poll showed that 17% of all Republican voters believed that abortion should be generally available to those who want it, while 38% believed that it should not be permitted. The Republican Party was supportive of abortion rights prior to 1976 Republican National Convention, at which they supported an anti-abortion constitutional amendment as a temporary political ploy to gain more support from Catholics; this stance brought many more social conservatives into the party resulting in a large and permanent shift toward support of the anti-abortion position. The Democratic Party platform considers abortion to be a woman's right. Democrats for Life of America represents the minority of that party. In 2006, pollsters found that 74% of Democrats favor the availability of abortion in most circumstances. Of Democratic National Convention delegates in 2004, 75% believed that abortion should be generally available, and 2% believed that abortion should not be permitted. The same poll showed that 49% of all Democratic voters believed that abortion should be generally available to those who want it, while 13% believed that it should not be permitted.

The position of U.S. third political parties and other U.S. minor political parties is diverse. The Green Party supports legal abortion as a woman's right. While abortion is a contentious issue and the Maryland-based Libertarians for Life opposes the legality of abortion in most circumstances, the Libertarian Party platform (2012) stated that "government should be kept out of the matter, leaving the question to each person for their conscientious consideration." In 2022, the Libertarian Party removed all mentions of abortion in their platform. The Constitution Party is opposed to abortion.

The issue of abortion has become deeply politicized. In 2002, 84% of state Democratic platforms supported the right to having an abortion while 88% of state Republican platforms opposed it. This divergence also led to Christian right organizations like Christian Voice, Christian Coalition of America, and Moral Majority having an increasingly strong role in the Republican Party. This opposition has been extended under the Foreign Assistance Act; in 1973, Jesse Helms introduced an amendment banning the use of aid money to promote abortion overseas, and in 1984 the Mexico City policy prohibited financial support to any overseas organization that performed or promoted abortions. The policy was revoked by President Bill Clinton and subsequently reinstated by President George W. Bush. President Barack Obama overruled this policy by Executive Order on January 23, 2009, and it was reinstated on January 23, 2017, by President Donald Trump. On January 28, 2021, President Joe Biden signed a Presidential Memorandum that repealed the restoration of Mexico City policy and also called for the United States Department of Health and Human Services to "suspend, rescind or revoke" restrictions made to Title X. President Donald Trump reinstated the policy on January 24, 2025.

== Effects of legalization and impact of abortion bans ==
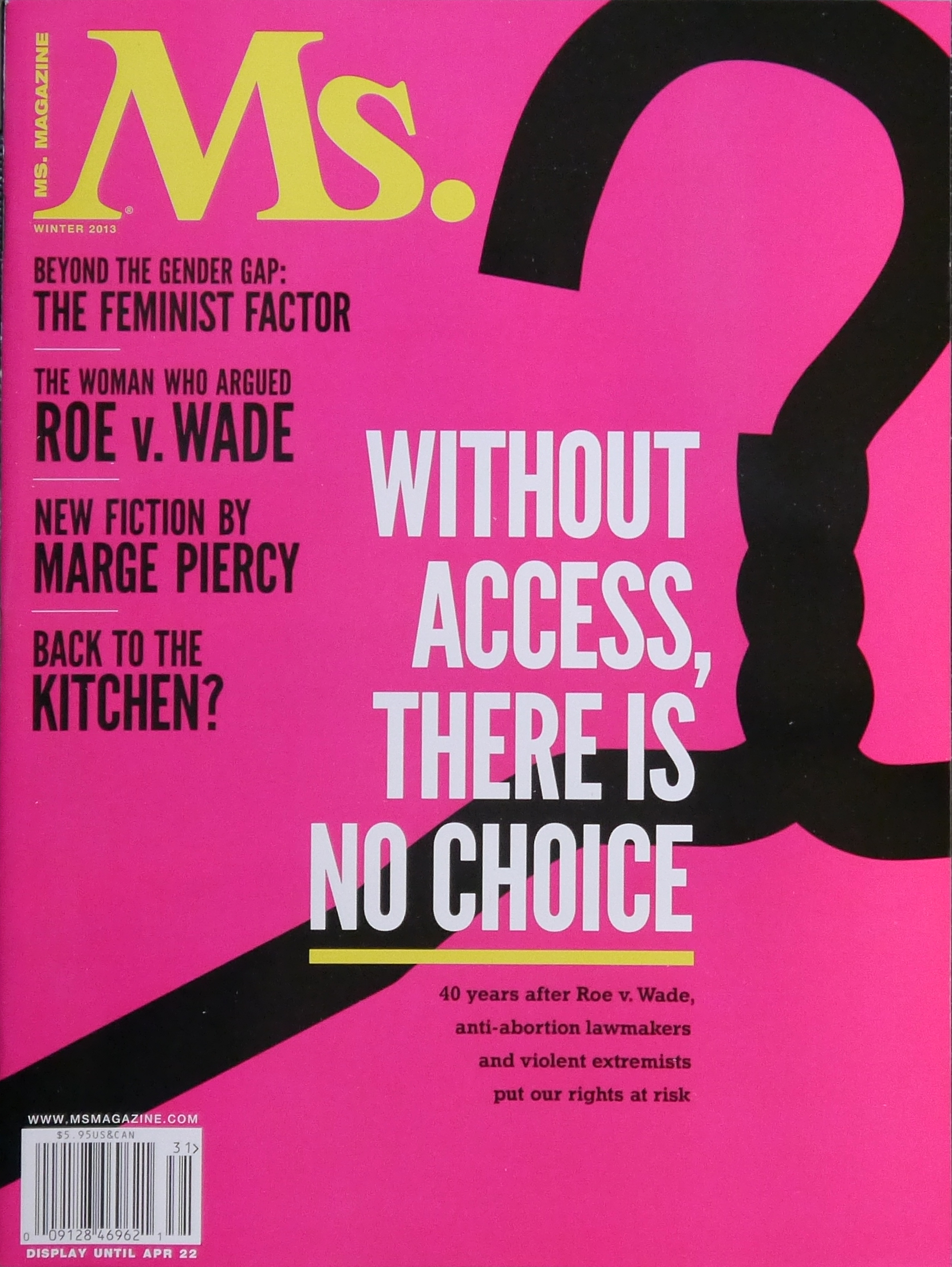
The 2013 winter issue of Ms. was about abortion rights.

The risk of death due to legal abortion has fallen considerably since Roe v. Wade (1973) legalized it; this was due to increased physician skills, improved medical technology, and earlier termination of pregnancy. From 1940 through 1970, annual deaths of pregnant women during abortion fell from nearly 1,500 to a little over 100. According to the Centers for Disease Control and Prevention, the number of women who died in 1972 from illegal abortion was thirty-nine. The Roe effect is a hypothesis suggesting that since supporters of abortion rights cause the erosion of their own political base by having fewer children, the practice of abortion will eventually lead to the restriction or illegalization of abortion. The legalized abortion and crime effect is another controversial theory that posits legal abortion reduces crime because unwanted children are more likely to become criminals.

Since Roe, there have been numerous attempts to reverse the decision. In the 2011 election season, Mississippi placed an amendment on the ballot that redefined how the state viewed abortion. The personhood amendment defined personhood as "every human being from the moment of fertilization, cloning or the functional equivalent thereof"; if passed, it would have been illegal to get an abortion in the state. On July 11, 2012, a Mississippi federal judge ordered an extension of his temporary order to allow the state's only abortion clinic to stay open. The order was to stay in place until U.S. District Judge Daniel Porter Jordan III could review newly drafted rules on how the Mississippi Department of Health would administer a new abortion law. The law in question came into effect on July 1, 2012.

Between 2008 and 2016, the Turnaway Study followed a group of 1,000 women, two of whom died after giving birth, for five years after they sought an abortion, and compared their health and socio-economic consequences of receiving an abortion or being denied one. The study found that those who were provided with abortion performed better, and those who were denied one suffered negative consequences. Scientific American described it as landmark. A follow-up Turnaway Study was confirmed to determinate the health and economic impact of Roe being overturned, which other scholars also analyzed. According to a 2019 study, were Roe reversed and abortion bans implemented in states with trigger laws, including states considered highly likely to ban abortion, "increases in travel distance are estimated to prevent 93,546 to 143,561 women from accessing abortion care."

For the Dobbs v. Jackson Women's Health Organization case, which confirmed the May 2022 leaks obtained by Politico and overruled Roe and Planned Parenthood v. Casey in June 2022, among the over 130 amici curiae briefs, hundreds of scientists provided evidence, data, and studies, in particular the Turnaway Study, in favor of abortion rights and to rebuke arguments made to the Court that abortion "has no beneficial effect on women's lives and careers—and might even cause them harm". The American Historical Association (AHA) and the Organization of American Historians (OAH) were among those who signed an amici curiae brief for Dobbs, and were cited, among others, by Reason, Syracuse University News, and The Washington Post. AHA and OAH jointly issued a statement against the Supreme Court's decision, which was reported by Anchorage Daily News, Inside Higher Ed, Insight Into Diversity, and the Strict Scrutiny podcast from Crooked Media, saying they have "declined to take seriously the historical claims of our [amicus curiae] brief". Joined by at least 30 other academic and scholarly institutions, they condemned "the court's misinterpretation about the history of legalized abortion" and said it has "the potential to exacerbate historic injustices and deepen inequalities in our country".

=== Travel to Mexico ===
Availability of abortion in Mexican states. Illegal but providers are not prosecuted Legal during first 12 weeks LMP

In the wake of state abortion bans and restrictions in the United States, Americans have started traveling to Mexico for abortions, and Mexico has expressed a willingness to help.

Due to a unanimous 2021 Supreme Court of Justice of the Nation decision that penalties for abortion violate women's rights, abortion-providers are not prosecuted even in states where abortion remains illegal under state law; there are also legal exemptions for rape and medical reasons, and a police report is not required for a rape exemption. Providers openly treat American travelers in several states where abortion remains technically illegal, such as Nuevo Leon, which neighbors Texas. Following the Supreme Court ruling, abortion is being gradually legalized at the state level, and as of 2025 is legal during the first trimester (before the 13th week after implantation) in twenty states and Mexico City.

== Unintended live birth ==
Although it is uncommon, women sometimes give birth in spite of an attempted abortion. Reporting of live birth after attempted abortion may not be consistent from state to state, but 38 were recorded in one study in upstate New York in the two-and-a-half years before Roe v. Wade. Under the Born-Alive Infants Protection Act of 2002, medical staff must report live birth if they observe any breathing, heartbeat, umbilical cord pulsation, or confirmed voluntary muscle movement, regardless of whether the born-alive is non-viable ex utero in the long term because of birth defects, and regardless of gestational age, including gestational ages which are too early for long-term viability ex utero.

== See also ==
- Abortion and the Catholic Church in the United States
- Abortion in Europe – Comparative overview of abortion law and practice
- Abortion law – Laws that allow, prohibit, or regulate abortion
- Abortion law in the United States by state
- Adoption in the United States
- Anti-abortion violence in the United States – Violence against providers of abortion services
- Christian views on abortion – Christian denominational views on the issue of abortion
- Feminism in the United States
- Heartbeat bill – Legislation intending to ban abortions after the conceptus' heartbeat can be detected
- Initiatives and referendums in the United States
- Religion and abortion
- Reproductive rights – Legal rights and freedoms relating to reproduction and reproductive health
- Types of abortion restrictions in the United States
- Waiting period – Time between requesting or mandating an action and its occurrence
- War on women – Slogan in United States politics
