= Gerardo Flores =

Gerardo Flores may refer to:

- Gerardo Humberto Flores Reyes (1925–2022), Guatemalan Roman Catholic prelate
- Gerardo Flores (footballer), Mexican footballer
- Gerardo Flores (murderer) (born 1986), American murderer
