= Maher v. Roe =

- Supreme Court of the United States

Argued November 9, 1976 Decided April 26, 1977
- Full case name: Edward Maher, Commissioner of Social Services of Connecticut, et al. v. Roe et al.
- Citations: 432 U.S. 464 (more) 97 S. Ct. 2376, 53 L. Ed. 2d 484 (1977)
- Related cases: Roe v. Wade
- Argument: Oral argument
- Opinion announcement: Opinion announcement

Case history
- Subsequent: States are not constitutionally required to fund non-therapeutic abortions when they fund childbirth through Medicaid or welfare programs.

Questions presented
- Whether Medicaid must fund non-therapeutic abortions if childbirth is covered.

Holding
- States may withhold funding for non-therapeutic abortions without constitutional violation.

Court membership
- Chief Justice Warren E. Burger Associate Justices William J. Brennan Jr. · Potter Stewart; Byron White · Thurgood Marshall; Harry Blackmun · Lewis F. Powell Jr. William Rehnquist · John P. Stevens

Case opinions
- Majority: Powell, Jr., joined by Burger, Stewart, White, Rehnquist, Stevens
- Concurrence: Burger
- Dissent: Brennan, joined by Marshall, Blackmun

Laws applied
- Title XIX of the Social Security Act (Medicaid) and the Fourteenth Amendment (due process and equal protection)

Maher v. Roe, 432 U.S. 464 (1977), is a U.S. Supreme Court decision that addressed a Connecticut regulation denying Medicaid funding for nontherapeutic (elective) abortions while permitting funding for childbirth. The court held that, although the Constitution protects a woman’s right to choose an abortion, it does not require the government to subsidize the exercise of that right. The decision established a critical distinction between state interference with a constitutional right and a state's decision not to fund that right, shaping the non-entitlement funding doctrine in constitutional law.

== Background ==
Following the Supreme Court's decision in Roe v. Wade (1973), which recognized a woman’s right to choose abortion as a fundamental liberty protected by the Fourteenth Amendment, questions arose about the extent to which states were obligated to fund abortion services. In Connecticut, the Department of Social Services issued a regulation allowing Medicaid reimbursement only for medically necessary abortions, excluding those sought for elective reasons. A group of Medicaid-eligible women challenged the regulation, claiming it violated the Equal Protection and Due Process Clauses of the Fourteenth Amendment.

== Argument ==
=== Plaintiff's position ===
Roe argued Connecticut's policy imposed a financial barrier to the constitutional right of abortion for indigent women, creating unequal access. Roe alleged that by reimbursing childbirth while withholding funding for elective abortions, the state effectively pressed poor women and penalized the exercise of their privacy rights, violating both due process and equal protection.

=== Defendant's defense ===
Connecticut responded that it did not outlaw abortion or interfere with access, but rather it exercised discretion in allocating limited public spending. The state maintained that financial need did not amount to a suspect classification under Equal Protection, and that its funding preference reflected a legitimate state interest such as conserving public funds and promoting childbirth. By declining to subsidize elective abortion, Connecticut argued it had not imposed a constitutional obstacle but simply opted not to support one course of action over another.

=== Legal doctrine ===
Law scholars such as Alan J. Shefler emphasize that Maher narrowed the right to privacy recognized in Roe, highlighting that indigency does not elevate funding rights into constitutionally protected categories. Similarly, Amelia Bailey, in her University of Michigan Gender & Law note (2016), critiques the Court’s refusal to apply equal protection to indigent women, arguing that Maher and Harris represented missed opportunities to frame abortion access through an equality lens rather than solely through privacy doctrine.

== Lower courts ==
The U.S. District Court for the District of Connecticut found the regulation unconstitutional, which determined that it effectively penalized the exercise of a fundamental right by refusing to fund elective abortions while covering childbirth. The court concluded that the regulation imposed an undue burden on the right to privacy recognized in Roe v. Wade.

== Supreme Court decision ==
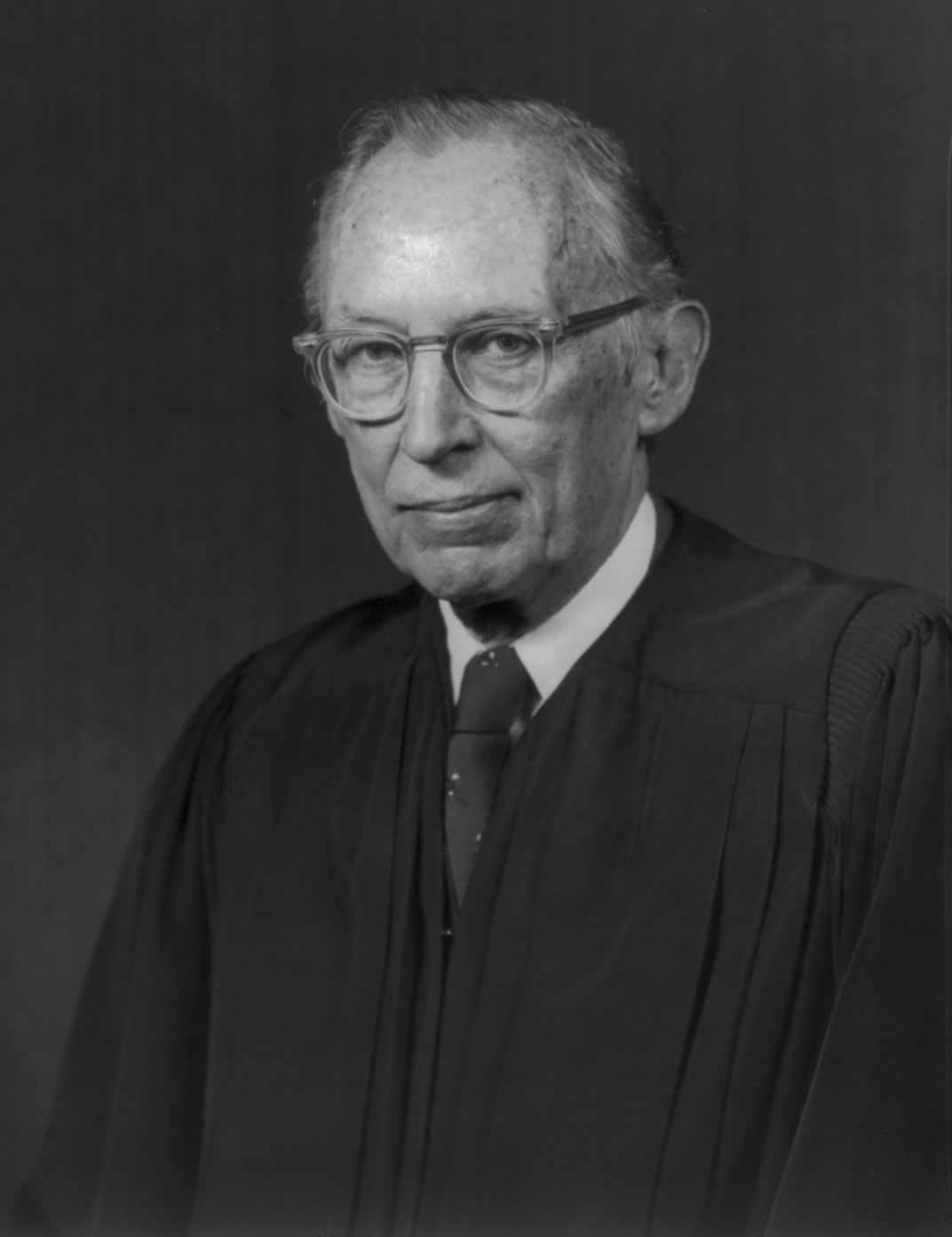
Justice Lewis F. Powell Jr. authored the majority opinion of the Court.

In a 6-3 voting decision, the Supreme Court reversed the lower court. Justice Powell explained that the Constitution "imposes no obligation on the States to pay the pregnancy-related medical expenses of indigent women".

- The funding policy did not violate Equal Protection since indigent women do not constitute a suspect class, and the policy satisfied rational-basis review by promoting state interests in potential life.
- The refusal to fund elective abortions did not infringe Due Process, since the right to abortion remained constitutionally protected but not guaranteed through public funding.

=== Dissents ===
Justice Willian J. Brennan, Jr. dissented from the majority opinion. He was joined by Justice Thurgood Marshall, and Justice Harry A. Blackmun. They challenged the majority's reasoning and raised constitutional concerns about the practical impact of the decision.

==== Dissent ====
- The dissent criticized the state's decision to fund childbirth, but not nontherapeutic abortion arguing that this essentially coerces indigent women into carrying pregnancies to term. They contented a violation to the right of privacy under the Due Process Clause.
- By placing financial burdens on indigent women seeking abortions such as requiring medical necessity certificates, the regulation discriminated against them. Contented to create an unequal access, effectively undermining their constitutional rights.

== Significance ==
Maher v. Roe introduced a crucial doctrinal concept: that constitutional rights do not inherently carry with them an entitlement to government funding. In the Harris v. McRae (1980) case, the Supreme Court upheld the Hyde Amendment, which restricted federal Medicaid funding for most abortions. This connection leads to the "non-entitlement funding doctrine" which relates to the Maher v. Roe case as well.

Between governmental interference and government inaction, the distinction continues to influence constitutional and administrative law. Scholars such as Katherine Shaw and Melissa Murray have examined how this reasoning laid the foundation for broader state discretion in reproductive policy. Both Scholars argue that this deference to state-level policymaking helped pave the way for the eventual overruling of Roe in Dobbs v. Jackson Women’s Health Organization, though Maher itself did not alter the tests used to evaluate the right to an abortion at the time.

== See also ==
- Roe v. Wade, 410 U.S. 113 (1973)
- Harris v. McRae, 448 U.S. 297 (1980)
- Beal v. Doe, 432 U.S. 438 (1977)
- Dobbs v. Jackson Women's Health Organization, 597 U.S (2022)
