= List of United States Supreme Court cases, volume 432 =

This is a list of all the United States Supreme Court cases from volume 432 of the United States Reports:

Case name	Citation	Date decided
Nyquist v. Mauclet	432 U.S. 1	1977
Lee v. United States	432 U.S. 23	1977
United States v. California	432 U.S. 40	1977
National Socialist Party of America v. Village of Skokie	432 U.S. 43	1977
E.I. du Pont de Nemours & Co. v. Collins	432 U.S. 46	1977
TWA v. Hardison	432 U.S. 63	1977
Manson v. Brathwaite	432 U.S. 98	1977
Jeffers v. United States	432 U.S. 137	1977
Brown v. Ohio	432 U.S. 161	1977
Mandel v. Bradley	432 U.S. 173	1977
Jones v. Hildebrant	432 U.S. 183	1977
Patterson v. New York	432 U.S. 197	1977
Hankerson v. North Carolina	432 U.S. 233	1977
Ne. Marine Terminal Co. v. Caputo	432 U.S. 249	1977
Dobbert v. Florida	432 U.S. 282	1977
Third Nat'l Bank v. Impac Limited, Inc.	432 U.S. 312	1977
Hunt v. Wash. State Apple Advert. Comm'n	432 U.S. 333	1977
Occidental Life Ins. Co. v. EEOC	432 U.S. 355	1977
United Airlines, Inc. v. McDonald	432 U.S. 385	1977
Briscoe v. Bell	432 U.S. 404	1977
Batterton v. Francis	432 U.S. 416	1977
Beal v. Doe	432 U.S. 438	1977
Maher v. Roe	432 U.S. 464	1977
Morris v. Gressette	432 U.S. 491	1977
Poelker v. Doe	432 U.S. 519	1977
Maher v. Doe	432 U.S. 526	1977
