= Hunt v. Washington State Apple Advertising Commission =

- Supreme Court of the United States

Argued February 22, 1977 Decided June 20, 1977
- Full case name: Hunt, Governor of North Carolina, et al. v. Washington State Apple Advertising Commission
- Citations: 432 U.S. 333 (more) 97 S. Ct. 2434; 53 L. Ed. 2d 383; 1977 U.S. LEXIS 123

Case history
- Prior: Washington State Apple Advertising Comm'n v. Holshouser, 408 F. Supp. 857 (E.D.N.C. 1976)

Holding
- North Carolina violated the Commerce Clause by discriminating against out-of-state apple growers.

Court membership
- Chief Justice Warren E. Burger Associate Justices William J. Brennan Jr. · Potter Stewart; Byron White · Thurgood Marshall; Harry Blackmun · Lewis F. Powell Jr. William Rehnquist · John P. Stevens

Case opinion
- Majority: Burger, joined by unanimous court
- Rehnquist took no part in the consideration or decision of the case.

Laws applied
- U.S. Const. art. I § 8 cl. 3 (Commerce Clause)

Hunt v. Washington State Apple Advertising Commission, 432 U.S. 333 (1977), was a case in which the Supreme Court of the United States unanimously struck down a North Carolina law prohibiting the sale of apples in closed containers marked with any apple grade other than the United States Department of Agriculture grade. However, displaying the USDA grade was not required. Washington state, a major apple producer, used apple standards superior to those used by the USDA. The Court found that North Carolina's law violated the Commerce Clause because they discriminated against Washington state apple producers while working to the advantage of local North Carolina apple growers.

John R. Jordan, Jr., argued the cause for Hunt. With him on the brief were Rufus L. Edmisten, Attorney General of North Carolina, and Millard R. Rich, Jr., Deputy Attorney General. Slade Gorton, Attorney General of Washington, argued the cause for the Washington State Apple Advertising Commission. With him on the brief were Edward B. Mackie, Deputy Attorney General, and James Arneil, Special Assistant Attorney General.

The Supreme Court decision established the concept of association standing, which allows for an association (in this case, the Commission) that represents one or more parties that have demonstrable injury to bring the case to trial with standing under Article III.

== See also ==
- List of United States Supreme Court cases, volume 432
