= Nyquist v. Mauclet =

U.S. Supreme Court Case

- Supreme Court of the United States

Argued March 22, 1977 Decided June 13, 1977
- Full case name: Nyquist v. Mauclet
- Docket no.: 76-208
- Citations: 432 U.S. 1 (more)
- Argument: Oral argument
- Opinion announcement: Opinion announcement

Court membership
- Chief Justice Warren E. Burger Associate Justices William J. Brennan Jr. · Potter Stewart; Byron White · Thurgood Marshall; Harry Blackmun · Lewis F. Powell Jr. William Rehnquist · John P. Stevens

Case opinions
- Majority: Blackmun, joined by Brennan, White, Marshall, Stevens
- Dissent: Burger
- Dissent: Powell, joined by Burger, Stewart
- Dissent: Rehnquist, joined by Burger

Nyquist v. Mauclet, 432 U.S. 1 (1977), is a United States Supreme Court case where the court ruled on whether state governments have the authority to deny permanent immigrants access to tuition assistance or loans for higher educational institutions. In a five to four decision, the court sided with Mauclet and ruled that such action is considered discriminatory against those with an immigrant status. This case brought forth important questions about whether the denial of education benefits to immigrants could be considered a form of discrimination as well as reaffirmed the federal government's authority over states in cases of immigration law.

== Background ==
Jean-Marie Mauclet and Alan Rabinovitch both immigrated to the United States and had permanent resident status. Mauclet was a French citizen and Rabinovitch was a Canadian citizen. Because they refused to give up their citizenship from their country of origin, they could not be naturalized. Both were attending college in the state of New York. Mauclet at the University of Buffalo and Rabinovitch at Brooklyn College. Mauclet applied for tuition assistance and was denied access. Rabinovitch received a Regents Scholarship, but it was revoked. This was because of Section 661(3) of the New York Education Law which required three qualifications be met in order to be eligible for tuition assistance and student loans in the State of New York: The applicant must be a citizen, have applied to become a citizen, or intend to apply for citizenship as soon as eligible. Mauclet and Rabinovitch sued the New York Commission of Education through the U.S. District Court. The district court granted the plaintiffs a motion for an injunction. The matter was then appealed to the Supreme Court.

== Details of case ==
Based on the facts of this case, the main issues being called into question is as follows: By denying immigrant access to scholarship funding and student loans for higher education, does the New York Education Law violate the Fourteenth Amendment's Equal Protection Clause?

The two sides argued their case surrounding these two questions. The state's main arguments were as follows:

1. By requiring immigrants to be citizens in order to access education benefits, the state was providing an incentive for immigrants to become naturalized.
2. Because those that could receive education benefits had to be citizens, the state was enhancing the education level of the voting public.
3. Because immigrants were eligible to apply for citizenship, the state was not discriminating against them by making citizenship status a provision for education assistance. There was a route to access the benefits

Mauclet and Rabinovitch's main arguments were as follows:

1. The law denies access based on immigration status therefore it is explicitly discriminatory.
2. States do not have the jurisdiction to create regulations surrounding immigration. That power is granted to the Federal government.
3. The policy did not specify the education of the voting population as a specific objective during the passage of the law.

=== Opinion of the Court ===
Because the case involved a question of the Equal Protection Clause, it was reviewed under a legal standard used by courts called "strict scrutiny". This test is applied to laws that deny or grant additional social resources to a particular identity group. In order to pass the test, a law has to be proven to exist for "government interest." Using this framework, the court ruled in favor of Mauclet and Rabinovitch finding the law did violate the Equal Protection Clause of the Fourteenth Amendment.

Justice Blackmun was a strong proponent for reviewing this case under "strict scrutiny" and agreed the New York Education Law did not meet the standard. Notably he stated: "661(3) is directed at aliens and that only aliens are harmed by it. The fact that the statute is not an absolute bar does not mean that it does not discriminate against the class." The court's ruling also discussed the state's lack of jurisdiction in legislating on a matter of immigration (a power reserved for the federal government) and the unjust nature of requiring immigrants to pay taxes without giving them access to the benefits of public assistance programs. They referenced court cases such as Graham v. Richardson 403 U.S. 365 (1971) and Sugarman v. Dougall 413 U.S. 634 (1973) in the ruling.

=== Dissenting opinions ===
There were two notable dissenting arguments in this case: Chief Justice Burger and Justice Rehnquist. Chief Justice Burger felt the use of "strict scrutiny" as the standard was improper for this case. In his opinion, he discussed how in a previous ruling immigrants had been denied access to particular occupations, which he viewed as a far more foundational right comparatively. The other justices responded to this opinion by stating that in order for "strict scrutiny" utilized, a fundamental right does not have to be denied. Justice Rehnquist argued the New York law wasn't suspect. In order for this to be the case, the law must discriminate against a marginalized group that is "discrete and insular." Because an immigrant had the ability to change that status through the legalization process, this could not be considered unjust.
