= Abortion in Montana =

2024 Montana Initiative 128 results map by county

Abortion in Montana is legal until fetal viability (or until full term, if a medical professional deems it important to protect life or health). The number of abortion clinics in Montana has fluctuated over the years, with twenty in 1982, twelve in 1992, eight providers of which seven were clinics in 2011, and five clinics in 2014. There were four clinics from 2015 to February 2018 when All Families Healthcare clinic in Whitefish reopened. There were 1,690 legal abortions in 2014, and 1,611 in 2015.

2024 Montana Initiative 128 is a ballot initiative that was approved from the ballot on November 5, 2024; amending the Constitution of Montana to explicitly confer a right to abortion up to fetal viability.

== History ==
=== Legislative history ===
In 1997, the Montana Legislature passed a law that said only physicians could perform abortions. After a lawsuit, they changed the law to allow nurse practitioners to perform abortions.

As of 2017, California, Oregon, Montana, Vermont, and New Hampshire allow qualified non-physician health professionals, such as physicians' assistants, nurse practitioners, and certified nurse midwives, to do first-trimester aspiration abortions and to prescribe drugs for medical abortions. As of May 1, 2018, there were no major legal restrictions on abortions.

As of May 14, 2019, the Montana Legislature prohibited abortions after the fetus was viable, generally some point between week 24 and 28. This period uses a standard defined by the Supreme Court of the United States in 1973 with the Roe v. Wade ruling. In 2018, advanced practice clinicians were legally allowed to provide abortion services. This group included physician assistants, certified nurse midwives, and advanced practice nurses.

In November 2022, Montana voters rejected a measure that would have given embryos and fetuses legal personhood status.

=== Judicial history ===
The Supreme Court of the United States' decision in 1973's Roe v. Wade ruling meant the state could no longer regulate abortion in the first trimester. However, the Supreme Court overturned Roe v. Wade in Dobbs v. Jackson Women's Health Organization, No. 19-1392, 597 U.S. ___ (2022) later in 2022.

In 1997, All Families Healthcare took the state to court to challenge its law stating that only physicians could perform abortions. In April 2018, two nurses succeeded in getting an injunction as part of a lawsuit against the state to try to allow advanced practice nurses to perform abortions. Montana's Attorney General Tim Fox appealed the injunction.

A 2024 Montana Supreme Court decision established that minors do not need parental consent to have an abortion, overruling a state law.

In 2025, the Montana Supreme Court struck down several laws restricting abortion access as unconstitutional, including a 20-week ban, a telehealth abortion prescription ban, a 24-hour waiting period and an ultrasound requirement.

=== Clinic history ===
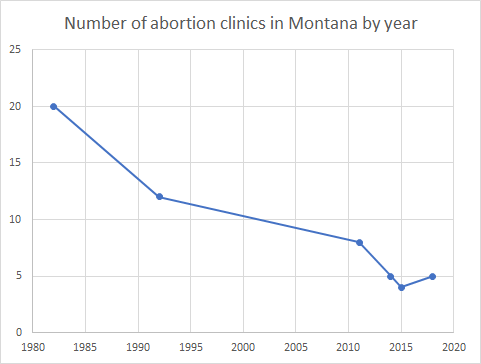
Number of abortion clinics in Montana by year

Between 1982 and 1992, the number of abortion clinics in the state decreased by eight, going from twenty in 1982 to twelve in 1992. All Families Healthcare opened in 1994.

On March 29, 1993, at the Blue Mountain Clinic in Missoula, Montana, at around 1 a.m., an arsonist snuck onto the premises and firebombed the clinic. The perpetrator, a Washington man, was ultimately caught, convicted and imprisoned. The facility was a near-total loss, but all of the patients' records, though damaged, survived the fire in metal file cabinets.

In 2011, there were eight abortion providers in the state, of which seven were classified as abortion clinics. In 2014, there were five abortion clinics in the state. 93% of the counties in the state did not have an abortion clinic. That year, 55% of women in the state aged 15–44 lived in a county without an abortion clinic. In March 2016, there were five Planned Parenthood clinics in the state.

In 2017, there were five Planned Parenthood clinics in a state with a population of 215,806 women aged 15–49 of which four offered abortion services. In 2018, the closest abortion clinics to Flathead Valley were in Missoula, Great Falls, Helena or Billings. These were all over 100 miles away, requiring women to travel great distances to have an abortion. All Families Healthcare clinic in Whitefish closed for four years in early 2015, before reopening in February 2018.

== Statistics ==
In the period between 1972 and 1974, there were zero recorded illegal abortion death in the state. In 1990, 84,000 women in the state faced the risk of an unintended pregnancy. Between 2011 and 2014, the abortion rate in Montana declined 26%. In 2013, among white women aged 15–19, there were 180 abortions, 0 abortions for black women aged 15–19, 10 abortions for Hispanic women aged 15–19, and 0 abortions for women of all other races. In 2014, 56% of Montana adults said in a poll by the Pew Research Center that abortion should be legal while 38% believed it should be illegal in all or most cases. The 2023 American Values Atlas reported that, in their most recent survey, 57% of Montanans said that abortion should be legal in all or most cases. In 2017, the state had an infant mortality rate of 5.4 deaths per 1,000 live births.

Number of reported abortions, abortion rate and percentage change in rate by geographic region and state in 1992, 1995 and 1996
Census division and state	Number			Rate			% change 1992–1996
Census division and state	1992	1995	1996	1992	1995	1996	% change 1992–1996
US Total	1,528,930	1,363,690	1,365,730	25.9	22.9	22.9	–12
Mountain	69,600	63,390	67,020	21	17.9	18.6	–12
Arizona	20,600	18,120	19,310	24.1	19.1	19.8	–18
Colorado	19,880	15,690	18,310	23.6	18	20.9	–12
Idaho	1,710	1,500	1,600	7.2	5.8	6.1	–15
Montana	3,300	3,010	2,900	18.2	16.2	15.6	–14
Nevada	13,300	15,600	15,450	44.2	46.7	44.6	1
New Mexico	6,410	5,450	5,470	17.7	14.4	14.4	–19
Utah	3,940	3,740	3,700	9.3	8.1	7.8	–16
Wyoming	460	280	280	4.3	2.7	2.7	–37

Number, rate, and ratio of reported abortions, by reporting area of residence and occurrence and by percentage of abortions obtained by out-of-state residents, US CDC estimates
Location	Residence			Occurrence			% obtained by out-of-state residents	Year	Ref
Location	No.	Rate^	Ratio^^	No.	Rate^	Ratio^^	% obtained by out-of-state residents	Year	Ref
Montana	1,504	8.1	121	1,690	9.1	136	13.4	2014	
Montana	1,433	7.7	114	1,611	8.6	128	13.3	2015	
Montana	1,503	8.0	122	1,618	8.6	132	9.8	2016	
^number of abortions per 1,000 women aged 15–44; ^^number of abortions per 1,000 live births

== Abortion financing ==
Seventeen states including Montana use their own funds to cover all or most "medically necessary" abortions sought by low-income women under Medicaid, thirteen of which are required by State court orders to do so. In 2010, the state had 422 publicly funded abortions, of which were 5 federally funded and 417 were state funded.

In 2018, women in Flathead Valley were waiting for insurance companies to pay for IUDs or implants. While waiting for the company to pay, they got pregnant and ended up getting an abortion.

== Abortion rights views and activities ==
=== Clinic protection ===
Around 100 volunteers support All Families Healthcare. This included driving women long distances for appointments, escorting patients inside and shoveling the sidewalk outside the clinic.

=== Protests ===
Women from the state participated in marches supporting abortion rights as part of a #StoptheBans movement in May 2019.

Following the overturn of Roe v. Wade on June 24, 2022, several abortion rights protests and marches were held across the state in late June and early July, including in the state capital of Helena where more than a thousand protestors gathered. Other protests were held in Bozeman, Missoula, Billings, and Great Falls.

On June 21, 2024, Montanans Securing Reproductive Rights announced that they had turned in over 117,000 signatures from all 56 counties for their petition to put a state constitutional amendment protecting abortion rights on the November 2024 ballot, almost double the 60,000 signatures required and the most signatures for a single ballot initiative in Montana history.

On October 12, 2024, an abortion rights protest supporting 2024 Montana Initiative 128 was held in Helena, Montana at the Montana State Capitol.

== Anti-abortion views and activities ==
=== Activities ===
In 2018, anti-abortion rights activists regularly protested outside All Families Healthcare.

=== Violence ===
On March 29, 1993, at Blue Mountain Clinic in Missoula, Montana; at around 1 a.m., an arsonist snuck onto the premises and firebombed the clinic. The perpetrator, a Washington man, was ultimately caught, convicted and imprisoned. The facility was a near-total loss, but all of the patients' records, though damaged, survived the fire in metal file cabinets.

On March 4, 2014, 24-year-old Zachary Klundt broke into All Families Healthcare in Kalispell, Montana and destroyed everything inside the clinic. He was arrested and charged with six felony charges, including three counts of theft, one of burglary, one of attempted burglary, and one of criminal mischief. He was sentenced to 20 years in prison and ordered to pay over $600,000 in restitution.

On October 5, 2023, an unknown individual fired two shotgun rounds into the front entrance of a Planned Parenthood clinic in Helena, Montana. In 2026, the individual was identified as 20-year old Charles Felix Jones, who had committed the crime when he was 17 years old and later confessed to it.

On March 8, 2026, Charles Felix Jones, 20, turned himself in to the police after trespassing into a Montana doctor's backyard and throwing items at his back window before leaving, having originally intended to murder the doctor and his wife before changing his mind. He also confessed to the 2023 shooting at a Planned Parenthood clinic in Helena. He was charged with two counts of assault with a weapon, intimidation and criminal trespass.
