= Abortion in Arkansas =

Abortion in Arkansas is illegal except when it is "necessary" to save the life of the pregnant individual. Due to imprecision in Arkansas law about what counts as "necessary" to save a patient's life, hospitals may refuse to perform abortions even to prevent major medical emergencies to the patient. Doctors determined to have performed an abortion face up to 10 years in prison and fines up to $100,000.

== History ==
=== Legislative history ===
Status of the "heartbeat bills", i.e. abortion bans at around 6 weeks, by state (exceptions not marked): Heartbeat bills supplemented or rendered moot by abortion bans at all stages Abortion bans at all stages, but heartbeat bills blocked Other states with abortion bans at all stages, or states without abortion providers Heartbeat bill in force, without total abortion bans Heartbeat law partially passed by state legislature Law passed but blocked or struck down by court order

By the end of the 1800s, all states in the Union except Louisiana had therapeutic exceptions in their legislative bans on abortions. In the late 1960s and early 1970s, Arkansas, Colorado, Georgia, Maryland, New Mexico, North Carolina and Oregon made reforms to their abortion laws, with most of these states providing more detailed medical guidance on when therapeutic abortions could be performed. An amendment to the state constitution in 1988 said, "The policy of Arkansas is to protect the life of every unborn child from conception until birth, to the extent permitted by the Federal Constitution.

The state was one of twenty-three states in 2007 to have a detailed abortion-specific informed consent requirement. Georgia, Michigan, Arkansas and Idaho all required in 2007 that women must be provided by an abortion clinic with the option to view an image of their fetus if an ultrasound is used prior to the abortion taking place. Arkansas, Minnesota and Oklahoma all require that women seeking abortions after 20-weeks be verbally informed that the fetus may feel pain during the abortion procedure despite a Journal of the American Medical Association conclusion that pain sensors do not develop in the fetus until between weeks 23 and 30. Informed consent materials about fetal pain at 20-weeks in Arkansas, Georgia and Oklahoma says, "the unborn child has the physical structures necessary to experience pain." The Journal of the American Medical Association has concluded that pain sensors do not develop in the fetus until between weeks 23 and 30. In 2013, state Targeted Regulation of Abortion Providers (TRAP) law applied to medication induced abortions and private doctor offices.

A bill banning abortion after twelve weeks was passed on January 31, 2013, by the Arkansas Senate, but vetoed in Arkansas by Governor Mike Beebe, but, on March 6, 2013, his veto was overridden by the Arkansas House of Representatives. A federal judge issued a temporary injunction against the Arkansas law in May 2013, and in March 2014, it was struck down by federal judge Susan Webber Wright, who described the law as unconstitutional.

The Trigger Law SB149 was filed in the Arkansas Senate on January 22, 2019, by Jason Rapert and Mary Bentley. It became law on February 20, 2019. It bans all abortions, with the only exception being for the life of the pregnant individual. Performing an abortion is an unclassified felony with a fine of up to $100,000 or 10 years imprisonment.

=== Judicial history ===
The US Supreme Court's decision in 1973's Roe v. Wade ruling meant the state could no longer regulate abortion in the first trimester.

In May 2013, a federal judge blocked the implementation of the legislation passed in March 2013. On May 27, 2015, the Eighth Circuit Court of Appeals affirmed a lower court ruling and permanently blocked the law from being enforced. In January 2016, the U.S. Supreme Court declined to review the case, leaving the Eighth Circuit's ruling in place.

On June 24, 2022, the United States Supreme Court overruled Roe v. Wade in the case of Dobbs v. Jackson Women's Health Organization. This triggered SB149's abortion ban.

In 2026, six women and an obstetrician-gynecologist sued the state of Arkansas, seeking to declare Arkansas' abortion ban unconstitutional and block its enforcement. Four of the women had nonviable pregnancies and were denied care in Arkansas, forcing them to leave the state for abortions.

=== Clinic history ===
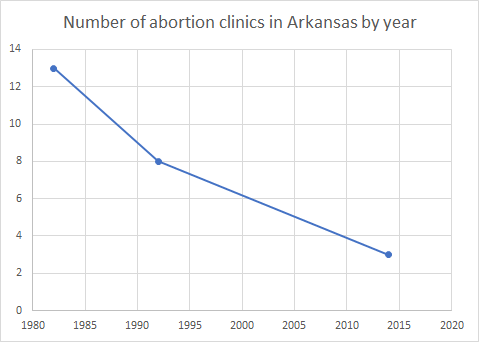
Number of abortion clinics in Arkansas by year

Between 1982 and 1992, the number of abortion clinics in the state decreased by five, going from thirteen in 1982 to eight in 1992. In 2014, there were three abortion clinics in the state. In 2014, 97% of the counties in the state did not have an abortion clinic. That year, 77% of women in the state aged 15–44 lived in a county without an abortion clinic. As of 2019, the state had one Planned Parenthood clinic, which offered abortion services.

As of 2022, there are no abortion providers offering services in Arkansas as a result of SB149.

== Statistics ==
In the period between 1972 and 1974, there were zero recorded illegal abortion deaths in the state. In 1990, 241,000 women in the state faced the risk of an unintended pregnancy. In 2010, the state had no publicly funded abortions. In 2013, among white women aged 15–19, there were 270 abortions, 240 abortions for black women aged 15–19, 40 abortions for Hispanic women aged 15–19, and 10 abortions for women of all other races. In 2014, 38% of adults said in a poll by the Pew Research Center that abortion should be legal in all or most cases. In 2017, the state had an infant mortality rate of 8.2 deaths per 1,000 live births.

Number of reported abortions, abortion rate and percentage change in rate by geographic region and state in 1992, 1995 and 1996
Census division and state	Number			Rate			% change 1992–1996
Census division and state	1992	1995	1996	1992	1995	1996	% change 1992–1996
US Total	1,528,930	1,363,690	1,365,730	25.9	22.9	22.9	–12
West South Central	127,070	119,200	120,610	19.6	18	18.1	–8
Arkansas	7,130	6,010	6,200	13.5	11.1	11.4	–15
Louisiana	13,600	14,820	14,740	13.4	14.7	14.7	10
Oklahoma	8,940	9,130	8,400	12.5	12.9	11.8	–5
Texas	97,400	89,240	91,270	23.1	20.5	20.7	–10

Number, rate, and ratio of reported abortions, by reporting area of residence and occurrence and by percentage of abortions obtained by out-of-state residents, US CDC estimates
Location	Residence			Occurrence			% obtained by out-of-state residents	Year	Ref
Location	No.	Rate^	Ratio^^	No.	Rate^	Ratio^^	% obtained by out-of-state residents	Year	Ref
Arkansas				7,130	13.5			1992	
Arkansas				6,010	11.1			1995	
Arkansas				6,200	11.4			1996	
Arkansas	4,024	7.0	104	4,253	7.4	110	22.2	2014	
Arkansas	3,805	6.6	98	3,771	6.5	97	18.6	2015	
Arkansas	3,432	6.0	90	3,207	5.6	84	16.5	2016	
^number of abortions per 1,000 women aged 15–44; ^^number of abortions per 1,000 live births

== Abortion rights views and activities ==
=== Protests ===
Women from the state participated in marches supporting abortion rights as part of a #StoptheBans movement in May 2019.

Following the Roe v. Wade overturn draft leak on May 2, 2022, an abortion rights protest was held in Fayetteville, Arkansas.

Following the overturn of Roe v. Wade on June 24, 2022, around 200 abortion rights protesters gathered outside the Arkansas State Capitol in Little Rock.

In Little Rock, Arkansas on March 10, 2024, several hundred abortion rights protesters rallied at the state capitol building in support of the petition for an Arkansas abortion amendment to end the abortion ban in the state.

On July 5, 2024, Arkansans For Limited Government announced that they submitted over 100,000 signatures from all 75 counties to the Secretary of State's office for a proposed abortion rights amendment to be placed on the ballot in the November 2024 election. The amendment would legalize abortion up to 18 weeks and protect abortion access after that point for cases of rape, incest, fatal fetal abnormalities and to protect the pregnant individual's life or health. However, the ballot proposal lacked support from national abortion rights groups such as Planned Parenthood due to the fact that it still would have allowed abortions in the Arkansas to be banned after 20 weeks, which is earlier than other states where it remains legal. On August 22, 2024, the Arkansas Supreme Court removed the measure from the November 2024 ballot in a 4-3 ruling, determining that the Arkansas Secretary of State's decision not to count signatures was legal due to Arkansans for Limited Government failing to comply with state law by failing to file the paid canvasser training certification. The problem resulted from documentation regarding paid signature gatherers being submitted separately rather than in a single bundle.

== Anti-abortion views and activities ==
In June 2024, several canvassers for the Arkansas abortion rights amendment reported that they had been stalked, followed, threatened, harassed, doxxed and filmed by anti-abortion protesters.
