= Beal v. Doe =

- Supreme Court of the United States

Argued January 11, 1977 Decided June 20, 1977
- Full case name: Beal, Secretary, Department of Public Welfare of Pennsylvania, et al. v. Doe et al.
- Citations: 432 U.S. 438 (more) 97 S. Ct. 2366; 53 L. Ed. 2d 464

Holding
- The constitutionally protected right of abortion does not mean that states have to treat potential motherhood and abortion in the same manner.

Court membership
- Chief Justice Warren E. Burger Associate Justices William J. Brennan Jr. · Potter Stewart; Byron White · Thurgood Marshall; Harry Blackmun · Lewis F. Powell Jr. William Rehnquist · John P. Stevens

Case opinions
- Majority: Powell, joined by Burger, Stewart, White, Rehnquist, Stevens
- Dissent: Brennan, joined by Marshall, Blackmun
- Dissent: Marshall
- Dissent: Blackmun, joined by Brennan, Marshall

Beal v. Doe, 432 U.S. 438 (1977), was a United States Supreme Court case that concerned the disbursement of federal funds in Pennsylvania. Pennsylvania statute restricted federal funding to abortion clinics. The Supreme Court ruled states are not required to treat abortion in the same manner as potential motherhood. The opinion of the Court left the central holding of the Roe v. Wade decision – abortion as a right – intact. The statute was upheld, with Justice Powell writing the majority opinion.

== Background ==
After the Supreme Court's decision in Roe v. Wade those still opposed to abortion in the United States "turned to local legislators in an effort to curb the practice of abortion." This particular abortion case that came before the Supreme Court involved a Pennsylvania law that restricted "Medicaid-funded abortions" only to "indigent women" when deemed medically necessary.

== Decision of the Supreme Court ==
In a 6–3 decision, Justice Powell wrote the decision for the majority. Justices Burger, Stewart, White, Rehnquist and Stevens joined Powell's opinion. The opinion did not disregard Roe; instead, Beal reaffirmed abortion as a right. The majority opinion asserts the constitutionally protected right of abortion does not mean that states have to treat potential motherhood and abortion in the same manner. Furthermore, the opinion allowed restriction of federal funding in the first trimester of abortion. Powell continued by stating the law does not create poverty that hinders poor women from seeking abortion. In addition, Powell defends states' preference on birth over abortion by claiming Roe does not bar preference.

== See also ==
- List of United States Supreme Court cases, volume 432
