= Gerardo Flores (murderer) =

American murderer

Gerardo Flores (born 1986) of Lufkin, Texas, was convicted in 2005 of two counts of capital murder under the 2003 Texas fetal homicide law for giving his girlfriend, who was carrying twins, an at-home abortion the previous year. Prosecutors chose not to seek the death penalty, and so he was sentenced automatically to life in prison without the possibility of parole for 40 years.

His girlfriend, Erica Basoria, was sixteen years old and five months pregnant at the time. According to the facts as stated in Flores v. State her doctor told her that it was too late to have an abortion. Basoria testified at the trial that she asked Flores to step on her abdomen. According to the Court record she attempted to induce miscarriage herself: "by the last week of her pregnancy she was striking herself everyday".

Flores said he initially refused but she would not relent until he agreed. Flores admitted to police that he "Accidentally, probably" hit Basoria in the face during a fight on the night of the miscarriage. Basoria told police that he was not abusive.

During the trial prosecutors noted that Basoria's swollen lip and bruises on her face were consistent with an assault. They said she was lying to protect Flores.

Texas' fetal homicide law did not allow charges against the mother because she had a right to terminate pregnancy, so only Flores was charged. Flores challenged the constitutionality of the fetal protection law on appeal. His appeal was rejected.
