= Abortion in Kentucky =

Abortion is illegal in Kentucky, except to save a pregnant woman's life or to prevent disabling injury.

There were laws in Kentucky about abortion by 1900, including ones with therapeutic exceptions. In 1998, the state passed legislation that required clinics to have an abortion clinic license if they wanted to operate. By the early 2010s, members of the Kentucky Legislature attempted to ban abortion in almost all cases and had also introduced the early abortion bans. Prior to 2019, Kentucky law prohibited abortions after week 22. This changed when the Republican-controlled state legislature passed a law that moved the prohibition to week 6 in the early part of the year. A bill passed and made effective in April 2022 lowered the threshold to 15 weeks, the second most restrictive limit in effect in the United States behind Texas, and introduced regulations that made abortion illegal until it was blocked in federal court.

Effective upon Dobbs v. Jackson Women's Health Organization overruling of Roe v. Wade, Kentucky's trigger law, HB 148, went into effect, prohibiting abortion except as necessary to prevent possible death or risk of permanent injury to the pregnant woman. On June 30, 2022, Jefferson County Circuit Judge Mitch Perry issued a temporary restraining order blocking enforcement of the state's abortion ban pending further hearings to determine if the ban violates the Kentucky Constitution. This order temporarily allowed both of Kentucky's elective abortion providers, which are both located in Louisville, to temporarily resume elective abortions. Kentucky's trigger law banning abortions was reinstated on August 1, 2022.

The number of abortion clinics has declined over time, with eleven abortion clinics in 1982, nine in 1992, two in 2002, and one in 2017. There were 4,923 legal abortions in 2014, and 4,585 in 2015.

== History ==
=== Legislative history ===
Status of the "heartbeat bills", i.e. abortion bans at around 6 weeks, by state (exceptions not marked): Heartbeat bills supplemented or rendered moot by abortion bans at all stages Abortion bans at all stages, but heartbeat bills blocked Other states with abortion bans at all stages, or states without abortion providers Heartbeat bill in force, without total abortion bans Heartbeat law partially passed by state legislature Law passed but blocked or struck down by court order

By the end of the 1800s, all states in the Union except Louisiana had therapeutic exceptions in their legislative bans on abortions. In the 19th century, bans by state legislatures on abortion were about protecting the life of the mother given the number of deaths caused by abortions; state governments saw themselves as looking out for the lives of their citizens.

In 1974, Kentucky adopted a law preventing public hospitals from performing abortion procedures except to protect the life of the mother. The law was later ruled unconstitutional by the Sixth Circuit Court of Appeals, but the state legislature passed a new version of the law in 1980. That law was challenged by the American Civil Liberties Union (ACLU) in 1987 after Kentucky Right to Life alleged that Owensboro-Daviess County Hospital had performed an abortion on the previous year in violation of the law. The office of state Attorney General David L. Armstrong issued a non-binding opinion that the law was unconstitutional. The ACLU dropped the case in 1989 after the U.S. Supreme Court upheld a similar law in Missouri in the case of Webster v. Reproductive Health Services.

The 1981 unlawful abortion conviction of a Wayne County, Kentucky man put the issue of abortion before the Kentucky Supreme Court. In 1983, the court ruled that the seven-month-old fetus killed by the man during an attack on his wife could not be defined as a person under the Model Penal Code. In response to the court's ruling, Democratic State Representative Carl Nett introduced a fetal homicide bill in the 1986 General Assembly; the bill passed the House but was not considered in the Senate.

During the 1982 Kentucky General Assembly, Democrat William I. Donnermeyer Sr. introduced a bill placing several restrictions and conditions on abortion; to wit: parental consent was required before an abortion could be performed on a minor, husbands must be informed if their wives underwent an abortion, a woman seeking an abortion must wait 24 hours before having the procedure and must be provided with information on fetal development and abortion alternatives, and doctors must document the reasons giving for a woman seeking an abortion. Despite an opinion issued by then-Attorney General Steve Beshear holding that the law was not constitutional, it was enacted by the legislature. The ACLU filed suit against the law in June 1982, preventing it from becoming effective on July 15 of that year. In September 1984, U.S. District Judge Charles M. Allen struck down most of the law's provisions. The 1986 General Assembly passed legislation again requiring parental consent for minors seeking abortions. The law required the consent of only the custodial parent if the parents did not live together, and also allowed the minor to petition a district or circuit court for permission. Judge Allen upheld this law in a 1988 ruling.

In 1998, the General Assembly passed legislation that required clinics to have an Abortion Clinic License if they wanted to operate. Part of this was a requirement for a transfer agreement between the clinic and a hospital and ambulance. Kentucky was one of 23 states in 2007 to have a detailed abortion-specific informed consent requirement.

The Kentucky General Assembly was one of four states that tried and failed, to pass an early abortion ban bill in 2012 and again in 2014 when they were one of five states making the attempt. In 2013, state Targeted Regulation of Abortion Providers (TRAP) law applied to medication-induced abortions in addition to abortion clinics. Republican State Representative Joseph Fischer introduced the same bill with the same bill number (H.B. 132) on January 11, 2013. The bill was referred to the House Health and Welfare Committee on February 20, 2013; it did not advance out of the committee. They tried to ban abortion that year, one of five states to do so. Only North Dakota successfully passed such a law but it was later struck down by the courts. Previous early abortion ban bills filed in Kentucky have failed to pass. An early abortion ban bill, HB 132, was introduced on January 7, 2014, by Representative Fischer. The bill was referred to the House Health and Welfare Committee on March 19, 2014; it did not advance out of the committee. The Lexington Herald-Leader described the situation in 2014: "Every year, anti-abortion bills sail out of the Republican-led Senate with huge majorities, only to get stuck in the House Health and Welfare Committee alongside anti-abortion bills filed in the House. Chairman Tom Burch, D-Louisville, is in favor of abortion rights, as is more than half of his committee. Burch keeps anti-abortion bills off the House floor, shielding the Democratic majority from votes that many prefer to avoid."

They were one of six states to try again to ban abortion in 2017 and were one of eleven states again in 2018.

Prior to 2019, Kentucky law prohibited abortions after week 22. This changed when the state legislature passed a law that moved the prohibition to week 6 in the early part of the year. Two bills which seek to prohibit abortions after fetal cardiac activity is detected were filed in the Kentucky General Assembly in 2019. State Senator Matt Castlen introduced SB 9 on January 8, 2019. On February 14, 2019, SB 9 passed out of the Kentucky Senate by a 31–6 vote. The bill was received in the House on February 15, 2019. Damon Thayer, the Senate Republican floor leader said SB 9 "absolutely" was a priority for the chamber. He said he would be delighted if it became law and ended up before the U.S. Supreme Court as a means to overturn to Roe v. Wade. "It would be the pinnacle of my career," he said. On March 14, 2019, the Kentucky House passed SB 9 by a vote of 71–19. The next day the state's chapter of the ACLU filed a petition for a temporary restraining order preventing implementation of the ban. In EMW Women's Surgical Center v. Meier, the 6-week ban was stayed by the US District Judge David Hale.

A similar bill by State Representative Robert Goforth was introduced in the Kentucky House of Representatives. The bill, HB 100, which was pre-filed on December 13, 2018, was referred to the Health and Family Services Committee on January 10, 2019. When asked about the bill, Goforth, who announced his candidacy for Governor of Kentucky on January 8, 2019, the same day the bill was introduced, said he would be pleased if Kentucky or one of the other states considering similar measures enacted such a law and, in the event of the court challenge, took the case to the U.S. Supreme Court in an effort to overturn Roe v. Wade.

On April 14, 2022, House Bill 3 was passed by the predominately Republican legislature, overturning a veto by Democratic Governor Andy Beshear, and made effective immediately under an emergency clause. Modeled after a similar ban in Mississippi, the bill banned all abortions in the state after 15 weeks post-conception and introduced a number of regulations and restrictions, including a prohibition on mailing abortion pills, new systems to certify, monitor and publicly name physicians who conduct abortion procedures, "dignified care for the terminated remains of pregnancy loss," and mandatory disclosure of patient information. As the infrastructure was not in place for these new requirements, the two abortion clinics operating in Kentucky had to shut down, making abortion de facto illegal in the state. In response, abortion-rights activists sued the state to challenge the law, with Planned Parenthood and the ACLU stating that the law unconstitutionally bans abortion by introducing requirements that can't be followed or are too arduous to comply with and that it violates patient privacy protections; this led to the law being blocked in federal court later in 2022.

On June 24, 2022, the 2019 trigger law took effect after the ruling for Dobbs v. Jackson Women's Health Organization was delivered, which overturned Roe v. Wade. It made all abortions illegal except when medically mandatory to prevent the patient from dying or getting a "life-sustaining organ" permanently impaired. Both clinics in the state temporarily stopped providing abortions. On June 30, 2022, Jefferson County Circuit Judge Mitch Perry issued a temporary restraining order blocking enforcement of Kentucky's trigger law pending further hearings to determine if the ban violates the Kentucky Constitution. This order temporarily allowed both of Kentucky's elective abortion providers, which are both located in Louisville, to temporarily resume elective abortions.

In November 2022, voters defeated a ballot question that would have amended the state constitution to clarify that the constitution does not protect abortion rights.

=== Judicial history ===
The U.S. Supreme Court's decision in 1973's Roe v. Wade ruling meant the state could no longer regulate abortion in the first trimester. EMW Women's Surgical Center took the state of Kentucky to court in 1998 over the need to have a license to run an abortion clinic. They lost their case in court. In 2019, the courts issued an injunction to stop the recently passed 6-week abortion ban from coming into effect. Similarly, a federal court temporary blocked House Bill 3 a week after it was passed following suits from pro-abortion advocates. The Supreme Court overturned Roe v. Wade in Dobbs v. Jackson Women's Health Organization, No. 19-1392, 597 U.S. ___ (2022) later in 2022. On June 30, 2022, Jefferson County Circuit Judge Mitch Perry issued a temporary restraining order blocking enforcement of the state's abortion ban pending further hearings to determine if the ban violates the Kentucky Constitution. This order temporarily allowed both of Kentucky's elective abortion providers, which are both located in Louisville, to temporarily resume elective abortions. Both the Kentucky Court of Appeals and the Kentucky Supreme Court refused a request to dissolve the restraining order until August 1, 2022.

On February 16, 2023, the Kentucky Supreme Court ruled that abortion providers lacked standing to challenge the state's abortion ban, but did not elaborate on whether or not the Kentucky Constitution secured abortion rights.

In December 2023, the ACLU filed a class action lawsuit challenging the state's near total abortion ban on behalf of a Kentucky woman. The suit stated that Kentucky's near-total abortion ban violated the plaintiff's right to privacy and self-determination under the state constitution.

=== Clinic history ===
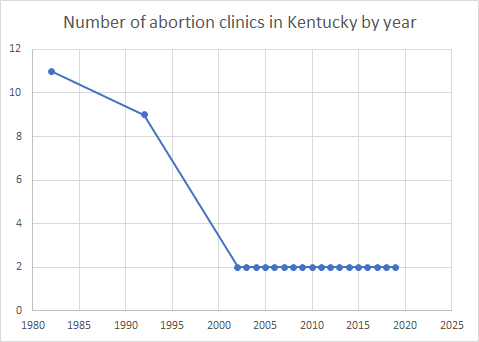
Number of abortion clinics in Kentucky by year

There were three or four abortion service providers in Louisville in 1981. That year, EMW Women's Surgical Center opened in the city. In 1989, EMW Women's Surgical Center opened a satellite clinic in Lexington. Both clinics were run by Dr. Sam Eubanks and Dr. Ernest Marshall. Eubanks died in 2013. Between 1982 and 1992, the number of abortion clinics in the state decreased by two, going from eleven in 1982 to nine in 1992.

Since around 2002, the two EMW Women's Surgical Centers were the only abortion providers in the state. Other ones that had existed in the state had voluntarily closed. In 2014, there were two abortion clinics in the state. In 2014, 98% of the 120 counties in the state did not have an abortion clinic. That year, 74% of women in the state aged 15–44 lived in a county without an abortion clinic.

In 2017, there were two Planned Parenthood clinics, neither of which offered abortion services, in Kentucky whose population of women aged 15–49 at the time was 996,488. As of July 21, 2017, Kentucky, Louisiana, Mississippi, North Dakota, West Virginia, and Wyoming were the only six states that did not have a Planned Parenthood clinic offering abortion services. In early 2017, EMW Women's Surgical Center in Louisville was the only facility in the state of Kentucky that provided women with abortion services. Another clinic in Lexington run by the same organization had closed in January that year because it could not meet new licensing requirements. Kentucky Governor Matt Bevin worked to try to close EMW Women's Surgical Center in Louisville. In May 2019, the state was officially one of six in the nation with only one abortion clinic. Planned Parenthood Louisville started providing abortion services in 2020, leading to the state having two providers, both in Louisville, that performed abortions until the near-total ban in 2022.

In 2022, EMW Women's Surgical Center closed after the decision in Dobbs v. Jackson Women's Health Organization. The site was sold, and the building was demolished to make way for a hotel. The state now has no abortion clinics.

== Statistics ==
In the period between 1972 and 1974, the state had an illegal abortion mortality rate per million women aged 15–44 of between 0.1 and 0.9. In 1990, 401,000 women in the state faced the risk of unintended pregnancy. In 2010, the state had zero publicly funded abortions. In 2013, among white women aged 15–19, there were 450 abortions, 170 abortions for black women aged 15–19, 30 abortions for Hispanic women aged 15–19, and 20 abortions for women of all other races. In 2014, 36% of adults said in a poll by the Pew Research Center that abortion should be legal in all or most cases. 57% of people in Kentucky said abortion should be "illegal in all or most cases". According to a 2014 Public Religion Research Institute (PRRI) study, 60% of white women in the state believed that abortion be illegal in all or most cases. In 2017, the state had an infant mortality rate of 6.5 deaths per 1,000 live births.

Number of reported abortions, abortion rate, and percentage change in rate by geographic region and state in 1992, 1995, and 1996
Census division and state	Number			Rate			% change 1992–1996
Census division and state	1992	1995	1996	1992	1995	1996	% change 1992–1996
Total	1,528,930	1,363,690	1,365,730	25.9	22.9	22.9	–12
East South Central	54,060	44,010	46,100	14.9	12	12.5	–17
Alabama	17,450	14,580	15,150	18.2	15	15.6	–15
Kentucky	10,000	7,770	8,470	11.4	8.8	9.6	–16
Mississippi	7,550	3,420	4,490	12.4	5.5	7.2	–42
Tennessee	19,060	18,240	17,990	16.2	15.2	14.8	–8

Number, rate, and ratio of reported abortions, by reporting area of residence and occurrence and by percentage of abortions obtained by out-of-state residents, US CDC estimates
Location	Residence			Occurrence			% obtained by out-of-state residents	Year	Ref
Location	No.	Rate^	Ratio^^	No.	Rate^	Ratio^^	% obtained by out-of-state residents	Year	Ref
Kentucky				10,000	11.4			1992	
Kentucky				7,770	8.8			1995	
Kentucky				8,470	9.6			1996	
Kentucky	4,923	5.8	88	3,442	4.0	61	11.3	2014	
Kentucky	4,585	5.4	82	3,188	3.7	57	12.8	2015	
Kentucky	4,586	5.4	83	3,312	3.9	60	14.0	2016	
^number of abortions per 1,000 women aged 15–44; ^^number of abortions per 1,000 live births

== Anti-abortion activism ==
Since 2005, an annual event called Cross the Bridge For Life has occurred in support of the pro-life movement in Newport, Kentucky. The event entails crossing the Purple People Bridge between Newport, Kentucky, and Cincinnati, Ohio, by thousands of attendees.

== Abortion rights activism ==
Women from the state participated in marches supporting abortion rights as part of a #StoptheBans movement in May 2019.

Following the overturn of Roe v. Wade on June 24, 2022, abortion rights protests were held in Louisville, Lexington, Frankfort, Bowling Green and Covington.
