= Amanda Zurawski =

American reproductive rights activist (born 1987)

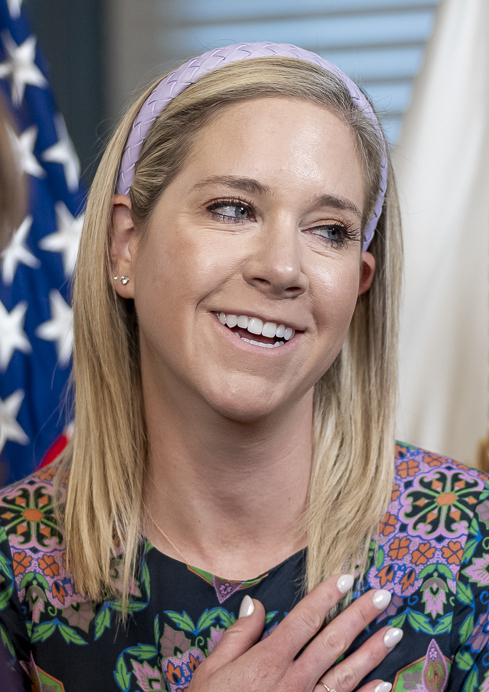
- Zurawski in 2024
- Born: 1987 (age 38–39)
- Occupation: high tech
- Known for: Zurawski v. State of Texas

Amanda Zurawski (born 1987) is an American reproductive rights activist known for her role in suing the state of Texas, in Zurawski v. State of Texas, after she suffered life-threatening risks during her pregnancy after being denied an abortion.

== Legal case ==
Amanda Zurawski was denied an abortion when she was 18 weeks pregnant because her fetus had a detectable heartbeat. She subsequently went into septic shock twice and was left with a permanently closed fallopian tube due to scar tissue. Subsequently, she filed a suit against the State of Texas, alongside four other women who joined the suit in March 2023. The New York Times reported that the case was the first time that a pregnant woman took legal action against an abortion ban since the Supreme Court overturned Roe v. Wade in 2022 in the decision of Dobbs v. Jackson Women's Health Organization.

== Advocacy work ==
On 26 April 2023, Zurawski appeared in a United States Senate Committee on the Judiciary hearing on the impact of the Supreme Court's reversal of Roe v. Wade. She addressed her senators Ted Cruz and John Cornyn, saying that her "horrific" experience was due to the policies they supported and that she "nearly died on their watch".

Zurawski campaigned heavily for President Biden's re-election and subsequently was a surrogate in the presidential campaign of Kamala Harris in 2024 as an outspoken supporter to "restoring and protecting reproductive rights in this country". She was featured in a campaign ad focused on abortion access that retold her story and near-death experience. In August 2024, Zurawski appeared along with her husband Josh as a speaker at the 2024 Democratic National Convention where she talked about abortion rights remaining a top-of-mind concern for her, along with access to contraception and IVF, which have been targeted by some sectors of the anti-abortion movement. In a statement with The 19th, Zurawski did not rule out running for public office in 2026.

On 4 December 2024, Zurawski appeared alongside Kerry Washington and Jennifer Lawrence, one of the producers of the documentary focused on Zurawski's case, at the Hollywood Reporter Women in Entertainment Gala to present $1 million in college scholarships for high school students from underserved communities in Los Angeles. Zurawski addressed the stage:

The power of your voice and your choices are never small. To the young women here today, especially those of you in the mentorship program: you have the potential to change everything. … You have the power to demand more — for your health, your education, your careers, your futures — and no one should ever take that power away from you.

== Documentary movie ==
In November 2024 a documentary movie about Zurawski and her case titled Zurawski v Texas was released in cinemas. The movie features Zurawski and others centered in the case, alongside lead attorney Molly Duane of the Center for Reproductive Rights and others and was co-directed by Maisie Crow and Abbie Perrault.

== Awards and recognition ==
In December 2024, Zurawski was named one of BBC's 100 Women of 2024.

She was named one of Time’s Women of the Year for 2025.

== Personal life ==
Zurawski grew up in Indiana, where she met her now-husband Josh Zurawski when they were young children at Aldersgate Academy preschool. They became a couple in high school. They now live in Austin, Texas, working in high tech.
