= OMHS =

OMHS may refer to:

- Oak Mountain High School, Birmingham, Alabama, United States
- Oakland Mills High School, Columbia, Maryland, United States
- Owensboro Medical Health System Hospital in Owensboro, Kentucky, United States
- Owings Mills High School, Owings Mills, Maryland, United States
- Old Mill High School, Millersville, Maryland, United States
