= Adkins v. State of Idaho =

Legal case concerning medical exceptions to Idaho's abortion ban

Adkins v. State of Idaho is a court case heard by the Idaho Fourth District Court regarding medical exceptions to the state's abortion ban, specifically relating to cases in which a pregnant person's life is at risk and when a fetus has a fatal diagnosis. The lawsuit was filed by the Center for Reproductive Rights on September 11, 2023, and proceedings began November 12, 2024.

== Background ==
On March 24, 2020, Governor Brad Little signed into law S1385, a trigger law stating that if and when states are again allowed to ban abortion on their own authority, performing an abortion would be a felony in Idaho except for cases of the life of the mother, rape, or incest; exceptions are not made for the health of the pregnant person nor of the fetus. After the Supreme Court of the United States overturned Roe v. Wade and Planned Parenthood v. Casey in its June 2022 decision in Dobbs v. Jackson Women's Health Organization, Idaho's trigger law banning abortion went into effect on August 25, 2022. On January 5, 2023, the Idaho Supreme Court ruled that the Idaho Constitution does not confer a right to an abortion, rejecting a challenge to the states' abortion laws by Planned Parenthood.

== Case history ==
The case's lead plaintiff is Jennifer Adkins, an Idaho woman who was denied an abortion when she was 12 weeks pregnant, at which point she learned the fetus was unlikely to survive due to multiple conditions, including Turner syndrome; she was also informed she would likely miscarry. If she did not miscarry, Adkins likely would have experienced life-threatening conditions, such as edema or pre-eclampsia. After receiving financial assistance, Adkins received an abortion in Oregon. Three other women joined the suit, all of whom were pregnant with their second child when they learned it had a life-threatening medical condition; all three women sought abortions out of state. In addition to patients impacted by Idaho's abortion ban, plaintiffs include two board-certified physicians, as well as the Idaho Academy of Family Physicians.

The lawsuit against the State of Idaho was filed by the Center for Reproductive Rights on September 11, 2023, though the State of Idaho initially attempted to dismiss the case, claiming it was based on "hypothetical medical situations". After Idaho’s Fourth District Court rejected the state's attempt, proceedings began November 12, 2024. The case aims to clarify the state's medical exceptions, including defining when a physician is able to perform lifesaving care, including cases in which the fetus has been diagnosed with a fatal condition. The state's attorney, James Craig, has argued that the state's legislation is clear.

Patient plaintiff's testimonies all began by sharing how excited they were to be pregnant, followed by their stories of learning about their fetuses' anomalies and the treks they made to receive medical abortions. The state's attorney made frequent objections during the patient plaintiff's testimonies, calling into question their relevance to the case; the court rejected the objections. Physician plaintiffs then testified regarding the lack of medical language included in the current legislation, which makes it difficult for physicians to know when they are able to perform medical abortions. Physician Emily Corrigan's testimony lasted eight hours as she explained her attempts to understand the line where abortions are and are not acceptable to save a patient's life.

Proceedings are expected to close November 21, 2024.

== See also ==
- Blackmon v. State of Tennessee
- Cox v. Texas
- Zurawski v. State of Texas
