= Trigger law =

Law that commences upon the satisfaction of certain requirements

A trigger law is a law that is unenforceable but may achieve enforceability if a key change in circumstances occurs.

== Examples ==
=== United States ===
==== Abortion ====
States with trigger laws or pre-Roe v. Wade bans on abortion that made abortion illegal in the state following the 2022 overturning of Roe v. Wade Trigger laws in place Trigger laws and pre-Roe laws in place Pre-Roe laws in place

In the United States, thirteen states, Arkansas, Idaho, Kentucky, Louisiana, Mississippi, Missouri, North Dakota, Oklahoma, South Dakota, Tennessee, Texas, Utah, and Wyoming, enacted trigger laws that would automatically ban abortion in the first and second trimesters if the landmark case Roe v. Wade were overturned. When Roe v. Wade was overturned on 24 June 2022, some of these laws were in effect, and presumably enforceable, immediately. Other states' trigger laws took effect 30 days after the overturn date, and others take effect upon certification by either the governor or attorney general. Illinois formerly had a trigger law (enacted in 1975) but repealed it in 2017.

Eight states, among them Alabama, Arizona, West Virginia, and Wisconsin, as well as the already mentioned Arkansas, Mississippi, Oklahoma, and Texas, still have their pre-Roe v. Wade abortion bans on the law books. In North Carolina, a prohibition on abortions after 20 weeks (excepting medical emergencies) was passed in 1973 but unenforceable due to Roe v. Wade and a court ruling that it was unconstitutional until it was reinstated by U.S. District Judge William Osteen Jr. in August 2022. According to a 2019 Contraception Journal study, the reversal of Roe v. Wade and implementation of trigger laws (as well as other states considered highly likely to ban abortion), "In the year following a reversal, increases in travel distance are estimated to prevent 93,546 to 143,561 women from accessing abortion".

==== Medicaid ====
The Affordable Care Act allowed states to opt in to a program of health care expansion, which allowed more residents to qualify for Medicaid. The cost of this expansion was primarily borne by the federal government, but the percent paid by the federal government was scheduled to decrease each year, reaching 95% by 2017 and below 90% by 2021; the remainder would be assumed by the state. As of 2017, eight states had laws that would trigger an end to participation in Medicaid expansion, if federal funding fell below a particular level. Unlike abortion trigger laws prior to the overturning of Roe v. Wade, these are not unconstitutional at the moment and are only inactive because they rely on certain conditions to activate.

==== Same-sex marriage ====
In the 2015 Supreme Court decision Obergefell v. Hodges, all state constitutional and statutory bans of same-sex marriage were made null and void. However, if the precedent was overturned it would restore the bans in thirty-five states. In his concurring opinion in Dobbs v. Jackson Women's Health Organization, Supreme Court Justice Clarence Thomas said the court should reconsider the Obergefell ruling. Nevada became the first state to repeal its amendment banning same-sex marriage and recognize it in the Nevada state constitution in 2020.

==== Gun control ====
In July 2023, the Indianapolis City-County Council passed an assault weapons ban trigger law, which can only go into effect once the Indiana gun control state preemption law is repealed or invalidated.

==== Rent control ====
Richmond, California has strict ordinances related to rent control that will take effect in the event that the statewide Costa–Hawkins Rental Housing Act is repealed.

==== Elections ====
The states of Iowa and New Hampshire have trigger laws mandating that the election administrators place the Iowa caucuses and the New Hampshire presidential primary ahead of any other state's nomination event for presidential candidates of major parties.

The National Popular Vote Interstate Compact uses a trigger portion in which the interstate compact comes into effect upon accession by enough states amounting to 270 electoral votes.

California passed Proposition 50 in 2025, which allows the California Legislature to pass a temporary congressional district map only in response to other states passing mid-decade maps of their own. The Virginia General Assembly placed similar legislation on the state ballot in 2026.

In 2024, North Dakota passed Initiated Measure 1, which mandates age limits on candidates running for election to either house of Congress from the state. The amendment remains unenforceable under U.S. Term Limits, Inc. v. Thornton (1995).

== See also ==
- Interstate compact
