= Abortion in Idaho =

Abortion in Idaho is illegal from fertilization. Following the overturning of Roe v. Wade on June 24, 2022, abortion in Idaho was criminalized by the trigger law which states that a person who performs an abortion may face two to five years of imprisonment. The ban allows exceptions for maternal health, rape and incest within the first trimester. The law took effect on August 25, 2022. Minors need parental consent to travel out of state for an abortion.

Some state leaders, including former Lt. Gov. Janice McGeachin "are calling for even stricter laws, including eliminating the exceptions for rape, incest and the life of the mother and pushing to classify abortion as felony murder."

Between 2022 and 2024, Idaho lost over one third of OB-GYNs due to Idaho's total abortion ban, with many leaving to practice in other states without abortion bans.

In 2026, Idaho voted on a referendum on abortion and related matters, which failed to pass.

== History ==
=== Legislative history ===
By 1950, the state legislature passed a law stating that a woman who had an abortion or actively sought to have an abortion regardless of whether she went through with it were guilty of a criminal offense.

The state passed a law in the 2000s banning abortions after 22 weeks because they alleged that fetus can feel pain. The state was one of 23 states in 2007 to have a detailed abortion-specific informed consent requirement. In the informed consent materials given to women in Idaho, Oklahoma, South Dakota and Texas required by statute, the materials used graphic and inflammatory language. Idaho was the only state of 23 with detailed informed consent requirements by statute that did not require the woman be told how far advanced her pregnancy was. Georgia, Michigan, Arkansas and Idaho all required in 2007 that women must be provided by an abortion clinic with the option to view an image of their fetus if an ultrasound is used prior to the abortion taking place. As of May 14, 2019, the state prohibited abortions after the fetus was viable, generally some point between week 24 and 28. This period uses a standard defined by the United States Supreme Court in 1973 with the Roe v. Wade ruling. On March 24, 2020, Governor Brad Little signed into law S1385, which is a trigger law stating that if and when states are again allowed to ban abortion on their own authority then abortion would be illegal in Idaho except for cases of the life of the mother, rape or incest.

=== Judicial history ===
The United States Supreme Court's decision in 1973's Roe v. Wade ruling meant the state could no longer regulate abortion in the first trimester. However, the Supreme Court overturned Roe v. Wade in Dobbs v. Jackson Women's Health Organization, No. 19-1392, 597 U.S. 215 (2022) later in 2022.

On January 5, 2023, the Idaho Supreme Court ruled that the Idaho Constitution does not confer a right to an abortion, rejecting a challenge to the states' abortion laws by Planned Parenthood.

On September 12, 2023, four women filed a lawsuit against Idaho over the state's abortion ban, stating that they were denied abortions despite having dangerous pregnancy complications. One of the women represented in the lawsuit, whose fetus was diagnosed with a fatal anomaly, gave birth prematurely in a hotel bathroom after traveling to Portland, Oregon for an abortion after being denied an abortion in Idaho. A physician in Boise also reported that several patients experiencing severe pregnancy complications at the hospital where he works had to be airlifted out of state to receive care.

On December 2, 2024, the Ninth Circuit Court of Appeals ruled that Idaho can enforce its prohibition against minors traveling out of state for abortions without parental consent.

In March 2025, the Justice Department under the Donald Trump's second term filed to drop a lawsuit the Biden administration filed in 2022 against Idaho. In the 2022 lawsuit, the Justice Department argued that the state law violated the Constitution and was preempted by federal law, as it conflicted with the federal Emergency Medical Treatment and Labor Act (EMTALA). EMTALA requires hospitals receiving Medicare funds to provide necessary stabilizing treatment for an emergency medical condition.

=== Clinic history ===
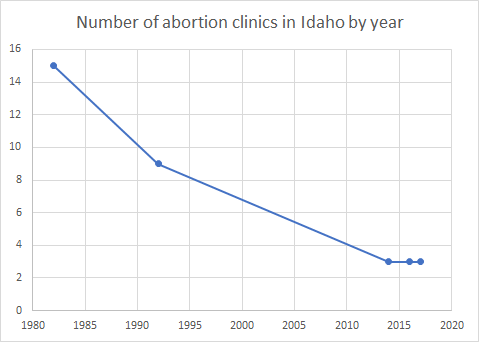
Number of abortion clinics in Idaho by year

Between 1982 and 1992, the number of abortion clinics in the state decreased by six, going from fifteen in 1982 to nine in 1992. In 2014, there were three abortion clinics in the state. In 2014, 95% of the counties in the state did not have an abortion clinic. That year, 68% of women in the state aged 15–44 lived in a county without an abortion clinic. In March 2016, there were three Planned Parenthood clinics in the state. In 2017, there were still three Planned Parenthood clinics, all of which offered abortion services, in a state with a population of 365,502 women aged 15–49. Emerg-A-Care in Jackson Hole, Wyoming also served women from Eastern Idaho.

After the decision in Dobbs v. Jackson Women's Health Organization, the three Planned Parenthood clinics in Idaho stopped offering abortion services. In 2022, there were two Planned Parenthood clinics in the state. By 2025, there was only one Planned Parenthood clinic left.

== Statistics ==
In the period between 1972 and 1974, there was only no recorded illegal abortion death in the state. In 1990, 106,000 women in the state faced the risk of an unintended pregnancy. The lowest number of legal induced abortions by state in 2000 occurred in Idaho with 801, while South Dakota was second with 878, and North Dakota was third with 1,341. Idaho had the fewest induced abortions in 2001 with 738, while South Dakota was second with 895, and North Dakota was third with 1,216. Idaho had the lowest induced abortion to live birth ratio at 36 per 1,000 live births while New York City had the highest at 767. Based on the ratio of number of women aged 15–44 years, Idaho had the lowest rate of induced abortions at 3 per 1,000 women while the District of Columbia had the highest at 37 per 1,000. In 2003, the state of South Dakota had the lowest number of legal induced abortions with 819. Idaho was second with 911, while North Dakota was third with 1,354. Idaho had the lowest ratio of induced abortions to live births at 42 per 1,000 in 2003 while New York City had the highest at 758 to 1,000. In 2010, the state had zero publicly funded abortions. In 2013, among white women aged 15–19, there were 170 abortions, zero abortions for black women aged 15–19, 40 abortions for Hispanic women aged 15–19, and 20 abortions for women of all other races. In 2014, 49% of adults said in a poll by the Pew Research Center that abortion should be illegal in all or most cases vs. 45% believing it should be legal. In 2017, the state had an infant mortality rate of 4.6 deaths per 1,000 live births.

Number of reported abortions, abortion rate and percentage change in rate by geographic region and state in 1992, 1995 and 1996
Census division and state	Number			Rate			% change 1992–1996
Census division and state	1992	1995	1996	1992	1995	1996	% change 1992–1996
US Total	1,528,930	1,363,690	1,365,730	25.9	22.9	22.9	–12
Mountain	69,600	63,390	67,020	21	17.9	18.6	–12
Arizona	20,600	18,120	19,310	24.1	19.1	19.8	–18
Colorado	19,880	15,690	18,310	23.6	18	20.9	–12
Idaho	1,710	1,500	1,600	7.2	5.8	6.1	–15
Montana	3,300	3,010	2,900	18.2	16.2	15.6	–14
Nevada	13,300	15,600	15,450	44.2	46.7	44.6	1
New Mexico	6,410	5,450	5,470	17.7	14.4	14.4	–19
Utah	3,940	3,740	3,700	9.3	8.1	7.8	–16
Wyoming	460	280	280	4.3	2.7	2.7	–37

Number, rate, and ratio of reported abortions, by reporting area of residence and occurrence and by percentage of abortions obtained by out-of-state residents, US CDC estimates
Location	Residence			Occurrence			% obtained by out-of-state residents	Year	Ref
Location	No.	Rate^	Ratio^^	No.	Rate^	Ratio^^	% obtained by out-of-state residents	Year	Ref
Idaho				1,710	7.2			1992	
Idaho				1,500	5.8			1995	
Idaho				1,600	6.1			1996	
Idaho	1,767	5.6	77	1,353	4.3	59	5.2	2014	
Idaho	1,695	5.3	74	1,272	4	56	4.6	2015	
Idaho	1,725	5.4	77	1,289	4.0	57	3.4	2016	
^number of abortions per 1,000 women aged 15–44; ^^number of abortions per 1,000 live births

== Abortion rights views and activities ==
=== Protests ===
Women from the state participated in marches supporting abortion rights as part of a #StoptheBans movement in May 2019.

Following the leak of the overturn of Roe v. Wade on May 2, 2022, an abortion rights protest was held in Boise, Idaho. On November 10, 2022, two abortion rights protesters who were present at the Boise, Idaho protests filed tort claims against the city, alleging that they were falsely arrested and imprisoned in violation of constitutional rights to peacefully assemble.

Following the overturn of Roe v. Wade on June 24, 2022, an abortion rights protest was held in Boise, Idaho outside city hall.

On June 28, 2025, hundreds of people attended a rally at the state capitol in Boise, Idaho to kick off a signature gathering campaign for a ballot initiative to end Idaho's abortion ban.

On April 14, 2026, Idahoans United for Women and Families stated that they had gathered close to 100,000 signatures for a proposed ballot initiative to end Idaho's abortion ban.

== Anti-abortion views and activities ==
The Boise March for Life is an anti-abortion march that took place every January on the weekend anniversary of Roe v. Wade, with a rally following. It is unclear whether it will still take place now that the Supreme Court has overturned Roe v. Wade in Dobbs v. Jackson Women's Health Organization, No. 19-1392, 597 U.S. ___ (2022) in 2022.

=== Violence ===
Shelley Shannon attempted to set fires at abortion clinics in Oregon, California, Idaho and Nevada during the late 1980s and early 1990s and eventually pleaded guilty to these cases of arson. In 1993, she was found guilty of attempted murder of Dr. George Tiller in 1993 at his Wichita, Kansas clinic.
