= Jeff Burkhart =

American politician (1962–2025)

- Burkhart in 2023

Member of the Tennessee House of Representatives from the 75th district
- In office January 10, 2023 – November 14, 2025
- Preceded by: Bruce Griffey
- Succeeded by: Michael Lankford

Personal details
- Born: Jeffrey Darrell Burkhart; March 16, 1962 Clarksville, Tennessee, U.S.
- Died: November 14, 2025 (aged 63) Clarksville, Tennessee, U.S.
- Party: Republican
- Domestic partner: Cindy Greene
- Children: 1
- Education: Volunteer State Community College (AA)

Jeffrey Darrell Burkhart (March 16, 1962 – November 14, 2025) was an American politician who served as a Republican member of the Tennessee House of Representatives, representing the 75th district from 2023 until his death in 2025.

== Life and career ==
Burkhart was born in Clarksville, Tennessee on March 16, 1962. He graduated from Northwest High School in 1980 and later earned his associate degree from Volunteer State Community College in 2014. Burkhart worked for the Clarksville Fire Department and started a construction company in the 1980s. He was elected to the Clarksville City Council in 2008 and served three terms.

In January 2019, after the resignation of three-term state senator Mark Green, Burkhart announced his candidacy in a special election for Tennessee's 22nd Senate district. He was defeated by Bill Powers in the Republican primary. Burkhart successfully campaigned in the 2022 election for Tennessee's 75th House district.

Burkhart had one daughter. He was engaged to Cindy Greene at the time of his death.

Burkhart died at his home, in the early hours of November 14, 2025, at the age of 63.

== Electoral history ==
=== 2019 ===
Tennessee Senate District 22 special Republican primary, 2019
Party	Candidate	Votes	%
Republican	Bill Powers	2,782	37.29%
Republican	Jeff Burkhart	2,513	33.69%
Republican	Betty Burchett	1,297	17.39%
Republican	Jason Knight	868	11.64%
Total votes		7,460	100.00%

=== 2022 ===
Republican primary
Party	Candidate	Votes	%
Republican	Jeff Burkhart	981	40.57%
Republican	Deanna McLaughlin	910	37.63%
Republican	Kent Griffy	527	21.80%
Total votes		2,418	100.00%

Tennessee House of Representatives District 75 general election, 2022
Party	Candidate	Votes	%
Republican	Jeff Burkhart	6,851	100.00%
Total votes		6,851	100.00%
Republican hold			

=== 2024 ===
2024 Tennessee House of Representatives District 75 Republican Primary
Party	Candidate	Votes	%
Republican	Jeff Burkhart (inc.)	1,160	100.00%
Total votes		1,160	100.00%

2024 Tennessee House of Representatives District 75 Election
Party	Candidate	Votes	%
Republican	Jeff Burkhart (incumbent)	11,164	54.74%
Democratic	Allie Phillips	9,230	45.26%
Total votes		20,394	100.00%
Republican hold			
