= Zurawski v. State of Texas =

Legal case concerning medical exceptions to Texas' abortion ban

Zurawski v. State of Texas is a case heard by the Texas Supreme Court regarding medical exceptions to the state's abortion ban. The lawsuit was filed by the Center for Reproductive Rights on March 6, 2023. On August 4, 2023, State District Court Judge Jessica Mangrum granted the plaintiffs a preliminary injunction; the state of Texas appealed this decision to the Texas Supreme Court later that same day. The Texas Supreme Court heard arguments in the case on November 28, 2023, and issued the decision on May 31, 2024.

== Background ==
In May 2021, Texas Governor Greg Abbott signed the Texas Heartbeat Act, also known as SB 8, into law. The law banned abortions after a fetal heartbeat could be detected, and allowed private citizens in Texas to sue anyone who helps someone obtain such an abortion. The law took effect in September of that year. After the Supreme Court of the United States overturned Roe v. Wade and Planned Parenthood v. Casey in its June 2022 decision in Dobbs v. Jackson Women's Health Organization, Texas' trigger law banning abortion went into effect on August 25, 2022. This law made performing an abortion a felony punishable by up to life in prison, with only narrow exceptions to save the life of the pregnant patient. As a result, Texas now had three abortion bans in effect simultaneously: SB8, the trigger law, and several statutes passed prior to Roe.

== Case history ==
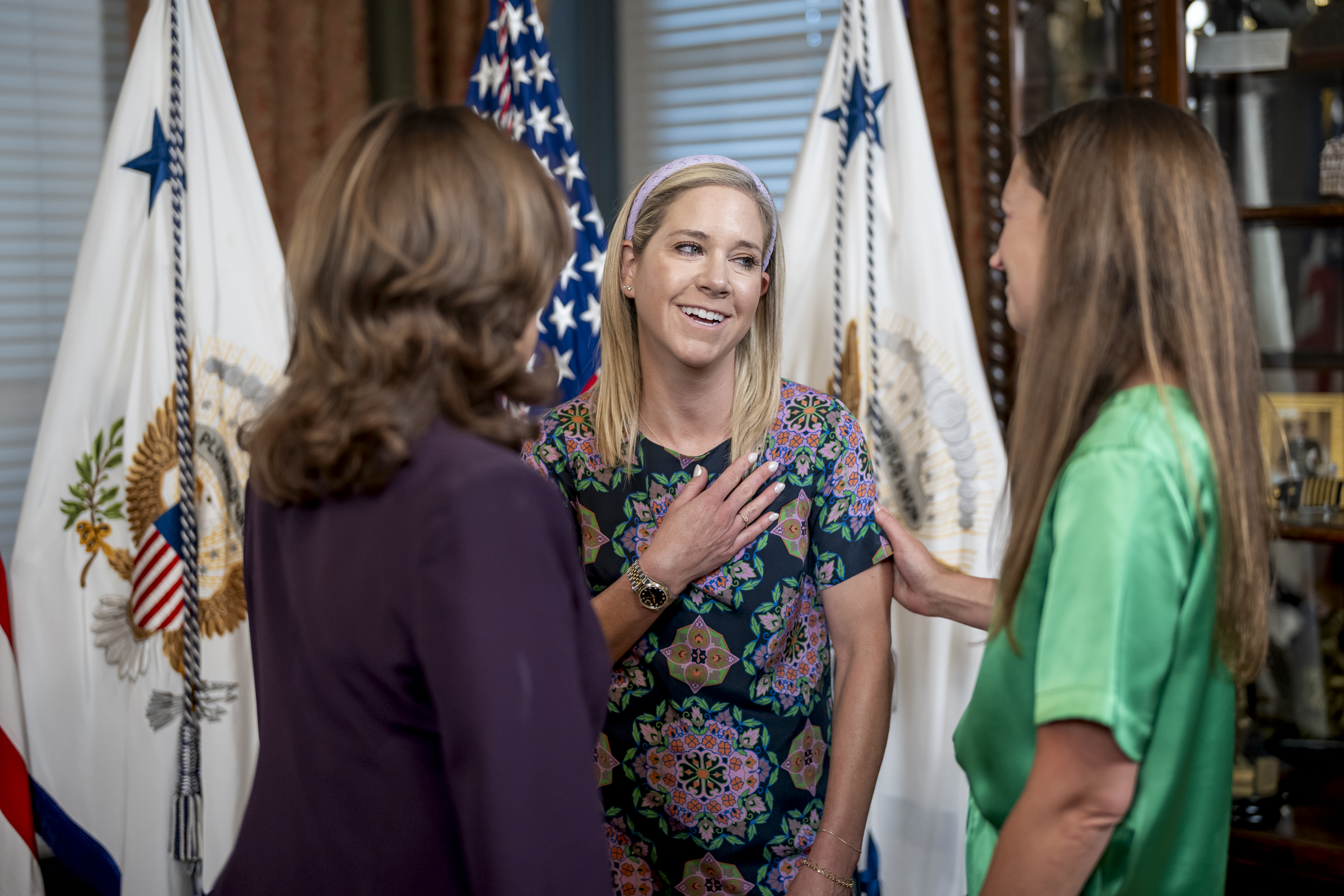
Amanda Zurawski at the White House, 2024

The case's lead plaintiff is Amanda Zurawski, a Texas woman who was denied an abortion when she was 18 weeks pregnant because her fetus had a detectable heartbeat. She subsequently went into septic shock twice, and was left with a permanently closed fallopian tube due to scar tissue. Four other women initially joined the suit when it was first filed on March 6, 2023. The purpose of the suit was to obtain a court ruling clarifying the circumstances under which physicians in Texas can provide abortion care under the state's abortion ban, unlike previous litigation where the intent was to overturn them completely. Kate Zernike of the New York Times stated that this case was "apparently the first time that pregnant women themselves have taken legal action against the bans that have shut down access to abortion across the country since the U.S. Supreme Court overturned Roe v. Wade."

In July 2023, court hearings in the case were held over a two-day period, during which time three women testified about the effects of their having been denied abortion care on their own lives. One of the women, Samantha Casiano, described being pregnant and learning that her fetus had no chance of survival, because it lacked a skull due to a condition called anencephaly. Casiano became physically ill while testifying, which prompted the judge to call a recess. Texas's lawyers accused the women of being on an "ideological crusade" and attempted to pin blame on the women themselves, as well as their physicians.

On August 4, 2023, Travis County District Judge Jessica Mangrum issued a preliminary injunction which would have prevented the state of Texas from enforcing the Texas Heartbeat Act in cases involving serious pregnancy complications. The ruling would have allowed patients to receive abortion care if they were experiencing such complications, and would have prevented the state's Attorney General from prosecuting doctors who perform abortions based on their "good faith judgment" that doing so is medically necessary. The office of the Attorney General of Texas appealed the ruling just hours later, which prevented Mangrum's injunction from taking effect. At the time, First Assistant Attorney General of Texas Brent Webster decried Mangrum's decision as "an activist Austin judge’s attempt to override Texas abortion laws."

=== Supreme Court ===
On November 28, 2023, the Texas Supreme Court heard oral arguments in Zurawski. By this time, the number of plaintiffs in the case had increased to 22: 20 women denied abortions and two physicians. During the argument, Molly Duane, a lawyer for the Center for Reproductive Rights, stated, "We are just seeking clarification on what the law aims to do". Texas Supreme Court justice Brett Busby, however, pushed back on this point, arguing that the Court's purpose is to "decide cases" rather than to "elaborate and expand" the meaning of state laws. Beth Klusmann, a lawyer representing the state of Texas, argued that the plaintiffs did not have standing to sue Texas in this matter, and should instead have filed suit against their doctors. The Texas Supreme Court will issue a decision on whether to partially block Texas' abortion ban, as well as on whether to grant the state's request to dismiss the case outright, both by June 2024.

On May 31, 2024, the Texas Supreme Court issued a unanimous decision that upheld the three laws, with one plaintiff, Dr. Karsan, having the standing to sue the state government after being threatened by the attorney general, Ken Paxton. Two justices: Brett Busby and Debra Lehrmann, issued a concurring opinion that left the door open to a broader challenge to the law, but only to overturn it completely. The court clarified that death does not have to be imminent, nor does the woman actually need to suffer physical impairment, before the abortion may proceed.

Under the Human Life Protection Act, a woman with a life-threatening physical condition and her physician have the legal authority to proceed with an abortion to save the woman’s life or major bodily function, in the exercise of reasonable medical judgment and with the woman’s informed consent.1 s our Court recently held, the law does not require that a woman’s death be imminent or that she first suffer physical impairment. Rather, Texas law permits a physician to address the risk that a life-threatening condition poses before a woman suffers the consequences of that risk. A physician who tells a patient, “Your life is threatened by a complication that has arisen during your pregnancy, and you may die, or there is a serious risk you will suffer substantial physical impairment unless an abortion is performed,” and in the same breath states “but the law won’t allow me to provide an abortion in these circumstances” is simply wrong in that legal assessment.

== Aftermath ==
In 2025, Amanda Zurawski, the lead plaintiff of the case, was named one of Time Magazine's Women Of The Year.

== See also ==
- Adkins v. State of Idaho
- Blackmon v. State of Tennessee
