= Blackmon v. State of Tennessee =

Legal case concerning medical exceptions to Tennessee's abortion ban

Blackmon v. State of Tennessee is a court case heard by the Tennessee Twelfth Judicial District Court regarding medical exceptions to the state's abortion ban, specifically relating to pregnant persons with emergent health conditions. The lawsuit was filed by the Center for Reproductive Rights on September 11, 2023, and a hearing was held April 4, 2024.

== Background ==
On April 22, 2019, Tennessee created a trigger law that would prohibit abortion from the point of fertilization in the case that Roe v. Wade was overturned.

On May 14, 2019, Tennessee prohibited abortions after the fetus was viable, generally at some point between weeks 24 and 28. This period uses a standard defined by the US Supreme Court in 1973 with the Roe v. Wade ruling and was not a result of state-based legislation. In 2020, Tennessee banned abortions related to a prenatal diagnoses of Down syndrome, as well as the fetus's gender or race.

After the Supreme Court of the United States overturned Roe v. Wade and Planned Parenthood v. Casey in its June 2022 decision in Dobbs v. Jackson Women's Health Organization, abortion became illegal from the point of conception in Tennessee on July 25, 2022, without any exceptions. In April 2023, legislation was adapted to include exceptions for physicians to use "reasonable medical judgment, based upon the facts known to the physician at the time" to perform abortions "to prevent the death of the pregnant woman or to prevent serious risk of substantial and irreversible impairment of a major bodily function of the pregnant woman"; legislation included specific guidelines regarding ectopic and molar pregnancies. Under the legislation, attempting to perform an abortion is categorized as a Class C felony, meaning those found to have illegally performed an abortion would face prison sentences and/or lose their medical license. However, the law allows for affirmative defense, wherein someone charged with the felony may argue in defense of their actions during trial.

== Case history ==
The case's lead plaintiff is Nicole Blackmon, a Tennessee woman who was denied an abortion when she was 15 weeks pregnant, at which point she learned the fetus was unlikely to survive; additionally, Blackmon's pre-existing health conditions increased her risk of stroke during labor and delivery. Unable to receive resources to receive an out-of-state abortion, Blackmon miscarried at 31 weeks. Three other patients initially joined the lawsuit in September 2023, with four more joining in January 2024. All patient plaintiffs experienced complications in pregnancy related to the patient and/or fetus's health. The suit also included two Tennessee physicians who felt incapable of providing adequate care to their patients due to the state's current legislation.

On September 11, 2023, the Center for Reproductive Rights filed a lawsuit against the State of Tennessee, claiming the current legislation is "unconstitutionally vague" and violates the Tennessee Constitution’s Due Process and Equal Protection Clauses by not protecting the life of pregnant persons. The State of Tennessee attempted to dismiss the case November 1, 2023. In January 2024, the Center filed for a temporary injunction.

The case was heard at the Twelfth Judicial District Court on April 4, 2024. During the hearing, plaintiffs argued to expand the state's medical exceptions to include fatal diagnoses. The state's legal team argued to have the case dismissed as the plaintiffs "do not have standing", in part because the physician plaintiffs reside in Nashville, where the district attorney had declared they will not prosecute abortion providers. The legal team with the Center for Reproductive Rights argued that the district attorney's statement was not legally binding and thus, should not be used to declare physicians in Nashville are safe to perform abortions. Further, the Center discussed the vagueness in current legislation, pointing to "the use of nonmedical language, ambiguous terminology, no indication of timing and the reasonable medical judgement standard". The state's legal team also asserted that the plaintiffs were not presently experiencing a medical emergency, and thus, the case referred to "hypothetical future scenarios". They also highlighted that the Center's attorneys did not mention that abortion is "the termination of another life".

On October 17, 2024, the court "stated that the ban’s exceptions are vague and confusing; outlined specific conditions under which abortion care is permitted under the state’s ban; and held that the Center would likely succeed on its constitutional claims, which include that the ban violates pregnant patients’ right to life and equal protection under the law and is unconstitutionally vague". Additionally, the court expanded the medical exceptions to include "pre-viability preterm premature rupture of membranes (PPROM); dilation of the cervix prior to viability of the pregnancy; and fatal fetal diagnoses that lead to maternal health conditions such as severe preeclampsia or infection that would result in uterine rupture or potential loss of fertility."

== See also ==
- Adkins v. State of Idaho
- Cox v. Texas
- Zurawski v. State of Texas
