= Jim Wayne =

American politician

Member of the Kentucky House of Representatives from the 35th district
- In office January 1, 1991 – January 1, 2019
- Preceded by: Carl Nett
- Succeeded by: Lisa Willner

Personal details
- Born: May 21, 1948 (age 78) Louisville, KY.
- Party: Democratic Party
- Spouse: Deborah K. Wayne
- Education: Maryknoll College (B.A), Smith College (M.S.W.), Spalding University (M.F.A.)
- Occupation: Psychotherapist

James Stuart Wayne (born May 21, 1948) is a politician from Kentucky and was a Democratic Party member of the Kentucky House of Representatives, representing District 35 from 1991 until 2019. Wayne was first elected to the house in 1990, defeating Democratic incumbent Carl Nett for renomination. He served on the Appropriations and Revenue, State Government, Local Government and Capital Projects and Bond Oversight Committees as well as the Governor's Blue Ribbon Commission on Tax Reform (2012) and the Kentucky Housing Policy Advisory Board. He is a champion of tax reform, affordable housing, campus safety, enhancing penalties for sexual abuse of minors and protection of workers and the vulnerable. Former Representative Jim Wayne was the only mental health professional in the KY State House of Representatives. He chose to retire in 2018. His old state congressional seat is now occupied by Lisa Willner, the only current mental health professional in the KY State House.
