= Allie Phillips =

American politician (born 1995)

Member-elect of the Tennessee House of Representatives from the 75th district
- Assuming office January 12, 2027
- Succeeding: Michael Lankford

Personal details
- Born: February 17, 1995 (age 31)
- Party: Democratic
- Spouse: Bryan Lynch
- Children: 2
- Education: Middle Tennessee State University (BS)
- Website: House website

Allie Phillips (born February 17, 1995) is an American politician and abortion rights activist. She is the Democratic member-elect of the Tennessee House of Representatives from the 75th district, defeating Michael Lankford. After having to travel to New York to get an abortion due to Tennessee's strict abortion ban, she shared her experiences on social media and joined a lawsuit against the state's abortion ban. She ran in the Tennessee House of Representatives 75th district in 2024 and 2025, before winning the district in 2026.

== Biography ==
=== Early life and abortion rights advocacy ===
Allie Phillips was born on February 17, 1995. She attended McGavock High School and Middle Tennessee State University, where she obtained her bachelor's degree in multimedia journalism in 2017. She became a daycare operator, with her workplace being her home. She had one child with her husband, forklift mechanic Bryan Lynch, in 2017 or 2018. She is also a communications professional.

During an ultrasound while 19 weeks pregnant with a second child, Phillips learned that the unborn child had several health complications "not compatible with life outside the womb", including semilobar holoprosencephaly, and that she would also have health problems if she remained pregnant. Subsequently, Phillips was informed that she would have a miscarriage. Due to the outcome of Dobbs v. Jackson Women's Health Organization, which overturned abortion rights throughout the United States, Tennessee bans abortion with exemptions her situation did not meet. Therefore, she had to leave the state to get an abortion, requiring a fundraiser due to the family's financial situation. She finally had the abortion at a New York clinic, by which time she was nearing a septic infection.

Phillips began posting on social media about her experiences, including on TikTok. She also was a plaintiff in Blackmon v. State of Tennessee, a Center for Reproductive Rights lawsuit against Tennessee over its abortion law.

=== Political career ===
Phillips was recruited by Montgomery County Democrats chair Charles Uffelman, who had seen some of her TikTok shorts, to run in the Tennessee House of Representatives 75th district. She won the Democratic primary unopposed in August 2024, but lost the general election to Republican incumbent Jeff Burkhart in November 2024. Following Burkhart's death in November 2025, she ran in a special election voted on by the Montgomery County Commission; during the final runoff round, she tied 9-9 with Republican Michael Lankford, before county mayor Wes Golden broke the tie in Lankford's favor.

Phillips ran against Lankford in another rematch in the 2026 Tennessee House of Representatives election. Again winning the Democratic primary unopposed, she defeated Lankford in the November 2026 general election, 55% to 45%. Emma Specter of Vogue called it an example of 2026 midterm victories which "felt like a riposte to a range of Republican transgressions".

Phillips lives in Clarksville.
