= Lisa Willner =

American politician

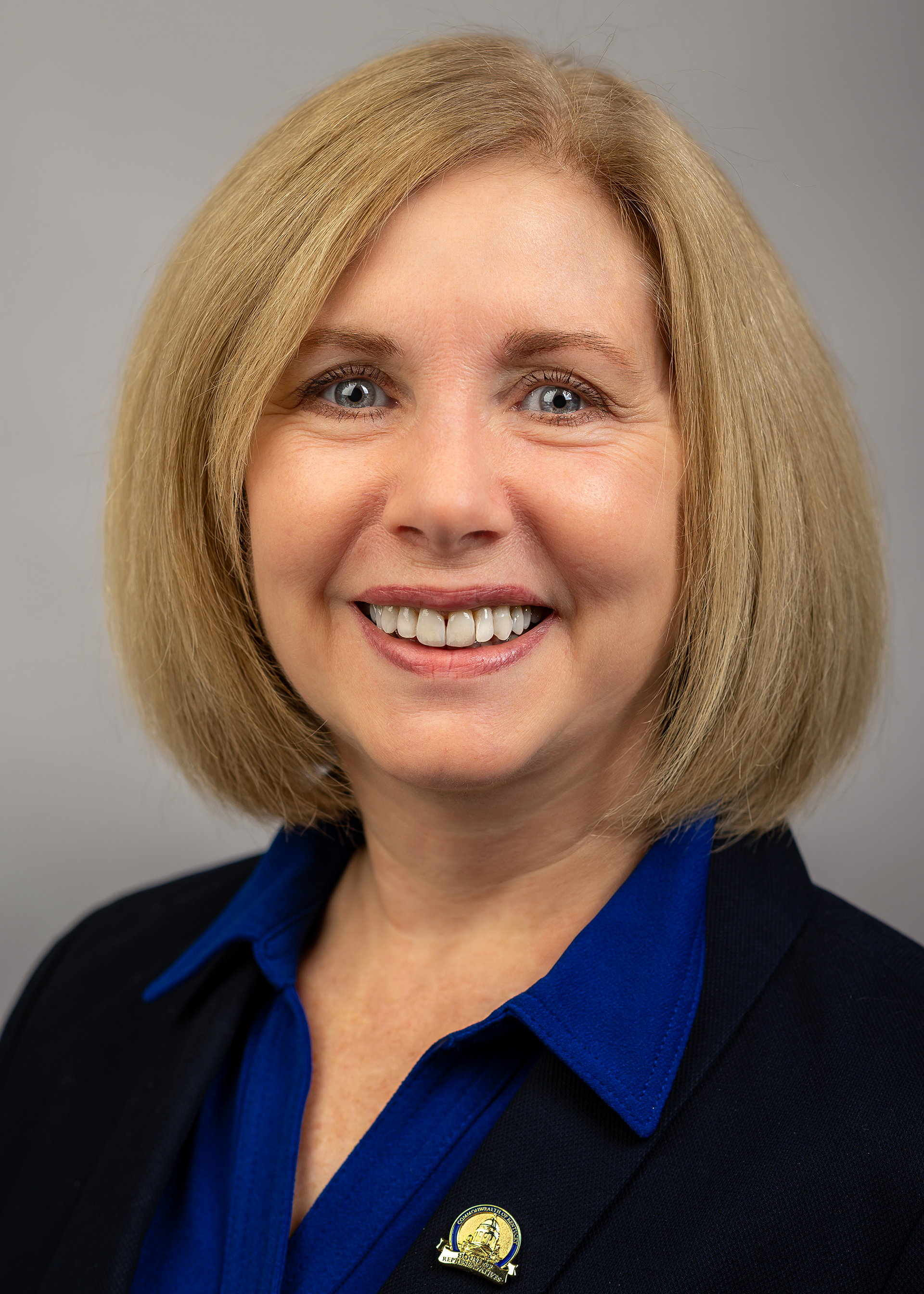

Member of the Kentucky House of Representatives from the 35th district
- Incumbent
- Assumed office January 1, 2019
- Preceded by: Jim Wayne

Member of the Jefferson County Board of Education from the 6th district
- In office January 2015 – January 2019
- Preceded by: Carol A. Haddad
- Succeeded by: Corrie Shull

Personal details
- Born: March 9, 1959 (age 67)
- Party: Democratic

Lisa Gail Willner (born March 9, 1959) is an American politician from Kentucky, serving as a Democratic member of the Kentucky House of Representatives from the 35th House district since January 2019.

== Electoral history ==
=== 2014 ===
2014 Jefferson County Board of Education 6th district election
| Party | Candidate | Votes | % |
|---|---|---|---|
| Nonpartisan | Lisa Willner | 14,269 | 54.2 |
| Nonpartisan | Carol A. Haddad (incumbent) | 7,521 | 28.6 |
| Nonpartisan | Patrick Hughes | 4,519 | 17.2 |
| Total votes | | 26,309 | 100.0 |

=== 2018 ===
Democratic primary results
| Party | Candidate | Votes | % |
|---|---|---|---|
| Democratic | Lisa Willner | 2,788 | 57.3 |
| Democratic | Richard Beckner | 1,407 | 28.9 |
| Democratic | Jack W. Walker | 671 | 13.8 |
| Total votes | | 4,866 | 100.0 |

2018 Kentucky House of Representatives 35th district election
| Party | Candidate | Votes | % |
|---|---|---|---|
| Democratic | Lisa Willner | 10,279 | 68.1 |
| Republican | Donna D. Lawlor | 4,812 | 31.9 |
| Total votes | | 15,091 | 100.0 |
| Democratic hold | | | |

=== 2020 ===
2020 Kentucky House of Representatives 35th district election
| Party | Candidate | Votes | % |
|---|---|---|---|
| Democratic | Lisa Willner (incumbent) | Unopposed | |
| Total votes | | 14,224 | 100.0 |
| Democratic hold | | | |

=== 2022 ===
2022 Kentucky House of Representatives 35th district election
| Party | Candidate | Votes | % |
|---|---|---|---|
| Democratic | Lisa Willner (incumbent) | Unopposed | |
| Total votes | | 6,381 | 100.0 |
| Democratic hold | | | |

=== 2024 ===
2024 Kentucky House of Representatives 35th district election
| Party | Candidate | Votes | % |
|---|---|---|---|
| Democratic | Lisa Willner (incumbent) | Unopposed | |
| Total votes | | 8,662 | 100.0 |
| Democratic hold | | | |
