= Tim Wirgau =

American politician

Member of the Tennessee House of Representatives from the 75th district
- In office January 11, 2011 – January 8, 2019
- Preceded by: Willie Borchert
- Succeeded by: Bruce Griffey

Personal details
- Born: Timothy Wirgau; September 2, 1963 (age 63) Towanda, Pennsylvania, U.S.
- Party: Republican
- Spouse: Bonnie
- Children: 2
- Education: Glen Oaks Community College
- Occupation: Politician; print shop owner

Timothy Wirgau (born September 2, 1963) is an American business owner and politician who was a member of the Tennessee House of Representatives, representing the 75th district from 2011 to 2019. He is a Republican.

== Early life and education ==
Timothy Wirgau was born on September 2, 1963, in Towanda, Pennsylvania. He graduated from Bronson High School in Bronson, Michigan and later attended Glen Oaks Community College. He later moved to Paris, Tennessee where he established a printing business, Abbotts Print Shop.

== Tennessee House of Representatives (2011–2019) ==
=== Elections ===
In 2008, Wirgau ran in the Tennessee 75th House district against Democrat incumbent Willie Borchert. Wirgau easily prevailed in a three-way Republican primary, but narrowly lost the general election to Borchert by a roughly 300-vote margin.

In 2010, Wirgau again challenged Borchert. He won the Republican primary unopposed, and later defeated Borchert in the general election winning roughly 68 percent of the district's votes.

In 2012, Wirgau ran for re-election, winning the Republican primary unopposed, and defeating Democrat Steve Wright and independent James Hart.

In 2018, Wirgau ran for re-election to a fifth term in office. However, he was defeated by Bruce Griffey in the Republican primary. Griffey went on to win the general election.
