= Bruce Griffey =

American politician (born 1963)

Member of the Tennessee House of Representatives from the 75th district
- In office January 8, 2019 – August 31, 2022
- Preceded by: Tim Wirgau
- Succeeded by: Jeff Burkhart

Personal details
- Born: February 1963 (age 63)
- Party: Republican
- Spouse: Rebecca
- Children: 2
- Education: University of Mississippi (BA, JD)
- Occupation: Politician; attorney

Bruce I. Griffey (born February 1963) is an American attorney and politician from the state of Tennessee. A Republican, Griffey represented the 75th district of the Tennessee House of Representatives, based in Henry, Benton, and Stewart Counties, from 2019 to 2022. He has served as the Tennessee 24th District Circuit Court Judge since 2022.

== Career ==
=== Tennessee House of Representatives ===
Before running for elected office, Griffey worked as an assistant district attorney for the 24th Judicial District and an assistant attorney general for the state of Tennessee. He also owns and continues to practice at his own law firm.

In 2018, Griffey challenged State Representative Tim Wirgau in the Republican primary for the 75th district, criticizing Wirgau for voting for a fuel tax increase and in-state tuition for undocumented immigrants. Griffey defeated Wirgau in the primary with 58% of the vote, and went on to win the general election easily in the heavily-Republican district.

Griffey came under fire in 2019 after it was revealed that he had attempted to persuade Governor Bill Lee to appoint his wife, Rebecca Griffey, to an open judge position. In 2021, Griffey introduced legislation to ban textbooks and teaching materials in Tennessee public schools that contain LGBT content. Griffey resigned from the Tennessee House of Representatives in August 2022 after being elected to serve as the Tennessee 24th District Circuit Court Judge.

== Personal life ==
Griffey lives in Paris with his wife, Rebecca, and their two children.
