= Willie Borchert =

American politician (1937–2020)

Willie "Butch" Borchert
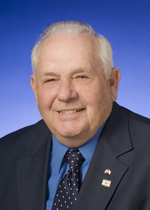
- Borchert in 2007

Member of the Tennessee House of Representatives from the 75th district
- In office January 8, 2003 – January 11, 2011
- Preceded by: L. Don Ridgeway
- Succeeded by: Tim Wirgau

Personal details
- Born: May 12, 1937 Benton County, Tennessee, U.S.
- Died: January 7, 2020 (aged 82) Camden, Tennessee, U.S.
- Party: Democratic
- Spouse: Christine
- Children: 1
- Occupation: Politician; pipefitter; restaurant owner
- Website: House website

Willie "Butch" Borchert (May 12, 1937 – January 7, 2020) was an American politician and a former Democratic member of the Tennessee House of Representatives, representing the Tennessee House of Representatives 75th district from January 2003 until January 2011.

== Early life and career ==
Willie Borchert was born on May 12, 1937, in Benton County, Tennessee, to parents Harvey Borchert and Irene Salyers Borchert. Borchert became a pipefitter with the Local 572 and owned The Catfish Place Restaurant in Camden.

== Tennessee House of Representatives (2003–2011) ==
=== Elections ===
In 2002, Borchert ran for the 75th district of the Tennessee House, winning and succeeding fellow Democrat L. Don Ridgeway. In 2010, Borchert was defeated by Tim Wirgau, a Republican.

=== Tenure ===
Borchert served as a House member during the 103rd through 105th General Assemblies. He served as Vice Chair of the House Agriculture Committee and House Wildlife Subcommittee. He also served as a Member of the House Conservation and Environment Committee, the House Joint Veterans Affairs Committee, as well as the House Parks and Tourism Subcommittee.

== Personal life ==
Borchert married his wife Christine, and they had one son together. The family lived in Camden, Tennessee. On January 7, 2020, Borchert died at the Camden General Hospital.

Borchert was a Baptist.
