= Kentucky's 35th House of Representatives district =

American legislative district

Kentucky's 35th State House of Representatives district
Representative
Lisa Willner; D–Louisville
since January 1, 2019
- Registration: 55.9% Democratic; 31.1% Republican; 12.2% No party preference
- Demographics: 47.4% White; 24.9% Black; 19.2% Hispanic; 3.9% Asian; 0.1% Native American; 0.1% Hawaiian/Pacific Islander; 0.5% Other; 4.0% Multiracial
- Population (2024): 43,336
- Registered voters (2026): 25,111

Kentucky's 35th House of Representatives district is one of 100 districts in the Kentucky House of Representatives. It comprises part of Jefferson County. It has been represented by Lisa Willner (D–Louisville) since 2019. As of 2024, the district had a population of 43,336.

== Voter registration ==
On January 1, 2026, the district had 25,111 registered voters, who were registered with the following parties.

Party	Registration	
Party	Voters	%
Democratic	14,048	55.94
Republican	7,820	31.14
Independent	1,248	4.97
Libertarian	111	0.44
Green	34	0.14
Constitution	17	0.07
Socialist Workers	9	0.04
Reform	0	0.00
"Other"	1,824	7.26
Total	25,111	100.00

== List of members representing the district ==
Member	Party	Years	Electoral history	District location
Carl Nett (Louisville)	Democratic	January 1, 1970 – January 1, 1991	Elected in 1969. Reelected in 1971. Reelected in 1973. Reelected in 1975. Reelected in 1977. Reelected in 1979. Reelected in 1981. Reelected in 1984. Reelected in 1986. Reelected in 1988. Lost renomination.	1964–1972; Jefferson County (part).
Carl Nett (Louisville)	Democratic	January 1, 1970 – January 1, 1991	Elected in 1969. Reelected in 1971. Reelected in 1973. Reelected in 1975. Reelected in 1977. Reelected in 1979. Reelected in 1981. Reelected in 1984. Reelected in 1986. Reelected in 1988. Lost renomination.	1972–1974; Jefferson County (part).
Carl Nett (Louisville)	Democratic	January 1, 1970 – January 1, 1991	Elected in 1969. Reelected in 1971. Reelected in 1973. Reelected in 1975. Reelected in 1977. Reelected in 1979. Reelected in 1981. Reelected in 1984. Reelected in 1986. Reelected in 1988. Lost renomination.	1974–1985; Jefferson County (part).
Carl Nett (Louisville)	Democratic	January 1, 1970 – January 1, 1991	Elected in 1969. Reelected in 1971. Reelected in 1973. Reelected in 1975. Reelected in 1977. Reelected in 1979. Reelected in 1981. Reelected in 1984. Reelected in 1986. Reelected in 1988. Lost renomination.	1985–1993; Jefferson County (part).
Jim Wayne (Louisville)	Democratic	January 1, 1991 – January 1, 2019	Elected in 1990. Reelected in 1992. Reelected in 1994. Reelected in 1996. Reelected in 1998. Reelected in 2000. Reelected in 2002. Reelected in 2004. Reelected in 2006. Reelected in 2008. Reelected in 2010. Reelected in 2012. Reelected in 2014. Reelected in 2016. Retired.	1985–1993; Jefferson County (part).
Jim Wayne (Louisville)	Democratic	January 1, 1991 – January 1, 2019	Elected in 1990. Reelected in 1992. Reelected in 1994. Reelected in 1996. Reelected in 1998. Reelected in 2000. Reelected in 2002. Reelected in 2004. Reelected in 2006. Reelected in 2008. Reelected in 2010. Reelected in 2012. Reelected in 2014. Reelected in 2016. Retired.	1993–1997; Jefferson County (part).
Jim Wayne (Louisville)	Democratic	January 1, 1991 – January 1, 2019	Elected in 1990. Reelected in 1992. Reelected in 1994. Reelected in 1996. Reelected in 1998. Reelected in 2000. Reelected in 2002. Reelected in 2004. Reelected in 2006. Reelected in 2008. Reelected in 2010. Reelected in 2012. Reelected in 2014. Reelected in 2016. Retired.	1997–2003
Jim Wayne (Louisville)	Democratic	January 1, 1991 – January 1, 2019	Elected in 1990. Reelected in 1992. Reelected in 1994. Reelected in 1996. Reelected in 1998. Reelected in 2000. Reelected in 2002. Reelected in 2004. Reelected in 2006. Reelected in 2008. Reelected in 2010. Reelected in 2012. Reelected in 2014. Reelected in 2016. Retired.	2003–2015
Jim Wayne (Louisville)	Democratic	January 1, 1991 – January 1, 2019	Elected in 1990. Reelected in 1992. Reelected in 1994. Reelected in 1996. Reelected in 1998. Reelected in 2000. Reelected in 2002. Reelected in 2004. Reelected in 2006. Reelected in 2008. Reelected in 2010. Reelected in 2012. Reelected in 2014. Reelected in 2016. Retired.	2015–2023
Lisa Willner (Louisville)	Democratic	January 1, 2019 – present	Elected in 2018. Reelected in 2020. Reelected in 2022. Reelected in 2024. Reelected in 2026.	2015–2023
Lisa Willner (Louisville)	Democratic	January 1, 2019 – present	Elected in 2018. Reelected in 2020. Reelected in 2022. Reelected in 2024. Reelected in 2026.	2023–present
