= Abortion in North Carolina =

As of July 1, 2023, abortion in North Carolina is currently legal until 12 weeks of pregnancy. In the case of rape or incest, abortion is legal through the 20th week of pregnancy. In the case of a "life-limiting" fetal abnormality, abortion is legal through the 24th week of pregnancy. If the woman's life is determined by a qualified physician to be at risk, abortion is legal at any stage of pregnancy. North Carolina is a destination for many out-of-state women seeking abortions, as most US Southern states have implemented laws banning abortion after six weeks of pregnancy or near-total prohibitions on abortion.

Abortion related legislation existed in North Carolina by 1900, which included a therapeutic exception. National research carried out in 1967 included North Carolina data to derive estimates related to abortion procedures. State Targeted Regulation of Abortion Providers (TRAP) laws were in place by 2013. North Carolina abortion laws have been before the federal judiciary, including in March 2019 when U.S. District Judge William Osteen formally struck down North Carolina's life of the mother only 20-week abortion ban.

The number of abortion-providing facilities in North Carolina, including freestanding abortion clinics, has declined over the years, with: 114 facilities providing abortions in 1982, 86 facilities providing abortions in 1992, 27 facilities providing abortions in 2014 (16 of which were freestanding abortion clinics), and 26 facilities providing abortions in 2017 (14 of which were freestanding clinics). The total number of abortions in the state have generally declined over time, with a 36% decrease from 1980 to 2013. There is an abortion rights activist community in the state, with women participating in the #YouKnowMe movement, and in the #StoptheBans movement in May 2019. There is also an anti-abortion rights movement in the state.

In 2017, Lindsay Beyerstein and Martyna Starosta directed Care in Chaos, a short documentary that centered around the experiences of an abortion clinic director dealing with daily anti-abortion protesting outside of an abortion clinic in Charlotte, North Carolina. This documentary won the category of "best documentary short" at the Nevada International Film Festival.

== History ==
In 1967, a group of North Carolina–based researchers published estimates for the number of abortions performed in the United States; using data from North Carolina, they estimated that 699,000 induced abortions had been performed in 1955 and that the annual number had risen to 829,000 in 1967.

Thousands of women came from out of state in 2015 to get abortions in North Carolina and Georgia. 14.5% of all abortions in Georgia that year were for out-of-state residents, while 7.5% of all abortions performed in North Carolina were performed for out-of-state residents. This contrasted to neighboring South Carolina, where only 5.9% of abortions performed in the state involved out-of-state residents.

=== Legislative history ===
By the end of the 1800s, all states except Louisiana had therapeutic exceptions in their legislative bans on abortions. In the 19th century, bans by state legislatures on abortion were about protecting the life of the mother given the number of deaths caused by abortions; state governments saw themselves as looking out for the lives of their citizens. In the late 1960s and early 1970s, Arkansas, Colorado, Georgia, Maryland, New Mexico, North Carolina and Oregon made reforms to their abortion laws, with most of these states providing more detailed medical guidance on when therapeutic abortions could be performed.

In 2013, state Targeted Regulation of Abortion Providers (TRAP) law applied to medication-induced abortions in addition to abortion clinics. Nebraska and North Carolina had laws prohibiting abortions after 20 weeks. This law was still in place in mid-2019.

On May 3, 2023, a proposed 12 week abortion ban was rushed through the North Carolina General Assembly in less than 24 hours. Representative Tricia Cotham helped the measure to pass, abruptly switching positions after campaigning on abortion rights in 2022. After Governor Roy Cooper vetoed the 12 week ban on May 13, the state legislature overrode the governor's veto and passed a 12-week abortion ban on May 16, 2023.

In 2026, Representative Keith Kidwell backed House Bill 1232, which would grant personhood to fertilized eggs, embryos and fetuses, charge people who get abortions with first degree murder and allow the use of "deadly force" against people seeking abortions.

=== Judicial history ===
The US Supreme Court's decision in 1973's Roe v. Wade ruling meant the state could no longer regulate abortion in the first trimester. However, the Supreme Court overturned Roe v. Wade in Dobbs v. Jackson Women's Health Organization, No. 19-1392, 597 U.S. ___ (2022) later in 2022. U.S. District Judge William Osteen formally struck down North Carolina's 'life of the mother only' 20-week abortion ban in March 2019. His judgement pushed the date of which abortions could be performed to the date of viability, which is later for many women. A 2022 ruling reinstated the 20-week abortion ban.

On July 26, 2024, U.S. District Judge Catherine Eagles issued a permanent injunction to the 2023 abortion law in the law requiring doctors to document the location of a pregnancy before prescribing abortion pills, but restored enforcement of another provision in the law that required abortions after 12 weeks of pregnancy to be performed in hospitals. The ruling means most of the changes to North Carolina's abortion laws since the end of Roe v. Wade remain in place.

=== Clinic history ===
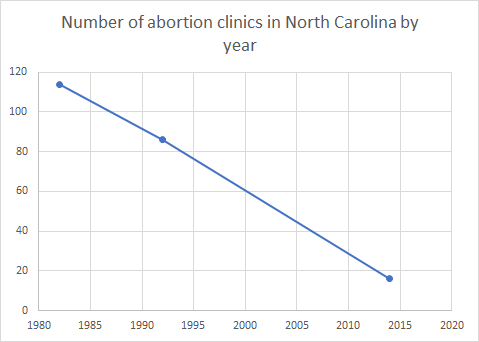
Number of abortion clinics in North Carolina by year

Between 1982 and 1992, the number of abortion clinics in the state decreased by 28, going from 114 in 1982 to 86 in 1992. In the period between 1992 and 1996, the state ranked second in the loss of number of abortion clinics, losing 27 to have a total of 59 in 1996. In 2014, there were 27 facilities that provided abortions, of which sixteen were abortion clinics. In 2014, 90% of the counties in the state did not have an abortion clinic. That year, 53% of women in the state aged 15–44 lived in a county without an abortion clinic. In 2017, there were 26 total abortion-providing facilities (with 14 total clinics including 9 Planned Parenthood clinics, of which 5 offered abortion services) in a state with a population of 2,335,631 women aged 15–49. Not all people who seek abortions in North Carolina are residents of the state, as clinics in cities near the borders attract people seeking abortions from other states.

== State restrictions on abortion ==
- Patients must receive state-directed counseling, read to them either in-person or over the phone at least 72 hours before their abortion procedure. This state-directed counseling is mandated by the North Carolina Women's Right to Know Act, passed in 2011. Information in this counseling includes: the name of the physician performing the abortion, medical risks associated with abortion and with carrying the pregnancy to term, public and private state resources available for prenatal care including the location of a hospital within 30 miles that provides OB-Gyn care, that an ultrasound must be provided prior to the abortion and the patient has the right to view the ultrasound, parental support laws that require the father of the child to pay child support, alternatives to abortion such as adoption, that the patient is free to withdraw informed consent at any time, and the probable gestational age of pregnancy at time of the abortion.
- A patient is required to have an ultrasound before an abortion is performed. The North Carolina Women's Right to Know Act originally contained a "real time view requirement" where physicians were required to provide a simultaneous explanation during an obstetric ultrasound and place ultrasound images in the view of the patient. This part of the bill was struck down by a federal judge in 2014.
- Qualified physicians are the only parties legally able to perform abortions in North Carolina.
- Telemedicine for medication abortion is prohibited in North Carolina, and has been since 2013. With the 2019–2020 COVID-19 epidemic, there has been increased focus by researchers, abortion rights activists and public health experts on the use of telemedicine for the provision of medication abortion nationwide.
- Health insurance coverage of abortion is prohibited for plans that are a part of the state's health exchange under the Affordable Care Act. This provision has exceptions for cases of life endangerment, rape, and incest. Public employees insurance plans are prohibited from covering abortion. Public funding for abortion is also subject to these limitations.
- Parental consent is required for minors, those under the age of eighteen, to receive abortion care. North Carolina requires written consent from a parent or legal guardian, or for a minor to obtain a judicial bypass. This law was held to be constitutional in Manning v. Hunt, 119 F.3d 254 (4th Cir. 1997).
- Sex-selective abortion is prohibited.
- North Carolina allows any provider or hospital with an opposition to abortion to opt out of the performance of abortion procedures through "conscience protections."
- North Carolina banned abortions performed after 20 weeks gestation from 1967 to 2019. Before Roe v. Wade (1973) was overturned in 2022, abortion pre-viability was protected. This ban was amended in 2015 to limit exceptions to this law to medical emergencies defined by G.S. 90–21.81(5)., where abortion must be performed in a licensed hospital by a board certified physician. The passage of this amendment was a catalyst for a lawsuit by The Center for Reproductive Rights, the ACLU, and Planned Parenthood Federation of America, resulting in the N.C. federal case Bryant v. Woodall. This law was struck down as unconstitutional on March 25, 2019, by U.S. District Court Judge William Osteen Jr. Abortions after 20 weeks are also required to be provided in a licensed hospital, rather than an abortion clinic. Abortion rights activists state that this law is unconstitutional based on the precedent established in the 1983 Supreme Court case City of Akron v. Akron Center for Reproductive Health (462 U.S. 416).
- Article 11 Section 14-46.1. prohibits the sale of any products of conception resulting from an abortion or miscarriage.
- Abortion clinics in N.C. are required to be certified as an abortion clinic by a state license. Clinics are subject to various regulations including required components, temperature and air ventilation regulations, and may be required to comply with ambulatory surgical center requirements. This last provision is similar to Texas H.B.2, a law struck down by the 2016 Supreme Court case Whole Woman's Health v. Hellerstedt.
- The 1994 federal Freedom of Access to Clinic Entrances Act (FACE) makes it a federal crime to use force or the threat of force to prohibit anyone from entering clinics to obtain reproductive healthcare services. North Carolina has a state corollary to this law, with misdemeanor charges for anyone who prohibits access to a healthcare facility, injures or threatens another person accessing healthcare services, or possesses a dangerous weapon at a private healthcare facility.

== Statistics ==
In the period between 1972 and 1974, the state had an illegal abortion mortality rate per million women aged 15–44 of between 1.1 and 1.9. In 1990, 774,000 women in the state faced the risk of an unintended pregnancy. In 2010, the state had three publicly funded abortions, of which were all federally funded and none were state funded. The abortion rate in North Carolina increased between 2011 and 2014 by 3%.

In 2013, among white women aged 15–19, there were 1,110 abortions, 1380 abortions for black women aged 15–19, 310 abortions for Hispanic women aged 15–19, and 160 abortions for women of all other races. In 2014, 49% of adults said in a poll by the Pew Research Center that abortion should be legal in all or most cases. The 2023 American Values Atlas reported that, in their most recent survey, 66% of people from North Carolina said that abortion should be legal in all or most cases. In 2017, the state had an infant mortality rate of 7.1 deaths per 1,000 live births.

Between 2014 and 2017, there was a 3% decline in the abortion; it went from 15.1 to 14.6 abortions per 1,000 women of reproductive age. Abortions in North Carolina represent 3.4% of all abortions in the United States.

Number of reported abortions, abortion rate and percentage change in rate by geographic region and state in 1992, 1995 and 1996
Census division and state	Number			Rate			% change 1992–1996
Census division and state	1992	1995	1996	1992	1995	1996	% change 1992–1996
South Atlantic	269,200	261,990	263,600	25.9	24.6	24.7	–5
Delaware	5,730	5,790	4,090	35.2	34.4	24.1	–32
District of Columbia	21,320	21,090	20,790	138.4	151.7	154.5	12
Florida	84,680	87,500	94,050	30	30	32	7
Georgia	39,680	36,940	37,320	24	21.2	21.1	–12
Maryland	31,260	30,520	31,310	26.4	25.6	26.3	0
North Carolina	36,180	34,600	33,550	22.4	21	20.2	–10
South Carolina	12,190	11,020	9,940	14.2	12.9	11.6	–19
Virginia	35,020	31,480	29,940	22.7	20	18.9	–16
West Virginia	3,140	3,050	2,610	7.7	7.6	6.6	–14

Number, rate, and ratio of reported abortions, by reporting area of residence and occurrence and by percentage of abortions obtained by out-of-state residents, US CDC estimates
Location	Residence			Occurrence			% obtained by out-of-state residents	Year	Ref
Location	No.	Rate^	Ratio^^	No.	Rate^	Ratio^^	% obtained by out-of-state residents	Year	Ref
North Carolina				36,180	22.4			1992	
North Carolina				34,600	21			1995	
North Carolina				33,550	20.2			1996	
North Carolina	21,385	10.8	177	24,605	12.4	203	14.5	2014	
North Carolina	23,066	11.6	191	27,631	13.9	229	17.5	2015	
North Carolina	23,168	11.6	192	27,138	13.6	225	16.8	2016	
^number of abortions per 1,000 women aged 15–44; ^^number of abortions per 1,000 live births

== Post-Dobbs pregnancy related deaths ==
On November 19, 2023, 34-year old Ciji Graham of Greensboro, North Carolina died of heart failure after doctors refused to treat her atrial fibrillation because she was 6 weeks pregnant. Graham was unable to get an abortion in time for treatment.

== Abortion rights views activities ==
=== Activism ===
In May 2019, women from the state participated in the #YouKnowMe movement.

=== Protests ===
Women from the state participated in marches supporting abortion rights as part of a #StoptheBans movement in May 2019.

In November 2020, Reiley Baker, a UNC Chapel Hill student from Charlotte, started a petition to stop a prayer walk organized by Love Life. The petition was signed by 137,000 people on change.org over three days. "They'll travel back to their communities across North Carolina and possibly spread COVID-19," Baker told The Charlotte Observer.

Following the overturn of Roe v. Wade on June 24, 2022, hundreds of abortion rights protesters turned out to protest in various cities in North Carolina, including Charlotte, Asheville, Raleigh, and Wilmington.

In Raleigh, North Carolina on May 3, 2023, hundreds of abortion rights protesters rallied at the North Carolina General Assembly in opposition to a proposed 12-week abortion ban that was rushed through the legislature in less than 24 hours. On May 13, hundreds of abortion rights protesters rallied in Raleigh as Governor Roy Cooper vetoed the 12-week abortion ban. On May 16, abortion rights protests continued after the state legislature overrode the governor's veto and passed the 12-week abortion ban.

== Anti-abortion views and activities ==
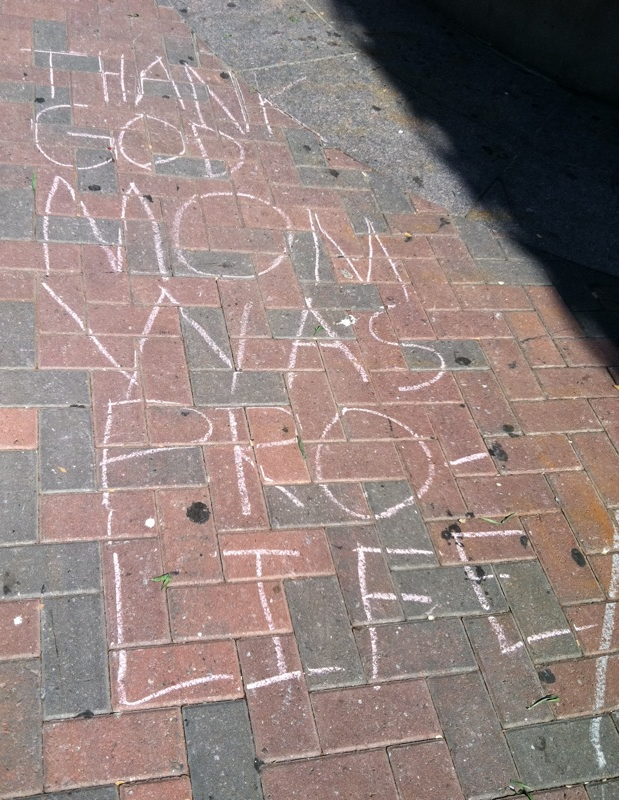
Anti-Abortion Chalking Outside Time Warner Cable Center in 2012 in Charlotte

=== Violence ===
An incident of anti-abortion violence occurred at an abortion clinic in Greensboro, North Carolina, on March 17, 1991. A man set fires at two Greensboro abortion clinics on March 17 and 19, 1991. Although he had schizophrenia, he was found mentally competent and pled guilty to arson in 1993. N.C. Right to Life president Jim Lung condemned the violence. Another arson occurred in 1997, and a clinic in Asheville was bombed in 1999.
