= Abortion in Tennessee =

Abortion in Tennessee is illegal from fertilization except to "prevent the death of the pregnant woman or to prevent serious risk of substantial and irreversible impairment of a major bodily function of the pregnant woman". Tennessee is one of four states in which abortion is banned by the state constitution; alongside Alabama, Louisiana, and West Virginia.

The ban took effect on August 25, 2022, thirty days after the Tennessee Attorney General notified the Tennessee Code Commission that Roe v. Wade was overturned on June 24, 2022. Following the Dobbs v. Jackson Women's Health Organization decision, it became the only state with no direct exception in case of risk to the pregnant individual's life; rather, there was an affirmative defense included in the ban, meaning that someone who performed an abortion could be charged with a felony, but only had an opportunity to prove that the procedure was necessary — either to prevent the patient from dying or to prevent serious risk of what the law calls "substantial and irreversible impairment of a major bodily function."

The number of abortion clinics in Tennessee decreased over the years, with 128 in 1982, 33 in 1992, and 7 in 2014. There were 12,373 legal abortions in 2014, and 11,411 in 2015.

The 2023 American Values Atlas reported that, in their most recent survey, 53% of people from Tennessee said that abortion should be legal in all or most cases.

== History ==
=== Legislative history ===
The state was one of 10 states in 2007 to have a customary informed consent provision for abortions. In 2013, state Targeted Regulation of Abortion Providers (TRAP) had provisions related to admitting privileges and licensing. They required clinics have hospital privileges and transfer agreement with a hospital.

In 2015 Tennessee established a required 48 hour waiting period before obtaining an abortion.

The state legislature was one of eight states nationwide that tried, and failed, to pass a bill to ban early abortion in 2017. They tried again in 2018, where they were one of ten states that tried and failed to pass a fetal heartbeat bill. Two fetal heartbeat bills were filed in the Tennessee General Assembly in 2019. On January 23, 2019, Rep. James "Micah" Van Huss filed HB 77 in the Tennessee House of Representatives. On February 7, 2019, Sen. Mark Pody filed SB 1236 in the Tennessee Senate. On February 20, 2019, HB 77 was passed out of a Public Health subcommittee and sent to the full committee. On February 26, 2019, the House Public Health Committee voted 15–4 to send HB 77 to the House floor for a full vote. On February 7, 2019, HB 77 was passed out of the Tennessee House by a vote of 66–21. As of May 14, 2019, the state prohibited abortions after the fetus was viable, generally at some point between weeks 24 and 28. This period uses a standard defined by the US Supreme Court in 1973 with the Roe v. Wade ruling and was not a result of state-based legislation. In 2020 Tennessee banned abortions because of a prenatal diagnosis of Down syndrome or because of the gender or race of the fetus.

Due to the trigger law prohibiting abortion from the point of fertilization which was adopted on April 22, 2019, abortion became illegal from the point of conception in Tennessee on July 25, 2022, 30 days after the overturning of Roe v. Wade.

In 2026, a bill was proposed that would have sentenced women with the death penalty for homicide for having an abortion. The bill failed in the Tennessee legislature on March 10, 2026, following nationwide backlash.

=== Judicial history ===
The US Supreme Court's decision in 1973's Roe v. Wade ruling meant the state could no longer regulate abortion in the first trimester. (However, the Supreme Court overturned Roe v. Wade in Dobbs v. Jackson Women's Health Organization, No. 19-1392, 597 U.S. ___ (2022) later in 2022.)

Tennessee's heartbeat bill and the Texas-style abortion ban have been in court due to pro-abortion rights organizations suing the state of Tennessee.

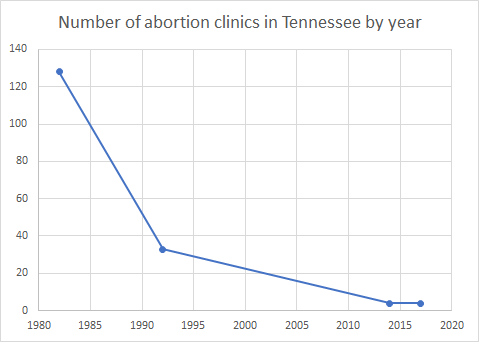
Number of abortion clinics in Tennessee by year

On September 12, 2023, three women filed a lawsuit against the state of Tennessee over the state's abortion ban, stating that they were denied abortions despite having dangerous pregnancy complications. On January 8, 2024, four additional women and two doctors joined the lawsuit.

In October 2024, a Tennessee court blocked enforcement of the abortion ban in certain emergencies, ruling that the medical emergency exception in Tennessee's abortion ban was unclear and violated a pregnant individual's right to life under the Tennessee state constitution. The preliminary order said that abortion must be allowed if a pregnant patient's water breaks too early, the cervix dilates before the fetus is viable, or if a fetus has a fatal diagnosis that threatens the pregnant patient's health. It barred the state from disciplining doctors who performed abortions under those circumstances.

=== Clinic history ===
==== Number and usage of clinics ====
Between 1982 and 1992, the number of abortion clinics in the state declined by 47, going from 128 in 1982 to 33 in 1992. In 2014, there were seven abortion clinics in the state. In 2014, 96% of the counties in the state did not have an abortion clinic. That year, 63% of women in the state aged 15–44 lived in a county without an abortion clinic. In 2017, there were four Planned Parenthood clinics, all of which offered abortion services, in a state with a population of 1,519,130 women aged 15–49.

==== Anti-abortion violence against clinics ====
Anti-abortion extremists are considered a domestic terrorist threat by the United States Department of Justice.

On January 22, 2021 — the 48th anniversary of Roe v Wade — a gunman fired a shotgun through the front doors of Knoxville's Planned Parenthood clinic, which was the only abortion provider in East Tennessee at that time. The gunman was not identified until nearly two years later, when federal court documents related to the January 6, 2021, insurrection at the U.S. Capitol Building named Mark Reno as the Knoxville Planned Parenthood gunman.

Less than one year later, on the morning of December 31, 2021, Knoxville's Planned Parenthood clinic was set on fire by an arsonist. The structure was in the midst of a renovation. Firefighters arrived to find that the single-story commercial building had a fire that reached through the roof. The fire, which was quickly put out, caused a "total loss" of the building, according to the Knoxville Fire Department (KFD). KFD and the federal Bureau of Alcohol, Tobacco, Firearms and Explosives (ATF) ruled the fire an arson. The arsonist was later revealed to be Mark Reno, who had shot through the clinic's front door less than a year prior. The clinic had to be rebuilt, which took years. Its absence left East Tennessee with no clinics providing abortion services.

=== Municipal actions ===
On July 13, 2022, the Memphis City council passed the Reproductive Autonomy is Necessary (RAIN) Act in an effort to lessen the extent to which statewide policy will affect childbearing women in Memphis.

=== Polling ===
In a 2014 poll by the Pew Research Center, 55% of adults in Tennessee said that abortion should be illegal in all or most cases and 40% said it should be legal. By 2022, support for legal abortion in the state had greatly increased.

Tennessean's views on the legality of abortion by political affiliation (2022)
Political affiliation	Legal in all cases	Legal only in special cases (Note: When the pregnancy was caused by rape, incest, or in cases where the mother's life is in danger.)	Illegal in all cases
Democratic	70%	22%	6%
Republican	8%	54%	33%
Independent	38%	46%	12%
Total	36%	44%	17%

== Abortion rights views and activities ==
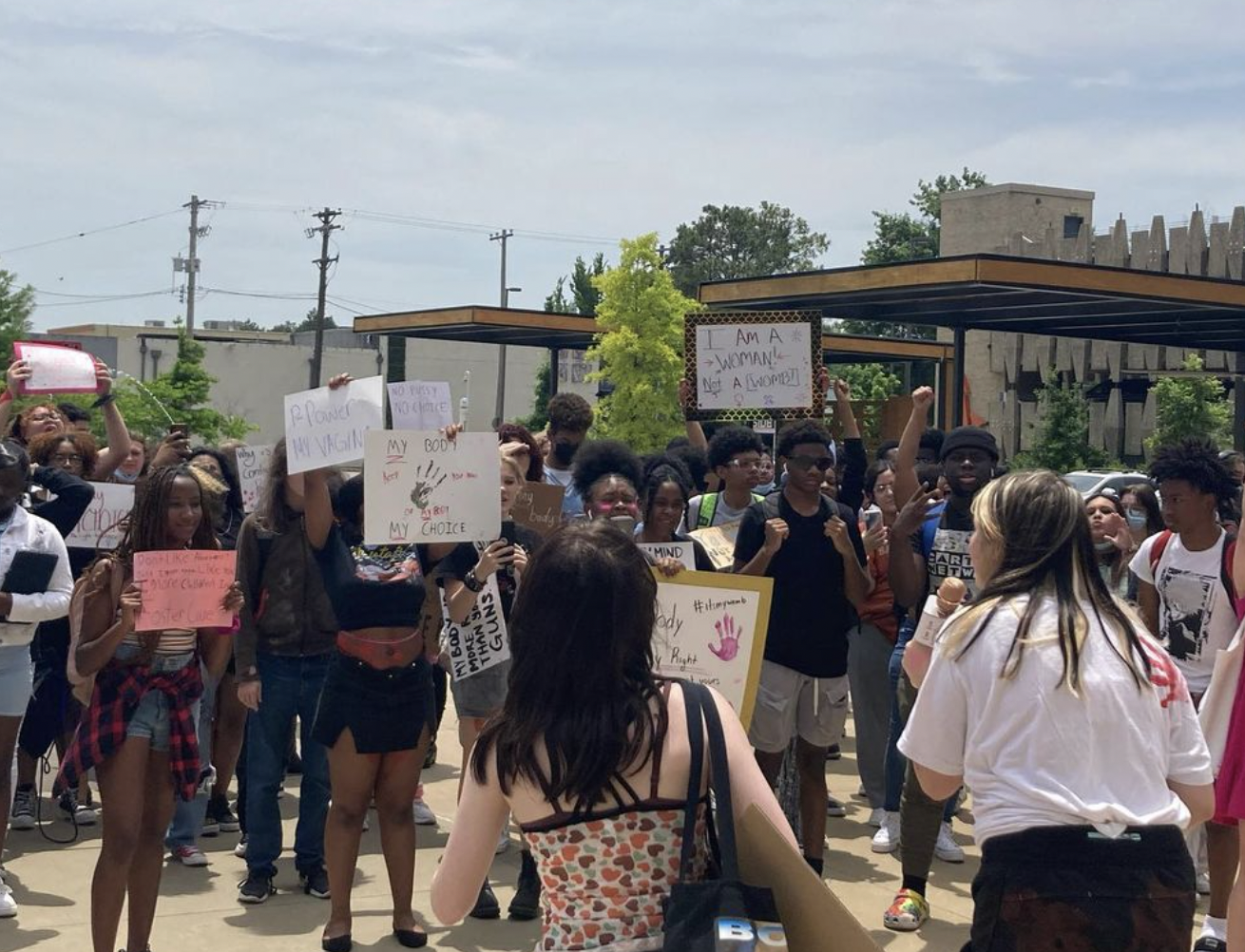
A pro-abortion rights protest in Memphis, shortly after the leaked Supreme Court opinion to overturn Roe v. Wade

=== Protests ===
Women from the state participated in marches supporting abortion rights as part of a #StoptheBans movement in May 2019.

In Memphis and Nashville, groups of people gathered to protest the abortion ban that would take place after the leaked draft opinion overturning Roe v. Wade. Many women shared their abortion stories at the protest.

In Nashville, Tennessee, hundreds gathered at the Legislative Plaza on June 24, 2022, following the overturn of Roe v. Wade. Protesters also gathered in Knoxville, along Poplar Avenue in Memphis, as well as Founder's Park in Johnson City.

On September 26, 2022, an abortion rights protester began walking across the entire state of Tennessee, a 538-mile walk, to protest the state Supreme Court's decision to overturn abortion rights.

In 2024, Allie Phillips ran for a Tennessee House seat in District 75 following being forced to leave the state to get an abortion in New York for a non-viable pregnancy.

== Anti-abortion views and activities ==
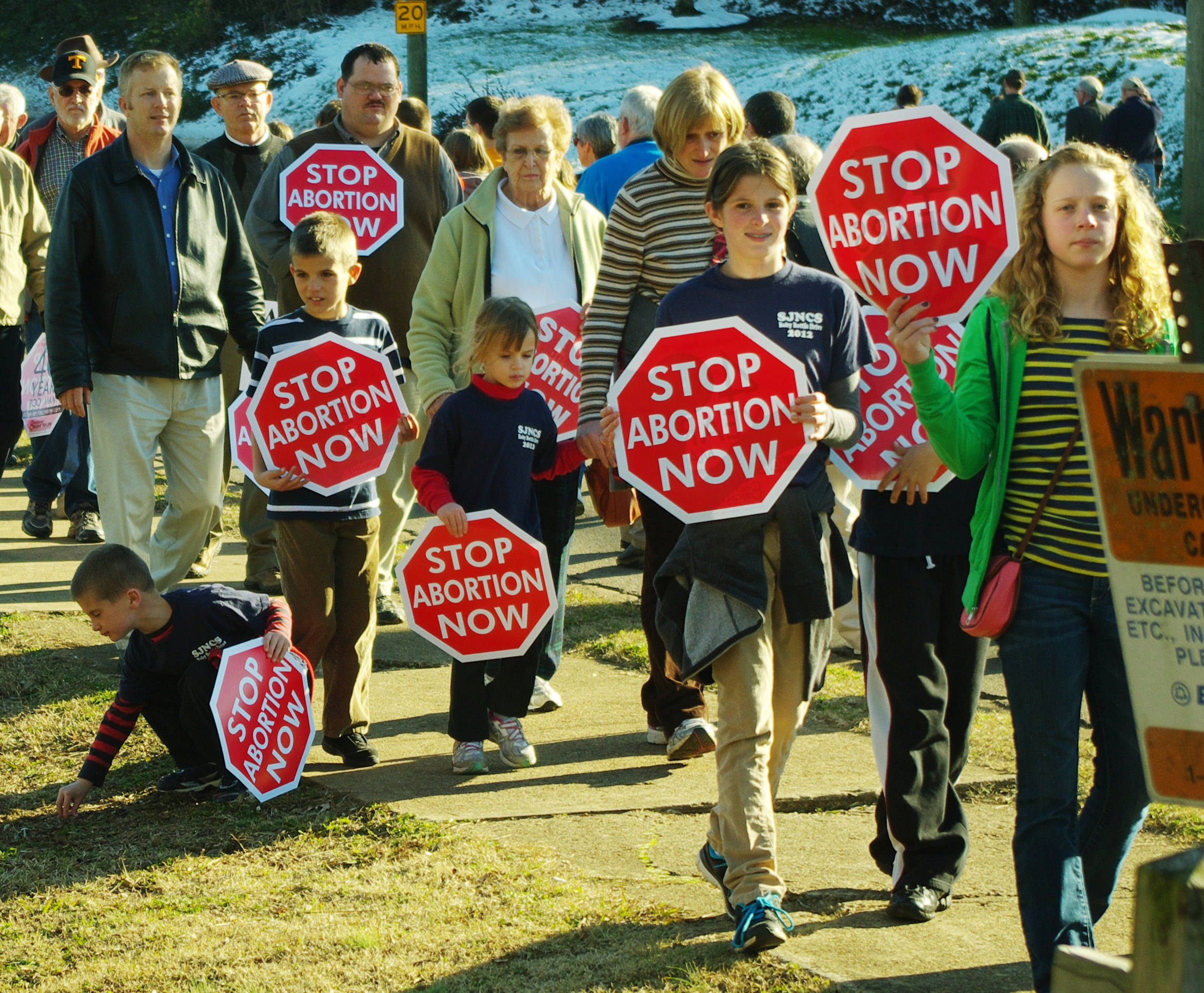
Participants and their children in the March for Life walk along Concord Avenue in Knoxville, Tennessee, United States. The march is held annually to mark the anniversary (January 22) of the U.S. Supreme Court decision, Roe v. Wade. The signs, designed to resemble stop signs, read, "Stop abortion now".

=== Protests ===
In 2020, thousands of people attended the March for Life in Knoxville supporting abortion bans and restrictions.

=== Violence ===
On January 23, 2021, a man fired a shotgun at a Planned Parenthood clinic in Knoxville; no one was injured. News outlets noted that the attack took place on the anniversary of the Roe v. Wade decision and at a time when Tennessee's governor, Bill Lee, was involved in a heated online debate regarding abortion and health care. On December 31, 2021, New Year's Eve, a fire destroyed the same Planned Parenthood in Knoxville. The building was closed at the time for renovations. The Knoxville Fire Department and Bureau of Alcohol, Tobacco, Firearms, and Explosives ruled the fire arson. In October 2022, federal court documents identified the arsonist as Mark Thomas Reno, who previously attacked the clinic in January and was present at the January 6 Capitol attack. Reno died on August 15, 2022.

On August 2, 2022, a Tennessee federal judge issued a restraining order against anti-abortion group Operation Save America after several of their members were arrested during protests at clinics in Nashville and Mt. Juliet in late July.

== Statistics ==
In the period between 1972 and 1974, there were zero recorded illegal abortion death in the state. In 1990, 554,000 women in the state faced the risk of an unintended pregnancy. In 2010, the state had no publicly funded abortions. In 2013, among white women aged 15–19, there were 690 abortions, 650 abortions for black women aged 15–19, 50 abortions for Hispanic women aged 15–19, and 20 abortions for women of all other races. In 2017, the state had an infant mortality rate of 7.4 deaths per 1,000 live births.

Number of reported abortions, abortion rate and percentage change in rate by geographic region and state in 1992, 1995 and 1996
Census division and state	Number			Rate			% change 1992–1996
Census division and state	1992	1995	1996	1992	1995	1996	% change 1992–1996
Total	1,528,930	1,363,690	1,365,730	25.9	22.9	22.9	–12
East South Central	54,060	44,010	46,100	14.9	12	12.5	–17
Alabama	17,450	14,580	15,150	18.2	15	15.6	–15
Kentucky	10,000	7,770	8,470	11.4	8.8	9.6	–16
Mississippi	7,550	3,420	4,490	12.4	5.5	7.2	–42
Tennessee	19,060	18,240	17,990	16.2	15.2	14.8	–8

Number, rate, and ratio of reported abortions, by reporting area of residence and occurrence and by percentage of abortions obtained by out-of-state residents, US CDC estimates
Location	Residence			Occurrence			% obtained by out-of-state residents	Year	Ref
Location	No.	Rate^	Ratio^^	No.	Rate^	Ratio^^	% obtained by out-of-state residents	Year	Ref
Tennessee	10,987	8.5	135	12,373	9.5	152	21.3	2014	
Tennessee	10,361	8	127	11,411	8.8	140	20.3	2015	
Tennessee	10,523	8.1	130	11,235	8.6	139	18.6	2016	
^number of abortions per 1,000 women aged 15–44; ^^number of abortions per 1,000 live births

According to Pew Research Center, in Tennessee, adults aged 30–49 are the age demographic that has the highest percentage of people thinking abortion should be legal in most cases (35%). According to the Lozier Institute, in 2019, 55% of Tennessee's abortions were at 8 weeks gestation or earlier, 23% were performed at between 9 and 10 weeks, 6% at 13 to 14 weeks, and 2% between 17 and 20 weeks. There were 26 cases of failed abortions with no complications, 17 with delayed or excessive hemorrhage, 15 with delayed or excessive hemorrhage after a failed abortion, and 17 cases that had unspecified complications.

== Criminal prosecutions of abortion ==
A 31-year-old Tennessean was charged with attempted first-degree murder in December 2015. The charge was based on an attempt to give herself an illegal abortion using a coat hanger.

== See also ==
- 2014 Tennessee Amendment 1
- Tennessee Monument to Unborn Children
