= Tennessee House of Representatives 75th district =

State legislative district in Tennessee

Tennessee's 75th State House of Representatives district
- Map of Tennessee House districts with the 75th District shaded in red
Representative
Michael Lankford; R–Palmyra
since 2025
- Demographics: 53.3% White; 20.9% Black; 13.7% Hispanic; 3.1% Asian; 0.2% Native American; 0.2% Hawaiian/Pacific Islander; 0.7% Other; 7.8% Multiracial
- Population (2024): 81,339

Tennessee House of Representatives District 75 is one of the 99 legislative districts in the Tennessee House of Representatives. The district covers the western portion of Montgomery County, Tennessee, including Fort Campbell and parts of Clarksville, Tennessee. The district is considered slightly to moderately competitive. In 2024, Donald Trump won the district with a margin of 12.6%.

== History ==
The 88th Tennessee General Assembly in 1972 was the first in which all districts were numbered. At this time, the district was in Gibson County. In 1982, at the time of the 93rd Tennessee GA, it was composed of Carroll, Henderson and Henry Counties. It was composed of Carroll and Henry Counties from the 94th to 97th Tennessee GA. At the time of the 98th GA, it was composed of Benton, Carroll and Henry Counties. From the 99th to the 102nd Tennessee GA, it was composed of Henry, Houston, Stewart and part of Dickson Counties. From redistricting in 2000 at the time of the 103rd GA to November 7, 2022, it was composed of Henry, Benton and Stewart Counties. Following redistricting, it has been western Montgomery County.

== Demographics ==
According to the Tennessee Comptroller, the 75th district had a population of approximately 81,339 as of 2024..

- 53.3% of the district is White
- 20.9% of the district is African-American
- 13.7% of the district is Hispanic
- 3.1% of the district is Asian
- 0.2% of the district is Native American
- 0.2% of the district is Pacific Islander
- 0.8% of the district is Other
- 7.8% of the district is Two or more races

Detailed demographic data is also available via Census Reporter.

== List of Representatives ==
*Following the death of Representative Jeff Burkhart on November 14, 2025, the Montgomery County Commission appointed Republican Michael Lankford to represent the district for the remainder of Burkhart's term. Lankford, a Clarksville resident and Montgomery County Commissioner, was selected on December 8, 2025, after a 9-9 tie vote between Lankford and Democratic nominee Allie Phillips, which was broken by County Mayor Wes Golden.

Representative	Party	Years of Service	General Assembly	Residence
Michael Lankford	Republican	Jan 13, 2026 - present	114th	Clarksville
Jeff Burkhart	Republican	Jan 10, 2023 - Nov 14, 2025 *	113th	Clarksville
Bruce Griffey	Republican	2019 - Aug 31, 2022	111th-112th	Paris
Tim Wirgau	Republican	2011-2019	107th-110th	Buchanan
Willie Borchert	Democratic	2003-2011	103rd-106th	Camden
L. Don Ridgeway	Democratic	1985-2003	94th-102nd	Paris
Dale R. Kelley	Republican	1983-1985	93rd	Huntingdon
C. Ray Davis	Democratic	1979-1983	91st-92nd	Milan
L. P. Fuqua	Democratic	1975-1979	89th-90th	Milan
Kenneth Crocker	Republican	1971 - 1975	87th, 88th	Trenton

== Elections ==
=== 2024 ===
2024 Tennessee House of Representatives District 75 Election
Party	Candidate	Votes	%
Republican	Jeff Burkhart (incumbent)	11,164	54.74%
Democratic	Allie Phillips	9,230	45.26%
Total votes		20,394	100.00%
Republican hold			

=== 2022 ===
2022 Tennessee House of Representatives District 75 general election
Party	Candidate	Votes	%
Republican	Jeff Burkhart	6,851	100.00 %
Total votes		6,851	100.00 %
Republican hold			

=== 2020 ===
2020 Tennessee House of Representatives District 75 general election
Party	Candidate	Votes	%
Republican	Bruce Griffey	20,140	81.32%
Independent	James Hart	4,626	18.68%
Total votes		24,766	100.00%
Republican hold			

=== 2018 ===
2018 Tennessee House of Representatives District 75 general election
Party	Candidate	Votes	%
Republican	Bruce Griffey	13,664	61.73%
Democratic	Richard Carl	7,449	33.65%
Independent	James Hart	1,023	4.62%
Total votes		22,136	100.00%
Republican hold			

=== 2016 ===
2016 Tennessee House of Representatives District 75 general election
Party	Candidate	Votes	%
Republican	Tim Wirgau	14,816	65.84%
Democratic	Daniel Powell	5,771	25.64%
Independent	James Hart	1,917	8.52%
Total votes		22,504	100.00%
Republican hold			

=== 2014 ===
2014 Tennessee House of Representatives District 75 general election
Party	Candidate	Votes	%
Republican	Tim Wirgau	8,719	62.19%
Democratic	Randy Patton	4,628	33.01%
Independent	James Hart	673	4.80%
Total votes		14,020	100.00%
Republican hold			

=== 2012 ===
2012 Tennessee House of Representatives District 75 general election
Party	Candidate	Votes	%
Republican	Tim Wirgau	13,065	56.33%
Democratic	Steve Wright	9,161	39.49%
Independent	James Hart	968	4.17%
Total votes		23,194	100.00%
Republican hold			

=== 2010 ===
2010 Tennessee House of Representatives District 75 general election
Party	Candidate	Votes	%
Republican	Tim Wirgau	10,122	56.72%
Democratic	Willie "Butch" Borchert	7,724	43.28%
Total votes		17,846	100.00%
Republican gain from Democratic			

=== 2008 ===
2008 Tennessee House of Representatives District 75 general election
Party	Candidate	Votes	%
Democratic	Willie "Butch" Borchert	11,647	50.75%
Republican	Tim Wirgau	11,303	49.25%
Total votes		22,950	100.00%
Democratic hold			

=== 2006 ===
2006 Tennessee House of Representatives District 75 general election
Party	Candidate	Votes	%
Democratic	Willie "Butch" Borchert	13,261	74.12%
Republican	Stephen R. Blackwell Sr.	4,631	25.88%
Total votes		17,892	100.00%
Democratic hold			

=== 2004 ===
2004 Tennessee House of Representatives District 75 general election
Party	Candidate	Votes	%
Democratic	Willie "Butch" Borchert	16,974	69.48%
Republican	Stephen R. Blackwell Sr.	7,454	30.52%
Total votes		24,428	100.00%
Democratic hold			

== See also ==
- Tennessee House of Representatives
- Montgomery County, Tennessee
