= Michael Lankford =

American politician (born 1995)

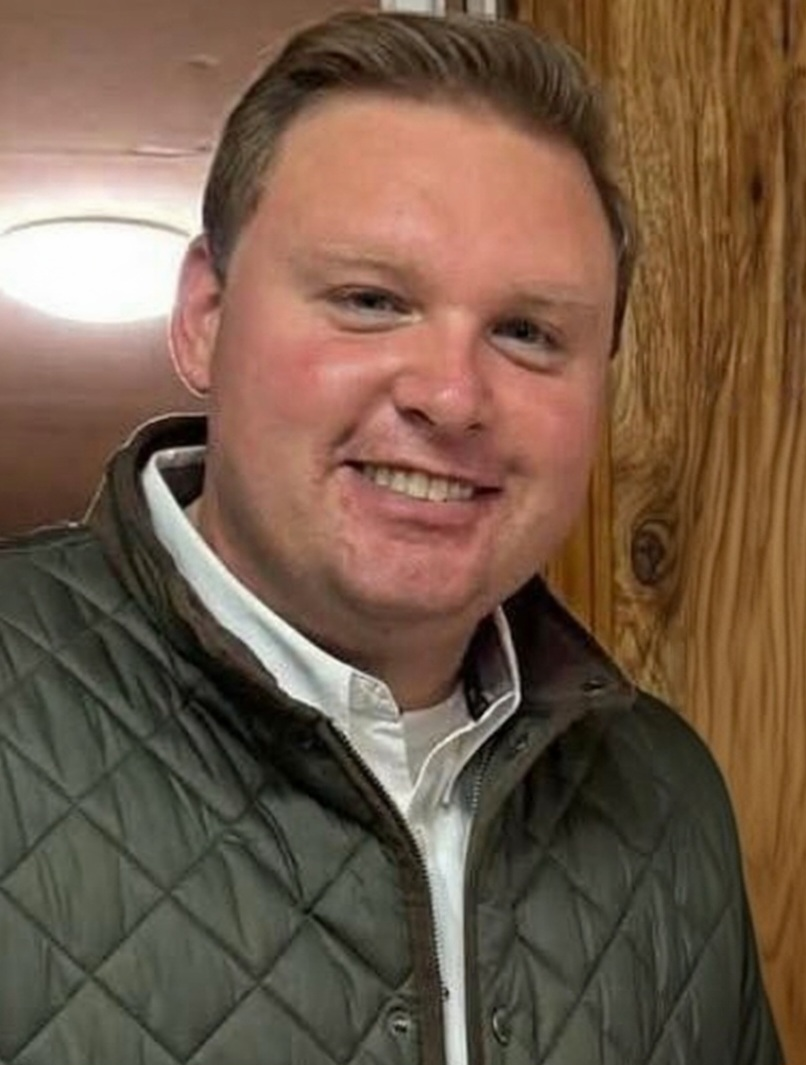
- Lankford in 2026

Member of the Tennessee House of Representatives from the 75th district
- Incumbent
- Assumed office January 13, 2026
- Preceded by: Jeff Burkhart

Personal details
- Born: April 16, 1995 (age 31)
- Party: Republican
- Education: Austin Peay State University (BS); University of Tennessee at Martin (MS)
- Website: House website

Michael Lankford (born April 16, 1995) is an American politician serving as a Republican member of the Tennessee House of Representatives for the 75th district since January 2026. He previously represented the 6th district in the Montgomery County Commission.

== Early life and education ==
Michael Lankford was born on April 16, 1995. He graduated from Clarksville High School in Clarksville, Tennessee. Later, he completed a BS in agriculture business from Austin Peay State University and a MS in agriculture business and risk management from the University of Tennessee at Martin.

== Tennessee House of Representatives (2026–present) ==
On November 14, 2025, state representative Jeff Burkhart died in office. Due to the resulting vacancy, the Montgomery County Commission became responsible for choosing who would serve the remainder of Burkhart's term. On December 8, Lankford, a Montgomery County Commissioner, was selected to complete the term after mayor Wes Golden broke the 9-9 tie between Lankford and Democratic contender Allie Phillips in Lankford's favor.

In 2026, Lankford and Phillips competed again, this time to serve a full term in the district. Phillips defeated Lankford in the general election with 55 percent of the district's votes.

== Personal life ==
Lankford lives in Palmyra, Tennessee, where he represented District 6 in the county commission prior to his appointment. He is a Baptist.

== Electoral history ==
=== County Commission ===
2022 Montgomery County Commission District 6 Republican primary election
Party	Candidate	Votes	%
Republican	Michael Lankford	540	99.26%
Write-in		4	0.74%
Total votes		544	100.00%

2022 Montgomery County Commission District 6 general election
Party	Candidate	Votes	%
Republican	Michael Lankford	578	52.03%
Independent	Randy Allbert (incumbent)	533	47.97%
Total votes		1,111	100.00%
