= Kamala Harris presidential campaign =

Kamala Harris presidential campaign may refer to:

- Kamala Harris 2020 presidential campaign, an unsuccessful primary campaign for the Democratic nomination that resulted in her being selected as Joe Biden's running mate and elected the 49th vice president of the United States
- Kamala Harris 2024 presidential campaign, an unsuccessful campaign for the presidency as the nominee of the Democratic party
