= Carl Nett =

American politician

Carl A. Nett

Member of the Kentucky House of Representatives from the 35th district
- In office January 1, 1970 – January 1, 1991
- Preceded by: Charles Vanover
- Succeeded by: Jim Wayne

Personal details
- Born: December 2, 1941 (age 84) Louisville, Kentucky, United States
- Party: Democratic

Carl Anthony Nett (born December 2, 1941) was an American politician in the state of Kentucky. He served in the Kentucky House of Representatives as a Democrat from 1970 to 1991. He was first elected to the house in 1969, defeating Republican incumbent Charles Vanover. In 1990 he lost renomination to Jim Wayne.

Nett's son, Carl Benjamin "Ben" Nett worked for the U.S. Secret Service and the CIA, then as a police officer in Purcellville, Virginia, in 2022, before joining its City Council, then being twice-appointed as vice mayor, in 2025 and 2026.
