= North Carolina Women's Right to Know Act =

The North Carolina Woman's Right to Know Act (House Bill 854 / S.L. 2011-405) is a passed North Carolina statute which is referred to as an "informed consent" law. The bill requires practitioners read a state-mandated informational materials, often referred to as counseling scripts, to patients at least 72 hours before the abortion procedure (the law originally required a 24-hour waiting period between counseling and their procedure). The patient and physician must certify that the information on informed consent has been provided before the procedure. The law also mandated the creation of a state-maintained website and printed informational materials, containing information about: public and private services available during pregnancy, anatomical and physiological characteristics of gestational development, and possible adverse effects of abortion and pregnancy. A review of twenty-three U.S. states informed consent materials found that North Carolina had the "highest level of inaccuracies," with 36 out of 78 statements rated as inaccurate, or 46%.

The law was passed and went into effect in October 2011. It was originally vetoed by Governor Bev Perdue but the veto was overridden by the General Assembly and became law on July 28, 2011. The stated intent for the bill was to create a "more stringent abortion law" and it has been faced with extensive criticism. Similar legislation, based on legislative models created and regularly updated by pro-life advocacy organizations, has been introduced and passed in at least eighteen other states, including: Texas, Georgia, South Carolina, Minnesota, and Oklahoma.

The bill originally contained a provision for real-time viewing of ultrasound images at least four hours before the abortion procedure. North Carolina was the third state to require that providers describe ultrasound images to patients and ensure the image was in their line of sight. This section of the bill was blocked by a federal court in 2014. The state of North Carolina appealed the ruling to the Supreme Court in the 2015 case Stuart v. Camnitz, but the Supreme Court declined to hear the case making this portion of the law unenforcible.

== History and Context ==
Abortion has historically been a very emotionally charged and divisive issue in the United States. The issue tends to be very partisan and is typically a topic of debate in most elections. States have attempted to control and regulate the practice in varying ways stopping just short of banning the practice. The constitutionality of banning the procedure was heard in the U.S Supreme Court in Roe v. Wade. It was decided that criminalizing the practice was in violation of a woman's right to privacy, under due process found in the Fourteenth Amendment However, the court decided that it was acceptable to make it illegal to have an abortion after the fetus is viable.

According to the North Carolina Department of Health and Human Services, in 2010 there were 30,952 abortions across the state. According to the Guttmacher Institute, abortion rates in the country have declined overall by 8% between 2000 and 2008. The Guttmacher Institute, which studies women's reproductive and sexual health, provided other statistics for abortions in the country during 2008 which is the most recent data available. "Women age 20-24 had the highest abortion rate of any age group, 39.9 per 1,000, followed by ages 18-19 at 34.7 per 1,000 and ages 25-29 at 28.6. The lowest rate was among women 40 and over, with 3.2 per 1,000. The abortion rate for teens ages 15-17 declined 22% from 14.6 to 11.3."

== North Carolina House Bill 854 ==
NC House Bill 854 is also known as "Women's Right to Know Act". The Bill states that it is "an act to require a twenty-four hour waiting period and the informed consent of a pregnant woman before an abortion may be performed". This provision was updated in 2015 with H.B. 465, and now includes a 72-hour waiting period. Section 90-21.82 is labeled "Informed consent to abortion" and it outlines the steps a physician must take 24 hours prior to performing an abortion. "At least 24 hours prior to the abortion, a physician or qualified professional has orally informed the woman, by telephone or in person of all of the following: the particular medical risks associated with the particular abortion procedure to be employed, including risks of infection, hemorrhage, cervical tear or uterine perforation, danger to subsequent pregnancies, including the ability to carry a child to full term, and any adverse psychological effects associated with the abortion."

The potential patient must also be informed of "the probable gestational age of the unborn child at the time the abortion is to be performed." The legislation also requires "that ultrasound imaging and heart tone monitoring that enable the pregnant woman to view her unborn child or listen to the heartbeat of the unborn child are available to the woman". It goes on to say, the physician must inform the pregnant woman "that medical assistance benefits may be available for prenatal care, childbirth, and neonatal care.". It is also the physicians responsibility to inform the patient that, "the father is liable to assist in the support of the child" and "the woman has other alternatives to abortion, including keeping the baby or placing the baby for adoption." The State is also required by the Bill to provide printed information and maintain a State website containing the following information: "geographically indexed materials designed to inform a woman of public and private agencies and services available to assist her through pregnancy, upon childbirth, and while child is dependent, including adoption agencies" and "materials designed to inform the woman of the probable anatomical and physiological characteristics of the unborn child at two-week gestational increments". The Bill outlines specifications to meet the ultrasound requirement in Section 90-21.85. The requirements to be met by the physician are as follows, "perform an obstetric ultrasound, provide a simultaneous explanation of what the ultrasound is depicting, the opportunity to hear the fetal heart tone, display the ultra sound images so that the pregnant woman may view them and obtain written certification that the requirements of the section have been complied with."

Section 90-21.85 also states, "Nothing in this section shall be construed to prevent a pregnant woman from averting her eyes from the ultrasound images required to be provided to and reviewed with her. Neither the physician nor the pregnant woman shall be subject to any penalty if she declines to look at the presented ultrasound images." Other sections in the Bill include, Procedure in case of a medical emergency, informed consent for a minor, reporting requirements, civil remedies, protection of privacy in court proceedings, assurance of informed consent and consent is freely given and severability." The ratified version of NC House Bill 854 changed the "ultrasound requirement" to the "Display of real-time view requirement"."

== Opposition ==
The passage of North Carolina House Bill 854 has faced a lot of opposition. Governor Perdue was among those who opposed the legislation, so much so she vetoed the Bill. The veto was then overridden by the State legislature. Governor Perdue said, "This bill is a dangerous intrusion into the confidential relationship that exists between women and their doctors. The bill contains provisions that are the most extreme in the nation in terms of interfering with that relationship. Physicians must be free to advise and treat their patients based on their medical knowledge and expertise and not have their advice overridden by elected officials seeking to impose their ideological agenda on others."

Planned Parenthood and the American Civil Liberties Union are among the opposing groups. Pro-choice groups against the legislation say that there are several aspects of the law that are not constitutional. First, the Supreme Court has ruled that restrictions on abortion are constitutional as long as they do not "place undue burden on a woman's right to the procedure". Opponents claim that the 24-hour waiting period could cause undue burden on women, especially those who live in rural areas. "If there is enough evidence that the law causes such difficulty, especially delays in care — abortions are safer the earlier they are performed — the court could side against the state, said Maya Manian, a women's issues law professor at the University of San Francisco".

Secondly, groups opposing the law claim that it is a violation of First Amendment rights to free speech. U.S. District Court Judge Catherine Eagles ordered a preliminary injunction against the ultrasound requirement as she believes it could prove to violate First Amendment rights to free speech. "The First Amendment prohibits government directives on "both what to say and what not to say," she wrote". Eagles also stated, "the U.S. Supreme Court has struck down statutes that require students to recite the Pledge of Allegiance and salute the flag, or compel people to display state mottoes on license plates". "She said the North Carolina abortion law "goes well beyond" requirements that patients give informed consent to medical procedures. The ultrasound provision could compel "an unwilling speaker to deliver visual and spoken messages to a listener who is not listening or looking," the judge wrote".". Aside from constitutional violations, groups against the law claim that it is simply a means of enforcing or advancing the ideologies of law makers."(The North Carolina law) turns doctors into mouthpieces for politicians' ideological message," said Bebe Anderson who is senior counsel for the Center for Reproductive Rights, another group which filed suit against the State over the constitutionality of NC Right to Know Act.".

The groups opposing the restrictions also point to the fact that other states have struck down similar laws. "Courts in Texas and Oklahoma have "already blocked enforcement of these kinds of ultrasound requirements because they radically intrude on women's private lives and violate basic constitutional rights," said Bebe Anderson". Another possible outcome of the legislation is an increase in the cost of service. ""The cost to the patient would go up, but we're trying to figure out how to implement this at the lowest possible cost to our patients and still be as accessible as possible," said Janet Colm, the chief executive officer at Planned Parenthood Central North Carolina."

== Support ==
Although many have voiced their opposition to the law, there are also many who are in favor of such a regulation. It is clear through the veto override that NC legislators are, for the most part, in favor of the "Right to Know Act". "The state's Republican-led General Assembly passed the law this summer, overriding a veto by Democratic Governor Perdue. North Carolina is the third state to approve a law requiring that a woman be shown an ultrasound before her abortion". "Barbara Holt, president of North Carolina Right to Life and a supporter of the new law, said the ultrasound requirement will help women make fully informed decisions."The ultrasound is a window into the womb and the opportunity for this mother to get scientifically accurate information about a procedure that is going to have great consequences for her and her child. It's a life or death decision," Holt said.

Supporters claim the law is an attempt to ensure that women are making informed decisions. "Rep. Nelson Dollar, R-Wake, said the goal of the law is to reduce the number of abortions in North Carolina by ensuring women have as much information as possible about fetal development and alternatives to ending their pregnancies". Those in favor of the stipulations in the law claim that women are not necessarily receiving information about their pregnancy and resources at their disposal"". Barbara Holt compared the law with other regulations forcing one to listen to information regarding health and safety. "Holt said the required presentation is similar to what commercial air travelers are told before a flight about possible problems and safety procedures. "You may have heard it a thousand times, but they are still required to say it and you need to know it," she said".

Another argument proposed by those supporting the law is protecting women from "emotional trauma" and will ultimately "promote childbirth". Supporters of the law are confident in its constitutionality and believe that legislatures are simply representing. "But N.C. Rep. Paul Stam, R- Wake, the House majority leader, said the law is constitutional and supported by a majority of the state, according to a poll taken by Civitas Institute, a conservative think tank. "This is not a change in the people; this is a change in the leadership," he said".

== Other examples ==
"An Oklahoma County judge has permanently blocked a state law that requires women seeking abortions to have an ultrasound and listen to a detailed description of the fetus before prior to the abortion. District Judge Brian Dixon handed down an order ruling that the law is unconstitutional and unenforceable. The order says the statute passed in 2010 is an unconstitutional special law because it addresses only patients and physicians concerning abortions and not other medical care. Enforcement of the law has been blocked since shortly after Nova Health Systems, operator of Reproductive Services of Tulsa, challenged its constitutionality in May 2010. It would have forced a woman seeking an abortion to undergo an ultrasound, have the image placed in front of her and then hear it described in detail".

Wisconsin has recently passed a similarly restrictive law entitled "The Coercive and Web Cam Abortion Prevention Act". "The law, which took effect on Friday, requires women visit a doctor at least three times before having a drug-induced abortion, forces physicians to determine whether women are being coerced into having an abortion and prohibits women and doctors from using web cams during the procedure". "The Wisconsin law is the latest in a number of anti-abortion measures pressed by conservative lawmakers in the nation." Other examples of legislation aimed at restricting abortion rights have occurred in Mississippi and Arizona.

Mississippi Governor Phil Bryant signed a law that may force the state's only abortion clinic out of business, and earlier this month Arizona Governor Jan Brewer signed a controversial measure banning most abortions after 20 weeks of pregnancy. In Arizona, "The Republican-controlled House of Representatives passed a bill to prohibit abortions after the 18th week of pregnancy; a bill to protect doctors from being sued if they withhold health information about a pregnancy that could cause a woman to seek an abortion; and a bill to mandate that how school curriculums address the topic of unwanted pregnancies." The bills have not been signed by Gov. Brewer but she has been a longtime advocate against abortion rights. Mississippi has recently enacted a law which puts more stringent requirements on physicians who wish to become licensed to perform abortions in the state. "The law, signed by Gov. Phil Bryant, requires doctors performing abortions to have admitting privileges at a local hospital and to be board-certified in obstetrics and gynecology or be eligible to be certified, meaning the physician has completed training in the specialty."

There has been an effort to define when life begins by some states and Mississippi is one example. Last Fall, Gov. Bryant attempted to amend the language in the State Constitution defining life as beginning when an egg is fertilized. 58% of voters in Mississippi voted against the amendment. "The "personhood" proposal would have granted legal protections to fetuses, limited the use of some birth control and limited abortions." Some are more stringent than others. "Ohio lawmakers are considering a bill that would largely ban abortion when a fetal heartbeat can be heard, which can be as early as six weeks."." These states are examples of an ever increasing trend to, what some may call, limit women's reproductive rights. "In 2011, states passed 92 provisions that imposed limits on abortion, according to the Guttmacher Institute, a nonprofit group that supports abortion rights, but produces data that are cited by groups on both sides of the debate. That was the most the group had seen in a year since it began tracking bills in the early 1970s; the highest previous total was 34."
