= Owensboro Health =

Coordinates: 37.7794°N 87.0636°W

- Type: Private (not-for-profit)
- Industry: Health care
- Founded: 1941
- Headquarters: Owensboro, Kentucky
- Area served: Kentucky, Indiana
- Key people: CEO and President; Mark Marsh
- Services: Tertiary Level Clinical Care; Rehabilitation; Cancer Center; Community Medical Facilities; Long-term Care; Research; Primary Care
- Number of employees: 4,300
- Website: owensborohealth.org

Owensboro Health is the health system in Owensboro, Kentucky. It was originally known as "Owensboro Daviess County Hospital" until it merged with the nearby and much smaller Mercy Hospital in 1995. The hospital was renamed "Owensboro Mercy Health System" until 2003 when it changed its name to "Owensboro Medical Health System". A new hospital, again renamed as simply "Owensboro Health Regional Hospital" opened at the northeast outskirts of Owensboro, in 2013.

Owensboro Health reaches an 18-county area, serving nearly 300,000 in Western Kentucky and Southern Indiana. With a centrally located hospital housing more than 40 specialties, four outpatient Healthplex locations and the Healthpark, a 110,000-square foot medical-based health and fitness center. Read more about OH facilities.

== Owensboro Health Regional Hospital ==
The 477 patient bed facility began construction in 2010, and opened to the public on June 1, 2013.

The hospital uses water, land and other natural resources sustainably. OHRH was the first hospital in the world to achieve the Audubon International Signature Program designation, which helps developers preserve natural resources.

The nine-story hospital was designed to include as many windows as possible. Floor-to-ceiling windows in patient rooms let in the sunlight that reinforces your natural body clock and helps you follow a healthy sleep-wake cycle which promotes healing.

== Owensboro Health Muhlenberg Community Hospital ==
On May 1, 2014, Muhlenberg Community Hospital opened a new chapter in its rich history by entering into a management agreement with Owensboro Health. Under the current agreement, Owensboro Health provided operational and financial oversight of the hospital, and the arrangement led to significant gains in revenue and patient volume in 2014.

Announced March 19, 2015, a new agreement between Muhlenberg Community Hospital and Owensboro Health brings the MCH campus and its employees into the Owensboro Health system.

== Owensboro Health Medical Group ==
Owensboro Health Medical Group is a network within Owensboro Health. It includes over 200 providers that practice at more than 25 locations.

On June 28, 2016, OHMG hosted groundbreakings to the construction of three outpatient Healthplex facilities in Henderson, Madisonville and Muhlenberg County.

== Mitchell Memorial Cancer Center ==
In July 2005, Owensboro Health opened the Mitchell Memorial Cancer Center.

Owensboro Health is accredited as a Community Comprehensive Cancer Center, the highest endorsement awarded to any community hospital from the Commission on Cancer of the American College of Surgeons.

== Healthpark ==
The Healthpark is a 115,000-square foot medical-based health and fitness center. It includes a gymnasium, competition-size pool, indoor track and fitness equipment.

== Education ==
OH partners with the University of Louisville to provide the Family Medicine Residency program. Accredited in May 2019, the residency will welcome its first six residents in 2020. The three-year program will add an additional six physicians each year for a total of 18 residents.

New nursing graduates may participate in the nurse residency program which provides six weekly training sessions with peers.
