= Abortion law in the United States by state =

Status of elective abortion in the United States Illegal, limited exceptions (Note: All states and territories, apart from the Northern Mariana Islands, allow abortion to prevent the woman's imminent death (with various definitions of "imminent"), and some for other reasons. Northern Mariana Islands allows exceptions per law, but no law has been passed. • Additional allowance for risk to the woman's physical health: Alabama, Arizona, Florida, Georgia, Indiana, Iowa, Kansas, Kentucky, Louisiana, Missouri, Montana, Nebraska, New Hampshire, North Carolina, North Dakota, Ohio, Pennsylvania, South Carolina, Tennessee, Utah, West Virginia, Wisconsin, and Wyoming. • Allowance for risk to the woman's general health: California, Connecticut, Delaware, Hawaii, Indiana, Illinois, Maine, Maryland, Massachusetts, Michigan, Minnesota, Nevada, New York, Rhode Island, Virginia, Washington. • Allowance for pregnancy due to rape or incest: Georgia, Idaho, Indiana, Iowa, Mississippi, North Dakota, South Carolina, West Virginia, Utah, and Wyoming. • Allowance for lethal fetal abnormality: Alabama, Delaware, Florida, Georgia, Indiana, Iowa, Louisiana, Maryland, Massachusetts, South Carolina, West Virginia, Wyoming, and Utah. Note that these allowances may have a time limit, which may be as early as cardiac-cell activity (approximately 6 weeks LMP); others may have no limit. Different allowances may have different limits in the same state.) Legal, but no providers Legal before cardiac-cell activity (Note: Cardiac-cell activity is generally detectable in the 6th week LMP. Allowance beyond this limit is made, at minimum, for an immediate threat to the woman's life. In general, states that permit limited elective abortion may allow abortion beyond that limit for some or all of the reasons listed above.) Legal through 12th week LMP* Legal through 18th week LMP* Legal through 22nd week LMP* (5 months) Legal before fetal viability (Note: Typically, fetal viability begins in the 23rd or 24th week LMP.) Legal through 24th week LMP* (5½ months) Legal through second trimester (Note: The second trimester is variously defined as through 27th or 28th week LMP.) Legal at any stage *LMP is the time elapsed since the last menstruation began. This color-coded map illustrates the current legal status of elective-specific abortion procedures in each of the individual states, U.S. territories, and federal district. State supreme courts and other high courts may mandate that abortions either are able or are not able to be performed, even if law allows or does not allow it. A colored border indicates a more stringent restriction or ban that is blocked by legal injunction.

The legality of abortion in the United States and the restrictions imposed on the procedure vary significantly among the states or other jurisdictions. There is no uniform federal law. Some states prohibit abortion at any stage of pregnancy with few exceptions, others permit it up to a certain point in pregnancy, and some allow abortion throughout a pregnancy. In states where abortion is legal, several classes of restrictions on the procedure may exist, such as parental consent or notification, requirements that patients be shown an ultrasound before obtaining an abortion, mandatory waiting periods, and counseling requirements.

From 1973 to 2022, Supreme Court rulings in Roe v. Wade (1973) and Planned Parenthood v. Casey (1992) established federal protection for a pregnant woman's right to get an abortion, ensuring that states could not ban abortion prior to the point at which a fetus may be deemed viable. However, Roe and Casey were overturned by Dobbs v. Jackson Women's Health Organization (2022), and states may since impose any regulation on abortion, provided it satisfies rational basis review and does not otherwise conflict with federal law. Prior to the Court's decision in Dobbs, many states enacted trigger laws to ban abortion, should Roe be overturned. Additionally, several states either have enacted or are in the process of enacting stricter abortion laws following Dobbs, and some have resumed enforcement of laws in effect prior to 1973. While such laws are no longer considered to violate the United States Constitution, they continue to face legal challenges in state courts.

== Legal history ==
Abortion laws in the US prior to Roe. Illegal Legal in case of rape Legal in case of danger to woman's life Legal in cases of danger to woman's health Legal in case of danger to woman's health, rape or incest, or likely damaged fetus Legal on request

Parental notification and consent laws in the US Parental notification or consent not required One parent must be informed beforehand^{1} Both parents must be informed beforehand One parent must consent beforehand^{2} Both parents must consent beforehand One parent must consent and be informed beforehand Parental notification law currently enjoined Parental consent law currently enjoined^{1} Delaware's parental notification law only applies to minors under the age of 16.^{2} Illinois's parental notification law was repealed June 1, 2022.^{3} Massachusetts' parental consent law only applies to minors under the age of 16. South Carolina's law only apples to minors under 17.

Mandatory waiting period laws in the US No mandatory waiting period. Waiting period of 24 hours. Waiting period of 72 hours. No elective abortion.

Fetal homicide laws in the fifty states in 2018. Also applies to certain offenses which the United States government has jurisdiction. Homicide or murder. Other crime against fetus. Depends on age of fetus. Assaulting mother. No law on feticide.

Abortion counseling laws in the US No mandatory counseling Counseling in person, by phone, mail, and/or other Counseling in person only Counseling law enjoined

Mandatory ultrasound laws in the US Mandatory. Must display image. Mandatory. Must offer to display image. Mandatory. Law unenforceable. Not mandatory. If ultrasound is performed, must offer to display image. Not mandatory. Must offer ultrasound. Not mandatory.

Individual states have broad discretion to prohibit or regulate abortion. As a result, the legal status of abortion varies considerably from state to state. The Supreme Court removed this discretion and asserted the existence of a federal right to abortion in its 1973 Roe v. Wade decision; however, this ruling was overturned 49 years later by the Court's ruling in Dobbs v. Jackson Women's Health Organization (2022).

The key deliberated article of the US Constitution is the Due Process Clause of the Fourteenth Amendment, which states that:

...[N]or shall any State deprive any person of life, liberty, or property, without due process of law...

— U.S. Const., amend. XIV, § 1, cl. 3

A number of states limit abortions to a maximum number of weeks into pregnancy, usually prior to when the fetus could survive if removed from the womb. For comparative purposes, the youngest child thought to have survived a premature birth in the United States was Curtis Means born on July 5, 2020, in Birmingham, Alabama, at a gestational age of 21 weeks and one day.

Moreover, due to the Hyde Amendment, many state health programs which poor women rely on for their health care do not cover abortions; according to the ACLU, only 17 states – including California, Illinois, and New York – offer, or require, such coverage, as of 2023.

== Current legal status of abortion by state, territory, or district ==
States with trigger laws or pre-Roe bans on abortion that made abortion illegal in the state following Roe v. Wade being overturned. Trigger laws Trigger laws and pre-Roe laws Pre-Roe laws

In the aftermath of the Dobbs ruling, state legislation and court rulings determine most aspects of abortion access in the United States. The following sections outline the current status of abortion law in the various states and territories; references to weeks refer to the number of weeks since the pregnant woman's last menstrual period, or LMP, which is typically used as a measure of how long they have been pregnant.

=== Alabama ===
Alabama enforces one of the toughest abortion bans in the country.Abortion is illegal in Alabama, with exceptions to preserve the woman's life or physical health, or in the case of fatal fetal abnormalities. There are no exceptions for rape or incest.

Performing an abortion is a Class A felony, with up to 99 years in prison, and attempted abortion is a Class C felony, punishable by 1 to 10 years in prison, under a law enacted in May 2019.

Alabama Attorney General Steve Marshall stated that Alabama law would allow the state to prosecute those who helped organize or finance trips by Alabamians to other states, in order to receive abortions, even if abortions were legal in those states. In July 2023, two abortion advocacy groups filed lawsuits seeking to prevent such prosecutions, and in March 2025 the suits were concluded when a federal judge determined that such prosecutions would indeed be unconstitutional.

=== Alaska ===
Abortion is legal in Alaska at all stages of pregnancy.

Alaska does not require a minor to notify a parent or guardian in order to obtain an abortion. In September 2024, an Alaska superior court judge struck down the requirement that only licensed physicians provide abortions, meaning that the procedure can now also be legally performed by nurse practitioners and physician assistants.

Alaska state Medicaid covers abortions in most cases.

=== American Samoa ===
Abortion is illegal in American Samoa, with limited exceptions to preserve the life or health of the mother, and was effectively illegal there before Roe v. Wade was overturned.

=== Arizona ===
Abortion in Arizona is legal until the point of fetal viability, a right enshrined in the state constitution by voters in 2024. A licensed physician must perform the procedure. Minors under the age of 18 must receive parental consent.

A total abortion ban was enacted by the Arizona Territory legislature in 1864 that was invalidated by Roe. A 15-week ban trigger law was enacted in Arizona in 2022. After the Dobbs decision was handed down later that year, there was confusion over which of the two laws should go into effect: Then-Governor Doug Ducey backed the 15-week ban, while then-Attorney General Mark Brnovich held that the older total ban should be operative. A December 2022 state appeals court ruling found that the 2022 law should take precedence, but on April 9, 2024, the Republican-controlled Arizona Supreme Court ruled in Planned Parenthood Arizona v. Mayes that the 1864 law could be enforced. However, on May 1, the Arizona Legislature repealed the 1864 law, leaving the 15-week ban in place. Legal maneuvering ensured that the legislature's repeal of the 1864 law would go into effect before the Supreme Court's removal of the injunction against it.

Governor of Arizona Katie Hobbs and state Attorney General Kris Mayes are both supporters of abortion rights, elected in 2022 as part of a nationwide backlash to the Dobbs decision. In July 2023, Hobbs issued an executive order stripping local prosecutors of their ability to file prosecutions over the 15-week ban, or (if it had been revived in court) the 1864 ban, and assigning that power to Mayes, who, in turn, stated that she had no intention of ever filing such prosecutions.

Proposition 139 was approved on the November 2024 ballot, establishing a right to abortion in the Constitution of Arizona up until fetal viability. This made the debate over the blanket bans moot, and opened up legal action over existing laws that had regulated abortion before the bans had gone into effect. For instance, in 2026 a Maricopa County judge ruled that the language of the amendment voided bans on telemedicine prescription of abortion medication, and requirements that patients have multiple consultations with a doctor before undergoing an abortion procedure.

Arizona state Medicaid covers abortion if the life of the mother is endangered, or in the cases of rape and incest, per federal standards.

=== Arkansas ===
Abortion is illegal in Arkansas, with an exception for abortions necessary to save the life of the pregnant woman; there are no exceptions for rape, incest, or fatal fetal abnormalities.

Doctors determined to have performed an abortion face up to 10 years in prison, and fines up to $100,000.

=== California ===
Abortion is legal in California up to the point of fetal viability, or after that if necessary to preserve the life or health (including mental health) of the pregnant woman.

Nurse-midwives and other non-physician qualified medical personnel with proper training may perform abortion procedures early in pregnancy. California does not require a minor to notify a parent or guardian in order to obtain an abortion. In November 2022, California voters approved Proposition 1, enshrining women's reproductive rights, including the right to legal abortion and contraception, in the state constitution.

California state Medicaid covers abortions in most cases.

=== Colorado ===
Abortion is legal in Colorado at all stages of pregnancy. Minors' parents or legal guardians must receive notice before the procedure.

In 2008, Kristine and Michael Burton of Colorado for Equal Rights proposed Colorado Amendment 48, an initiative to amend the definition of a person to "any human being from the moment of fertilization". On November 4, 2008, the initiative was turned down by 73.2 percent of the voters.

The Colorado General Assembly enacted the Reproductive Health Equity Act into law in April 2022, which protects abortion rights, and assures "every individual has a fundamental right to make decisions about the individual's reproductive health care, including the fundamental right to use or refuse contraception; a pregnant individual has a fundamental right to continue a pregnancy and give birth, or to have an abortion, and to make decisions about how to exercise that right; and a fertilized egg, embryo, or fetus does not have independent or derivative rights under the laws of the state".

2024 Colorado Amendment 79 appeared on the ballot in November 2024. The amendment was approved by voters, explicitly conferring the right to abortion in the Colorado state constitution.

In 2023, Colorado passed SB23-189 which (among other things) requires private insurance to cover abortion, with some exceptions. Colorado state Medicaid covers abortions in most cases as well.

=== Connecticut ===
Abortion is legal in Connecticut up to the point of fetal viability, or after that if necessary to preserve the life or health (including mental health) of the pregnant woman. Connecticut does not require a minor to notify a parent or guardian in order to obtain an abortion.

The 1821 abortion law of Connecticut was the first known law enacted in the United States to restrict abortion. Although this law did not completely outlaw abortions, it imposed heavier restrictions, as it prevented people from attempting or receiving abortions, which was generally through the consumption of poison, during the first four months of a pregnancy.

Connecticut state Medicaid covers abortions in most cases.

=== Delaware ===
Abortion is legal in Delaware up to the point of fetal viability. Parental notification is required for minors under the age of 16.

55% of adults said in a poll by the Pew Research Center that abortion should be legal in all or most cases. There were therapeutic exceptions in the state's legislative ban on abortions by 1900. Informed consent laws were on the books by 2007. As of May 14, 2019, the state prohibited abortions after the fetus was viable, generally some point between week 24 and 26. This period uses a standard defined by the United States Supreme Court in 1973 with the Roe v. Wade ruling.

Starting January 1st, 2025, Delaware requires private insurance to cover abortion, with some exceptions. Delaware state Medicaid covers abortions in most cases as well.

=== District of Columbia ===
Abortion is legal in the District of Columbia at all stages of pregnancy. The District of Columbia does not require a minor to notify a parent or guardian in order to obtain an abortion.

A previous statute making abortion a criminal offense in the District was repealed in 2004. The consequence of this repeal is that abortion is completely unregulated in the District throughout the period of pregnancy.

Per the Dornan Amendment passed by congress in 1989 District of Colombia Medicaid covers abortion only if the life of the mother is endangered, or in the cases of rape and incest, in accordance with federal standards.

=== Florida ===
Abortion is illegal after 6 weeks in Florida, with exceptions for rape, incest, and human trafficking (up to 15 weeks), fetal abnormalities (before the third trimester), and, throughout pregnancy, if the pregnant woman's life is in danger. Parental consent is required for minors under the age of 18.

Until 2022, abortion in Florida was legal up to the 24th week of pregnancy. 56% of adults said in a poll by the Pew Research Center that abortion should be legal in all or most cases. An abortion ban with therapeutic exception was in place by 1900. Such laws were in place after the American Medical Association sought to criminalize abortion in 1857. By 2007, the state had a customary informed consent provision for abortions. By 2013, state Targeted Regulation of Abortion Providers (TRAP) law applied to medication induced abortions. Attempts to ban abortion took place in 2011, 2012, 2013, 2014, 2015, and 2016.

There is a privacy clause in the Constitution of Florida, and the Supreme Court of Florida had in 1989 ruled that it protected a right to abortion in the state. The Florida Legislature outlawed abortion after 15 weeks in 2022, and the court declined to stay that law as challenges to it made their way through the Florida legal system. In 2023, the Florida Legislature enacted a "heartbeat bill" banning abortion at 6 weeks, but the law had a trigger provision, preventing it from going into effect unless the Florida Supreme Court first ruled in favor of the 15-week ban. The Court did so on April 1, 2024, and the 6-week ban took effect on May 1, 2024.

On April 1, 2024, the Court approved Amendment 4, an initiative that appeared on the 2024 ballot that, if ratified, would have allowed abortion up to the point of fetal viability. The amendment failed to reach the 60% threshold needed to pass, garnering 57% of the vote.

=== Georgia ===
Abortion is illegal in Georgia after 5 or 6 weeks from LMP (on average, 1 to 2 weeks after a missed period), not counting a 24-hour waiting period. Parental notification is required for minors under the age of 18.

The Georgia Legislature enacted an abortion law in 2019 that prohibits abortions after a fetal heartbeat is detected, usually six weeks following the last menstrual period. Enforcement of the law was blocked by a federal judge in that year, but it was reinstated after the Dobbs ruling.

A court challenge was filed based on the premise that the law violated the United States Constitution when it was enacted because it was enacted before Dobbs; this was rejected by the Supreme Court of Georgia in 2023, but the court sent the case back to a lower court to determine whether the law violated the Constitution of Georgia. On September 30, 2024, Fulton County Superior Judge Robert McBurney issued a ruling finding that the state constitution protects a right to privacy, and that access to abortion before fetal viability is part of that right. The ruling struck down the law, though a spokesperson for the Attorney General of Georgia said the state would appeal; one week later, the 6-week abortion ban was provisionally restored by the Georgia Supreme Court, pending the resolution of the appeal.

=== Guam ===
Abortion services are currently unavailable in Guam because there are no local clinicians who provide them.

Abortion is legal in Guam up to 13 weeks; up to 26 weeks in cases of rape, incest, or if "the child would be born with a grave physical or mental defect"; or at any time if a physician can demonstrate "substantial risk that continuance of the pregnancy would endanger the life of the mother, or would gravely impair the physical or mental health of the mother".

However, there have been no physicians based in Guam who have provided abortions since the last provider retired in 2016. In January 2021, a court injunction blocked a law that required an in-person consultation before an abortion, which allowed doctors licensed to practice in Guam, but resident elsewhere, to prescribe abortion pills to Guam residents via telemedicine; two doctors in Hawaii did so, but an appeals court lifted the injunction in August 2023.

A 1990 law that would ban nearly all abortions is blocked by federal courts. Attorney General of Guam Douglas Moylan is currently appealing this injunction. The Legislature of Guam passed a six-week ban in 2022 that was vetoed by Governor Lou Leon Guerrero.

=== Hawaii ===
Abortion is legal in Hawaii up to the point of fetal viability, or after that if necessary to preserve the life or health of the pregnant woman. Hawaii does not require a minor to notify a parent or guardian in order to obtain an abortion.

As of 2017, there are 28 clinics in Hawaii that will perform abortions. After viability, an abortion is only allowed if the patient's life or health is in danger. In 2025, Hawaii legislators proposed a constitutional amendment to enshrine abortion and contraception rights within Hawaii's state constitution.

=== Idaho ===
Abortion is illegal in Idaho, with exceptions for rape, incest, and to save the pregnant woman's life; there are no exceptions for fatal fetal abnormalities.

=== Illinois ===
Abortion is legal in Illinois up to the point of fetal viability, or after that if necessary to preserve the life or health (including mental health) of the pregnant woman. Illinois does not require a minor to notify a parent or guardian in order to obtain an abortion.

In 2013, the Illinois Supreme Court recognized a right to abortion in the Illinois state constitution under the due process clause. As of 2017, Illinois had 40 facilities that can perform abortions. In 2019, the Illinois General Assembly enacted the Reproductive Health Act, which repealed all earlier state restrictions on abortion before viability, and codified reproductive rights into state law.

=== Indiana ===
Abortion is currently illegal in Indiana, with exceptions for fatal fetal abnormalities, to preserve the life and physical health of the pregnant woman, or (before 10 weeks post-fertilization) in cases of rape or incest.

On April 4, 2024, an Indiana appellate court ruled in favor of a group of plaintiffs who challenged the state's abortion ban on the grounds that it violated their religious beliefs under the state's Religious Freedom Restoration Act. On December 10, 2024, the Indiana Supreme Court denied a petition to transfer the case from the appeals court and sent the case back to the trial judge to decide the case on the merits. On March 5, 2026, a Marion County Superior Court judge granted a permanent injunction preventing Indiana from enforcing its near-total abortion ban against women whose religious beliefs necessitate the procedure.

=== Iowa ===
Abortion in Iowa is illegal after 6 weeks of gestation, with exceptions for rape, incest, fetal abnormalities, and the pregnant woman's life. Parental notification is required for minors under the age of 18.

Iowa implemented its 6-week abortion ban in July 2024.

The exact point of pregnancy at which abortion services will no longer be legal can be different from person to person. The legal limit for getting an abortion can vary from person to person, as the development of the embryo can progress at different rates. A health-care provider can determine how developed the embryo is.

Pregnancy 6 weeks or less:

- One may legally get an abortion in Iowa.
- If under 18, one needs to inform a parent or legal guardian before getting an abortion in Iowa. If notifying a parent or guardian isn't possible, one may apply for a judicial order instead of providing parental notification.
  - There are guidelines to follow when getting an abortion in Iowa. These include...
- Patients forced to make two trips – one for in-person counseling, and another at least 24 hours later for the abortion
- State Medicaid coverage of abortion care is banned, except in very limited circumstances
- Only physicians can provide abortions, and not other qualified health-care professionals

Pregnancy around or past 6 weeks:

If one is more than 6 weeks pregnant, travel out of Iowa for an abortion may be necessary unless a requirement for exception is satisfied. These exceptions include:

- To save one's life
- To prevent serious harm to one's physical health
- If the fetus is not expected to survive the pregnancy
- If the pregnancy results from rape or incest

=== Kansas ===
Abortion is legal in Kansas up to 22 weeks after the last menstrual period (20 weeks post-fertilization). Parental consent is required for minors under the age of 18.

Kansas lawmakers approved sweeping anti-abortion legislation (HB 2253) on April 6, 2013, that says life begins at fertilization, forbids abortion based on "gender", and bans Planned Parenthood from providing sex education in schools. In 2015, Kansas became the first state to ban the dilation and evacuation procedure, a common second-trimester abortion procedure. But the new law was later struck down by the Kansas Court of Appeals in January 2016, without ever having gone into effect.

In April 2019, the Kansas Supreme Court affirmed the lower court's decision, and ruled that the right to abortion is inherent within the state's constitution and bill of rights, such that, even if Roe v. Wade were overturned, and the federal protection of abortion rights is withdrawn, the right would still be allowed within Kansas, barring a change in the state constitution. A proposed constitutional amendment that would have superseded this ruling was decisively rejected by voters on August 2, 2022, six weeks after Roe was overturned in Dobbs v. Jackson Women's Health Organization.

=== Kentucky ===
Abortion is illegal in Kentucky, except when necessary to prevent the patient from dying, or to prevent the permanent impairment of a "life-sustaining organ". There are no exceptions for rape, incest, or fatal fetal abnormalities.

Performing an illegal abortion is a Class C felony, with imprisonment of 5 to 10 years, and fines of $1,000 to $10,000.

The ACLU announced plans to sue the state in court, claiming that the state constitution implicitly recognizes abortion as a legal right. On June 30, 2022, Jefferson County Circuit Judge Mitch Perry issued a temporary restraining order blocking enforcement of the state's abortion ban, pending further hearings to determine if the ban violates the Kentucky Constitution. This order temporarily allows both elective abortion providers, which are both located in Louisville, to temporarily resume elective abortions. Both the Kentucky Court of Appeals and the Kentucky Supreme Court refused a request to dissolve the restraining order; however, the trigger law banning abortions was reinstated on August 1, 2022.

In November 2022, Kentucky voters rejected an amendment that would have denied any right to abortion in the state constitution. On February 16, 2023, the Kentucky Supreme Court ruled that abortion providers lacked standing to challenge the state's abortion ban, but did not elaborate on whether or not the Kentucky Constitution secured abortion rights.

=== Louisiana ===
Abortion is illegal in Louisiana, except in cases of fetal abnormalities or when performed to save the woman's life. There are no exceptions for rape or incest.

A lawsuit by Hope Medical Group for Women and Medical Students for Choice challenging the ban was denied on appeal by the Louisiana Supreme Court in August 2022.

=== Maine ===
Abortion is legal in Maine up to fetal viability. It must be approved as necessary by a licensed physician if it's after fetal viability. Maine does not require a minor to notify a parent or guardian in order to obtain an abortion.

Physicians, physician's assistants, nurse practitioners, and other professional medical providers may perform the procedure.

=== Maryland ===
Abortion is legal in Maryland at all stages of pregnancy. Parental notification is required for minors under the age of 18.

A referendum to codify abortion rights within Maryland's constitution was approved in November 2024.

=== Massachusetts ===
Abortion is legal in Massachusetts at all stages of pregnancy. Parental consent is required for minors under the age of 16.

In December 2020, the Massachusetts state legislature enshrined abortion rights into state law.

=== Michigan ===
Abortion is legal in Michigan, although a physician's approval is needed after fetal viability. Parental consent is required for minors under the age of 18.

While the legal landscape around abortion in Michigan was unclear in the wake of the Dobbs decision due to various conflicting pre-Roe laws that were still on the books, in November 2022, Michigan voters ratified a state constitutional amendment that explicitly added the right to abortion and contraception to the Michigan state constitution.

=== Minnesota ===
Abortion is legal in Minnesota at all stages of pregnancy. In January 2023, the Minnesota Legislature enacted a bill enshrining women's reproductive rights, including the right to legal abortion and contraception, into Minnesota statutes. The Minnesota Supreme Court had previously ruled in 1995 that the Minnesota state constitution conferred a right to abortion. Minnesota also does not require a minor to notify a parent or guardian in order to obtain an abortion.

=== Mississippi ===
Abortion is illegal in Mississippi, with exceptions when the pregnant woman's life is in danger, as well as in rape cases. There are no exceptions for fatal fetal abnormalities.

Attempted or completed abortion is punishable with a maximum of 10 years imprisonment.

=== Missouri ===
Abortion in Missouri is legal up to the point of fetal viability. As of May 2025, however, clinics in the state are not providing abortion services as a legal battle over applicable regulations continues.

From 2022 to 2024, Missouri had a near-total abortion ban, with no exceptions provided for rape, incest, or fatal fetal abnormalities. Amendment 3 was approved by Missouri voters in November 2024, legalizing abortion in the state up to the point of fetal viability. A lawsuit filed in August 2024 by two Republican state legislators and an anti-abortion activist unsuccessfully challenged the initiative.

However, a legal battle continued over clinic regulations that had been part of Missouri law and had significantly restricted access to abortion even before the Dobbs decision. After Amendment 3 went into effect, a state judge struck down many of those regulations, ruling that they now violated the Constitution of Missouri, and several clinics began providing abortion services in the state. However, on May 27, 2025, the Supreme Court of Missouri found that this ruling had left abortion "functionally unregulated" in the state, vacated the earlier order, and ordered the lower court judge to re-evaluate the case based on a new set of criteria, at which point clinics paused abortion services.

=== Montana ===
Abortion is legal in Montana up to the point of fetal viability. A 2024 Montana Supreme Court decision established that minors do not need parental consent to have an abortion, overturning a state statute.

The Montana Supreme Court ruled in 1999 that abortion was a right implicitly granted by the state constitution. Legislative initiatives were enacted in hopes of challenging that ruling. The Montana Legislature enacted a 20-week ban in 2021, and in 2023 enacted a ban on dilation and evacuation, the most common technique used in abortions after 15 weeks. Both laws were blocked by the courts pending a final ruling, and finally invalidated by the ratification of 2024 Montana Initiative 128.

In November 2022, Montana voters rejected a measure that would have given embryos and fetuses legal personhood status. In 2024, Montana voters ratified 2024 Montana Initiative 128, which made abortion an explicit constitutional right.

=== Nebraska ===
Abortion is illegal in Nebraska after 12 weeks of pregnancy. Parental consent is required for minors under the age of 18.

In November 2024, two competing abortion-related referendums appeared on ballots in Nebraska: One would establish a "fundamental right" to abortion until fetal viability, and the other would mandate that "unborn children shall be protected from abortion in the second and third trimester", except in cases of rape, incest, or medical emergency. 2024 Nebraska Initiative 434 was ratified by voters while 2024 Nebraska Initiative 439 was rejected, leaving the 12-week abortion ban in place.

=== Nevada ===
Abortion is legal in Nevada up to 24 weeks of pregnancy. Nevada does not require a minor to notify a parent or guardian in order to obtain an abortion. Until 2026, Nevada was the only state in the country that criminalized a woman performing a self-managed abortion by "any drug, medicine, or substance, or any instrument or other means" after the 24th week of pregnancy.

On July 1, 2024, the State of Nevada formally certified an initiative amendment that would enshrine abortion access up until the point of fetal viability into the state constitution. The Nevada Right to Abortion Initiative was approved in 2024, and was approved again on the November 2026 ballot.

=== New Hampshire ===
Abortion is legal in New Hampshire up to 24 weeks of pregnancy, although state law does not expressly confer abortion rights. Parental consent is required for minors under the age of 18.

=== New Jersey ===
Abortion is legal in New Jersey at all stages of pregnancy. New Jersey does not require a minor to notify a parent or guardian in order to obtain an abortion.

=== New Mexico ===
Abortion is legal in New Mexico at all stages of pregnancy, though state law does not explicitly protect abortion access. New Mexico does not require a minor to notify a parent or guardian in order to obtain an abortion.

=== New York ===
Abortion is legal in New York up to 24 weeks of pregnancy. New York does not require a minor to notify a parent or guardian in order to obtain an abortion.

There are approximately 252 clinics in New York that perform abortions. In 2019, New York codified abortions rights and reproductive freedoms in state law. New York state Senator Alessandra Biaggi proposed a bill during the 2021–2022 session to permit taxpayers in New York to voluntarily contribute to the abortion access fund on their tax forms. This essentially helps create more access to abortion in the state.

2024 New York Proposition 1 was ratified by voters in November 2024. The amendment ensures that no one in New York state can be denied rights based on "ethnicity, national origin, age, and disability", or "sex, including sexual orientation, gender identity, gender expression, pregnancy, pregnancy outcomes, and reproductive health care and autonomy". This expands the already existing Equal Protection Clause in the Constitution of New York which prohibits the denial of rights for a person based on "race, color, creed, or religion".

=== North Carolina ===
Abortion is illegal in North Carolina after the 12th week of pregnancy. In the case of rape or incest, abortion is legal through the 20th week of pregnancy. In the case of a "life-limiting" fetal abnormality, abortion is legal through the 24th week of pregnancy. If the pregnant woman's life is determined by a qualified physician to be at risk from the pregnancy, then abortion can be legally performed at any stage of pregnancy. Parental consent is required for minors under the age of 18, though a minor may obtain a judicial bypass that overrides this consent requirement.

=== North Dakota ===
Abortion in North Dakota is generally illegal. The law technically made exceptions to save the life of the pregnant woman, or, until 6 weeks into a pregnancy, in cases of rape or incest. Abortion was illegal in North Dakota from 2023 to 2024, until Judge Bruce Romanick ruled that the state's abortion ban violated the Constitution of North Dakota's equality provisions. In November 2025, the ban was reinstated, after the North Dakota Supreme Court reversed the temporary holding order.

After the Supreme Court overturned Roe v. Wade on June 24, 2022, North Dakota moved to ban "almost all abortions, except in the case of rape, incest, or where the mother's life is at risk". The ban was temporarily blocked by a court, and permanently enjoined by Judge Romanick in 2024. Performing an abortion under the proposed ban was a Class C felony, punishable by up to five years in prison and up to a $10,000 fine. In January 2025, the North Dakota Supreme Court denied the state government's request to reinstate the total ban. In November 2025, three of the five judges found the law "unconstitutionally vague", but state constitution requires that at least four judges must agree to strike down the law.

Before the Dobbs decision, the only abortion clinic operating in North Dakota was the Red River Women's Clinic, located in Fargo, which is immediately on the border with Minnesota. In light of the legal uncertainty after the decision, the clinic moved to Moorhead, Minnesota, just on the other side of the state line. Even when abortion was decriminalized in North Dakota, there were no abortion providers operational within the state.

=== Northern Mariana Islands ===
Abortion is illegal in the Northern Mariana Islands, and was illegal there before Roe was overturned.

=== Ohio ===
Abortion is legal in Ohio up to fetal viability. After viability, abortion is only legal if, in the professional judgement of an attending physician, the abortion is necessary to protect the pregnant woman's life or health. Parental consent is required for minors under the age of 18.

On November 7, 2023, a majority of Ohio voters voted in favor of Issue 1, which ratified an amendment to the state constitution to establish a constitutional right to abortion up to the point of fetal viability. The constitutional amendment took effect on December 7, 2023. As of 2024, the interaction between the new amendment and previously existing abortion restrictions has not been tested in court. Ohio Attorney General Dave Yost believes that some restrictions that had been passed before the amendment took effect are still constitutional, and abortion providers are not performing abortions after 22 weeks after last menstrual period in compliance with existing law, even though other states define viability as 24 weeks LMP. Legislative proposals to nullify the amendment by taking the power to enforce it out of the hands of state judges were rejected by state House Speaker Jason Stephens.

=== Oklahoma ===
Abortion is illegal in Oklahoma, unless necessary to save the life of the pregnant woman. There are no exceptions for rape, incest, or fatal fetal abnormalities.

In 2016, Oklahoma state legislators passed a bill to criminalize abortion for providers, potentially charging them with up to three years in prison. On May 20, 2016, Governor Mary Fallin vetoed the bill before it could become law, citing its wording as too vague to withstand a legal challenge.

Governor Kevin Stitt signed three bills in 2021 that introduced new restrictions on abortion. One bill would revoke a medical license for people who perform abortions, another would ban abortions if a heartbeat is detected, and the third would require board-certified OB-GYN doctors be the only ones who can perform abortions.

As of 2022, abortion is currently illegal in most cases in Oklahoma. Oklahoma's abortion ban took effect on May 25, 2022, when Governor Kevin Stitt signed HB 4327 into law, and abortion providers have ceased offering services in Oklahoma as of that date. HB 4327 is modeled after the Texas Heartbeat Act, and is enforced solely through civil lawsuits brought by private citizens, making it exceedingly difficult for abortion providers to challenge the constitutionality of the statute in court.

On April 12, 2022, Governor Kevin Stitt signed into law SB 612, a bill that banned abortion indefinitely, unless the life of the pregnant woman was at stake, with no exceptions to rape and incest. The penalty for performing an abortion is two to five years imprisonment.

=== Oregon ===
Abortion is legal in Oregon at all stages of pregnancy.

In 2017, there were 20 facilities providing abortions in Oregon. As of January 2021, there are no major restrictions on abortion in the state, including no requirements for waiting period or parental consent for minors seeking abortions.

=== Pennsylvania ===
Abortion is legal in Pennsylvania up to 24 weeks of pregnancy. Parental consent is required for minors under the age of 18.

In 2024, the Pennsylvania Supreme Court ruled that the state's Medicaid program was required to pay for abortion services for participating residents. The ruling stated that "once the government chooses to provide medical care for the indigent, including necessary care attendant to pregnancy for those women exercising their right to reproductive autonomy who decide to carry a pregnancy to term, the government is obligated to maintain neutrality, so as not to intrude upon the constitutional right to full reproductive autonomy, which includes the right to terminate a pregnancy".

=== Puerto Rico ===
Abortion is legal in Puerto Rico. In 1980, the Supreme Court of Puerto Rico ruled that abortion rights were protected by a clause in the commonwealth's constitution that guaranteed the right to intimacy. Puerto Rico does not require a minor to notify a parent or guardian in order to obtain an abortion.

=== Rhode Island ===
Abortion is legal in Rhode Island up to the point of fetal viability.

71% of residents reported support of passing laws to protect access to safe and legal abortion in 2018. There are some restrictions in Rhode Island, such as parental consent and clinic regulations in order to perform the procedure.

=== South Carolina ===
Abortion is illegal in South Carolina after detection of a "fetal heartbeat", up to 5 or 6 weeks from LMP (on average, 1 to 2 weeks after a missed period), not counting a 24-hour waiting period. Parental consent is required for minors under the age of 17.

A 5-to-6-week abortion ban that had been passed before Dobbs as a trigger law was struck down in January 2023 by the South Carolina Supreme Court, which said it violated the state constitution. A newly passed 5-to-6-week ban went in effect in August 2023, after the justice who wrote the opinion in the original case retired; the new law was judged constitutional by the state supreme court.

=== South Dakota ===
Abortion is illegal in South Dakota, with exceptions to "preserve the life of the pregnant female", given "appropriate and reasonable medical judgement". There are no exceptions for rape, incest, or fatal fetal abnormalities.

The ban was enacted as a trigger law in 2005. Under the law, anyone who induces an abortion is "guilty of a Class 6 felony", with a maximum of two years imprisonment and $4,000 in fines.

In November 2024, South Dakotans voted on Amendment G, which, if passed, would have amended the state constitution to create a right to abortion in the first two trimesters of pregnancy. The amendment failed to pass.

=== Tennessee ===
Abortion is illegal in Tennessee, with exceptions to terminate molar or ectopic pregnancies, to remove a miscarriage, to save the life of a woman who is pregnant, or to "prevent serious risk of substantial and irreversible impairment of a major bodily function of the pregnant woman". Doctors are permitted to use their "reasonable medical judgement, based upon the facts known to the physician at the time", to determine if a situation falls into one of these exceptions. There are no exceptions for rape, incest, or fatal fetal abnormalities. The exceptions in the law were established in April 2023; previously, under a trigger law that went into effect after Dobbs, there were no exceptions to the state's abortion ban, though a doctor charged under the law could assert an affirmative defense that their actions were necessary to save their patient's life. Anyone convicted of breaking the law could face 3 to 15 years in prison, as well as up to $10,000 in fines.

=== Texas ===
Abortion is illegal in Texas, except when necessary to save the pregnant woman's life. There are no exceptions for rape, incest, or fatal fetal abnormalities.

The Roe v. Wade case, tried in Texas, stands at the center of years of national debate about the issue of abortion. Henry Wade was serving as District Attorney of Dallas County at the time.

On August 29, 2014, US District Judge Lee Yeakel struck down as unconstitutional two provisions of Texas' omnibus anti-abortion bill, House Bill 2 that was to come into effect on September 1. The regulation would have closed about a dozen abortion clinics, leaving only eight places in Texas to get a legal abortion, all located in major cities. Judge Lee Yeakel ruled that the state's regulation was unconstitutional, and would have placed an undue burden on women, particularly on poor and rural women living in west Texas and the Rio Grande Valley. The legal challenge to the law eventually reached the Supreme Court in Whole Woman's Health v. Hellerstedt (2016) which ruled that the law was unconstitutional, its burden of requiring abortion doctors to have admission privileges at a local hospital within 30 miles of the center to interfere with a woman's right to an abortion from Roe v. Wade.

In May 2021, Texas lawmakers passed the Texas Heartbeat Act, banning abortions as soon as cardiac activity can be detected, typically as early as six weeks into pregnancy, and often before women know they are pregnant. In order to avoid traditional constitutional challenges based on Roe v. Wade, the law provides that any non-government employee or official, excepting sexual perpetrators who conceived the fetus, may sue anyone that performs or induces an abortion in violation of the statute, as well as anyone who "aids or abets the performance or inducement of an abortion, including paying for or reimbursing the costs of an abortion through insurance or otherwise". The lawsuit may be filed by people either with or without any vested interest. The law contains an exception for abortions performed to save the mother's life. The law was challenged in courts, though had yet to have a full formal hearing as its September 1, 2021, enactment date came due. Plaintiffs sought an order from the U.S. Supreme Court to stop the law from coming into effect, but the Court issued a denial of the order late on September 1, 2021, allowing the law to remain in effect. While unsigned, Chief Justice John Roberts and Justice Stephen Breyer wrote dissenting opinions joined by Justices Elena Kagan and Sonia Sotomayor that they would have granted an injunction on the law until a proper judicial review.

On September 9, 2021, Attorney General Merrick Garland, the United States Department of Justice, sued the State of Texas over the Texas Act on the basis that "the law is invalid under the Supremacy Clause and the Fourteenth Amendment, is preempted by federal law, and violates the doctrine of intergovernmental immunity". Garland further noted that the United States government has "an obligation to ensure that no state can deprive individuals of their constitutional rights". The Complaint avers that Texas enacted the law "in open defiance of the Constitution". The relief requested from the U.S. District Court in Austin, Texas, includes a declaration that the Texas Act is unconstitutional, and an injunction against state actors, as well as any and all private individuals who may bring a SB 8 action. The suit was met with controversy, with critics citing concerns over the suit's politicized nature and the possible infringements on civilian rights.

After the Supreme Court overturned Roe v. Wade on June 24, 2022, Texas completely banned abortions, except when the pregnant woman's life is at risk. Completed or attempted providing of abortion "will be charged with a first- or second-degree felony, and will be subject to a civil penalty of at least $100,000" for each abortion. A first-degree felony in Texas is punishable by 5 to 99 years in prison, while a second-degree felony is punishable by 2 to 20 years in prison, with "fines of up to $10,000" being possible.

On March 7, 2023, five women who suffered serious pregnancy complications, and were denied abortions, sued the state of Texas over their near-total abortion ban, stating that the ban directly put their lives and health in danger. The purpose of the lawsuit is to force the state to issue regulations clarifying the medical exception clause, rather than to overturn Texas's abortion ban entirely.

In 2023, a number of local governments in Texas near the border of New Mexico passed ordinances that make it illegal to transport or to help transport someone through those jurisdictions for the purposes of seeking an abortion. The laws' enforcement mechanism is based on civil lawsuits, like the Texas Heartbeat Act, making them difficult to challenge in court.

=== United States Virgin Islands ===
Abortion is legal in the U.S. Virgin Islands up to 24 weeks of pregnancy.

Residents of the British Virgin Islands often travel to the U.S. Virgin Islands for abortions.

=== Utah ===
Abortion is de facto legal in Utah up to 18 weeks of pregnancy. A near-total trigger ban was passed by the state legislature in 2020; however, this law is being challenged in court by Planned Parenthood of Utah on the grounds that it violates the state constitution, which establishes a right to gender equality and a right to determine family composition. The law was enjoined from going into effect by a state trial court while the challenge to it was being heard, and the Utah Supreme Court upheld that injunction in 2024.

Parental consent is required for minors under the age of 18.

The currently enjoined abortion ban includes exceptions if the pregnant woman's life is at risk, as well as in cases of lethal fetal abnormalities, severe brain abnormalities, rape, or incest. It is a second-degree felony to perform illegal abortions under the law, punishable by 1 to 15 years in prison, and a maximum possible fine of $10,000.

=== Vermont ===
Abortion is legal in Vermont at all stages of pregnancy. Vermont does not require a minor to notify a parent or guardian in order to obtain an abortion.

In November 2022, Vermont residents voted to amend the state's constitution, now explicitly conferring abortion rights.

=== Virginia ===
Abortion is legal in Virginia up to 25 weeks of pregnancy. Parental consent is required for minors under the age of 18.

In 2020, Virginia governor, Ralph Northam signed laws that removed many of the restrictions on abortion that had been in place for decades. Virginia became the first state to codify new protections for abortion rights in 2020. In 2025, Virginia legislators advanced a state referendum that would enshrine reproductive rights within the state's constitution, and voters passed the referendum in 2026.

=== Washington ===
Abortion is legal in the state of Washington. Washington does not require a minor to notify a parent or guardian in order to obtain an abortion. In 2025, Washington legislators advanced a state referendum that would enshrine abortion rights within the state's constitution.

=== West Virginia ===
Abortion is illegal in West Virginia, except if necessary to preserve the life or health of a pregnant woman, if the fetus has a fatal anomaly, or if (up to 14 weeks) the pregnancy is the result of rape or incest. The near-total ban on abortions is currently being challenged in court.

=== Wisconsin ===
Abortion is legal in Wisconsin. An initial July 2023 ruling by a Dane County trial judge found that an 1849 law previously considered a trigger ban does not apply to consensual abortions performed by medical staff. Abortion providers in Milwaukee and Dane Counties offer abortions up to 22 weeks. Parental consent is required for minors under the age of 18.

Providers in Wisconsin stopped offering abortion services in the aftermath of Dobbs due to the 1849 law. However, Wisconsin Attorney General Josh Kaul, a supporter of abortion rights, sued in state court to attempt to overturn the law; the Dane County ruling was the first in that case. Abortions are offered by Planned Parenthood of Wisconsin in Milwaukee, Dane, and Sheboygan Counties, whose district attorneys have stated that they will not file charges based on the 1849 ban. The organization initially did not resume abortions at its clinic in Sheboygan County, whose district attorney has stated that he believes the law still applies; however, they announced that abortion services would resume on December 28, 2023. The case was expected to be ultimately decided by the Wisconsin Supreme Court; Janet Protasiewicz, an abortion rights supporter, was elected in 2023, in a contest in which abortion was a major subject of debate. On July 2, 2025, the Wisconsin Supreme Court struck down the 1849 law.

In 2013, Act 37 was passed into law, necessitating admitting privileges for all abortion providers within the state. Admitting privileges allow physicians the right to directly admit a patient to a nearby hospital. The state maintained that this was necessary for women's health and safety; however, public health officials and the medical community – including the American College of Gynecologists and Obstetricians, Wisconsin Medical Society, and American Public Health Association – oppose these requirements as unnecessary and not grounded in evidence-based practice. Not only are these privileges difficult for abortion physicians to obtain, given the controversial nature of abortion, the Wisconsin law required admitting privileges to be obtained within one day of the law's passage. After Governor Walker signed the bill into law, a federal district court judge in the Western District of Wisconsin immediately granted a preliminary injunction, preventing its implementation. A trial was held, and the court imposed a permanent injunction against the law, with the Judge noting that clinic closure was clearly the purpose of the law, as there was only one day granted for physicians to obtain compliance. Further, the ruling found that abortion complications "are rare, and are rarely dangerous"; thus, it seems to undermine the argument that this law is needed for women's health and safety.

The case was appealed by the state's attorney; yet, the US Court of Appeals for the Seventh Circuit upheld the earlier ruling, and the permanent injunction. The appeals court declared, as did the trial court judge, that the state had failed to demonstrate any obvious need for this legislation. The state further appealed to the Supreme Court; however, this appeal was rejected, maintaining the permanent injunction of the law. The rejection by the Supreme Court to hear the case came rather quickly after the ruling in the state of Texas' case also involving admitting privileges. The Supreme Court's ruling in Whole Women's Health v. Hellerstedt found that the admitting privileges requirement created an undue burden for women, and thus interfered with the rights established in Roe v. Wade.

=== Wyoming ===
Abortion in Wyoming is legal until fetal viability. A 6-week ban was signed into law in 2026, however the law was challenged and a court temporarily blocked it from taking effect while the lawsuit proceeds. Parental consent is required for minors under the age of 18.

In 2022, state legislation attempted to make abortion illegal, except in cases of rape, incest, or harm to the health of the pregnant woman, but enforcement was blocked by the courts, pending a final decision on the law's constitutionality. The ban was struck down by a Wyoming judge in November 2024, a ruling upheld by the Wyoming Supreme Court in January 2026. The court found that the law violated the Wyoming Constitution, stating that "whether to terminate or continue a pregnancy is a woman's own health care decision protected by Article 1, Section 38." This provision had been passed by voters in 2012 as Constitutional Amendment A as part of the backlash against the Affordable Care Act.

On March 9, 2026, Governor Mark Gordon signed a heartbeat law passed by the Wyoming Legislature. Opponents vowed to challenge the law in state court based on the January 2026 decision. Gordon said that while he supported the law, it was a "fragile legal effort with significant risk of ending in the courts rather than in lasting, durable policy" and suggested that the issue should ultimately be decided by state voters.

== State table ==
=== Limits on abortion ===
Abortion is not legal at any gestational age in states displayed with a pink background. Additional limitations are given regardless, as the legality of abortion may change.

State	On-demand gestational limit	Waiting period	Mandatory ultrasound	Mandatory Social Counseling	% of counties without provider (2017)	Parental notification for minors	Parental consent for minors	Active Legislation
Alabama	Fertilization	N/A; abortion is banned here.	N/A; abortion is banned here.	N/A; abortion is banned here.	100%	N/A; abortion is banned here.	N/A; abortion is banned here.	
Alaska	At any stage	None	No	Yes	37%	No	No	
Arizona	Viability	Yes	Yes	Yes	80%	Yes	Yes	
Arkansas	Fertilization	N/A; abortion is banned here.	N/A; abortion is banned here.	N/A; abortion is banned here.	100%	N/A; abortion is banned here.	N/A; abortion is banned here.	
California	Viability	None	No	None	5%	No	No	
Colorado	At any stage	None	No	None	27%	Yes	No	
Connecticut	Viability	None	No	None	5%	No	No	
Delaware	Viability	None	No	Yes	33%	Yes	No	
Florida	6 weeks	None	Yes	None	20%	Yes	Yes	
Georgia	6 weeks	Yes	No	Yes	58%	Yes	No	
Hawaii	Viability	None	No	None	5%	No	No	
Idaho	Fertilization	N/A; abortion is banned here.	N/A; abortion is banned here.	N/A; abortion is banned here.	100%	N/A; abortion is banned here.	N/A; abortion is banned here.	
Illinois	Viability	None	No	None	40%	No	No	
Indiana	Fertilization	N/A; abortion is banned here.	N/A; abortion is banned here.	N/A; abortion is banned here.	100%	N/A; abortion is banned here.	N/A; abortion is banned here.	
Iowa	6 weeks	None	No	None	42%	Yes	No	
Kansas	22 weeks	Yes	Yes	Yes	56%	No	One	
Kentucky	Fertilization	N/A; abortion is banned here.	N/A; abortion is banned here.	N/A; abortion is banned here.	100%	N/A; abortion is banned here.	N/A; abortion is banned here.	
Louisiana	Fertilization	N/A; abortion is banned here.	N/A; abortion is banned here.	N/A; abortion is banned here.	100%	N/A; abortion is banned here.	N/A; abortion is banned here.	
Maine	Viability	None	No	None	55%	No	No	
Maryland	At any stage	None	No	None	24%	Yes	No	
Massachusetts	At any stage	None	No	Yes	14%	No	One	
Michigan	At any stage	No	No	No	40%	No	One	
Minnesota	At any stage	No	No	No	59%	No	No	
Mississippi	Fertilization	N/A; abortion is banned here.	N/A; abortion is banned here.	N/A; abortion is banned here.	100%	N/A; abortion is banned here.	N/A; abortion is banned here.	
Missouri	Viability	No	No	No	~97%	No	No	
Montana	Viability	None	No	None	55%	No	No	
Nebraska	12 weeks	Yes	No	Yes	41%	No	One	
Nevada	24 weeks	None	No	None	9%	No	No	
New Hampshire	Viability	None	No	None	30%	Yes	No	
New Jersey	At any stage	None	No	None	23%	No	No	
New Mexico	At any stage	None	No	None	48%	No	No	
New York	24 weeks	None	No	None	10%	No	No	
North Carolina	12 weeks	None	No	None	53%	No	One	
North Dakota	Fertilization	N/A; abortion is banned here.	N/A; abortion is banned here.	N/A; abortion is banned here.	100%	N/A; abortion is banned here.	N/A; abortion is banned here.	
Ohio	Viability	No	No	Yes	56%	No	One	
Oklahoma	Fertilization	N/A; abortion is banned here.	N/A; abortion is banned here.	N/A; abortion is banned here.	100%	N/A; abortion is banned here.	N/A; abortion is banned here.	
Oregon	At any stage	None	No	None	30%	No	No	
Pennsylvania	24 weeks	Yes	No	Yes	48%	No	One	
Rhode Island	Viability	None	No	Yes	36%	No	One	
South Carolina	6 weeks	Yes	No	Yes	71%	No	One	
South Dakota	Fertilization	N/A; abortion is banned here.	N/A; abortion is banned here.	N/A; abortion is banned here.	100%	N/A; abortion is banned here.	N/A; abortion is banned here.	
Tennessee	Fertilization	N/A; abortion is banned here.	N/A; abortion is banned here.	N/A; abortion is banned here.	100%	N/A; abortion is banned here.	N/A; abortion is banned here.	
Texas	Fertilization	N/A; abortion is banned here.	N/A; abortion is banned here.	N/A; abortion is banned here.	100%	N/A; abortion is banned here.	N/A; abortion is banned here.	
Utah	18 weeks	Yes	No	Yes	62%	Yes	One	
Vermont	At any stage	None	No	None	38%	No	No	
Virginia	25 weeks	Yes	24 hours	Yes	78%	Yes	One	
Washington	Viability	None	No	None	15%	No	No	
West Virginia	Fertilization	N/A; abortion is banned here.	N/A; abortion is banned here.	N/A; abortion is banned here.	100%	N/A; abortion is banned here.	N/A; abortion is banned here.	
Wisconsin	22 weeks	Yes	24 hours	Yes	67%	No	One	
Wyoming	Viability	None	No	None	96%	Yes	One	

=== Protections of abortion rights ===
States in which the right to an abortion is protected (either through state law, a state supreme court ruling, or both) or restricted. Abortion access protected by state statute Abortion access protected by state Constitution Abortion access protected via both state statute and state Constitution No state level protections Abortion access restricted by state Constitution

State	State constitutional protection
Alabama	No (Note: This state's constitution has been amended to reject any right to an abortion.)
Alaska	Yes
Arizona	Yes (Note: This state's constitution has been amended via referendum to protect the right to an abortion.)
Arkansas	No
California	Yes
Colorado	Yes
Connecticut	No
Delaware	No
Florida	No
Georgia	No
Hawaii	No
Idaho	No
Illinois	Yes
Indiana	No
Iowa	No
Kansas	Yes
Kentucky	No
Louisiana	No
Maine	No
Maryland	Yes
Massachusetts	No
Michigan	Yes
Minnesota	Yes
Mississippi	No
Missouri	Yes
Montana	Yes
Nebraska	No
Nevada	Yes
New Hampshire	No
New Jersey	No
New Mexico	No
New York	Yes
North Carolina	No
North Dakota	No
Ohio	Yes
Oklahoma	No
Oregon	No
Pennsylvania	No
Rhode Island	No
South Carolina	No
South Dakota	No
Tennessee	No (Note: This state's constitution has been amended to reject any right to an abortion. See: 2014 Tennessee Amendment 1)
Texas	No
Utah	No
Vermont	Yes
Virginia	Yes
Washington	No
West Virginia	No
Wisconsin	No
Wyoming	Yes

=== Ballot measures since Dobbs ===
Following the Dobbs decision which overturned Roe v. Wade, 18 states have so far held ballot initiatives to either protect/reduce abortion rights in the state or to add/reduce protections for abortion rights in the state constitution. In the 18 states that have so far held referendums on the abortion issue, 14 have seen the abortion rights side win, and 4 have seen the abortion rights side lose. One of the four times when the abortion rights side lost, i. e. in Florida, required a 60% vote in favor, rather than 50%, in order to pass, and only got 57%.

State	Votes in favor of legalized abortion	Percentage in favor of legalized abortion	Votes opposed to legalized abortion	Percentage opposed to legalized abortion	Notes
Kansas	557,837	59.16%	385,014	40.84%	Ballot held on August 2, 2022
California	7,176,888	66.88%	3,553,564	33.12%	Ballot held on November 8, 2022
Kentucky	742,232	52.35%	675,634	47.65%	Ballot held on November 8, 2022
Michigan	2,482,382	56.66%	1,898,906	43.34%	Ballot held on November 8, 2022
Vermont	212,323	76.77%	64,239	23.23%	Ballot held on November 8, 2022
Ohio	2,227,384	56.78%	1,695,480	43.22%	Ballot held on November 7, 2023
Arizona	2,000,287	61.61%	1,246,202	38.39%	Ballot held on November 5, 2024
Colorado	1,921,593	61.97%	1,179,261	38.03%	Ballot held on November 5, 2024; Colorado requires a 55% vote to pass a constitutional amendment.
Florida	6,070,758	57.17%	4,548,379	42.83%	Ballot held on November 5, 2024; Florida requires a 60% vote to pass a constitutional amendment.
Maryland	2,199,319	76.06%	692,219	23.94%	Ballot held on November 5, 2024
Missouri	1,538,659	51.60%	1,443,022	48.40%	Ballot held on November 5, 2024
Montana	345,070	57.76%	252,300	42.24%	Ballot held on November 5, 2024
Nebraska	455,184; 417,624	49.01% 45.06%	473,652; 509,288	50.99% 54.94%	Ballot held on November 5, 2024; The first referendum was whether to support the right to abortion up to fetal viability, with 50.99% voting against A simultaneous second referendum restricting abortion after 12 weeks of pregnancy passed with 54.94% voting in favor.
Nevada	905,170	64.36%	501,232	35.64%	Ballot held on November 5, 2024
New York	4,757,097	62.47%	2,857,663	37.53%	Ballot held on November 5, 2024
South Dakota	176,809	41.41%	250,136	58.59%	Ballot held on November 5, 2024
Idaho	318,849	44.06%	404,870	55.94%	Ballot held on November 3, 2026
Missouri	1,173,172	55.49%	941,065	44.51%	Ballot held on November 3, 2026 (This was the second vote, the first was held in 2024)
Nevada	671,565	63.50%	386,076	36.50%	Ballot held on November 3, 2026 (This was the second vote, the first was held in 2024)
Virginia	2,182,174	62.37%	1,316,529	37.63%	Ballot held on November 3, 2026
Total	38,532,376	60.39%	25,274,731	39.61%	

== See also ==
- Abortion statistics in the United States
- Abortion by country
- Abortion and religion
- Heartbeat bill
- Types of abortion restrictions in the United States
