= Abortion in Wyoming =

Abortion in Wyoming is legal.

Abortion was a criminal offence in Wyoming in 1950. Less-restrictive abortion legislation was introduced in 1997 but not passed. In 2013, a fetal heartbeat bill was introduced in the Wyoming House of Representatives but never made it out of committee. In January 2017, a mandatory ultrasound law went into effect, however, it lacked an enforcement mechanism.

The number of abortion clinics in the state has been on the decline since the late 20th century, going from eight in 1982 to five in 1992 to one in 2014, and remaining at that total in 2016, 2017 and 2019. At the same time, a few medical facilities in the state have quietly offered abortion services to women. In 2017, 140 abortions took place in the state, representing nearly 0.0% of all such procedures in the US that year. Some Wyomingites participated in Stop the Bans rallies in May 2019 to advocate for women's right to abortion.

The 2023 American Values Atlas reported that, in their most recent survey, 52% of people from Wyoming said that abortion should be legal in all or most cases.

== 2020s ==
On March 15, 2022, Wyoming's legislature passed HB92, a trigger law that would ban abortion beginning five days after the anticipated overturn of Roe v. Wade. Under HB92, abortion is illegal except for cases of rape, incest (reported to law enforcement) and serious risk of death or "substantial and irreversible physical impairments" for the pregnant woman. After the U.S. Supreme Court overruled Roe v. Wade on June 24, 2022, in Dobbs v. Jackson Women's Health Organization, abortion ceased to be a federally protected right.

A temporary court injunction was filed against an attempted near total abortion ban in 2023, and a Wyoming judge struck down the abortion ban in 2024. On March 17, 2023, Wyoming Governor Mark Gordon signed a law banning abortion pills, becoming the first state in the country to do so. However, the ban was found unconstitutional and struck down on November 18, 2024.

In February 2025, Wyoming passed House Bill 42, requiring abortion facilities to meet ambulatory surgical center requirements, and House Bill 64, mandating that women undergo an ultrasound before taking abortion pills. Governor Mark Gordon signed HB42 into law, but vetoed HB64, claiming it was too invasive. The Wyoming legislature overrode his veto, enacting HB64. The regulations forced Wellspring Health Access, the state's only abortion clinic, to cease abortion services. However, the laws were blocked on April 21, 2025.

On January 6, 2026, the Wyoming Supreme Court ruled abortion restrictions unconstitutional under the Wyoming Constitution, stating that "whether to terminate or continue a pregnancy is a woman’s own health care decision protected by Article 1, Section 38", passed by voters in 2012 as Constitutional Amendment A. On March 9, Governor Mark Gordon signed a ban on abortion after a fetal heartbeat can be detected, which is around six weeks' gestation. The only exception would be for a situation that "substantially endangers" the mother's "life or health". However, the law was challenged, and a court temporarily blocked it from taking effect while the lawsuit proceeds.

== History ==
In 2017, there were medical facilities that would perform abortions, but they did not make this information public, and women could only find out about these services if they were existing patients.

=== Legislative history ===
In 1950, the state legislature passed a law stating that a woman who had an abortion or actively sought to have an abortion regardless of whether she went through with it was guilty of a criminal offense. It is not clear how often the law was enforced. A bill protecting women's access to abortion was introduced in 1997 but did not succeed in getting a floor vote.

A fetal heartbeat bill, HB 97, was introduced in the Wyoming House of Representatives in January 2013 by Kendell Kroeker; however, in February 2013 the bill was struck down by a house committee in a 4–5 vote. The state legislature was one of five states nationwide that tried to pass such a bill that year. On July 1, 2017, a law passed by the state legislature went into effect the prohibited the sale of fetal tissue. Another law that went into effect that day required abortion service providers to give women seeking abortions an ultrasound, but it had no enforcement component. As of May 14, 2019, the state prohibited abortions after the fetus was viable, generally some point between week 24 and 28. This period uses a standard defined by the US Supreme Court in 1973 with the Roe v. Wade ruling.

=== Judicial history ===
The US Supreme Court's decision in 1973's Roe v. Wade ruling meant the state could not regulate abortion in the first trimester. However, the Supreme Court overturned Roe v. Wade in Dobbs v. Jackson Women's Health Organization, No. 19-1392, 597 U.S. ___ (2022) later in 2022. However, a judge in Wyoming found that abortion bans violate the state constitution's clause providing for the right of Wyomingites to make their own health care decisions, passed in a 2012 ballot measure. The abortion ban was struck down in November 2024 by Teton County District Judge Melissa Owens.

In 2026, a Wyoming judge struck down the state's mandatory ultrasound requirement, 48-hour waiting period, more stringent clinic regulations and abortion medication restrictions, ruling them unconstitutional under the 2012 Wyoming Amendment A.

=== Clinic history ===
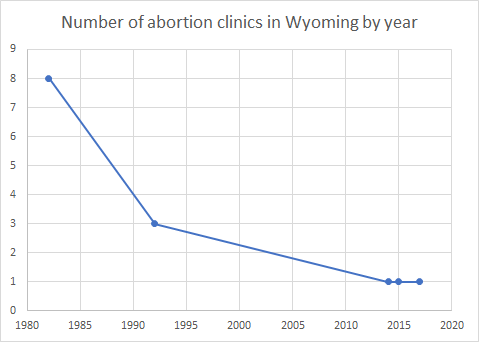
Number of abortion clinics in Wyoming by year

Between 1982 and 1992, the total number of abortion clinics in the state declined by three, going from eight to five. In 1990, family practice Emerg-A-Care opened in Jackson as urgent care so that tourists in the area would feel comfortable visiting if they needed medical treatment. Among the services it offered were abortion services.

In 2014, there was only one abortion clinic in the state; 96% of counties in the state did not have an abortion clinic, and 96% of women in the state aged 15–44 lived in a county without an abortion clinic. In March 2016, there was only one Planned Parenthood clinic in the state. After Planned Parenthood of the Rocky Mountains switched from directly billing women to directly billing Medicaid in 2016, it ran into funding bills as Medicaid has low reimbursement rates. Consequently, it was forced to close two clinics in Colorado and the one in Wyoming in July 2017. As of July 21, 2017, Kentucky, Louisiana, Mississippi, North Dakota, West Virginia, and Wyoming were the only six states that did not have a Planned Parenthood clinic offering abortion services. Of these states, North Dakota and Wyoming were the only two without a Planned Parenthood clinic. In 2017, there was still considered to be only one abortion clinic in the state, but there were claims that two other providers privately offered abortions for existing patients. These health centers provided around one to five abortions a year. Emerg-A-Care also served women from Eastern Idaho. Less than 0.5% of their practice involved providing abortion services. Of the abortions performed in 2017, 80% were medical.

In 2020, Emerg-A-Care was sold to a local hospital.

In late 2023, an abortion provider closed due to rising costs, leaving Wellspring Health Access as the only abortion clinic in the state.

== Historical statistics ==
In the period between 1972 and 1974, there were zero reported illegal abortion deaths in the state. In 1990, 50,000 women were at risk of unintended pregnancies. In 2014, 48% of adults said in a poll by the Pew Research Center that abortion should be legal in all or most cases. In 2017, the state had an infant mortality rate of 4.6 deaths per 1,000 live births. High infant mortality and lack of access to reproductive health care are closely correlated in Wyoming, as in many other states.

Number of reported abortions, abortion rate and percentage change in rate by geographic region and state in 1992, 1995 and 1996
Census division and state	Number			Rate			% change 1992–1996
Census division and state	1992	1995	1996	1992	1995	1996	% change 1992–1996
US total	1,528,930	1,363,690	1,365,730	25.9	22.9	22.9	–12
Mountain	69,600	63,390	67,020	21	17.9	18.6	–12
Arizona	20,600	18,120	19,310	24.1	19.1	19.8	–18
Colorado	19,880	15,690	18,310	23.6	18	20.9	–12
Idaho	1,710	1,500	1,600	7.2	5.8	6.1	–15
Montana	3,300	3,010	2,900	18.2	16.2	15.6	–14
Nevada	13,300	15,600	15,450	44.2	46.7	44.6	1
New Mexico	6,410	5,450	5,470	17.7	14.4	14.4	–19
Utah	3,940	3,740	3,700	9.3	8.1	7.8	–16
Wyoming	460	280	280	4.3	2.7	2.7	–37

Number, rate, and ratio of reported abortions, by reporting area of residence and occurrence and by percentage of abortions obtained by out-of-state residents, US CDC estimates
Location	Residence			Occurrence			% obtained by out-of-state residents	Year	Ref
Location	No.	Rate^	Ratio^^	No.	Rate^^	Ratio^^	% obtained by out-of-state residents	Year	Ref
Wyoming	642	5.8	83	—	—	—	—	2014	
Wyoming	493	4.5	67	—	—	—	—	2016	
^number of abortions per 1,000 women aged 15–44; ^^number of abortions per 1,000 live births

== Financing ==
In 1998, women could only receive public funds for an abortion if continuing the pregnancy put their life at risk, if the pregnancy was a result of rape that was reported within five days of it occurring, or was a result of incest. In 2010, the state had zero publicly funded abortions.

== Abortion rights views and activities ==
=== Dissent against restrictive laws ===
Women from the state participated in rallies supporting access to abortion as part of the Stop the Bans (#StoptheBans) effort in May 2019. Wyoming Equality was one of the organizers for the Cheyenne #StoptheBans protest that drew women from across the state.

Following the overturn of Roe v. Wade on June 24, 2022, dozens of abortion rights protestors rallied and marched outside Wyoming's only clinic offering abortion services in Casper.

== Anti-abortion views and activities ==
=== Violence ===
In 1994, a domestic terrorist responsible for attacks in multiple states bombed the Emerg-A-Care health center in Jackson during the night, causing large amounts of smoke damage that resulted in the clinic being closed for several weeks.

On May 25, 2022, a masked woman set a fire at a planned abortion clinic in Casper, Wyoming. The ATF offered a $5,000 reward for information leading to her arrest. In 2023, 22-year old Lorna Green pleaded guilty to the arson and was sentenced to 5 years in prison and $298,000 in restitution.
