= Justin Wayne =

Justin Wayne may refer to:

- Justin Wayne (baseball) (born 1979), American professional baseball player
- Justin Wayne (politician) (born 1979), American politician from Nebraska
