= Senator Wayne =

Senator Wayne may refer to:

- Isaac Wayne (1772–1852), Pennsylvania State Senate
- Justin Wayne (politician) (born 1979), Nebraska State Senate
