= 2024 Nebraska Initiative 434 =

Proposed amendment to the Nebraska Constitution

- November 5, 2024
- Nebraska Protect Women & Children Initiative; Shall the Nebraska Constitution be amended to include a new section which provides: “Except when a woman seeks an abortion necessitated by a medical emergency or when the pregnancy results from sexual assault or incest, unborn children shall be protected from abortion in the second and third trimesters."

Results
Choice	Votes	%
Yes	509,288	54.94%
No	417,624	45.06%
Valid votes	926,912	100.00%
Invalid or blank votes	0	0.00%
Total votes	926,912	100.00%
Registered voters/turnout	1,263,487	73.36%

Yes
80–90%
70–80%
60–70%
50–60%
No
60–70%
50–60%

Nebraska Initiative 434, officially titled "Nebraska Protect Women & Children Initiative" or "Prohibit Abortions After the First Trimester Amendment", and listed on the ballot as Initiative Measure 434, was a proposed constitutional amendment that appeared on the November 5, 2024 ballot in Nebraska. It amends the Nebraska Constitution to ban elective abortions in the second and third trimester, though it allows more restrictive laws such as the 12-week ban passed by the Legislature in 2023, which like the constitutional amendment includes exceptions for rape, incest and medical emergencies. Initiative 434 and Initiative 439 were mutually exclusive; only the one with more votes in favor would become law in the event both amendments passed.

Initiative 434 was approved by Nebraskan voters with approximately 55% in favor, beating out the pro-abortion-rights amendment, Initiative 439, which failed due to only receiving approximately 49% in favor.

== Background ==
=== Legislative history ===
In April 2023, LB626, the Nebraska Heartbeat Act, failed 32–15, falling one vote short of the 33 votes needed to end a filibuster. If enacted, the bill would have outlawed abortion at six weeks with exceptions for rape, incest, and medical emergency.

Then, after LB626 failed in April, after Ben Hansen vote against LB626, he amendment LB574 to add Abortion on the bill. In May 2023, LB574, the Adopt the Let Them Grow Act, approved 33–15, it was one vote above of the 33 votes needed to end a filibuster. Nebraska enacted a law banning most abortions after 12 weeks of pregnancy, with exceptions for cases of rape, incest, and to save the life of the pregnant person. This law replaced the previous 20-week abortion ban.

==== Nebraska Heartbeat Act vote ====
The bill was failed by the senate on April 27 by a 32–15-2 vote. Senators Justin Wayne and Ben Hansen, who did not vote. Later, Ben Hansen modified his votes to yes.

Unicameral vote
Party	Votes for	Votes against	Not Voting
Democratic (17)	1: Mike McDonnell	15	1: Justin Wayne
Republican (33)	31	–	1: Ben Hansen
Total (49)	32	15	2

==== Adopt the Let Them Grow Act vote ====
The bill was approved by the senate on May 19 by a 33–15-1 vote. Senators Justin Wayne, who did not vote.

Unicameral vote
Party	Votes for	Votes against	Not Voting
Democratic (17)	1: Mike McDonnell	15	1: Justin Wayne
Republican (33)	32	–	–
Total (49)	33	15	1

==== Aftermath ====
In November 2022, a Hart Research poll revealed that 59% of Nebraskans opposed further abortion restrictions, with 48% strongly opposed. Only 36% supported additional bans, highlighting increased support for abortion rights across both rural and urban areas, as well as all congressional districts. In response to recent legislative restrictions, citizens initiated a petition drive aiming to place a constitutional amendment on the 2024 ballot. This amendment would seek to protect abortion rights in Nebraska.

In response, citizens began a petition drive to place a constitutional amendment that would ban elective abortion in the second and third trimester, with exceptions for rape, incest and medical emergency.

== Ballot measure ==
The proposed amendment would add the following text to Article I of the Nebraska Constitution:

Except when a woman seeks an abortion necessitated by a medical emergency or when the pregnancy results from sexual assault or incest, unborn children shall be protected from abortion in the second and third trimesters.

In addition to the proposed amendment, the house resolution also added an explanatory statement to the ballot paper as follows:

A vote for will amend the Nebraska Constitution to provide that, except when a woman seeks an abortion necessitated by a medical emergency or when the pregnancy results from sexual assault or incest, unborn children shall be protected from abortion in the second and third trimesters.

A vote against will not amend the Nebraska Constitution in such manner.

== Polling ==
Poll source	Date(s) administered	Sample size (Note: Key: A – all adults RV – registered voters LV – likely voters V – unclear)	Margin of error	For	Against	Undecided
SurveyUSA (Note: Poll sponsored by Split Ticket)	August 23–27, 2024	1,293 (RV)	± 3.5%	56%	29%	15%

== Results ==
Initiative 434
Choice	Votes	%
For	509,288	54.94
Against	417,624	45.06
Total	926,912	100.00
Source: Secretary of State of Nebraska

=== By congressional district ===
"Yes" won two of three congressional districts, with "No" winning the remaining one, which elected a Republican.

District	Yes	No	Representative
1st	52%	48%	Mike Flood
2nd	47%	53%	Don Bacon
3rd	67%	33%	Adrian Smith

== See also ==
- 2024 United States ballot measures
- Abortion in Nebraska
- Initiatives and referendums in the United States

=== Other abortion referendums ===
- 2024 Nebraska Initiative 439
- 2022 Kansas abortion referendum
- 2022 California Proposition 1
- 2022 Michigan Proposal 3
- 2022 Vermont Proposal 5
- 2024 Arizona Proposition 139
- 2024 Colorado Amendment 79
- 2024 Florida Amendment 4
- 2024 Maryland Question 1
- 2024 Missouri Amendment 3
- 2024 Montana Initiative 128
- 2024 Nevada Question 6
- 2024 New York Proposal 1
- 2024 South Dakota Amendment G
