= Stop the Bans =

May 2019 protests in the United States

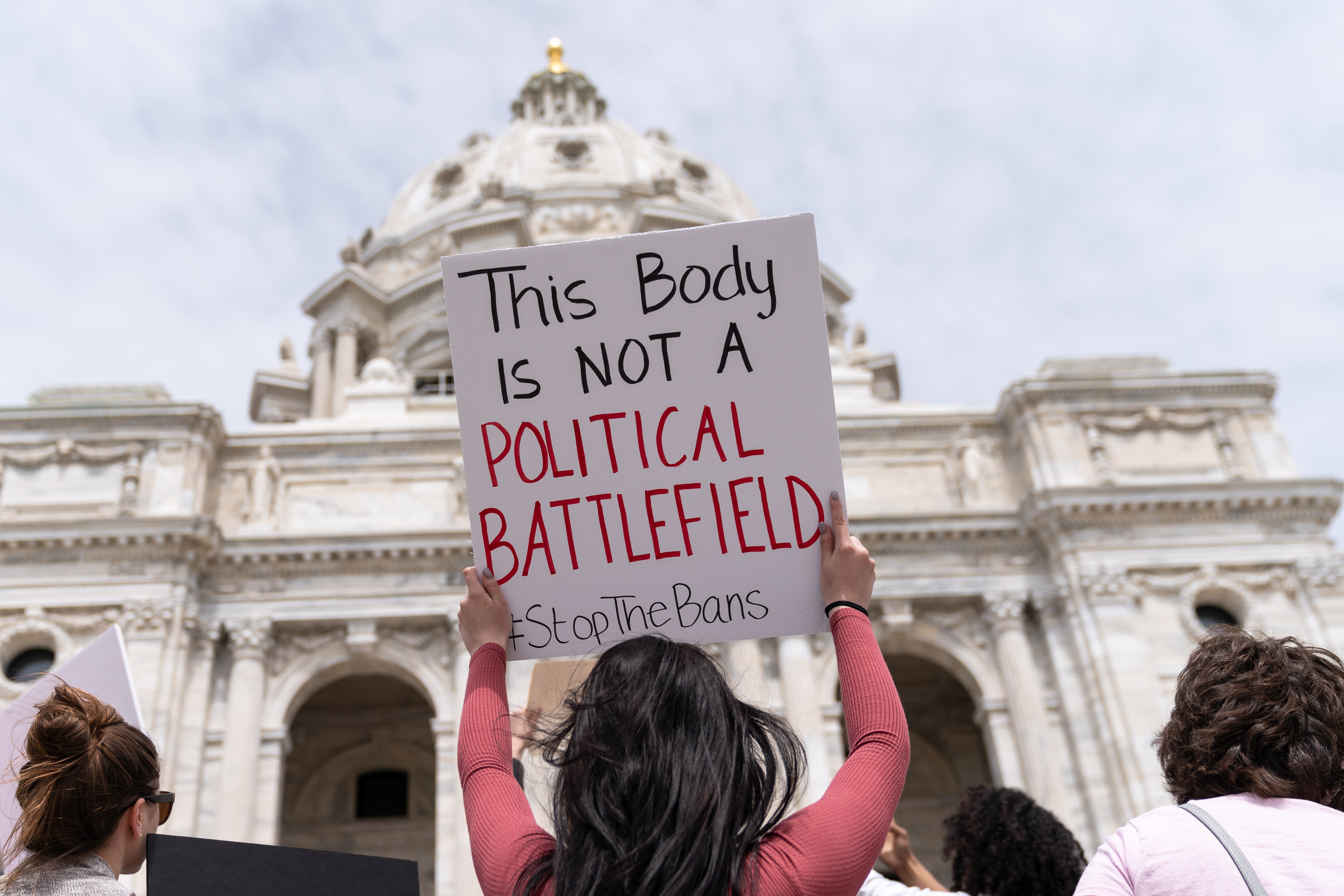
- Rally in front of the Minnesota State Capitol
- Date: May 21, 2019
- Location: United States
- Type: Demonstrations
- Organized by: American Civil Liberties Union; NARAL Pro-Choice America; Planned Parenthood

Stop the Bans was a series of rallies held in the United States on May 21, 2019, protesting abortion bans and restrictions. Supporting organizations include the American Civil Liberties Union (ACLU), NARAL Pro-Choice America, and Planned Parenthood. Protesters at the Stop the Bans rallies were concerned about women's rights being eroded. Demonstrators at the rallies felt that politicians should not be making medical decisions about women's bodies.

== Exigence ==
In 2019, nine states implemented gestational age bans on abortion, including, Georgia, Kentucky, Louisiana, Mississippi, Ohio, Missouri, Arkansas, Utah, and Alabama. Abortion rights supporters considered these bans as extreme.

Alabama's ban was the most restrictive, aiming to make abortion illegal in all cases including those of incest and rape, and allowing doctors to face 99 years in prison for performing abortions. Supporters also considered laws regarding abortion in Michigan to be extreme. Within Nebraska, North Dakota, Kentucky, and Oklahoma, legislators moved to enact abortion counseling requirements. Additionally, four of the aforementioned states banned abortions based on a patient’s reason for seeking an abortion.

These bans challenged the abortion standards set forth in Roe v. Wade, which for 46 years prior allowed women to get abortions until fetuses were "viable" which medical professionals gauge as occurring 24-28 weeks into a pregnancy. These bans were enacted following Donald Trump's attempt to roll back abortion laws (specifically implementing Global Gag Rules). Protestors at the New York demonstrations described themselves as responding to a change in the governments relationship to abortion.

Between the start of 2011 and May 31, 2019, almost 500 abortion restrictions were created across 33 states, accounting for more than one third of abortion restrictions enacted since Roe v. Wade's initial legalization (1973).

== Locations ==
Demonstrations were organized in possibly all fifty U.S. states.

=== Northeast ===
- Boston
- Philadelphia
- Providence, Rhode Island

New York saw protests in Manhattan and Mineola.

=== South ===
- Atlanta
- Charlottesville, Virginia
- Louisville, Kentucky
- Myrtle Beach, South Carolina
- Nashville, Tennessee
- Raleigh, North Carolina
- Washington, D.C.
- Wilmington, Delaware

Florida saw demonstrations in Fort Myers and St. Petersburg.

In Maryland, there were protests in Annapolis and Towson.

In Texas, there was a rally held in El Paso at the County Courthouse.

=== Midwest ===
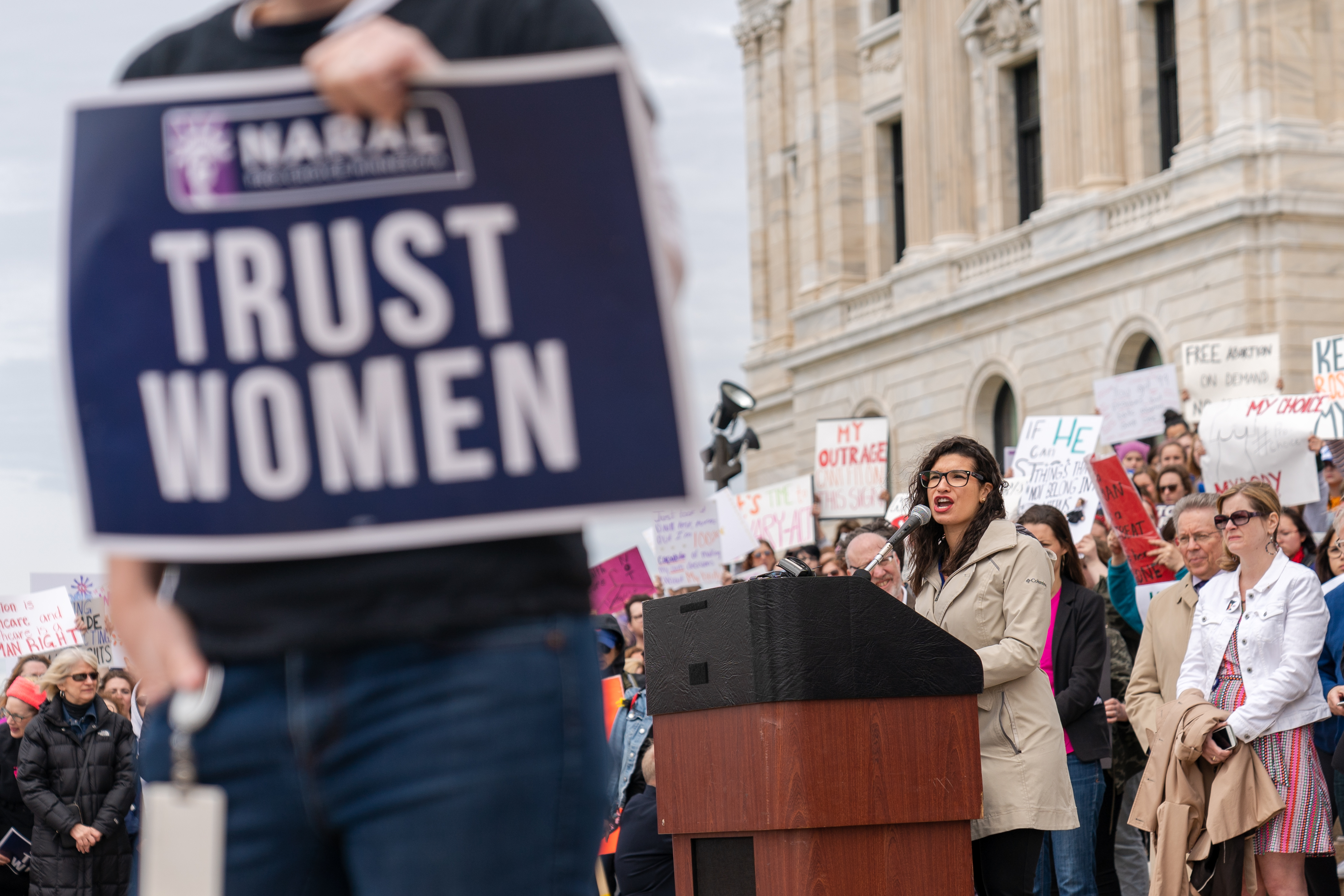
Erin Maye Quade speaking at the demonstration in Saint Paul, Minnesota

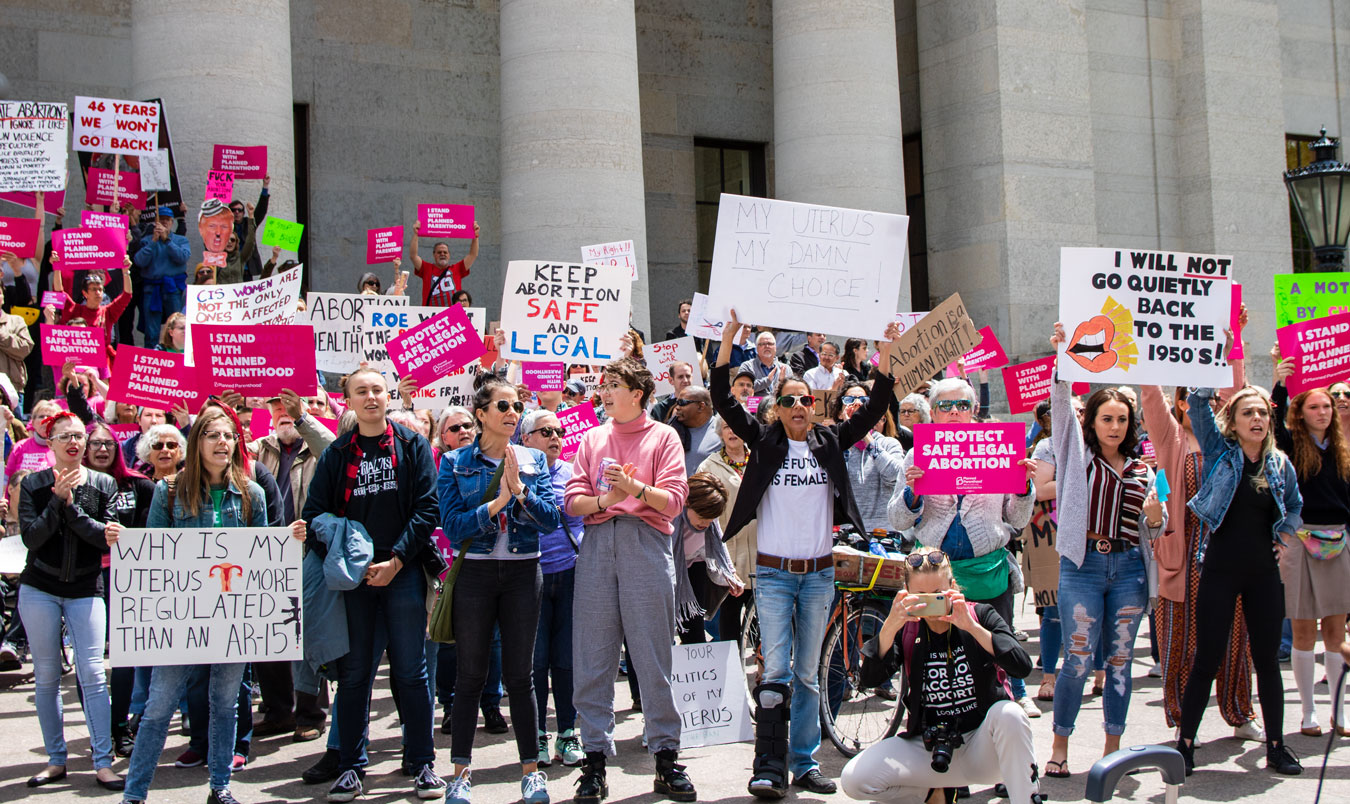
Demonstration in Columbus, Ohio

- Chicago, Illinois
- Fargo, North Dakota
- St. Paul, Minnesota

Participating cities in Iowa included Cedar Rapids and Des Moines.

In Indiana, there were protests in Fort Wayne and Indianapolis.

Michigan saw demonstrations in Ann Arbor, Detroit, Ferndale, and Lansing.

In Missouri, there were demonstrations in Jefferson City and St. Louis.

Wisconsin saw protests in Appleton and Eau Claire.

=== West ===
- Albuquerque, New Mexico
- Juneau, Alaska

California saw demonstrations in Los Angeles, San Francisco, San Jose, Oakland, Palo Alto, Fullerton, Irvine, Mission Viejo, San Clemente, San Diego, San Luis Obispo, Santa Barbara, and Sebastopol.

In Colorado, there were protests in Boulder and Fort Collins.

An event was also planned in Coeur d'Alene, Idaho.

Oregon saw demonstrations in Eugene and Portland.

In Washington state, there were demonstrations in Seattle, Spokane, and Yakima.

In Wyoming, a protest took place in Laramie.

== See also ==
- Abortion in the United States
  - Abortion in the United States by state
- United States abortion-rights movement
