= Abortion in Nebraska =

Abortion in Nebraska is mostly illegal after the 12th week of pregnancy.

On November 6, 2024, the Prohibit Abortions After the First Trimester Amendment passed with a 55% majority, which enshrined a ban on abortions after the first trimester in the Nebraska Constitution. It includes exceptions for rape, incest, and medical emergency, but allows the legislature to enact restrictions within the first trimester such as the current 12-week ban. Another competing measure, the Nebraska Right to Abortion Initiative, which would have enshrined abortion rights in the state constitution up until fetal viability, was rejected, with 51% of Nebraskans voting against.

A November 2022 Hart Research poll found that 59% of Nebraskans opposed further abortion restrictions, with 48% strongly opposed, while only 36% supported additional bans, revealing increased support for abortion rights across both rural and urban areas and all congressional districts compared to earlier polling. In a 2014 poll conducted by the Pew Research Center, 50% of Nebraskan adults said that abortion should be legal in all or most cases while 46% said abortion should be illegal in most or all cases. The 2023 American Values Atlas reported that, in their most recent survey, 51% of Nebraskans said that abortion should be legal in all or most cases.

The number of abortion clinics in Nebraska has dropped drastically in recent decades, with eight in 1982, nine in 1992 and three in 2014. There were 2,270 legal abortions in 2014, and 2,004 in 2015.

== History ==
=== Legislative history ===
Nebraska was one of 23 states in 2007 to have a detailed abortion-specific informed consent requirement. Mississippi, Nebraska, North Dakota and Ohio all had statues in 2007 that required specific informed consent on abortion but also, by statute, allowed medical doctors performing abortions to disassociate themselves with the anti-abortion materials they were required to provide to their female patients.

In 2010, Nebraska became the first state to use the disputed notion of fetal pain as a rationale to ban abortion after 20 weeks. In 2013, state Targeted Regulation of Abortion Providers (TRAP) law applied to medication induced abortions and private doctor offices in addition to abortion clinics.

In April 2022, LB933, the Nebraska Human Life Protection Act, failed 31–15, falling two votes short of the 33 votes needed to end a filibuster. If enacted, the trigger law would have outlawed abortion from conception with no exceptions should the US Supreme Court undo the Roe v. Wade decision, and only an affirmative defense in case of medical emergency.

In April 2023, LB626, the Nebraska Heartbeat Act, failed 32–15, falling one vote short of the 33 votes needed to end a filibuster. If enacted, the bill would have outlawed abortion at six weeks with exceptions for rape, incest, and medical emergency.

=== Judicial history ===
The US Supreme Court's decision in 1973's Roe v. Wade ruling meant the state could no longer regulate abortion in the first trimester.

In 1997, Nebraska enacted a law that prohibited "partial birth abortion", which it defined as any abortion in which the physician "partially delivers vaginally a living unborn child before killing the unborn child and completing the delivery." LeRoy Carhart, a Nebraska physician who specialized in late-term abortions, brought suit against Don Stenberg, the Attorney General of Nebraska, seeking declaratory judgment that the law was unconstitutional, based on the undue burden test mentioned by a dissenting opinion in City of Akron v. Akron Center for Reproductive Health and by the Court in Planned Parenthood v. Casey. Both a federal district court and the U.S. Court of Appeals ruled in favor of Carhart before the case was appealed to the Supreme Court as Stenberg v. Carhart in June 2000. The Court deemed the state's "partial-birth abortion" law unconstitutional on the basis that did not consider the life of the mother. 29 other states were impacted by this ruling.

In 2022, the Supreme Court overturned Roe v. Wade in Dobbs v. Jackson Women's Health Organization, No. 19-1392, 597 U.S. ___ (2022), allowing the state to impose more restrictive abortion legislation.)

=== Clinic history ===
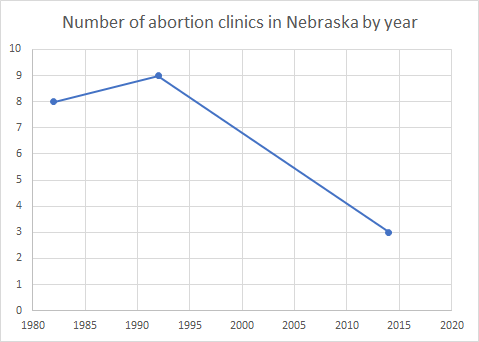
Number of abortion clinics in Nebraska by year

Between 1982 and 1992, the number of abortion clinics in the state increased by one, going from eight in 1982 to nine in 1992. In 2014, there were three abortion clinics in the state. That year, 97% of the counties in the state did not have an abortion clinic. That year, 41% of women in the state aged 15 – 44 lived in a county without an abortion clinic. In 2017, there were two Planned Parenthood clinics in a state with a population of 420,419 women aged 15 – 49 of which both offered abortion services.

== Statistics ==
In the period between 1972 and 1974, there were no recorded illegal abortion death in the state. In 1990, 175,000 women in the state faced the risk of an unintended pregnancy. Public opinion on abortion is divided. In 2014, 50% of adults said in a poll by the Pew Research Center that abortion should be legal while 46% believed it should be illegal in all or most cases. In 2017, the state had an infant mortality rate of 5.6 deaths per 1,000 live births.

Number, rate, and ratio of reported abortions, by reporting area of residence and occurrence and by percentage of abortions obtained by out-of-state residents, US CDC estimates
Location	Residence			Occurrence			% obtained by out-of-state residents	Year	Ref
Location	No.	Rate^	Ratio^^	No.	Rate^	Ratio^^	% obtained by out-of-state residents	Year	Ref
Nebraska	2,098	5.8	78	2,270	6.2	85	12.1	2014	
Nebraska	1,893	5.2	71	2,004	5.5	75	11.4	2015	
Nebraska	1,784	4.8	67	1,907	5.2	72	11.3	2016	
^number of abortions per 1,000 women aged 15–44; ^^number of abortions per 1,000 live births

== Abortion rights views and activities ==
=== Protests ===
Women from the state participated in marches supporting abortion rights as part of a #StoptheBans movement in May 2019. At a protest at the Nebraska Capitol in Lincoln, more than 350 people participated. Former state Sen. Brenda Council was among those taking part.

Following the overturn of Roe v. Wade on June 24, 2022, hundreds of abortion rights protesters rallied in Memorial Park in Omaha, Nebraska.

In Lincoln, Nebraska on February 1, 2023, about 300 abortion rights protesters rallied against a proposed abortion ban at the Nebraska State Capitol. On May 19, 2023, 6 people were arrested after abortion rights and LGBTQ rights protesters flooded the Nebraska State Capitol following the state legislature's passing of a bill banning abortion after 12 weeks and banning gender-affirming care for minors.

== Anti-abortion views and activities ==
=== Views ===
The non-partisan organization Nebraska Right to Life's ultimate stated goal is "to restore legal protection to innocent human life." At the same time, the president of the organization, Sandy Danek, has said that women who obtain abortions are themselves victims, stating, "We do not support any measures seeking to criminalize or punish a woman."

Abolish Abortion Nebraska has expressed that the state has "neglected justice" and "must repent," asserting that the same laws that protect the lives of born people should also protect human beings in the womb. They refer to the Bible and to Nebraska's state motto: "Equality before the law."

=== Activities ===
Bishop Fabian Bruskewitz excommunicated Catholics in his jurisdiction who were associated with Catholics for Choice in 1996, and the United States Conference of Catholic Bishops stated in 2000 that "[CFC] is not a Catholic organization, does not speak for the Catholic Church, and in fact promotes positions contrary to the teaching of the Church as articulated by the Holy See and the USCCB."

In 2004, Bruskewitz stated that he would deny the Eucharist to Catholic politicians who support abortion, including 2004 presidential candidate John Kerry.

=== Violence ===
In 1977, there were four arson attacks on abortion clinics. These took place in Minnesota, Vermont, Nebraska and Ohio. Combined, they caused over US$1.1 million in damage.

On August 29, 2009, two days after a nearby anti-abortion protest, an unknown arsonist threw a Molotov cocktail at a Planned Parenthood in Lincoln, Nebraska. The bomb fell short of the building, leaving no property damage or casualties.

== Sanctuary cities for the unborn ==
Eight cities in Nebraska have outlawed abortion within their city boundaries and declared themselves "sanctuary cities for the unborn." The village of Hayes Center, Nebraska, became the first city in Nebraska to outlaw abortion by local ordinance on April 6, 2021. The Hayes Center ordinance declares abortion to be "a murderous act of violence that purposefully and knowingly terminates a human life," and it outlaws abortion "at all times and at all stages of pregnancy." The only exception is for abortions performed "in response to a life-threatening physical condition aggravated by, caused by, or arising from a pregnancy" that "places the woman in danger of death or a serious risk of substantial impairment of a major bodily function unless an abortion is performed."

The city of Blue Hill, Nebraska, followed suit and enacted a similar ordinance outlawing abortion on April 13, 2021.

The village of Stapleton, Nebraska, enacted an ordinance outlawing abortion on August 8, 2022.

On November 8, 2022, citizens in five villages in Western Nebraska (Arnold, Paxton, Brady, Hershey, and Wallace) saw local abortion bans pass in each one of their communities.

Former Nebraska Governor Pete Ricketts (R) has praised the cities for their actions to outlaw abortion, issuing a statement that: "Nebraska is a pro-life state, and communities are working to recognize and protect innocent life in a variety of ways. The Biden-Harris Administration is pushing a radical, pro-abortion agenda, and Nebraska must do everything we can to stand against the abortion lobby."

== Failed legal challenge ==
In June 2023, a lawsuit was filed arguing that LB574 was unconstitutional because it violated the "one subject per rule by the Legislature" but has two different subjects - namely abortion and gender-affirming healthcare. The Nebraska supreme court rejected the claim and upheld the statute in July 2024.

== 2024 Abortion ballot initiative ==
On July 3, 2024, a group of reproductive rights activists turned in more than 207,000 signatures for the initiative, which is more than the 123,000 needed. The groups also claimed to fulfill the second requirement which is to have the signatures be "5% of registered voters in 38 of the state’s 93 counties." The group leading the initiative is Protect Our Rights. The Nebraska Secretary of State said they submitted the amount they did.

The measure, if passed, "would enshrine abortion rights in the state constitution up until fetal viability, or about the 24th week of pregnancy. The proposal includes exceptions beyond that time for a woman’s life and health." "Currently, abortion is illegal in Nebraska after the 12th week of pregnancy, with exceptions for rape, incest and saving the mother’s life. If voters passed the proposed amendment, it would effectively undo that law."

But despite this apparent success, the pro-choice groups still have several hurdles to get through. First, the signatures need to survive the challenges of opponents of the proposal. Second, this is not the only measure that may be before voters this November.

Another effort led by "the Nebraska Catholic Conference and Nebraska Right to Life, seeks to put to voters a proposed constitutional amendment that would ban abortion after the first trimester except in situations where the abortion is “necessitated by a medical emergency or when the pregnancy results from sexual assault or incest.” This measure turned in 205,000 signatures.

These measures on the ballot in November could potentially boost both Republican turnout, and Democratic turnout for competitive races such as the 2024 United States Senate Election in Nebraska and the United States House Election in Nebraska's Second Congressional District.

The results of the dual-referendums were a double victory for the pro life movement. Initiative 434, which sought to ban elective abortions during the second and third trimesters with exceptions for rape, incest, and medical emergencies, passed with approximately 55% of the vote, reinforcing the state's existing 12-week abortion ban and potentially paving the way for stricter regulations. On the other hand, Initiative 439, which proposed establishing a constitutional right to abortion until "fetal viability", was rejected with about 49% support. This constituted a moral victory for the pro-life movement because Initiative 434 had received more votes, effectively nullifying Initiative 439.
