= 2024 Nebraska Initiative 439 =

Proposed amendment to the Nebraska Constitution

- November 5, 2024
- Nebraska Right to Abortion Initiative; Shall the Nebraska Constitution be amended to include a new section which provides: “All persons shall have a fundamental right to abortion until fetal viability, or when needed to protect the life or health of the pregnant patient, without interference from the state or its political subdivisions. Fetal viability means the point in pregnancy when, in the professional judgment of the patient’s treating health care practitioner, there is a significant likelihood of the fetus’ sustained survival outside the uterus without the application of extraordinary medical measures."

Results
Choice	Votes	%
Yes	455,184	49.01%
No	473,652	50.99%
Valid votes	928,836	100.00%
Invalid or blank votes	0	0.00%
Total votes	928,836	100.00%
Registered voters/turnout	1,263,487	73.51%

No
80–90%
70–80%
60–70%
50–60%
Yes
70–80%
60–70%
50–60%

Nebraska Initiative 439, officially titled "Nebraska Right to Abortion Initiative", was a proposed constitutional amendment that appeared on the November 5, 2024 ballot in Nebraska. If passed, it would have amended the Nebraska Constitution to establish a right to abortion until fetal viability. It and Initiative 434 were mutually exclusive; the one with more votes in favor would become law in the event both amendments passed.

Initiative 439 failed after 51% of Nebraskan voters voted against it, with only 49% voting in favor. On the contrary, Initiative 434, an amendment that restricts abortion after the first trimester, passed with just under 55% voting in favor.

== Background ==
=== Legislative history ===
In April 2023, LB626, the Nebraska Heartbeat Act, failed 32–15, falling one vote short of the 33 votes needed to end a filibuster. If enacted, the bill would have outlawed abortion at six weeks with exceptions for rape, incest, and medical emergency.

Then, after LB626 failed in April, after Ben Hansen voted against LB626, he amended LB574 to add abortion. In May 2023, LB574, the Adopt the Let Them Grow Act, approved 33–15, was one vote above of the 33 votes needed to end a filibuster. Nebraska enacted a law banning most abortions after 12 weeks of pregnancy, with exceptions for cases of rape, incest, and to save the life of the pregnant person. This law replaced the previous 20-week abortion ban.

==== Nebraska Heartbeat Act vote ====
The bill was failed by the Senate on April 27 by a 32–15–2 vote. Senators Justin Wayne and Ben Hansen did not vote. Later, Ben Hansen modified his vote to yea.

Unicameral vote
Party	Votes for	Votes against	Not Voting
Democratic (17)	1: Mike McDonnell	15	1: Justin Wayne
Republican (33)	31	–	1: Ben Hansen
Total (49)	32	15	2

==== Adopt the Let Them Grow Act vote ====
The bill was approved by the Senate on May 19 by a 33–15–1 vote. Senator Justin Wayne did not vote.

Unicameral vote
Party	Votes for	Votes against	Not Voting
Democratic (17)	1: Mike McDonnell	15	1: Justin Wayne
Republican (33)	32	–	–
Total (49)	33	15	1

==== Aftermath ====
A November 2022 Hart Research poll found that 59% of Nebraskans opposed further abortion restrictions, with 48% strongly opposed, while only 36% supported additional bans, revealing increased support for abortion rights across both rural and urban areas and all congressional districts compared to earlier polling.

In response to this new restriction, citizens began a petition to place a constitutional amendment on the 2024 ballot that would protect abortion rights in Nebraska.

== Ballot measure ==
The proposed amendment would add the following text to Article I of the Nebraska Constitution:

All persons shall have a fundamental right to abortion until fetal viability, or when needed to protect the life or health of the pregnant patient, without interference from the state or its political subdivisions. Fetal viability means the point in pregnancy when, in the professional judgment of the patient's treating health care practitioner, there is a significant likelihood of the fetus' sustained survival outside the uterus without the application of extraordinary medical measures.

== Polling ==
Poll source	Date(s) administered	Sample size (Note: Key: A – all adults RV – registered voters LV – likely voters V – unclear)	Margin of error	For	Against	Undecided
SurveyUSA (Note: Poll sponsored by Split Ticket)	August 23–27, 2024	1,293 (RV)	± 3.5%	45%	35%	21%

== Results ==
Initiative 439
Choice	Votes	%
For	455,184	49.01
Against	473,652	50.99
Total	928,836	100.00
Source: Secretary of State of Nebraska

=== By congressional district ===
Despite losing the state, "Yes" won two of three congressional districts, which both elected Republicans.

District	Yes	No	Representative
1st	52%	48%	Mike Flood
2nd	59%	41%	Don Bacon
3rd	36%	64%	Adrian Smith

== See also ==
- 2024 United States ballot measures
- Abortion in Nebraska
- Initiatives and referendums in the United States

=== Other abortion referendums ===
- 2024 Nebraska Initiative 434
- 2022 Kansas abortion referendum
- 2022 California Proposition 1
- 2022 Michigan Proposal 3
- 2022 Vermont Proposal 5
- 2024 Arizona Proposition 139
- 2024 Colorado Amendment 79
- 2024 Florida Amendment 4
- 2024 Maryland Question 1
- 2024 Missouri Amendment 3
- 2024 Montana Initiative 128
- 2024 Nevada Question 6
- 2024 New York Proposal 1
- 2024 South Dakota Amendment G
- 2026 Idaho Proposition 1
- 2026 Missouri Amendment 3
- 2026 Nevada Question 6
- 2026 Virginia Question 1
