= Peter D. Hart =

American political consultant (born c. 1942)

- Born: c. 1942
- Education: Colby College (BA)
- Occupations: Democratic pollster, political analyst
- Political party: Democratic Party

Peter D. Hart (c. 1942) is a retired consultant and pollster who founded Hart Research, where he served as chairperson from 1971 to 2020.

== Early life and education ==
Hart received his BA at Colby College in 1964. He started his career in political polling under Louis Harris.

== Career ==
=== Hart Research ===
In 1971, Hart founded the firm Hart Research to measure public opinion.

Hart and his company have provided NBC News and The Wall Street Journal with polls since 1989. More than 55 U.S. senators and 40 governors, among them Hubert Humphrey, Lloyd Bentsen, Jay Rockefeller and Bob Graham, have been represented by Hart Research.

NGOs and institutions like Smithsonian Institution, the United States Holocaust Memorial Museum, Habitat for Humanity, the ACLU, the Bill and Melinda Gates Foundation and the Kennedy Center are clients of Peter D. Hart Research Associates, as well as corporations such as Boeing, Time-Warner, American Airlines, Coca-Cola, IBM, Fannie Mae, AT&T, and Tiffany & Co.

Hart retired as chairman following the 2020 presidential election.

=== Academia and media ===
Hart has lectured about public opinion and public policy at Duke University's Sanford Institute of Public Policy, the Annenberg School for Communication at the University of Pennsylvania, the University of California, Berkeley, and the Harvard Kennedy School.

Hart is frequently invited to major television programs, such as Meet the Press, The Today Show, and The NewsHour with Jim Lehrer, to discuss public policy issues.
