= 2012 Wyoming Amendment A =

Referendum in an American state

- November 6, 2012
- The adoption of this amendment will provide that the right to make health care decisions is reserved to the citizens of the state of Wyoming. It permits any person to pay and any health care provider to receive direct payment for services. The amendment permits the legislature to place reasonable and necessary restrictions on health care consistent with the purposes of the Wyoming Constitution and provides that this state shall act to preserve these rights from undue governmental infringement.

Results
Choice	Votes	%
Yes	181,984	76.98%
No	54,405	23.02%
Valid votes	236,389	94.29%
Invalid or blank votes	14,312	5.71%
Total votes	250,701	100.00%
Yes
80%–90%
70%–80%
60%–70%

Constitutional Amendment A is an amendment of the Wyoming Constitution enacted in 2012 to enshrine the right of individuals to make their own health care decisions. The amendment was passed principally in opposition to the Affordable Care Act (ACA).

== Background ==
The amendment was primarily sponsored by Wyoming State Senator Leslie Nutting (7th district) intended to prohibit people from being compelled to participate in the ACA. Opponents of the amendment said that the amendment would disallow healthcare access to many Wyoming residents, and that the amendment would have unintended consequences.

== Provisions ==
The amendment created a new Section 38 within Article 1 of the Wyoming constitution entitled "Right of health care access". Amongst other things, the amendment created the following line within the Wyoming Constitution:

Each competent adult shall have the right to make his or her own health care decisions.

— Wyoming Constitution, Excerpt of Article 1, Section 38

== Results ==
The following table details the results by county:

County	Yes		No	
County	#	%	#	%
Albany	9,984	64.25%	5,556	35.75%
Big Horn	4,244	83.33%	849	16.67%
Campbell	14,287	85.40%	2,443	14.60%
Carbon	5,022	81.26%	1,158	18.74%
Converse	5,092	83.43%	1,011	16.57%
Crook	2,954	85.03%	520	14.97%
Fremont	11,869	74.47%	4,068	25.53%
Goshen	4,209	76.24%	1,312	23.76%
Hot Springs	1,919	79.99%	480	20.01%
Johnson	3,381	82.54%	715	17.46%
Laramie	27,962	73.74%	9,958	26.26%
Lincoln	7,150	87.25%	1,045	12.75%
Natrona	22,691	74.81%	7,639	25.19%
Niobrara	962	80.10%	239	19.90%
Park	11,064	79.55%	2,845	20.45%
Platte	3,432	79.61%	879	20.39%
Sheridan	11,030	80.43%	2,684	19.57%
Sublette	3,463	83.45%	687	16.55%
Sweetwater	12,677	79.43%	3,283	20.57%
Teton	6,311	60.91%	4,050	39.09%
Uinta	6,567	79.61%	1,682	20.39%
Washakie	2,980	78.32%	825	21.68%
Weston	2,734	85.14%	477	14.86%
Total	181,984	76.98%	54,405	23.02%

== Impact on abortion ==
Following the US Supreme Court's decision in Dobbs v. Jackson Women's Health Organization overturning of Roe v. Wade in 2022, state legislatures were allowed to regulate any aspect of abortion. The Wyoming State Legislature passed HB92, a trigger law that would ban abortion beginning five days after the overturn of Roe v. Wade. The amendment had the unintended impact of allowing a lawsuit against HB92 that alleged that HB92 violated the state constitution by denying competent individuals the right to make their own health care decisions. On January 6, 2026, the Wyoming Supreme Court ruled abortion restrictions unconstitutional under said amendment, stating that "whether to terminate or continue a pregnancy is a woman’s own health care decision protected by Article 1, Section 38."
