= Justin Wayne (politician) =

American politician

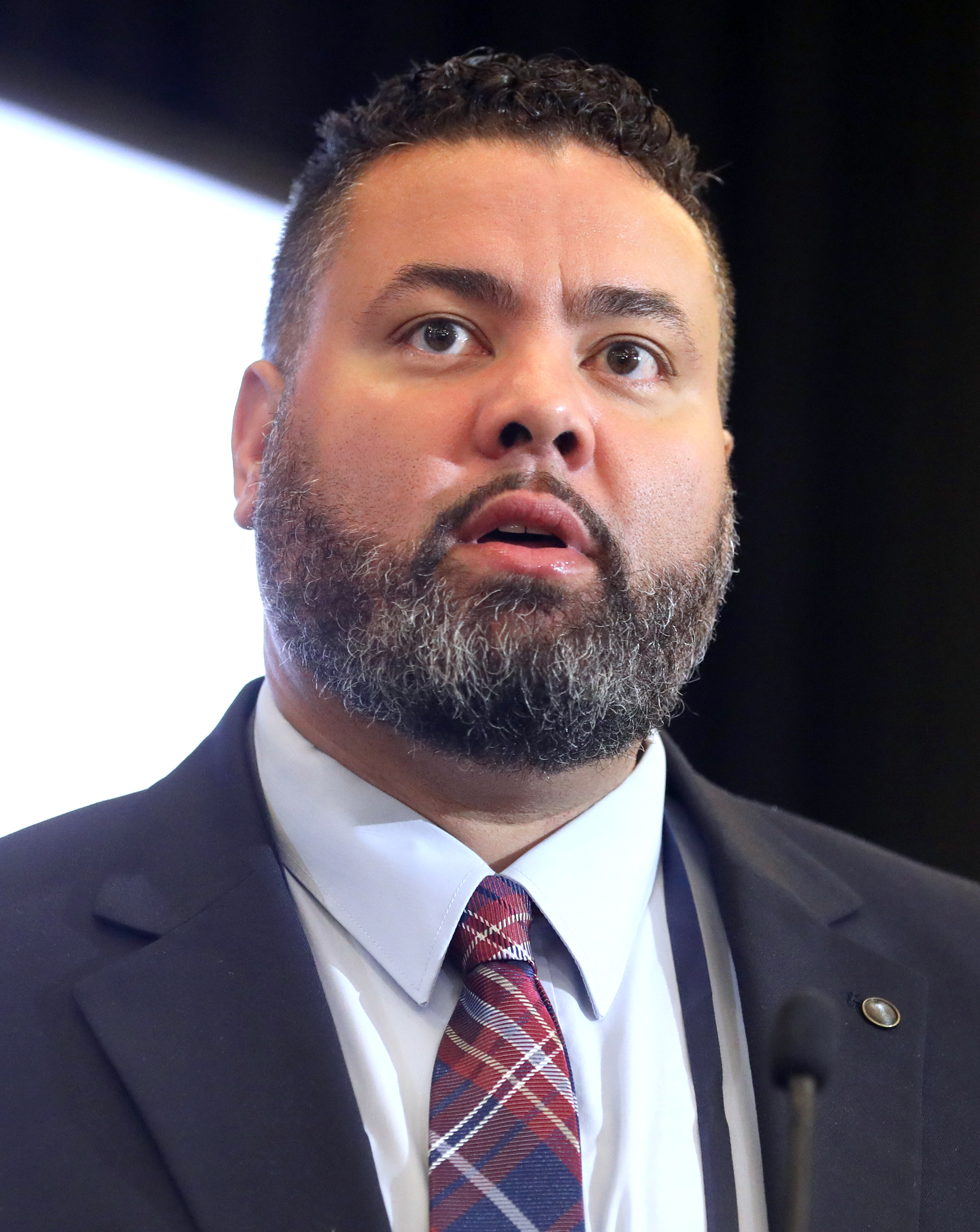
- Wayne in 2023

Member of the Nebraska Legislature from the 13th district
- In office January 4, 2017 – January 8, 2025
- Preceded by: Tanya Cook
- Succeeded by: Ashlei Spivey

Personal details
- Born: August 27, 1979 (age 47) Omaha, Nebraska
- Party: Democratic

Justin Wayne is an American lawyer, businessman, and politician from the state of Nebraska.

Wayne was elected to the Nebraska Legislature for District 13 in the 2016 Nebraska elections and served until the expiration of his second term 2025. Previously, he served as president of the board of Omaha Public Schools. He is a Democrat. He supports school choice.

Wayne served as the attorney for the family of James Scurlock, who was shot during the 2020 George Floyd protests in Nebraska.

== Early life and education ==
Wayne was born on August 27, 1979, in Omaha, Nebraska. He graduated from Omaha Northwest High School in 1998. He earned his B.S. from Creighton University in 2002 and his J.D. from the Creighton University School of Law in 2005. He has 4 younger siblings.

== Personal life ==
He is married and has two children.
