= 2026 United States ballot measures =

- April 21 to November 3, 2026

Part of the 2026 United States elections

The following ballot measures, initiated by legislators or citizens, were certified to appear on various states' ballots during the 2026 United States elections.

== By state ==
=== Alabama ===
Origin	Status	Measure	Description (Result of a "yes" vote)	Date	Yes	No
Legislature	Approved	Alabama Amendment 1, Allow Judges to Deny Bail for Certain Weapon Discharges and Solicitation, Attempt, or Conspiracy to Commit Murder Amendment	Remove the right of bail for the crimes of shooting or discharging a firearm, explosive, or other weapon into an occupied dwelling, building, railroad locomotive, railroad car, aircraft, automobile, truck, or watercraft, and for the solicitation, attempt, or conspiracy to commit murder.	May 19	689,987; 81.59%	155,652; 18.41%
Legislature	Approved	Alabama Amendment 2, Prohibit Diminishing District Attorney Compensation During Term of Office Amendment	Prohibit the reduction of a district attorney's compensation during their term in office.	May 19	474,083; 57.75%	346,823; 42.25%
Legislature	Approved	Alabama Amendment 1, Alabama Require Lieutenant Governor Vacancies to be Filled by Election Amendment	Amend the Alabama Constitution to require the office of lieutenant governor to be filled by election if a vacancy occurs more than 60 days before the next general election.	Nov 3	987,314; 65.41%	522,135; 34.59%
Legislature	Approved	Alabama Amendment 2, Alabama School District Consolidation Process Amendment	Amend the Alabama Constitution to establish a process for two or more public county school boards to combine into a single multi-county board of education.	Nov 3	759,519; 50.92%	732,169; 49.08%
Legislature	Approved	Alabama Amendment 3, Alabama Require Pledge of Allegiance and Allow Student-Led Prayer in Public Schools Amendment	Amend the Alabama Constitution to require public schools to recite the Pledge of Allegiance each day and to allow for student-led prayer.	Nov 3	974,660; 62.58%	582,925; 37.42%
Legislature	Approved	Alabama Amendment 4, Alabama Broadcast The Star-Spangled Banner in Public Schools Amendment	Amend the Alabama Constitution to require all public schools to broadcast or arrange for the performance of the first stanza of The Star-Spangled Banner at least once per week.	Nov 3	909,270; 58.53%	644,190; 41.47%

=== Alaska ===
Origin	Status	Measure	Description (Result of a "yes" vote)	Date	Yes	No
Citizens	Approved	Alaska Measure 1, Establish Campaign Contribution Limits for State and Local Elections Initiative	Establish new campaign contribution limits for campaigns for state and local office, limiting an individual's max contributions in an election cycle to $2,000 to candidates, $4,000 for a joint-lieutenant governor ticket, or $5,000 for a political party, with political parties allowed to contribute up to $4,000 for candidates and $5,000 to other parties or political groups.	Aug 18	117,962; 72.20%	45,418; 27.80%
Citizens	Failed	Alaska Measure 2, Repeal Alaska's electoral system of ranked-choice voting, nonpartisan blanket primaries, and campaign disclosure rules	Repeal Alaska Measure 2, eliminating the top-four primaries and ranked-choice voting general elections in Alaska, alongside the established campaign finance provisions requiring persons and entities contributing more than $2,000 derived from donations, contributions, dues, or gifts to disclose the true sources (as defined in law) of their political contributions.	Nov 3	127,041; 46.19%	148,008; 53.81%
Citizens	Approved	Alaska Measure 3, Citizenship Voting Requirement Initiative	Require that only United States citizens may be qualified voters in Alaska elections.	Nov 3	188,047; 68.23%	87,545; 31.77%

=== Arizona ===
Origin	Status	Measure	Description (Result of a "yes" vote)	Date	Yes	No
Legislature	Approved	Arizona Proposition 141, Prohibit Taxes or Fees on Miles Traveled in Motor Vehicle Amendment	Amend the state constitution to prohibit state and local governments from implementing any tax or fee based on vehicle miles traveled and enacting any rule or law to monitor or limit vehicle miles traveled without an individual's consent.	Nov 3	1,245,550; 50.99%	1,197,059; 49.01%
Legislature	Failed	Arizona Proposition 142, Prohibit Race- or Ethnicity-Based Preferential Treatment, Public Education Offices, and Disciplinary Policies Amendment	Prohibit the state and government agencies, including public education institutions, from requiring an individual to endorse preferential treatment toward or discrimination against an individual on the basis of race or ethnicity; using public funds to promote or to create or operate an office or position in a public education institution to promote preferential treatment toward or discrimination against a person or group based on their race or ethnicity; or requiring enrollment in a course that promotes the creation of a race-based diversity, equity, and inclusion or intersectionality in modern American society.	Nov 3	983,216; 40.07%	1,470,755; 59.93%
Legislature	Failed	Arizona Proposition 144, Voter Identification and Citizenship Voting Requirements Amendment	Specify that only citizens may vote in any election in Arizona, prohibit a foreign national from making contributions in an effort to influence an Arizona election, and prohibit others from knowingly accepting such contributions, require voters to provide government-issued identification to cast a ballot, and grant voters the right to have their vote tabulated at their voting location.	Nov 3	1,162,297; 46.69%	1,327,018; 53.31%
Legislature	Approved	Arizona Proposition 316, Limit Local Tax Rate on Groceries to 2% of Base Price and Require Voter Approval to Increase Tax Rate Measure	Prohibits local governments from imposing or increasing a tax on the sale of groceries without voter approval and capping the tax rate at 2%.	Nov 3	1,533,417; 62.08%	936,582; 37.92%
Legislature	Approved	Arizona Proposition 317, Designate Drug Cartels as Terrorist Organizations and Require State DHS to Address Threats Measure	Declares drug cartels to be terrorist organizations and requires the Arizona Department of Homeland Security do "everything within its authority to address the threat posed by drug cartels".	Nov 3	1,404,174; 56.15%	1,096,390; 43.85%
Legislature	Approved	Arizona Proposition 318, Require Schools and Athletic Associations to Restrict Use of Restrooms, Locker Rooms, and Other Private Spaces Based on Sex Measure	Prohibit schools and athletic associations from authorizing a student, athlete, employee, or other individual from using a restroom, locker room, shower room, or other private space that is not designated for their sex - with sex defined as the "biological status as male or female as recorded at birth on the individual's original birth certificate;"- and remove the provision allowing any student, including females, to participate in any interscholastic or intramural athletic team or sport designated for males.	Nov 3	1,459,944; 58.73%	1,025,836; 41.27%
Legislature	Approved	Arizona Proposition 319, Prohibit New Photo Traffic Enforcement Systems Measure	Prohibit the state, or other government entity, from using photo enforcement systems to identify people who violate certain traffic ordinances, including traffic signs, markings, signals, and speed restrictions.	Nov 3	1,543,597; 62.44%	928,371; 37.56%
Legislature	Failed	Arizona Proposition 320, Require Certain School Districts to Spend 60% of Operational Spending on Direct Instruction Measure	Require that large school districts (those with more than 7,500 students) spend at least 60% of their budget on direct instructional expenses, and state that the auditor general would be tasked with defining direct instructional expenses.	Nov 3	1,169,808; 48.10%	1,262,089; 51.90%

=== Arkansas ===
Origin	Status	Measure	Description (Result of a "yes" vote)	Date	Yes	No
Legislature	Approved	Arkansas Issue 1, Citizenship Requirement for Voting Amendment	Amend the state constitution to mandate that only U.S. citizens may vote in state or local elections.	Nov 3	598,443; 69.05%	268,198; 30.95%
Legislature	Approved	Arkansas Issue 2, Right to Keep and Bear Arms Amendment	Expand the constitutional right to keep and bear arms to include for lawful hunting and recreational use or other lawful purposes, without limitation on the possession and use of ammunition, firearm accessories, or firearm components stating that the right to keep and bear arms is "a natural, fundamental, and individual right that shall not be infringed".	Nov 3	615,045; 70.77%	254,035; 29.23%
Legislature	Failed	Arkansas Issue 3, Authorize Legislature to Create Programs for Economic Development Including Economic Development Districts Amendment	Amend the state constitution to allow the legislature to create programs, including Economic Development Districts, and make loans and grants of public money to achieve the purposes of unemployment prevention, real estate improvement, and economic, transportation, commerce, and real estate development.	Nov 3	420,434; 49.31%	432,168; 50.69%
Legislature	Approved	Arkansas Issue 4, Natural Resources Commission Bond Measure	Authorize the Arkansas Natural Resources Commission to issue up to $500 million in general obligation bonds to fund water-related infrastructure projects including water treatment and transportation, waste disposal, pollution abatement, drainage, irrigation, flood control, and wetlands and aquatic resources infrastructure.	Nov 3	477,237; 56.41%	368,772; 43.59%

=== California ===
Origin	Status	Measure	Description (Result of a "yes" vote)	Date	Yes	No
Citizens	Approved	California Proposition 1, Veteran and Housing Assistance Programs Bond Measure	Issue $11.25 billion in bonds to fund Multifamily Housing Program, CalVet Home Loan Program, and youth housing.	Nov 3	7,888,776; 61.19%	5,004,152; 38.81%
Citizens	Approved	California Proposition 2, Budget Stabilization Account Cap Increase and Gann Limit Changes Amendment	Increase the Budget Stabilization Account (BSA) cap from 10% of general fund revenue to 20% and excluding deposits into the BSA from the Gann Limit.	Nov 3	7,896,196; 61.30%	4,984,981; 38.70%
Citizens	Approved	California Proposition 3, Renew State Income Tax Increase for Education Funding Initiative	Amend the state constitution to indefinitely extend the top marginal tax rates set to expire in 2031 on single filers earning at least $361,000 or joint filers earning at least $721,000, with 89% of revenue allocated to K–12 schools and 11% to community colleges.	Nov 3	7,910,137; 60.85%	5,089,992; 39.15%
Legislature	Uncalled	California Proposition 4, Allow Public Financing of Election Campaigns Measure	Repeal the 1988 ban on public financing of campaigns and allow for state and local governments to create programs that provide candidates with public funds under spending limits and eligibility rules.	Nov 3	6,345,986; 49.84%	6,385,975; 50.16%
Legislature	Approved	California Proposition 5, Eliminate State Officer Recall Successor Elections Amendment	Amend the state constitution to eliminate the election of a successor when a state officer is recalled, thereby leaving the office vacant until it is filled according to state law; allowing for the recalled officer to run again for the same office at the special election, if one is held; and authorize the lieutenant governor to fill the gubernatorial vacancy until the expired term, unless the vacancy occurred before the close of the nomination period for the next statewide election during the first two years of the governor's term, in which a special election would be called and which the winner would serve the remainder of the term.	Nov 3	6,492,675; 51.94%	6,008,212; 48.06%
Citizens	Approved	California Proposition 37, Second Mortgage Homebuyer Program and Revenue Bond Initiative	Establish a second mortgage homebuyer program for qualified homebuyers on qualifying homes administered by the California Housing Finance Agency (CalHFA), and authorize the CalHFA to issue up to $25 billion in bonds to fund the program. The second mortgages would cover up to 17% of the home's price for those making a down payment of at least 3%.	Nov 3	8,019,057; 62.42%	4,827,530; 37.58%
Citizens	Approved	California Proposition 38, Establish Immunology and Immunotherapy Research Institute Initiative	Authorize the state to issue $8.4 billion in general obligation bonds to fund immunology and immunotherapy research; establish an Immunology and Immunotherapy Research Institute affiliated with the University of California; and award grants to California-based public and nonprofit medical research institutions for immunology and immunotherapy research.	Nov 3	6,928,343; 53.91%	5,923,463; 46.09%
Citizens	Failed	California Proposition 39, Voter Identification and Voter List Maintenance Requirements Initiative	Require voters to designate a government-issued ID when registering to vote, and to present that ID for in-person voting or provide the last four digits for mail-in ballots; require election officials to "maintain accurate voter registration lists [and]... use best efforts to verify citizenship attestations using government data" and to report each year the percentage of each county's voter rolls that have been citizenship-verified; require the State Auditor to audit government compliance with these requirements during odd-numbered years and report "findings and recommendations for improving the integrity of elections to the public."	Nov 3	5,160,993; 39.46%	7,916,821; 60.54%
Citizens	Failed	California Proposition 40, One-Time Wealth Tax for State-Funded Healthcare, Education, and Food Assistance Programs Initiative	Levy a one-time 5% tax on the accumulated wealth, including shares of capital stock, bonds or other evidences of indebtedness, and any legal or equitable interest, of billionaires in the state to fund state-funded health care programs, such as Medi-Cal, and state food assistance and public education.	Nov 3	6,277,798; 47.93%	6,819,576; 52.07%
Citizens	Failed	California Proposition 41, Prohibit Excluding New State Taxes from Spending Limit and Require Special Tax Audits Initiative	Require pre-election audits for ballot initiatives proposing special taxes once they report collecting 25% of signatures to be included in the voter information pamphlet if it qualifies for the ballot; require state laws or ballot initiatives levying a new special tax enacted after January 1, 2026, to undergo state audits every four years to determine program effectiveness and cost-saving measures; and prohibit the state from enforcing any tax that is exempted or excluded from the state spending limit enacted or effective on or after January 1, 2026.	Nov 3	5,754,021; 44.76%	7,101,834; 55.24%
Citizens	Approved	California Proposition 42, Prohibit New Taxes on Retirement Holdings, Personal Assets, and Savings and Limit Retroactive Taxes Initiative	Prohibit the enactment of new taxes after January 1, 2026, on ownership or control of retirement holdings, individually-owned assets, and other forms of personal savings, and retroactive taxes that result in a tax liability based on conduct, activities, or a status that occurred or were present prior to the effective date of the tax.	Nov 3	6,642,647; 51.17%	6,338,624; 48.83%
Citizens	Failed	California Proposition 43, Two-Thirds Vote Requirement for Local Special Tax Initiatives and Property Tax Initiative Prohibition Amendment	Closes court-created loophole by restoring the two-thirds voter approval requirement for special taxes under Proposition 13 to once again include special taxes placed on the ballot under the initiative power.	Nov 3	5,399,696; 42.29%	7,367,208; 57.91%
Citizens	Failed	California Proposition 44, Spending Requirements for Federally Qualified Health Centers Initiative	Require nonprofit Federally Qualified Health Centers (FQHCs) and FQHC Look-Alikes to spend at least 90% of their annual total revenue on expenses that advance the health center's mission.	Nov 3	2,507,675; 19.35%	10,450,985; 80.65%
Citizens	Failed	California Proposition 45, Expedited Environmental Review Process for Certain Projects Initiative	Make changes to the California Environmental Quality Act to establish deadlines for public agencies to complete environmental review and take required actions for projects deemed essential under the law, limit public agencies' existing requirement to consider a range of project alternatives to reduce environmental impacts, and change the court review process for project approvals by setting deadlines for filing and resolving lawsuits and limiting the evidence and relief the court can consider and order.	Nov 3	5,529,078; 43.52%	7,176,021; 56.48%

=== Colorado ===
Origin	Status	Measure	Description (Result of a "yes" vote)	Date	Yes	No
Citizens	Failed	Colorado Amendment 81, Colorado Notification of U.S. Department of Homeland Security for Certain Criminal Charges and Immigration Status Initiative	Amend the Colorado Constitution to require state and local law enforcement to notify the U.S. Department of Homeland Security after charging an individual when the individual is not lawfully present in the United States, or if their immigration status cannot be determined after a reasonable effort by law enforcement; and either the individual is charged with a crime of violence, as defined by law, or the individual has been convicted of a prior felony.	Nov 3	1,189,581; 44.67%	1,473,729; 55.33%
Citizens	Failed	Colorado Amendment 82, Colorado Right to Purchase and Sell Natural Gas for Cooking or Heating in Homes and Businesses Amendment	Amend the Colorado Constitution to grant consumers the right to purchase natural gas for cooking or heating in homes or businesses, and for distributors and utilities to sell natural gas to consumers.	Nov 3	1,219,835; 46.27%	1,416,541; 53.73%
Citizens	Failed	Colorado Amendment 83, Colorado Right to Hunt and Fish Initiative	Amend Colorado Constitution to provide right to hunt, fish, harvest, and to do so by use of "traditional methods" [undefined"]; to establish hunting and fishing as the "preferred means" [undefined] of managing fish and wildlife populations; to continue the state's authority to regulate hunting, fishing, wildlife management if "necessary" [undefined] for "sound scientific" [undefined] wildlife conservation and management, etc.	Nov 3	1,191,682; 45.14%	1,448,266; 54.86%
Citizens	Failed	Colorado Amendment 84, Colorado Require Voter Identification Number for Mail-In Ballots Initiative	Amend the Colorado Constitution to require voters casting ballots by mail to provide both their signatures and an identification number, with acceptable forms of identification including the last four digits of their Social Security number, a Colorado REAL ID number, a Colorado REAL ID driver's license number, or the last four digits of another Colorado identification number meeting federal REAL ID requirements.	Nov 3	976,251; 36.62%	1,689,988; 63.38%
Citizens	Failed	Colorado Amendment 85, Colorado Require Plain Language and Eighth-Grade Reading Level for Ballot Measures Initiative	Amend the Colorado Constitution to require ballot questions to be in plain language at no more than an eighth-grade reading level; and prohibit any state statute from mandating language preceding, following, or in a ballot title of a measure that is not in plain language or exceeds an eighth-grade reading level.	Nov 3	1,353,215; 51.15%	1,292,414; 48.85%
Citizens	Failed	Colorado Amendment 86, Colorado Require Commission and Supreme Court Approval for Mid-Decade Congressional Redistricting Initiative	Amend the Colorado Constitution to require any mid-decade redistricting plan to be approved by both the state's independent redistricting commission and the Colorado Supreme Court, and prohibit the approval of maps that have been "drawn purposefully to favor one political party."	Nov 3	1,214,977; 46.88%	1,376,887; 53.12%
Citizens	Approved	Colorado Amendment 87, Colorado Establish Graduated Income Tax and Dedicate New Revenue to Education, Healthcare, and Childcare Initiative	Establish a graduated income tax, ranging from 3.7% to 8.4%; remove the uniform tax rate requirement from the Taxpayer's Bill of Rights (TABOR); and allocate the revenue to the Colorado Future's Account, which funds K-12 public school education, health care, and early child care programs.	Nov 3	1,372,806; 51.72%	1,281,508; 48.28%
Citizens	Approved	Colorado Proposition 132, Penalties for Fentanyl Sale and Possession Initiative	Establish higher felony classifications and mandatory penalties for the manufacturing, dispensing, sale, and possession of fentanyl and certain synthetic opioids; require court-ordered treatment for certain low-level fentanyl possession felony offenses; and revise sentencing provisions to limit exceptions for fentanyl-related distribution offenses that result in death.	Nov 3	1,391,321; 52.64%	1,251,822; 47.36%
Citizens	Approved	Colorado Proposition 133, Require Life in Prison for Human Trafficking of Minors Measure	Require life in prison without parole or release for persons convicted of human trafficking a child for sexual servitude.	Nov 3	1,641,784; 62.13%	1,000,700; 37.87%
Citizens	Approved	Colorado Proposition 134, Sex Requirement for School and College Sports Initiative	Require student athletes to participate on men's or women's school and collegiate athletic teams that match their sex, defined as biological reproductive systems.	Nov 3	1,379,292; 52.16%	1,265,169; 47.84%
Citizens	Approved	Colorado Proposition 135, Prohibit Surgeries for Treatment in Response to Minors' Perception of Sex or Gender Measure	Prohibit healthcare professionals from performing or providing surgeries to persons under age 18 for the purpose of "treatment in response to a minor's perception of sex or gender" and prohibit the use of state or federal funds, Medicaid reimbursements, or insurance coverage to pay for such procedures.	Nov 3	1,373,951; 51.90%	1,273,608; 48.10%
Citizens	Failed	Colorado Proposition 136, Establish 4.4% Cap on Individual and Corporate Income Tax Rates Initiative	Establish a 4.4% cap on individual and corporate income tax rates, which are currently set at 4.4%.	Nov 3	1,230,920; 47.16%	1,379,204; 52.84%
Citizens	Approved	Colorado Proposition 137, Retain Sporting Goods Sales Tax Revenue for Conservation and Wildfire Prevention Fund Initiative	Allow the state to retain and spend sales tax revenue from sporting goods and equipment for water, land, forest, wildfire prevention, and outdoor recreation purposes rather than refunding the revenue under TABOR.	Nov 3	1,366,075; 52.00%	1,261,010; 48.00%
Legislature	Approved	Colorado Proposition NN, TABOR Revenue Cap Increase for K-12 Education Measure	Increase the TABOR cap and using surplus funds, equal to about $4.6 billion, for K-12 education expenses, such as educational programs, increasing teacher pay reducing teacher turnover, limiting the number of students in classrooms, and preparing students for the workforce.	Nov 3	1,514,375; 57.07%	1,139,218; 42.93%

=== Florida ===
Origin	Status	Measure	Description (Result of a "yes" vote)	Date	Yes	No
Legislature	Failed	Florida Amendment 1, Florida Changes to Budget Stabilization Fund Amendment	Amend the state constitution to increase the amount of funds that may be retained in the budget stabilization fund from 10% to 25% of net general revenue, require an annual transfer to the fund equal to $750 million or 25% of the general revenue collections (whichever is lesser), and allow for the legislature to suspend the transfer under certain conditions.	Nov 3	3,174,295; 40.90%	4,586,161; 59.10%
Legislature	Failed	Florida Amendment 2, Florida Exempt Tangible Personal Property Used for Agriculture or Agritourism from Property Taxes Amendment	Amend the state constitution to exempt tangible personal property, such as farm equipment or tools, from property taxes if the property is typically present on agricultural land, used for farming or agritourism activities, and owned by the landowner or leaseholder of the land.	Nov 3	4,547,646; 58.21%	3,264,960; 41.79%
Legislature	Approved	Florida Amendment 3, Homestead Tax Exemptions, Property Assessments, and Spending Restrictions Amendment	Increase the homestead tax exemption for non-school taxes to $150,000 in 2027 and $250,000 in 2028, with the amount indexed to inflation starting in 2029; provide that new residents receive a smaller exemption until they've lived in the state for five years; decrease the cap on how much the assessed value of non-homestead properties, such as rentals and commercial buildings, can increase each year from 10% to 5%, except for school district taxes; limit how counties and municipalities can spend property tax revenue on public safety, education, infrastructure, natural resource projects and flood control, local bonds, employee retirement benefits, and government operations; and other changes.	Nov 3	4,922,977; 61.98%	3,020,085; 38.02%

=== Georgia ===
Origin	Status	Measure	Description (Result of a "yes" vote)	Date	Yes	No
Legislature	Approved	Georgia Amendment 1, Increase Acre Limit for Agriculture and Timber Conservation Use Property Tax Classification Amendment	Increase the maximum amount of land that a single owner can enroll in Georgia's Conservation Use Valuation Assessment (CUVA) program—from 2,000 to 4,000 acres.	Nov 3	2,163,713; 53.85%	1,854,433; 46.15%
Legislature	Approved	Georgia Amendment 2, Georgia Require Nonpartisan Elections for Probate Judges Amendment	Require that all probate judges be elected on a nonpartisan basis.	Nov 3	2,752,872; 68.36%	1,274,297; 31.64%
Legislature	Approved	Georgia Amendment 3, Georgia Authorize Creation of Next Generation 9-1-1 Fund Amendment	Amend the state constitution to allow the state legislature to create and dedicate revenue to a fund titled the Georgia Next Generation 9-1-1 Fund.	Nov 3	3,135,317; 77.73%	898,237; 22.27%

=== Hawaii ===
Origin	Status	Measure	Description (Result of a "yes" vote)	Date	Yes	No
Legislature	Approved	Hawaii Question 1, Hawaii Increase Time for Senate to Act on Judicial Appointments Amendment	Increase the timeframe for the state senate to consider and act on appointments of judges and justices from 30 days to 60 days for appointments made between April 1 and December 31 when the senate is not in regular session or is soon to adjourn the regular session.	Nov 3	227,129; 63.03%	133,249; 36.97%
Legislature	Approved	Hawaii Question 2, Hawaii Legislative Authority to Authorize Counties and Municipalities to Issue Housing Infrastructure Growth Bonds and Exclude Them from Funded Debt Amendment	Amend the Hawaii Constitution to authorize the state legislature to empower the counties and municipalities of the state to issue housing infrastructure growth bonds for specified public works, public improvements, and community development.	Nov 3	242,255; 67.29%	117,758; 32.71%

=== Idaho ===
Origin	Status	Measure	Description (Result of a "yes" vote)	Date	Yes	No
Legislature	Failed	Idaho HJR 4, Grant Legislature Exclusive Authority and Prohibit Citizen-Initiated Measures on Marijuana, Narcotics, and Psychoactive Substances Amendment	Amend the state constitution to hold that only the Idaho State Legislature shall have the authority to legalize marijuana, narcotics, or other psychoactive substances and remove the ability for citizens to initiate state statutes that would legalize these substances.	Nov 3	240,865; 33.74%	473,007; 66.26%
Legislature	Approved	Idaho HJR 6, English as Official State Language Amendment	Amend the state constitution to designate English as the state's official language.	Nov 3	449,114; 63.13%	262,309; 36.87%
Citizens	Failed	Idaho Proposition 1, Idaho Reproductive Freedom and Privacy Act Initiative	Create a right to reproductive freedom and privacy, declaring that the state can regulate abortion after the point of fetal viability, except in cases of medical emergency, and stating that the government can not interfere with the following personal decisions about reproductive healthcare regarding childbirth care, contraception, fertility treatment, miscarriage care, and prenatal, pregnancy, and postpartum care.	Nov 3	320,257; 44.09%	406,136; 55.91%

Origin	Status	Measure	Description (Result of a "yes" vote)	Date	Winchester Model 1894 (.30-30);	Winchester Model 1873 (.44-40);	1873 Colt Single Action Army Revolver (.45 Colt);	M1 Garand rifle (.30-06);	Colt M1911 .45 automatic Colt pistol (.45 ACP); and	Remington Model 700 bolt-action rifle (.30-06).
Advisory Question	Decided	Idaho Official State Gun Question	Advise the state legislature as to which of the six possible guns should be the official state gun of Idaho.	Nov 3	134,244; 25.31%	165,147; 31.13%	80,894; 15.25%	37,633; 7.09%	46,511; 8.77%	66,019; 12.45%

=== Indiana ===
Origin	Status	Measure	Description (Result of a "yes" vote)	Date	Yes	No
Legislature	Approved	Indiana Public Question 1, Bailable Offenses and Substantial Risk Standard Amendment	Amend the Indiana Constitution to provide that offenses, other than murder or treason, are bailable "unless the accused poses a substantial risk to any other person or the community" if the presumption is strong and the state proves that no condition of release will protect the community.	Nov 3	1,053,551; 58.33%	752,672; 41.67%
Legislature	Approved	Indiana Public Question 2, Indiana Residency Requirements for City and Town Court Judges Amendment	Requires city and town court judges to reside in either the county where the court is located or the bordering county closest to the court.	Nov 3	1,132,631; 62.44%	681,263; 37.56%

=== Iowa ===
Origin	Status	Measure	Description (Result of a "yes" vote)	Date	Yes	No
Legislature	Approved	Iowa Amendment 1, Two-Thirds Legislative Vote Requirement for Income Tax Increase Bills Amendment	Amend the state constitution to require a two-thirds vote of both chambers of the state legislature to pass a bill that would increase the individual or corporate income tax rate or create a new income tax.	Nov 3	688,089; 56.21%	536,052; 43.79%

=== Kansas ===
Origin	Status	Measure	Description (Result of a "yes" vote)	Date	Yes	No
Legislature	Failed	Kansas Elections for Supreme Court Justices Amendment	Amend the state constitution to authorize the election of state Supreme Court justices, make justices' terms six years, and abolish the existing state Supreme Court nominating commission.	Aug 4	240,799; 38.64%	382,395; 61.36%
Legislature	Approved	Kansas Citizenship Voting Requirement Amendment	Amend the state constitution to state so that only a citizen of the United States is eligible to vote in state and local elections.	Nov 3	674,158; 63.58%	386,216; 36.42%

=== Kentucky ===
Origin	Status	Measure	Description (Result of a "yes" vote)	Date	Yes	No
Legislature	Approved	Kentucky Constitutional Amendment 1, Limit Governor's Pardon Power and Commutations Near General Election Amendment	Amend the state constitution to prohibit the governor from issuing a pardon or commuting a sentence 60 days prior to the gubernatorial election and up to the fifth Tuesday succeeding the election.	Nov 3	900,017; 70.68%	373,403; 29.32%

=== Louisiana ===
Origin	Status	Measure	Description (Result of a "yes" vote)	Date	Yes	No
Legislature	Failed	Louisiana Amendment 1, Legislative Authority to Add or Remove Unclassified Civil Service Positions Amendment	Amend the state constitution to allow the Louisiana State Legislature to add officers, positions, and employees to the unclassified civil service, such as transferring them from the classified to the unclassified civil service.	May 16	173,508; 21.58%	630,420; 78.42%
Legislature	Failed	Louisiana Amendment 2, St. George Community School System Authority Amendment	Amend the state constitution to add the St. George Community School System, located in East Baton Rouge Parish, to the list of school systems that are regarded and treated as parishes for purposes of operating a school system.	May 16	287,643; 33.98%	511,861; 64.02%
Legislature	Failed	Louisiana Amendment 3, Repeal Certain Education Funds and Dedicate Revenues to Teachers' Retirement System Amendment	Amend the state constitution to repeal the Education Excellence Fund, the Education Quality Trust Fund, and the Quality Education Support Fund, and instead apply the money in those funds to the Teachers' Retirement System.	May 16	340,399; 41.96%	470,903; 58.04%
Legislature	Failed	Louisiana Amendment 4, Allow Parishes to Exempt Business Inventory from Property Taxation Amendment	Allow for parishes to exempt business inventory from property taxes.	May 16	272,540; 33.92%	530,878; 66.08%
Legislature	Failed	Louisiana Amendment 5, Increase Judicial Retirement Age to 75 Years Amendment	Amend the state constitution to increase the judicial retirement age from 70 to 75.	May 16	188,782; 23.39%	618,183; 76.61%
Legislature	Approved	Louisiana Amendment 1, Louisiana One-Time Transfer of Disabled Veteran Homestead Tax Exemption for Surviving Spouses Amendment	Allow the surviving spouse of a disabled veteran to transfer the homestead property tax exemption one time to a new homestead.	Nov 3	1,071,826; 74.27%	371,408; 25.73%
Legislature	Failed	Louisiana Amendment 2, Louisiana Property Tax Rate Limits Based on Existing Voter-Approved Maximums Amendment	Authorize taxing authorities to levy a millage at a rate above the rate set by the previous year's assessment of the maximum amount of taxable property within each parish, but below the maximum permitted by the state constitution.	Nov 3	596,661; 41.97%	824,822; 58.03%
Legislature	Approved	Louisiana Amendment 3, Louisiana Prohibit Post-Conviction Bail for Individuals Convicted of Assault Against Minors Amendment	Prohibit post-conviction bail for a defendant who is convicted of an aggravated offense, as defined by law, against a victim who is a minor.	Nov 3	972,736; 67.80%	461,892; 32.20%
Legislature	Approved	Louisiana Amendment 4, Gubernatorial Two-Term Lifetime Limit Amendment	Amend the state constitution to provide for a lifetime term limit for the governor, with a maximum of two terms.	Nov 3	801,628; 55.93%	631,689; 44.07%
Legislature	Failed	Louisiana Amendment 5, Louisiana Removing Payment Order Requirement for State Retirement System Unfunded Liability Amendment	Amend the state constitution to remove the requirement that a state retirement system receiving nonrecurring state funds apply those funds to its oldest outstanding unfunded accrued liability (UAL) first.	Nov 3	526,857; 37.58%	875,010; 62.42%
Legislature	Approved	Louisiana Amendment 6, Louisiana Property Tax Exemption for Seniors Amendment	Amend the state constitution to authorize a property tax exemption up to $30,000 of assessed value, increasing with age, if an individual is at least 65 years of age and they already qualify for the income-based assessment freeze.	Nov 3	900,869; 63.56%	516,538; 36.44%
Legislature	Approved	Louisiana Amendment 7, Louisiana Use Public Funds for Drinking Water Utility Service Lines Amendment	Amend the state constitution to authorize the use of public funds for the maintenance of drinking water utility services lines affected by hazardous materials on property owned by utility customers.	Nov 3	924,800; 65.25%	492,532; 34.75%
Legislature	Approved	Louisiana Amendment 8, Louisiana Prohibit Property Expropriation by Foreign Adversaries Amendment	Amend the state constitution to prohibit the expropriation of property by foreign adversaries or agents of a foreign adversary, as defined by law.	Nov 3	877,480; 62.11%	535,197; 37.89%
Legislature	Approved	Louisiana Amendment 9, Louisiana Raise Income Limit to $150,000 for Special Property Tax Assessment Amendment	Raises the income limit to qualify for the property tax special assessment level—a provision that freezes the assessed value of a home for eligible homeowners so that their property taxes do not increase due to rising property values—from $100,000 to $150,000.	Nov 3	824,249; 58.19%	592,182; 41.81%
Legislature	Failed	Louisiana Amendment 10, Louisiana Tax Exemption for Rehabilitated Property Amendment	Amend the state constitution to authorize a tax exemption for derelict or blighted property, as defined by the state legislature, that has been rehabilitated.	Nov 3	659,489; 46.81%	749,487; 53.19%

=== Maryland ===
Origin	Status	Measure	Description (Result of a "yes" vote)	Date	Yes	No
Legislature	Approved	Maryland Question 1, Maryland Changes to Collective Bargaining for State Employees Amendment	Require the governor's budget to provide for expenditures for wages, hours, benefits, and other terms and conditions of employment, provided by a memorandum of understanding covering state employees, and provide for the statutory changes to collective bargaining for state employees, including requiring the selection of a neutral arbitrator and establishing a binding arbitration process.	Nov 3	1,601,556; 76.22%	499,619; 23.78%
Legislature	Approved	Maryland Question 2, Maryland Commission on Judicial Disabilities Vacancies Amendment	Amend the state constitution to authorize the chair of the Commission on Judicial Disabilities to appoint former members to temporarily fill vacancies or allow for the governor to appoint a substitute member or extend the term of an existing member.	Nov 3	1,444,126; 68.46%	665,241; 31.54%
Legislature	Approved	Maryland Question 3, Maryland Provide That Nothing in State Constitution Establishes Criteria for Congressional Redistricting Amendment	Amend the Maryland Constitution concerning congressional redistricting to provide that constitutional requirements for contiguity, compactness, substantially equal population, and consideration of natural and political subdivision boundaries apply only to state legislative districts, not congressional districts; to allow the General Assembly to grant the Supreme Court of Maryland original jurisdiction over challenges to congressional redistricting plans; and provide that the Maryland Constitution establishes no criteria for congressional district boundaries.	Nov 3	1,346,302; 62.06%	822,997; 37.94%

=== Massachusetts ===
Origin	Status	Measure	Description (Result of a "yes" vote)	Date	Yes	No
Citizens	Approved	Massachusetts Question 1, Public Records Requirements for Legislature and Governor’s Office Initiative	Make records held by the state legislature and the governor's office subject to the state's public records law, with the exceptions of documents related to the development of policy positions of legislators or the governor and communications between a legislator's office and their constituents concerning a constituent's access to government services.	Nov 3	2,204,578; 85.92%	361,194; 14.08%
Citizens	Approved	Massachusetts Question 2, Permit Collective Bargaining for Committee for Public Counsel Services Employees Initiative	Permit employees of the Committee for Public Counsel Services (CPCS) to participate in collective bargaining practices, and require the CPCS to request funding from the governor for agreements within 30 days after entering into a collective bargaining contract.	Nov 3	1,621,191; 64.00%	911,942; 36.00%
Citizens	Failed	Massachusetts Question 3, Top-Two Primary Elections Initiative	Create a single primary election in which all candidates would be listed on the same ballot for state elections, regardless of their political affiliation, with the two candidates that receive the most votes would advance to the general election.	Nov 3	1,001,405; 38.96%	1,568,783; 61.04%
Citizens	Approved	Massachusetts Question 4, Permit Same-Day Voter Registration Initiative	Permit same-day voter registration.	Nov 3	1,448,636; 56.37%	1,121,435; 43.63%
Citizens	Failed	Massachusetts Question 5, Change State Tax Revenue Limit Initiative	Change the method of calculating the state's tax revenue limit so that it is equal to the sum of the net amount of state revenue from the year prior and the average growth of wages and salaries in Massachusetts over the past three years, and add income tax revenue collected under Section 2BBBBBB of Chapter 29 of Massachusetts law to the state's definition of state tax revenue.	Nov 3	1,211,012; 47.70%	1,327,968; 52.30%
Citizens	Approved	Massachusetts Question 6, Establish the Nature for All Fund Initiative	Create a fund for state money, titled the Nature for All Fund, to be used to fund nature conservation efforts, and require, that before July 1, 2028, 50% of the tax revenue from the sale and use of sporting goods, recreational vehicles, and golf courses be placed in the fund; and that after July 1, 2028, 100% of such tax revenue be placed in the fund.	Nov 3	1,550,359; 60.83%	998,197; 39.17%
Citizens	Failed	Massachusetts Question 7, Limit on Required Lot Size for Single-Family Homes Initiative	Require that cities and towns allow single-family homes on residentially zoned lots that meet minimum standards of at least 5,000 square feet in area, at least 50 feet of frontage on a street or public way, and access to public sewer and water services.	Nov 3	1,257,965; 49.36%	1,290,650; 50.64%
Citizens	Failed	Massachusetts Question 8, Eliminate Recreational Marijuana Sales and Allow Limited Possession Initiative	Make the possession of up to two ounces of marijuana for people aged under 21 a civil offense, and repeal laws that allow the sale, regulation, and taxation of recreational marijuana, laws permitting the personal cultivation of cannabis in homes, alongside laws permitting the possession of up to one ounce of marijuana without penalties, and possession of up to two ounces of marijuana with civil penalties for people aged 21 or older.	Nov 3	633,754; 24.37%	1,967,131; 75.63%
Veto Referendum	Approved	Massachusetts Question 9, Firearm Regulations Referendum	Uphold House Bill 4885, which enacted several changes to the state's firearm regulations including: developing an electronic tracking system; prohibiting assault-style firearms (as defined in law); requiring safety certificates to obtain firearm permits; mandating serial numbers for firearms; allowing school administrators and licensed healthcare providers to request that a court issue an Extreme Risk Protection Order; and permitting courts to order firearm surrender when issuing Harassment Prevention Orders.	Nov 3	1,758,691; 67.34%	852,895; 32.66%

=== Michigan ===
Origin	Status	Measure	Description (Result of a "yes" vote)	Date	Yes	No
Automatic ballot referral	Failed	Michigan Proposal 1, Constitutional Convention Question	Hold a state Constitutional Convention.	Nov 3	1,118,860; 26.25%	3,144,061; 73.75%
Citizens	Approved	Michigan Proposal 2, Utility and Government Contractor Campaign Finance Regulations	Prohibit regulated electric and gas companies, and closely connected individuals, from making campaign contributions to individuals running or holding government offices that would impact them.	Nov 3	3,530,720; 81.14%	820,563; 18.86%

=== Minnesota ===
Origin	Status	Measure	Description (Result of a "yes" vote)	Date	Yes	No
Legislature	Approved	Minnesota Alter Management and Investment Policies for Permanent School Fund Amendment	Amend the constitution to change the administrative policies surrounding the investment and distribution of the Minnesota Permanent School Fund, specifically to state that the management of the fund would need to preserve the purchasing power of the fund over time.	Nov 3	2,069,120; 75.63%	666,739; 24.37%

=== Missouri ===
Origin	Status	Measure	Description (Result of a "yes" vote)	Date	Yes	No
Automatic Ballot Referral	Approved	Missouri Amendment 1, Sales Tax for Parks and Conservation Amendment	Renew the existing sales and use tax of 0.1% for 10 years to fund state parks and soil and water conservation programs.	Aug 4	1,141,865; 82.29%	245,778; 17.71%
Legislature	Approved	Missouri Amendment 2, Require Election of Jackson County Assessor Amendment	Make the Jackson County Assessor an elected position by removing the constitutional exemption that currently allows the county to appoint the assessor.	Aug 4	1,042,413; 76.92%	312,713; 23.08%
Legislature	Failed	Missouri Amendment 4, Require Congressional District Approval for Initiated Constitutional Amendments, Prohibit Foreign Contributions, and Penalize Petition Fraud Amendment	Require the majority of voters from each congressional district to approve initiative petitions to amend the constitution, prohibit foreign nationals from contributing to ballot measure campaigns, among other provisions.	Aug 4	275,040; 19.68%	1,122,748; 80.32%
Legislature	Failed	Missouri Amendment 5, Income Tax Elimination and Sales Tax Changes Amendment	Amend the state constitution to reduce the state individual income tax, based on revenue growth, until the tax is eliminated; reduce personal property and other local taxes when local revenues increase, while prohibiting reductions in funding for public schools; prohibit future state individual income taxes once eliminated; and limit expansions of sales and use taxes, unless they are used to reduce income tax.	Aug 4	233,309; 16.68%	1,165,085; 83.32%
Legislature	Failed	Missouri Amendment 3, Prohibit Abortion and Gender Transition Procedures for Minors Amendment	Repeal Amendment 3, which enshrined abortion as a constitutional right up to fetal viability, and prohibit abortion, except in cases of medical emergency, fetal anomaly, rape, or incest, with cases of rape and incest only able to have an abortion performed before 12 weeks; Require parental consent for a minor seeking an abortion, except in cases of medical emergency where consent cannot be obtained; Prohibit fetal organ harvesting after an abortion - defined as the collection of fetal tissue, organs, or fluids for the purpose of selling or collecting for scientific purposes - except for paternity testing, determination of anomaly or condition of the unborn child, or for law enforcement purposes; Provide that women can access healthcare in cases of miscarriages and ectopic pregnancies; Provide for the general assembly to enact laws and regulations regarding the provision of abortions, abortion facilities, and abortion providers; and prohibit gender transition surgeries for minors under eighteen, and prohibit the prescribing of cross-sex hormones or puberty blocking drugs to minors under eighteen for the purposes of gender transition.	Nov 3	965,155; 45.07%	1,176,323; 54.93%
Citizens	Approved	Missouri Amendment 6, Initiative and Referendum Powers and Legislative Change Requirements Amendment	Prohibit the legislature from repealing or amending a citizen initiative unless eighty percent of both chambers of the legislature refer the changes to the next statewide ballot for approval by the electorate, and would prohibit the legislature from making changes to the citizen initiative and referendum process.	Nov 3	1,254,079; 59.93%	838,630; 40.07%
Legislature	Failed	Missouri Amendment 7, State Investment Fund Amendment	Create a permanent public endowment fund managed by the state to generate revenue, and using the earnings to eliminate state-imposed taxes when sufficient to replace them.	Nov 3	818,563; 39.49%	1,254,399; 60.51%
Legislature	Approved	Missouri Amendment 8, Require Election of County Sheriffs Amendment	Require the election of county sheriffs in most counties, establishing sheriffs as the chief law enforcement officers in those counties, and limiting the removal of sheriffs from office.	Nov 3	1,056,870; 50.99%	1,016,026; 49.01%
Veto Referendum	Failed	Missouri Proposition A, Missouri Congressional Map Referendum	Uphold House Bill 1, which provided for new congressional districts.	Nov 3	788,815; 38.17%	1,278,021; 61.83%

=== Montana ===
Origin	Status	Measure	Description (Result of a "yes" vote)	Date	Yes	No
Citizens	Approved	Montana CI-132, Require Nonpartisan Judicial Elections Initiative	Amend the state constitution to provide that judicial elections remain nonpartisan.	Nov 3	328,015; 68.22%	152,827; 31.78%
Citizens	Approved	Montana CI-133, Add Right to Initiative and Referendum Power to Declaration of Rights Amendment	Amend the state constitution to add the initiative and referendum power to the state's Declaration of Rights; require any government abridgment of the right to meet the judicial standard of strict scrutiny; and provide that the initiative process is "impartial, predictable, transparent, and expeditious."	Nov 3	308,473; 65.41%	163,128; 34.59%
Citizens	Approved	Montana I-194, Exclude Political Spending from Artificial Persons’ Charter Powers Initiative	Prohibit artificial persons, including nonprofits, trusts, partnerships, corporations, trade associations, or unincorporated associations, and all entities doing business in Montana, from contributing to campaigns, ballot measure elections, or political parties.	Nov 3	307,041; 65.57%	161,247; 34.43%

=== Nebraska ===
Origin	Status	Measure	Description (Result of a "yes" vote)	Date	Yes	No
Legislature	Failed	Nebraska Constitutional Amendment 1, Change State Legislative Term Limits from Two to Three Consecutive Terms Amendment	Amend the state constitution to change the term limit for state legislators from two consecutive terms (eight years) to three consecutive terms (12 years).	Nov 3	136,438; 18.63%	595,827; 81.37%
Citizens	Failed	Nebraska Initiative Measure 440, Allow Laws Authorizing Online Sports Wagering Constitutional Amendment	Amend the state constitution to authorize laws to govern sports betting.	Nov 3	338,312; 44.84%	416,114; 55.16%
Citizens	Failed	Nebraska Initiative Measure 441, Allow and Regulate Online Sports Wagering Initiative	Authorize online sports betting in the state and authorizing the state gaming commission to adopt rules and regulations governing the gaming operators.	Nov 3	341,436; 45.51%	408,765; 54.49%
Citizens	Approved	Nebraska Initiative Measure 442, Sex Requirement for School and College Sports Initiative	Amend the state constitution to require schools to “designate each athletic team or sport as one of the following based on biological sex”: male, female, or coed, and prohibit students of the male sex from participating on teams or in sports designated for females.	Nov 3	502,890; 67.72%	239,744; 32.28%

=== Nevada ===
Origin	Status	Measure	Description (Result of a "yes" vote)	Date	Yes	No
Citizens	Approved	Nevada Question 6, Right to Abortion Initiative	Reaffirm Question 6, which would amend the state constitution to provide for a state constitutional right to an abortion, and for the state to regulate abortion after fetal viability, except where medically indicated to "protect the life or health of the pregnant patient".	Nov 3	672,972; 63.51%	386,709; 36.49%
Citizens	Approved	Nevada Question 7, Require Voter Identification Initiative	Amend the state constitution to require that Nevada residents present a form of photo identification to verify their identity while voting in person, or to verify their identity using the last four digits of their driver's license or Social Security number when voting by mail.	Nov 3	663,411; 62.17%	403,686; 37.83%

=== New Hampshire ===
Origin	Status	Measure	Description (Result of a "yes" vote)	Date	Yes	No
Legislature	Failed	New Hampshire Abolish Office of Register of Probate Amendment	Eliminate the register of probate offices and references to it within the New Hampshire Constitution.	Nov 3	366,633; 64.77%	199,425; 35.23%

=== New Mexico ===
Origin	Status	Measure	Description (Result of a "yes" vote)	Date	Yes	No
Legislature	Approved	New Mexico Constitutional Amendment 1, Eliminate Governor's Pocket Veto and Require Veto Explanations Amendment	Amend the state constitution to require bills to become law if the governor does not sign or veto them within the required timeframe, eliminate the governor's pocket veto, and require the governor to provide a substantive explanation for vetoes.	Nov 3	497,687; 75.08%	165,231; 24.92%
Legislature	Approved	New Mexico Constitutional Amendment 2, Repeal Separate Election Requirement for School Election Dates Amendment	Repeal the constitutional provision requiring that school elections be held at different times from partisan elections, thus allowing school elections to be held on the same dates as partisan elections, such as statewide and federal elections.	Nov 3	426,681; 64.82%	231,606; 35.18%
Legislature	Approved	New Mexico Constitutional Amendment 3, Board of Regents Nominating Committees Amendment	Make changes to the Board of Regents including establishing nominating committees to provide lists of candidates; provide that student members are appointed from a list provided by student governing body, and; prohibit non-student members from changing political party twelve months preceding appointment.	Nov 3	444,925; 69.96%	191,082; 30.04%
Legislature	Approved	New Mexico Constitutional Amendment 4, Establish Salary for State Legislators Amendment	Establish a salary for state legislators equal to the annual median household income of the state.	Nov 3	418,365; 63.46%	240,923; 36.54%
Bond Issue	Approved	New Mexico Bond Question 1, Senior Citizen Facilities Bond Issue	Authorize $30 million in general obligation bonds for senior citizen facility improvement, construction, and equipment acquisition projects, funded by a statewide property tax.	Nov 3	453,713; 69.63%	197,922; 30.37%
Bond Issue	Approved	New Mexico Bond Question 2, Library Acquisition Bond Issue	Authorize up to $20 million in general obligation bonds for academic, public school, tribal, and public library resource acquisitions, funded by a statewide property tax.	Nov 3	427,457; 65.98%	220,364; 34.02%
Bond Issue	Approved	New Mexico Bond Question 3, Higher Education Improvements Bond Issue	Authorize up to $230 million in general obligation bonds for capital improvements and acquisitions at higher education institutions, special schools, and tribal schools, funded by a statewide property tax.	Nov 3	415,878; 64.29%	230,980; 35.71%

=== North Carolina ===
Origin	Status	Measure	Description (Result of a "yes" vote)	Date	Yes	No
Legislature	Approved	North Carolina Require Voter Identification Amendment	Amend the state constitution to require photo identification to vote for all voters, not just those voting in person.	Nov 3	2,474,609; 59.61%	1,676,587; 40.39%
Legislature	Approved	North Carolina Reduce Income Tax Rate Cap from 7% to 3.5% Amendment	Amend the state constitution to reduce the maximum allowable income tax rate from 7% to 3.5%.	Nov 3	2,571,388; 61.93%	1,580,808; 38.07%
Legislature	Approved	North Carolina Property Tax Levy Limit Amendment	Amend the state constitution to require the state legislature to pass laws limiting the amount that property taxes may increase.	Nov 3	2,503,667; 60.42%	1,640,182; 39.58%

=== North Dakota ===
Origin	Status	Measure	Description (Result of a "yes" vote)	Date	Yes	No
Legislature	Approved	North Dakota Constitutional Measure 1, Single-Subject Requirement for Constitutional Amendments Measure	Creates a single-subject requirement for citizen initiated and legislatively referred constitutional amendments and prohibits the secretary of state from approving an initiative for circulation if the initiative is determined to include more than one subject.	Jun 9	77,072; 66.43%	38,955; 33.57%
Legislature	Failed	North Dakota Constitutional Measure 1, 60% Vote Requirement for Constitutional Amendments Measure	Requires citizen initiated or legislatively referred constitutional amendments to receive a 60% vote to be adopted.	Nov 3	101,798; 43.51%	132,169; 56.49%
Citizens	Failed	North Dakota Constitutional Measure 2, Require Schools to Provide Free Meals to Students	Requires public schools to provide one free breakfast and one free lunch to students.	Nov 3	116,477; 49.40%	119,309; 50.60%

=== Ohio ===
Origin	Status	Measure	Description (Result of a "yes" vote)	Date	Yes	No
Legislature	Approved	Ohio Issue 3, Require Voter Identification Amendment	Amend the Ohio constitution to require a photo ID to vote.	Nov 3	2,934,973; 65.34%	1,557,092; 34.66%

=== Oklahoma ===
Origin	Status	Measure	Description (Result of a "yes" vote)	Date	Yes	No
Citizens	Failed	Oklahoma State Question 832, $15 Minimum Wage Initiative	Increases the minimum wage to $12 in 2027, $13.50 per hour in 2028, $15 per hour in 2029, and adjusting future increases based on changes to inflation. Remove certain exceptions from the Oklahoma Minimum Wage Act that did not include certain workers (such as part-time employees, students, minors, farm and agricultural workers, domestic service workers, newspaper vendors and carriers, and feedstore employees) in the definition of 'employee'.	Jun 16	281,386; 44.63%	349,102; 55.37%
Legislature	Failed	Oklahoma State Question 844, Require Legislature to Establish Tax Revenue Reimbursement Methodology Amendment	Require the state legislature to establish a set methodology for determining reimbursement amounts for local governments and districts for revenues lost due to a statewide manufacturing tax exemption.	Aug 25	138,814; 26.26%	389,886; 73.74%
Legislature	Approved	Oklahoma State Question 846, Voter Identification Requirement Amendment	Create a constitutional requirement for voters to provide proof of identity when voting in any election in the state, and allowing the state legislature to define proof of identity.	Aug 25	292,599; 54.61%	243,159; 45.39%
Legislature	Failed	Oklahoma State Question 845, Changes to Judicial Nominating Commission Amendment	Amend the state constitution to mandate the Judicial Nominating Commission require all appointments be made according to congressional districts at the time of the appointment, allow for commissioners to serve two consecutive six-year terms, and remove the provision limiting the commission from having more than three members from one political party.	Nov 3	294,462; 27.48%	777,246; 72.52%
Legislature	Failed	Oklahoma State Question 847, Reduce Annual Increases in Property Values for Tax Calculations Amendment	Amend the state constitution to change the calculation of the fair cash value of property starting in tax year 2027 by: reducing the annual growth limit of the calculated fair cash value of property from 5% to 4%; reducing the annual growth limit of the calculated fair cash value of property that qualifies for a homestead exemption from 3% to 1.75%; and repealing the prohibition on any increase in fair cash value of homestead property for those aged sixty-five or older whose income exceeds the median amount determined by the U.S. Department of Housing and Urban Development.	Nov 3	493,467; 45.73%	585,734; 54.27%

=== Oregon ===
Origin	Status	Measure	Description (Result of a "yes" vote)	Date	Yes	No
Veto Referendum	Failed	Oregon Referendum 120, Increase to Gas Tax, Payroll Tax, and Vehicle Registration Fees Referendum	Uphold targeted sections of House Bill 3991 (HB 3991), which increase the state's gas tax from $0.40 to $0.46, payroll tax for transportation from 0.1% to 0.2%, and vehicle registration fees.	May 19	207,066; 16.98%	1,012,663; 83.02%

=== Rhode Island ===
Origin	Status	Measure	Description (Result of a "yes" vote)	Date	Yes	No
Legislative	Approved	Rhode Island Question 1, Higher Education Bond Measure	Issue $275 million in bonds to fund the construction and improvement of higher education facilities, including $165 million in bonds to fund the construction of a new integrated health building for the University of Rhode Island, $60 million in bonds to fund the construction of a workforce innovation center at the Community College of Rhode Island, Warwick campus, and $50 million in bonds to fund the construction of a student success and career readiness center at Rhode Island College.	Nov 3	209,091; 60.02%	139,296; 39.98%
Legislative	Approved	Rhode Island Question 2, Housing Development Bond Measure	Issue $120 million in bonds to fund the construction and development of affordable housing projects.	Nov 3	213,164; 61.34%	134,348; 38.66%
Legislative	Failed	Rhode Island Question 3, Economic and Infrastructure Development Bond Measure	Issue $100 million in bonds to fund infrastructure and economic development projects, including $55 million in bonds to fund site development and infrastructure improvements and $45 million in bonds to fund infrastructure improvements to support the state's oceans.	Nov 3	162,899; 47.70%	178,636; 52.30%
Legislative	Failed	Rhode Island Question 4, Historical Center and Cultural Grants Bond Measure	Issue $50 million in bonds to fund cultural and historical projects, including $45 million in bonds to fund the construction of a new Rhode Island State History Center, and $5 million in bonds to fund matching grants administered by the Rhode Island Historical Preservation and Heritage Commission.	Nov 3	170,361; 49.40%	174,502; 50.60%
Legislative	Approved	Rhode Island Question 5, Environment and Watershed Protection and Development Bond Measure	Issue $55 million in bonds to fund environmental preservation and water infrastructure projects, including $25 million in bonds to provide financial assistance to local government for water infrastructure improvements, $12 million in bonds to fund the renovation, repair, and construction of existing and new recreational facilities, $7 million in bonds to fund Narragansett Bay and state watershed restoration and water quality protection, $3 million in bonds to fund grants for non-profit brownfield remediation projects, $3 million in bonds to fund agricultural land preservation, $3 million in bonds to fund the acquisition of open space, watershed, and recreational lands, $1 million in bonds to fund grants for local recreation projects, and $1 million in bonds to fund asset protection and emergency repair for marine infrastructure.	Nov 3	232,598; 67.10%	114,023; 32.90%

=== South Dakota ===
Origin	Status	Measure	Description (Result of a "yes" vote)	Date	Yes	No
Legislative	Failed	South Dakota Constitutional Amendment I, Medicaid Expansion Conditioned on 90% Federal Funding Amendment	Amend the state constitution to remove the state's obligation to provide Medicaid funding if federal funding for the program falls below 90% of the programs cost.	Nov 3	131,202; 44.23%	165,420; 55.77%
Legislative	Approved	South Dakota Constitutional Amendment J, Citizenship Voting Requirement Amendment	Amend the state constitution to mandate that only U.S. citizens are eligible to vote in state and local elections.	Nov 3	183,765; 61.52%	114,928; 38.48%
Legislative	Approved	South Dakota Constitutional Amendment K, Creation of Unclaimed Property Trust Fund Amendment	Amend the state constitution to establish a trust fund for unclaimed property.	Nov 3	178,578; 60.94%	114,481; 39.06%
Legislative	Failed	South Dakota Constitutional Amendment L, 60% Vote Requirement for Constitutional Amendments Measure	Require constitutional amendments to be approved by 60% of voters.	Nov 3	126,175; 42.41%	171,362; 57.59%

=== Tennessee ===
Origin	Status	Measure	Description (Result of a "yes" vote)	Date	Yes	No
Legislative	Approved	Tennessee Amendment 1, Remove Right to Bail for Certain Criminal Offenses Measure	Amend the state constitution to remove the right to bail in cases where the presumption of guilt is great and the defendant is accused of acts of terrorism, second-degree murder, aggravated rape of a child, grave torture, or any other offense for which a convicted individual could not be released prior to the expiration of at least 85% of their sentence.	Nov 3	1,337,370; 67.18%	653,480; 32.82%
Legislative	Approved	Tennessee Amendment 2, Prohibit State Property Taxes Measure	Amend the state constitution to prohibit the legislature from enacting taxes on property.	Nov 3	1,340,459; 66.77%	667,080; 33.23%
Legislative	Approved	Tennessee Amendment 3, Marsy's Law Crime Victims' Rights Measure	Replaces the existing list of rights for victims of crimes in the state constitution with a new list, including the rights to be present at all criminal proceedings, to be free from harassment, intimidation, and abuse throughout the criminal justice system, to be provided reasonable notice of all public criminal proceedings, to have the safety of the victim, the victim's family, and the general public considered before any parole decision is made, and to be treated with fairness to be heard in any proceeding involving release, plea, sentencing, disposition, and parole among other rights.	Nov 3	1,533,214; 76.08%	482,034; 23.92%

=== Utah ===
Origin	Status	Measure	Description (Result of a "yes" vote)	Date	Yes	No
Legislative	Approved	Utah Constitutional Amendment A, Publication Requirements for Constitutional Amendments Measure	Amend the state constitution to require that constitutional amendments be published, in a manner provided by the legislature, for 60 days immediately before the next general election.	Nov 3	610,158; 61.12%	388,109; 38.88%
Legislative	Failed	Utah Constitutional Amendment B, 60% Vote Requirement for Ballot Initiatives to Increase or Expand Taxes Amendment	Requires that citizen-initiated ballot measures receive at least 60% voter approval to make certain tax-related changes, including imposing a new tax, expanding an existing tax to apply to additional items or transactions, increasing an existing tax rate, or adjusting a property tax rate in a way that reduces the rate less than it would decrease under current law.	Nov 3	394,122; 38.55%	628,140; 61.45%

=== Vermont ===
Origin	Status	Measure	Description (Result of a "yes" vote)	Date	Yes	No
Legislative	Approved	Vermont Proposal 3, Right to Collective Bargaining Amendment	Amend the state constitution to establish a right to organize or join a labor organization for the purpose of collective bargaining.	Nov 3	215,707; 73.94%	76,044; 26.06%
Legislative	Approved	Vermont Proposal 4, Equal Protection of Law Amendment	Amend the state constitution to prohibit the denial of rights to an individual based on their race, ethnicity, sex, religion, disability, sexual orientation, gender identity, gender expression, or national origin.	Nov 3	230,396; 78.60%	62,737; 21.40%

=== Virginia ===
Origin	Status	Measure	Description (Result of a "yes" vote)	Date	Yes	No
Legislative	Approved	Virginia Use of Legislative Congressional Redistricting Map Amendment	Amends the state constitution to allow for mid-decade redistricting of congressional districts in response to mid-decade redistricting in other states.	Apr 21	1,604,276; 51.69%	1,499,393; 48.31%
Legislative	Approved	Virginia Question 1, Right to Reproductive Freedom Amendment	Amends the state constitution to establish a right to abortion up to fetal viability.	Nov 3	2,246,164; 62.76%	1,332,778; 37.24%
Legislative	Approved	Virginia Question 2, Repeal Same-Sex Marriage Ban Amendment	Amends the state constitution to repeal the state constitutional ban on same-sex marriage and legalize marriage regardless of sex, gender or race of spouses.	Nov 3	2,087,599; 57.80%	1,524,041; 42.20%
Legislative	Approved	Virginia Question 3, Voting Rights Restoration Amendment	Amends the state constitution to automatically restore voting to felons upon release from incarceration.	Nov 3	2,048,380; 56.84%	1,555,439; 43.16%

=== Washington ===
Origin	Status	Measure	Description (Result of a "yes" vote)	Date	Yes	No
Citizens	Failed	Washington Initiative 001, Parental Right to Review Education Materials, Receive Notifications, and Opt Out of Sexual-Health Education Initiative	Re-enact Initiative 2081, known as the Washington Declaration of Parental and Legal Guardian Rights, to: Re-enact rights to receive prior notification about medical services being offered to their child, except in medical emergencies; to receive prior notification about medical services or medications provided that could affect the parent's or guardian's health insurance costs; and to receive prior notification when the school arranges medical treatment that requires follow-up care after school hours; Repeal rights added by HB 1296 to have their child receive a public education in an environment where discrimination based on a protected class is prohibited; to file a complaint on behalf of their child relating to harassment, intimidation, and bullying; and to receive annual notice of the public school's language access policies and services; Re-enact rights modified by HB 1296 to review their child's education records; review textbooks, curriculum, and supplemental material in a classroom; notify parents within 48 hours of receiving a report alleging sexual misconduct by a school employee; and not require schools to release records related to health care and social work to parents during an investigation of child abuse or neglect.	Nov 3	1,482,898; 47.57%	1,634,308; 52.43%
Citizens	Approved	Washington Initiative 638, Sex Verification Requirements for Female School Sports Initiative	Require school districts and nonprofit organizations that regulate interscholastic activities to "prohibit biologically male students from competing with and against female students" in sports with separate team or individual competitions for male and female students; and require students seeking to participate in athletic activities designated for female students to submit documentation from their healthcare provider verifying the student's biological sex based on "reproductive anatomy, genetic makeup, or normal endogenously produced testosterone levels".	Nov 3	1,780,444; 55.91%	1,403,938; 44.09%
Citizens	Failed	Washington Initiative 645, Repeal Tax on Household Income Over $1 Million and Prohibit State and Local Taxes on Income Initiative	Repeal the provision of the law that establishes a 9.9% tax on individual and household wage income above $1 million per year; prohibit future taxes on income; and define income as "any gain or benefit measured in money derived from an individual's capital, labor, property, or other source."	Nov 3	1,345,768; 41.98%	1,859,736; 58.02%

=== West Virginia ===
Origin	Status	Measure	Description (Result of a "yes" vote)	Date	Yes	No
Legislature	Approved	West Virginia Citizenship Voting Requirement Amendment	Amend the West Virginia Constitution so that only U.S. citizens may vote in elections.	Nov 3	342,331; 79.54%	88,064; 20.46%

=== Wisconsin ===
Origin	Status	Measure	Description (Result of a "yes" vote)	Date	Yes	No
Legislative	Approved	Wisconsin Question 1, Prohibit Partial Veto to Increase Tax or Fee Amendment	Amend the Wisconsin Constitution to prohibit the governor from using the partial veto to create or increase any tax or fee.	Nov 3	1,293,704; 51.44%	1,221,513; 48.56%
Legislative	Failed	Wisconsin Question 2, Prohibit Government Closure of Places of Worship During Emergencies Amendment	Prohibit the state or any political subdivision from ordering the closure of or forbidding gatherings in places of worship in response to a state of emergency, including public health emergencies.	Nov 3	1,227,836; 48.62%	1,297,289; 51.38%
Legislative	Approved	Wisconsin Question 3, Prohibit Government Discrimination or Preferential Treatment Amendment	Prohibit any governmental entity from discriminating or granting preferential treatment based on race, sex, color, ethnicity, or national origin in public employment, public education, public contracting, or public administration.	Nov 3	1,418,891; 56.49%	1,093,066; 43.51%

=== Wyoming ===
Origin	Status	Measure	Description (Result of a "yes" vote)	Date	Yes	No
Citizens	Failed	Wyoming Initiative 1, Homeowner's Primary Residence Property Tax Exemption Initiative	Allow eligible homeowners to exempt 50% of their primary residence's assessed value from property taxes.	Nov 3	80,047; 43.21%	105,209; 56.79%

== Other jurisdictions ==
=== District of Columbia ===
Origin	Status	Measure	Description (Result of a "yes" vote)	Date	Yes	No
Citizens	Approved	Washington, D.C., Initiative 86, Prohibit Force-Feeding Birds and Sale of Foie Gras and Other Fattened Bird Liver Products Initiative	Prohibit the force-feeding of birds to enlarge their livers and ban the commercial sale, distribution, and importation of foie gras and other fattened bird liver products in Washington, D.C., with exemptions for force-feeding directed by a licensed veterinarian solely for therapeutic purposes.	Nov 3	143,672; 73.15%	52,728; 26.85%

== By topic ==
=== Abortion ===
State	Origin	Status	Measure	Description (Result of a "yes" vote)	Date	Yes	No
Idaho	Citizens	Failed	Idaho Proposition 1, Idaho Reproductive Freedom and Privacy Act Initiative	Create a right to reproductive freedom and privacy, declaring that the state can regulate abortion after the point of fetal viability, except in cases of medical emergency, and stating that the government can not interfere with the following personal decisions about reproductive healthcare regarding childbirth care, contraception, fertility treatment, miscarriage care, and prenatal, pregnancy, and postpartum care.	Nov 3	320,257; 44.09%	406,136; 55.91%
Missouri	Legislature	Failed	Missouri Amendment 3, Prohibit Abortion and Gender Transition Procedures for Minors Amendment	Repeal Amendment 3, which enshrined abortion as a constitutional right up to fetal viability, and prohibit abortion, except in cases of medical emergency, fetal anomaly, rape, or incest, with cases of rape and incest only able to have an abortion performed before 12 weeks; Require parental consent for a minor seeking an abortion, except in cases of medical emergency where consent cannot be obtained; Prohibit fetal organ harvesting after an abortion - defined as the collection of fetal tissue, organs, or fluids for the purpose of selling or collecting for scientific purposes - except for paternity testing, determination of anomaly or condition of the unborn child, or for law enforcement purposes; Provide that women can access healthcare in cases of miscarriages and ectopic pregnancies; Provide for the general assembly to enact laws and regulations regarding the provision of abortions, abortion facilities, and abortion providers; and prohibit gender transition surgeries for minors under eighteen, and prohibit the prescribing of cross-sex hormones or puberty blocking drugs to minors under eighteen for the purposes of gender transition.	Nov 3	964,923; 45.07%	1,175,873; 54.93%
Nevada	Citizens	Approved	Nevada Question 6, Right to Abortion Initiative	Reaffirm Question 6, which would amend the state constitution to provide for a state constitutional right to an abortion, and for the state to regulate abortion after fetal viability, except where medically indicated to "protect the life or health of the pregnant patient".	Nov 3	672,972; 63.51%	386,709; 36.49%
Virginia	Legislative	Approved	2026 Virginia Right to Reproductive Freedom Amendment	Amends the state constitution to establish a right to abortion up to fetal viability.	Nov 3	2,246,164; 62.76%	1,332,778; 37.24%

=== Elections ===
State	Origin	Status	Measure	Description (Result of a "yes" vote)	Date	Yes	No
Alaska	Citizens	Approved	Alaska Establish Campaign Contribution Limits for State and Local Elections Initiative	Establish new campaign contribution limits for campaigns for state and local office, limiting an individuals max contributable in an election cycle to $2,000 to candidates, $4,000 for a joint-lieutenant governor ticket, or $5,000 for a political party, with Political parties allowed to contribute up to $4,000 for candidates and $5,000 to other parties or political groups.	Aug 18	117,962; 72.20%	45,418; 27.80%
Alaska	Citizens	Failed	Repeal Alaska's electoral system of ranked-choice voting, nonpartisan blanket primaries, and campaign disclosure rules	Repeal Alaska Measure 2, eliminating the top-four primaries and ranked-choice voting general elections in Alaska, alongside the established campaign finance provisions requiring persons and entities contributing more than $2,000 derived from donations, contributions, dues, or gifts to disclose the true sources (as defined in law) of their political contributions.	Nov 3	124,631; 46.38%	144,102; 53.62%
Arkansas	Legislature	Approved	Arkansas Citizenship Requirement for Voting Amendment	Amend the state constitution to mandate that only U.S. citizens may vote in state or local elections.	Nov 3	597,481; 69.09%	267,343; 30.91%
California	Legislature	Approved	Proposition 5: California Eliminate State Officer Recall Successor Elections Amendment	Amend the state constitution to eliminate the election of a successor when a state officer is recalled, thereby leaving the office vacant until it is filled according to state law; allowing for the recalled officer to run again for the same office at the special election, if one is held; and authorize the lieutenant governor to fill the gubernatorial vacancy until the expired term, unless the vacancy occurred before the close of the nomination period for the next statewide election during the first two years of the governor's term, in which a special election would be called and which the winner would serve the remainder of the term.	Nov 3	6,374,495; 51.88%	5,913,266; 48.12%
Idaho	Legislature	Failed	Idaho HJR 4, Grant Legislature Exclusive Authority and Prohibit Citizen-Initiated Measures on Marijuana, Narcotics, and Psychoactive Substances Amendment	Amend the state constitution to hold that only the Idaho State Legislature shall have the authority to legalize marijuana, narcotics, or other psychoactive substances and remove the ability for citizens to initiate state statutes that would legalize these substances.	Nov 3	240,865; 33.74%	473,007; 66.26%
Indiana	Legislature	Approved	Indiana Public Question 2, Indiana Residency Requirements for City and Town Court Judges Amendment	Requires city and town court judges to reside in either the county where the court is located or the bordering county closest to the court.	Nov 3	1,132,631; 62.44%	681,263; 37.56%
Kansas	Legislature	Failed	Kansas Elections for Supreme Court Justices Amendment	Amend the state constitution to authorize the election of state Supreme Court justices, make justices' terms six years, and abolish the existing state Supreme Court nominating commission.	Aug 4	236,764; 38.68%	375,347; 61.32%
Kansas	Legislature	Approved	Kansas Citizenship Voting Requirement Amendment	Amend the state constitution to state so that only a citizen of the United States is eligible to vote in state and local elections.	Nov 3	673,587; 63.60%	385,476; 36.40%
Maryland	Legislature	Approved	Maryland Question 3, Maryland Provide That Nothing in State Constitution Establishes Criteria for Congressional Redistricting Amendment	Amend the Maryland Constitution concerning congressional redistricting to provide that constitutional requirements for contiguity, compactness, substantially equal population, and consideration of natural and political subdivision boundaries apply only to state legislative districts, not congressional districts; to allow the General Assembly to grant the Supreme Court of Maryland original jurisdiction over challenges to congressional redistricting plans; and provide that the Maryland Constitution establishes no criteria for congressional district boundaries.	Nov 3	1,318,162; 61.78%	815,525; 38.22%
Massachusetts	Citizens	Failed	Massachusetts Question 3, Top-Two Primary Elections Initiative	Create a single primary election in which all candidates would be listed on the same ballot for state elections, regardless of their political affiliation, with the two candidates that receive the most votes would advance to the general election.	Nov 3	1,001,405; 38.96%	1,568,783; 61.04%
Missouri	Legislature	Failed	Missouri Amendment 4, Require Congressional District Approval for Initiated Constitutional Amendments, Prohibit Foreign Contributions, and Penalize Petition Fraud Amendment	Require the majority of voters from each congressional district to approve initiative petitions to amend the constitution, prohibit foreign nationals from contributing to ballot measure campaigns, among other provisions.	Aug 4	275,040; 19.68%	1,122,748; 80.32%
Missouri	Veto Referendum	Failed	Missouri Proposition A, Missouri Congressional Map Referendum	Uphold House Bill 1, which provided for new congressional districts.	Nov 3	788,483; 38.17%	1,277,362; 61.83%
Nebraska	Legislature	Failed	Nebraska Change State Legislative Term Limits from Two to Three Consecutive Terms Amendment	Amend the state constitution to change the term limit for state legislators from two consecutive terms (eight years) to three consecutive terms (12 years).	Nov 3	136,438; 18.63%	595,827; 81.37%
North Dakota	Legislature	Approved	North Dakota Single-Subject Requirement for Constitutional Amendments Measure	Creates a single-subject requirement for citizen initiated and legislatively referred constitutional amendments and prohibits the secretary of state from approving an initiative for circulation if the initiative is determined to include more than one subject.	Jun 9	77,072; 66.43%	38,955; 33.57%
North Dakota	Legislature	Failed	North Dakota Constitutional Measure 1, North Dakota 60% Vote Requirement for Constitutional Amendments Measure	Requires citizen initiated or legislatively referred constitutional amendments to receive a 60% vote to be adopted.	Nov 3	101,659; 43.52%	131,947; 56.48%
South Dakota	Legislative	Approved	South Dakota Constitutional Amendment J, Citizenship Voting Requirement Amendment	Amend the state constitution to mandate that only U.S. citizens are eligible to vote in state and local elections.	Nov 3	183,763; 61.52%	114,927; 38.48%
South Dakota	Legislative	Failed	South Dakota Constitutional Amendment L, South Dakota Constitutional Amendment L, 60% Vote Requirement for Constitutional Amendments Measure	Require constitutional amendments to be approved by 60% of voters.	Nov 3	126,174; 42.41%	171,359; 57.59%
Utah	Legislative	Failed	Utah 60% Vote Requirement for Ballot Initiatives to Increase or Expand Taxes Amendment	Requires that citizen-initiated ballot measures receive at least 60% voter approval to make certain tax-related changes, including imposing a new tax, expanding an existing tax to apply to additional items or transactions, increasing an existing tax rate, or adjusting a property tax rate in a way that reduces the rate less than it would decrease under current law.	Nov 3	389,583; 38.67%	617,781; 61.33%
Utah	Legislative	Approved	Utah Publication Requirements for Constitutional Amendments Measure	Amend the state constitution to require that constitutional amendments be published, in a manner provided by the legislature, for 60 days immediately before the next general election.	Nov 3	610,158; 61.12%	388,109; 38.88%

=== Law and crime ===
State	Origin	Status	Measure	Description (Result of a "yes" vote)	Date	Yes	No
Alabama	Legislature	Approved	Alabama Allow Judges to Deny Bail for Certain Weapon Discharges and Solicitation, Attempt, or Conspiracy to Commit Murder Amendment	Remove the right of bail for the crimes of shooting or discharging a firearm, explosive, or other weapon into an occupied dwelling, building, railroad locomotive, railroad car, aircraft, automobile, truck, or watercraft, and for the solicitation, attempt, or conspiracy to commit murder.	May 19	689,987; 81.59%	155,652; 18.41%
Alabama	Legislature	Approved	Alabama Prohibit Diminishing District Attorney Compensation During Term of Office Amendment	Prohibit the reduction of a district attorney's compensation during their term in office.	May 19	474,083; 57.75%	346,823; 42.25%
Arizona	Legislature	Approved	Arizona Proposition 317, Arizona Designate Drug Cartels as Terrorist Organizations and Require State DHS to Address Threats Measure	Declares drug cartels to be terrorist organizations and requires the Arizona Department of Homeland Security do "everything within its authority to address the threat posed by drug cartels".	Nov 3	1,404,174; 56.15%	1,096,390; 43.85%
Arkansas	Legislature	Approved	Arkansas Right to Keep and Bear Arms Amendment	Expand the constitutional right to keep and bear arms to include for lawful hunting and recreational use or other lawful purposes, without limitation on the possession and use of ammunition, firearm accessories, or firearm components stating that the right to keep and bear arms is "a natural, fundamental, and individual right that shall not be infringed".	Nov 3	614,054; 70.80%	253,197; 29.20%
Colorado	Citizens	Failed	Amendment 81, Colorado Notification of U.S. Department of Homeland Security for Certain Criminal Charges and Immigration Status Initiative	Amend the Colorado Constitution to require state and local law enforcement to notify the U.S. Department of Homeland Security after charging an individual when the individual is not lawfully present in the United States, or if their immigration status cannot be determined after a reasonable effort by law enforcement; and either the individual is charged with a crime of violence, as defined by law, or the individual has been convicted of a prior felony.	Nov 3	1,189,572; 44.67%	1,473,718; 55.33%
Colorado	Citizens	Approved	Proposition 132: Colorado Penalties for Fentanyl Sale and Possession Initiative	Establish higher felony classifications and mandatory penalties for the manufacturing, dispensing, sale, and possession of fentanyl and certain synthetic opioids;require court-ordered treatment for certain low-level fentanyl possession felony offenses; and revise sentencing provisions to limit exceptions for fentanyl-related distribution offenses that result in death.	Nov 3	1,391,309; 52.64%	1,251,812; 47.36%
Colorado	Citizens	Approved	Proposition 133: Colorado Require Life in Prison for Human Trafficking of Minors Measure	Require life in prison without parole or release for persons convicted of human trafficking a child for sexual servitude.	Nov 3	1,641,770; 62.13%	1,000,693; 37.87%
Idaho	Legislature	Failed	Idaho HJR 4, Grant Legislature Exclusive Authority and Prohibit Citizen-Initiated Measures on Marijuana, Narcotics, and Psychoactive Substances Amendment	Amend the state constitution to hold that only the Idaho State Legislature shall have the authority to legalize marijuana, narcotics, or other psychoactive substances and remove the ability for citizens to initiate state statutes that would legalize these substances.	Nov 3	240,865; 33.74%	473,007; 66.26%
Indiana	Legislature	Approved	Indiana Public Question 1, Bailable Offenses and Substantial Risk Standard Amendment	Amend the Indiana Constitution to provide that offenses, other than murder or treason, are bailable "unless the accused poses a substantial risk to any other person or the community" if the presumption is strong and the state proves that no condition of release will protect the community.	Nov 3	1,053,551; 58.33%	752,672; 41.67%
Louisiana	Legislature	Approved	Louisiana Amendment 3, Louisiana Prohibit Post-Conviction Bail for Individuals Convicted of Assault Against Minors Amendment	Prohibit post-conviction bail for a defendant who is convicted of an aggravated offense, as defined by law, against a victim who is a minor.	Nov 3	972,736; 67.80%	461,892; 32.20%
Massachusetts	Veto Referendum	Approved	Massachusetts Question 9, Massachusetts Firearm Regulations Referendum	Uphold House Bill 4885, which enacted several changes to the state's firearm regulations including: developing an electronic tracking system; prohibiting assault-style firearms (as defined in law); requiring safety certificates to obtain firearm permits; mandating serial numbers for firearms; allowing school administrators and licensed healthcare providers to request that a court issue an Extreme Risk Protection Order; and permitting courts to order firearm surrender when issuing Harassment Prevention Orders.	Nov 3	1,758,691; 67.34%	852,895; 32.66%
Tennessee	Legislative	Approved	Tennessee Amendment 1, Tennessee Remove Right to Bail for Certain Criminal Offenses Amendment	Amend the state constitution to remove the right to bail in cases where the presumption of guilt is great and the defendant is accused of acts of terrorism, second-degree murder, aggravated rape of a child, grave torture, or any other offense for which a convicted individual could not be released prior to the expiration of at least 85% of their sentence.	Nov 3	1,337,370; 67.18%	653,480; 32.82%
Tennessee	Legislative	Approved	Tennessee Amendment 3, Tennessee Marsy's Law Crime Victims Rights Amendment	Replaces the existing list of rights for victims of crimes in the state constitution with a new list, including the rights to be present at all criminal proceedings, to be free from harassment, intimidation, and abuse throughout the criminal justice system, to be provided reasonable notice of all public criminal proceedings, to have the safety of the victim, the victim's family, and the general public considered before any parole decision is made, and to be treated with fairness to be heard in any proceeding involving release, plea, sentencing, disposition, and parole among other rights.	Nov 3	1,533,214; 76.08%	482,034; 23.92%

=== LGBTQ issues ===
State	Origin	Status	Measure	Description (Result of a "yes" vote)	Date	Yes	No
Colorado	Citizens	Approved	Proposition 134: Sex Requirement for School and College Sports Initiative	Require student athletes to participate on men's or women's school and collegiate athletic teams that match their sex, defined as biological reproductive systems.	Nov 3	1,379,283; 52.16%	1,265,157; 47.84%
Colorado	Citizens	Approved	Proposition 135: Colorado Prohibit Surgeries for Treatment in Response to Minors' Perception of Sex or Gender Measure	Prohibit healthcare professionals from performing or providing surgeries to persons under age 18 for the purpose of “treatment in response to a minor's perception of sex or gender” and prohibit the use of state or federal funds, Medicaid reimbursements, or insurance coverage to pay for such procedures.	Nov 3	1,373,942; 51.90%	1,273,598; 48.10%
Missouri	Legislature	Failed	Missouri Amendment 3, Prohibit Abortion and Gender Transition Procedures for Minors Amendment	Repeal Amendment 3, which enshrined abortion as a constitutional right up to fetal viability, and prohibit abortion, except in cases of medical emergency, fetal anomaly, rape, or incest, with cases of rape and incest only able to have an abortion performed before 12 weeks; Require parental consent for a minor seeking an abortion, except in cases of medical emergency where consent cannot be obtained; Prohibit fetal organ harvesting after an abortion - defined as the collection of fetal tissue, organs, or fluids for the purpose of selling or collecting for scientific purposes - except for paternity testing, determination of anomaly or condition of the unborn child, or for law enforcement purposes; Provide that women can access healthcare in cases of miscarriages and ectopic pregnancies; Provide for the general assembly to enact laws and regulations regarding the provision of abortions, abortion facilities, and abortion providers; and prohibit gender transition surgeries for minors under eighteen, and prohibit the prescribing of cross-sex hormones or puberty blocking drugs to minors under eighteen for the purposes of gender transition.	Nov 3	964,923; 45.07%	1,175,873; 54.93%
Vermont	Legislative	Approved	Vermont Proposal 4, Equal Protection of Law Amendment	Amend the state constitution to prohibit the denial of rights to an individual based on their race, ethnicity, sex, religion, disability, sexual orientation, gender identity, gender expression, or national origin.	Nov 3	230,396; 78.60%	62,737; 21.40%
Virginia	Legislative	Approved	2026 Virginia Repeal Same-Sex Marriage Ban Amendment	Amends the state constitution to repeal the state constitutional ban on same-sex marriage and legalize marriage regardless of sex, gender or race of spouses.	Nov 3	2,087,599; 57.80%	1,524,041; 42.20%
Washington	Citizens	Approved	Washington Sex Verification Requirements for Female School Sports Initiative	Require school districts and nonprofit organizations that regulate interscholastic activities to "prohibit biologically male students from competing with and against female students" in sports with separate team or individual competitions for male and female students; and require students seeking to participate in athletic activities designated for female students to submit documentation from their healthcare provider verifying the student's biological sex based on "reproductive anatomy, genetic makeup, or normal endogenously produced testosterone levels".	Nov 3	1,765,555; 55.99%	1,387,797; 44.01%

=== Voter identification ===
State	Origin	Status	Measure	Description (Result of a "yes" vote)	Date	Yes	No
Arizona	Legislature	Failed	Arizona Proposition 144, Arizona Voter Identification and Citizenship Voting Requirements Amendment	Specify that only citizens may vote in any election in Arizona, prohibit a foreign national from making contributions in an effort to influence an Arizona election, and prohibit others from knowingly accepting such contributions, require voters to provide government-issued identification to cast a ballot, and grant voters the right to have their vote tabulated at their voting location.	Nov 3	1,162,297; 46.69%	1,327,018; 53.31%
California	Citizens	Failed	Proposition 39: California Voter Identification and Voter List Maintenance Requirements Initiative	Require voters to designate a government-issued ID when registering to vote, and to present that ID for in-person voting or provide the last four digits for mail-in ballots; require election officials to "maintain accurate voter registration lists [and]... use best efforts to verify citizenship attestations using government data” and to report each year the percentage of each county's voter rolls that have been citizenship-verified; require the State Auditor to audit government compliance with these requirements during odd-numbered years and report “findings and recommendations for improving the integrity of elections to the public.”	Nov 3	5,075,438; 39.49%	7,777,263; 60.51%
Nevada	Citizens	Approved	Nevada Question 7, Require Voter Identification Initiative	Amend the state constitution to require that Nevada residents present a form of photo identification to verify their identity while voting in person, or to verify their identity using the last four digits of their driver's license or Social Security number when voting by mail.	Nov 3	663,411; 62.17%	403,686; 37.83%
North Carolina	Legislature	Approved	North Carolina Require Voter Identification Amendment	Amend the state constitution to require photo identification to vote for all voters, not just those voting in person.	Nov 3	2,474,609; 59.61%	1,676,587; 40.39%
Ohio	Legislature	Approved	Ohio Issue 3, Require Voter Identification Amendment	Amend the Ohio constitution to require a photo ID to vote.	Nov 3	2,934,333; 65.34%	1,556,877; 34.66%
Oklahoma	Legislature	Approved	Oklahoma State Question 846, Voter Identification Requirement Amendment	Create a constitutional requirement for voters to provide proof of identity when voting in any election in the state, and allowing the state legislature to define proof of identity.	Aug 25	292,599; 54.61%	243,159; 45.39%
