= 2026 Alaska elections =

Elections in the U.S. state of Alaska in 2026

Ranked-choice general elections were held in the U.S. state of Alaska on November 3, 2026. Nonpartisan top-four primary elections had been held on August 18, 2026.

== Federal offices ==
=== United States Senate ===
Two-term incumbent Dan Sullivan ran for re-election. He faced former Democratic congresswoman Mary Peltola, along with two minor candidates. Peltola won an outright majority in the first-choice vote.

=== United States House of Representatives ===
One-term incumbent Nick Begich III is running for re-election. He had won his seat in a highly competitive election in 2024 against then-incumbent congresswoman Mary Peltola.

== State offices ==
=== Governor ===
Two-term incumbent Republican Governor Mike Dunleavy is term-limited and cannot seek re-election. Alaskans elect their governor and lieutenant governor on one ticket. Seventeen candidates are running for governor in 2026: eleven Republican candidates, three Democratic, and three independents, including former governor Bill Walker. In the general election, Democratic former state representative Jonathan Kreiss-Tomkins won the election with an outright majority in the first-choice vote, beating three Republican challengers, and became the first Democrat to be elected governor of Alaska since Tony Knowles in 1998.

=== State legislative ===
==== House of Representatives ====
The Alaskan House of Representatives is governed by a Coalition Government with all Democrats and Independents and some Republicans in control of the government.

==== Senate ====
Like the Alaskan House of Representatives, the Alaskan Senate is governed by a coalition government with all Democrats and some Republicans in control of the government.

=== Judicial ===
==== Supreme Court ====
Alaskan State Supreme Court Justice Jude Pate is up for re-election. These are non-partisan elections.

== Ballot measures ==
Referendums on three ballot measures are held in 2026 in Alaska.

- The "Establish Campaign Contribution Limits for State and Local Elections Initiative" set to establish campaign contribution limits for state and local campaigns. It was approved by voters on August 18, 2026.
- "An Act Restoring Political Party Primaries, Ending Ranked-Choice General Elections, and Repealing Recent Campaign Finance Laws" would get rid of open primary elections, where all candidates appear on one ballot. It would also get rid of ranked-choice general elections. It would bring back political party primaries and single-choice general elections. It would also repeal certain campaign finance rules that were added by a 2020 ballot measure. This was the second initiative attempting to repeal ranked-choice voting, following the failed 2024 Ballot Measure 2. A majority of voters rejected the measure.
- 2026 Alaska Measure 3, the "United States Citizens Voter Act," was approved by voters. It specified that only United States citizens can vote in Alaska. This did not change the legal requirements to vote in the state.
