= Alabama Amendment 2 =

Alabama Amendment 2 can refer to several amendments:

- 2000 Alabama Amendment 2
- 2004 Alabama Amendment 2
- 2018 Alabama Amendment 2
- May 2026 Alabama Amendment 2
- November 2026 Alabama Amendment 2
