= 2026 North Dakota Constitutional Measure 1 =

- November 3, 2026
- 60% Vote Requirement for Constitutional Amendments Measure

Results
Choice	Votes	%
Yes	101,659	43.52%
No	131,947	56.48%
Total votes	233,606	100.00%

Constitutional Measure 1, formerly known as Measure 2, was a legislatively referred constitutional amendment that appeared on the November 3, 2026, ballot in the US state of North Dakota. Had voters approved the measure, constitutional amendments that are initiated by citizens or referred by the state legislature would have needed a 60% "Yes" vote to be adopted, rather than a simple majority.

== Background ==
The North Dakota Constitution currently stipulates that constitutional amendments need to receive a simple majority vote (over 50%) to be adopted.

11 other U.S. states currently have special vote thresholds, including supermajority requirements. Four similar ballot measures were voted on in the same election cycle. (Note: California Vote Requirements for Initiatives Requiring Supermajority Votes Amendment, Missouri Amendment 4, South Dakota Constitutional Amendment L and Utah 60% Vote Requirement for Ballot Initiatives to Increase or Expand Taxes Amendment.)

== Endorsements ==
Yes

State legislators

- Kathy Hogan, minority leader of the North Dakota Senate (2022–present) from the 21st district (2018–present) (Democratic)
- David Hogue, majority leader of the North Dakota Senate (2023–present) from the 38th district (2008–present) (Republican)
- Janne Myrdal, state senator from the 19th district (2022–present) and 10th district (2016–2022) (Republican)
- Jeff Barta, state senator from the 43rd district (2022–present) (Republican)
- Steve Vetter, state senator from the 18th district (2016–present) (Republican)
- Glenn Bosch, state representative from the 30th district (2016–present) (Republican)
- Lawrence Klemin, former speaker of the North Dakota House of Representatives (2018–2020) from the 47th district (1998–present) (Republican)
- Mike Lefor, majority leader of the North Dakota House of Representatives (2022–present) from the 37th district (2014–present) (Republican)
- Robin Weisz, speaker of the North Dakota House of Representatives (2025–present) from the 14th district (1996–present) (Republican)
No

State legislators

- Sean Cleary, state senator from the 35th district (2023–present) (Republican)

Organizations

- League of Women Voters of North Dakota
- Red River Valley Democratic Socialists of America

== Results ==
2026 North Dakota Constutitional Measure 1
Choice	Votes	%
For	101,659	43.52
Against	131,947	56.48
Total	233,606	100.00

== See also ==
- 2026 United States ballot measures
- 2026 California Vote Requirements for Initiatives Requiring Supermajority Votes Amendment
- 2026 Missouri Amendment 4
