= 2026 Colorado Amendment 84 =

Amendment 84
- November 3, 2026
- Require Voter Identification Number for Mail-In Ballots Initiative
- Outcome: TBD
- Website: https://results.enr.clarityelections.com/CO/127407/web.345435/#/detail/6030

Results
| Choice | Votes | % |
|---|---|---|
| Yes | 873,223 | 36.99% |
| No | 1,487,385 | 63.01% |
- Post-Election Reporting In Progress (unofficial reslts)

2026 Colorado Amendment 84 is a proposed ballot measure that appears before Colorado voters in the 2026 general election. This is a citizen-initiated amendment to the Colorado constitution and would require voters to sign their ballot and add a portion of an identification number (social security number, Colorado driver's license, or ID card) on the outside of the envelope in order for it to be counted.

== Background ==
Current Colorado law requires a valid signature on the exterior of your mail ballot in order for it to be counted. For in-person voting in Colorado, an ID must be presented before voting and this requirement is not impacted by proposed Amendment 84. In 2024, 92% of Colorado voters used a mail-in ballot (2,988,864 mail-in voters, 251,685 in-person voters). If the signature on the exterior of the ballot is not verifiable with the signature that officials have on record, the ballot is not opened and the vote is not counted. Voters with ballots that are unverified are contacted by officials and have eight days to respond with an ID to have their ballot counted.

Colorado Amendment 84 was funded by the Coalition for American Prosperity and Growth, which is a conservative group from Ohio. This group does not disclose the identity of their donors. Other financial contributors include the organization A Public Voice, from Virginia, and American Jobs and Growth Fund, also out of Virginia.

Opponents says that ballots that are valid will not be counted. There is concern about a rejection rate increasing to 50%. Opponents also believe that some voters will not participate in elections because of concerns about privacy. A nonpartisan legislative analysis found there would need to be increased state spending of $2.5 million in the first year of this proposed amendment's implementation and $1.2 million in future years. Proponents of this measure say the estimate of 50% rejection rates is not accurate and this amendment would make elections more secure.

Similar measures have passed recently in Texas, Georgia, and Virginia. According to data from the Voting Rights Lab, each of those states saw an increase in mail ballots that were rejected. The state with the most similar identification measures to proposed Amendment 84 is Texas which implemented their law in 2022. In Texas, after the implementation of the ID number requirement in addition to signatures on mail in ballots, the rejection rate increased to 11.6%. The 2024 Texas mail ballot rejection rate was 3.5% while in 2024 Colorado's mail ballot rejection rate was 1.4%.

Similar measures are on 2026 ballots in Arizona, California, Nevada, North Carolina, and Ohio.

== Contents ==
This proposition appears on the ballot as follows:

Shall there be an amendment to the Colorado Constitution requiring a voter to sign and include the last four digits of their social security number or their Colorado driver's license or identification card number on the outside of their mail ballot for any federal or state election, and, in connection therewith, allowing the voter to correct missing or incorrect information, including with alternative forms of identification; and prohibiting a county clerk and recorder from counting the mail ballot unless the problem is fixed?

Yes means: Voters will be required to provide identification number information on the exterior of their mail ballot, in addition to their signature.

No means: Voters will continued to be required to sign their mail ballots for verification.

== Campaigns ==
'Yes'

Elected Officials

- Chuck Broerman
- Suzanne Taheri
- Matt Crane

Newspapers

- The Denver Gazette

Organizations

- West Group
- Colorado Voter Trust Initiative
- Coalition for American Prosperity and Growth
- Independence Institute
'No'

Elected Officials

- Jared Polis
- Scott Martinez
- Paul Lopez

Newspapers

- The Durango Herald
- The Daily Camera
- The Denver Post

Organizations

- Defend Our Ballots
- Vote Common Sense
- People for a Fair Colorado
- Make Good Change
- Colorado Democratic Party
- Boulder Progressives
- League of Women Voters
- ACLU of Colorado
- Boulder County Board of Commissioners
- Colorado AFL-CIO
- Colorado Education Association
- Common Cause Colorado
- Health Care for All Colorado
- Indivisible Colorado
- New Era Colorado
- The Bell Policy Center
- Voces Unidas Action Fund
- Arapahoe County Democratic Party

== Results ==
Results will begin to be published after the polls close on November 3, 2026 at 7:00 pm. Amendment 84 requires a 55% majority to pass. Results posted are unofficial from the Secretary of State of Colorado.

| Choice | Votes | % |
|---|---|---|
| For | 872,821 | 36.98 |
| Against | 1,487,117 | 63.02 |
| Required majority | | 55% |
| Total | 2,359,938 | 100.00 |

== See also ==
- 2026 United States ballot measures
- List of Colorado ballot measures
