= 1974 Virginia ballot measures =

The 1974 Virginia State Elections took place on Election Day, November 2, 1974, the same day as the U.S. House elections in the state. The only statewide elections on the ballot were one constitutional referendum to amend the Virginia State Constitution. Because Virginia state elections are held on off-years, no statewide officers or state legislative elections were held. All referendums were referred to the voters by the Virginia General Assembly.

== Question 1 ==
This amendment asked voters to allow grants to or on behalf of students attending non-profit institutions of higher education and to empower the Virginia General Assembly to permit the state or any political subdivision thereof to contract with non-profit institutions of higher education for the provision of educational or other related services.

Question 1
Choice	Votes	%
For	452,664	57.06
Against	340,625	42.94
Total	793,289	100.00
Source: - Official Results
