= 2026 Indiana Public Question 1 =

- November 3, 2026
- Bailable Offenses and Substantial Risk Standard Amendment
- Reporting: 99.9% as of 11/18/2026 at 11:23 a.m. EST
- Outcome: Passed

Results
Choice	Votes	%
Yes	1,063,872	58.36%
No	759,197	41.64%

Indiana Public Question 1, also known as the Bailable Offenses and Substantial Risk Standard Amendment, is a legislatively referred constitutional amendment to the Indiana Constitution. It appeared on the ballot in the U.S. state of Indiana on November 3, 2026.

== Background ==
An amendment needs to be passed by the General Assembly twice before it can be put on a general election ballot. This amendment first passed in 2023 and was written by Senator Eric Koch, a Republican, of Bedford, Indiana.

Early in 2026, the Indiana State Senate passed the amendment 43–2. Two members did not attend and one member did not vote. The Indiana House of Representatives voted the next month in approval 75–11, with fourteen members not voting. In both chambers, the Democrats were divided in their votes, while the Republicans were unanimous in support.

Similar debates over bail policy have recently appeared in the states of Texas (2025), Colorado (2024), and Wisconsin (2023).

== Impact ==
The amendment would allow bail to be denied in the following cases:

- When the proof of the charge is evident, or the presumption is strong
- When the accused individual poses a substantial risk to any other person or the community

The change would come to Article 1, Section 17 of the Indiana Constitution. It currently states "Offenses, other than murder or treason, shall be bailable by sufficient sureties. Murder or treason shall not be bailable, when the proof is evident, or the presumption strong."

== Support ==
Yes

Statewide officials

- Aaron Freeman, state senator
- Eric Koch, state senator
- Chris Jeter, state senator

Local officials

- Sue Finkam, Carmel mayor

Organizations

- Indianapolis Fraternal Order of Police

Supporters of the amendment argue that it would allow judges more options when dealing with potentially dangerous defendants.

== Opposition ==
No

Statewide officials

- Greg Taylor, state senator

Unions

- Indiana AFL-CIO

Organizations

- ACLU of Indiana

Opponents of the amendment argue that it could mean more people held in jail before conviction. There is also concern that the proposed amendment is too broad because it doesn't provide examples of specific offences that could cause someone to be held without bail. According to Danielle Drake, advocacy manager of the ACLU of Indiana, "The extremely broad language of Public Question 1 leaves the door wide open for people accused of even minor offenses to be held in jail without bail."

== Results ==
Ballot measure results will begin to be available after polls close at 6:00 p.m. on November 3, 2026.

Choice
For
Against
Total

== See also ==
- 2026 United States ballot measures
- Bail in the United States
