= 2026 Colorado Amendment 85 =

Amendment 85
- November 3, 2026
- Plain Language Ballot Titles
County results
Yes
80–90%
70–80%
60–70%
50–60%
No
60–70%
50–60%

2026 Colorado Amendment 85 is a proposed ballot measure that appears before Colorado voters during the 2026 general election. This citizen-initiated ballot measure would require that the language used on Colorado ballots be at or below an 8th grade reading level. This measure would also prohibit state statutes that conflict with this amendment.

== Background ==
The current Colorado law requires that ballot questions be written in plain English but does not have any requirements of reading level. An analysis by Ballotpedia found that Colorado's ballots are higher than a 20th-grade reading level. This amendment would apply to both citizen-initiated measures and legislative ballot measures. Other states in the United States have laws similar to this amendment including New York and Rhode Island. In 2026, Colorado passed HB26-1320 that requires that ballot language must be accessible without specifications about reading level in the bill's language.

This measure was initiated by Advance Colorado, which is a conservative political non-profit. The support for this measure is bi-partisan, but not unanimous. Groups in favor of this amendment are looking for a specific benchmark for readability of ballot language. Opponents of this amendment support HB26-1320, they are against the addition to the Colorado Constitution and also argue leaving the issue of readability in the hands of Colorado lawmakers.

== Contents ==
The proposition appears on the ballot as follows:

Shall there be an amendment to the Colorado Constitution concerning ballot question language, and, in connection therewith, requiring all state and local ballot questions to be written in plain language and at no more than an 8th grade reading level and prohibiting a state statute from requiring language that conflicts with these requirements in ballot questions for citizen-initiated measures?

Yes means: Requiring all ballot language to be at or below an 8th grade level and prohibits any law from interfering with that.

No means: Maintaining current laws for ballots to be written in plain, accessible language without any reading level requirement.

== Campaigns ==
'Yes'

Newspapers

- The Denver Post

Elected Officials

- Amber McReynolds

Organizations

- Advance Colorado
- Courageous Colorado
- The African Leadership Group
- Brighter Colorado
- Common Sense America
'No'

Organizations

- League of Woman Voters Colorado
- Vote Common Sense
- People for a Fair Colorado
- Boulder Progressives
- The Bell Policy Center
- The Colorado Democratic Party
- Make Good Change

== Results ==
Results will begin to be published after the polls close on November 3rd, 2026 at 7:00 pm. Amendment 85 requires a 55% majority to pass. Results listed are unofficial from the Secretary of State of Colorado.

Choice	Votes	%
For	1,197,558	51.14
Against	1,144,237	48.86
Required majority		55%
Total	2,341,795	100.00

== See also ==
- 2026 United States ballot measures
- List of Colorado ballot measures
