= 2018 Alabama Amendment 2 =

Referendum to remove abortion protections

Alabama Amendment 2
- November 6, 2018
- (a) This state acknowledges, declares, and affirms that it is the public policy of this state to recognize and support the sanctity of unborn life and the rights of unborn children, including the right to life. (b) This state further acknowledges, declares, and affirms that it is the public policy of this state to ensure the protection of the rights of the unborn child in all manners and measures lawful and appropriate. (c) Nothing in this Constitution secures or protects a right to abortion or requires the funding of an abortion.

Results
Choice	Votes	%
Yes	916,061	59.01%
No	636,438	40.99%
Valid votes	1,552,499	100.00%
Invalid or blank votes	0	0.00%
Total votes	1,552,499	100.00%
- Yes: 50–60% 60–70% 70–80% 80–90% No: 50–60% 60–70% 70–80%

The State Abortion Policy Amendment, also known as Amendment 2, was a legislatively referred constitutional amendment that appeared on the ballot in the U.S. state of Alabama on November 6, 2018. The measure amended the Constitution of Alabama to remove any and all protections for both abortion access and funding and codified protections for unborn children. It was approved by 59% of voters.

The amendment itself did not prohibit abortion in Alabama due to federal protections via Roe v. Wade. Following the passage of Amendment 2, in May 2019, a near-total abortion ban was signed into law by Governor Kay Ivey. The abortion ban was blocked by a federal judge in October 2019, though it would go into effect again on June 24, 2022, following the Dobbs decision by the United States Supreme Court.

== Endorsements ==
Yes

Statewide officials

- Twinkle Andress Cavanaugh, President of the Alabama Public Service Commission (2012–present) and candidate for lieutenant governor in 2018 (Republican)
- Kay Ivey, Governor of Alabama (2017–present), former Lieutenant Governor of Alabama (2011–2017), and former Alabama State Treasurer (2003–2011) (Republican)
- Steve Marshall, Attorney General of Alabama (2017–present) and former district attorney of Marshall County (2001–2017) (Republican)

State senators

- Steve Livingston, state senator from the 8th district (2014–present) (Republican)
- Phil Williams, state senator from the 10th district (2010–2018) (Republican)

State representatives

- Will Ainsworth, state representative from the 27th district (2014–present) and nominee for lieutenant governor in 2018 (Republican)
- Matt Fridy, state representative from the 73rd district (2014–present) (Republican)
- Mac McCutcheon, Speaker of the Alabama House of Representatives (2016–present) and state representative from the 25th district (2006–present) (Republican)

Individuals

- Terry Lathan, chairwoman of the Alabama Republican Party (2015–present)

Organizations

- Alabama Policy Institute
- Alabama Republican Party
- Choose Life Inc.
- Eagle Forum
No

State senators

- Linda Coleman-Madison, state senator from the 20th district (2006–present) and state representative from the 60th district (2002-2006) (Democratic)
- Vivian Davis Figures, state senator from the 33rd district (1997–present) (Democratic)

State representatives

- Juandalynn Givan, state representative from the 60th district (2010–present) (Democratic)
- Mary Moore, state representative from the 56th district (2002–present) (Democratic)

Local officials

- Walt Maddox, Mayor of Tuscaloosa (2005–present) and nominee for governor in 2018 (Democratic)

Newspapers and other media

- The Anniston Star

Organizations

- American Civil Liberties Union
- Feminist Majority Foundation
- Planned Parenthood
