= 2026 Alabama Amendment 4 =

2026 referendum

- November 3, 2026
- Broadcast The Star-Spangled Banner in Public Schools Amendment
County results
Yes
80–90%
70–80%
60–70%
50–60%
No
60–70%
50–60%

Alabama Amendment 4, also known as the Broadcast The Star-Spangled Banner in Public Schools Amendment, is a legislatively referred constitutional amendment that appeared on the ballot in the U.S. state of Alabama on November 3, 2026, concurrent with the 2026 United States elections.

== Background and impact ==
Amendment 4 proposes that public schools must broadcast the first stanza of The Star-Spangled Banner at least once per week. Republican state senator Gerald Allen introduced the bill, and it passed the Alabama Senate 22–5 in March 2026. It then passed the state house 75–27.

== Endorsements ==
Yes

State legislators

- Gerald Allen, state senator from the 21st district (2010–present)
No

Organizations

- ACLU of Alabama

== Results ==
Alabama Amendment 4
Choice
For
Against
Total

Source: Secretary of State of Alabama
