= 2026 Colorado Amendment 82 =

Amendment 82
- November 3, 2026
- Constitutional Right to Purchase and Sell Natural Gas
County results
Yes
80–90%
70–80%
60–70%
50–60%
No
70–80%
60–70%
50–60%

2026 Colorado Amendment 82 is a proposed amendment to the Colorado Constitution which would add language to protect the right of consumers to purchase and utilities to sell natural gas in Colorado. The measure is being put before voters as a part of the 2026 general election. As the ballot measure would add text to the state Constitution, it requires support from 55% of voters to pass.

== Background ==
Amendment 82 was referred to voters through citizen petition. It is one of eight measures put before Colorado voters in 2026 funded by conservative political group Advance Colorado. Natural gas is legal in Colorado, though supporters of the measure contend natural gas is under attack due to environmental initiatives in Colorado which require natural gas utilities in the state to reduce their emissions. The initiative is opposed by two groups, No Pollution in the Constitution and Vote Common Sense. Should the measure pass, it could limit the ability of state and local governments in Colorado to enforce natural gas related regulations.

== Contents ==
The proposition appeared on the ballot as follows:

Shall there be an amendment to the Colorado Constitution creating new law granting the right for consumers to purchase natural gas for cooking or heating in homes or businesses and for distributors and utilities to sell natural gas to consumers?

== Campaigns ==
=== Support ===
'Yes'

Newspapers

- The Colorado Springs Gazette

=== Opposition ===
'No'

Federal officials

- Michael Bennet, U.S. Senator
- John Hickenlooper, U.S. Senator
- Joe Neguse, U.S. representative from CO-02
- Jason Crow, U.S. representative from CO-06
- Brittany Pettersen, U.S. representative from CO-07

State officials

- Phil Weiser, Attorney General of Colorado

Newspapers

- The Denver Post

Organizations

- Colorado Working Families Party
- League of Women Voters of Colorado
- Sierra Club Colorado Chapter

== Results ==
Results will begin being published after polls close on November 3, 2026 at 7:00 pm. Amendment 82 requires a 55% majority to pass.

Amendment 82
Choice
For
Against
Total

== See also ==
- 2026 United States ballot measures
- List of Colorado ballot measures
