= November 2026 Alabama Amendment 1 =

2026 referendum

- November 3, 2026
- Alabama Require Special Election for Lieutenant Governor Vacancies Amendment
County results
Yes
70–80%
60–70%
50–60%

Alabama Amendment 1, also known as the Alabama Require Special Election for Lieutenant Governor Vacancies Amendment, is a legislatively referred constitutional amendment that appeared on the ballot in the U.S. state of Alabama on November 3, 2026, concurrent with the 2026 United States elections.

== Background and impact ==
In Alabama, the office of lieutenant governor is an elected position. The Constitution of Alabama calls for a special election to be held in the event of a vacancy only if both the governor of Alabama and the lieutenant governor leave their office vacant for any reason more than 60 days prior to a regular general election. If only the lieutenant governor's office is vacant, then it remains vacant until the end of the term.

Senate Bill 271 was sponsored by Sam Givhan. The bill placed a constitutional amendment on the ballot to require special elections to be held to fill a vacancy in the lieutenant governor's office if the vacancy occurs within the first two years of their term. It also allows for the Alabama Legislature to set the salary of the lieutenant governor and officers of the legislature via joint resolution, and that any travel expenditures for legislators be approved by a legislative officer. It passed the state legislature unanimously and was placed on the ballot.

== Results ==
Alabama Amendment 1
Choice
For
Against
Total

Source: Secretary of State of Alabama
