= 2026 Colorado Proposition 134 =

Statewide referendum in Colorado, US

Proposition 134
- November 3, 2026
- Male and Female Participation in School and Collegiate Sports
- Reporting: 99% as of November 16, 2026, 11:35 a.m. MST
- Outcome: Passed

Results
Choice	Votes	%
Yes	1,379,283	52.16%
No	1,265,157	47.84%
- Source: Associated Press

Proposition 134 was a statutory ballot measure in Colorado during the 2026 general election. The proposition would require school and college sports programs in the state to designate sports teams according to students' sex based on their "biological reproductive system" or coeducational. This would prohibit transgender athletes from participating in gendered school sports teams from the K–12 to college levels.

== Contents ==
The text of the proposition appeared on the ballot as follows:

Shall there be a change to the Colorado Revised Statutes creating new law restricting participation in all K-12 and collegiate school sports based on the participant’s sex as determined by certain aspects of their biological reproductive system, and, in connection therewith, requiring a school, institution of higher education, or athletic association to designate each school or intramural athletic team or sport as male, female, or coeducational; only allowing participants to compete on the team or sport of their designated sex or to compete on a coeducational team; creating an exception to allow a female to participate on a male-designated team or sport if there is no female team available; prohibiting a government entity, licensing or accrediting organization, or athletic association from entertaining a complaint, opening an investigation, or taking other adverse action against a school for maintaining separate teams or sports for females; and providing the commissioner of education with the authority to enforce the proposed initiative for K-12 school districts?

== Background ==
The effort to put Proposition 134 on the ballot was led by Erin Lee, described by Colorado Newsline as a "prominent anti-LGBTQ activist", and her organization Protect Kids Colorado.

== See also ==
- 2026 Colorado Proposition 135
- 2026 Washington Initiative 638
