= 2026 Louisiana Amendment 4 =

2026 referendum

- November 3, 2026
- Gubernatorial Two-Term Lifetime Limit Amendment

Results
Choice	Votes	%
Yes	801,188	55.93%
No	631,390	44.07%
Valid votes	1,432,578	100.00%
Invalid or blank votes	0	0.00%
Total votes	1,432,578	100.00%
- Results by parish Yes: 50–60% 60–70% No: 50–60%

The 2026 Louisiana Amendment 4 is a legislatively referred constitutional amendment that appeared on the ballot in the U.S. state of Louisiana on November 3, 2026 and was approved by voters.

== Background ==
At the time of this election, Louisiana had a consecutive term-limit where governors can serve two consecutive terms, then wait an election to run again. This amendment makes a lifetime term-limit after 2 terms. It applies to all former governors and the incumbent, meaning Democrat John Bel Edwards and Republican Bobby Jindal will be ineligible from seeking a potential third non-consecutive term.
