= 2026 Alaska Measure 2 =

- November 3, 2026
- An Act Restoring Political Party Primaries, Ending Ranked-Choice General Elections, and Repealing Recent Campaign Finance Laws
- Outcome: Not passed

Results
Choice	Votes	%
Yes	123,095	46.48%
No	141,750	53.52%
Valid votes	264,845	100.00%
Invalid or blank votes	0	0.00%
Total votes	264,845	100.00%

Alaska Measure 2 was a ballot initiative that was voted on in the November 3, 2026, general election. The ballot measure failed to pass.

If enacted, it would have repealed Alaska's electoral system of ranked-choice voting, nonpartisan blanket primaries, and campaign disclosure rules which were enacted by Alaska Measure 2 from 2020. It would have returned the state to partisan primaries, plurality voting, and made the Governor of Alaska run separately from the Lieutenant Governor of Alaska. A similar measure in 2024 failed by a margin of 0.24%.

== Ballot language ==
The ballot measure reads as follows:

An Act Restoring Political Party Primaries, Ending Ranked-Choice General Elections, and Repealing Recent Campaign Finance Laws

This act would get rid of open primary elections, where all candidates appear on one ballot. It would also get rid of ranked-choice general elections. It would bring back political party primaries and single-choice general elections. It would also repeal certain campaign finance rules that were added by a 2020 ballot measure.

Elections would occur as they did before open primaries and ranked choice voting. In the primary election, voters would choose a party's ballot, unless prohibited by the party's bylaws. They would only vote for candidates on that ballot. The winning candidate from each primary would be the party's nominee. In the general election, voters would vote for only one candidate in each race. The candidate with the most votes would win. Party petitions, special runoff elections, and other processes would return. Candidates for governor and lieutenant governor would run separately in political party primaries and then together in the general election.

This act would also repeal campaign finance rules that were passed in 2020. It would remove the limits on donations to joint campaigns for governor and lieutenant governor. It would remove limits and disclosure rules under current law, including for digital ads, out-of-state donations, undisclosed donations, and the true source of donations. It would change the meaning of a campaign expenditure and remove some fines.

Should this initiative become law?

== Endorsements ==
Yes

Executive officials

- Donald Trump, president of the United States (2017–2021, 2025–present) (Republican)

Statewide officials

- Mike Dunleavy, governor of Alaska (2018–present) (Republican)
- Craig Campbell, former lieutenant governor of Alaska (2009–2010) (Republican)
- Loren Leman, former lieutenant governor of Alaska (2002–2006) (Republican)
- Mead Treadwell, former lieutenant governor of Alaska (2010–2014) (Republican)

State representatives

- Jamie Allard, state representative from the 23rd district (2023–present) (Republican)

Party officials

- Carmela Warfield, chair of the Alaska Republican Party (Republican)

Individuals

- Al Gross, orthopedic surgeon and Independent candidate for US Senate in 2020 (Independent)
- Bernadette Wilson, waste management company founder and Republican candidate for governor (Republican)
No

State legislators

- Tom Begich, former senate minority leader (2019–2023) from district J (2017–2023) (Democratic)
- Cathy Giessel, senate majority leader (2023–present) from district E (2023–present) (Note: Giessel previously represented district P from 2011 to 2013 and district N from 2013 to 2021.) (Republican)
- Lesil McGuire, former state senator from district K (2007–2017) (Republican)

Labor unions

- National Education Association-Alaska
- United Auto Workers

Organizations

- Alaska Federation of Natives
- First Alaskans Institute
- League of Women Voters of Alaska
- Sealaska Corporation

Political parties

- Alaska Libertarian Party

Newspapers

- Anchorage Daily News

== Polling ==
Poll source	Date(s) administered	Sample size (Note: Key: A – all adults RV – registered voters LV – likely voters V – unclear)	Margin of error	Yes	No	Other	Undecided
Data for Progress (D)	October 8–16, 2026	694 (LV)	± 4.0%	48%	48%	1% (Note: "I would skip voting on this initiative" with 1%)	2%
Alaska Survey Research	October 1–3, 2026	1,512 (LV)	± 3.0%	47%	53%	–	–
Fabrizio Ward (R)/ Impact Research (D) (Note: Poll sponsored by AARP)	September 8–11, 2026	800 (LV)	± 3.5%	44%	47%	–	9%

== Results ==
Choice	Votes	%
For	124,631	46.38
Against	144,098	53.62
Total	268,729	100.00
Valid votes	268,729	94.83
Invalid/blank votes	14,660	5.17
Total votes	283,389	100.00
Registered voters/turnout	605,433	46.81

== See also ==
- 2026 United States ballot measures
- Ranked-choice voting in the United States

== Notes ==
Partisan clients
