= 2026 Colorado Amendment 87 =

Statewide referendum in Colorado, US

Amendment 87
- November 3, 2026
- Graduated Income Tax

Results
Choice	Votes	%
Yes	1,346,939	51.55%
No	1,266,128	48.45%
Total votes	2,613,067	100.00%
County results
Yes
60–70%
50–60%
No
80–90%
70–80%
60–70%
50–60%

2026 Colorado Amendment 87 was a combined initiated constitutional amendment and state statute that appeared on the November 3, 2026, ballot in the US state of Colorado. The measure will replace Colorado's flat income tax with a graduated income tax system, where taxpayers are subject to different rates on different portions of their earnings.

== Background ==
The amendment was backed by the Bell Policy Center, a Denver-based liberal think tank, and Protect Colorado's Future, an organizing coalition. The initiative qualified for the ballot after meeting the minimum requirements of at least 125,000 voter signatures in support, with the signatures of at least 2 percent of the voters in each of the state's 35 state senate districts.

Colorado is one of 15 US states with a flat income tax rate. The state previously used a graduated income tax rate, switching to the flat rate in 1987.

== Contents ==
The proposed amendment appeared on the ballot as follows:

Shall state taxes be increased $2.7 billion annually, in order to increase or improve levels of public services, including k-12 public school education, health care, and early child care and education services, by an amendment to the Colorado constitution and a change to the Colorado revised statutes repealing existing law and creating new law to replace the uniform state income tax rate with a graduated income tax structure, and, in connection therewith, amending the taxpayer’s bill of rights to eliminate the constitutional requirement for all taxable net income to be taxed at one rate with no added tax on income; establishing various income tax rates based on the amount of taxable income earned by individuals, estates, trusts, and corporations, while maintaining the current 4.4% tax on income from the sale of a principal residence, which will result in the estimated change in income taxes owed by individuals as identified in the following table; and authorizing the state to retain and spend any increased revenue from the new tax structure, as a voter-approved revenue change, to supplement current levels of funding for k-12 public school education, health care, and early child care and education programs?

== Impact ==
The amendment will raise income taxes on individuals and businesses earning more than $506,000 in annual taxable income. The Bell Policy Center has claimed that the amendment will lower income tax for 97 percent of Colorado residents and 95 percent of Colorado businesses.

=== New tax rates ===
As voters approved Amendment 87, the state will switch from a 4.4 percent flat income tax rate to a graduated income tax system using the following marginal tax rates:

Federal taxable income	Marginal tax rate
<$25,000	3.7%
$25,000 – $100,000	4.2%
$100,000 – $500,000	4.4%
$500,000 – $750,000	7.4%
$750,000 – $1,000,000	7.9%
$1,000,000+	8.4%

Under the graduated income tax system, taxpayers will be subject to different rates on different portions of their earnings. A resident with $400,000 in federal taxable income will pay 3.70 percent on the amount up to $25,000, 4.20 percent on the amount greater than $25,000 up to $100,000, and 4.40 percent on the amount greater than $100,000.

== Endorsements ==
Yes

U.S. senators

- Michael Bennet, Colorado (2009–present) (Democratic)

U.S. representatives

- Jason Crow, CO-06 (2019–present) (Democratic)
- Diana DeGette, CO-01 (1997–present) (Democratic)
- Joe Neguse, CO-02 (2019–present) (Democratic)
- Brittany Pettersen, CO-02 (2023–present) (Democratic)

Statewide officials

- Dave Young, treasurer of Colorado (2019–present) (Democratic)

State legislators

- Judy Amabile, state senator from the 18th district (2025–present) (Democratic)
- Jeff Bridges, state senator from the 26th district (2019–present) (Democratic)
- Kyle Brown, state representative from the 12th district (2023–present) (Democratic)
- Manny Rutinel, former state representative from the 32nd district (2023–2026) (Democratic)
- Emily Sirota, state representative from the 9th district (2019–present) (Democratic)

Individuals

- Melat Kiros, graduate student and former attorney (Democratic)

Labor unions

- SEIU Colorado

Organizations

- League of Women Voters of Colorado
- ProgressNow Colorado

Government bodies

- Boulder County Board of Commissioners

Political parties

- Colorado Democratic Party
No

Executive branch officials

- Ken Salazar, former ambassador to Mexico (2021–2025) (Democratic)

U.S. senators

- John Hickenlooper, Colorado (2021–present) (Democratic)

Statewide officials

- Jared Polis, governor of Colorado (2019–present) (Democratic)
- Phil Weiser, attorney general of Colorado (2019–present) (Democratic)

Organizations

- Americans for Prosperity
- Independence Institute
- National Federation of Independent Business

Newspapers

- The Colorado Springs Gazette
- The Denver Gazette
- The Wall Street Journal

== See also ==
- 2026 United States ballot measures
- List of Colorado ballot measures
