= 2024 Nevada Question 7 =

Proposed amendment to the Nevada Constitution

- November 5, 2024
- Require Voter Identification Initiative

Results
Choice	Votes	%
Yes	1,031,153	73.23%
No	376,873	26.77%
Total votes	1,408,026	100.00%
County results
Yes
80–90%
70–80%
60–70%

2024 Nevada Question 7 was a constitutional amendment for the state of Nevada in the United States that sought to amend the constitution to require that Nevada residents present a form of photo ID to verify their identity while voting in person, or to verify their identity using the last four digits of their driver's license or social security number when voting by mail.

The question appeared on the November 5th, 2024 ballot in Nevada and was approved with 73.23% voting Yes. As Question 7 was approved in 2024, a second vote will be held on November 3, 2026. (Note: Nevada requires initiated constitutional amendments to be approved in two even-numbered election years, so this question has been certified for the 2026 ballot.)

== Background ==
The constitutional amendment was initially proposed by Repair the Vote PAC, who collected the (then) minimum of 135,561 signatures required to undergo the signature validation process and be put on the ballot.

The campaign for stricter voter ID laws grew with Nevada's expansion of voter access in recent years, namely the introduction of automatic voter registration, universal mail ballots and other policies designed to make it easier for people to participate in elections.

== Question 7 language ==
"Should the Nevada Constitution be amended to require voters to either present photo identification to verify their identity when voting in-person or to provide certain personal information to verify their identity when voting by mail ballot?"

== Endorsements ==
Yes

Executive branch officials

- Donald Trump, President of the United States (2017–2021, 2025–present) (Republican)

Statewide officials

- Joe Lombardo, governor of Nevada (2023–present) (Republican)

Newspapers

- Las Vegas Review-Journal
No

Organizations

- ACLU of Nevada
- Planned Parenthood Votes Nevada
- Progressive Leadership Alliance of Nevada

Newspapers

- Las Vegas Sun

== Results ==
Require Photo ID to Vote
Choice	Votes	%
For	1,031,153	73.23
Against	376,873	26.77
Total	1,408,026	100.00

=== By county ===
County	Yes	No	Total
County	%	%	#
Carson City	72%	26%	29,996
Churchill	83%	17%	13,121
Clark	73%	27%	970,706
Douglas	79%	21%	34,074
Elko	85%	15%	21,832
Esmeralda	80%	20%	446
Eureka	87%	13%	1,006
Humboldt	84%	16%	7,820
Lander	86%	14%	2,687
Lincoln	82%	18%	2,399
Lyon	81%	19%	32,323
Mineral	78%	22%	2,236
Nye	82%	18%	26,446
Pershing	80%	20%	2,233
Storey	80%	20%	3,011
Washoe	70%	30%	253,426
White Pine	84%	16%	4,264
Totals	73.23%	26.77%	1,408,026

== See also ==
- 2024 United States ballot measures
