= 2026 Alabama Amendment 3 =

2026 referendum

- November 3, 2026
- Require Pledge of Allegiance and Allow Student-Led Prayer in Public Schools Amendment
County results
Yes
80–90%
70–80%
60–70%
50–60%
No
60–70%
50–60%

Alabama Amendment 3, also known as the Require Pledge of Allegiance and Allow Student-Led Prayer in Public Schools Amendment, is a legislatively referred constitutional amendment that appeared on the ballot in the U.S. state of Alabama on November 3, 2026, concurrent with the 2026 United States elections.

== Background and impact ==
Amendment 3 would require local boards of education to adopt policy that schools must play the Pledge of Allegiance at the beginning of the school day and allow student-initiated and student-led prayer in classrooms. Alabama law already requires that the Pledge of Allegiance be played at the beginning of a school day, though it is not part of the Constitution of Alabama. The amendment was introduced by Republican state representative Reed Ingram and passed the Alabama House of Representatives 94-4. It then passed the Alabama Senate 30-0.

During the legislative process, parts of the bill that originally threatened a 25% reduction in state funding for schools that did not comply was removed. It is not clear how the amendment would change or challenge federal law, according to the Alabama Reflector and Yellowhammer News.

== Endorsements ==
No

Organizations

- ACLU of Alabama

== Results ==
Alabama Amendment 4
Choice
For
Against
Total

Source: Secretary of State of Alabama
