= 2026 Kansas Elections for Supreme Court Justices Amendment =

- August 4, 2026
- Elections for Supreme Court Justices Amendment

Results
Choice	Votes	%
Yes	243,915	38.60%
No	387,951	61.40%
Valid votes	631,866	100.00%
Invalid or blank votes	0	0.00%
Total votes	631,866	100.00%
- County results No: 50–60% 60–70% 70–80% 80–90% Yes: 50–60% 60–70% 70–80%

The Kansas Elections for Supreme Court Justices Amendment was a legislatively referred constitutional amendment that appeared on the ballot of the U.S. state of Kansas on August 4, 2026. The measure was rejected by a 20-point margin.

== Background ==
Justices on the Kansas Supreme Court are currently appointed by the Governor of Kansas through recommendations by the Kansas Supreme Court Nominating Commission. The amendment would create elections and six-year terms for justices, to be voted on statewide. It has been criticized for the impact it will have on the impartiality of justices elected to the court. It passed the legislature with the support of Republicans.

The current Supreme Court Justice nominating system entails that attorneys licensed in the state by the Kansas Supreme Court elect 5 commissioners for the Nominating Commission, and the governor chooses the other 4 non-lawyer commissioners. There is one lawyer and non-lawyer from each of the state's four congressional districts, plus one lawyer who serves as chairperson. Lawyers are elected by other lawyers within their congressional districts. The chairperson is elected by lawyers statewide. When there is a vacancy on the bench, the Supreme Court Nominating Commission reviews applications and conducts interviews of nominees.

The nomination commission then sends three of their top choices to the governor, who picks one of them. After a new justice serves one year on the court, they must stand for a retention vote in the next general election to remain in the position. If retained, the state's Supreme Court justices would face a retention vote by popular vote every six years.

== Endorsements ==
Yes

Federal judicial officials

- Anthony Powell, judge of the United States District Court for the District of Kansas (2026–present) and former solicitor general of Kansas (2022–2026)

Statewide officials

- Jeff Colyer, former governor of Kansas (2018–2019) (Republican)
- Kris Kobach, attorney general of Kansas (2023–present) (Republican)

Judicial officials

- Bob Edmunds, former associate justice of the North Carolina Supreme Court (2001–2017) (Republican)

State legislators

- Ty Masterson, president of the Kansas Senate (2021–present) from the 16th district (2009–present) (Republican)
- Mike Thompson, senator from the 10th district (2020–present) (Republican)

Organizations

- Americans for Prosperity Kansas
- Kansas Chamber of Commerce
- Kansas Policy Institute

Political parties

- Kansas Republican Party
No

Statewide officials

- Bill Graves, former governor of Kansas (1995–2003) (Republican)
- Laura Kelly, governor of Kansas (2019–present) (Democratic)
- Kathleen Sebelius, former governor of Kansas (2003–2009) (Democratic)

Judicial officials

- Carol Beier, former justice of the Kansas Supreme Court (2003–2020)
- Lee A. Johnson, former justice of the Kansas Supreme Court (2007–2019)
- Lawton Nuss, former chief justice of the Kansas Supreme Court (2010–2019)

Labor unions

- American Federation of Teachers Kansas

Organizations

- ACLU Kansas
- Kansas 50501 movement
- Kansas Bar Association
- Kansas Women Attorneys Association
- Planned Parenthood Great Plains
- Southeast Kansas Democratic Socialists of America
- Unite for Reproductive & Gender Equity

Newspapers

- The Kansas City Star

== Results ==
Kansas Elections for Supreme Court Justices Amendment
Choice	Votes	%
For	243,915	38.60
Against	387,951	61.40
Total	631,866	100.00
Source: Secretary of State of Kansas
