= 2026 Kansas Citizenship Voting Requirement Amendment =

- November 3, 2026
- Kansas Citizenship Voting Requirement Amendment
- County results

The Kansas Citizenship Voting Requirement Amendment is a legislatively referred constitutional amendment that will appear on the ballot in the U.S. state of Kansas on November 3, 2026. If approved, it would amend Article 5, Section 1 of the Kansas Constitution to clarify the prohibition on non-citizens voting, along with the requirement that citizens to be eighteen years old and reside in the area in which they seek to vote. A yes vote would be in favor of amending the Kansas Constitution, and a no vote would be against amending the constitution.

== Endorsements ==
Yes

State representatives

- Pat Proctor, state representative from the 41st district (2021–present) (Republican)

Political parties

- Kansas Republican Party
No

State representatives

- Kirk Haskins, state representative from the 53rd district (2023–present) (Democratic)

Organizations

- American Civil Liberties Union
- League of Women Voters
