= 2026 North Carolina Require Voter Identification Amendment =

Proposed amendment to the North Carolina Constitution

- November 3, 2026
- Require Voter Identification Amendment

Results
Choice	Votes	%
Yes	2,463,308	59.60%
No	1,670,068	40.40%

The Require Voter Identification Amendment, officially SB 921, was a constitutional amendment that appeared on the November 3, 2026, ballot in the US state of North Carolina. The measure, which was approved by a majority of voters, will amend the state constitution to require photo ID to cast a ballot for all voters, not just those voting in person.

North Carolina state law already requires absentee voters, including military and overseas voters, to provide a photocopy of their photo ID and the signatures of two witnesses.

== Background ==
The amendment was originally passed by the State Senate in a vote of 30-19, along partisan lines, with Republicans in favor and Democrats opposed. The House passed the bill with all 72 Republicans in favor. Among House Democrats, 45 voted against the bill, and one joined Republicans voting in favor of the bill.

In 2018, voters approved a constitutional amendment to require photo ID for in-person voting in North Carolina. The amendment reads, "Voters offering to vote in person shall present photographic identification before voting. The General Assembly shall enact general laws governing the requirements of such photographic identification, which may include exceptions." A court case challenging the legitimacy of the 2018 amendment is still ongoing as of 2026.

== Ballot language ==
"FOR or AGAINST: Constitutional amendment to require all voters, not just those presenting to vote in person, to present photo identification before voting."

== Endorsements and opposition ==
Yes

State legislators

- Warren Daniel, SD-46 (2013–present) (Republican)
- Paul Newton, former majority leader of the North Carolina Senate (2023–2025) from SD-34 (2017–2025) (Republican)
No

State legislators

- Mary Harrison, HD-61 (2005–present) (Democratic)

Organizations

- Common Cause

== Results ==
Require Voter Identification Amendment
Choice	Votes	%
For	2,463,308	59.60
Against	1,670,068	40.40
Total	4,133,376	100.00
Source: Ballotpedia

== See also ==
- 2026 United States ballot measures
