= November 2026 Alabama Amendment 2 =

2026 referendum

- November 3, 2026
- School District Consolidation Process Amendment
County results
Yes
60–70%
50–60%
No
60–70%
50–60%

Alabama Amendment 2, also known as the School District Consolidation Process Amendment, is a legislatively referred constitutional amendment that appeared on the ballot in the U.S. state of Alabama on November 3, 2026, concurrent with the 2026 United States elections.

== Background and impact ==
Counties in Alabama have separate school systems that cannot be consolidated. Amendment 2 would establish a process to consolidate two or more county school districts into a single board of education. It would also require the Alabama State Board of Education to conduct a study on proposed consolidations to determine how it would effect various processes involving the school system, such as student transportation and community identity. The process would require 25% of registered voters in the affected counties to submit a written protest within 30 days of the merger authorization to require a referendum.

The bill was sponsored by Republican state representative Terri Collins, and passed the Alabama House of Representatives by a vote of 96-2. It then passed the Alabama Senate unanimously.

== Endorsements ==
Yes

State legislators

- Terri Collins, state representative from the 8th district (2010–present)
No

Organizations

- League of Women Voters

== Results ==
Alabama Amendment 2
Choice
For
Against
Total

Source: Secretary of State of Alabama
