= 2026 Missouri Amendment 4 =

- August 4, 2026
- Shall the Missouri Constitution be amended to: Modify current requirements that a statewide majority of voters may approve initiative petitions to amend the constitution; Require a majority of voters in each congressional district to approve initiative petitions to amend the constitution; and; Make available to each voter the full text of initiative petitions with their ballot?

Results
Choice	Votes	%
Yes	275,040	19.68%
No	1,122,748	80.32%
Valid votes	1,397,788	100.00%
Invalid or blank votes	0	0.00%
Total votes	1,397,788	100.00%
County results
No
90–100%
80–90%
70–80%
60–70%
50–60%

Missouri Amendment 4 was a legislatively referred constitutional amendment that appeared on the ballot in the U.S. state of Missouri on August 4, 2026, concurrent with primary elections in Missouri. The measure was overwhelmingly rejected by voters.

== Background ==
In Missouri, citizen-initiated constitutional amendments are approved by voters with a simple majority. Amendment 4 would have required these citizen-led amendments to be approved in each of Missouri's eight congressional districts.

Some measures, such as Medicaid expansion in 2020, abortion rights in 2024, and a minimum wage expansion in 2024 would have failed if this proposal was in effect.

== Endorsements ==
Yes

U.S. representatives

- Mark Alford, MO-4 (Republican)
- Eric Burlison, MO-7 (Republican)
- Sam Graves, MO-6 (Republican)

U.S. senators

- Eric Schmitt, (2023-present) (Republican)

Statewide officials

- Catherine Hanaway, attorney general of Missouri (2025-present) (Republican)
- Mike Kehoe, governor of Missouri (2025-present) (Republican)

State representatives

- Bishop Davidson, state representative from the 130th district (2021–present) (Republican)
- Ed Lewis, state representative from the 6th district (2021–present) (Republican)
- Cathy Jo Loy, state representative from the 163rd district (2025–present) (Republican)
- Bill Lucas, state representative from the 115th district (Republican)
- Matthew Overcast, state representative from the 155th district (2025–present) (Republican)
- John Simmons, state representative from the 109th district (2019–2023, 2025–present) (Republican)

Labor unions

- St. Louis Police Officers Association

Organizations

- Americans for Prosperity Missouri
- Missouri Farm Bureau
- Missouri Young Republicans

Political parties

- Missouri Republican Party
No

State representatives

- Marty Joe Murray, state representative from the 78th district (2025–present) (Democratic)
- Jonathan Patterson, speaker of the Missouri House of Representatives (2025–present) from the 30th district (2019–present) (Republican)
- Crystal Quade, former state representative from the 132nd district (2017–2025) (Democratic)
- Kathy Steinhoff, state representative from the 45th district (2023–present) (Democratic)
- Emily Weber, state representative from the 24th district (2021–present) (Democratic)

State senators

- Doug Beck, state senator from the 1st district (2021–present) (Democratic)
- Lincoln Hough, state senator from the 30th district (2019–present) (Republican)
- Stephen Webber, state senator from the 19th district (2025–present) (Democratic)

Statewide officials

- John Danforth, former attorney general of Missouri (1969-1976) (Republican)
- Jason Kander, former secretary of state of Missouri (2013-2017) (Democratic)

Local officials

- Quinton Lucas, mayor of Kansas City (2019–present) (Democratic)

Labor unions

- Missouri AFL-CIO
- Missouri National Education Association
- Missouri Realtors

Organizations

- American Civil Liberties Union
- Fairness Project
- Kansas City NORML
- League of Women Voters of Missouri
- Metropolitan Congregations United
- Missouri Coalition for the Environment
- Missouri Jobs with Justice
- Missouri NAACP State Conference
- Missouri National Organization for Women
- National Council of Jewish Women St. Louis
- National Women's Political Caucus of Missouri
- PROMO

Political parties

- Missouri Democratic Party

== Results ==
Missouri Amendment 4
Choice	Votes	%
For	275,040	19.68
Against	1,122,748	80.32
Total	1,397,788	100.00
Source: Secretary of State of Missouri
