= May 2026 Alabama Amendment 2 =

2026 referendum

- May 19, 2026
- Prohibit Lowering District Attorney Compensation During Term of Office Amendment

Results
Choice	Votes	%
Yes	474,839	57.75%
No	347,379	42.25%
Valid votes	822,218	100.00%
Invalid or blank votes	0	0.00%
Total votes	822,218	100.00%
- County results Yes: 50–60% 60–70% 70–80% No: 50–60%

Alabama Amendment 2, also known as the Prohibit Lowering District Attorney Compensation During Term of Office Amendment is a legislatively referred constitutional amendment that appeared on the ballot in the U.S. state of Alabama on May 19, 2026. The amendment passed.

== Background ==
Alabama House Bill 354 was introduced by representative Jim Hill in the Alabama House of Representatives. The goal of the bill was to outlaw salary cuts for judges and district attorneys during their term of office. It passed the house by a vote of 101–0. It passed the Alabama Senate by a vote of 29–1, and was signed by governor Kay Ivey on May 6, 2025.

== Impact ==
Once passed, the Constitution of Alabama was amended to explicitly forbid salary cuts of district attorneys during their tenure in office. It also modernized language used in the amended section.

== Endorsements ==
Yes

State legislators

- Jim Hill, state representative from the 50th district (2014–present) (Republican)

== Results ==
Alabama Amendment 2
Choice	Votes	%
For	474,839	57.75
Against	347,379	42.25
Total	822,218	100.00
Source: Secretary of State of Alabama
