= 2026 Alaska Measure 3 =

- November 3, 2026
- 2026 Alaska Ballot Measure 3, Citizenship Voting Requirement Initiative (2026)

Alaska Measure 3 also known as 25USCV is a ballot initiative that was voted on in the November 3, 2026, general election.

If enacted, the measure will amend state law to state that "only a person who is a citizen of the United States" may vote in any election. This change is adding the word "only" to the already-existing "a person may vote at any election who is a citizen of the United States." The initiative would not change who can can vote, but would act to clarify the language.

== Ballot language ==
The ballot measure reads as follows:

Only a person who

(1) is a citizen of the United States;

(2) is 18 years of age or older;

(3) has been a resident of the state and of the house district in which the person seeks to vote for at least 30 days just before the election; and

(4) has registered before the election as required under AS 15.07 and is not registered to vote in another jurisdiction may vote at any election

== Endorsements ==
Alaskans for Citizen Voting (ACV) supported this measure, citing language clarity. ACV is a chapter of Americans for Citizen Voting, an organization that advances citizen-only initiatives across the country. Former state legislators John Coghill, Josh Revak, and Mike Chenault, who all served as Republicans, sponsored this as well and support ACV. Wisconsin/Illinois billionaire Richard Uihlein spent $800,000, making him the primary support of this campaign, compared to $100,000 from ACV.

In opposition to the measure, Representative Alyse Galvi claims that the change would be redundant based on Alaska's already-existing citizenship requirement. Others in opposition say it is a political stunt to draw conservative voters to the polls. Although the Alaska Voter Guide takes no position on the measure, it qualifies the measure as "an attempt to scare people into thinking noncitizens are voting in our elections when they aren't."

== See also ==
- 2026 United States ballot measures
