= 2026 Nevada Question 7 =

- November 3, 2026
- Require Voter Identification Initiative
- Reporting: 85.7% as of 7:17 a.m. PST
- Outcome: Passed

Results
Choice	Votes	%
Yes	597,624	62.32%
No	361,262	37.68%

Nevada Question 7, officially the Voter Identification Initiative, is an initiated constitutional amendment that will appear on the ballot in the U.S. state of Nevada on November 3, 2026, concurrent with the 2026 United States elections.

The amendment seeks to alter the constitution to require that Nevada residents present a form of photo identification to verify their identity while voting in person, or to verify their identity using the last four digits of their driver's license or Social Security number when voting by mail.

== Background ==
Question 7 was approved in 2024 with 73.23% voting 'Yes'. As Nevada requires initiated constitutional amendments to be approved in two even-numbered election years, it was then certified for the 2026 ballot.

== Endorsements ==
Yes

Executive branch officials

- Donald Trump, president of the United States (2017–2021, 2025–present) (Republican)

Statewide officials

- Joe Lombardo, governor of Nevada (2023–present) (Republican)

== Polling ==
Poll source	Date(s) administered	Sample size (Note: Key: A – all adults RV – registered voters LV – likely voters V – unclear)	Margin of error	Yes	No	Other	Undecided
Noble Predictive Insights	October 26–28, 2026	487 (LV)	± 4.44%	58%	37%	1% (Note: "Wouldn't vote" with 1%)	4%
Noble Predictive Insights	September 22–26, 2026	800 (RV)	± 3.5%	65%	24%	3% (Note: "Wouldn't vote" with 3%)	8%
Noble Predictive Insights	September 22–26, 2026	708 (LV)	± 3.7%	67%	25%	2% (Note: "Wouldn't vote" with 2%)	6%
