= 2024 Alaska Ballot Measure 2 =

- November 5, 2024
- An Act Restoring Political Party Primaries and Single-Choice General Elections

Results
Choice	Votes	%
Yes	160,230	49.88%
No	160,973	50.12%

Yes
80–90%
70–80%
60–70%
50–60%
No
90–100%
80–90%
70–80%
60–70%
50–60%
Other
Tie
No data

Alaska Ballot Measure 2 was a ballot initiative that was voted on in the November 5, 2024, general election. The ballot measure narrowly failed to pass.

If enacted, it would have repealed Alaska's electoral system of ranked-choice voting and nonpartisan blanket primaries, which was enacted by Alaska Measure 2 from 2020, and return the state to partisan primaries and plurality voting. A similar ballot measure that would repeal ranked-choice voting as well as eliminate campaign finance provisions that are intended to reduce the influence of dark money in Alaska elections was rejected by voters in the 2026 United States elections.

== Background ==
The 2020 measure established ranked-choice voting and nonpartisan top-four primaries for all Alaskan state and federal elections except presidential primaries. It passed with a narrow margin of 1%, with supporters of the measure outspending opponents by more than 10 to 1.

In the 2022 Alaska's at-large congressional district special election, Democrat Mary Peltola won over the two Republicans who had advanced to the general election, Nick Begich III and Sarah Palin. This, along with the nonpartisan primary preventing a primary challenge to centrist Republican senator Lisa Murkowski in 2022, led to Republicans increasingly opposing the new system.

Supporters of the initiative have said that Alaska's voting system should be repealed due to being confusing and vulnerable to manipulation, while opponents have said that the system should remain in place due to being more inclusive and giving voters more choices.

Opponents of the measure outspent supporters 100 to 1.

== Endorsements ==
Yes

Statewide officials

- Craig Campbell, former lieutenant governor of Alaska (2009–2010)
- Loren Leman, former lieutenant governor of Alaska (2002-2006)

State senators

- Mike Shower, state senator from district O (2018–2025)
No

U.S. senators

- Lisa Murkowski, Alaska (2002-present)

Newspapers

- Anchorage Daily News

Organizations

- Alaska Federation of Natives

== Polling ==
Poll source	Date(s) administered	Sample size (Note: Key: A – all adults RV – registered voters LV – likely voters V – unclear)	Margin of error	For	Against
Alaska Survey Research (Note: Poll asked whether voters would support a hypothetical initiative to repeal ranked choice voting.)	January 12–18, 2023	1,397 (RV)	± 3.0%	53%	47%

== Results ==
Choice	Votes	%
For	160,230	49.88
Against	160,973	50.12
Total	321,203	100.00
Valid votes	321,203	95.66
Invalid/blank votes	14,564	4.34
Total votes	335,767	100.00
Registered voters/turnout	610,272	55.02

== See also ==
- 2024 United States ballot measures
- Ranked-choice voting in the United States
