= First Alaskans Institute =

US-based non-profit foundation

The First Alaskans Institute is a non-profit foundation dedicated to developing the capacities of Alaska Natives and their communities to meet the educational, economic and social challenges of the future. The institute was formed in 2000, spurred by a $20 million pledge from the oil industry. With a Board of Trustees composed of current and former presidents and chairs of the Alaska Federation of Natives, the Institute is committed to promoting healthy Native communities through public policy analysis/research and leadership development. The current President/CEO is Apagruk Roy Agloinga.

== Alaska Native Policy Center ==
The Alaska Native Policy Center is a Native think tank of the First Alaskans Institute that provides information on the condition and needs of Native people and assists Natives in becoming actively involved in the issues that impact the future. The Policy Center has researched and published several reports, such as Alaska Native Perspectives, a survey of Native perceptions of public issues, Alaska Native K-12 Education Indicators Reports, a statistical review of Native educational performance; and Our Choices ~ Our Future, a compilation of data on Native population, health, economics and education.

== Leadership development ==
First Alaskans also focuses on empowering the next generation of Native leaders through various leadership development programs, such as an annual "Elders and Youth Conference during AFN Convention week"; an annual summer internship program that provides challenging job experiences, leadership discussions and networking opportunities; and a fellowship program that nurtures emerging policy makers and uses the instruments of democracy to create social change.

== See also ==
- Alaska Natives
