= 2026 Alaska Measure 1 =

- August 18, 2026
- An Act restoring campaign contribution limits for state and local office

Results
Choice	Votes	%
Yes	117,962	72.20%
No	45,418	27.80%
Valid votes	163,380	97.87%
Invalid or blank votes	3,551	2.13%
Total votes	166,931	100.00%
Registered voters/turnout	601,104	27.74%

Alaska Measure 1, the Establish Campaign Contribution Limits for State and Local Elections Initiative, was a ballot initiative that was voted on during the August 18, 2026 primary election. The amendment passed, with 72.20% of voters voting in favor.

== Background ==
In August 2006, Alaska passed the Campaign Finance Limits Initiative, which lowered the maximum amount that donors could give to political candidates, groups, and parties. In 2016, a group of donors and District 18 of the Alaska Republican Party filed a lawsuit against the new limits. The Ninth Circuit Court of Appeals initially upheld the law, but the ruling was vacated by the United States Supreme Court in 2019. In 2021, a federal panel of judges ruled 2-1 to overturn three of the four limits, leaving the $5,000 cap on donations from political parties to municipal candidates in place. After the ruling, Alaska had no limits on the amount of money that could be donated to political campaigns.

In 2026, the Alaska Legislature passed House Bill 16, a bill that would have instated the same limits as 2026's Measure 1. The Legislature had previously tried to pass similar bills in 2022 and 2024, but both were unsuccessful. House Bill 16 was vetoed by Governor Mike Dunleavy on July 9, 2026.

=== Impact ===
The measure instated new limits on the amount individuals and political parties could contribute. Individuals may contribute up to $2,000 per election cycle to candidates, and up to $4,000 to joint campaigns for governor and lieutenant governor. Groups may contribute up to $4,000 per election cycle to candidates, $5,000 to other groups and political parties, and $8,000 to joint campaigns for governor and lieutenant governor.

== Results ==
Choice	Votes	%
For	117,962	72.20
Against	45,418	27.80
Total	163,380	100.00
Valid votes	163,380	97.87
Invalid/blank votes	3,551	2.13
Total votes	166,931	100.00
Registered voters/turnout	601,104	27.77
Source: Alaska Division of Elections

== See also ==
- 2026 United States ballot measures
