= 2020 Alaska Measure 2 =

Measure 2
- November 3, 2020
- An Act Replacing the Political Party Primary with an Open Primary System and Ranked-Choice General Election, and Requiring Additional Campaign Finance Disclosures

Results
Choice	Votes	%
Yes	174,032	50.55%
No	170,251	49.45%
Valid votes	344,283	95.41%
Invalid or blank votes	16,569	4.59%
Total votes	360,852	100.00%
Registered voters/turnout	594,966	60.65%

Yes
90–100%
80–90%
70–80%
60–70%
50–60%
No
90–100%
80–90%
70–80%
60–70%
50–60%
Other
Tie
No data
- Source: Alaska Division of Elections

Alaska Measure 2 was a ballot initiative narrowly approved by voters in Alaska as part of the 2020 United States elections. The proposal switched Alaska's primary system to a non-partisan blanket primary. The top four candidates progress to the general election, which is conducted with ranked-choice voting. Voting for U.S. president will continue to utilize primaries based on political party, but ranked-choice voting will still be used in the general election. The initiative also requires additional disclosures of campaign financing.

In 2024, another Alaska Ballot Measure 2 was voted on by citizens as to whether to repeal this system and return to partisan primaries and plurality voting. The effort to repeal failed by an even narrower margin. Another attempt to repeal it in 2026, Alaska Measure 2 failed by a wider margin, with more than 53% voting to keep it.

== Background ==
The campaign for Alaska Measure 2 followed on political activist groups seeking to change the electoral rules in Alaska. Throughout the campaign a high volume of campaign funding came from sources outside Alaska. At the end of the campaign, the overwhelming majority of the money spent in the race was spent by groups in favor of the measure. In 2020 a high percentage of Alaskans identified as political independents.

== Contents ==
The proposal appeared on the ballot as follows:

An Act Replacing the Political Party Primary with an Open Primary System and Ranked-Choice General Election, and Requiring Additional Campaign Finance Disclosures

This act would get rid of the party primary system, and political parties would no longer select their candidates to appear on the general election ballot. Instead, this act would create an open nonpartisan primary where all candidates would appear on one ballot. Candidates could choose to have a political party preference listed next to their name or be listed as “undeclared” or “nonpartisan.” The four candidates with the most votes in the primary election would have their names placed on the general election ballot.

This act would establish ranked-choice voting for the general election. Voters would have the option to “rank” candidates in order of choice. Voters would rank their first choice candidate as “1”, second choice candidate as “2”, and so on. Voters “1” choice would be counted first. If no candidate received a majority after counting the first-ranked votes, then the candidate with the fewest “1” votes would be removed from counting. Those ballots that ranked the removed candidate as "1" would then be counted for the voters' “2” ranked candidate. This process would repeat until one candidate received a majority of the remaining votes. If voters still want to choose only one candidate, they can.

This act would also require additional disclosures for contributions to independent expenditure groups and relating to the sources of contributions. It would also require a disclaimer on paid election communications by independent expenditure groups funded by a majority of out of state money.

Should this initiative become law?

== Results ==
Choice	Votes	%
For	174,032	50.55
Against	170,251	49.45
Total	344,283	100.00
Valid votes	344,283	95.41
Invalid/blank votes	16,569	4.59
Total votes	360,852	100.00
Registered voters/turnout	594,966	60.65

The proposal was narrowly approved, with 50.55% of the vote.
