= 2026 Colorado elections =

Elections in the U.S. state of Colorado in 2026

The 2026 Colorado elections were held in the U.S. state of Colorado on November 3, 2026. Primary elections took place on June 30, 2026.

== Federal offices ==
=== United States Senate ===
One-term incumbent Democratic U.S. Senator John Hickenlooper was re-elected. He defeated republican state senator Mark Baisley.

=== United States House of Representatives ===
The democrats gained three seats in the House of Representatives. Eileen Laubacher defeated Lauren Boebert in the 4th district. Jessica Killin took the 5th district from the Republican incumbent, and was the first Democrat to win in the district. Manny Rutinel was also elected in the 8th district, unseating republican incumbent Gabe Evans.

== State offices ==
=== Governor ===
Two-term incumbent Democratic Governor Jared Polis was term-limited and ineligible to run for re-election. The lieutenant governor is elected on the same ticket.

=== Attorney General ===
Two-term incumbent Democratic Attorney General Phil Weiser was term-limited and ineligible to run for re-election.

=== Secretary of State ===
Two-term incumbent Democratic Secretary of State Jena Griswold was term-limited and ineligible to run for re-election.

=== State Treasurer ===
Two-term incumbent Democratic treasurer Dave Young is term-limited and ineligible to run for re-election.

=== State Board of Education ===
Three of nine seats on the Colorado State Board of Education are up for election in 2026.

=== State Board of Regents ===
Three of nine seats on the University of Colorado Board of Regents are up for election in 2026.
