= Legislative referral =

Process to put legislation up for a vote of the people

A legislative referral (or legislative referendum) is a referendum in which a legislature puts proposed legislation up for popular vote. This may either be voluntarily or, as is the case in many countries for a constitutional amendment, as a mandatory part of the procedure for passing a law. These referrals, depending on the location, can either amend a constitution or enact a change in statute. It is a form of direct democracy. In some places it is known as an authorities referendum, authorities plebiscite, government initiated referendum, or top-down referendum It may originate from the legislative branch, executive branch, or a combination of the two.

An instrument of direct democracy, it is in contrast to citizens (or "bottom-up") initiative that is initiated from the public. With initiated statutes and amendments, voters both initiate and decide on the change of law. In a legislative referral, they only approve or reject laws which their legislature votes to place before them.

== United States ==
Bond issues are a common type of legislatively referred ballot measure. In some states, such as Oregon, if the state legislature in both chambers vote to put a measure on the ballot, the governor is not allowed to veto their action.

=== State statute ===
Twenty-three American states have a provision for referring statutory measures to the public as a ballot measure.

States allowing legislatively referred statutes
- Arizona
- Arkansas
- California
- Colorado
- Delaware
- Illinois
- Kentucky
- Maine
- Maryland
- Massachusetts
- Michigan
- Missouri
- Montana
- Nebraska
- Nevada
- New Mexico
- North Dakota
- Ohio
- Oklahoma
- Oregon
- South Dakota
- Utah
- Washington

=== State constitutional amendment ===
Almost all legislatures in states and territories in the United States have the power to put state constitutional amendments to a referendum. In most cases these are mandatory referendums, meaning that a referendum is a legal requirement in order for the amendment to be ratified.

Delaware is the only state in which the people do not have the power to vote on constitutional amendments. Only the Delaware legislature may vote on amendments.

== See also ==
- Initiative
- Popular referendum
- Recall election
