= Anschütz =

Anschütz is a German surname, which may also appear as Anschutz, without the umlaut. It may refer to:

== People ==
=== Entertainment ===
- Heinrich Anschütz (1785–1865), German actor
- Karl Anschütz (c. 1814 – 1870), German-born musical director in New York City

=== Science ===
- Georg Anschütz (1886–1953), German psychologist
- Hermann Anschütz-Kaempfe (1872–1931), German scientist
- Richard Anschütz (1852–1937), German chemist

=== Sports ===
- Daniela Anschütz-Thoms (born 1974), German speed skater
- Helmut Anschütz (1932–2016), German fencer
- Jody Anschutz (born 1962), American professional golfer

=== Other people ===
- Ernst Anschütz (1780–1861), German teacher
- Gerhard Anschütz (1867–1948), German teacher of constitutional law
- Hermann Anschütz (1802–1880), German painter and professor
- Joseph Anschutz, American architect
- Ottomar Anschütz (1846–1907), German inventor, photographer and chronophotographer
- Philip Anschutz (born 1939), American entrepreneur
- Sue Anschutz-Rodgers (born 1936), American rancher, conservationist, and philanthropist
- Wendall Anschutz (1938–2010), American television newsman

== Companies ==
- The Anschutz Corporation, an American private holding company
- Anschutz Entertainment Group, a subsidiary of The Anschutz Corporation
- Anschutz Family Foundation, a private foundation based in Denver, Colorado, U.S.
- J. G. Anschütz, a German firearms manufacturer
- Anschütz GmbH, formerly known as Raytheon Anschütz, a German marine navigation company

== Other uses ==
- Anschütz 1827 Fortner, a popular biathlon rifle
- Anschutz Medical Campus, in Aurora, Colorado, U.S.
- Philip F. Anschutz Trophy, awarded to winners of the MLS Cup in Major League Soccer

== See also ==
- Thomas Pollock Anshutz (1851–1912), American painter and teacher
