= KRSL =

KRSL may refer to:

- KRSL (AM), a radio station (990 AM) licensed to Russell, Kansas, United States
- KRSL-FM, a radio station (95.9 FM) licensed to Russell, Kansas, United States
- Russell Municipal Airport in Russell, Kansas (ICAO code KRSL)
