= KZRS =

American radio station, Kansas

- Great Bend, Kansas; United States
- Broadcast area: Great Bend, Kansas; Russell, Kansas; Hays, Kansas
- Frequency: 107.9 MHz
- Branding: Classic Hits 107.9

Programming
- Format: Classic hits
- Affiliations: Premiere Networks; Kansas City Chiefs; Kansas State Wildcats

Ownership
- Owner: Barbara White; (White Communications, L.L.C.)
- Sister stations: KRSL, KRSL-FM

History
- First air date: February 3, 1986 (as KZXL)
- Former call signs: KZXL (1985–1993); KZLS (1993–2008)
- Call sign meaning: Russell

Technical information
- Licensing authority: FCC
- Facility ID: 37129
- Class: C1
- ERP: 99,000 watts
- HAAT: 277 meters (909 ft)
- Transmitter coordinates: type:city 38°47′16.00″N 98°44′17.00″W

Links
- Public license information: Public file; LMS
- Webcast: Listen Live
- Website: KZRS Online

KZRS (107.9 FM) is a radio station licensed to Great Bend, Kansas. The station broadcasts a classic hits format and is owned by White Communications.

== History ==
As late as 2009, the station broadcast a hybrid Hot AC format during the day and Top 40 at night as “Star 107.9” (and was also an affiliate of the syndicated Bob & Sheri), then switched to classic hits as "Old School 107.9."

On September 16, 2020, KZRS flipped to a simulcast of then-sister station KNNS, which aired a conservative news/talk format as "The Patriot." As part of then-owner Rocking M Media's bankruptcy reorganization, in which 12 stations in Kansas would be auctioned off to new owners, it was announced on October 31, 2022 that Russell-based White Communications was the winning bidder for KZRS for $270,000. While the bankruptcy court had approved the purchase, the sale had to be filed with the FCC for approval.

On January 2, 2023, KZRS and KNNS flipped to oldies, branded as "Super Hits 107.9/1510". Upon the consummation of the sale on March 15, White flipped KZRS back to classic hits, branded as "Classic Hits 107.9"; the first song on "Classic Hits" was "Start Me Up" by The Rolling Stones.
