= The Foundation for a Better Life =

American nonprofit organization

The Foundation for a Better Life is a nonprofit 501(c)(3) organization that was founded in 2000 to "promote good values". The foundation creates public service campaigns to share with others its interpretation of values, including honesty, caring, and optimism, in order to create better social paradigms. The foundation communicates its message through television, outdoor advertising, theatre, radio, and the internet; it is best known for the "Pass It On" campaign, in which viewers are encouraged to live by and pass on certain values, with the rationale that examples of individuals living values-based lives may not change the world but collectively they make a difference.

Although criticized for spreading political ideologies, it officially declares itself a non-partisan and non-sectarian organization, funded solely by the Anschutz Family Foundation.

== History ==
Founded in 1999, its president is Gary Dixon. The organization launched its first campaign on November 9, 2001. The original start date was September 13, 2001 but was postponed due to the September 11 attacks. The initial campaign appeared on about 10,000 billboards, signs and posters nationwide. The original message of the campaign was modified to include themes which recognized the state of the nation following the attacks. Specifically, the values of "unity" and "courage" were added with images of flags and firefighters. The campaign was created by copywriter Jay Schulberg and art director Bernie Hogya.

Prior to the launch of the campaign, Dixon contacted Nancy Fletcher, president and chief executive at the Outdoor Advertising Association of America. Reportedly, he was inspired by the association's billboard campaign called God Speaks which generated enormous attention in 1999 and 2000.

The foundation continues to sponsor public service messages in various media. The foundation's "Pass It On" campaign has incorporated the likenesses of Wayne Gretzky, Michelle Kwan, Oprah Winfrey, Nelson Mandela, Michael J. Fox, Albert Einstein, Dolly Parton, and Muhammad Ali.

The foundation's advertising campaign was criticised in Current Affairs magazine for simplifying complex social issues and promoting Anschutz's ideologies: "The Pass It On campaign offers platitudes as a replacement for politics. It acknowledges that the world is full of suffering, but treats that suffering not as the result of how our society is structured, but as a failure of each individual to be kind and charitable or the failure of the disadvantaged to rise up and beat the odds through sheer determination".

== Funding ==
The Foundation neither solicits nor accepts monetary donations from the public. It is not officially affiliated with any religion and instead hopes "the values we share transcend any particular religion or nationality". The chief contributor of the foundation is also the chief contributor of the Random Acts of Kindness Foundation. All funding comes from the Anschutz Family Foundation, an estate foundation funded by brother and sister Philip Anschutz and Sue Anschutz-Rodgers, whose parents established the foundation.
