= Marj Dusay =

American actress (1936–2020)

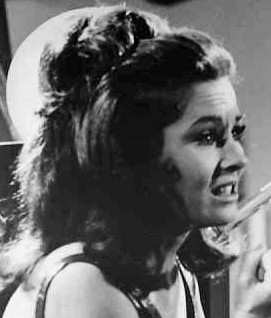
- Dusay in a scene from the TV series Star Trek, 1968
- Born: Marjorie Ellen Mahoney; February 20, 1936; Russell, Kansas, U.S.
- Died: January 28, 2020 (aged 83); New York City, New York, U.S.
- Occupation: Actress
- Years active: 1965–2009
- Known for: Guiding Light; Capitol; MacArthur; Spock's Brain; The Facts of Life
- Spouses: John Murray Dusay (m. 1955; div. 1961) Thomas Perine (m. 1967; died 1987)
- Children: 2

Marjorie Ellen Mahoney Dusay (/mɑːrdʒ duːˈseɪ/; née Mahoney; February 20, 1936 – January 28, 2020) was an American actress known for her roles on American soap operas. She was especially known for her role as Alexandra Spaulding on Guiding Light, a role she played on and off from 1993 through the show's 2009 cancellation, as well as Jean Faircloth, the wife of Douglas MacArthur, in the 1977 movie MacArthur.

== Career ==
In 1967, Kansas native Dusay was a member of the Session, an improvisational comedy group in Los Angeles, formed by Rob Reiner. One member of the Session was Richard Dreyfuss.

Dusay started her career with a small role as a waitress alongside Elvis Presley in the film Clambake in 1967. She appeared on December 21, 1967, in an episode of television's Cimarron Strip. Dusay also appeared in Sweet November (1968).

Dusay's early career focused on appearances in episodic television programs, including Get Smart; The Wild Wild West; Bonanza; The Mod Squad; Love, American Style; The F.B.I.; Mannix; The Bionic Woman; and Quincy, M.E. She appeared on Daniel Boone in its 1969 episode "Benvenuto... Who?" as a beautiful French diamond thief named Eugenie. In 1968, Dusay played a special agent in the TV series Hawaii Five-O, in an episode titled "Twenty-Four Karat Kill". In 1969, Dusay played a woman who agrees to testify against a mobster in "The Singapore File", as well as appearing three times as seductive temptresses on Hogan's Heroes. In 1968-69 she played Gloria in the CBS comedy Blondie.

Notable roles include her performance as alien Kara in “Spock's Brain", the first episode of season three of Star Trek. In it, Dusay delivered arguably one of the most memorable lines of the original Star Trek: "Brain and brain — what is brain?!" She was a popular guest at Star Trek fan conventions, often appearing with personal friend and fellow Star Trek actor Michael Dante.

She starred as Jean MacArthur in the 1977 film MacArthur, and guest-starred as Blair Warner's mother, Monica Warner, on The Facts of Life. Dusay would appear on Facts on a recurring basis over the course of the show's run. In 1982, she appeared as Kate Hanrahan, a madam/con artist, in several episodes of Bret Maverick, in 1982-1983, she portrayed Beverly Tepperman in Square Pegs, and in 1979 she was Jennifer in Stop Susan Williams.

In the summer of 1999, Dusay starred in Andrew Repasky McElhinney's period art-slasher film, A Chronicle of Corpses (released 2001). The film made a "festival splash" and was praised by Dave Kehr of The New York Times as belonging "to the small but significant tradition of outsider art in American movies - films like Herk Harvey's Carnival of Souls or George A. Romero's Night of the Living Dead - that reflect powerful personalities formed outside any academic or professional tradition.” Dusay was praised for her performance as "Grandmother Elliot" in A Chronicle of Corpses which culminates in a tour de force seven-minute monologue for her character. She received uniformly good notices and several acting awards for her work in A Chronicle of Corpses, including winning the prestigious Silver Unicorn for Best Actor ("Unicornio de plata a la mejor Interpretación" — the highest acting honor) at The 3rd Annual Estepona Fantastic Film Festival (held in Spain 23–29 September 2002). A Chronicle of Corpses was named one of the Top Ten Movies of the Year by The New York Times and The Village Voice and its original camera negative is in the permanent collection of MoMA - The Museum of Modern Art (New York). On the occasion of her death, Film International published a fond remembrance of Marj Dusay by A Chronicle of Corpses writer/director McElhinney.

=== Daytime ===
Dusay made her soap debut in April 1983, replacing Carolyn Jones as Myrna Clegg on Capitol, which she played through the final episode in March 1987. Dusay received two Supporting Actress Soap Opera Digest nominations for this part.

She then took over for Shirley Anne Field as Pamela Pepperidge Capwell Conrad on Santa Barbara from 1987–88 and in 1991.

In 1993, Dusay briefly filled in for Louise Sorel as Vivian Alamain on Days of Our Lives while Sorel was on medical leave. After a nationwide search for an actress to take over for the enormously popular Beverlee McKinsey as Alexandra Spaulding on Guiding Light, Dusay was cast in the role and began airing in August 1993, remaining on the show until March 1997. She returned for a brief stint from November 1998 to February 1999.

Dusay originated the role of Vanessa Bennett on All My Children from 1999, a role she played until 2002. As the mother of Dr. David Hayward (Vincent Irizarry, her co-star from Guiding Light) and Leo DuPres (Josh Duhamel), she also became Palmer Cortlandt's last wife, playing opposite James Mitchell. Dusay then once again returned to the role of Alexandra on Guiding Light, this time replacing Joan Collins, who left three months into a six-month contract.

In late May 2005, Dusay was one of several cast members taken off contract due to budget cuts. Dusay continued to make recurring appearances on the show. Dusay played a 2006 storyline where Alexandra married younger man Cyrus Foley (Murray Bartlett) to keep Cyrus in the country - while scheming to keep him out of a younger woman's bed. While Dusay's appearances were greatly reduced after this storyline ended, she did appear in the show's final year, opposite Grant Aleksander, who played her onscreen nephew Philip Spaulding. CBS announced the cancellation of Guiding Light on April 1, 2009, and the final show aired on September 18, 2009. Dusay appeared as Alexandra during the final week of the show. Alexandra attended her brother's funeral and had a "happy ending" of sorts when she reunited with former romantic partner Fletcher Reade.

== Personal life and death ==
In 1955, she married John Dusay, a physician. They had a son, Randy, and a daughter, Debra, who is an actress. The marriage ended in divorce in 1962. In 1967, she married Thomas Perine, who died in 1987. Randy Dusay died in 1993 from AIDS.

Beginning in 1984, Dusay sponsored the Marj Dusay Celebrity Golf Tournament in Russell, Kansas. The event was designated as a fundraiser for the Kansas Child Abuse Prevention Centers and for establishing a statewide hotline.

On January 28, 2020, Dusay died at age 83 in Manhattan, New York.

== Filmography ==
=== Film ===
Year	Title	Role	Notes
1967	Clambake	Waitress	
1967	1999 A.D.	Karen (as Marge Dusay)	Short
1968	Sweet November	Carol	
1969	Pendulum	Liz Tennant	
1973	Thirty Dangerous Seconds	Patricia Randolph	
1973	Breezy	Betty Tobin	
1977	MacArthur	Jean MacArthur	
1986	Drug Free Kids: A Parent's Guide	Mom	Video
1987	Made in Heaven	Mrs. Packert	
1995	Shao nu Xiao Yu	Rita	
1997	Love Walked In	Mrs. Moore	
1998	12 Bucks	Oldie	
2000	A Chronicle of Corpses	Grandmother Elliot	
2002	Pride & Loyalty	Aunt Jeanne	

=== Television ===
Year	Title	Role	Notes
1967	Occasional Wife	Susan	Season 1 Episode 24: "Instant Fatherhood"
1967	Get Smart	KAOS Girl	Season 2 Episode 29: "A Man Called Smart: Part 2"
1967	The Second Hundred Years	Paula	Season 1 Episode 11: "No Experience Necessary"
1967	Cimarron Strip	Zena	Season 1 Episode 14: "The Deputy"
1967–1968	The Wild Wild West	Crystal Fair / Dolores Hammond	2 episodes
1968	Star Trek	Kara	Episode: "Spock's Brain"
1968	Blondie	Gloria Beal	Season 1 Episode 1: "Sayanora Dagwood"
1968–1969	Bonanza	Stephanie Regan / April Horn	2 episodes
1968–1969	Hawaii Five-O	Andrea Claire Dupre / Nicole Wylie	2 episodes
1968–1970	Hogan's Heroes	Heidi Eberhardt / Baroness von Krimm / Countess Marlene	3 episodes
1969	The Felony Squad		2 episodes
1969	The Queen and I	Stella	Season 1 Episode 5: "Who's Holding the Bag?"
1969	Dead of Night: A Darkness at Blaisedon	Angela Martin	TV Movie
1969	Daniel Boone	Eugenie Journet	Season 6 Episode 3: "Benvenuto... Who?"
1969–1970	The Mod Squad	Doris Sanders / Margaret Markham	2 episodes
1970	Medical Center	Dr. Paula Michaels	2 episodes
1970	McCloud	Ellen Childs	Season 1 Episode 1: "Who Says You Can't Make Friends in New York City?"
1970	The Most Deadly Game	Henley Gilliat	Season 1 Episode 1: "Little David"
1970	Family Affair	Dana Markham	Season 5 Episode 12: "The Unsinkable Mr. French"
1970	The Bold Ones: The Lawyers	Florence Mallory	Season 2 Episode 5: "The Loneliness Racket"
1970–1973	The F.B.I.	Harriet Ziegler / Marilyn Wade / Linda Desmond / Peg Higgins	4 episodes
1971	The Immortal	Allison Richards	Season 1 Episode 15: "My Brother's Keeper"
1971	The Odd Couple	Madelyn	Season 1 Episode 23: "What Does a Naked Lady Say to You?"
1971	Alias Smith and Jones	Christine McNeice	Season 1 Episode 14: "Never Trust an Honest Man"
1971	Love, American Style	Debbie (segment: "Love and the Penal Code")	Season 3 Episode 1: "Love and Formula 26B/Love and the Loud Mouth/Love and the Penal Code"
1971	Getting Together	Mrs. Canoff	Season 1 Episode 3: "All Shook Up"
1971–1974	Mannix	Diana Stevens / Helen Layton	2 episodes
1972	McMillan & Wife	Eloise Simms	Season 1 Episode 5: "The Face of Murder"
1972	Climb an Angry Mountain	May Franklin	TV Movie
1972–1973	Cannon	Zunie Mitchell / Mrs. Farrell	2 episodes
1973	Chase		Season 1 Episode 9: "The Dice Rolled Dead"
1973–1978	Barnaby Jones	Gail Anthony / Sylvia Blake / Jennifer Allen (Rhodes)	4 episodes
1974	Bobby Parker and Company	His Wife	TV Movie
1974	The Manhunter	Lorna Travis	Season 1 Episode 7: "The Doomsday Gang"
1975	The Streets of San Francisco	Cheryl Fitz	Season 4 Episode 7: "Murder by Proxy"
1975	Petrocelli	Eve Orland (as Marj Dusay Perine)	Season 2 Episode 9: "Terror by the Book"
1976	Phyllis	Lana Hudson	Season 1 Episode 18: "Phyllis in Love"
1976	Most Wanted	Jean Evers	Season 1 Episode 0: "Pilot"
1976	The Bionic Woman	Dr. Brandes	Season 2 Episode 2: "In This Corner, Jaime Sommers"
1977	The Fantastic Journey	Rachel	Season 1 Episode 3: "Beyond the Mountain"
1977	The Hardy Boys/Nancy Drew Mysteries	Dr. Janice Craddock	Season 1 Episode 5: "The Disappearing Floor"
1977	A.E.S. Hudson Street	Mercy	Season 1 Episode 0: "Pilot"
1977	Murder in Peyton Place	Ellen Considine	TV Movie
1978	Sorority '62	Miss Fletcher	TV Movie
1978	Wheels	Caroline Horton	Miniseries; Season 1 Episode 1: "Episode #1.1"
1978	A Fire in the Sky	Ellen Gilliam	TV Movie
1978	Quincy M.E.	Ginny Drake	Season 4 Episode 8: "No Way to Treat a Body"
1978	Grandpa Goes to Washington		Season 1 Episode 9: "The Red Hot Gift"
1979	The Child Stealer	Mrs. Benson	TV Movie
1979	The Paradise Connection	Maggie Donovan	TV Movie
1979	Detective School	Julia	Season 2 Episode 6: "One Word Is Worth a Thousand Pictures"
1979	The Girl Who Saved the World	Jennifer Selden	TV Movie
1979	Stop Susan Williams	Jennifer Selden	4 episodes
1980	Battles: The Murder That Wouldn't Die	Dean Mary Phillips	TV Movie
1980	Galactica 1980	Mildred	Season 1 Episode 8: "The Night the Cylons Landed: Part II"
1981–1982	Bret Maverick	Kate Hanrahan	4 episodes
1981–1987	The Facts of Life	Monica Warner	Recurring role 8 episodes
1982	Tucker's Witch	Jessica Price	Season 1 Episode 4: "The Curse of the Toltec Death Mask"
1982	The Devlin Connection	Eleanor	Season 1 Episode 7: "Of Nuns and Other Black Birds"
1982	Square Pegs	Beverly Tepperman	Season 1 Episode 9: "Muffy's Bat Mitzvah"
1983	Strange Companions	Mae	TV Movie
1983	At Ease	Lieutenant Colonel Watson	Season 1 Episode 3: "Computer Dating"
1983	Hart to Hart	Cheryl Hyatt	Season 4 Episode 21: "Too Close to Hart"
1983–1987	Capitol	Myrna Clegg	18 episodes
1984	E/R	Mrs. Paffly	Season 1 Episode 9: "All's Well That Ends"
1985	Dallas	Bernice Billings	Season 8 Episode 25: "Sentences"
1987	The Law and Harry McGraw	Judith Harris	Season 1 Episode 4: "The Fallen Arrow"
1987–1991	Santa Barbara	Pamela Capwell Conrad	Series regular 83 episodes
1989	Mancuso, FBI	Maxine	Season 1 Episode 9: "Racial Matters"
1989–1992	Murder, She Wrote	Alice Reynard Carson / Miriam Bowman	2 episodes
1990	Booker	Madame Philippe	Season 1 Episode 16: "Love Life"
1990	Friday the 13th: The Series	Ilsa Van Zandt / Ellie Robinson	Season 3 Episode 18: "Spirit of Television"
1991	Daughters of Privilege	Trina	TV Movie
1991	Sons and Daughters	Daisy Mercer	3 episodes
1991	In the Heat of the Night	Irene Chambers	Season 5 Episode 7: "The More Things Change"
1991	Perfect Strangers	Lenora Dumont	Season 7 Episode 12: "Door to Door"
1992	The Fresh Prince of Bel Air	Sarah Carnegie	Season 2 Episode 16: "Geoffrey Cleans Up"
1992–1993	Days of Our Lives	Vivian Alamain	Temporarily replaced Louise Sorel while she was away); 5 episodes
1993	I Can Make You Love Me	Roberta (uncredited)	TV Movie
1993	The New WKRP in Cincinnati	Clarice Hightower	Season 2 Episode 23: "Father of the Groom"
1993	Love Matters	Aunt Eleanor	TV Movie
1993–1997, 1998–1999, 2002–2009	Guiding Light	Alexandra Spaulding / Radio Show Organist (final apperance)	Series regular 167 episodes
1998–2002	All My Children	Vanessa Bennett	Series regular 61 episodes

== Award nominations ==
Daytime Emmy Awards

- (1995) Daytime Emmy Outstanding Lead Actress in a Drama Series for Guiding Light
- (2002) Special Fan Award America's Favorite Villain for playing Vanessa Cortlandt on All My Children

Soap Opera Digest Awards

- (1986) Soap Opera Digest Award Outstanding Actress in a Supporting Role on a Daytime Serial for Capitol
- (1988) Soap Opera Digest Award Outstanding Actress in a Supporting Role: Daytime for Capitol
- (1995) Soap Opera Digest Award Outstanding Villainess for Guiding Light
