= Spock's Brain =

- Star Trek: The Original Series episode
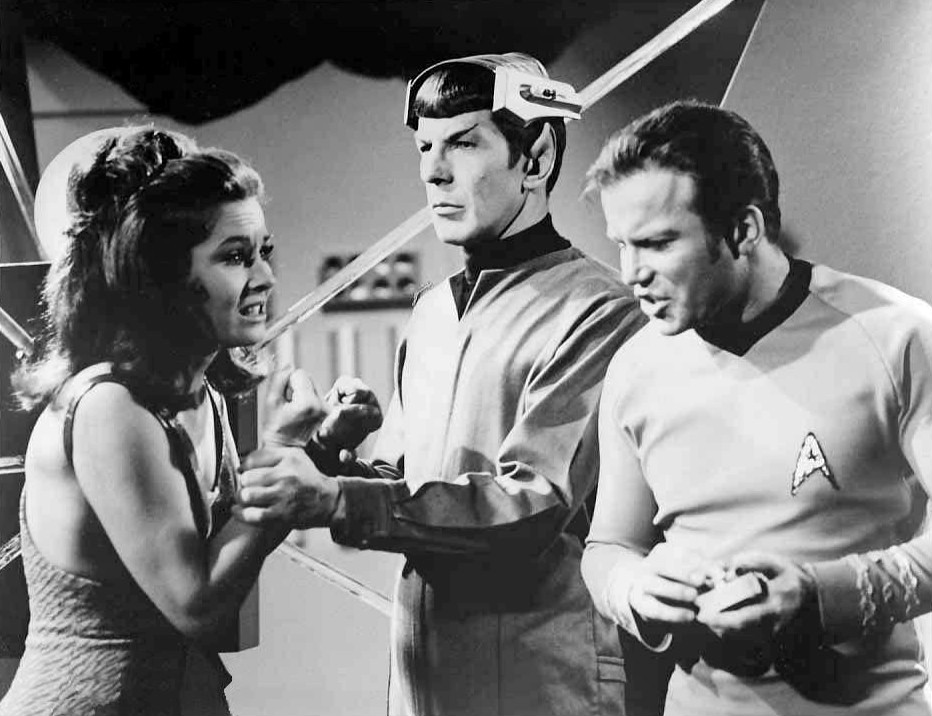
- On Kirk's command, Spock grabs Kara's wrist to deactivate her bracelet.
- Episode no.: Season 3 Episode 1
- Directed by: Marc Daniels
- Written by: Lee Cronin
- Cinematography by: Jerry Finnerman
- Production code: 061
- Original air date: September 20, 1968

Guest appearances
- Marj Dusay – Kara; Sheila Leighton – Luma; James Daris – Morg

Episode chronology
← Previous "Assignment: Earth"	Next → "The Enterprise Incident"
- Star Trek: The Original Series season 3

"Spock's Brain" is the third season premiere episode of the American science fiction television series Star Trek. Written by Gene L. Coon (under the pseudonym Lee Cronin) and directed by Marc Daniels, it was first broadcast on September 20, 1968.

During the episode, an alien woman played by Marj Dusay beams aboard the Enterprise and, after incapacitating the rest of the crew, surgically removes Spock's brain. Captain Kirk and the crew have just hours to locate and restore it before Spock's body dies.

Widely regarded as the worst episode of the series, it was the first to air after NBC moved the show from 8:30 p.m. to 10 p.m. on Friday nights.

== Plot ==
The Federation starship USS Enterprise, under the command of Captain Kirk, encounters an alien ship, from which a mysterious woman beams onto the Enterprise bridge. She stuns the entire crew then examines each of them, taking particular interest in the Vulcan First Officer Spock. When the crew awakens, Chief Medical Officer Dr. McCoy finds Spock in sick bay with his brain surgically removed. Because of his unusual Vulcan physiology, Spock's body can be kept alive in this state, but for no more than twenty-four hours, giving Captain Kirk that much time to recover his stolen brain.

The Enterprise follows the alien ship's ion trail to the sixth planet of the Sigma Draconis system, a harsh world in the middle of an ice age. A band of male inhabitants attack the landing party, and a captured attacker warns Kirk about the "others", also known as "the givers of pain and delight". Kirk asks about the females of his kind, but is met only with bewilderment.

The landing party is joined by Dr. McCoy, accompanied by Spock's mobile body, controlled by a device McCoy has fashioned. The party travels deep underground and encounters a woman named Luma. When questioned, Luma shows the mentality of a child. Spock's voice is heard through a communicator, but before the conversation goes further, Kirk and his party are captured. The party is brought before the leader of the women, Kara, the same woman who appeared on the Enterprise bridge. Kirk demands to know what they have done with Spock's brain, but Kara claims she does not understand what a brain is, exclaiming "Brain and brain! What is brain?" As they try to explain the function of a brain, she realizes that what they are seeking is the "Controller", on which the underground civilization is completely dependent.

The landing party escapes and follows Spock's signals to a control room where his brain has been placed. Kara tells them that the skills needed to remove a brain were provided by a machine called the "Teacher", and that knowledge so obtained lasts no more than three hours. McCoy decides to use the Teacher himself, and then quickly begins the procedure to restore Spock's brain. McCoy's new knowledge begins to fade before the operation is complete, but Spock provides assistance after McCoy reestablishes Spock's ability to speak.

Without their Controller, Kara fears for the women's existence, but Kirk assures her that the men and women can learn to survive together on the surface. Much to McCoy's dismay, Spock recites a protracted history of the culture of Sigma Draconis VI.

== Production ==
Although the episode's story and teleplay were formally attributed under Writers Guild of America West rules to former Star Trek producer Gene L. Coon (who specifically wrote its germinal pitch; initial story outline; and a sequence of first, second and revised second draft teleplays) under his "Lee Cronin" pseudonym (as he was under contract with Universal Studios and contractually unable to write for other studios), incipient showrunner Fred Freiberger contributed a revised story outline in between Coon's first and second drafts that radically altered the gestation of the episode. Thereafter, the final draft teleplay was written by Freiberger-era story editor Arthur H. Singer. Freiberger finally contributed a revised final-draft teleplay and additional page revisions during the production period.

In Coon's April 1968 story outline, Spock's brain is taken by a group of Nefelese antagonists (led by a male named Ehr Von) during a survey of the surface of an asteroid. There is no reference to the Teacher. Upon making contact with Spock's brain, Kirk instructs the brain to go into the slon porra, a Vulcan state of complete mental control. Although McCoy studies advanced Nefelese medical techniques that ultimately enable the restoration of Spock's body (in tandem with his preexisting knowledge of Vulcan and human medicine), this is done without any human–machine interface. Additionally, upon the completion of the surgery, Spock experiences side effects due to the reversal of several nerve endings, forcing him to laugh when he wants to sneeze; these complications (constituting a soupçon of Coon's characteristic levity) are ultimately surmounted through his mental discipline.

== Reception ==
The episode is generally regarded by fans, and those who took part in its production, as the worst episode of the series. William Shatner described it as one of the series' worst episodes, calling the plot a "tribute" to NBC executives who slashed the show's budget and placed it in a bad time slot. Leonard Nimoy wrote: "Frankly, during the entire shooting of that episode, I was embarrassed —a feeling that overcame me many times during the final season of Star Trek."

Zack Handlen, of The A.V. Club, gave the episode a "D" rating, describing the writing as bad and repetitive and the direction as weak. He added that it had its funny moments and some parts had "a lumpy B-movie charm".

In his book What Were They Thinking? The 100 Dumbest Events in Television History, author David Hofstede ranked the episode at No. 71 on the list.

A device similar to that used to remotely operate Spock's brainless body is used in the episode "The Magnificent Ferengi" of Star Trek: Deep Space Nine to animate a cadaver.

The rock band Phish performs a song entitled "Spock's Brain".

In 2012, The A.V. Club ranked this episode as one of top ten "must see" episodes of the original series.

In 2013, Wired magazine ranked this episode one of the top ten most underrated episodes of the original television series, noting that despite it being regarded as the worst episode it occupies a special place in Star Trek lore. However, they also suggested this episode was skippable in their binge-watching guide for the original series in 2015.

In 2016, Syfy included this episode in a group of Star Trek franchise episodes they felt were commonly disliked but "deserved a second chance".

In 2017, this episode was rated the third-worst episode of all episodes of the Star Trek franchise, including the later series but before Star Trek: Discovery, by ScreenRant. In 2018, CBR included this episode in a list of Star Trek episodes that are "so bad they must be seen". A ranking of every episode of the original series by Hollywood placed this episode 78th out of 79 episodes. CBS News listed "Spock's Brain" as one of the worst in the original series. Digital Fox ranked "Spock's Brain" as the number-one worst episode of all Star Trek up to 2018.

In 2017, Den of Geek ranked this episode as the second "best worst" Star Trek episode of the original series.

== Releases ==
The episode was released in Japan on December 21, 1993, as part of the complete season 3 LaserDisc set, Star Trek: Original Series log.3. A trailer for this and the other episodes was also included, and the episode had English and Japanese audio tracks.

== See also ==
- "Machine Made", a 1951 short story written by J. T. McIntosh
- Brain in a vat
