= Story of the Eye =

Book by Georges Bataille

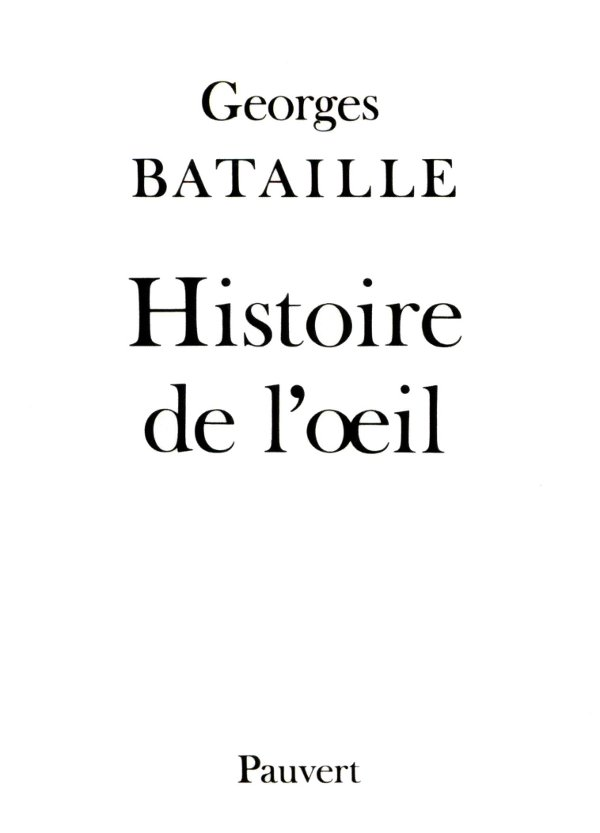
- Cover of the French edition
- Author: Georges Bataille
- Original title: Histoire de l'œil
- Translator: Joachim Neugroschel
- Language: French
- Genre: Erotic fiction
- Published: 1928 (in French); 1978 (Urizen Books NY, in English. Translated by Joachim Neugroschel)
- Publication place: France
- Media type: Print
- Pages: 127 (Penguin Books edition)
- ISBN: 0-14-018009-5

Story of the Eye (French: Histoire de l'œil) is a 1928 novella written by Georges Bataille as Lord Auch (literally, Lord "to the shithouse" — "auch" being short for "aux chiottes", slang for telling somebody off by sending him to the toilet), that details the increasingly bizarre sexual perversions of a pair of teenage lovers, including an early depiction of urolagnia fetishism in Western literature. It is narrated by the young man looking back on his exploits. In 1940 an edition of Histoire de l'œil was illustrated by Hans Bellmer.

== Plot ==
An unnamed boy in late adolescence initiates a strange sexual relationship with his distant cousin Simone when she indulges the narrator's dare to place her bare buttocks in a cat's saucer of milk. Simone and the narrator consummate their erotic desire at a cliff in front of his villa, involving their friend Marcelle in their activities; the pair soon reveal themselves to be exhibitionists, going so far as to have intercourse in full view of Simone's widowed mother. At one point, Simone develops a fetish for inserting soft-boiled eggs in her vagina and anus. The couple engage in a sadomasochistic orgy with other teenagers, which ends with Marcelle having a mental breakdown. The narrator runs away from home and moves in with Simone after stealing his father's money and gun. Marcelle, meanwhile, is admitted to a psychiatric hospital.

Simone and the narrator break Marcelle out of the hospital, but when she recognizes a wardrobe she hid in during the orgy, she hangs herself in a psychotic break. The couple wind up having penetrative sex in front of her body. To escape the legal consequences of Marcelle's suicide, the pair flee and take refuge in Spain. They meet the depraved English aristocrat Sir Edmund, who is happy to accommodate their lifestyle. Edmund tells Simone about the tradition in the aristocracy to eat the testicles of a recently killed bull while watching bull-fighting, and Simone demands the raw testicles of a bull be given to her when they are watching the famous matador El Granero. As Granero is impaled by a bull and his right eye is ripped out of its socket, Simone sticks one of the raw testicles up her vagina and has an orgasm at the same moment El Granero dies.

The three visit a Catholic basilica, where Simone seduces a handsome priest by masturbating while confessing inside of the confessional. Sir Edmund excitedly undertakes a blasphemous parody of the Catholic Eucharist involving desecration of the bread and wine using the priest's urine and semen; Simone strangles the priest to death during his final orgasm. Sir Edmund removes the priest's right eye and Simone inserts it into her vagina while continuing her sexual relationship with the narrator. The trio evade the priest's murder investigation and head for Andalusia, where they buy a yacht to continue their debauchery on African soil.

In a postscript, Bataille reveals that the character of Marcelle may have been partially inspired by his own mother, who suffered from bipolar disorder, while the narrator's father is also modeled after his own unhappy paternal relationship. In an English-language edition, Roland Barthes and Susan Sontag provide critical comment on the events.

== Barthes: metaphors of the eye and liquid ==
Roland Barthes published the original French version of his essay "Metaphor of the Eye" in Bataille's own journal Critique, shortly after Bataille's death in 1962. Barthes' analysis focuses on the centrality of the eye to this series of vignettes, and notices that it is interchangeable with eggs, bulls' testicles and other ovular objects within the narrative. He also traces a second series of liquid metaphors within the text, which flow through tears, cat's milk, egg yolks, frequent urination scenes, blood and semen.

Furthermore, he argues that he does not believe that Story of the Eye is necessarily a pornographic narrative, given that these structuring chains of metaphors do provide coherent underpinning sequences.

== Cultural references ==
- Danish punk rock band Iceage references this book in the song "Ecstasy", and vocalist Elias Bender Rønnenfelt cited Story of the Eye as an influence in writing the album You're Nothing.
- In the movie Weekend, Corrine, the female lead, recounts an orgy she participated in, many of the details of which are derived from the first two chapters of Story of the Eye.
- American indie pop band of Montreal references this book in the song "The Past Is a Grotesque Animal" from the album Hissing Fauna, Are You the Destroyer?.
- In the 1995 Richard Linklater film Before Sunrise, the character Céline is seen reading a copy of Story of the Eye when she first meets Jesse.
- Icelandic experimental pop musician Björk once declared Story of the Eye to be her favorite book. For her 1993 song "Venus as a Boy", a music video directed by Sophie Muller takes inspiration from the plot of Bataille's novella. It features Björk in a kitchen fondling and cooking eggs in a sensual and suggestive manner, alluding to Simone's own sexual fantasies involving eggs.

== Adaptations ==
- The 1974 Italian/Belgian co-produced Eurocult film Simona, which stars Laura Antonelli and Patrick Magee, is an avant-garde adaptation of Story of the Eye that was written and directed by one-time Belgian filmmaker Patrick Longchamps.
- Georges Bataille's Story of the Eye – 2004 experimental film adaptation of the novel.

== Bibliography ==
- Bataille, Georges (1977). Story of the Eye. New York: Urizen Books. ISBN 0-916354-90-3.
- Sontag, Susan (1969). "The Pornographic Imagination". Styles of Radical Will. London: Secker and Warburg. ISBN 0-436-47801-3.
