= Christmas Dreams (film) =

2015 film

- Directed by: Andrew Repasky McElhinney
- Produced by: Michael Rapp
- Starring: Conrad Sager; Francesca Flamminio; Daniel Venini
- Release date: 2015

Christmas Dreams is a 2015 film.

During a hard-luck Christmas season, and in shared dreams, a Little Drummer Boy (Conrad Sager) struggles with his abusive father (Christopher Fleming) and seeks to win the heart of a Pretty Girl (Francesca Flamminio), while her younger brother (Daniel Venini) tries to keep them apart.

== Reception ==
Reviewing Christmas Dreams, Film International said "with irreverent nods to Busby Berkely one minute and to Rocky Horror Picture Show the next, this is a truly strange and wondrous salute to Christmas."

The Museum of Modern Art said that "Christmas Dreams is at once, in Michael Rapp’s music and concept, an homage to the television Christmas specials of the past and, in Andrew Repasky McElhinney’s direction, a sort of psychotronic expansion of them, full of imaginatively bizarre imagery and strange situations. Provocatively, McElhinney neither mocks the material nor fully embraces it, leaving the spectator in an unaccustomed position of rhetorical uncertainty, suspended between irony and sentiment."

== Cast ==
The Christmas Dreams cast features several performers who have appeared in director Andrew Repasky McElhinney's previous works, including Terry Jones, Suzanne Repasky, Melissa Elizabeth Forgione, and James Laster. The cast also features actor/playwright (and frequent McElhinney writing partner), Greg Giovanni.

== Production ==
=== Music ===
Film International remarked that Christmas Dreams "music is buoyantly arranged by Michael Rapp."

=== Writing ===
Producer/composer/arranger Michael Rapp created the Christmas Dreams concept.

At the movie's finale, Christmas Dreams features an original song with music and lyrics by Rapp entitled, "Christmas is for Kids."

=== Choreography ===
McElhinney said he enjoyed working on Christmas Dreams because it gave him a chance to work with new collaborators. 'The choreographer Jenn Rose had been hired before I was' said Andrew, 'and our discussions were essential to shaping Michael and Gene's movie. Jenn and I got along right from the start. We're both Broadway Babies at heart and big fans of Busby Berkeley and Bob Fosse. I think we watched Ken Russell's film of Tommy to get in the mood at our first script conference".

=== Locations ===
Christmas Dreams was shot in a green screen cyclorama on "Stage A" at Philadelphia Sound Stages, 1600 North 5th Street, Philadelphia, July–August, 2012 at 2k on the Arri Alexa Camera in 18 days of principal photography.

=== Visual effects ===
Christmas Dreams features visual effects by Dark Square FX (Michael Clarke, Olivia Clarke, visual effects producers).

== Alternative versions ==
The picture of Christmas Dreams was edited by long-time McElhinney collaborator, Ron Kalish. As of 2020, there have been three versions of Christmas Dreams in release: Versions A, B, and C

Version A of Christmas Dreams features producer/composer/arranger Michael Rapp's soundtrack without any spoken words. The movie begins with the sounds of wind rustling tree leaves before the music starts. A digital master of Christmas Dreams Version A is in the permanent collection of the Museum of Modern Art along with other works of director Andrew Repasky McElhinney. In December 2019, Woodmere Art Museum presented screenings of Version A. McElhinney did not have final cut on Christmas Dreams and did not oversee the sound mix on any version of the movie, but has expressed that, while not a director's cut, his preferred version of the film is Version A.

Version B of Christmas Dreams features a voiceover narration added after the movie was completed. This opening narration was written and directed by producer Rapp and spoken by an uncredited young boy and Francesca Flamminio on the soundtrack during the opening winter tracking shot. This version. of the film was produced as a Blu-ray/DVD combo in 2015 by Christmas Dreams, LLC.

Version C of Christmas Dreams features revised credits and narration added after the movie was completed, written and directed by Rapp, and spoken throughout by Kevin Sorbo. Film International said this version of the movie, Version C, "builds up the film's religious dimension (minimal in McElhinney's edition)". Version C of Christmas Dreams was issued as a DVD and on streaming platforms by TriCoast Entertainment in November 2017. It has subsequently been re-released by TriCoast Entertainment other holiday seasons.
