= Georges Bataille's Story of the Eye =

2004 American film

- Directed by: Andrew Repasky McElhinney
- Release date: 2004
- Country: United States

Georges Bataille's Story of the Eye is a 2004 American drama film based on the 1928 novel Story of the Eye by the French writer Georges Bataille. The film, directed by Andrew Repasky McElhinney, takes place in a seemingly abandoned house where a group of people engage in wordless acts of passion. The film covers a period from evening to morning, and the sexual couplings among the members of the house become increasingly harrowing as daylight arrives.

Georges Bataille's Story of the Eye began as a video installation before being reconfigured into a feature-length film. Variety wrote that the movie affirmed McElhinney's "certifiable coolness." The movie premiered in New York City in September 2004.

== Cast ==
Following the 2016 death of Melissa Elizabeth Forgione, the star of Georges Bataille's Story of the Eye, director Andrew Repasky McElhinney stated, "She was a brave performer who was always willing to take risks. She was also a gifted photographer and a camera operator...I cannot find the words to articulate the meaningfulness of our personal relationship."

== Production ==
Georges Bataille's Story of the Eye was primarily shot at the now demolished Locust Club at 1616 Locust Street in Center City Philadelphia in November and December 2002. Exteriors were shot on condemned blocks of Arlington Street in Camden, New Jersey in May 2003.

== Reviews ==
In his review of the film, Dave Kehr of The New York Times wrote that, "This is transgression in a literal sense, an act of aggression that Bataille would no doubt have appreciated. This is not a movie for passive consumption, but a film that bites back."

In the essay "Realism, Real Sex, and the Experimental Film – Mediating Eroticism in Georges Bataille's Story of the Eye", Beth Johnson wrote that "McElhinney's vision can equally be likened to earlier, non-erotic appropriations of the transgression of reality such as The NeverEnding Story (Die unendliche Geschichte, Wolfgang Petersen, 1984), a film that shows the relay between reality and fantasy through the use of a joystick control, used to access other realms of/in space and time."

Film Threat declared Georges Bataille's Story of the Eye "a new landmark in underground cinema. The film is an artistic assault on both the senses and sensibility. Mixing equal parts of surrealism, eroticism, and silliness into a vibrant package rich with lush cinematography and a challenging soundtrack, it is a brilliant achievement that demands attention and challenges the audience in a way that few films today can dare to achieve."

The San Francisco Bay Guardian wrote "Georges Bataille's Story of the Eye is a provocation that hypnotizes, a hallucinatory narcotic."

Variety called it "a punk-pornocopia equivalent to Last Year at Marienbad".

In "Realism, Real Sex, and the Experimental Film – Mediating Eroticism in Georges Bataille's Story of the Eye", Johnson writes that McElhinney's film is "an account not of the life, but of the myth of Georges Bataille" and that the "extensive use of mirrors throughout the film points to the importance of self-reflexive spectatorship." Johnson goes onto explore how McElhinney purposefully 'misuses' the 'uncanny' and that these "deliberate 'uncanny' misconceptions are a signal that Bataille haunt McElhinney's scene but is not part of it" surmising that "McElhinney's appropriation of Batallie's novella indicates his own avant-garde status as a director who has chosen formally to revise serious sexual literature on screen in a non-titillating way."

Describing Georges Bataille's Story of the Eye, Johnson writes that, "McElhinney dispenses (almost entirely) with conventions that differentiate film from visual and video art. Speech is purposefully sparse, relationships between characters are neither explained nor set against any recognizable moral/familial scheme, and there is little narrative or plot. Interestingly, whereas McElhinney designates his work as film, conventionally the text appears to adhere to definitions of video art" and that the "effect on the spectator can thus be perceived as a violent rocking motion, leaving the viewer with a feeling of disorientation, nausea, and fascination."

Johnson remarks that "McElhinney's vision in Georges Bataille's Story of the Eye is interesting in the way which it combines avant-garde filmmaking and underground, trash, queer, and explicit content. It also allusively sketches in the history of eroticism from the nineteenth century to the present including the boredom that Bataille finds in 'the pleasures of the flesh' that are served up for delectation of decent people."

Johnson connects her observations on McElhinney's Bataille movie back to Bataille himself, writing, "The power of the spectator is further interrogated by the ambiguous reality of witnessing female characters/actors' trauma. After watching women endlessly climb the staircase, we see her finally reaching the top. The woman walks towards a window and witnesses (by the slicing of the original footage) the murder of the former American President John F. Kennedy. As previously mentioned, this scene posits a Bataillean reference in that it demonstrates the visual spectacle of death and links it, in proximity to the erotic image of woman by way of making visible the eroticism of Jackie Kennedy's proximity to (her lover's) death. As Bataille states in Inner Experience: 'There is in understanding a blind spot: which is reminiscent of the structure of the eye. That nature of understanding demands that the blind spot within it be more meaningful than understanding itself'. Thus, as Bataille explicates, the blind spot 'absorbs one's attention: it is no longer the spot which loses itself in knowledge, but knowledge which loses itself in it'.
