= A Chronicle of Corpses =

Film

A Chronicle of Corpses is a 2000 gothic art-house film directed by Andrew Repasky McElhinney.

A Chronicle of Corpses was named one of the Top Ten Movies of the Year by The New York Times and its original camera negative is in the permanent collection of MoMA - The Museum of Modern Art (New York) along with other movies directed by Andrew Repasky McElhinney.

== Plot ==
"An unseen assassin is killing off members of the family one by one, but in a way that defies cinematic expectations. A Chronicle of Corpses imagines the horror movie as seen through a telescope, making full use of artfully composed long takes that reduce victims to insignificant pinpoints on the horizon. Scurrying back and forth across the lawns of a musty 19th century estate, cloaked by an all-pervasive darkness, the aristocratic Elliott family is actually being destroyed by the weight of ever-shifting American history and Gothic tradition."

== Cast ==
The credits of 'A Chronicle of Corpses' bills the actors in alphabetical order: Marj Dusay (Grandmother Elliot), Harry Carnahan Green (Tyrone), Ryan Foley (Sara), Kevin Mitchell Martin (Mr. Elliot), Sally Mercer (Mrs. Elliot), Jerry Perna (Father Jerome), Melissa Rex (The Killer), Lindzie Calabrese Rivera (The Baby), Amanda Scheiner (Anna), David Semonin (Uncle Grady), Georges Spence (Swales), David Scott Taylor (The Beggar-Slave), Margot White (Bridgette), and Oliver Wyman (Thomas).

== Production ==
=== Development ===
Interviewed in The Film Journal about developing A Chronicle of Corpses, McElhinney commented: "I like the horror genre because it is disreputable and anything is permissible. As long as you fulfill certain genre expectations -- or actively don't go in the direction of those expectations -- you have a 'horror film.' A Chronicle of Corpses appears to both 'embrace and reject conventions' because the movie is ultimately interpretive, impressionistic -- an open text. It is not up for the film (or the film's director) to decide how or what the picture is finally, but for the viewer to work with, and become part of, the text and interface with it in his or her own way."

Fangoria remarked A Chronicle of Corpses is "History written in blood" and that "Corpses is a fusion of highbrow and lowbrow aesthetics."

=== Writing ===
McElhinney has stated that the A Chronicle of Corpses screenplay, "was pretty set by the time we went into rehearsal (which I'm not sure was a good thing in the end) but Kevin Mitchell Martin who plays Mr. Elliot was actually so in tune with my style for that film and understood his character so deftly that he improv-ed his monologue ("I feel so hungry to remember . . .") right before the woods tracking shot where his character disappears."

=== Casting ===
Marj Dusay

On the occasion of her death (2020), Film International published a fond remembrance of Marj Dusay (Grandmother Elliot) by McElhinney. The director recalled meeting Dusay: "Marj and I met by chance at the New York-Avignon Film Festival in 1998... I was/am a huge Guiding Light fan and loved her Alexandra Spaulding on the show... Marj had just done Love Walked In and said the independent film was a nice change of pace from soap work. I mentioned specific scenes from various projects, the way she had played them, and how they impressed me. I believe she was flattered. Finally, I asked if Marj would look at a script in about six-month's time for what was going to be my next movie. Marj said to call her when I was ready and I did."

David Semonin

In the memorial, David Semonin Memory Book (2010), McElhinney shared this about his collaborator who appears as Edward in Magdalen (1998) and Uncle Grady in A Chronicle of Corpses (2000). "I met Dave in 1987 when I was nine. I already loved the theater, and had asked my parents to take me to a bookstore that only sold play scripts. We landed at the old Drama Book Store on the second floor of 7th Avenue and 48th Street and their Dave was. I remember asking him for a play – I wanted something avant-garde and provocative -- something along the lines of Frank Wedekind. Not quite giving me what I wanted, David handed me a copy of his favorite play, Thornton Wilder’s The Skin of Our Teeth. We became fast friends and soon no trip to New York ... was complete without a stop-in to see Dave." McElhinney continues, remarking: "As an actor Dave was amazing. I wish we had the chance to work together more. Dave's method was an incredible hodge-podge between total confidence and equally total confusion. Dave feared the spotlight as much as he loved it, and it – and the process -- made him humble. And great. And the pauses! No one this side of John Wayne in a Howard Hawks movie could take a pause like Dave."

=== Locations ===
According the movie's credits, A Chronicle of Corpses was filmed on location in Philadelphia, Pennsylvania in July, August and October 1999. Two historic houses were used for the primary location during principal photography: The Upsala House and The Stenton Mansion. The barn can be seen from Stenton Avenue, just above the intersection of Stenton and East Bells Mill Road. The church scenes were filmed in the Turner Chapel of The First United Methodist Church of Germantown. Additional photography was completed at Asterisk Studies. Exteriors were shot at The Upsala House, in Carpenter's Woods in the Wissahickon Valley Park part of Fairmount Park, and on Burlington Island.

== Reception ==
Variety said A Chronicle of Corpses made a "festival splash" and the movie was praised by Dave Kehr in The New York Times as belonging "to the small but significant tradition of outsider art in American movies - films like Herk Harvey's Carnival of Souls or George A. Romero's Night of the Living Dead - that reflect powerful personalities formed outside any academic or professional tradition."

Carrie Rickey writing in The Philadelphia Inquirer remarked, A Chronicle of Corpses' "narrative resonates and reverberates as only the most universal stories do."

Jeremiah Kipp writing for filmcritic.com said "What's most impressive about McElhinney's highbrow period film is its ability to satisfy snobbish cultural aesthetes while simultaneously fulfilling slasher film conventions."

A Chronicle of Corpses has its International Premier at International Film Festival Rotterdam 2002 (Netherlands, 23 January - 3 February) where it was a VPRO Tiger Awards Competition Nominee.

A Chronicle of Corpses was categorized as the 2002 San Francisco Film Festival's "weirdest film" by Johnny Ray Huston writing in The San Francisco Bay Guardian. He continued, complementing the movie's fusion of "incestuous, murderous historical horror to near-silent, restrained classicism."

The Philadelphia Festival of World Cinema promoted A Chronicle of Corpses as a "challenging but rewarding cinematic experience" and a "highly original achievement."

A Chronicle of Corpses opened October 24, 2001 in New York City. It played midnight screenings in New York City from late November 2001 to February 2002.

Dennis Lim, in The Village Voice, wrote that A Chronicle of Corpses was “Easily the most peculiar American indie to play New York theaters this year... alternately flamboyant and minimal... Abe Holtz's resourceful camera switches between fussy, iconic frescoes and showboat prowls. ...rancid opulence and humid religiosity.”

Film Threat said A Chronicle of Corpses “is an uncommonly well-photographed film, remarkably lush and opulent in its lighting and shadow play."

Time Out said the movie was “Handsomely mounted" with "striking images" and that "22-year-old writer-director McElhinney has an eye is clear.” The New York Post praised the movie for its "stylish, arty look - carefully chosen compositions and shadowy lighting."

Fangoria complemented A Chronicle of Corpses' "particularly nasty infanticide." The New York Daily News remarked that, "McElhinney knows that the scariest things are the ones you can't see, and he wisely spares us most of the gore."

When the movie played Philadelphia, Steven Rea in The Philadelphia Inquirer categorized A Chronicle of Corpses as “a Bresson-meets-Bergman-meets-Wes Craven suspenser.”

Review Aggregator Rotten Tomatoes gives a tomatometer reading of 63%. Carrie Rickey noted the controversial nature of A Chronicle of Corpses writing, “Lit like Vermeer and reminiscent of avant-garde movies such as Jean-Marie Straub’s Chronicle of Anna Magdalena Bach, McElhinney's piece may be too arty for the scare crowd and too scary for the art crowd. But the filmmaker establishes an atmosphere as pungent as formaldehyde.”

Variety's David Rooney wrote that the film showed "more chutzpah and cine-literacy than actual talent" and that "whether the result is artful or artless is a matter of opinion."

Writing about A Chronicle of Corpses in the Cleveland Free Times, Milan Paurich confessed, "After only one viewing of this odd, hermetic fever dream, I'm not sure whether it's a masterpiece or an audacious stunt. But it feels one-of-a-kind, and sometimes that's enough in today's increasingly formulaic indie landscape, where Kevin Smith imitators routinely butt heads with Quentin Tarantino wannabes."

The Plain Dealer said that A Chronicle of Corpses, "exhumes enough movie skeletons to fill a graveyard and a textbook on cinema history. Chronicle is everything from a campy hoot to an art-house mediation to an altogether ooky exploitation flick."

A Chronicle of Corpses was summed up by filmcritic.com as “The art film from hell.”

== Awards and nominations ==
The New York Times - Top Ten Films of the Year list, #9

The Village Voice - Best First Film, #8

International Film Festival Rotterdam 2002 (Netherlands, 23 January - 3 February) Nominee - VPRO Tiger Awards Competition

The 3rd Annual Estepona Fantastic Film Festival (Spain, 23-29 September 2002)

- Winner - Silver Unicorn for Best Actor ("Unicornio de plata a la mejor Interpretación") - Marj Dusay
- Winner - Silver Unicorn for Best Cinematography ("Unicornio de plata a la mejor Fotografía") - Abe Holtz

== 2020 restoration ==
A high-definition restoration of the film was slated to screen at MoMA on March 24, 2020. The original 1999 sound mix was restored and remastered by SoundSpace (Boulder, Colorado) and the negative scanned at 4K by Colorlab (Rockville, Maryland).
