= Alexandra Spaulding =

Soap opera fictional character

- Guiding Light character
- Portrayed by: Beverlee McKinsey (1984–1992); Lydia Bruce (1984); Marj Dusay (1993–1999, 2002–2009); Joan Collins (2002)
- Duration: 1984–1999; 2002–2009
- First appearance: February 10, 1984
- Last appearance: September 18, 2009
- Created by: Pam Long and Richard Culliton
- Introduced by: Gail Kobe (1984); Paul Rauch (2002)
In-universe information
- Other names: Alexandra Von Halkein; Alexandra Thorpe; Alexandra Foley
- Occupation: CEO and president of Spaulding Enterprises; Business Consultant; Chairman of the Board of Directors of Spaulding Enterprises
- Parents: Brandon Spaulding; Penelope Winthrop
- Brothers: Alan Spaulding
- Half-sisters: Victoria Spaulding; Amanda Spaulding
- Husband: Baron Leo Von Halkein; Roger Thorpe (1990–1991); Cyrus Foley (2007)
- Sons: Lujack Luvonaczek; Nick McHenry–Spaulding
- Grandparents: Samuel Spaulding; Victoria Spaulding
- Nephews: Phillip Spaulding (adoptive); Gus Aitoro; Alan-Michael Spaulding
- Nieces: Vicky Spaulding; Peyton Spaulding
- Other relatives: Alexander Spaulding; Lizzie Spaulding (adoptive); Zach Spaulding (adoptive); James Spaulding (adoptive); Emma Spaulding (adoptive); Rafe Rivera; Sarah Randall (adoptive); Herbert Spaulding

Alexandra Spaulding is a fictional character from Guiding Light, an American soap opera on the CBS network.

Beverlee McKinsey originally played the role from February 10, 1984, to August 21, 1992. McKinsey made the character one of the most memorable women on daytime television and although she loved her family, "her voice dripped venom when she addressed her enemies." Lydia Bruce played the role of Alexandra for a couple of days in the fall of 1984 after the death of McKinsey's husband. After an extensive search for a permanent replacement, Marj Dusay, who had played the ruthless matriarch/businesswoman Myrna Clegg on Capitol, was hired and portrayed the character from September 24, 1993, to March 11, 1997, from November 20, 1998, to January 21, 1999, and finally from December 26, 2002, until the final episode on September 18, 2009. She received an Emmy Nomination for the role in 1995. Legendary film and television actress Joan Collins, best known for her role as Alexis Colby on the primetime soap Dynasty, guest starred in the role from September 23, 2002, to December 23, 2002, having originally signed for six months. Collins' portrayal brought a large amount of press and attention to the show as her incarnation of the character was known as "your typical rich bitch." Collins was even reported to have re-written her lines to accommodate the large amount of dialogue she needed to learn and grueling work schedule.

== Background ==
I always loved the storylines where they let her be a little absurd and show her power. I was so in favor of seeing a woman of my age show power, intelligence and also the gift of tongue and cheek and the gift of not being perfect. I love seeing women like that and how they battle to stay strong. I loved it when they put her in the big boy battles and as well as the vulnerability of love and the missing of love and standing by your family. Alex has been great to play. Soaps are fantastic to give you the human side. You roll around in time as the character evolves.

— Marj Dusay, Guiding Light: Finale Interviews

== Storylines ==
After a difficult childhood, throughout which she and her brother, Alan, alternated between feuding and supporting one another against their domineering father, Brandon, the young Alexandra ran away from her family wealth to gallivant across Europe in a series of relationships with poor musicians before marrying a baron, divorcing him and finally arriving in Springfield. She soon became a close ally of Phillip Spaulding and made it her life's duty to destroy her brother Alan Spaulding's plots. This included the 'Dreaming Death' conspiracy, for which she turned him in to the FBI. He vanished soon after and she used her influence to help bring her friends and lovers into the company. She remained a central power figure in Spaulding Enterprises for decades, with a series of successful tenures as the corporations diva CEO. Spaulding experienced a Golden Era during her tenures as CEO during the 1980s and 1990s.

Over the years, she's searched out many of the relatives she believed she lost, including a sister, Victoria, with whom she offered to share the family fortune. More important was her reunion with wayward son Lujack, who she eventually won over despite his misgivings. She supported him in his endeavors, although sadly he would die in an explosion. Her life got more complicated when her supposedly dead brother reappeared looking for revenge of his own. She fled to San Rios where she was kidnapped by rebels before being rescued and returned to Springfield. Her complicated love/hate relationship with Alan would endure for the rest of his life, with them alternately defending and confiding in one another and battling one another for control of the family company.

She began a romance with H.B. Lewis before a plane crash left her on a desert island, with Fletcher Reade and a mysterious man who turned out to be Roger Thorpe. Surprisingly, she married Roger soon after returning, but the marriage was doomed and she publicly humiliated him before subjecting him to blackmail. More surprisingly, she discovered Lujack's twin, Nick McHenry, and pulled him into the family, but alienated him with her continuing meddling in his life and in his marriage to Mindy Lewis, Roger's former mistress. Over time, they came to trust one another as she tried to help him with a career. She eventually came around to accept his relationship with Mindy and encouraged him to fight for her. But Mindy was tired of the intrigue and divorced him before leaving town. When Alan returned in 1994 after being released from prison, Alexandra fought with him over control, but they eventually came to an understanding. When she discovered that Roger had manipulated her into giving Alan back his assets, she pretended to seduce him so Holly would break up with him. Her plan backfired when Holly ended up in Fletcher's arms and ended up marrying him. Alexandra attended the wedding and was amused when Roger showed up and created a scene. When Nick fell in love with Susan Bates, who was HIV positive, Alexandra was supportive of the relationship. Alexandra's days in Springfield came to a brief end in early 1997 after it was revealed that she knew the secret that Alan's supposed daughter, Amanda Wexler, was really their sister, having been fathered by Brandon. Alexandra came back for Philip and Harley's wedding in 1998 but didn't stay for long. Tired of endless corporate intrigue, she left for Europe with Nick and his wife Susan after discovering that Alan was hiding the nefarious Annie Dutton in the Spaulding attic.

She would return several years later, after Alan had a heart attack and the company was in turmoil. She pushed him out and tried to keep the bottle on Gus' parentage as long as possible. When it came out, desperate to hold onto the power she had left, she drugged Alan and tried to drive him mad. He went one better and managed to trick her into a confession of her crimes, not least of which was the stalking and covert harassment of Reva Shayne. He pushed her out of company leadership and into pharmaceuticals. There, she got involved with illegal trading and the sinister Antimonius drug ring. Alan, to her surprise, tried to save her from prosecution, but when Frank Cooper would not relent, she tried to frame him. This backfired, destroying her relationship with Frank's father Buzz Cooper and she ended up in jail only to be freed by her brother just as Phillip was 'murdered'. The siblings continued their fighting, if in a somewhat more low-key fashion, while she blackmailed him for his role in Phillip's death. Her testimony eventually freed Harley Cooper and almost jailed Alan. Subsequently, she played a more minor role, mostly as a help to Alan-Michael and a much needed balance to her brother. She had one final major storyline when Alexandra suddenly married her much younger chauffeur as an effort of keeping him in the country and committed several crimes in order to keep him out of the arms of the much younger Marina Cooper. During the last year of the show, Alexandra became a sounding board of advice to her back-from-the-dead nephew, Philip, his daughter Lizzie and various friends and family members who forgave her for her past schemes.

In the Guiding Light finale, Alexandra mourned the sudden death of her brother Alan and left Springfield to travel around Europe with Fletcher Reade, promising to return for an upcoming family wedding.

== Reception ==
Charlie Mason from Soaps She Knows placed the 2002 recast of Alexandra on his list of the worst soap opera recasts of all time, commenting "As stunt-casting ideas go, it wasn't half bad: In 2002, the CBS soap hired Dynasty's Alexis, Joan Collins, to play its Alexis, Alexandra. Trouble was, the rigors of daytime were far greater than the rigors of primetime — and fans weren't pleased to see previous Alex Marj Dusay kicked to the curb, either — so halfway through her six-month contract, Collins quit, only to be replaced by the actress she'd replaced."
