= KRSL (AM) =

- Russell, Kansas; United States
- Broadcast area: West Kansas
- Frequency: 990 kHz

Programming
- Format: Classic country
- Affiliations: AP News; Kansas City Royals

Ownership
- Owner: White Communications, L.L.C.
- Sister stations: KRSL-FM, KZRS

History
- First air date: 1956
- Call sign meaning: Russell

Technical information
- Licensing authority: FCC
- Facility ID: 71548
- Class: D
- Power: 250 watts (day); 30 watts (night)
- Transmitter coordinates: 38°54′22″N 98°51′39″W
- Translator: 98.1 K251BM (Russell)

Links
- Public license information: Public file; LMS
- Webcast: Listen live
- Website: www.krsl.com

KRSL (990 AM) is a commercial radio station licensed to Russell, Kansas, United States, and serves the west Kansas area. The station is currently owned by White Communications, L.L.C.

KRSL carries Kansas City Royals baseball (except weekday games), Kansas State Wildcats football and basketball and Russell High School football, basketball and baseball. The AM signal for KRSL can be received in the daytime as far west as Colby, as far east as Junction City and as far south as Hesston.

Former logo
