= KRSL-FM =

- Russell, Kansas; United States
- Frequency: 95.9 MHz
- Branding: 95.9 KRSL

Programming
- Format: Adult hits
- Affiliations: Kansas Jayhawks

Ownership
- Owner: White Communications, L.L.C.
- Sister stations: KRSL, KZRS

History
- First air date: September 21, 1978
- Former call signs: KRSL-FM (1978–1984); KCAY (1984–2008)
- Call sign meaning: Russell

Technical information
- Licensing authority: FCC
- Facility ID: 71553
- Class: A
- ERP: 1,350 watts
- HAAT: 148 meters (486 ft)
- Transmitter coordinates: 38°54′22″N 98°51′39″W

Links
- Public license information: Public file; LMS
- Webcast: Listen live
- Website: krsl.com

KRSL-FM (95.9 FM) is a commercial radio station licensed to Russell, Kansas, United States. The station is currently owned by White Communications, L.L.C., and carries an adult hits format.

== History ==
The station was assigned the call letters KRSL-FM on September 21, 1978. On February 8, 1984, the station changed its call sign to KCAY and on March 10, 2008, back to the current KRSL-FM.

On September 23, 2015, KRSL-FM changed their format from classic hits to variety hits, branded as "95.9 Jack FM".

== Previous logo ==
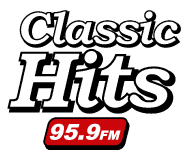
