= Helmut Anschütz =

German fencer

Personal information
- Born: 13 July 1932 Dresden, Germany
- Died: 8 October 2016 (aged 84)

Sport
- Sport: Fencing

Helmut Anschütz (13 July 1932 – 8 October 2016) was a German fencer. He represented the United Team of Germany at the 1960 Summer Olympics in the team épée event.
