= Andrew Repasky McElhinney =

American film producer

Andrew Repasky McElhinney (born 1978) is an American film and theater director, writer and producer born in Philadelphia. McElhinney's cinema work is in the permanent collection of MoMA-The Museum of Modern Art, New York.

== Early life and education ==
McElhinney holds degrees from The New School for Social Research (NYC) and The European Graduate School (EGS) in Switzerland.

In 2011, McElhinney defended his PhD dissertation, which was subsequently published by McFarland and Company as Second Takes: Remaking Film, Remaking America.

McElhinney teaches screenwriting, screen studies, and American Studies, and is an instructor at Rutgers-The State University of New Jersey.

== Career ==
In 1994, while in high school, McElhinney formed "ARM/Cinema 25", a company devoted to producing movies. That same year, he released the short films, The Scream and Her Father's Expectancy.

In 1995, McElhinney made A Maggot Tango. The original camera negative is in the permanent collection of MoMA-The Museum of Modern Art, New York, object number W23983.

=== Feature films ===
McElhinney's first feature film, Magdalen (1998), is about "a world-weary young woman who earns her living in a bar, telling stories to lonely people for money." The Philadelphia Weekly wrote, "Smith's presence on-screen is fascinating, unromantic and tough. The film itself unravels languidly, with stylish, moody black-and-white photography from local cinematographer Abe Holtz." The original camera negative is in the permanent collection of The Museum of Modern Art.

McElhinney's second feature debuted in 2000, the period art-slasher film, A Chronicle of Corpses. A Chronicle of Corpses made a "festival splash" and was praised by Dave Kehr of The New York Times. Dennis Lim, in The Village Voice, wrote that A Chronicle of Corpses was "easily the most peculiar American indie to play New York theaters this year… alternately flamboyant and minimal… Abe Holtz's resourceful camera switches between fussy, iconic frescoes and showboat prowls. ...rancid opulence and humid religiosity."

McElhinney's next film was Georges Bataille's Story of the Eye released in 2003. Dennis Harvey, in Variety, opined that the film affirmed McElhinney's "certifiable coolness" and was "a punk-pornocopia equivalent to Last Year at Marienbad."

McElhinney's Animal Husbandry (2008) is a "pop art fusion of 1930s pre-code romantic comedy and European regietheater."

In 2009, McElhinney created the video projections for Brat Production's Haunted House, Haunted Poe, directing two short films for the event, The Tell-Tale Heart and Poe's Last Train Ride. The Philadelphia Inquirer praised McElhinney's work as "Hitchcockian". The entire production was credited as "the season's wildest ride."

McElhinney's Christmas Dreams (2015) is a children's holiday musical fantasy, the movie was a shot entirely on a soundstage and features extensive special effects and CGI. The Museum of Modern Art commented that McElhinney's direction leaves the "spectator in an unaccustomed position of rhetorical uncertainty, suspended between irony and sentiment."

McElhinney's movie Casual Encounters: Philadelphia True Crime Confessions is in post-production. The project is "based on newspaper reports, interviews and trial transcripts, it reframes Philadelphia true crime narratives to make viewers complicit in, and forced to examine the urban issues of poverty, illegal drugs, gentrification, as well as crime as entertainment, and the voice of violence in domestic American society. …[It] is an epic tour though five radically different, yet adjacent, neighborhoods… The experience is a history of the city 1960–2010, with each neighborhood shot in a different physical film format (4K HD, 35MM, 16MM negative/reversal, Super 8MM, iPhone 5, miniDV and VHS)."

=== Retrospectives ===
June 2004, the Yerba Buena Center for the Arts presented a retrospective of McElhinney's movies and installation work (to date), with the film director and some cast alumni in attendance.

October 2013, the Zoetropolis Art House, in collaboration with Franklin & Marshall College, presented a revival of McElhinney's debut feature, Magdalen, projected on film.

In December 2019, Woodmere Art Museum presented screenings of the original version of McElhinney's fifth feature, Christmas Dreams.

March 2020, The Museum of Modern Art scheduled A Chronicle of Corpses for its 20th Anniversary.

December 2022, The Museum of Modern Art streamed Christmas Dreams as its holiday offering.

November 2023, The Philadelphia Mausoleum of Contemporary Art presented a 20th Anniversary screening of Georges Bataille's Story of the Eye.

November 2024, The Philadelphia Mausoleum of Contemporary Art presented a 25th Anniversary screening of A Chronicle of Corpses.

July 2025, The Philadelphia Mausoleum of Contemporary Art presented a 30th Anniversary screening of A Maggot Tango.

=== Theater ===
Since 1993, McElhinney has directed theater productions including The Visitor (McElhinney) – 1993; Oleanna (Mamet) – 1996; The Artificial Jungle (Ludlam) – 1997; The Malady of Death (Duras) – NYC 1999; The Peek-A-Boo Revue Burlesque Show – 2003–2007; Who Milk Dat Was? (Wildau) – 2007; Death and Devil (Wedekind) – 2009; Blue Movie: A Film By Andy Warhol (Warhol) – 2010; Macbeth (Shakespeare) – 2010; The Cowen Bridge Girls (Giovanni/McElhinney) – 2011; Rent (Larson – musical staging only) – 2011; Timon of Athens (Shakespeare) – 2011; Q+C (Cook) – 2012; Titus Andronicus (Shakespeare) – 2013; and Troilus and Cressida (Shakespeare) – 2015.

From 2016-2020, McElhinney was the Producing Artistic Associate at Torn Out Theater which produced and promoted theatrical productions that inspired and challenged audiences to explore the questions of modern sexuality, gender, and the body politic in public spaces.

In 2017, McElhinney and writing partner Greg Giovanni were commissioned by New Yiddish Rep to create a screen adaptation of Sholem Asch's drama, God of Vengeance.

2017-2021, McElhinney was the director of Shakespeare in Harrowgate Park, a theater production entity committed to free, outdoor performances of classic theater, live music and children's theater in Harrowgate Park.
