= Wendall Anschutz =

American television journalist and sport personality

Wendall Anschutz (January 21, 1938 – January 7, 2010) was a television journalist for KCTV in Kansas City, Missouri, from 1966 until he retired in 2001.

Anschutz was born in Russell, Kansas, and he was a first cousin to billionaire Philip Anschutz.

He received a bachelor's degree in speech and drama and later a master's degree, both from the University of Kansas.

After serving 3 1/2 years as an operations officer aboard the USS Hornet (CV-12), he began working as a reporter for KCTV in 1966.

In 1979, he began anchoring KCTV's evening newscast with Anne Peterson, and they were the dominant newscast team until 1994.
