= Philip Anschutz =

American billionaire businessman (born 1939)

- Born: Philip Frederick Anschutz; December 28, 1939 (age 86); Russell, Kansas, U.S.
- Education: University of Kansas (BA)
- Organization: The Anschutz Corporation
- Spouse: Nancy Anschutz
- Children: 3

Philip Frederick Anschutz (/ˈænʃuːts/ AN-shoots; born December 28, 1939) is an American billionaire businessman who owns or controls companies in a variety of industries, including energy, railroads, real estate, sports, newspapers, travel, movies, theaters, arenas and music. In 2004, he purchased the parent company of the Journal Newspapers, which under Anschutz's direction became the American conservative editorial newspaper Washington Examiner. Anschutz is the son of Fred and Marian Pfister Anschutz.

In 1961, he bought out his father's oil drilling company, Circle A Drilling, and earned large returns in Wyoming. He invested in stocks, real estate and railroads. He expanded his investments to sports and entertainment companies, co-founding the American soccer league Major League Soccer as well as multiple soccer teams, including the Los Angeles Galaxy, Chicago Fire, Colorado Rapids, Houston Dynamo, San Jose Earthquakes, and the New York/New Jersey MetroStars. Anschutz is the principal owner of the National Hockey League's Los Angeles Kings and was a minority owner of the National Basketball Association's Los Angeles Lakers until selling his interest in 2021. He also owns stakes in performance venues, including Crypto.com Arena, The O2 Arena, and the Dignity Health Sports Park. Through his ownership of Walden Media, he has invested in films such as The Chronicles of Narnia, Ray, and Joshua. Through AEG Live, he owns the Coachella Valley Music and Arts Festival, Sea Island Resorts and The Broadmoor hotel in Colorado. He is also the namesake of CU Anschutz, the medical campus of the University of Colorado.

As of May 2025, Forbes ranks him the 130th richest person in the world with an estimated net worth of $16.9 billion.

== Early life ==
Anschutz was born December 28, 1939, in Russell, Kansas, the son of Marian (née Pfister; 1910–1986) and Frederick Benjamin Anschutz (1909–1993). His father was an oil tycoon and land speculator who invested in ranches in Colorado, Utah and Wyoming, and eventually went into the oil-drilling business. His grandfather, Carl Anschutz, was an ethnic German who emigrated from Russia and started the Farmers State Bank in Russell. Anschutz grew up in Russell, as did Bob Dole. He also lived in Wichita, and Hays, Kansas. In later years, Anschutz contributed to Dole's political campaigns.

Anschutz graduated from Wichita East High School in 1957. In 1961, he earned a bachelor's degree in business from the University of Kansas, where he was a member of the Sigma Chi fraternity.

== Career ==
=== Land ownership ===
In 1970, Anschutz bought the 250,000-acre (1,000 km^{2}) Baughman Farms, one of the country's largest farming corporations, in Liberal, Kansas, for $10 million. The following year, he acquired 9 million acres (36,000 km^{2}) along the Utah-Wyoming border. This produced his first fortune in the oil business. In the early 1980s, the Anschutz Ranch, with its billion-barrel (160,000,000 m^{3}) oil pocket, became the largest oil field discovery in the United States since Prudhoe Bay in Alaska in 1968. In 1982, Anschutz sold an interest in it to Mobil for $500 million.

For several years, Anschutz was Colorado's sole billionaire. With his acquisition of land in other Western states, he became one of the 100 largest landholders in the United States.

Anschutz then moved into railroads and telecommunications before venturing into the entertainment industry. In 1999, Fortune magazine compared him to the 19th-century tycoon J.P. Morgan, as both men "struck it rich in a fundamentally different way: they operated across an astounding array of industries, mastering and reshaping entire economic landscapes."

=== Rail and petroleum businesses ===
In 1984, Anschutz entered the railroad business by purchasing the Rio Grande Railroad's holding company, Rio Grande Industries. In 1988, the Rio Grande railroad purchased Southern Pacific under his direction. With the merger of the Southern Pacific and Union Pacific Corporation in September 1996, Anschutz became vice-chairman of Union Pacific. Before the merger, he was a director of Southern Pacific from June 1988 to September 1996, and non-executive chairman of Southern Pacific from 1993 to September 1996. He was also a director of Forest Oil Corporation beginning in 1995. In November 1993, he became director and chairman of the board of Qwest, stepping down as a non-executive co-chairman in 2002 but remaining on the board. He has also been a director for Pacific Energy Partners and served on the boards of the American Petroleum Institute in Washington, D.C., and the National Petroleum Council in Washington, D.C.

In May 2001, the Bush administration upheld Anschutz's right to drill an exploratory oil well at Weatherman Draw in south-central Montana, where Native American tribes wanted to preserve sacred rock drawings. Environmental groups, preservationists, and ten Native American tribes appealed the decision without success. In April 2002, the Anschutz Exploration Corporation gave up its plans to drill for oil in the area. They donated its leases for oil and gas rights to the National Trust for Historic Preservation, which has pledged to let the leases expire, and the Bureau of Land Management said it had no plans to permit further leases there and would consider formal withdrawal of the 4,268-acre (17 km^{2}) site from mineral leasing in its 2004 management plan. In recognition of its preservation efforts, The National Trust for Historic Preservation presented its President's Award to the Anschutz Exploration Corporation.

In May 2003, New York Attorney General Eliot Spitzer reached a settlement with Anschutz after filing a civil complaint accusing Anschutz of accepting IPO shares from Salomon Smith Barney in exchange for Qwest's investment banking business. Anschutz denied any wrongdoing but volunteered to donate a total of $4.4 million to settle the case as long as he selected the recipient organizations in advance. Anschutz paid $100,000 to each of 32 New York nonprofit philanthropic groups, as well as $200,000 to each of six law schools. In return, Spitzer dropped his civil suit. The payment was roughly equal to his profit from the practice of IPO "spinning"; thus, he actually suffered no penalty. Spitzer's suit was panned in a Wall Street Journal editorial headlined "The Anschutz Ransom". The U.S. Securities and Exchange Commission and the U.S. Department of Justice extensively investigated Qwest officials and determined there was no justification for taking action against any board member. The Denver Post summarized the implications for Anschutz: "Not only is Qwest founder and board member Philip Anschutz not a defendant in the long-awaited civil case against the regime of former Qwest chief executive Joe Nacchio, he doesn't even merit a mention in the 50-page complaint."

In February 2006, the Denver Rocky Mountain News reported that Anschutz would not run for reelection to the boards of Qwest and Union Pacific and would resign from the board of Regal Entertainment Group so as to focus on his other investments.

On June 24, 2008, it was announced that Anschutz would buy Xanterra Parks and Resorts, which had purchased the Grand Canyon Railway in 2007. In 2011, it was announced that Anschutz had purchased the Oklahoma Publishing Company, and as part of their assets The Broadmoor and the Manitou and Pike's Peak Railway in Colorado Springs and Manitou Springs respectively.

Effective August 1, 2010, Xanterra Parks and Resorts purchased and assumed management of Kingsmill Resort. Xanterra purchased the resort from Busch Properties, Inc. (BPI).

=== QWEST ===
Anschutz was the founder of Qwest Communications, which he developed in the 1990s by leveraging rights-of-way from his railroad holdings to create a major fiber-optic network. He served as chairman of Qwest’s board and hired Joseph Nacchio as CEO in 1997, around the time the company went public. Between 1999 and 2002, Qwest engaged in a multi-faceted accounting fraud scheme under senior management’s direction. The company fraudulently recognized over $3.8 billion in revenue resulting in a fraudulent $100 billion dollar market capitalization, primarily by improperly recording upfront revenue from sales of indefeasible rights of use for network capacity and related swap transactions, as well as other misstatements. These non-recurring one-hit wonder revenues were falsely characterized as recurring data and internet service revenues in public filings and statements to meet aggressive Wall Street growth targets. The scheme also involved backdated contracts, secret side agreements, misleading statements about directory services revenues, and other accounting errors that understated expenses by hundreds of millions of dollars.

Founder and longtime board member Philip Anschutz sold approximately $1.5 billion, with some reports citing up to around $2 billion, in Qwest shares during the period when the fraudulent practices were occurring. Qwest’s stock price peaked at $66 per share in March 2000 before plummeting amid revelations of the accounting issues and the broader telecom downturn.

By mid-2002 the shares had fallen below $2, reaching as low as $1.20, resulting in a market capitalization collapse of approximately $99 billion, one of the largest in corporate history. Qwest was later forced to restate its financial results for 2000 and 2001, slashing previously reported revenues by billions of dollars and posting deeper losses. In 2004, Qwest settled civil fraud charges with the SEC by agreeing to pay a $250 million civil penalty without admitting or denying the allegations.

While CEO Joseph Nacchio and several other executives faced civil and criminal charges, with Nacchio ultimately convicted of insider trading, Anschutz was not charged criminally in connection with the accounting fraud. Anschutz was named as a defendant in certain civil shareholder lawsuits related to the scandal, which were later resolved through settlements. The billions in funds he acquired by selling Qwest stock ultimately funded his sports, real estate, and media empire in Los Angeles.

=== Anschutz Entertainment Group ===
The Anschutz Entertainment Group (AEG) is a sporting and music entertainment presenter and a subsidiary of The Anschutz Corporation. It is the world's largest owner of sports teams, sports events, and sports venues. It is also the owner of entertainment venues and under AEG Live the world's second-largest presenter of live music and entertainment events after Live Nation. Through AEG Live, it owns the Coachella Valley Music and Arts Festival.

On September 18, 2012, Anschutz announced he was putting AEG up for sale, but he decided not to accept any of the bids, and on March 14, 2013, took AEG off the market.

==== Sports ====
In 2012, SportsBusiness Journal named Anschutz the fifth most influential person in sports business in its annual survey of the "50 Most Influential People in Sports Business."

===== Soccer =====
Anschutz is one of only four recipients of the National Soccer Hall of Fame's Medal of Honor for his contributions to growing the sport of soccer in the United States. In 2006 SportsBusiness Journal ranked Anschutz the most influential person in soccer in the U.S. Anschutz was one of the founders of Major League Soccer and owned several teams for periods of time, including the Los Angeles Galaxy, Chicago Fire, Colorado Rapids, Houston Dynamo, San Jose Earthquakes, D.C. United, and the New York/New Jersey MetroStars. He owns a stake in the Dignity Health Sports Park, the stadium for the MLS team LA Galaxy and former MLS team Chivas USA. For some time, while MLS was struggling, Anschutz owned six MLS franchises concurrently and experienced significant financial losses. For this reason, Anschutz has been called the man who saved MLS. MLS Commissioner Don Garber stated in 2006 that "without Phil Anschutz, there's no MLS today".

MLS Teams Owned
Team	Years	MLS Cups	Fate
Colorado Rapids	1996–2003	1 loss (1997)	sold to Kroenke Sports & Entertainment
LA Galaxy	1996–present	6 wins (2002, 2005, *2011, *2012, 2014, 2024), 4 losses (1996, 1999, 2001, 2009)	still owned by Anschutz
Chicago Fire	1998–2007	1 win (1998), 2 losses (2000, *2003)	sold to Andell Holdings
D.C. United	2001–2007	1 win (2004)	sold to D.C. United Holdings
New York/New Jersey MetroStars	2001–2006	none	sold to Red Bull GmbH
San Jose Earthquakes/Houston Dynamo	2002–2015	3 wins (*2003, 2006, 2007), 2 losses (*2011, *2012)	team relocated after 2005 season, eventually sold to Brener International Group
* indicates years when two Anschutz-owned teams met in the MLS Cup

Anschutz was instrumental in several MLS initiatives that have grown the league's revenues and profits. For example, he pushed for the building of soccer-specific stadiums, allowing MLS teams to increase revenue and better control costs. Anschutz also advocated for MLS's creation of Soccer United Marketing, the league's sales and marketing arm. He has since sold his stake in the Chicago, Denver, Houston, New York, San Jose and D.C. MLS teams and now owns only the Los Angeles Galaxy.

===== Other sports =====
Anschutz is the principal owner of the Los Angeles Kings. He was a minority owner of the Los Angeles Lakers before selling his stake in the Lakers to Todd Boehly and Mark Walter in 2021. Through ASM Global (formerly AEG), he owns stakes in venues including Crypto.com Arena and O2 Arena.

=== Other business ventures ===
Anschutz has had several other business ventures, including Forest Oil, Pacific Energy Group, Union Pacific (he is the company's largest shareholder, with a 6% stake), and the Regal Entertainment Group, the second largest movie theater chain in the world, with approximately 7,000 screens. Anschutz owns more than half of the company, and multiple newspapers and media groups.

Anschutz has invested in, for example, the Clarity Media Group, a Denver-based publishing group that includes newspapers such as The Oklahoman, the largest newspaper in Oklahoma; The San Francisco Examiner (purchased in 2004, sold in November 2011); The Washington Examiner, a conservative weekly tabloid that was consolidated from a group of D.C.-area suburban dailies; The Baltimore Examiner, which launched in April 2006 and was shut down in early 2009; the now-closed Examiner.com, a hyper-local web portal where contributors wrote on local topics from news to blog-like stories; the conservative Weekly Standard (purchased in 2009); and The Gazette, Colorado's second-largest newspaper, with a daily circulation of 74,172 (purchased on November 30, 2012). Anschutz has trademarked the name "Examiner" in more than 60 cities.

On December 14, 2018, Anschultz executed the closure of The Weekly Standard after Editor in Chief, Stephen Hayes, was unsuccessful in an attempt to find a buyer. Existing subscribers were given an alternative of a refund or a subscription to the Washington Examiner.

Anschutz invested in both the Oil & Gas Asset Clearinghouse, an auction company designed for the oil & gas business, and NRC Broadcasting, which owns a string of radio stations in Colorado. The Anschutz Investment Company also purchased LightEdge Solutions in February 2008. LightEdge is a business-to-business hosted services provider focused on Wide-Area-Networking, Voice-over-IP, Hosted Microsoft applications (Exchange, OCS, SharePoint), hosted servers/storage collocation cage and rackspace and Business Continuity Services.

It was announced on September 15, 2011, that Anschutz would acquire all assets of the Oklahoma Publishing Company (OPUBCO) from the Gaylord and Dickinson families. Upon closing, Anschutz would operate OPUBCO separately from his other publishing and media assets as an independent company. Closing was expected in October 2011. In March 2012, it was reported that Anschutz was interested in buying the Rangers. He also invested in the Power Company of Wyoming LLC, formed in 2007 (re-incorporated in 2010) for the purpose of building the Chokecherry and Sierra Madre wind power complex in Carbon County, Wyoming, comprising up to 1,000 wind turbines with up to 3,000 megawatts of capacity. It will be sited on 229,077 acres, about half federal, about half privately owned by an affiliate, and a smattering of state lands. According to the Bureau of Land Management, which on July 2, 2012, announced the completion of the project's final Environmental Impact Statement, "Chokecherry and Sierra Madre are two distinct sites approximately five miles apart which are both being analyzed together. When combined, they comprise the largest commercial wind generation facility proposed in the U.S. and one of the largest in the world." Construction of the project is currently ongoing, and the cost is an estimated $5 billion.

== Political and social activism ==
Anschutz has supported the Parents Television Council, a group that protests against television content that they consider indecent. He also financed and distributed films with Christian themes for mass audiences (through his two film production companies and ownership of much of the Regal, Edwards and United Artists theater chains) including Amazing Grace and The Chronicles of Narnia: The Lion, the Witch and the Wardrobe. He financed The Foundation for a Better Life. In 2009, Anschutz purchased the conservative American opinion magazine The Weekly Standard from Rupert Murdoch's News Corporation. In 2010, he financed the pro-charter school film Waiting for Superman.

Through the Anschutz Foundation, he had made grants to conservative think tanks, including the American Enterprise Institute, the Federalist Society, and the Heritage Foundation. Anschutz contributed $1 million to conservatives during the 2016 U.S. elections, and $200,000 to Republican politicians and political action committees during the off-year 2017 elections. The foundation awarded conservative evangelical psychologist and author James Dobson an award for his "contributions to the American Family".

In 2006, a lawyer for Anschutz wrote a letter to President George W. Bush's White House Counsel Harriet Miers recommending Neil Gorsuch to the newly vacant seat on the U.S. Court of Appeals for the Tenth Circuit after The Denver Post reported that Gorsuch was not actively being considered for the vacancy.

In the wake of the 2022 Dobbs v. Jackson Women's Health Organization Supreme Court decision, which overturned Roe v. Wade, the Anschutz Corporation issued the statement that “[a]s a personal matter, Philip F. Anschutz believes in a woman's right to choose and did not support the reversal of Roe."

Anschutz donated $1.3 million to conservatives during the 2026 U.S. elections. Anschutz is tied to the conservative dark money group Advance Colorado which supported the 2026 Colorado ballot measures Amendment 81, Amendment 82, Amendment 83, Amendment 84, Amendment 85, Amendment 86, Proposition 132, and Proposition 136. Employees of the Anchutz owned Broadmoor Hotel, Anschutz Exploration Corporation, and Xanterra Travel Collection received emails containing the Anschutz owned Colorado Springs Gazette editorial boards voter guide supporting these propositions and conservative candidates.

== Philanthropy ==
Anschutz is an active philanthropist. He heads the Anschutz Foundation, and was listed 41st on the Forbes 400 list in October 2019, with a net worth of $11.5 billion.

Anschutz and his wife have contributed over $100 million to the new medical, dental, physical therapy, physician assistant, nursing, and pharmacy campus of the University of Colorado School of Medicine in Aurora, Colorado, now named the Anschutz Medical Campus in their honor. The land came from the recently closed Fitzsimons Army Medical Center, but millions were needed for the construction of new medical laboratory buildings and a new University Hospital on the land. They have also donated to the University of Kansas, their alma mater. There is an Anschutz Library and an Anschutz Sports Pavilion. In recognition of their philanthropic efforts, the Anschutzes received the 2009 William E. Simon Prize for Philanthropic Leadership.

In 2018, Anschutz donated $1 million to Elton John AIDS Foundation.

== Personal life ==
Anschutz is a conservative Christian and a member of the Evangelical Presbyterian Church. He and his wife Nancy, whom he met when he was 16, have three children.

Anschutz prefers to stay out of the limelight. He has granted only three formal interviews since 1979, and none from the 1980s until 2015. On December 6, 2015, he broke his media silence when he appeared with several of the founders of Major League Soccer to reflect on the league's 20th anniversary.

Anschutz has run 15 marathons.

His first cousin was fellow Russell native and longtime news anchor Wendall Anschutz.

== Awards and honors ==
- 1985 – Golden Plate Award of the American Academy of Achievement
- 2000 – Kansas Business Hall of Fame
- 2002 – U.S. Business Hall of Fame
- 2017 – Native Sons and Daughters of Kansas "Kansan of the Year"

Sporting positions
Preceded by Jeffrey Sudikoff; Joseph Cohen	Los Angeles Kings principal owner 1995–present Served alongside: Ed Roski Jr.	Incumbent
