= Sue Anschutz-Rodgers =

American rancher, conservationist, and philanthropist (born 1936)

- Born: Sue Anschutz; 1936 (age 89–90); Russell, Kansas
- Education: B.A., University of Kansas, 1955
- Occupations: Rancher, philanthropist
- Years active: 1987–present
- Children: 3
- Parent(s): Frederick and Marian Anschutz
- Relatives: Philip Anschutz (brother)
- Awards: Colorado Women's Hall of Fame, 2008; Colorado Business Hall of Fame, 2017

Sue Anschutz-Rodgers (born 1936) is an American rancher, conservationist, and philanthropist. Owner of the Crystal River Ranch in Roaring Fork Valley, Colorado, she is a proponent of conservationism and preservation of the heritage of the American West, and helped implement the legal concept of conservation easements in the state. She is the chair and president of the Anschutz Family Foundation, which funds nonprofits, and also heads the Sue Anschutz-Rodgers Fund, which funds projects promoting women's self-sufficiency. She is an active member of many state and national boards. She was inducted into the Colorado Women's Hall of Fame in 2008 and the Colorado Business Hall of Fame in 2017.

== Early life and family ==
Sue Anschutz grew up in Russell, Kansas, the daughter of Frederick and Marian Pfister Anschutz. Farming was part of her family's history, as her great-grandfather, Christian Anschutz, was one of the German farmers brought to Russia by Catherine the Great to increase the yield in the Volga River valley. Anschutz eventually left Russia for America and started a farm in Kansas.

Frederick Anschutz began buying up ranches in the 1950s and tapping them for oil reserves, netting him his fortune. As a girl, Sue accompanied her father on the inspections of his oil fields, and learned to handle horses, brand cattle, and bale hay from the ranch hands. She has one younger brother, Philip, a billionaire philanthropist who heads the Anschutz Foundation.

== Career ==
Like her father and brother, she is a graduate of the University of Kansas, attaining her bachelor's degree in education in 1955. She began working as a teacher, returning each summer to spend time with her family at their ranch.

In 1987, she acquired ownership of the Crystal River Ranch in Roaring Fork Valley, which her father had purchased in 1966. Under her direction, the ranch's holdings grew from one bull and 33 cows to 1,700 head of cattle by 2008. In keeping with her drive for conservationism, she installed a self-propelled water system that does not use electricity or fossil fuels.

Anschutz-Rodgers is a strong proponent of conservationism and the preservation of the heritage of the American West. She spearheaded the effort to implement conservation easements in Colorado, a legal concept that shields ranchland from future real estate development.

== Philanthropy ==
When her father endowed the Anschutz Family Foundation in 1982, she became its executive director, president, and trustee. As of 2023, she continues to serve as chair and president. From the initial endowment of $4.5 million, the foundation's assets increased to $55.5 million as of 2016, and it has awarded more than 9,000 grants worth $52.6 million in the area of human services. In the early 1990s, Anschutz-Rodgers created Colorado Rural Philanthropy Days to encourage other philanthropists to fund nonprofits in the rural sector. She also heads the Sue Anschutz-Rodgers Fund, which funds projects promoting women's self-sufficiency.

In 2003, she and her brother Philip donated $2 million toward a new exhibition gallery at the Denver Museum of Nature and Science. In 2013 she endowed a $2 million chair in retinal diseases at the University of Colorado School of Medicine. In 2018, she made an additional gift to the Department of Ophthalmology and University of Colorado Hospital which led to the designation of the program as the UCHealth Sue Anschutz-Rodgers Eye Center.

== Other memberships ==
Anschutz-Rodgers has been an active member of numerous boards at the state and national levels, including the Aspen Valley Land Trust, the Colorado Cattlemen's Agricultural Land Trust, the Colorado Conservation Trust, the Crow Canyon Archaeological Center, the Denver Police Foundation, the Denver Museum of Nature and Science, the Jane Goodall Institute, the United States office of the Lewa Wildlife Conservancy of Kenya, and the National Fish and Wildlife Organization. She is the first woman to be named to the nine-member executive committee of the National Western Stock Show.

== Awards and honors ==
In 1997, Anschutz-Rodgers was honored as one of the Denver Women of Distinction by the Girl Scouts of Colorado. She was the recipient of the Citizen of the West award of the National Western Stock Show in 2006, becoming the first woman to earn that honor. In 2012, she received the George E. Cranmer Award from Colorado Open Lands for her contributions to land preservation. Also in 2012, the Denver Rescue Mission honored her as one of the four "Women Who've Changed the Heart of the City". In 2013, she received the Russell Thayer Tutt Award from the El Pomar Foundation for "exceptional leadership in the nonprofit sector".

In 2008, she was inducted into the Colorado Women's Hall of Fame. In 2017, she was inducted into the Colorado Business Hall of Fame.

== Personal life ==
Anschutz-Rodgers is divorced and has three daughters.
