= Russell, Kansas =

City in Russell County, Kansas

- City and County seat
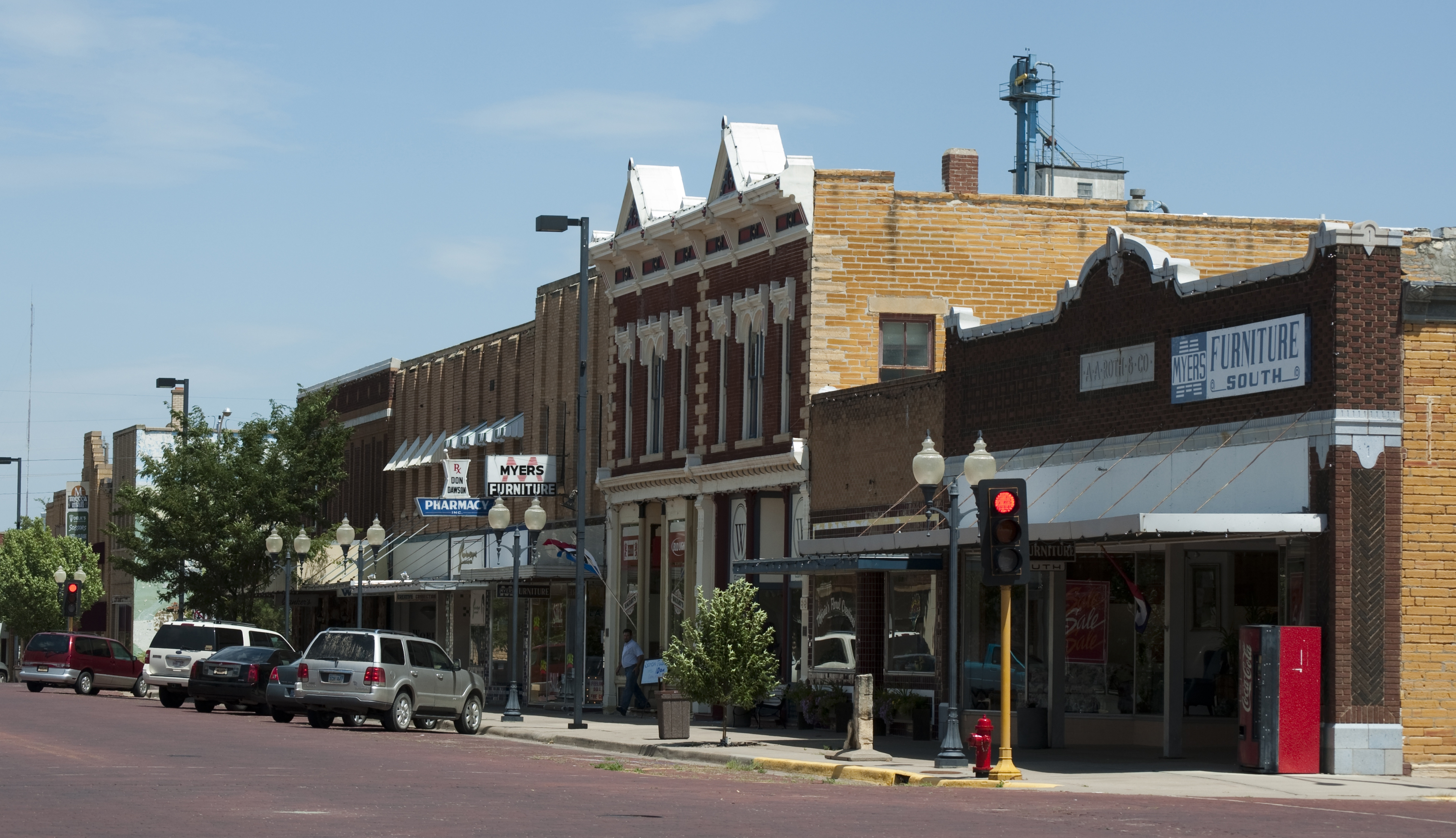
- Main Street in downtown Russell (2009)

- Location within Russell County and Kansas

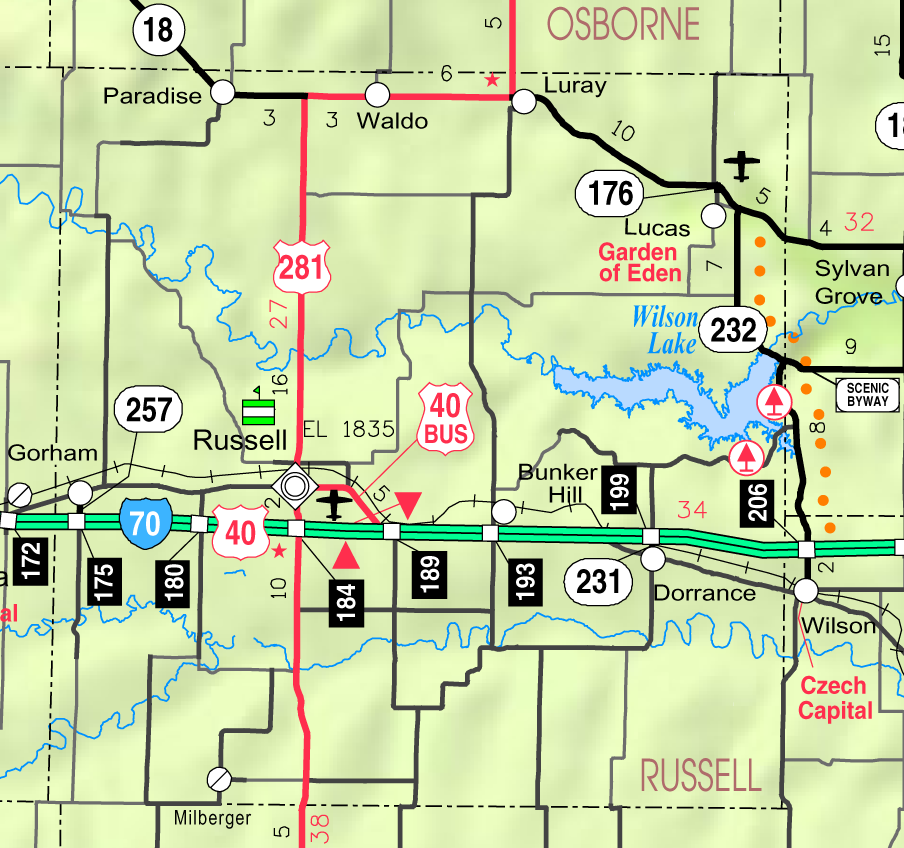
- KDOT map of Russell County (legend)
- Coordinates: 38°53′23″N 98°51′26″W
- Country: United States
- State: Kansas
- County: Russell
- Founded: 1871
- Incorporated: 1872
- Named for: Russell County

Area
  - Total: 4.81 sq mi (12.47 km^{2})
  - Land: 4.81 sq mi (12.47 km^{2})
  - Water: 0 sq mi (0.00 km^{2})
- Elevation: 1,828 ft (557 m)

Population (2020)
  - Total: 4,401
  - Density: 914.1/sq mi (352.9/km^{2})
- Time zone: UTC-6 (CST)
  - Summer (DST): UTC-5 (CDT)
- ZIP Code: 67665
- Area code: 785
- FIPS code: 20-61825
- GNIS ID: 475222
- Website: russellcity.org

Russell is the most populous city in and the county seat of Russell County, Kansas, United States. As of the 2020 census, the population of the city was 4,401.

== History ==
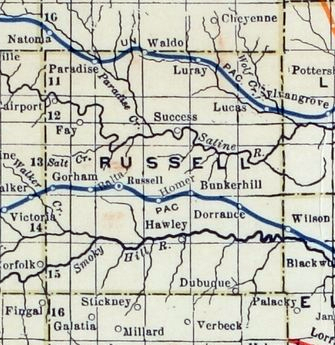
1915 railroad map of Russell County

In 1865, the Butterfield Overland Despatch established a short-lived station named Fossil Creek Station along its route from Atchison, Kansas to Denver near the site of modern Russell. In 1867, the Kansas Pacific Railway reached the area and built its own station, also named Fossil Creek, later just Fossil, north of the Butterfield station. That same year, the Kansas Legislature established the surrounding area as Russell County. In 1871, colonists from Ripon, Wisconsin established a permanent settlement at Fossil Station, renaming it Russell after the county. Russell was incorporated and named the provisional county seat in 1872, and, after a two-year dispute with neighboring Bunker Hill, it became the permanent county seat in 1874. In 1876, Volga Germans, mostly from the area around Saratov and Samara in Russia, began settling in and around Russell.

The first discovery oil well in Russell County was drilled west of Russell in 1923. An oil boom ensued and lasted through the 1930s, attracting settlers from Oklahoma and Texas. Petroleum production became a staple of the local economy.

Russell came to national attention in the mid-1990s as the hometown of U.S. Senators Bob Dole and Arlen Specter when both men campaigned for the U.S. presidency. Dole was born and raised in Russell, and it remained his official place of residence throughout his political career.

== Geography ==
Russell is located in north-central Kansas at the intersection of Interstate 70 and U.S. Route 281, Russell is approximately 113 miles (182 km) northwest of Wichita, 231 miles (372 km) west of Kansas City, and 336 miles (541 km) east-southeast of Denver.

The city lies in the Smoky Hills region of the Great Plains approximately 5 miles (8.0 km) south of the Saline River and 8 miles (13 km) north of the Smoky Hill River. Fossil Creek, a tributary of the Smoky Hill River, passes immediately south of the city where it has been dammed to form a small reservoir, Fossil Lake.

According to the United States Census Bureau, the city has a total area of 4.87 square miles (12.61 km^{2}), all land.

=== Climate ===
Russell has a humid continental climate (Köppen Dfa), with hot, humid summers and cold, dry winters. On average, January is the coldest month, and July is both the hottest month and the wettest month.

The high temperature reaches or exceeds 90 °F (32 °C) an average of 63.2 days a year and reaches or exceeds 100 °F (38 °C) an average of 12.5 days a year. The minimum temperature falls below the freezing point 32 °F (0 °C) an average of 129.7 days a year. The hottest temperature recorded in Russell was 114 °F (45.6 °C) on June 30, 1980, while the coldest temperature recorded was −24 °F (−31.1 °C) on December 22, 1989.

Climate data for Russell, Kansas, 1991–2020 normals, extremes 1949–present
Month	Jan	Feb	Mar	Apr	May	Jun	Jul	Aug	Sep	Oct	Nov	Dec	Year
Record high °F (°C)	84 (29)	88 (31)	96 (36)	101 (38)	103 (39)	114 (46)	111 (44)	112 (44)	108 (42)	99 (37)	89 (32)	79 (26)	114 (46)
Mean maximum °F (°C)	66.3 (19.1)	72.1 (22.3)	80.9 (27.2)	88.0 (31.1)	94.0 (34.4)	101.1 (38.4)	104.3 (40.2)	102.2 (39.0)	98.5 (36.9)	90.0 (32.2)	76.4 (24.7)	65.1 (18.4)	105.7 (40.9)
Mean daily maximum °F (°C)	42.1 (5.6)	46.2 (7.9)	57.2 (14.0)	66.6 (19.2)	76.3 (24.6)	87.7 (30.9)	92.6 (33.7)	89.7 (32.1)	81.9 (27.7)	69.1 (20.6)	55.2 (12.9)	43.3 (6.3)	67.3 (19.6)
Daily mean °F (°C)	30.5 (−0.8)	33.9 (1.1)	44.1 (6.7)	53.4 (11.9)	63.9 (17.7)	75.1 (23.9)	79.9 (26.6)	77.5 (25.3)	69.2 (20.7)	55.9 (13.3)	42.5 (5.8)	32.1 (0.1)	54.8 (12.7)
Mean daily minimum °F (°C)	18.8 (−7.3)	21.6 (−5.8)	31.0 (−0.6)	40.2 (4.6)	51.5 (10.8)	62.4 (16.9)	67.3 (19.6)	65.3 (18.5)	56.6 (13.7)	42.8 (6.0)	29.8 (−1.2)	20.9 (−6.2)	42.4 (5.8)
Mean minimum °F (°C)	0.6 (−17.4)	2.9 (−16.2)	12.4 (−10.9)	22.8 (−5.1)	35.9 (2.2)	49.6 (9.8)	56.5 (13.6)	54.5 (12.5)	39.9 (4.4)	24.7 (−4.1)	12.1 (−11.1)	2.8 (−16.2)	−4.9 (−20.5)
Record low °F (°C)	−20 (−29)	−20 (−29)	−16 (−27)	11 (−12)	25 (−4)	37 (3)	45 (7)	45 (7)	28 (−2)	11 (−12)	−5 (−21)	−24 (−31)	−24 (−31)
Average precipitation inches (mm)	0.55 (14)	0.71 (18)	1.30 (33)	2.17 (55)	3.98 (101)	3.31 (84)	3.97 (101)	3.28 (83)	2.15 (55)	1.72 (44)	0.96 (24)	0.74 (19)	24.84 (631)
Average snowfall inches (cm)	5.7 (14)	3.7 (9.4)	3.9 (9.9)	0.6 (1.5)	0.0 (0.0)	0.0 (0.0)	0.0 (0.0)	0.0 (0.0)	0.0 (0.0)	0.3 (0.76)	1.9 (4.8)	4.1 (10)	20.2 (50.36)
Average precipitation days (≥ 0.01 in)	4.1	4.2	6.4	8.4	10.9	9.3	9.7	8.4	6.6	6.3	4.3	4.1	82.7
Average snowy days (≥ 0.1 in)	3.4	2.4	1.9	0.5	0.0	0.0	0.0	0.0	0.0	0.1	1.3	2.5	12.1
Source 1: NOAA (snow/snow days 1981–2010)
Source 2: National Weather Service

== Demographics ==
Historical population
Census	Pop.	Note	%±
1880	861		—
1890	961		11.6%
1900	1,143		18.9%
1910	1,692		48.0%
1920	1,700		0.5%
1930	2,352		38.4%
1940	4,819		104.9%
1950	6,483		34.5%
1960	6,113		−5.7%
1970	5,371		−12.1%
1980	5,427		1.0%
1990	4,781		−11.9%
2000	4,696		−1.8%
2010	4,506		−4.0%
2020	4,401		−2.3%
U.S. Decennial Census

=== 2020 census ===
As of the 2020 census, Russell had a population of 4,401. The median age was 42.9 years. 23.3% of residents were under the age of 18 and 21.8% of residents were 65 years of age or older. For every 100 females there were 94.1 males, and for every 100 females age 18 and over there were 91.7 males age 18 and over.

92.4% of residents lived in urban areas, while 7.6% lived in rural areas.

There were 1,930 households in Russell, of which 26.6% had children under the age of 18 living in them. Of all households, 42.3% were married-couple households, 21.5% were households with a male householder and no spouse or partner present, and 29.3% were households with a female householder and no spouse or partner present. About 37.9% of all households were made up of individuals and 19.0% had someone living alone who was 65 years of age or older.

There were 2,301 housing units, of which 16.1% were vacant. The homeowner vacancy rate was 4.7% and the rental vacancy rate was 16.8%.

Racial composition as of the 2020 census
Race	Number	Percent
White	3,977	90.4%
Black or African American	52	1.2%
American Indian and Alaska Native	30	0.7%
Asian	19	0.4%
Native Hawaiian and Other Pacific Islander	0	0.0%
Some other race	46	1.0%
Two or more races	277	6.3%
Hispanic or Latino (of any race)	183	4.2%

=== 2010 census ===
As of the 2010 census, there were 4,506 people, 2,041 households, and 1,216 families residing in the city. The population density was 919.6 inhabitants per square mile (355.1/km^{2}). There were 2,393 housing units at an average density of 488.4 per square mile (188.6/km^{2}). The racial makeup of the city was 95.6% White, 1.0% African American, 0.6% American Indian, 0.5% Asian, 0.6% from some other race, and 1.6% from two or more races. Hispanics and Latinos of any race were 2.1% of the population.

There were 2,041 households, of which 26.2% had children under the age of 18 living with them, 45.6% were married couples living together, 4.7% had a male householder with no wife present, 9.3% had a female householder with no husband present, and 40.4% were non-families. 36.4% of all households were made up of individuals, and 17.1% had someone living alone who was 65 years of age or older. The average household size was 2.16, and the average family size was 2.79.

The median age in the city was 44.6 years. 22.2% of residents were under the age of 18; 7% were between the ages of 18 and 24; 21.2% were from 25 to 44; 27.3% were from 45 to 64; and 22.3% were 65 years of age or older. The gender makeup of the city was 49.0% male and 51.0% female.

The median income for a household in the city was $32,347, and the median income for a family was $43,834. Males had a median income of $31,727 versus $19,583 for females. The per capita income for the city was $21,330. About 17.2% of families and 21.6% of the population were below the poverty line, including 38.7% of those under age 18 and 14.1% of those age 65 or over.

== Economy ==
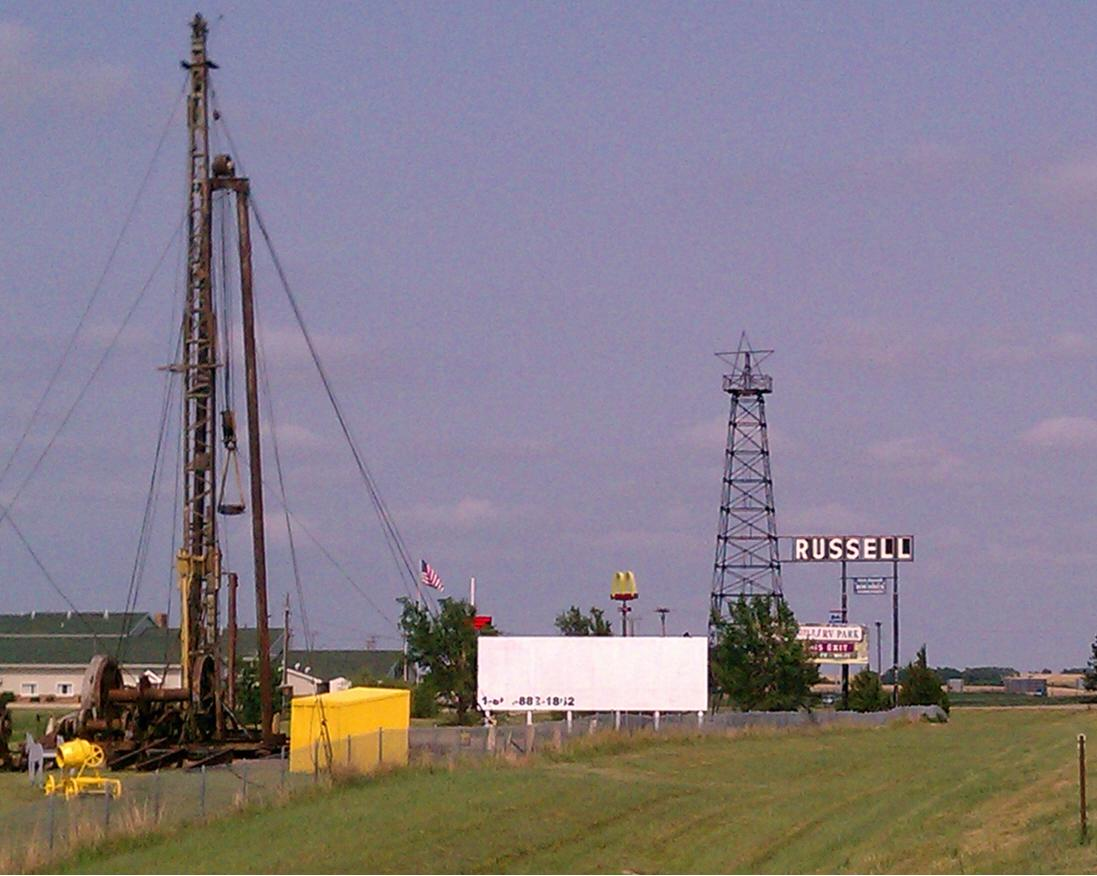
Petroleum drilling is a major component of the local economy.

The economy of Russell is based primarily on agriculture with wheat gluten and ethanol manufacturing facilities located in the local industrial park. Russell County is also one of the leading petroleum producing counties in Kansas.

As of 2012, 65.2% of the population over the age of 16 was in the labor force. 0.4% was in the armed forces, and 64.8% was in the civilian labor force with 61.6% being employed and 3.3% unemployed. The composition, by occupation, of the employed civilian labor force was: 33.9% in sales and office occupations; 24.4% in management, business, science, and arts; 17.5% in service occupations; 12.3% in natural resources, construction, and maintenance; and 11.9% in production, transportation, and material moving. The three industries employing the largest percentages of the working civilian labor force were: educational services, health care, and social assistance (28.3%); retail trade (20.0%); and agriculture, forestry, fishing and hunting, and mining (12.8%).

The cost of living in Russell is relatively low; compared to a U.S. average of 100, the cost of living index for the city is 77.2. As of 2012, the median home value in the city was $63,200, the median selected monthly owner cost was $935 for housing units with a mortgage and $412 for those without, and the median gross rent was $657.

== Arts and culture ==
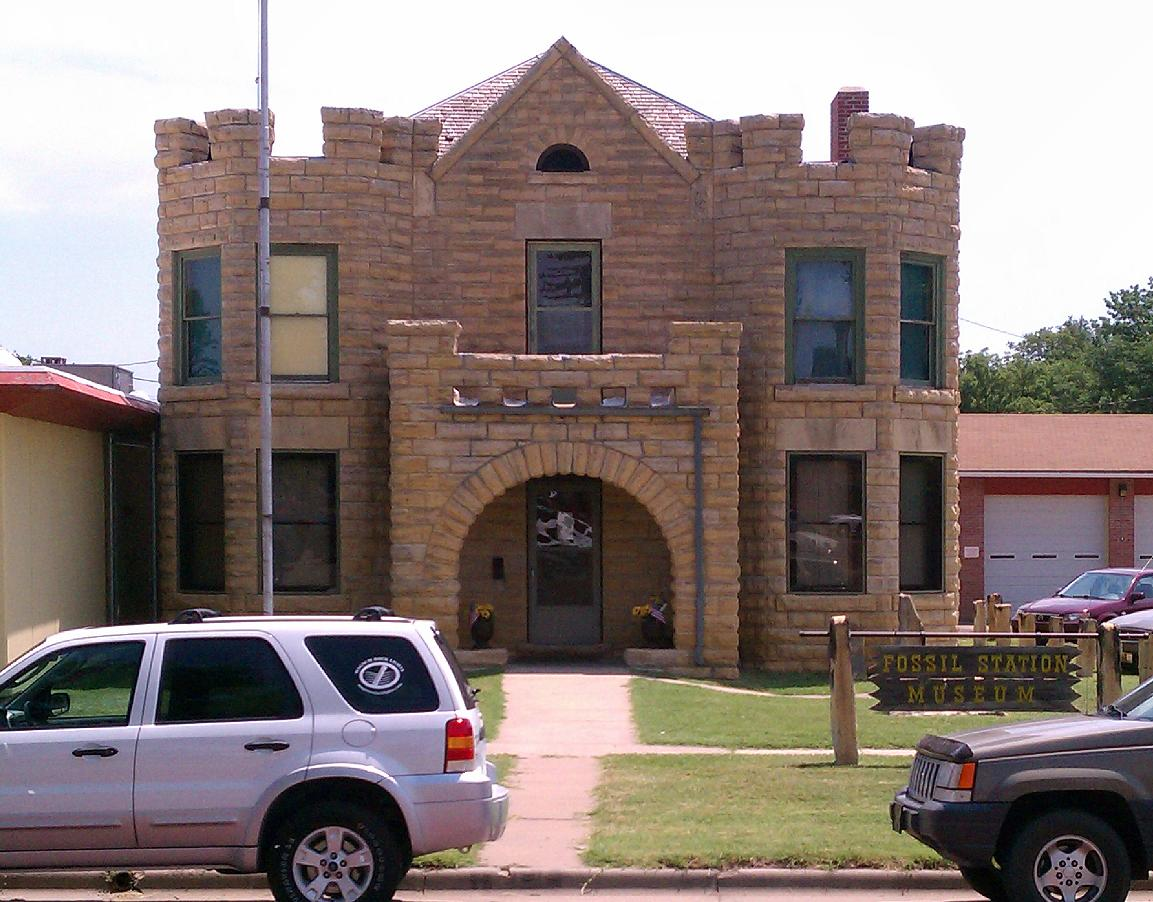
The Fossil Station Museum (2011)

=== Arts and music ===
Located downtown, the Deines Cultural Center is a non-profit art gallery that hosts exhibits featuring the work of local and regional artists. Its permanent collections consist of paintings by Birger Sandzén and the wood engravings of local artist E. Hubert Deines. In addition, the center also hosts concerts, recitals, lectures, readings, and workshops. The Center opened in 1990 with the Deines family's donation of its building, the Deines engravings, and a cash endowment to the city of Russell.

=== Ad Astra Music Festival ===
In the month of July, Russell hosts the Ad Astra Music Festival, a concert series featuring student and professional artists from all over the United States and the world. Music performed ranges from classical to contemporary compositions and jazz. The festival was started in 2015.

=== Events ===
The city hosts the annual Russell County Free Fair during the last week of July. Sponsored by local businesses and organizations, the Fair includes a 4-H livestock sale, carnival, live music, and other entertainment. Other annual events include the annual Blarney Stone Hunt, the Independence Day Freedom Fireworks Celebration, Bricks, Broncs & BBQ and Flatland Car & Cycle Show the first weekend in October, the Lighted Christmas Parade, and Weihnachtsfest, a Christmas festival held the second Saturday in December for over 25 years.

Every ten years since 1941, Russell has held Prairiesta, a festival commemorating the city's foundation and celebrating its heritage. Held in June, the festival includes a parade, carnival rides, live music, arts and crafts exhibits, and a historical pageant.

=== Points of interest ===
The Fossil Station Museum, also located in downtown Russell, displays artifacts from Russell County history dating back to the mid-1800s. Home to the Russell County Historical Society, the museum is housed in the former sheriff's office and county jail, a fortress-like structure constructed of native "post rock" limestone in 1907.

The Russell County Historical Society has restored and maintains two examples of early limestone homes built in Russell, the Gernon House and the Heym-Oliver House. The Gernon House was built in 1872 by blacksmith Nicholas Gernon, one of the town's original settlers, and doubled as a smithery. The Heym-Oliver House was built by settler Nicholas Heym in 1878.

The Oil Patch Museum, located just north of I-70 Exit 184, houses exhibits on area geology and the history of local petroleum drilling, production, and transportation.

=== Libraries ===
The Russell Public Library, located downtown on West Wisconsin (6th) Street, is the city's main library. A member of the Central Kansas Library System, it has a collection of more than 32,000 volumes. The library opened in 1901 and expanded into a Carnegie library in 1907, finally moving to its current facility in 1962.

== Parks and recreation ==
The city government's Park Department maintains seven parks in the city. The largest is Memorial Park, located on the north side of the U.S. 40 business route in the far eastern part of the city. It includes baseball fields, tennis courts, a skateboard park, a play park, a frisbee golf course, and Russell Municipal Golf Course. The municipal course is a 9-hole, regulation length course that opened in 1952. In addition, the city government operates a municipal swimming pool next to Memorial Park.

== Government ==
Russell is a city of the second class with a council-mayor-manager form of government. The city council consists of eight members, two elected for each city ward. The council sets policies and approves the city budget, meeting on the first and third Tuesday of each month at 4:30 p.m. in the City Council Room at the City Hall. The city manager is hired by the council, enforces its policies, serves as its chief adviser, prepares the city budget, and administers city government personnel. The mayor presides at council meetings, serves as spokesperson for the city, and represents the city in intergovernmental relations.

As the county seat, Russell is the administrative center of Russell County. The county courthouse is located downtown, and all departments of the county government base their operations in the city.

Russell lies within Kansas's 1st U.S. Congressional District, represented by Tracey Mann (R-Salina). For the purposes of representation in the Kansas Legislature, the city is located in the 36th district of the Kansas Senate, represented by Sen. Elaine Bowers (R-Concordia) and the 109th district of the Kansas House of Representatives, represented by Rep. Troy Waymaster (R-Bunker Hill).

== Education ==
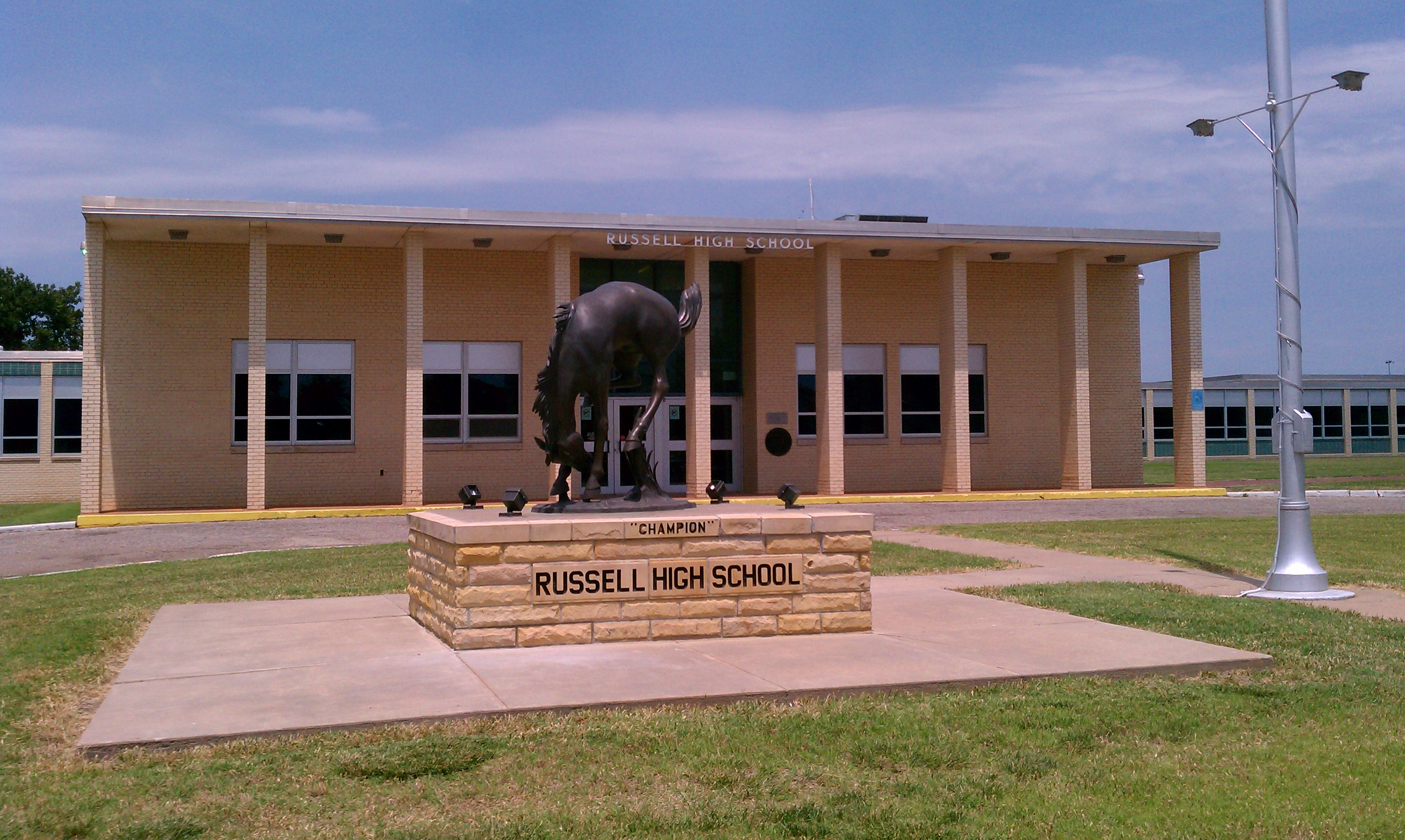
Russell High School (2011)

The community is served by Russell County USD 407 public school district, and operates four public schools in the city:

- Russell High School (9-12)
- Ruppenthal Middle School (6-8)
- Bickerdyke Elementary School (2-5)
- Simpson Elementary School (K-1)

== Media ==
The Russell County News is the local newspaper, published weekly on Thursdays. It was a daily newspaper until 2000, then was a twice-weekly newspaper from 2001 to 2015.

Three radio stations broadcast from Russell. KRSL broadcasts on 990 AM, playing a Classic Country format. Its sister station KRSL-FM broadcasts on 95.9 FM, playing a Classic Hits format. KCCV-FM, a Christian station in Overland Park, Kansas, operates a translator station in Russell which broadcasts on 95.1 FM.

Russell is in the Wichita-Hutchinson, Kansas television market. KAKE, the ABC affiliate in Wichita, operates a translator station (K38GH) in Russell which broadcasts on analog channel 38. KBSH-DT, KOCW, and KSNC, the respective satellite stations of the CBS, Fox, and NBC affiliates in Wichita, are located in neighboring counties, placing Russell within their broadcast radius. Smoky Hills Public Television, the PBS affiliate for western Kansas, has its headquarters in nearby Bunker Hill.

== Infrastructure ==
=== Transportation ===
Interstate 70 and U.S. Route 40 run concurrently east–west immediately south of Russell, intersecting U.S. Route 281, which runs north–south through the town, at Exit 184. U.S. Route 40 Business follows U.S. 281 north 1.5 miles to its intersection with the old alignment of U.S. 40, which runs east–west through Russell. The business route then follows the old alignment east, ending at its intersection with I-70 at exit 189.

Russell Municipal Airport is located southeast of the city on the U.S. 40 business route. Publicly owned, it has two runways, one concrete and one turf, and is used for general aviation.

Union Pacific Railroad operates one freight rail line, the Kansas Pacific (KP) Line, through Russell. It runs east–west through the city.

=== Utilities ===
Electricity production and distribution, recycling and trash removal, waste water management, and water production and distribution are all provided by separate departments of the city government. Eagle Communication and Rural Telephone provide landline telephone service; Eagle Communication and Nex-Tech offer cable television and internet access. Most residents use natural gas for heating fuel; service is provided by Kansas Gas Service.

=== Health care ===
Russell Regional Hospital is the sole hospital in the city. Established in 1942, it is a private, non-profit, 54-bed general medical and surgical facility.

== Notable people ==
Notable individuals who were born in and/or have lived in Russell include:

- Philip Anschutz (1939–), business magnate
- Sue Anschutz-Rodgers (1936–), cattle ranch owner and philanthropist
- Wendall Anschutz (1938–2010), news anchor
- Judith Barzilay (1944–), U.S. federal judge
- Steven Bender (1950–2010), technology entrepreneur
- Curt Dawson (1939–1985), stage and television actor
- Bob Dole (1923–2021), former Senate Republican leader (1985–1996)
- Steve Doocy (1956–), news anchor
- Marj Dusay (1936–2020), actress
- Paul Eggert (1954–), computer scientist and maintainer of the tz database
- Asa Kinney (1810–1886), pioneer and politician
- Jim Line (1926–2013), University of Kentucky basketball player
- C.J. Mahoney (1977–), Deputy United States Trade Representative
- Larry Ochs (1924–2003), mayor of Colorado Springs, Colorado
- Arlen Specter (1930–2012), U.S. senator from Pennsylvania
- Walter Sutton (1877–1916), geneticist
- Troy Waymaster, member, Kansas House of Representatives
