= Anschutz Family Foundation =

Colorado-based private foundation

- Formation: 1982; 44 years ago
- Founders: Fred Anschutz; Marian Pfister Anschutz
- Type: Private foundation
- Tax ID no.: 74-2132676
- Legal status: 501(c)(3) organization
- Headquarters: Denver, Colorado, U.S.
- Method: Grants
- Key people: Sue Anschutz-Rodgers (president)
- Endowment: $63 million (1982–2026)
- Employees: 5
- Website: anschutzfamilyfoundation.org

The Anschutz Family Foundation is a Denver-based private foundation founded in 1982 by businessman Fred Anschutz and his wife, Marian Pfister Anschutz. The couple's daughter, Sue Anschutz-Rodgers, serves as the foundation's president. Since 1982, the Anschutz Family Foundation has distributed over 9,000 grants worth more than $63 million to nonprofit organizations.

The Anschutz Family Foundation focuses on "community development and programs aimed at the economically disadvantaged, children and youth, seniors, and people with disabilities", though it has also donated to political organizations. The foundation is the sole donor to The Foundation for a Better Life, a nonprofit espousing "positive role models".

== History ==
The Anschutz Family Foundation was formed in 1982 by Colorado businessman Fred Anschutz and his wife, Marian Pfister Anschutz, who endowed $4.6 million to the foundation. A year after its founding, the couple's daughter, Sue Anschutz-Rodgers, was appointed executive director and president.

Choosing to prioritize grants for communities outside of Colorado's densely-populated Front Range area, Anschutz-Rodgers established Colorado Rural Philanthrophy Days (CRPD) in 1991. CRPD is a biannual conference where other "urban" foundations travel to various rural counties to "enhanc[e] nonprofit capacity". Anschutz-Rodgers later gave the role of executive director to Abel Wurmnest, who works alongside two program officers and a grants manager. The Anschutz Family Foundation has regularly donated to the Common Sense Institute, a conservative think tank.

The foundation has over $66 million in assets and has given over $63 million in at least 9,000 grants. In 2022, 43% of the foundation's funding was directed to rural Colorado. In 2024, the Anschutz Family Foundation directed over 58% of grants towards rural communities or statewide services. The foundation issues over $2 million worth of grants yearly, nearly all of which are for less than $10,000 each. As of 2021, four of Fred and Marian Anschutz's grandchildren and five of their great-grandchildren sit on the board of the foundation.
