= 2026 Washington Initiative 638 =

Referendum on transgender athletes

- November 3, 2026
- This measure would prohibit students it defines as "biologically male" from competing in certain school athletic activities intended for female students only. It would require verification of biological sex by students' healthcare providers. Should this measure be enacted into law?
- Reporting: 99% as of November 18, 8:50 PM PST
- Outcome: Approved

Results
Choice	Votes	%
Yes	1,778,588	55.93%
No	1,401,525	44.07%
County results
Yes
80–90%
70–80%
60–70%
50–60%
No
50–60%
- Source: NBC News and the Associated Press

Initiative 638 is a 2026 statutory ballot initiative that appeared before voters in Washington State during the 2026 general election. The measure requires students participating in K–12 girls' or women's sports to submit medical documentation that verifies their "biological sex" as female. This prohibits transgender girls from competing in school athletic activities intended for females, and requires verification of a student's biological sex to determine eligibility.

Supporters argued the measure would preserve fair competition and equal athletic opportunity for all girls due to the sports-relevant sex differences in human physiology. Critics warned it would add intrusive eligibility checks to school physicals, could put students at risk of forced outing, may be legally challenged under Washington's WLAD or state ERA, and could erode non-sports antidiscrimination protections if allowed to be enacted.

K–12 students in Washington State have been permitted to compete on sports teams that align with their gender identity since 2007. Washington State was the first U.S. state to adopt a policy allowing this.

== Background ==
=== Existing policies ===
Washington law already regulates equal access to school athletics; RCW 28A.640.020 states that schools must offer access to athletic and recreational activities "to all students without regard to sex". Schools may offer separate teams for boys' and girls' athletics, provided that the provision of opportunities for competition, equipment, coaching, medical services, and scheduling of access to facilities is conducted "with no disparities based on sex". Separately, RCW 28A.642.010 prohibits discrimination in public schools based on protected characteristics, including but not limited to gender expression and identity. In 2007, the Washington Interscholastic Activities Association (WIAA) adopted guidance and practices, adapted from the then-policy of the USOC and NCAA, for accommodating transgender athletes in its competitions, becoming the first U.S. state to explicitly adopt such guidance.

Amid the 2020s anti-LGBTQ movement, President Donald Trump enacted executive orders in 2025 that order the federal government to cease recognition of gender identity and recognize "male" and "female" as referring to biological sex only, and instructing the federal government to take action to prohibit trans women from participating in women's sports. The latter includes mandating an interpretation of Title IX declaring trans women in women's sports to be sex discrimination, thus serving as a basis to strip federal funding. In some school districts, such as Puyallup School District and Tacoma Public Schools, most funding is provided by the state, with federal funding only accounting for a smaller percentage of their budgets.

As of 2026, according to the Office of Public Instruction, there are approximately only 5 to 10 transgender girls participating in school sports out of the 1.2 million K–12 students in Washington State. However, a few cases have attracted heavy media attention due to associated backlash from conservatives, including a student who pulled out of a girls' basketball game in Tumwater, Washington over a trans student-athlete on the opposing team, and a high school wrestler who has attempted to pursue legal action after unknowingly facing a trans woman in a match. The Seattle Times noted that while "a few transgender girls have won at the high school level, across the U.S., just a few trans women have competed at elite college or professional levels, and none have dominated their sport";

The U.S. Department of Education announced investigations into alleged Title IX violations by the Tumwater School District and multiple Pierce County school districts for allowing transgender girls to compete in girls' competitions.

The Tumwater School District controversially passed a resolution calling on the WIAA to adopt policies prohibiting trans women from participating in girls' sports. This resolution was unsuccessful, but Initiative 638 passing accomplished the same thing.

=== Initiative petition ===
On June 2, 2025, the political action committee Let's Go Washington, led by conservative hedge fund executive Brian Heywood, filed the Initiative 638 petition with the Washington secretary of state's office. The petition was cleared to begin gathering signatures on June 13, with it receiving a serial number, ballot title, and ballot summary the same day. On January 2, 2026, the group submitted 445,187 signatures to be reviewed. State law requires the Office of the Secretary of State to conduct a sample search of 3% of the submitted signatures; signature verification was completed on January 22, and Secretary of State Steve Hobbs notified the legislature on that day.

After the signature verification, an initiative is required to go to the state legislature which can choose to pass it as is, thereby avoiding a public vote; pass an additional alternative ballot measure that will appear on the ballot alongside the original, or take no action, which sends the measure to the ballot for voters to decide. In any case, the legislature cannot amend the measure or stop it from appearing on the ballot if they refuse to pass it themselves as is. The legislature ultimately decided to take no action on Initiative 638, and therefore, it appeared on the November 3, 2026 ballot.

The group Let's Go Washington was also backing a separate referendum, Initiative 001, which sought to roll back changes that the state legislature made in 2025, that changed a parental rights law it had initiated. That initiative failed to pass.

The Office of Financial Management estimated a one-time state cost of approximately $21,00 to update guidance. Schools districts could incur additional costs to revise policies and procedures, but the office could not determine those amounts. Its projected no change in state or local revenue and assumed an effective date December 3,2026, if voters approved the measure. These estimates address government implementation costs rather than a specified reimbursement program for families' medical expenses.

== Contents ==
On the ballot, Washington voters were shown the following question and information:

Initiative Measure No. IL26-638

Initiative Measure No. IL26-638 concerns participation in athletics at K–12 schools.

This measure would prohibit students it defines as "biologically male" from competing in certain school athletic activities intended for female students only. It would require verification of biological sex by students' healthcare providers.

Should this measure be enacted into law?

O Yes

O No

The initiative amends the Revised Code of Washington to require non-profit entities which regulate interscholastic athletics in the state to "prohibit biologically male students from competing with and against female students", in K–12 athletics activities where teams or participants are separated by sex. Girls who compete in girls' athletics events must have their biological sex verified by a healthcare provider, as determined by "reproductive anatomy, genetic makeup, or normal endogenously produced testosterone levels". Birth certificates would not be permitted as a method to verify biological sex.

== Campaign ==
The initiative was largely promoted by Let's Go Washington, while the opponents have coalesced into No Hate in WA State. Proponents of the initiative claim it would only apply to middle and high school students; opponents argue, however, that the initiative text does not contain such limits and therefore could apply to younger elementary schoolers as well. Heywood stated that trans women being prohibited from women's sports was "common sense" and a "bipartisan" issue, explaining that "But forcing boys into girls' spaces, onto their podiums, into their locker rooms, without any real discussion, I think that's the most undemocratic thing I've ever heard."

No Hate in WA State has argued that Initiative 638's provisions could subject all female students to unnecessary medical examinations or testing. Let's Go Washington rejects these arguments, claiming there are several ways sex could be verified, but conceded that the initiative's text does not explicitly name these. Concerns have also been raised that the initiative does not detail how exactly schools would carry out the verification process, who would bear the costs of any medical or genetic testing, how cases involving intersex students would be handled, or what would happen if a girl lacks a regular family doctor and therefore would not have medical records on file verifying their sex.

Under the initiative, birth certificates would not be permitted as a method to verify biological sex (as the state of Washington allows people to change the sex written on their birth certificate if that is in conflict with their purported gender identity), and because the initiative does not say who will pay for any medical or genetic tests, families may end up having to pay out-of-pocket for it since such tests are usually not covered by insurance unless they are deemed "medically necessary". Proponents of the initiative have also argued that nothing would change and doctors could verify sex during a sports physical. However, several doctors in Washington State who perform sports physicals on students have argued that that sports physicals normally check things like heart health, vision, and breathing and that they have never had to verify a student's sex to certify them sports-ready before, and that the initiative would require more invasive methods of verifying sex during sports physicals—the likes of which are opposed by major medical organizations including the American Academy of Pediatrics, American College of Sports Medicine, and American Academy of Family Physicians. Doctors also noted that the forms offered by the state for such exams do not include verification of sex. The WIAA also said its current rules do not require verifying sex or DNA testing or hormone testing. The Washington Chapter of the American Academy of Pediatrics additionally objected to the idea of a blood test, noting that verification through hormone testing or genetic analysis often require lab work, saying "If you're doing blood tests, who pays for those? Are we now going to have a financial bar to enter into sports participation? And if you get the blood test, who interprets it?"

Proponents of Initiative 638 argue that doctors could rely on a student's medical history to verify their sex. However, some doctors refute this arguing that under the initiative "old records cannot be used" and even if they could be used, obtaining them could be hard, especially for the many students who "change doctors frequently or do not have a regular doctor".

In the official voters' pamphlet, supporters argued that the initiative would protect girls' competitive opportunities, awards, and access to college recruitment. They maintained that healthcare providers could verify sex using existing records or routine care. Opponents argued that the verification requirement could lead to intrusive examinations or costly testing and discourage girls from participating in sports. These statements represent the arguments submitted by the opposing campaigns committees.

In August 2026, Let's Go Washington cited an recommendation from American Academy of Pediatrics (AAP) that children get routine exams for unrelated reasons, buttressing their arguments that doctors could use such exams to verify biological sex. This argument appeared in the Washington voters' guide. The AAP rejected this argument and asked the references to them be removed from voter guides, saying they had not given permission for their name to be used in the voter guide and expressing concern that the way the language was written could mislead voters into thinking the AAP supports the ballot measure. Let's Go Washington declined to remove the AAP reference.

During the campaign, proponents emphasized that the initiative was important to ensuring "fairness, safety, and competitive balance in female sports." Opponents largely avoided discussing how the initiatives impact transgender rights and instead focused on the unclear wording in the initiative text, which they say contradicts proponents' claims on what the initiative would do, and emphasized keeping the government out of personal decision making. Despite disagreeing with their opponents ads, a spokesperson for Let's Go Washington acknowledged that the messaging strategy was effective.

== Endorsements ==
=== Support ===
Evangelist Franklin Graham posted on X that "a male, who had raced on the boy's team for his school earlier in the season, was now racing against them as a girl. ... I pray that our nation will wake up and put an end to this nonsense."

Regional radio host Lars Larson wrote about the initiative in an opinion article for Clark County Today. He said, "Adult coaches stayed silent as the LGBT political activists used girls to traffic their message. Shame on creeps like State School Superintendent Chris Reykdahl [sic] and every school board member who either stayed silent ... or openly supported his outrage. Half a century ago, America passed laws like Title 9 to make sure girls got equal opportunity ... and in the last 10 years, the Democratic Party surrendered those opportunities to win points for politics. When you mark your ballot, make those enemies of childhood pay and vote yes on initiative 638."

Legislation In Other States

Other states have adopted different documentation requirements for schools sports. Texas's 2021 House bill 25 tied participation to the sex recorded on a qualifying birth certificate, with another governent record permitted when that cerificate is unavailable. Floridas statute also recognized birth certificate filed at or near birth as evidence of sex at birth. Washington's proposed initative instead requires verification through a healthcare provider's signed statement.

Campaign funding

Campaign finance reports document both monetary contributions and donated services. A 2026 filing by No Hate In WA State reported $6,447.86 in june staff services from ACLU of Washinton, divided equally between opposition to IL26-001 and IL26-638. A separate filling by Lets Go Washinton reported $2,700 in monetary contributions deposited on May 22, 2026. These individuals reported are examples of disclosed support, rather than complete fundraising totals for initiative 638.

Yes

State legislators

- John Braun, LD-20 (2013–present) (Republican)
- Judy Warnick, LD-13 (2015–present) (Republican)

Individuals

- Carol Brown, Olympic rower
- Lars Larson, conservative Portland radio host

Organizations

- Moms for Liberty Washington
- Washington State Catholic Conference
- Washington State Young Republicans
- Women's Liberation Front
- XX-XY Athletics

Political parties

- Washington State Republican Party

=== Opposition ===
In October 2026, it was reported that over 100 pediatricians and nurses were working with the No Hate in WA State campaign to assist in defeating the measure.

Human Rights Watch expressed concern that the initiative could have a disproportionate impact on girls who are racial minorities, noting that some black cisgender females athletes including Serena Williams and Brittney Griner have been falsely accused of being transgender due to being "perceived as not feminine enough, too muscular, intimidating or masculine."

The Seattle Times editorial board attacked the initiative as deceptive and harmful, warning: "IL 26-638 would send Washington back to the days of “femininity certificates,” when amateur women athletes, including Olympic athletes, had to carry proof that they had passed visual exams and chromosome testing that proved they were women. Under this proposed initiative, parents of girls as young as 12 could be subject to this violation of privacy."

Several healthcare providers have raised concerning about the possibility of students having to undergo invasive genital exams, with one school nurse pointing out that some schools examine students for sports readiness in batches fully clothed which could create issues if doctors become required to perform more intimate exams to verify sex. The healthcare providers also expressed concern that DNA, hormonal and genetic tests are not a routine part of these exams and would require extra costs that parents would likely have to cover.

Spokane-area family physicians Dr. Libby Loft and Dr. Luis Manriquez criticized the costs for girls in youth sports in an opinion article for The Spokesman-Review. They wrote, "How does megamillionaire Brian Heywood, the sponsor of I-638, want Washingtonians to pay for these expensive unnecessary tests? Insurance companies surely won't be footing the bill. According to Labcorp, costs for testosterone hormone testing is $162.75 and for genetic sex chromosome testing, it's more than $1,300. Forcing working families of the estimated 110,000 female students who play sports in Washington to pay for unnecessary medical tests in order to exclude an estimated 5–10 trans girls from being able to play too is outrageous."

Forbes described Initiative 638 as "one of the most intrusive anti-trans bills in the country".

No

U.S. senators

- Patty Murray, Washington (1993–present) (Democratic)

U.S. representatives

- Suzan DelBene, WA-01 (2012–present) (Democratic)
- Marie Gluesenkamp Perez, WA-03 (2023–present) (Democratic)
- Pramila Jayapal, WA-07 (2017–present) (Democratic)

Statewide officials

- Bob Ferguson, governor of Washington (2025–present) (Democratic)
- Chris Reykdal, Washington State Superintendent of Public Instruction (2017–present) (Democratic)

State legislators

- Laurie Jinkins, speaker of the Washington House of Representatives (2020–present) from LD-27 (2011–present) (Democratic)
- Jamie Pedersen, majority leader of the Washington State Senate (2025–present) from LD-43 (2013–present) (Democratic)
- Yasmin Trudeau, LD-27 (2021–present) (Democratic)
- My-Linh Thai, LD-41 (2019–present) (Democratic)

Local officials

- Girmay Zahilay, King County executive (2025–present) (Democratic)
- Alexis Mercedes Rinck, member of the Seattle City Council from Position 8 (2024–present) (Democratic)

Individuals

- Megan Rapinoe, soccer player
- Jaelynn Scott, transgender rights activist (Democratic)

Labor unions

- AFSCME Council 28
- SEIU 775
- United Auto Workers
- Washington Education Association
- Washington State Labor Council

Organizations

- ACLU Washington
- Fuse Washington
- Gender Justice League
- Greater Seattle Business Association
- League of Women Voters of Washington
- Northwest Progressive Institute
- Planned Parenthood Alliance Advocates of Washington
- Seattle Democratic Socialists of America
- Seattle Indivisible
- Transit Riders Union
- Washington Academy of Family Physicians
- Washington State Nurses Association
- Washington State PTA
- Washington State Stonewall Democrats

Political parties

- Green Party of Washington State
- Washington State Democratic Party

Newspapers and media

- The Columbian
- The Daily of the University of Washington
- The Seattle Times
- The Stranger
- The Urbanist
- Seattle Gay News

Government bodies

- Issaquah City Council
- King County Council
- Mountlake Terrace City Council
- Seattle City Council
- Seattle School Board
- Shoreline City Council
- Spokane City Council
- Tacoma City Council
- Vancouver City Council

== Aftermath and future ==
=== Response ===
Following the passage of Initiative 638, Democratic Party officials and LGBTQ+ and human rights groups criticized the outcome and discussed possible legal challenges.

Washington State Democratic Party chair Shasti Conrad criticized the outcome of the initiative said "Washington state now has one of the worst anti-LGBT, anti-trans initiatives, truly, in the entire country,” It's so horrific that people wouldn't allow themselves to really grasp how real this is. ... To every trans girl participating in school sports, please know that we support your right to play. And to every girl who will be harmed by the initiative's invasive exam requirements, we will continue the fight to protect your rights."

No Hate in Washington State campaign manager, Libby Watson said "To all trans girls participating in school sports in Washington, we want you to know that you belong: on the field, on the court, on the team. We stand with you and will continue to fight for a day when you can play sports without controversy." Regarding the potentially broader impact the passage of the measure could have, Watson said, "I think it's a very scary canary in the coal mine for future policies in Washington against the LGBTQ+ community and a dangerous signal for conservative movements across the country".

Let's Go Washington founder, Brian Heywood said "We are so excited to announce that I-638 was passed by the majority of voters this year which means that girls' sports will only be for girls in Washington State. ... This is something that was so, I think, ideologically common sense for anyone that has a daughter that it didn't matter what Trump was and what his impact was".

The Washington Interscholastic Activities Association (WIAA) said that it will "continue to follow current Washington state law" and announced that "implementation details, including updates to requirements with physicals, are undergoing legal review" and that they were reviewing implementation requirements and preparing updated guidance for schools ahead of the measure's expected December 3 effective date.

US Representative Pramila Jayapal who represents Washington's 7th congressional district said, "We are going to take our state back. We're going to start planning for how we overturn these bad initiatives and how we go back to loving everyone with gender inclusivity the way we have for decades."

Jaelynn Scott, who was elected as Washington’s first openly trans state legislator in 2026, said "the infrastructure for LGBTQ power building" had "deeply weakened" after legal activism focused on marriage equality had concluded and that without adequate funding against I-638, much of the public did not to understand the initiative and "how it was codifying discrimination into law". Scott said the legislature would repeal the law if a legal challenge failed.

The conservative Christian advocacy group Alliance Defending Freedom celebrated the passage of I-638, saying "It's very heartening to see so many voters showing up and standing up for women's sports."

Gender Justice League executive director Danni Askini criticized the initiative's passage and predicted "We're going to continue to see in 2028 this is going to continue to be an issue."

Planned Parenthood of Washington released a statement saying "the passage of I-638 is devastating for students across Washington, especially for all girls who simply want to play sports alongside their friends."

Andrew Villeneuve of the Northwest Progressive Institute (NPI), blamed the passage in large part on the language that appears on the ballot itself, which he described as a "deceptive and manipulative concise description that nicely served Brian Heywood's purposes." Villeneuve claimed that important facts about the initiative and how it would be implemented were omitted such as that Birth certificates would not be permitted as a verification method and that not every student athlete has a pediatrician or primary care provider, among other things. NPI conducted polls and research on I-638 prior to the election which found that "when voters heard arguments at length against 638, they were very receptive to voting no. But if voters didn't hear measure-specific arguments against it that reframed the matter, a majority of voters casting ballots were likely to vote yes. Unfortunately, voters did not hear those arguments [on the ballot itself]. But this does suggest a path exists to winning on this issue in a future vote."

The Seattle Times shared a similar sentiment to Villeneuve saying, "I-638 performed well in polls, especially when voters were presented only with the basic language that appeared on the ballot. That language said the initiative would prohibit “biologically male” students from competing in school sports “intended for female students only.”

Lanae Erickson, a senior vice president at the centrist think tank Third Way, said the outcome of the initiative’s results "make sense" because most voters "feel like the status quo is chaotic".

Other opponents of the initiative blame its passage on "longstanding biases and a well-funded national effort by conservatives to generate fear about trans people", with Democratic state House Speaker Laurie Jinkins speculating that more voters would have opposed the initiative if they knew a trans girl personally and Pam Stuart, a Sammamish City Council member wondering if whether "more emphasis on upholding civil rights for transgender people" could have helped.

The result also prompted discussion about the future of transgender rights ballot measures. Political observers noted that the initiative had attracted support from voters across party lines despite Washington's Democratic-leaning electorate. The Washington State Standard reported that the measure received majority support in 36 of Washington's 39 counties, while Heywood suggested that Let's Go Washington intended to continue its political activities.

Following the initiative's passage, Snopes published a fact-check examining claims opponents of the initiative that the measure would require girls participating in school sports to undergo genital examinations, which proponents of the initiative deny. Snopes found that although the initiative does not explicitly mandate genital examinations, it requires healthcare providers to verify students' sex using reproductive anatomy, genetic makeup, or naturally produced testosterone levels. The fact-check noted that genital examinations could be the most accessible option for many families because of the cost of genetic and hormone testing and the fact that birth certificates could not be used. It also cited concerns raised by the Washington State Parent Teacher Association that the requirements could disproportionately affect rural, uninsured, and lower-income families. Ultimately, Snopes rated the claim that Initiative 638 "may subject children who want to play in girls' sports to genital inspections" as "True".

=== Legal challenge and potential repeal ===
Gender Justice League executive director Danni Askini confirmed that the organization was discussing possible litigation with partner organizations, particularly a challenge under the Washington Constitution's privacy protections. Lawyers with the ACLU have promised to fight the ban with discrimination lawsuits. No Hate in Washington State campaign manager, Libby Watson also said said No Hate in Washington State would be looking at avenues to fight the ban.

Washington State Democratic Party chair Shasti Conrad said "the fight over I-638 is just beginning" and called the initiative "unconstitutional on its face" under the state constitution and announced that the party would support legal challenges seeking to overturn the measure.

If I-638 faces a legal challenge, Washington's attorney general, Nick Brown would be required to defend the initiative in court. Given that Brown has a record of staunchly supporting and defending trans rights, proponents of the initiative have expressed concern that he may not adequately defend the law.

The Northwest Progressive Institute's Andrew Villeneuve explained that the first step to challenging I-638 will be to seek a preliminary injunction to prevent any government agency in Washington State from implementing the initiative, noting this could happen as soon as the same month it passed.

Legal experts said the initiative would likely be challenged under the Washington Law Against Discrimination or the Washington state Constitution's equal rights amendment. Experts also expect plaintiff's to argue that the law conflicts with Washington State's anti discrimination laws due to it only applying to girls sports, but not boys sports. They also expect it to be challenged for violating the "right to privacy" in the state constitution due to its sex verification requirement. Some legal experts as well as opponents of the initiative said if the law survives a state constitutional challenge, it could lead to other aspects of state's antidiscrimination protections being rewritten. Proponents of the initiative deny this. Proponents of the initiative also pointed to the United States Supreme Court ruling upholding similar laws in Idaho and West Virginia. However, neither of those states have the robust statewide protections for transgender rights that Washington State does and that I-638 would be challenged under.

The Seattle Education Association (SEA) noted that a legal challenge would take place in Washington State courts which could overturn the measure due to it being a statutory measure. Additionally, SEA noted that a legal challenge in Washington State courts would allow them to avoid a ruling by the federal courts or the U.S. Supreme Court, which have been increasingly unfavorable to trans rights in recent years.

On November 9, 2026, the Seattle Public School Board held a special board meeting where they unanimously voted to pass a resolution authorizing the school district to take legal action against I-638. The vote was praised by Seattle mayor Katie Wilson who said "I support the Seattle Public Schools Board's decision to challenge Initiative 638, because every young person in Seattle deserves to thrive as their authentic self."

Additionally, opponents have discussed the possibility of having the state legislature repeal the law. The Washington state Constitution allows the legislature to amend or repeal ballot initiatives with a two-thirds supermajority vote in the first two years after passing and only a simple majority vote after two years. The Washington State Senate currently lacks the two-thirds Democratic supermajority needed to repeal the law in the first two years, making a legal challenge the more likely path to overturning the initiative in the short term. Jaelynn Scott, who was elected as Washington’s first openly trans state legislator in 2026 said, "If for some reason the legal challenge doesn’t work, then in the state legislature, we damn sure are going to repeal that law in two years."

On November 5, 2026, opponents of the measure held a rally demanding the legislature take action to repeal the measure.

On November 10, 2026, a state court lawsuit was filed in King County Superior Court seeking to overturn the initiative. The plaintiffs are parents of both cisgender and transgender students, the Washington Education Association, and TransFamilies, a nonprofit organization. They are being represented by Pacifica Law Group, Legal Voice and the American Civil Liberties Union (ACLU) of Washington. The lawsuit alleges multiple violations to the state constitution regarding privacy, equal rights and the right to equal education as well as violations to state antidiscrimination laws.

On November 17, 2026, a host of medical organizations including, the Washington State Medical Association, the American College of Obstetricians and Gynecologists, the Washington Academy of Family Physicians, the Washington Academy of Physician Associates, the Washington Chapter of the American Academy of Pediatrics, the Washington Chapter of the American College of Physicians, and the Washington State Psychiatric Association announced their support for the ACLU's lawsuit challenging Initiative 638, saying that the initiative "does not clearly define what constitutes a health examination nor does it identify what physicians must do to comply with the verification requirement options", noting that none of the proposed methods of verification are part of routine sports physicals and adding that implementing it would create "unnecessary challenges for students, families, schools, and the overall healthcare system", among other concerns.

== Analysis ==
Several news outlets, advocates and political experts noted prior to the initiative passing that it could influence political trends throughout the nation as it's passage would likely lead to a slew of anti-trans ballot initiatives showing up in other states.

Opponents of the initiative said that if allowed to stand, it could erode antidiscrimination protections unrelated to sports. Proponents of the initiative disagreed, and said that it was narrowly tailored. The Washington Interscholastic Activities Association (WIAA) stated, "The application of I-638 and any accompanying changes would need to undergo legal review and through the State of Washington Attorney General's office."

Several news outlets and experts noted that conservative advocacy groups had largely passed as many anti-trans policies as they could through state legislatures in Republican-controlled states, and are increasingly turning their efforts to Democratic-controlled states. However, the legislatures in Democrat-controlled states have refused to pass any of the anti-trans legislation being enacted in Republican-controlled states, leading to conservative advocacy groups to turn to the ballot initiative process as an attempt to circumvent the legislature.

Several news outlets, advocates and political experts compared the anti-trans ballot measures in 2026 to the push to ban or restrict gay rights via over three dozen ballot initiatives in the 1990s and early 2000s, particularly in 2004 and in 2008 with California's Proposition 8.

Prior to the 2026 midterms election, Republicans expressed hope that such measures could increase voter enthusiasm and turnout among Republican voters much like how religious groups had hoped the ballot measures banning gay marriage would increase enthusiasm and voter turnout for George W. Bush in 2004. Although, Reid Wilson, the founder of Pluribus News, expressed skepticism that this strategy would work, noting that despite Bush winning the 2004 presidential election, a lot of the academic research and Bush's own campaign advisers said he would have still won without those measures. Following the 2026 midterm elections, this strategy was ultimately shown to be unsuccessful as Democrats still won the election in a landslide despite the passage of Initiative 638.

Keith Schipper, a Nevada-based political consultant for Republicans predicted before I-638 passed, that it passing "will certainly send shock waves ... In Washington state of all places, that's always going to make people's eyes pop out." Schipper added that the passage of the initiative could be "a bat signal this is still a winning issue for us, even in a tough election year for Republicans."

Dean Nielsen, a Washington-based political consultant for Democrats predicted before I-638 passed, that it passing "will probably be hailed by conservatives as an important success in a blue state and a model to follow elsewhere".

Jaelynn Scott, who was elected as Washington’s first openly trans state legislator in 2026 and is the executive director of the advocacy organization Lavender Rights Project, expressed concern before the measure passed that, it passing could lead to Democratic leaders distancing themselves from LGBTQ+ issues, out of fear of provoking additional conservative attacks, saying such a scenario would be "well-intended, but I think misguided, because Republicans will keep trying to undermine inclusive policies no matter what".

Danni Askini, the executive director of the trans-rights organization, Gender Justice League said before the measure passed that, if the initiative passes, it should prompt "a reckoning" by Washington Democrats and a call to action to ask "very serious questions about what is happening in the state. Why has the support for trans people been so lackluster, and how are we going to fix that?"

In October 2026, the presidents, CEOs and executive directors for various LGBTQ+ rights groups including Transgender Law Center, GLAAD, Lambda Legal, Advocates for Trans Equality and the Human Rights Campaign authored a joint article raising alarm that ballot initiatives like Initiative 638 and Missouri's Amendment 3 would "serve as testing grounds for the 2028 Presidential election", noting that if the measures passed, political operatives would stress-test field operations, construct voter databases, analyze which misinformation about LGBTQ people can flip a swing district and perfect fear-based messaging on it. The groups warned that such measures passing in 2026 could lead to the 2028 election cycle being "flooded with divisive proposals to ban inclusive books, erase LGBTQ families from classrooms, and roll back everything from enshrined reproductive freedom to employment nondiscrimination."

== See also ==
- 2026 Colorado Proposition 135
- 2026 United States ballot measures
- 2026 Missouri Amendment 3
- 2026 Washington Initiative 001
- 2026 Washington Initiative 645
- 2008 California Proposition 8
- 2009 Washington Referendum 71
