= 2026 Washington Initiative 001 =

- November 3, 2026
- Parent's Bill of Rights
- Reporting: 99% as of November 18, 8:48 PM PST
- Outcome: Rejected

Results
Choice	Votes	%
Yes	1,481,202	47.58%
No	1,631,723	52.42%
County results
Yes
70–80%
60–70%
50–60%
No
60–70%
50–60%
- Source: The Associated Press

Initiative 001 was a legislative ballot initiative that appeared on the November 3, 2026 ballot in the U.S. state of Washington. If approved, this initiative will restore Initiative 2081 (also known as Parent's Bill of Rights) to its original state as enacted in 2024, thereby removing amendments made to the initiative in 2025 via House Bill 1296.

Supporters of the initiative argue that parents should have a right to know what is going on with their kids at school. Opponents of the initiative argue that it would negatively impact students with abusive parents, and others said that the initiative could require schools to out LGBTQ students to unsupportive parents.

The initiative failed to pass, keeping the amendments made to Initiative 2081 in 2025 via House Bill 1296 in place.

== Background ==
On June 2, 2025, the political action committee Let's Go Washington, led by conservative hedge fund executive Brian Heywood, filed the Initiative 001 petition with the Washington secretary of state's office. The petition was cleared to begin gathering signatures on June 13, with it receiving a serial number, ballot title, and ballot summary the same day. On January 2, 2026, the group submitted 445,187 signatures to be reviewed. State law requires the Office of the Secretary of State to conduct a sample search of 3% of the submitted signatures; signature verification was completed on January 22, and Secretary of State Steve Hobbs notified the legislature on that day. After the signature verification, an initiative is required to go to the state legislature which can choose to pass it as is, thereby avoiding a public vote; pass an additional alternative ballot measure that will appear on the ballot alongside the original, or take no action, which sends the measure to the ballot for voters to decide. In any case, the legislature cannot amend the measure or stop it from appearing on the ballot if they refuse to pass it themselves as is. The legislature ultimately decided to take no action on Initiative 638, and therefore, it appeared on the November 3, 2026 ballot.

The group Let's Go Washington is also backing a separate referendum, Initiative 638, seeking ban transgender girls from girls sports.

Initiative 2081, originally passed via a citizen's initiative in 2024, sought to provide and clarify rights for parents with children enrolled in Washington State public school. In addition to established state law, the Initiative 2081 gave parents the right to view classroom materials and public records, receive notification when their child obtains medial treatment, or decide to remove their children from assignments they feel conflict with their political or religious beliefs.

However, many lawmakers in the state felt that Initiative 2081 conflicted too heavily with existing state and federal laws, creating confusion for schools and teachers. In 2025, House Bill 1296 was passed, which maintained some aspects of the original bill, such as giving parents the ability to review school materials and curriculum, as well as notifying them of any abuse or misconduct. Though, several changes were enacted, including removing the ability for parents to access their child's medical, counseling and educational records kept by the school in addition to new provisions for parents to know of any unexcused absences.

Initiative 001 aims to remove the changes enacted by House Bill 1296 and to restore the original implementation of Initiative 2081.

Initiative 001, as well as the original Initiative 2081, have drawn criticism from LGBTQ rights organizations and advocates over its potential effects on the privacy of transgender and other LGBTQ students. Opponents of the initiatives have expressed concern that the measure could lead to the forced outing of students' sexual orientation or gender identity to their parents, even when there is a risk that the parents might abuse their child for it, potentially forcing LGBTQ students to remain closeted and discouraging LGBTQ students from seeking counseling or other support at school if they do not feel safe at home. For this reason, groups such as the Washington State Coalition Against Domestic Violence & Sexual Assault have opposed the initiative. Supporters of the initiative argue that parents should have access to information about their children's medical, counseling and education records including any changes in a students' sexual orientation or gender identity.

Pacifica Law Group, a Washington State lawfirm who analyzed the initiative, noted Washington State law typically allows schools to withhold student records from parents who are under investigation for child abuse or neglect or are criminal defendants in cases where the student is the alleged victim, saying "these protections recognize that children who may be victims of abuse may share personal information with counselors, nurses, and other school personnel", but that Initiative 001 would remove these protections. The lawfirm also pointed out that the current statute refers to both "parents and legal guardians" but Initiative 001 would remove the term "legal guardians" and apply only to "parents" which they expressed concern would create ambiguity whether non-parental guardians (such as foster parents, relatives, or other court-appointed guardians) are covered by the withholding rule.

== Contents ==
On the ballot, Washington voters will be shown the following question and information:

Initiative Measure No. IL26-001

Initiative Measure No. IL26-001 concerns parental rights relating to their children in public school.

This measure would repeal amendments to a statute listing certain rights of parents and guardians of public-school children and re-enact the law as it was originally enacted by Initiative to the Legislature 081.

Should this measure be enacted into law?

O Yes

O No

== Endorsements ==
=== Support ===
Yes

Individuals

- Lars Larson, conservative Portland radio host

Organizations

- Moms for Liberty Washington
- Washington State Catholic Conference
- Washington State Young Republicans
- Women's Liberation Front
- XX-XY Athletics

Political parties

- Washington State Republican Party

=== Opposition ===
No

U.S. senators

- Patty Murray, Washington (1993–present) (Democratic)

U.S. representatives

- Suzan DelBene, WA-01 (2012–present) (Democratic)
- Pramila Jayapal, WA-07 (2017–present) (Democratic)

Statewide officials

- Bob Ferguson, governor of Washington (2025–present) (Democratic)
- Chris Reykdal, Washington State Superintendent of Public Instruction (2017–present) (Democratic)

State legislators

- Laurie Jinkins, speaker of the Washington House of Representatives (2020–present) from LD-27 (2011–present) (Democratic)
- Jamie Pedersen, majority leader of the Washington State Senate (2025–present) from LD-43 (2013–present) (Democratic)
- Yasmin Trudeau, LD-27 (2021–present) (Democratic)
- My-Linh Thai, LD-41 (2019–present) (Democratic)

Local officials

- Girmay Zahilay, King County executive (2025–present) (Democratic)
- Alexis Mercedes Rinck, member of the Seattle City Council from Position 8 (2024–present) (Democratic)

Individuals

- Megan Rapinoe, soccer player
- Jaelynn Scott, transgender rights activist (Democratic)

Labor unions

- AFSCME Council 28
- SEIU 775
- United Auto Workers
- Washington Education Association
- Washington State Labor Council

Organizations

- ACLU Washington
- Fuse Washington
- Gender Justice League
- Greater Seattle Business Association
- League of Women Voters of Washington
- Northwest Progressive Institute
- Planned Parenthood Alliance Advocates of Washington
- Seattle Democratic Socialists of America
- Seattle Indivisible
- Transit Riders Union
- Washington Academy of Family Physicians
- Washington State Nurses Association
- Washington State PTA
- Washington State Stonewall Democrats

Political parties

- Green Party of Washington State
- Washington State Democratic Party

Newspapers and media

- The Columbian
- The Daily of the University of Washington
- The Seattle Times
- The Stranger
- The Urbanist
- Seattle Gay News

Government bodies

- Issaquah City Council
- King County Council
- Mountlake Terrace City Council
- Seattle City Council
- Seattle School Board
- Shoreline City Council
- Spokane City Council
- Tacoma City Council
- Vancouver City Council

== Impact and analysis ==
Several news outlets, advocates and political experts noted prior to the initiative failing that it could have influenced political trends throughout the nation as it's passage would likely lead to a slew of anti-trans ballot initiatives showing up in other states.

Several news outlets and experts noted that conservative advocacy groups had largely maxxed out what anti-trans policies they can pass through state legislatures in Republican-controlled states, and are increasingly turning their efforts to Democrat-controlled states. However, the legislatures in Democrat-controlled states have refused to pass any of the anti-trans legislation being enacted in Republican-controlled states, leading to conservative advocacy groups to turn to the ballot initiative process as an attempt to circumvent the legislature.

Several news outlets, advocates and political experts compared the anti-trans ballot measures in 2026 to the push to ban or restrict gay rights via over three dozen ballot initiatives in the 1990s and early 2000s, particularly in 2004. Prior to the 2026 midterms election, Republicans expressed hope that such measures could increase voter enthusiasm and turnout among Republican voters much like how religious groups had hoped the ballot measures banning gay marriage would increase enthusiasm and voter turnout for George W. Bush in 2004. Although, Reid Wilson, the founder of Pluribus News, expressed skepticism that this strategy would work, noting that despite Bush winning the 2004 presidential election, a lot of the academic research and Bush's own campaign advisers said he would have still won without those measures. Following the 2026 midterm elections, this strategy was ultimately shown to be unsuccessful as Democrats still won the election in a landslide.

If the initiative had passed, the legislature could have amended or repealed it with a simple majority vote, but not for two years.

== See also ==
- 2026 Washington Initiative 638
- 2026 Washington Initiative 645
- 2026 Colorado Proposition 135
- 2026 United States ballot measures
- 2026 Missouri Amendment 3
