= 2026 Colorado Proposition 135 =

Statewide referendum in Colorado, US

Proposition 135
- November 3, 2026
- Prohibit Surgery on Minors in Response to Perception of Sex or Gender
- Reporting: 99% as of November 7, 2026, 12:00 p.m. MST
- Outcome: Passed

Results
Choice	Votes	%
Yes	1,357,348	51.92%
No	1,256,772	48.08%
County results
Yes
80–90%
70–80%
60–70%
50–60%
No
70–80%
60–70%
50–60%
- Source: NBC News and the Associated Press

2026 Colorado Proposition 135 is a statutory ballot measure that appeared before voters in Colorado during the 2026 general election. The measure prohibits gender-affirming surgery for minors in the state, and would ban the use of state or federal funds, insurance coverage, or Medicaid reimbursements to pay for gender-affirming surgery.

Proponents argued that children are not mature enough to consent to surgeries, whereas opponents argued that decisions about medical treatment for children should be left between parents, families and doctors. Opponents also expressed concern that the text of the measure is vaguely written enough that it could apply to certain non-transgender surgeries too.

== Background ==
Currently, gender-affirming surgery is legal for minors in the state of Colorado, and health insurance providers are not permitted to deny or limit insurance coverage for gender-affirming surgery if a provider determines the treatment is "medically necessary". However, as of 2026, no hospital in Colorado offers gender-affirming surgeries to trans youth. Children's Hospital Colorado and UC Health have never offered surgeries despite offering other kinds of gender-affirming care to minors, and Denver Health stopped offering surgeries, along with all other kinds of gender-affirming care, to minors in early 2025 following "escalating actions" from the Trump administration targeting the care. As of August 2026, 25 U.S. states have enacted bans on gender-affirming surgery for minors via their state legislature. Proposition 135, would make Colorado the first state to do so via a ballot initiative. (Note: Two other U.S. states–Montana and Kansas–have passed legislation prohibiting gender-affirming surgery for minors, but courts have blocked the legislation from going into effect.)

Studies reviewing insurance data have found that gender-affirming surgeries are never performed on prepubescent children and are very rarely performed on adolescents. When surgeries are offered as an option to adolescents, it is only done with parental consent and "after years of therapy and consultation with the family" as well as several medical experts and also only offered in "extreme cases" of gender dysphoria as a "lifesaving last resort". For trans teens ages 15-17, the rate of gender-affirming surgeries was 2.1 per 100,000 transgender individuals with the vast majority being breast reductions as opposed to genital surgeries. Another study based on nationwide data found that all gender-affirming surgeries performed adolescents were all chest-related and none were genital surgeries.

A 2024 Harvard study found that cisgender minors received the surgeries that transgender minors receive for gender-affirming purposes at much higher rates than transgender minors, with 97% of breast reduction procedures performed on minors being for cisgender teenagers.

Proposition 135 is led by Erin Lee, whom Colorado Newsline described as a "prominent anti-LGBTQ activist" and her organization Protect Kids Colorado, a local advocacy group that claims to "oppose indoctrination concerning sexualization & gender transition." Lee described the organization as aiming to mobilize Coloradans and churches around “biblical and biological truth.” Lee had previously tried and failed to get several anti-LGBTQ measures on the ballot in Colorado during the 2024 election. In October 2026, Lee face criticism for saying inflicting violence on her opponents would be "gratifying" when discussing the ballot measure on a podcast with Colorado Republican Party activist, Joe Oltmann.

Proposition 135 would enact the Protect Children from Irreversible Sex Change Surgery Act, prohibiting gender-affirming surgery for Colorado residents under the age of 18. The measure would not prohibit male circumcision or "medically verifiable disorders of sex development" and "acquired physical or chemical abnormalities", although the ballot text does not clarify which particular procedures would fall under this exception. The text also does not say what constitutes an "acquired" condition and it is unclear whether surgeries related to sex for other conditions like Gynecomastia would be banned under the initiative.

Proposition 135 would also prohibit minors from using state and federal funds (including insurance coverage or Medicaid reimbursements) to pay for gender-affirming surgery which would remove the option for families to seek surgery out of state. The Colorado Department of Health Care Policy and Financing stated the state's Medicaid program has not covered a gender-affirming surgery in at least two years. There is no available on how many surgeries covered by private insurance.

On March 17, 2026, the Colorado secretary of state announced that Proposition 135 had qualified for the November ballot after submitting nearly 165,000 petition signatures.

In September 2026, the Positive Women's Network, filed a campaign finance complaint with the Colorado Secretary of State against proponents of the ballot measure for allegedly "failing to report payments to a petition circulation company as required by state law."

== Campaign ==
Opponents have expressed concern that the measure is overly broad, vague and lacks details on how it would be enforced. Concerns have also been raised that the measure would interfere with doctors and parents decisions to make medical decisions for their children and also that the measure's wording is written broadly and vaguely enough that it could restrict healthcare for people who are not trans such as breast reductions surgeries for cisgender teens with Gynecomastia as well as hormonal implants, treatment for certain reproductive cancers or other procedures that are done on minors which can alter their sex characteristics. Concerns have also been raised about the initiative's definition of a "healthcare professional" which does not mention surgeons, and instead includes "dentists, optometrists, chiropractors, podiatrists, pharmacists, physical therapists, psychologists and mental health therapists", which has led to concerns that treatments carried out by therapists, optometrists, and dentists could also be impacted by the ban.

Jack Teter, the vice president of government affairs at Planned Parenthood of the Rocky Mountains pointed out that the operative text of the measure, which is what gets put in the statue, does not mention "sex change" or "transgender surgeries" specifically, and instead bans surgeries that "alter biological sex characteristics in response to a minor's perception of their sex or gender." Teter expressed concern that that language does not "reflect a clearly defined medical standard" and text like "perception of THEIR gender" raises other questions that could impact different kids of medical situations.

Major medical organizations such as the Colorado Medical Society and Colorado Academy of Family Physicians, which have opposed the ballot measure, also expressed concern that the measure would "interfere with a medical provider's ability to use their own medical judgement" and called it a "broad, one-size-fits-all ban that goes far beyond what voters think they're being asked to approve."

The initiative has received the backing of various religious groups and the Catholic Church, which asked all 250 parishes in the state to help volunteer to support the initiative.

== Contents ==
The proposition will appear on the ballot as follows:

Shall there be a change to the Colorado Revised Statutes modifying existing law by prohibiting surgery on a minor for the purpose of altering the minor’s biological sex characteristics, and, in connection therewith, prohibiting any health-care professional or other person from knowingly performing, prescribing, administering, or providing any surgery to a minor for the purpose of altering the minor’s biological sex characteristics and prohibiting the use of state or federal funds, Medicaid reimbursement, or insurance coverage to pay for this type of surgery?

== Endorsements ==
=== Support ===
Yes

State legislators

- Kevin Lundberg, former SD-15 (2009–2019) (Republican)
- Brandi Bradley, House district-39 (2023–present) (Republican)
- Ken DeGraaf, House district-22 (2023–present) (Republican)

People

- Victor Marx, 2026 Colorado Gubernatorial Nominee (Republican)

Organizations

- Colorado Catholic Conference
- Focus on the Family
- Independence Institute
- Truth and Liberty Coalition
- Flatirons Community Church
- Colorado Archdiocese
- Andrew Wommack Ministries

Newspapers

- The Colorado Springs Gazette

=== Opposition ===
No

Statewide officials

- Jared Polis, Governor of Colorado (2019–present) (Democratic)
- Phil Weiser, Colorado Attorney General (2019–present) and 2026 Colorado Gubernatorial Nominee (Democratic)

Labor unions

- Colorado AFL-CIO
- Colorado Education Association
- CWA District 7
- SEIU Colorado

Organizations

- American Academy of Pediatrics
- American Civil Liberties Union
- Amnesty International USA
- COLOR Action Fund
- Colorado Academy of Family Physicians
- Colorado Child and Adolescent Psychiatric Society
- Colorado Medical Society
- American College of Obstetricians and Gynecologists Colorado Section
- Colorado Nurses Association
- Colorado Psychiatric Society
- Common Cause Colorado
- Healthier Colorado
- Indivisible Colorado
- Interfaith Alliance
- League of Women Voters of Colorado
- One Colorado
- Planned Parenthood of the Rocky Mountains
- The Center on Colfax
- Transgender Law Center
- ProgressNow

Political parties

- Colorado Democratic Party
- Colorado Working Families Party

Government bodies

- Associated Students of Colorado State University
- Boulder County Board of Commissioners

Newspapers and media

- Daily Camera
- The Denver Post
- The Durango Herald
- The Journal
- Sentinel Colorado
- Yellow Scene Magazine
- Pagosa Daily Post

== Aftermath and future ==
=== Response ===
Following the passage of Proposition 135, Democratic party officials and LGBTQ+ and human rights groups criticized the outcome and discussed possible legal challenges as well as the possibility of modifying or repealing the initiative via the state legislature.

Erin Lee, executive director of Protect Kids Colorado, described the passage of the organization's ballot initiatives as a demonstration that voters could act when elected officials were unwilling to address certain concerns.

Colorado Democratic Party chair Shad Murib said the party was "disappointed" in the outcome of the initiative and said, "This is an unwelcome intrusion of the government and politicians on people's personal and medical needs. ... Colorado Democrats will continue supporting these families and working to protect access to appropriate care. Tonight's result does not change our commitment to them."

One Colorado, a statewide LGBTQ advocacy organization, criticized the outcome and announced that it would continue its community organizing, deep canvassing, and public education efforts. Nadine Bridges, the organization's executive director said, "This outcome is painful, and it will have real consequences for young people and families across our state. To every transgender young person: You deserve to play, to access the healthcare you need, and to grow up in a state that supports you. You deserved those things yesterday, you deserve them today, and you will deserve them tomorrow. No election result can take away your dignity or belonging." Meanwhile, Jax Gonzalez, the organizations political director said, "Opponents of trans equality used fear and confusion to make scapegoats of trans young people and distract from problems families face every day, including skyrocketing costs of living and lack of access to affordable healthcare. These campaigns are meant to exhaust the people forced to defend their families and their futures. Our volunteers and storytellers helped neighbors understand the lives behind the campaign ads. That work matters, and it will continue."

Rocky Mountain Equality executive director Bruce Parker criticized the uncertainty surrounding their implementation and reaffirmed the organization's support for transgender Coloradans.

The Colorado chapter of Log Cabin Republicans praised the outcome.

Colorado Representative Melat Kiros, who was elected to the United States House of Representatives in 2026, released a statement saying "The passing of Prop 134 and 135 is not and has never been about protecting children. These violent anti trans ballot measures were a coordinated attack on human rights that will leave our children and our neighbors less safe and less free. Trans rights are human rights. As your congresswoman, I will stand and fight with the families and children, movement leaders, grassroots advocates, and Colorado legislators to do everything in our power to mitigate the harm these measures will cause, and to fight tirelessly to repeal them."

Scott Skinner-Thompson, a University of Colorado law professor whose research specializes in LGBTQ+ issues, said the passage of Proposition 135 reflects the state's position at a "unique cultural juncture", noting "Many parts of our state, due to demographic changes and growth in the Front Range, are extremely progressive and pro-LGBTQ. But we also have parts of our state that are deeply religious. It's no accident that Colorado keeps ending up in the Supreme Court, because we have a lot of pro-LGBTQ laws on the books, but we also have people who take religious liberty very seriously".

Planned Parenthood of the Rocky Mountains condemned the ruling, comparing Proposition 135 to Colorado's Amendment 2 in 1992 and saying "We will pursue every possible avenue to challenge the implementation of these measures to protect kids and their families from the dangerous privacy violations and far-reaching consequences they would create."

The Colorado Health Foundation released a statement saying "To all the transgender and nonbinary young people in Colorado: The Colorado Health Foundation has your back. At The Colorado Health Foundation, we are committed to advancing health equity for transgender and nonbinary Coloradans."

=== Legal challenge ===
Immediately following the results, opponents of Proposition 135 began discussing potential legal challenges to the measure. Z Williams, director of the Bread and Roses Legal Center and a contributor to the Kelly Loving Act, a Colorado law that expands civil rights and legal protections for transgender individuals, stated that advocates fully intend to challenge Proposition 135 in court and had begun preparing for the possibility of the measures passing about two months before Election Day. Williams added "We have some of the best policies in place in terms of anti-discrimination and healthcare protections that still exist, and they will remain existing. And also, we have a plan to fight".

The Families Not Politics coalition, which includes One Colorado, Rocky Mountain Equality, the Transgender Law Center and Inside Out Youth Services, Planned Parenthood of the Rocky Mountains and Cobalt, an abortion-rights organization, similarly pledged to "exhaust every option" to defend transgender young people's rights.

Scott Skinner-Thompson, a University of Colorado law professor said he expects families challenging the law to allege state constitutional violations, alleging that the new laws infringe on their right to make medical decisions or their right to free expression. He noted that Colorado's Amendment 2 which passed in 1992, faced similar legal challenges and was ultimately overturned by courts in 1996, saying "It's not as if these changes will necessarily last forever. For the LGBTQ rights movement, it's a setback. There are many trans youth who woke up this morning and felt the sting of what looks like the result. But the queer community is resilient, and Colorado has been here before.”

Protect Kids Colorado, meanwhile, stated that its legal team was monitoring potential challenges and was prepared to defend the propositions through available legal avenues.

=== Potential modifications or repeal ===
Following the election, Governor-elect Phil Weiser expressed willingness to consider legislative changes to Propositions 135, stating that his administration would examine what adjustments were necessary and appropriate. Protect Kids Colorado accused Weiser of trying to "circumvent democracy" by disguising an effort to rewrite the measure as a "necessary administrative fix."

Unlike constitutional amendments, Proposition 135 would only change Colorado statutes, meaning the state legislature can later revise or repeal it with just a simple majority vote. Because of this, transgender advocates immediately began calling for lawmakers to repeal the measure, with Williams saying "This is not over. This is just the beginning." On November 7, 2026, hundreds of opponents of the measure held a rally at the Colorado State Capital demanding the legislature take action to repeal the measure.

State Representative Lorena Garcia, said lawmakers would work with trans rights groups to find a solution and said "nothing is off the table". She said what they ultimately decide to do will depend on "what is possible and what the coalition of organizations working on behalf of transgender people wants to see happen".

State Representative Jennifer Bacon, said she is working with opponents of the ballot measures to determine the next legislative next steps.

State Senate President James Coleman, said he anticipates having conversations with the Senate Democratic caucus about the measure and what to do about it, saying "I don't think it's going to be a light decision".

Protect Kids Colorado responded by urging lawmakers to resist the pressure to repeal the measure and warned lawmakers that if they attempt to repeal or modify the initiative at all, they will face "political accountability".

== Analysis ==
Several news outlets, advocates and political experts noted prior to the initiative passing that it could influence political trends throughout the nation as it's passage would likely lead to a slew of anti-trans ballot initiatives showing up in other states.

Several news outlets and experts noted that conservative advocacy groups had largely maxxed out what anti-trans policies they can pass through state legislatures in Republican-controlled states, and are increasingly turning their efforts to Democrat-controlled states. However, the legislatures in Democrat-controlled states have refused to pass any of the anti-trans legislation being enacted in Republican-controlled states, leading to conservative advocacy groups to turn to the ballot initiative process as an attempt to circumvent the legislature.

Several news outlets, advocates and political experts compared the anti-trans ballot measures in 2026 to the push to ban or restrict gay rights via over three dozen ballot initiatives in the 1990s and early 2000s, particularly the wave of anti-gay marriage ballot measures of 2004 and in 2008 with California's Proposition 8. Advocates and news outlets also compared the passage of Proposition 135 with the passage of Colorado Amendment 2 in 1992, noting that both measures were "backed by religious and conservative organizations marketing themselves as pro-family values while spreading demonizing rhetoric about the LGBTQ+ community."

Prior to the 2026 midterms election, Republicans expressed hope that such measures could increase voter enthusiasm and turnout among Republican voters much like how religious groups had hoped the ballot measures banning gay marriage would increase enthusiasm and voter turnout for George W. Bush in 2004. Although, Reid Wilson, the founder of Pluribus News, expressed skepticism that this strategy would work, noting that despite Bush winning the 2004 presidential election, a lot of the academic research and Bush's own campaign advisers said he would have still won without those measures. Following the 2026 midterm elections, this strategy was ultimately shown to be unsuccessful as Democrats still won the election in a landslide despite the passage of Proposition 135.

In October 2026, the presidents, CEOs and executive directors for various LGBTQ+ rights groups including Transgender Law Center, GLAAD, Lambda Legal, Advocates for Trans Equality and the Human Rights Campaign authored a joint article raising alarm that ballot initiatives like Initiative 638 and Missouri's Amendment 3 would "serve as testing grounds for the 2028 Presidential election", noting that if the measures passed, political operatives would stress-test field operations, construct voter databases, analyze which misinformation about LGBTQ people can flip a swing district and perfect fear-based messaging on it. The groups warned that such measures passing in 2026 could lead to the 2028 election cycle being "flooded with divisive proposals to ban inclusive books, erase LGBTQ families from classrooms, and roll back everything from enshrined reproductive freedom to employment nondiscrimination."

== See also ==
- 2026 United States ballot measures
- 2026 Washington Initiative 638
- 2026 Washington Initiative 001
- List of Colorado ballot measures
- 2026 Missouri Amendment 3
- 2008 California Proposition 8
- 1992 Colorado Amendment 2
