= Millionaires tax (Washington state) =

2026 Washington state income tax on high earners

The millionaires tax (officially Senate Bill 6346, also known as the millionaire tax, the millionaire's tax, and the millionaires' tax) is a Washington state law enacted by the Washington State Legislature in March 2026 and subsequently signed into law. It imposes a 9.9-percent tax on household income with a standard deduction of $1 million per year, effective January 1, 2028, with first returns and payments due in 2029. The bill cleared both chambers of the Legislature on March 12, 2026, and was sent to Governor Bob Ferguson for signature. Ferguson, who publicly endorsed the measure, indicated his intention to sign it.

Ferguson signed the bill into law on March 30, 2026. Initiative 645 appeared on the November 3, 2026, ballot in an effort to repeal the millionaires tax. The initiative was defeated by Washington voters.

== Background ==
In December 2025, Governor Bob Ferguson announced his support for a high-income tax, emphasizing that any revenue should be directed toward working families and small business relief.

== Provisions ==
SB 6346 imposes a flat 9.9% tax on Washington taxable income exceeding $1 million per household. A married couple or domestic partnership shares a single $1 million standard deduction. The tax starts from federal adjusted gross income and is adjusted for various factors, including capital gains and charitable deductions. The $1 million standard deduction is indexed for inflation beginning in 2030.

The tax applies to Washington residents, part-year residents, and nonresidents who derive Washington-source income, including wages for services performed in Washington, income from a Washington business or pass-through entity, and rents or gains from Washington real or tangible personal property.

Proponents estimated the tax would generate $3.5 billion or more per year once collections begin in 2029. SB 6346 directs the revenue to public defense, the state's Working Families Tax Credit, small business tax relief, and sales tax exemptions.

== Reactions ==
=== Support ===
Senate Majority Leader Jamie Pedersen said of the bill's passage, "For Washington's 1.1 million school kids, people struggling to afford health care, and small businesses looking for help, that help is on the way."

Victoria Hattersley, of Patriotic Millionaires, wrote in support of the bill in Business Insider in March 2026.

Dylan Grundman O'Neill and Marco Guzman of the Institute on Taxation and Economic Policy wrote in favor of the bill, calling it an "important step toward making the state's tax system more equitable." Following the bill's passage into law, the ITEP claiming that the reform would "undoubtedly make Washington's tax system fairer."

Union groups like the Washington State Labor Council, SEIU 775, and the Washington Education Association hosted a rally in support of the bill at the state Capitol on February 10, 2026.

After being signed into law, travel writer Rick Steves praised the new tax, calling it "common sense".

=== Opposition ===
Starbucks founder Howard Schultz, after the bill was passed, announced that he was moving to Florida.

Former state Attorney General Rob McKenna said that Washington State Republicans would challenge the bill in court.

The editorial board of The Washington Post called the measure "folly", noting, "Higher revenue doesn't automatically translate to better services or outcomes.... Don't expect utopia simply because the state is now punishing high-earning residents."

Nathan Goldman of North Carolina State University writing for Forbes raised the possibility that "As high-income athletes face significantly higher tax liabilities, they may be less likely to choose to play for a team based in the state of Washington, potentially hindering the states' sports teams' performances." John Schneider, general manager of the Seattle Seahawks, said of the bill's passage, "it's going to sting from a recruiting standpoint."

== See also ==
- Capital gains tax in Washington (state)
- Taxation in Washington (state)
