= Fair Work Center =

American labor rights group

- Formation: 2016; 10 years ago
- Founder: David Rolf
- Headquarters: Seattle, Washington
- Executive Director: Danielle Alvarado
- Website: https://www.fairworkcenter.org/

Fair Work Center (FWC) is a Seattle-based non-profit group formed in 2016. It focuses on improving working conditions and advocating for worker’s rights. In addition to education and advocacy, the group also provides legal aid for work-related matters.

== History ==
The Fair Work Center was originally underwritten by the Service Employees International Union (SEIU) Local 775. At the time, it brought together eleven community organizations. As of 2018, David Rolf was president of both the FWC and SEIU 775.

On July 1, 2015, the Fair Work Center launched a legal clinic, in partnership with Seattle University and the University of Washington School of Law. In 2018, Fair Work Center merged with Working Washington, another Seattle-based worker’s rights organization.

The group has advocated for workers rights in many instances. In January 2025, Fair Work Center, along with other advocacy groups, held a lobbying day in Olympia to bring awareness and push for a new workers “bill of rights” in Washington. The bill, Senate Bill 5023, was introduced by Senator Rebecca Saldaña, D-Seattle. It was passed in March 2025 and protects domestic workers, or those who work in private homes, such as nannies, gardeners, and house cleaners.

In addition to their own advocacy work for domestic workers, the Fair Work Center also works with the Nanny Collective, a Seattle-based group that advocates for nannies and au pairs.

Fair Work Center organizes and hosts different events to educate and bring awareness on worker's rights in addition to taking steps to create change.

== Legal work ==
In 2023, a group of caregivers who worked in homes operated by AssureCare sued the company, arguing their exemption for workers required to live on-site violated their constitutional right to equal protection. The group, who a King County Superior Court judge ruled in favor of in 2024, is represented by Fair Work Center attorney Jeremiah Miller.

== Leadership ==
David Rolf is the founder and president of the Fair Work Center. Danielle Alvarado has served as executive director since 2021. Hannah Sabio-Howell works as the communications director for the center.
