= Inlaws & Outlaws =

- Directed by: Drew Emery
- Produced by: Larry Schlessinger, Lisa Halpern, Drew Emery
- Production company: True Stories Project
- Release dates: May 2005 (original version); July 2007 (theatrical premiere)
- Country: United States
- Language: English

Inlaws & Outlaws is a documentary by filmmaker and oral historian Drew Emery that weaves together the true stories of couples and singles—both gay and straight—to create a collective narrative of stories of love, loss and belonging. The film was produced by Larry Schlessinger, Lisa Halpern, and Emery for the True Stories Project, Emery's production company.

The original version of the film premiered at the Seattle International Film Festival in May 2005. After a successful run in the festival circuit, the film was edited further and received its theatrical premiere in July 2007 at the Seattle Cinerama.

== Synopsis ==
From the official website:

What do you get when you fall in love? Inlaws & Outlaws cleverly weaves together the true stories of couples and singles— both gay and straight — and all into a collective narrative that is as hilarious as it is heartbreaking.

At the top of the film, you meet real people one on one. You don’t know who’s gay or straight or who’s with whom. As their stories unfold and stereotypes fall by the wayside, you won’t care because you’ll be rooting for everybody. With candor, good humor, great music and real heart, Inlaws & Outlaws gets past all the rhetoric to embrace what we have in common: We love.

== Distribution ==
Since its theatrical premiere, Inlaws & Outlaws has been distributed through the True Stories Project's Hearts + Minds Campaign a grassroots distribution mechanism where the film is presented largely by community activists, LGBT and marriage equality organizations, colleges, universities and congregations. As of November 2010, over 400 community screenings of Inlaws & Outlaws have been presented in the United States, over half of them in congregations.

== Awards and recognition ==
Inlaws & Outlaws won the Grand Jury Prize at the 2006 deadCENTER Film Festival in Oklahoma City. It has appeared in over 25 film festivals and was chosen Best of Fest by audiences at the Palm Springs International Film Festival and Best Local Film at the Seattle Lesbian & Gay Film Festival. Director Drew Emery was chosen as a runner up for Best Director in the Seattle International Film Festival's Golden Space Needle Awards. In 2007, the Greater Seattle Business Association, the nation's largest LGBT chamber of commerce, honored Emery and the film with a Special Recognition Award for Social Change Through the Arts.
