= David Rolf =

American labor leader

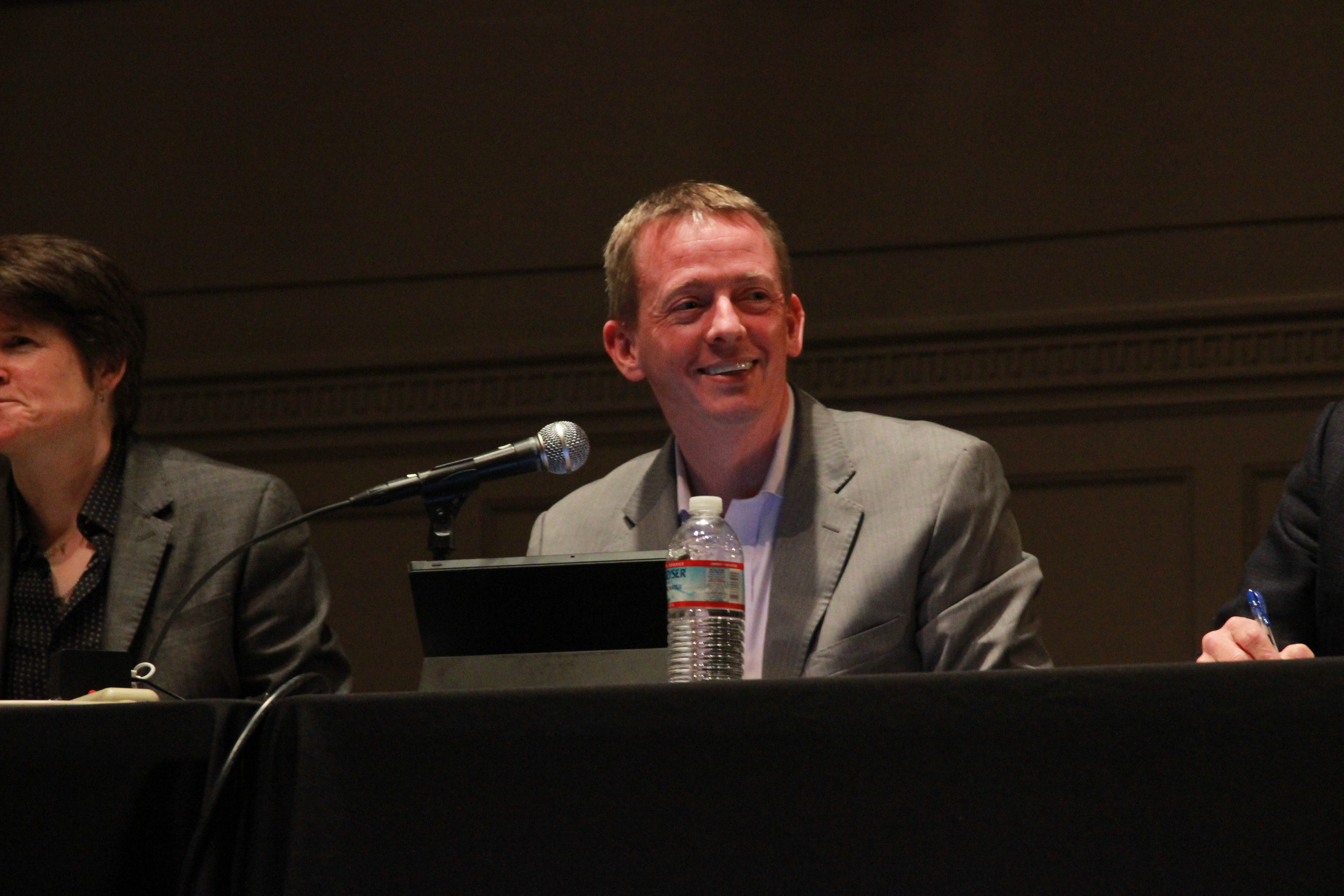
- Born: 1969 (age 56–57)
- Education: Bard College (BA)
- Employer: Service Employees International Union
- Website: davidmrolf.com/about

David Rolf (born 1969) is an American labor leader, writer, and speaker. He was the Founding President of Seattle-based Local 775 of the Service Employees International Union (SEIU), which represents health care workers, and formerly served as international vice president of SEIU. He is the author of The Fight for Fifteen: The Right Wage for a Working America (New Press, 2016) about the movement by low-wage workers to earn a higher minimum wage, and A Roadmap to Rebuilding Worker Power (The Century Foundation, 2018). Rolf was a founder of the Fair Work Center in Seattle, Working Washington, The Workers Lab in Oakland, and the SEIU 775 Benefits Group.

Rolf stepped down as president of SEIU 775 on September 30, 2018, after publishing a blog post on Medium about the importance of term limits for union officers as a way to encourage innovation in the labor movement.

Rolf has been credited for helping to pass the November 2013 ballot measure in SeaTac, Washington known as Proposition 1, which set a $15-per-hour minimum wage for airport and hotel workers. He has also been credited for helping to lead the campaign for a $15-per-hour minimum wage. Following Ed Murray's successful bid for Mayor of Seattle, Rolf served as co-chair of the mayor's Income Inequality Advisory Committee.

Rolf advocates for innovation within the labor union movement, including calling for labor to use its existing resources to reinvent itself by developing organizations that "have economic power to improve lives," that can "scale" to ultimately help millions of workers and that are financially sustainable so they can survive without relying on foundation grants. Rolf has also recently supported new responses to the rise of contingent and on-demand work, including portable benefits and a basic income.

== Early life and education ==
Rolf was born in 1969 and grew up in Cincinnati. His father, a lawyer, and mother, a unionized teacher with a blue-collar background, held liberal values and taught him to abide by the Golden Rule. His father had pledged to a mostly black fraternity in the early 1960s in support of the civil rights movement, and his mother took him to "U.S. Out of Central America" meetings at her Unitarian church.

He was also influenced by other family members. Rolf's maternal grandfather, described as "hardscrabble", worked at a General Motors plant and was a member of United Automobile Workers (UAW) who picketed on several occasions. He observed the evolution of his paternal grandfather's career, who worked a third-shift job at a Procter & Gamble soap factory in order to pay for law school, eventually becoming a lawyer and local politician. During his formative years, Rolf witnessed inequality and limited economic mobility, and sought to reverse injustice.

Rolf attended Bard College in New York, where his political and social ideologies were further developed. He found he agreed with content published by The Nation, a left-leaning publication that had been introduced to him by a college girlfriend. Rolf was involved in many causes during his time at college, including apartheid, HIV/AIDS, and others that emerged during the presidency of Ronald Reagan.

During his time at Bard College, Rolf interned at a local chapter of SEIU. He later accepted an entry-level position as an organizer for the Atlanta chapter. In 1998, he worked opposite the Los Angeles County Board of Supervisors to organize home care workers. The negotiations resulted in the Board establishing a public authority that cleared the way for 74,000 workers to join SEIU Local 434-B.

== Career ==
=== Early work ===
While attending college, Rolf interned at a local chapter of Service Employees International Union (SEIU), a labor union focused on organizing workers in three sectors: health care, including hospital, home care and nursing home workers; local and state government employees; and property services, including janitors, security officers and food service workers. Rolf helped an SEIU local to organize campus janitors at Bard. After college, he began doing union organizing in Georgia, accepting an entry-level position as an organizer for the Atlanta chapter of SEIU. Though he was initially uncertain about what he wanted to do career-wise, Rolf enjoyed working as an organizer and quickly gained the attention of SEIU leaders.

=== Los Angeles ===
Beginning in 1995 in his role as "deputy general manager" for Local 434-B, Rolf partnered with the Los Angeles County Board of Supervisors in an attempt to organize home care workers. He led the home care campaign for the last four years of the 12-year effort, emphasizing direct outreach to educate home care workers on issues important to working people, mobilize them to vote, and encourage them to walk precincts talking with other voters.

To implement these strategies, Rolf led the union's organizing staff into communities they hadn't worked in before, and hired organizers that reflected those areas demographically. A neighborhood-based group meeting structure was developed for home care workers to share stories, identify common challenges, and activate around the need for collective action. Rolf noted that through these meetings, home care workers "found out for the first time that they weren't alone." The local also worked closely with other groups, such as the disability community, around shared interests in a form of coalition-based social unionism. He raised the new local's credibility by taking a lead role on passing Proposition 210, a 1996 California State initiative that raised the minimum wage to $5.75 per hour beginning March 1, 1998. The local collected more signatures than any other group.

In 1999, Rolf guided the home care campaign to success, as the L.A. Board of Supervisors established a public authority for home care workers who were paid by the state. In short order, 74,000 Los Angeles County home-care workers joined the public authority, making the L.A. home care victory the largest union drive since autoworkers at Michigan's Ford River Rouge Complex joined the United Auto Workers 70 years earlier. Referring to the vote to unionize county workers, Rolf said it was "Simply one for the history books".

=== SEIU 775 ===
Rolf was the founding president of the Seattle-based Local 775 of SEIU, a union of 43,000 members. Established in 2001, the chapter has become one of the largest political voices and one of the most powerful unions in Washington. Before SEIU's formation, home-care workers earned "barely more" than minimum wage and were not able to unionize. After lawmakers denied workers collective bargaining rights, SEIU invested $1 million on Initiative 775, which was approved by 63% of the voters in 2001.

In 2004, SEIU was successful in securing a contract between Washington State and 26,000 health care workers. The House and Senate approved the contract unanimously, which raised wages from $7.18 to $8.93 and also included health insurance benefits and workers' compensation for the first time.

SEIU disaffiliated with the AFL–CIO in 2005. Referring to the need for unions to evolve in order to remain relevant, and echoing the opinion of then SEIU president Andy Stern, Rolf told The Seattle Times: "If you're told that a company had the same product line and corporate structure in 2005 as it had in 1955, you could probably conclude that the company is failing."

Throughout the early years of SEIU 775 and into the 2006 state elections, Rolf gained attention for threatening to take on established Democrats and endorsing Republicans, at one point saying: "For too long the labor movement has been considered the lap dog of one party rather than the watchdog for both parties. The time has passed where we can allow one party to write us off and the other to take us for granted." Furthermore, he told The Seattle Times in 2006 that members are not concerned with affiliating themselves with any political party.

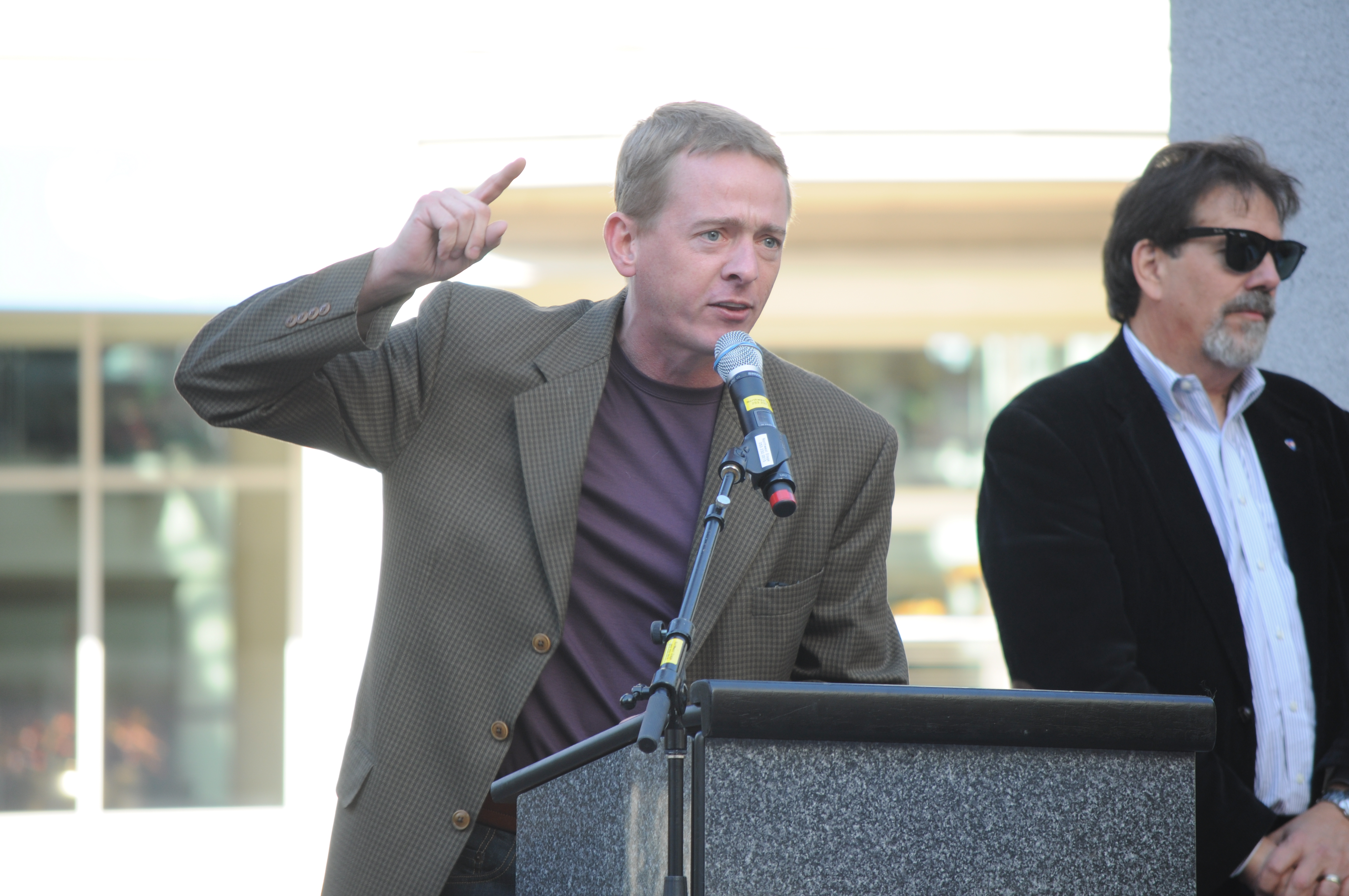
Rolf speaking at an Occupy Seattle rally in October 2011

In 2008, SEIU 775 sued Governor Chris Gregoire over her budget, claiming it failed to fund wage increases for state home-care workers. An arbitrator had ordered a 47-cents-per-hour wage increase over two years, following failed contract negotiations. The Washington Federation of State Employees had also sued Gregoire, alleging breach of contract for workers. The union clashed with Gregoire again in 2010 when she canceled several collective bargaining agreements and requested that state workers return to negotiations. Rolf claimed that health workers in the state would lose $100 million in overtime and benefits that had been ordered by an arbitrator.

Washington State voters approved I-1029 in 2008, which required additional training and certification requirements for home care workers. At that time, Rolf became the founder and chair of the SEIU Healthcare Training Partnership, a 501(c)(3) school that offers education programs leading to Certified Home Care Aide credentials as well as more advanced apprenticeship programs. The school, which enrolls 40,000 students annually, is the first and largest institution for developing long-term home care workers in the United States.^{[44]} The school was created and sponsored by a labor-management partnership with input from healthcare purchasers and systems, home care providers, SEIU, and the State of Washington. In 2014, the Training Partnership's program was recognized by President Barack Obama and Vice President Joe Biden as part of the White House's initiative to invest in job training.

In October 2011, SEIU formally endorsed the Occupy movement and Rolf began speaking at Occupy Seattle rallies. In 2012, Rolf was appointed to then Governor-elect Jay Inslee's transition team, helping him to draft a legislative agenda during his time in office. Rolf also serves as international vice president of SEIU.

=== $15-per-hour minimum wage ===
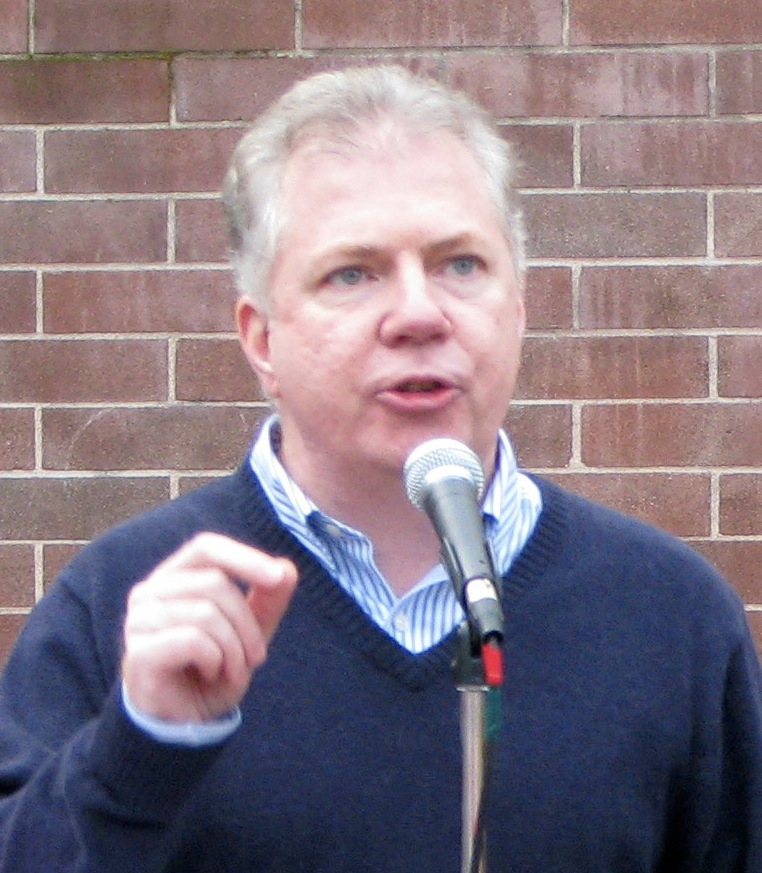
Ed Murray in 2008. Rolf served on Murray's transition team following his successful bid for Mayor of Seattle in 2013, and was named co-chair of his Income Inequality Advisory Committee.

Rolf has been involved in several efforts to increase the minimum wage to $15. In June 2013, Rolf assisted Nick Hanauer in writing an op-ed for Bloomberg Businessweek. The pair successfully advocated to the Democracy Alliance the importance of making a minimum wage increase a central position. Rolf has been credited for helping to pass the November 2013 ballot measure in SeaTac, Washington, known as Proposition 1, which set a $15-per-hour minimum wage for airport and hotel workers. He has also been credited for making a $15-per-hour minimum wage part of Ed Murray's agenda.

Rolf served on Murray's transition team following his successful bid for Mayor of Seattle in 2013, and was named co-chair of the 23-person Income Inequality Advisory Committee, which addresses minimum wage and other social issues. In late December 2013, Murray announced plans to increase the minimum wage to $15 per hour, which he had pledged to do during his election campaign, earning him an endorsement from Local 775 of SEIU. Simultaneously, Rolf was working alongside newly elected Seattle City Council member Kshama Sawant, who had also advocated for a $15-per-hour minimum wage, to bring the issue into the mainstream and attract support for the policy from both Seattle Mayors Michael McGinn and Murray. In order to bring their agendas to fruition, both politicians sought to earn the support of Rolf and Local 775 of SEIU.

In 2016, Rolf published The Fight for Fifteen: The Right Wage for a Working America, which provides an overview of the $15-per-hour minimum wage debate.

=== Building the next American labor movement ===
Rolf is critical of American labor leaders' reliance on the "now-failed American system of enterprise-based exclusive representation that Congress assigned to us in 1935." He has written extensively about the need for unions to innovate in order to maintain relevance in the 21st Century, including co-authoring an op-ed with Eli Lehrer of the libertarian R Street Institute in the wake of the Supreme Court's ruling in Janus v. AFSCME.

In 2018, the Century Foundation published Rolf's e-book, A Roadmap to Rebuilding Worker Power. In it, Rolf outlines strategies to build worker organizations that have power, scale, and sustainability, which he argues are critical for building a labor movement with lasting impact.

Rolf is working with entrepreneur and venture capitalist Nick Hanauer on an unnamed project to rebuild the middle class in the United States.

=== Portable benefits and universal basic income ===
Rolf has advocated for testing of alternative ways to help modern American workers.

Hanauer and Rolf support a "portable benefits" system in which workers are assigned "individual security accounts" into which employers contribute "safety-net fees" relative to the number of hours an employee works. These funds could then be used to pay for a worker's safety net. In 2015, the duo discussed portable benefits in an article they co-authored called "Shared Security, Shared Growth", which was published by Democracy. In November 2015, Rolf was one of nearly forty signatories of a letter on portable benefits published by Medium. Rolf was selected as a 2016 Future for Good fellow at the Institute for the Future, and has been a featured speaker there on the topic of portable benefits. In January 2018, Rolf co-authored an open letter with Hanauer and Uber CEO Dara Khosrowshahi urging business, labor, and government leaders to commit to developing a flexible, proportional, and universal system of worker benefits.

In a December 2016 post on Medium, Rolf announced that he was a founding signatory to the Economic Security Project, a new group that intends to research a basic income system. In the Medium post, Rolf wrote that "the labor movement’s job has always been to ensure that workers get a fair slice of the economic pie" and that "a basic income is an end-run around the failings of modern economies to provide a decent life for their citizens."

=== Work for other organizations ===
Rolf serves as chairman of Carina, the SEIU 775 Secure Retirement Trust, the Fair Work Center, and Working Washington. He is on the advisory boards of the Aspen Institute's Future of Work Initiative and the MIT Work of the Future project, and is part of the Clean Slate Project at Harvard Law School, which aims to build a policy agenda to reconstruct labor law. He advises a number of organizations on matters relating to labor and economic justice.

Rolf helped found the Fair Work Center, Working Washington, and the Workers Lab. The Fair Work Center is a Seattle-based hub that assists in enforcing labor law and helps workers understand and exercise their legal rights. Working Washington is a Seattle-based fast-food workers nonprofit advocacy group composed of civil rights and immigrant activists, labor advocates, neighborhood associations, and religions leaders. Working Washington, an initiative of SEIU and an affiliated organization of the AFL-CIO, advocates for benefits and fair wages, as well as the right to establish unions. The Workers Lab is the first accelerator and business incubator offering "new models of worker voice".

== Political positions and public image ==
Having recognized the declining influence of unions in the United States, Rolf now advocates for change within the labor movement. In 2012, he wrote an article for The American Prospect, in which he said:

We need new strategies that are responsive to a changed work environment and our information and service economy. But too many unions continue to pursue the same strategies, under the same laws that we've followed for the past 80 years. It's time to seed an era of innovation and organizing that comports with our changing economy and can advocate powerfully on behalf of a 21st-century workforce... America's unions and our allies must have the courage to acknowledge that the crisis we face cannot be met with old models and old tools. We must imagine an alternative future, even if we do not yet know what form it will take. We must embrace risk and failure as necessary elements of a long-term strategy for success.

Rolf echoed similar sentiments in a 2013 article for Democracy, writing: "If we invest time, energy, and capital into rigorous research, development, testing, and scaling up of new strategies and organizations that put workers' interests at the heart of our democracy, we can rebuild the American Dream. Now is a time for creativity and courage, risk and experimentation." In 2013, The Seattle Times wrote that Rolf's mission is to persuade the more traditional leaders within the movement "to accept that innovation is your new religion". He advocates for the use of social networking services by unions in order to engage young people, and believes that, like corporations, unions must invest in development, entrepreneurship and research in order to be successful in their efforts. Rolf believes "a completely new and disruptive force" is necessary to help the middle class, which will require "bold moral and economic choices". He criticizes corporations that outsource or subcontract workers on a low-wage, part-time or temporary basis in order to avoid paying for the benefits required for full-time employees. Rolf has expressed concern about increased student loan debt, cost of housing increases that are greater than family income increases, and payroll tax increases during a time of simultaneous corporate tax decreases, and he is critical of trickle-down economics. He advocates for a $15-per-hour minimum wage to help address these issues. Rolf believes that minimum wage increases help local and small businesses.

Rolf has been described as "not your father's union leader", with the appearance of a "gung-ho, young corporate executive". According to The Seattle Times, he succeeded in growing SEIU 775 with a "tell it like it is" personality, using the union's influence to push legislation and bargaining with the Washington State Legislature on issues related to worker's compensation and benefits. He is also known for challenging "insufficiently union-friendly" politicians, including "generally sympathetic Democrats", and for working with academics, business leaders, and "people who've built other successful organizations".

== Works ==
- Rolf, David (April 9, 2002). "Tight-fisted Legislature squeezes the needy". The Seattle Times.
- Rolf, David (August 23, 2005). "Letters to the editor: Union vow". The Seattle Times.
- Rolf, David (May 20, 2011). "Don't delay implementation of I-1029's home-care worker training requirements". The Seattle Times.
- Rolf, David (December 12, 2012). "Alternative Futures for Labor". The American Prospect. Washington, D.C.: The American Prospect, Inc.
- Rolf, David (Summer 2013). "Labor: Building a New Future". Democracy (29). Washington, D.C.
- Rolf, David; Hanauer, Nick (August 10, 2013). "Guest: Seattle's on the vanguard of movement to raise minimum wage". The Seattle Times.
- Rolf, David (June 18, 2014). "What if We Treated Labor Like a Startup?". The Nation.
- Rolf, David (July–August 2014). "Thinking Bigger in Local Minimum Wage Campaigns: The Fight for $15 in Seattle". Aspen Journal of Ideas.
- Hanauer, Nick; Rolf, David (Summer 2015). "Shared Security, Shared Growth". Democracy (37).
- Rolf, David (2016). The Fight for Fifteen: The Right Wage for a Working America. The New Press. ISBN 978-1-62097-113-0.
- Rolf, David (April 18, 2016). "Toward a 21st-Century Labor Movement". American Prospect.
- Rolf, David (June 16, 2016). "Portable Benefits in the 21st Century". The Aspen Institute.
- Rolf, David (September 5, 2016). "The Labor Movement As We Know It Is Dying. Here's How It Can Survive". PBS.
- Rolf, David (November 16, 2016). "Guest Post: Trump, Sunk Cost Fallacies, and the Next Labor Movement". On Labor.
- Rolf, David (December 12, 2016). "Why would a Labor Leader Support a Universal Basic Income?". Medium.
- Hanauer, Nick; Rolf, David (February 23, 2017). "Portable Benefits for an Insecure Workforce". American Prospect.
- Rolf, David; Watterson, Corrie (May 15, 2017). "Basic Income in a Just Society". Boston Review.
- Lehrer, Eli; Rolf, David (July 3, 2018). "A conservative and a liberal agree: Unions must change after Supreme Court blow on Janus". USA Today.
- Foster, Natalie; Rolf, David (September 27, 2018). "A fund for NYC drivers models how benefits could work in the gig economy". Quartz.
- Rolf, David (2018). A Roadmap to Rebuilding Worker Power. The Century Foundation.
