= 2026 Washington Initiative 645 =

- November 3, 2026
- Repeal Tax on Household Income Over $1 Million and Prohibit State and Local Taxes on Income Initiative
- Reporting: 99% as of November 18, 8:47 PM PST
- Outcome: Rejected

Results
Choice	Votes	%
Yes	1,344,080	41.99%
No	1,856,711	58.01%
County results
Yes
60–70%
50–60%
No
70–80%
60–70%
50–60%
- Source: NBC News

Initiative 645, the Repeal Tax on Household Income Over $1 Million and Prohibit State and Local Taxes on Income Initiative, is a direct initiated state statute that will appear on the November 3, 2026, ballot in the U.S. state of Washington. If approved by voters, the initiative would repeal the millionaires tax, a 9.9% tax on household income exceeding $1 million per year that was approved by the Washington state legislature in March 2026.

== Background ==
Initiative 645 was a Washington state ballot measure in the November 3, 2026 election. Its main goal was to repeal the new 9.9% tax on people making more than $1 million a year. It also sought to prevent state and local governments from creating other individual income taxes. Washington has traditionally collected money through sales taxes, property taxes, and business taxes instead of a general income tax. This has been part of the state's tax system for many years.In 2026, lawmakers passed Senate Bill 6346, which created a 9.9% tax on income over $1 million. Governor Bob Ferguson signed the law on March 30, 2026. The tax was expected to begin in 2028, with payments starting in 2029.

Washington's millionaires tax imposes a flat 9.9% tax on taxable income exceeding $1 million per household, with married couple or domestic partnerships sharing a single $1 million standard deduction. The tax starts from federal adjusted gross income and is adjusted for various factors, including capital gains and charitable deductions. The $1 million standard deduction is indexed for inflation beginning in 2030.

The tax applies to Washington residents, part-year residents, and nonresidents who derive Washington-source income, including wages for services performed in Washington, income from a Washington business or pass-through entity, and rents or gains from Washington real or tangible personal property. Before the millionaires tax was passed, proponents estimated the tax would generate $3.5 billion or more per year once collections begin in 2029. The tax directs the revenue to public defense, the state's Working Families Tax Credit, small business tax relief, and sales tax exemptions.

=== Impact ===
If the initiative is approved by voters, the millionaires tax would be repealed and future taxes on income would be prohibited. The initiative would also define income as "any gain or benefit measured in money derived from an individual's capital, labor, property, or other source."

Supporters believed removing the tax would help keep wealthy residents, investors, and businesses in Washington. They worried that higher taxes could encourage people to move to states with lower taxes. Opponents believed the tax would bring in billions of dollars that could help pay for important state programs. They argued that removing it could make it harder for Washington to support public services.

Education and health care were two important issues during the debate. Opponents of Initiative 645 believed keeping the millionaire's tax would provide more money for public schools, colleges, health care, and childcare. They worried that removing the tax could make it harder to fund these programs. Supporters disagreed and believed Washington should find other ways to pay for public services without creating a new income tax.

== Endorsements ==
Yes

U.S. representatives

- Jamie Herrera Beutler, former WA-03 (2011–2023) (Republican)

Political parties

- Washington State Republican Party

Organizations

- Americans for Tax Reform
- National Federation of Independent Business
No

Statewide officials

- Bob Ferguson, governor of Washington (2025–present) (Democratic)

Labor unions

- United Auto Workers

Organizations

- League of Women Voters of Washington
- Northwest Progressive Institute
- Sierra Club Washington State
- Washington State PTA

Newspapers

- The Seattle Times

== Polling ==
Poll source	Date(s) administered	Sample size (Note: Key: A – all adults RV – registered voters LV – likely voters V – unclear)	Margin of error	Yes	No	Undecided
Let's Go Washington	–	–	–	57%	24%	22%

After Initiative 645 failed, Washington kept its new 9.9% tax on income above $1 million. The tax was still scheduled to begin in 2028, with the first payments expected in 2029.

== See also ==
- 2026 California Proposition 40
- 2026 Washington Initiative 001
- 2026 Washington Initiative 638
