= Special rights =

Political rights given to some groups

"Special rights" is a term originally used by conservatives and libertarians to refer to laws granting rights to one or more groups that are not extended to other groups. Ideas of special rights are controversial, as they clash with the principle of equality before the law. The term has also been used to refer to policies aimed at achieving simple equality, such as LGBT rights and other civil rights movements.

== Definition and usage ==
Potential examples of special rights include affirmative action policies or hate crime legislation with regard to ethnic, religious or sexual minorities or state recognition of marriage as a group with different taxation from those who are not married. The concept of special rights is closely aligned with notions of group rights and identity politics.

Minority rights advocacy groups often contend that such protections confer no special rights, and describe these laws instead as protecting equal rights, due to past conditions or legal privileges for specific groups.

More recently, social conservatives have used the term to more narrowly refer to measures that extend existing rights for heterosexual couples to gays and lesbians, such as in the case of same sex marriage, or that include sexual orientation as a civil rights minority group. In campaigns for ballot initiatives in the United States that would limit civil rights for homosexuals, such as 1992 Colorado Amendment 2 and 1992 Oregon Ballot Measure 9, the idea of "special rights" was used to persuade voters that gays and lesbians were seeking privileges for a chosen way of life at odds with societal norms, rather than protection from discrimination.

== Legal arguments ==
The basis behind the argument of the term is based on whether it should be considered just and legal for a law to treat various parties unequally. For example, in the US Constitution the prohibition on bills of attainder require that laws do not single out a single person or group of persons for specific treatment.

Another example is the Equal Protection Clause in the Fourteenth Amendment. Both sides argue that the other side is or has traditionally been singled out and so the law is either needed or unnecessary.

In some cases, such as those with social implications, the universal definition of rights also often conflict with other, often more regional or local, laws that require certain public standards or behavior based on cultural norms.

== Libertarian perspective ==
In The Encyclopedia of Libertarianism, Eric Mack states:

A too-ready acceptance of alleged rights leads to an oppressive list of enforceable obligations. As the list of others' rights grows, each of us is subject to a growing burden made up of the obligations correlative to those rights; correspondingly the ability of rights to be protective of individual choice dissolves. Moreover, as the list of rights grows, so too does the legitimate role of political and legal institutions, and the libertarian case for radically limiting the scope and power of such institutions withers away. Libertarian theories of rights avoid generating an oppressive list of obligations through the employment of two crucial distinctions – the distinction between negative and positive rights and the distinction between general and special rights.

== See also ==
- Civil Rights
- Homophobia
- "Homosexual agenda"
- Human rights
- Marriage Equality
- Prerogative rights
- Qualified immunity

Potential Examples:

- Racial quota
- All-women shortlists
