= 1992 Colorado Amendment 2 =

Referendum on gay rights

Amendment 2
- November 3, 1992
- No Protected Status for Sexual Orientation Amendment

Results
Choice	Votes	%
Yes	813,966	53.41%
No	710,151	46.59%
Valid votes	1,524,117	95.43%
Invalid or blank votes	73,049	4.57%
Total votes	1,597,166	100.00%
Registered voters/turnout	2,003,375	79.72%
County results
For
80%–90%
70%–80%
60%–70%
50%–60%
Against
70%–80%
60%–70%
50%–60%

Amendment 2 was a ballot measure approved by Colorado voters on November 3, 1992, simultaneously with the United States presidential election. The amendment prevented municipalities from enacting anti-discrimination laws protecting gay, lesbian, or bisexual people.

The amendment's enactment prompted a widespread boycott. It was declared unconstitutional by the Supreme Court of the United States in Romer v. Evans (1996).

== Contents ==
The proposal appeared on the ballot as follows:

Shall there be an amendment to Article II of the Colorado Constitution to prohibit the state of Colorado and any of its political subdivisions from adopting or enforcing any law or policy which provides that homosexual, lesbian, or bisexual orientation, conduct, or relationships constitutes or entitles a person to claim any minority or protected status, quota preferences, or discrimination?

== Campaign ==
Several major cities in Colorado enacted laws prohibiting anti-gay discrimination, including Aspen in 1977, Boulder in 1987, and Denver in 1991. Literature from Colorado for Family Values (CFV), a conservative group based in Colorado Springs, presented municipal anti-discrimination laws as the first steps towards a "national 'gay-rights' law." CFV received support from national organizations involved in anti-gay campaigns, including Focus on the Family, which had moved its headquarters to Colorado Springs the year before. Focus on the Family donated campaign materials including a strategy guide for activists produced by the Family Research Council.

In March 1992, CFV submitted the required signatures for a ballot initiative. Their amendment would add the following passage to the state Constitution:

Neither the State of Colorado, through any of its branches or departments, nor any of its agencies, political subdivisions, municipalities or school districts, shall enact, adopt or enforce any statute, regulation, ordinance or policy whereby homosexual, lesbian or bisexual orientation, conduct, practices or relationships shall constitute or otherwise be the basis of or entitle any person or class of persons to have or claim any minority status, quota preferences, protected status or claim of discrimination. This Section of the Constitution shall be in all respects self-executing.

Taking advantage of public hostility toward affirmative action, campaigners invoked the idea of "special rights". In contrast to the actual municipal ordinances at issue, which only protected homosexuals from discrimination, the idea of "special rights" was used to persuade voters that gays and lesbians were seeking privileges for a chosen way of life at odds with societal norms. A focus group paid for by Equal Protection Ordinance Colorado (Note: Equal Protection Ordinance Colorado was a gay rights organization originally formed to campaign for Denver's anti-discrimination ordinance.) found that while Coloradans didn't agree with anti-gay discrimination, they disliked anything related to affirmative action.

The amendment was opposed by the ACLU, the League of Women Voters, Governor Roy Romer, Senate candidate Ben Nighthorse Campbell and Representative Pat Schroeder.

== Results ==
A poll taken by Talmey-Drake shortly before the election indicated that Amendment 2 would fail, with 42% voting for it and 52% voting against. On Election Day, however, Amendment 2 was approved with a margin of almost 7 points.

=== Results by county ===
County	Yes		No		Invalid votes
County	Votes	%	Votes	%	Invalid votes
Adams	55,400	54.36%	46,520	45.64%	3,140
Alamosa	2,666	59.38%	1,824	40.62%	1,060
Arapahoe	98,498	54.79%	81,290	45.21%	6,005
Archuleta	1,430	53.66%	1,235	46.34%	194
Baca	1,963	79.03%	521	20.97%	168
Bent	1,579	71.64%	625	28.36%	113
Boulder	48,704	38.61%	77,432	61.39%	4,722
Chaffee	3,922	64.30%	2,178	35.70%	277
Cheyenne	802	69.32%	355	30.68%	71
Clear Creek	2,046	46.49%	2,355	53.51%	102
Conejos	1,833	56.71%	1,399	43.29%	430
Costilla	628	48.27%	673	51.73%	508
Crowley	894	65.11%	479	34.89%	107
Custer	897	65.86%	465	34.14%	53
Delta	5,985	58.65%	4,220	41.35%	565
Denver	82,030	40.22%	121,919	59.78%	16,704
Dolores	509	66.02%	262	33.98%	89
Douglas	23,750	59.71%	16,024	40.29%	700
Eagle	4,087	38.53%	6,520	61.47%	403
Elbert	3,499	67.28%	1,702	32.72%	167
El Paso	105,518	65.88%	54,653	34.12%	9,538
Fremont	9,865	66.85%	4,893	33.15%	534
Garfield	6,651	48.29%	7,122	51.71%	334
Gilpin	752	43.09%	993	56.91%	27
Grand	2,519	51.78%	2,346	48.22%	115
Gunnison	2,442	43.34%	3,193	56.66%	182
Hinsdale	219	47.20%	245	52.80%	19
Huerfano	1,616	58.64%	1,140	41.36%	349
Jackson	568	61.01%	363	38.99%	42
Jefferson	119,970	55.06%	97,927	44.94%	8,033
Kiowa	811	80.78%	193	19.22%	40
Kit Carson	2,240	65.12%	1,200	34.88%	258
Lake	1,454	50.93%	1,401	49.07%	110
La Plata	7,001	46.14%	8,173	53.86%	848
Larimer	52,973	53.81%	45,464	46.19%	2,281
Las Animas	4,601	73.80%	1,633	26.20%	540
Lincoln	1,618	72.36%	618	27.64%	90
Logan	5,047	61.73%	3,129	38.27%	374
Mesa	24,214	55.65%	19,301	44.35%	1,539
Mineral	227	52.30%	207	47.70%	21
Moffatt	2,865	57.60%	2,109	42.40%	211
Montezuma	4,339	58.59%	3,067	41.41%	393
Montrose	7,107	62.21%	4,318	37.79%	532
Morgan	5,324	63.59%	3,048	36.41%	646
Otero	4,903	64.97%	2,643	35.03%	980
Ouray	783	51.08%	750	48.92%	69
Park	2,323	55.36%	1,873	44.64%	146
Phillips	1,498	68.25%	697	31.75%	139
Pitkin	2,026	28.09%	5,187	71.91%	330
Prowers	3,858	75.97%	1,220	24.03%	487
Pueblo	33,032	59.63%	22,360	40.37%	3,017
Rio Blanco	1,689	60.93%	1,083	39.07%	95
Rio Grande	2,940	66.65%	1,471	33.35%	254
Routt	3,997	49.86%	4,019	50.14%	222
Saguache	1,070	52.71%	960	47.29%	218
San Juan	206	46.82%	234	53.18%	20
San Miguel	855	33.86%	1,670	66.14%	156
Sedgwick	638	58.96%	444	41.04%	451
Summit	3,278	39.84%	4,950	60.16%	191
Teller	4,163	60.95%	2,667	39.05%	203
Washington	1,788	71.09%	727	28.91%	136
Weld	30,830	59.31%	21,148	40.69%	3,063
Yuma	3,026	69.72%	1,314	30.28%	218
Totals	813,966	53.41%	710,151	46.59%	73,049

== Aftermath ==
Following the vote, there were calls among liberals to boycott Colorado. A large part of the boycott was centered around tourism, a major industry in the state; many national organizations cancelled conventions that were planned to be held in Colorado and several city governments banned official travel to the state.

Some Hollywood productions moved away from Colorado, including Laurel Entertainment's The Stand miniseries. The boycott also prompted the creators of the in-production series Frasier to change the setting from Denver to Seattle.

The tourism industry lost about $40 million as a result of the boycott. A more drastic effect could be seen in film production, where revenue fell from about $28 million a year to $15 million.

The amendment was challenged in court by Denver municipal employee Richard G. Evans. On January 15, several hours before the amendment was scheduled to be signed into law, Denver District Court judge Jeff Bayless issued a temporary restraining order, giving himself a few more hours to review the case. Later that day, he issued a permanent injunction against the amendment. The state supreme court would find it unconstitutional in 1994, a position affirmed by the United States Supreme Court in 1996. Boycott Colorado, the main organization supporting the boycott, rescinded the call following the state supreme court's ruling.

== See also ==
- List of U.S. ballot initiatives to repeal LGBTQ anti-discrimination laws
