= Andrew Wommack =

American charismatic television evangelist (born 1949)

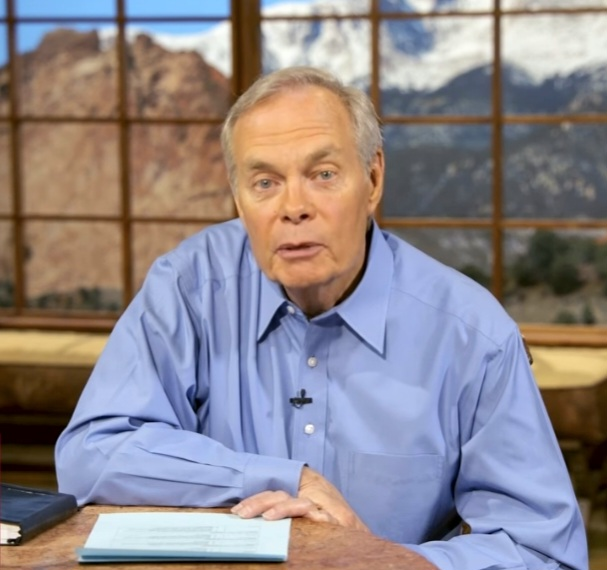
- Born: April 30, 1949 (age 77); Marshall, Texas, U.S.
- Known for: The Gospel Truth with Andrew Wommack, Charis Bible College
- Spouse: Jamie Wommack (m. 1972)
- Children: 2 sons

Andrew Wommack (born April 30, 1949, in Marshall, Texas) is an American conservative charismatic TV evangelist and faith healer. He founded Andrew Wommack Ministries in 1978 and Charis Bible College (originally Colorado Bible College) in 1994.

== History ==
Wommack started to preach in 1969. He married his wife Jamie in 1972. Over the next six years, the couple led three small churches and had two sons, Joshua and Jonathan Peter. In 1976, Andrew broadcast his first Gospel Truth radio program on a little country-and-western station in Childress, Texas. The Wommacks founded Andrew Wommack Ministries, Inc. in 1978 and moved their ministry to Colorado Springs in 1980. With the exception of a few months, Wommack claims he has been broadcasting the program ever since. The Gospel Truth television program began on the INSP Network in January 2000 and was eventually carried by other Christian television networks and some individual stations. Wommack joined Trinity Broadcasting Network's lineup with his own daily radio and television show Gospel Truth with Andrew Wommack.

=== Headquarters relocation ===
In 2009, Wommack acquired land in Woodland Park, Colorado, for the development of a campus serving Charis Bible College and his ministry. The college began using its first major building there in January 2014, and Andrew Wommack Ministries relocated its headquarters to Woodland Park in 2018.

== Charis Bible College ==
Wommack is the founder of Charis Bible College (CBC) (originally Colorado Bible College), an unaccredited Bible college that opened in 1994.

== Truth and Liberty Coalition ==
Wommack is one of the six co-founders of the Truth and Liberty Coalition, a dominionist organization that believes God has given Christians "a mandate to bring Godly change to our world, through the seven spheres of societal influence," i.e., religion and faith; family; education; government and law; media, news and commentary; arts and entertainment; and business and economics. The other five co-founders are Lance Wallnau, Karen Conrad, David Barton, William J. "Bill" Federer, and Richard Harris.

== Happenings ==
In 2018, in response to a question posed on a Facebook video where a viewer asked, "Why are so many Christians blinded and can't see how God is using Trump?" Wommack answered, "I do believe that there is a demonic deception that is blinding people."

In a 2019 interview, Wommack claimed that in March 2001, his son Jonathan Peter was resurrected after being dead for five hours. However, statements posted online by Desiree (Cannon) Wommack alleged that Jonathan was revived at the hospital following an overdose. She also alleged that she was the victim of spousal abuse and silenced by the ministry. As late as 2021, Wommack can be seen in interviews repeating the story of his son's resurrection.

In July 2020, the Colorado Attorney General's office sent a cease-and-desist letter to Andrew Wommack Ministries for violating state health orders after the ministry held an event of over 1,000 people in violation of the state's 175-person limit on indoor events.

In 2024, Wommack said he believed a second American Civil War would be a good thing if it resulted in the nation turning back to God.

== See also ==
- Seven Mountain Mandate
