= Washington State Medical Association =

The Washington State Medical Association (WSMA) is a professional organization providing tangible support of medical practice and access to physician services; promoting quality, cost effective care; and being a respected voice in the public arena.

== Mission ==
The WSMA is physician driven and patient focused, working to make Washington a better place to practice medicine and to receive care.
