= Pluribus News =

American digital media outlet

- Available in: English
- Founded: 2022
- Country of origin: United States
- Founder: Reid Wilson
- Employees: 6
- Website: pluribusnews.com

Pluribus News is an American digital media outlet that reports on state-level policy and legislation in the United States, primarily for lawmakers, lobbyists, and public affairs practitioners. The site, founded by Reid Wilson, began publishing in October 2022.

Pluribus News is financed by a mix of advertising, paid newsletter subscriptions, and live events.
