= Greater Seattle Business Association =

LGBT chamber of commerce

Coordinates: 47.615278°N 122.326329°W

GSBA - Washington States LGBTQ & Allied Chamber of Commerce
- Formation: 1981
- Type: Chamber of Commerce
- Legal status: Non-Profit, 501(c)(6); Scholarship Program, 501(c)(3)
- Purpose: The Four Pillars of GSBA: Business Development, Community, Advocacy, Philanthropy
- Location(s): Seattle, Washington; US
- Region served: Puget Sound, Washington
- Members: 1,400 (approx)
- President & CEO: Ilona Lohrey
- Key people: Jenny Harding and Danny Cords; Board Co-Chairs
- Main organ: Board of Directors
- Staff: 17
- Volunteers: 100-200 annually
- Website: thegsba.org

The Greater Seattle Business Association (GSBA) is an LGBTQ+ chamber of commerce based in Seattle, Washington. The majority of the organization's membership are small businesses located throughout the Puget Sound area. The association's stated mission is "to combine business development, leadership and social action to expand economic opportunities for the lesbian, gay, bisexual, transgender, and queer community and those who support equality for all."

== History ==
GSBA was stablished in 1981. It represents over 1,300 small business, corporate, and nonprofit members.

In 1992, GSBA formed the Western Business Alliance in partnership with the Greater San Diego Business Association and the Camelback Business Association of Phoenix. In 1997, the WBA brought together 21 LGBT-and-allied organizations—from Vancouver, British Columbia, in the north, to Tijuana, Mexico, in the south. With the establishment of the National Gay & Lesbian Chamber of Commerce in 2004 (of which GSBA was a founding member), GSBA's current executive director, Louise Chernin, was appointed National Chair on the Council on Chambers and Business Organizations (CCBO), a position she held for four years. The following year, the WBA voted in favor of folding into the NGLCC's CCBO structure as the Pacific Regional Council.

=== Gay Wedding Show ===
GSBA was the presenting sponsor of the first Gay Wedding Show in 2004. Held at Seattle's Swedish Cultural Center, the event hosted 50 vendors and was the first of its kind in Seattle.

=== Awards ===
In November 2008, GSBA was awarded "Chamber of the Year" by the National Gay & Lesbian Chamber of Commerce (NGLCC) in Washington, D.C., recognizing its leadership among more than 45 other regional LGBT and allied chambers. In 2009, GSBA was the host affiliate chamber for NGLCC's Sixth Annual Out for Business Conference, held in Seattle. That year, GSBA received the "Community Outreach Award" for its scholarship program.

== Activities ==
=== Marriage equality ===
In 2006, when efforts were undertaken to repeal Washington's non-discrimination law through public referendum, GSBA stood alongside other organizations in support of Washington Won't Discriminate, a group opposing the referendum. In 2009, enough signatures were obtained by put Referendum 71 on that year's general election ballot. This referendum would have overturned the state's third and final expansion of domestic partnership law passed by the legislature earlier that year. GSBA was among 282 coalition partners of Washington Families Standing Together, the organization that led the campaign to approve Referendum 71.

=== Candidate forum ===
Every September, the organization holds a debate-like program, the GSBA Candidate Forum. The event is billed as "the region's only LGBT candidate forum". The forum has featured candidates from local races such as city and county councils as well as larger offices including Washington Governor and U.S. House of Representatives.

In 2009, then mayoral candidate Mike McGinn was criticized for his "rude" treatment of GSBA staff members while attending that year's event. Subsequently, he won the 2009 election.

=== Scholarship program ===
In 1990, two teachers saw a need for LGBT and allied students who needed financial assistance with higher education expenses. At the time it was the nation's first LGBT and allied scholarship fund. Six years into the program, the organization had granted five scholarships totaling $10,000. In 1998, Richard C. Rolfs (a Wenatchee-native and longtime gay rights activist) bequeathed $200,000 to the GSBA Scholarship Fund, establishing an endowment in his name. By 2001, the program was granting more than $50,000 each year in undergraduate scholarships.

The GSBA Scholarship Fund awards scholarships to LGBTQ and allied students who exhibit leadership potential, demonstrate strong academic abilities, and are actively involved in school and community organizations. Founded in 1991, the GSBA Scholarship Fund has awarded over 650 scholarships totaling over $3 million.

In May 2010, at the Annual Scholarship Awards Dinner, GSBA gave out its one millionth dollar ($1,000,000) in cumulative scholarship grants. The following November the primary fundraising event for the program, The Taste of GSBA, grossed $345,000 from the dinner auction.

GSBA hosts an annual celebration of excellence, leadership, and philanthropy within the GSBA business and nonprofit communities.

The association participates each year in Seattle's LGBT pride festivities. In 2006 graphic designer Andrea Rouleau designed a birthday cake float to celebrate GSBA's 25th anniversary.

=== Pandemic support for businesses ===
During the COVID-19 pandemic in 2020, GSBA worked with large employers and private donors in the Seattle area to provide financial assistance to local small businesses that were struggling due to the pandemic. This assistance is credited with saving local businesses and preventing them from closing.

== See also ==
- List of LGBT organizations
