= Washington Education Association =

The Washington Education Association (WEA) is a statewide union representing public school employees in the state of Washington, United States. The WEA is the Washington affiliate of the National Education Association and it is the largest school employee union in the state. The union represents certificated school employees (teachers, teacher-librarians, counselors, etc) and education support professionals (paraeducators, secretarial/clerical workers, bus drivers, custodians, maintenance workers, food service workers, security workers, healthcare workers, skilled trades workers, and technical staff). It was founded on April 2–3, 1889 as the Washington State Teachers Association. The WEA was the defendant in Davenport v. Washington Education Ass'n, a landmark public-sector union case decided by the Supreme Court of the United States.

== Leadership ==
President: Janie White (2026-)

Vice President: Tami Lindquist (2026-)

Executive Director: Aimee Iverson

Prior to being elected president in 2026, White served as WEA vice-president from 2019 to 2026. Before that, she worked as a office worker at Nelson Middle School in Renton, WA.

Lindquist was a Physical Education and elementary school teacher before being elected to statewide union office.
