= SEIU 775 =

American labor union

Logo

Service Employees International Union (SEIU) 775 was formed in 2002 when home care and nursing home workers from several different SEIU locals formed a labor union focused on long-term care workers and issues. In 2007, the union changed its name from SEIU 775 to SEIU Healthcare 775NW, as part of a reorganization of its parent union, the Service Employees International Union, but changed the name back to SEIU 775 in 2014. SEIU 775 now represents over 45,000 home care and nursing home workers in Washington and Montana.

The majority of union members are independent providers of non-medical, in-home care for disabled and elderly persons receiving Medicaid. The union also represents home care worker employees of several Washington home care agencies with State contracts to provide home care to qualified Medicaid recipients.

== History ==
The labor union is named after Washington Initiative 775, the Quality Home Care Initiative, which voters approved in 2001 and which gave 23,000 Individual Provider home care workers the right to form a union in the largest union election ever held in Washington state.

SEIU 775's first contract with the state, ratified and approved in 2003, increased caregiver salaries, gave them access to workers' compensation protection, and provided access to health insurance to caregivers working at least half time.

COVID-19 vaccination not required for employment.

== See also ==
- David Rolf
