= List of Montana ballot measures =

The following is a list of statewide initiatives and referendums modifying state law and proposing state constitutional amendments in Montana, sorted by election.

== 1900–1919 ==
=== 1900 ===
Measure name	Description	Status	Yes votes	No votes
Amendment 1	A constitutional amendment permitting district court judges to sit on the Montana Supreme Court when a Supreme Court justice is disqualified.	Passed	7,689 (70.19%)	3,265 (29.81%)

=== 1902 ===
Measure name	Description	Status	Yes votes	No votes
Amendment 1	A constitutional amendment setting a term limit of 6 years for county commissioners.	Passed	11,126 (56.34%)	8,622 (43.66%)

=== 1904 ===
Measure name	Description	Status	Yes votes	No votes
Amendment 1	A constitutional amendment providing for an 8-hour workday in mills, smelters, mines, and government employment.	Passed	28,631 (88.44%)	3,742 (11.56%)
Amendment 2	A constitutional amendment prohibiting the employment of children under the age of 16 in underground mines.	Passed	29,237 (92.43%)	2,394 (7.57%)

=== 1906 ===
Measure name	Description	Status	Yes votes	No votes
Amendment 1	A constitutional amendment establishing the initiative and referendum process.	Passed	36,374 (84.61%)	6,616 (15.39%)

=== 1908 ===
Measure name	Description	Status	Yes votes	No votes
Amendment 1	A constitutional amendment creating a state depository board.	Passed	29,273 (73.22%)	10,653 (26.68%)
Amendment 2	A constitutional amendment increasing the tax levy to 3 mills.	Failed	14,184 (35.56%)	25,706 (64.44%)
Referendum 1	A measure creating a state bond for higher education.	Passed	24,809 (65.77%)	12,910 (34.23%)

=== 1910 ===
Measure name	Description	Status	Yes votes	No votes
Amendment 1	A constitutional amendment increasing the tax levy to 2.5 mills.	Passed	34,481 (65.85%)	17,883 (34.15%)

=== 1912 ===
Measure name	Description	Status	Yes votes	No votes
Referendum 1	A measure allowing the issuance of a $533,000 bond to buy property for a mental health facility.	Passed	34,235 (52.92%)	30,461 (47.08%)
IR 300-301	A referendum organizing a state militia.	Failed	21,195 (33.67%)	41,749 (66.33%)
I 302-303	An initiative providing for party nomination by direct vote.	Passed	46,473 (78.30%)	12,879 (21.70%)
I 304-305	An initiative limiting campaign spending for public office candidates.	Passed	44,337 (76.47%)	13,645 (23.53%)
I 306-307	An initiative instructing the state legislature to vote for US Senators based on referendums instead of by party.	Passed	45,620 (78.57%)	12,442 (21.43%)
I 308-309	An initiative providing for direct presidential preference primaries.	Passed	46,241 (79.20%)	12,144 (20.80%)

=== 1914 ===
Measure name	Description	Status	Yes votes	No votes
Amendment 1	A constitutional amendment granting women the right to vote and hold office.	Passed	41,302 (52.35%)	37,588 (47.65%)
Referendum 1	A measure creating a levy to support educational institutions.	Failed	28,703 (38.29%)	46,265 (61.71%)
IR-6	A referendum establishing an athletic commission to regulate boxing and sparring.	Failed	34,440 (44.72%)	42,581 (55.28%)
I-7	An initiative providing compensation to injured workers in certain industries and imposing penalties for violations of safety regulations.	Failed	36,979 (45.51%)	44,275 (54.49%)
I-8	An initiative providing for the investment of state educational, charitable, and penal institution funds.	Passed	45,132 (61.91%)	27,780 (38.09%)
I-9	An initiative consolidating state higher education institutions into the University of Montana.	Failed	30,465 (39.68%)	46,311 (60.32%)

=== 1916 ===
Measure name	Description	Status	Yes votes	No votes
Amendment 1	A constitutional amendment creating boards of equalization for the state and each county to adjust and equalize the valuation of taxable property.	Passed	74,257 (54.97%)	60,839 (45.03%)
Amendment 2	A constitutional amendment exempting governmental and nonprofit organizations from taxation.	Failed	48,656 (36.90%)	83,198 (63.10%)
Referendum 1	A measure issuing a bond for the establishment of a twine factory in the state prison.	Failed	68,059 (46.23%)	79,158 (53.77%)
R-10	A measure prohibiting the manufacture and sale of alcohol.	Passed	102,776 (58.18%)	73,890 (41.82%)
I-11	A measure establishing an athletics commission.	Failed	72,162 (48.54%)	76,510 (51.46%)

=== 1918 ===
Measure name	Description	Status	Yes votes	No votes
Amendment 1	A constitutional amendment exempting mortgages from taxation.	Passed	55,296 (64.37%)	30,614 (35.63%)
Referendum 1	A measure issuing $250,000 in bonds for a terminal grain elevator.	Passed	54,215 (64.66%)	29,630 (35.34%)
I-12	A measure regulating the practice of chiropractors.	Passed	46,302 (54.08%)	39,320 (45.92%)

== 1980–1999 ==
=== 1980 ===
Measure name	Description	Status	Yes votes	No votes
C-9	A constitutional amendment allowing exceptions to the confidentiality of the documents of the Judicial Standards Commission, which investigates misconduct by judges.	Passed	181,140 (58.33%)	129,394 (41.67%)
I-84	An initiative prohibiting the disposal of radioactive waste in Montana.	Passed	172,909 (50.06%)	172,493 (49.94%)
I-85	An initiative requiring public disclosure of money spent on lobbying public officials.	Passed	259,698 (77.28%)	76,358 (22.72%)
I-86	An initiative changing the income tax structure to prevent tax increases based solely on inflation.	Passed	233,497 (69.47%)	102,635 (30.53%)
I-87	An initiative providing for the establishment of a voluntary recycling program and prohibiting the sale of non-refillable glass and plastic bottles.	Failed	100,761 (28.81%)	248,928 (71.19%)

=== 1982 ===
Measure name	Description	Status	Yes votes	No votes
C-10	A constitutional amendment removing the restriction on investing public funds in corporate capital stock.	Failed	128,607 (45.63%)	153,264 (54.37%)
C-11	A constitutional amendment providing that the legislature meet annually for 60 days in odd-numbered years and 45 days in even numbered years.	Failed	118,980 (41.00%)	171,196 (59.00%)
C-12	A constitutional amendment allowing a poll of legislators to be conducted by mail in order to override the governor's veto when the legislature is not in session.	Passed	147,463 (52.85%)	131,560 (47.15%)
LR-89	A measure repealing the prohibition on the disposal of radioactive waste in Montana.	Failed	70,375 (24.05%)	222,210 (75.95%)
I-91	An initiative expressing opposition to the placement of missiles in Montana.	Passed	168,594 (57.41%)	125,092 (42.59%)
I-92	An initiative expanding authorized gambling and creating a state gaming commission to regulate gambling.	Failed	115,297 (37.60%)	191,334 (62.40%)
I-94	An initiative abolishing the quota system for beer and wine licenses and allowing businesses with sufficient equipment to sell meals to apply for a license to sell beer and wine.	Failed	125,092 (39.85%)	168,594 (60.15%)
I-95	An initiative providing that 25% of all future deposits to the permanent coal tax trust fund be invested in the Montana's economy.	Passed	83,813 (25.38%)	246,368 (74.62%)

=== 1984 ===
Measure name	Description	Status	Yes votes	No votes
C-13	A constitutional amendment allowing the Supreme Court to discipline a judge or justice for violations of judicial ethics.	Passed	287,926 (80.84%)	68,251 (19.16%)
C-14	A constitutional amendment requiring the redistricting of congressional districts within 90 days of the census.	Passed	214,956 (66.19%)	109,813 (33.81%)
I-96	An initiative abolishing the state board of milk control and eliminating price controls and certain regulations on the sale of milk.	Failed	145,342 (39.54%)	222,200 (60.46%)
I-97	An initiative permitting the state licensing of denturists.	Passed	194,285 (53.12%)	171,448 (46.88%)

=== 1986 ===
Measure name	Description	Status	Yes votes	No votes
C-15	A constitutional amendment removing the legal drinking age of 19 from the Montana Constitution and allowing the legislature or the voters to establish a legal drinking age.	Passed	207,233 (66.03%)	106,611 (33.97%)
C-16	A constitutional amendment repealing the requirement that a salary commission recommend compensation for elected officials.	Passed	172,517 (59.76%)	116,143 (40.24%)
CI-27	A constitutional amendment abolishing property taxes and requiring voter approval for the imposition of a sales tax or an increase in the income or sales tax.	Failed	140,090 (44.18%)	177,016 (55.82%)
CI-30	A constitutional amendment authorizing the legislature to determine the rights and remedies for injury or damage.	Passed	175,502 (56.22%)	136,653 (43.78%)
LR-100	A measure establishing a state lottery.	Passed	216,706 (68.98%)	97,459 (31.02%)
I-104	An initiative prohibiting the state from controlling the price of milk.	Failed	153,293 (48.80%)	160,835 (51.20%)
I-105	An initiative limiting property taxes to the amounts levied in 1986.	Passed	166,694 (54.91%)	136,904 (45.09%)

=== 1988 ===
Measure name	Description	Status	Yes votes	No votes
C-17	A constitutional amendment removing certain restrictions on the investment of public funds.	Failed	122,854 (36.09%)	217,536 (63.91%)
C-18	A constitutional amendment allowing the legislature greater discretion in providing economic assistance and social services.	Passed	182,037 (52.45%)	165,056 (47.55%)
C-19	A constitutional amendment allowing the legislature to establish residency requirements for judges.	Passed	224,937 (65.88%)	116,500 (34.12%)
C-20	A constitutional amendment requiring the legislature to meet annually for no more than 100 days in 2 years.	Failed	169,491 (48.66%)	178,855 (51.34%)
LR-106	A measure authorizing the legislature to continue a 6-mill property tax levy to fund the Montana University System for 10 years.	Passed	227,638 (64.14%)	127,259 (35.86%)
I-110	An initiative repealing the requirement that occupants of motor vehicles wear a seatbelt.	Failed	155,481 (42.41%)	211,090 (57.59%)
I-113	An initiative establishing a system of refundable deposits on beverage containers.	Failed	78,509 (21.45%)	287,461 (78.55%)

=== 1990 ===
Measure name	Description	Status	Yes votes	No votes
CC-1	A measure calling for a constitutional convention.	Failed	53,630 (17.96%)	245,009 (82.04%)
C-21	A constitutional amendment requiring a valid election to be held on qualified ballot issues.	Passed	166,143 (56.20%)	129,477 (43.80%)
CI-55	A constitutional amendment repealing existing taxes and requiring state funding to come from a trade charge.	Failed	78,254 (25.16%)	232,807 (74.84%)
I-115	An initiative increasing the sales tax on cigarettes to $0.43 per pack and to 25% for other tobacco products.	Failed	130,707 (40.92%)	188,732 (59.08%)

=== 1992 ===
==== June 1992 ====
Measure name	Description	Status	Yes votes	No votes
LR-109	A measure imposing a property tax levy of 2 mills to fund vocational and technical education programs.	Failed	76,546 (36.38%)	133,841 (63.62%)
LR-110	A measure creating the Treasure State Endowment Fund to provide local governments coal severance tax trust fund interest for infrastructure projects.	Passed	132,820 (62.54%)	79,562 (37.46%)

==== November 1992 ====
Measure name	Description	Status	Yes votes	No votes
C-22	A constitutional amendment changing how state judges and justices are elected.	Passed	279,894 (74.40%)	96,313 (25.60%)
C-23	A constitutional amendment allowing the state to transfer public lands to a local government at less than full market value.	Failed	176,082 (46.15%)	205,485 (53.85%)
C-24	A constitutional amendment increasing the membership of the board to regents from 7 to 8 members and requiring at least one of the board members to be Native American.	Failed	105,475 (27.21%)	282,172 (72.79%)
CI-63	A constitutional amendment requiring coal severance taxes to be placed into a special fund for the next 10 years and allowing the legislature to appropriate the fund's principal for financing the costs of local government facilities and improvements.	Failed	165,126 (42.94%)	219,403 (57.06%)
CI-64	A constitutional amendment prohibiting certain public officials from seeking reelection if they have already held office for a certain number of years.	Passed	264,174 (66.90%)	130,695 (33.10%)

=== 1993 ===
Measure name	Description	Status	Yes votes	No votes
LR-111	A measure imposing a 4% sales tax and reducing income and property taxes.	Failed	78,349 (25.53%)	228,587 (74.47%)

=== 1994 ===
Measure name	Description	Status	Yes votes	No votes
C-25	A constitutional amendment prohibiting the legislature from spending public pension fund assets.	Passed	243,855 (73.41%)	88,336 (26.59%)
C-26	A constitutional amendment giving the governor 10 days to act on a bill regardless of if the legislature is in session.	Passed	237,236 (70.49%)	99,334 (29.51%)
C-27	A constitutional amendment setting a 4% limit on the sales tax rate.	Passed	175,618 (53.83%)	150,649 (46.17%)
C-28	A constitutional amendment allowing property values to be based on the purchase value and allowing limits on increases in property value for tax purposes.	Failed	138,475 (41.37%)	196,277 (58.63%)
CI-66	A constitutional amendment requiring voter approval of any new or increased taxes at the state and local level.	Failed	159,282 (46.68%)	181,938 (53.32%)
CI-67	A constitutional amendment requiring a two-thirds vote of the legislature to increase taxes or government spending.	Failed	167,225 (48.92%)	174,616 (51.08%)
IR-112	A referendum enacting a single income tax rate of 6.7% instead of the current rates from 2% to 11%.	Failed	83,813 (25.38%)	246,368 (74.62%)
I-118	An initiative establishing limits on campaign contributions and prohibiting the carryover of surplus campaign funds.	Passed	200,679 (60.69%)	129,983 (39.31%)

=== 1996 ===
Measure name	Description	Status	Yes votes	No votes
C-30	A constitutional amendment replacing the Board of Education, Board of Regents, and the Commissioner of Higher Education with a department of education and a state education commission.	Failed	142,224 (37.00%)	242,146 (73.00%)
C-31	A constitutional amendment allowing state compensation insurance fund money to be invested in private corporate capital stock.	Failed	166,752 (43.78%)	214,120 (56.22%)
C-32	A constitutional amendment allowing the legislature to meet every two years for 90 days in either even-numbered or odd-numbered years, rather than only in odd-numbered years.	Failed	174,471 (47.02%)	196,618 (52.98%)
I-121	An initiative increasing the state minimum wage to $6.25 per hour by the year 2000.	Failed	175,769 (43.53%)	227,975 (56.47%)
I-122	An initiative requiring specified levels of toxins to be removed from mine discharges prior to dilution or release into state waters.	Failed	175,534 (43.25%)	230,283 (56.75%)
I-123	An initiative allowing lawsuits against persons who engage in unlawful threats or intimidation that cause injury or harm and prohibiting the filing of non-consensual common-law liens against property.	Passed	200,682 (52.68%)	180,295 (47.32%)
I-125	An initiative prohibiting direct corporate spending on ballot measures except by nonprofits and setting a voluntary spending limit of $150,000 per year for ballot issue committees.	Passed	201,186 (52.35%)	183,114 (47.65%)
I-132	An initiative requiring the words "Disregarded Montana Voters on Term Limits" to be printed next to the name of any state legislative and congressional candidates on the ballot who fail to support a term limits amendment to the US Constitution.	Failed	172,911 (45.45%)	207,508 (54.55%)

=== 1998 ===
Measure name	Description	Status	Yes votes	No votes
C-33	A constitutional amendment providing that criminal laws must be based on principles of public safety and restitution for victims, in addition to prevention and reformation.	Passed	225,349 (71.38%)	90,349 (28.62%)
CI-75	A constitutional amendment requiring voter approval of any new or increased taxes at the state and local level.	Passed	167,321 (51.20%)	159,499 (48.80%)
LR-113	A measure allowing the legislature to continue levying a six-mill property tax for 10 years to fund the Montana University system.	Passed	199,871 (61.40%)	125,656 (38.60%)
IR-114	A referendum prohibiting all corporate spending on ballot measure campaigns, including spending by nonprofits.	Passed	161,476 (52.79%)	144,425 (47.21%)
I-134	An initiative repealing the Montana Retail Motor Fuel Marketing Act, which prevents fuel dealers from selling fuel below cost to drive out competition.	Passed	172,081 (53.99%)	146,629 (46.01%)
I-136	An initiative eliminating the requirement that nonresidents hire an outfitter to purchase a combination hunting and fishing license.	Failed	141,425 (43.96%)	180,280 (56.04%)
I-137	An initiative prohibiting cyanide leach processing at new open-pit gold and silver mines.	Passed	169,991 (52.30%)	155,034 (47.70%)

== 2000–2019 ==
=== 2000 ===
Measure name	Description	Status	Yes votes	No votes
C-34	A constitutional amendment allowing money in the state workers' compensation insurance fund to be invested in private corporate capital stock.	Passed	197,399 (52.19%)	180,850 (47.81%)
C-35	A constitutional amendment requiring at least 40% of the tobacco litigation settlement money to be dedicated to a trust fund for tobacco disease prevention and health care programs.	Passed	287,432 (73.43%)	103,979 (26.57%)
LR-115	A measure repealing the sales tax on new motor vehicles and replacing the light vehicle tax system with a registration fee based on the vehicle's age.	Passed	228,737 (57.60%)	168,396 (42.40%)
LR-116	A measure repealing the state inheritance tax.	Passed	265,951 (67.81%)	126,274 (32.19%)
I-143	An initiative prohibiting new alternative livestock ranches, also known as game farms.	Passed	204,282 (51.41%)	193,079 (48.59%)

=== 2002 ===
Measure name	Description	Status	Yes votes	No votes
C-36	A constitutional amendment allowing for investment of assets from local government group self-insurance programs in private corporate capital stocks.	Failed	122,822 (39.42%)	188,715 (60.58%)
C-37	A constitutional amendment requiring signatures from at least 10% of voters in at least half of Montana's counties (rather than two-fifths of legislative districts) to place a constitutional amendment on the ballot.	Passed	179,616 (57.17%)	134,538 (42.83%)
C-38	A constitutional amendment requiring signatures from at least 5% of voters in at least half of Montana's counties (rather than one-third of legislative districts) to place a statutory initiative on the ballot.	Passed	178,946 (57.58%)	131,849 (42.42%)
C-39	A constitutional amendment allowing public funds to be invested in private corporate capital stock.	Failed	108,450 (34.65%)	204,557 (65.35%)
IR-117	A referendum regarding the deregulation of the electricity industry.	Failed	116,370 (39.54%)	177,966 (60.46%)
I-145	An initiative creating a public power commission to determine whether purchasing hydroelectric dams is in the public interest.	Failed	103,742 (31.85%)	221,999 (68.15%)
I-146	An initiative dedicating 49% of the tobacco settlement funds for a tobacco disease prevention program for Montanans who cannot afford health insurance.	Passed	209,638 (64.96%)	113,065 (35.04%)

=== 2004 ===
Measure name	Description	Status	Yes votes	No votes
C-40	A constitutional amendment establishing a $10 million trust fund for noxious weed management.	Passed	323,929 (75.51%)	105,086 (24.49%)
C-41	A constitutional amendment providing for a right to harvest wild fish and game animals.	Passed	345,505 (80.60%)	83,185 (19.40%)
C-42	A constitutional amendment increasing term limits for state legislators from 8 years in a 16-year period to 12 years in a 24-year period.	Failed	136,931 (31.40%)	299,162 (68.60%)
CI-96	A constitutional amendment defining marriage as between a man and a woman.	Passed	295,070 (66.56%)	148,263 (33.44%)
I-147	An initiative allowing open-pit gold and silver mines to use cyanide leach processing.	Failed	185,974 (41.96%)	257,280 (58.04%)
I-148	An initiative legalizing marijuana for medical use.	Passed	276,042 (61.81%)	170,579 (38.19%)
I-149	An initiative increasing tobacco taxes and allocating revenue to various programs.	Passed	282,448 (63.32%)	163,626 (36.68%)

=== 2006 ===
Measure name	Description	Status	Yes votes	No votes
C-43	A constitutional amendment changing the name of the state auditor to the insurance commissioner.	Failed	133,219 (35.95%)	237,367 (64.05%)
I-151	An initiative raising the minimum wage to $6.15 per hour and adding an annual adjustment based on the cost of living.	Passed	285,535 (72.69%)	107,294 (27.31%)
I-153	An initiative prohibiting former state officials and their staff from becoming lobbyists within 24 months after their departure from the state government.	Passed	288,098 (75.54%)	93,291 (24.46%)

=== 2008 ===
Measure name	Description	Status	Yes votes	No votes
C-44	A constitutional amendment allowing 25% of certain public funds to be invested in private corporate capital stock.	Failed	118,178 (25.93%)	337,656 (74.07%)
LR-118	A measure continuing a six-mill property tax to fund the Montana University system.	Passed	264,158 (56.79%)	200,957 (43.21%)
I-155	An initiative expanding healthcare programs for uninsured children in Montana.	Passed	329,289 (69.91%)	141,701 (30.09%)

=== 2010 ===
Measure name	Description	Status	Yes votes	No votes
CC-2	A measure calling for a constitutional convention.	Failed	140,869 (41.49%)	198,664 (58.51%)
CI-105	A constitutional amendment prohibiting the imposition of a tax on the sale of transfer of real property.	Passed	259,621 (72.62%)	97,891 (27.38%)
I-161	An initiative increasing nonresident hunting license fees and allocating revenue to hunting access and habitat preservation and restoration.	Passed	187,870 (53.82%)	161,201 (46.18%)
I-164	An initiative capping yearly interest rates of payday and title loans at 36%.	Passed	253,475 (71.76%)	99,749 (28.24%)

=== 2012 ===
Measure name	Description	Status	Yes votes	No votes
LR-120	A measure requiring parental notification at least 48 hours before performing an abortion on a pregnant minor under 16 years old.	Passed	334,416 (70.55%)	139,598 (29.45%)
LR-121	A measure requiring proof of citizenship for a person to receive state services.	Passed	378,563 (79.51%)	97,528 (20.49%)
LR-122	A measure prohibiting the government from mandating the purchase of health insurance or imposing penalties on those who do not purchase health insurance.	Passed	318,612 (67.20%)	155,536 (32.80%)
IR-124	A referendum that would repeal I-148 and enact a new medical marijuana program.	Passed	268,790 (57.25%)	200,730 (42.75%)
I-166	An initiative requiring state lawmakers to implement a policy on prohibiting corporate campaign contributions and expenditures in elections.	Passed	343,549 (74.67%)	116,554 (25.33%)

=== 2014 ===
Measure name	Description	Status	Yes votes	No votes
C-45	A constitutional amendment renaming the position of state auditor to "Commissioner of Securities and Insurance."	Failed	166,758 (48.42%)	177,615 (51.58%)
LR-126	A measure changing the deadline for late voter registration to the Friday before election day.	Failed	155,153 (42.89%)	206,584 (57.11%)

=== 2016 ===
Measure name	Description	Status	Yes votes	No votes
CI-116	A constitutional amendment protecting the rights of crime victims in the Montana Constitution.	Passed	325,934 (66.09%)	167,261 (33.91%)
I-177	An initiative prohibiting the use of animal traps and snares on state public lands.	Failed	185,908 (37.30%)	312,455 (62.70%)
I-181	An initiative establishing the Montana Biomedical Research Authority and authorizing $20 million per year in bonds for ten years to fund it.	Failed	208,883 (42.67%)	280,604 (57.33%)
I-182	An initiative repealing the three-patient limit for medical marijuana providers and allowing physicians to prescribe marijuana for chronic pain and PTSD.	Passed	291,334 (57.87%)	212,089 (42.13%)

=== 2018 ===
Measure name	Description	Status	Yes votes	No votes
LR-128	A measure renewing a six-mill property tax to fund the Montana University System through 2028.	Passed	307,704 (62.94%)	181,171 (37.06%)
LR-129	A measure allowing only certain individuals to collect other people's election ballots.	Passed	301,172 (62.81%)	178,324 (37.19%)
I-185	An initiative extending Medicaid expansion programs and raising taxes on tobacco products to fund it.	Failed	236,990 (47.30%)	264,087 (52.70%)
I-186	An initiative establishing new requirements for hard rock mine permits based on water quality standards.	Failed	220,266 (44.36%)	276,232 (55.64%)

== 2020– ==
=== 2020 ===
Measure name	Description	Status	Yes votes	No votes
C-46	A constitutional amendment changing constitutional language to match existing signature distribution requirements for initiated constitutional amendments.	Passed	426,279 (76.87%)	128,295 (23.13%)
C-47	A constitutional amendment changing constitutional language to match existing signature distribution requirements for initiated state statutes and veto referendums.	Passed	411,153 (74.56%)	140,300 (25.44%)
CI-118	A constitutional amendment allowing the establishment of a legal age for the use of marijuana.	Passed	340,847 (57.84%)	248,442 (42.16%)
LR-130	A measure removing local governments' authority to regulate the concealed carry of firearms.	Passed	298,388 (50.96%)	287,129 (49.04%)
I-190	An initiative legalizing marijuana and imposing a 20% tax on marijuana sales.	Passed	341,037 (56.90%)	258,337 (43.10%)

=== 2022 ===
Measure name	Description	Status	Yes votes	No votes
C-48	A constitutional amendment requiring the state to obtain a search warrant to access electronic data or communications.	Passed	365,091 (82.33%)	78,334 (17.67%)
LR-131	A measure granting legal personhood to infants born alive and requiring medical care to be provided to any infants born alive.	Failed	213,001 (47.45%)	235,904 (52.55%)

=== 2024 ===
Measure name	Description	Status	Yes votes	No votes
CI-126	A constitutional amendment establishing a top-four primary for certain federal and state offices.	Failed	287,837 (48.91%)	300,664 (51.09%)
CI-127	A constitutional amendment requiring candidates for certain offices to receive a majority of the vote to win the election.	Failed	228,908 (39.62%)	348,805 (60.38%)
CI-128	A constitutional amendment providing for a right to abortion before fetal viability.	Passed	345,070 (57.76%)	252,300 (42.24%)

=== 2026 ===
Measure name	Description	Status	Yes votes	No votes
CI-132	A constitutional amendment requiring judicial elections to remain nonpartisan.	Passed		
CI-133	A constitutional amendment declaring the right to propose ballot measures and challenge laws through referendums.	Passed		
I-194	An initiative prohibiting "artificial persons", such as non-profits, trusts, partnerships, corporations, and trade associations, from spending money on elections and political parties.	Passed		
