= 2026 Montana elections =

A general election was held in the U.S. state of Montana on November 3, 2026 as part of the 2026 United States elections.

The primary election was June 2, 2026.

This was the first general election in Montana requiring photo identification. Senate Bill 276 was signed into law on May 5, 2025. Prior to this, Montana citizens could use a non-picture voter card or even certain mail documents to provide proof of address for voting purposes.

== Federal ==
=== United States Senate ===
- 2026 United States Senate election in Montana

=== United States House of Representatives ===
- 2026 United States House of Representatives elections in Montana

== Executive ==
- 2026 Montana Public Service Commission election

== Legislature ==
- 2026 Montana House of Representatives election
- 2026 Montana Senate election

== Judicial ==
- 2026 Montana Supreme Court election

== Ballot measures ==
- CI-132 amends the Montana Constitution to require that judicial elections remain nonpartisan.
- CI-133 amends the constitution to protect initiatives and referendums from unjustified interference by the government. Specifically, this act requires impartial, predictable, open, and timely processes for ballot issues, including approving petitions and ballot statements, resolving legal challenges, and verifying signatures. It requires the state to allow ample time for signature gathering, prohibits disqualification of petitions because of minor or technical issues, and allows voters to withdraw their signatures if they so choose.
- I-194 limits the powers of artificial persons to those powers necessary or convenient as provided by law. These powers must exclude contributing anything of value to candidate elections, supporting or opposing political parties, or supporting or opposing state or local ballot issues.
