= Susie Lee =

American politician (born 1966)

- Official portrait, 2026

Member of the U.S. House of Representatives from Nevada's 3rd district
- Incumbent
- Assumed office January 3, 2019
- Preceded by: Jacky Rosen

Personal details
- Born: Suzanne Marie Kelley; November 7, 1966 (age 60) Canton, Ohio, U.S.
- Party: Democratic
- Spouse: Dan Lee (m. 2000; div. 2021)
- Children: 2
- Relatives: Sam Forstag (nephew)
- Education: Carnegie Mellon University (BA, MS)
- Website: House website Campaign website

Suzanne Marie Lee (née Kelley; born November 7, 1966) is an American politician who has served as the U.S. representative for Nevada's 3rd congressional district since 2019. A member of the Democratic Party, she represents southern Las Vegas and much of unincorporated Clark County.

Born in Canton, Ohio, Lee graduated from Carnegie Mellon University and then moved to Las Vegas in 1993, where she led education nonprofits. After losing the 2016 Democratic primary in Nevada's 4th congressional district, she was elected in the 3rd district in 2018 to succeed Jacky Rosen, and has been reelected in 2020, 2022, 2024, and 2026.

Lee is a member of the New Democrat Coalition and is a vice chair of the bipartisan Problem Solvers Caucus, and is considered one of the most bipartisan House Democrats based on her voting history.

== Early life and education ==
Suzanne Marie Kelley was born and raised in Canton, Ohio, as one of eight children. Her father, Warren Kelley, was a Korean War veteran and structural engineer, while her mother, Joan Kelley, was a homemaker. At the age of eight, she had her first job delivering newspapers for The Canton Repository.

Lee attended McKinley High School in Canton, where she was on the swim team. She graduated from high school in 1985 and went to college at Carnegie Mellon University. There she earned both her Bachelor of Arts degree in policy management and a Master of Science degree in public management, receiving her master's degree in 1990.

== Early career ==
After moving to Las Vegas in 1993, Lee became a founding director of the city's chapter of the Inner-City Games, now known as the After-School All-Stars, which conducts after-school programs for children. In 2011, she became the board chair of Communities in Schools of Nevada, a dropout prevention organization.

== U.S. House of Representatives ==
=== Elections ===
==== 2016 ====
Lee ran for the United States House of Representatives in Nevada's 4th congressional district. She lost the primary to Ruben Kihuen by 19 points, placing third behind former state assemblywoman Lucy Flores, who received 25.6% of the vote.

==== 2018 ====
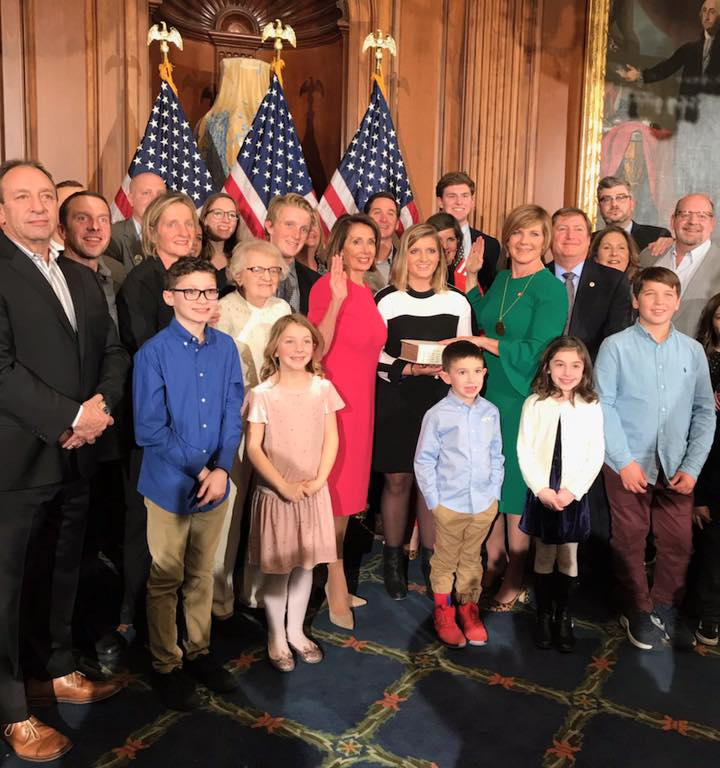
Lee being sworn into the 116th Congress, 2019

Lee ran for Nevada's 3rd congressional district to succeed Jacky Rosen, who retired after one term to run for the United States Senate. Lee won the seven-way primary election with 66.9% of the vote. She defeated Republican nominee Danny Tarkanian in the general election with 52% of the vote.

==== 2020 ====
Lee ran for reelection to a second term. She won the three-way primary election with 82.8% of the vote. She defeated Republican nominee Dan Rodimer in the general election with 48.8% of the vote.

==== 2022 ====
Lee was reelected in the 2022 elections. She defeated Republican April Becker, a lawyer, in the general election with 52% of the vote. She won the general election with 52% of the vote.

==== 2024 ====
Lee was reelected in the 2024 elections. She defeated Republican Drew Johnson, political columnist, policy analyst, and former think tank founder and executive, in the general election with 51% of the vote.

==== 2026 ====
Lee sought a fifth term in 2026. Her main challenger in the Democratic primary was James Lally, a Las Vegas cardiologist. Lee won the June Democratic primary, having received 69.2% of the vote.

The Republican nomination went to Martin O'Donnell, a composer known for his work composing the soundtracks to the video game series Halo. O'Donnell was endorsed by President Trump and Governor Joe Lombardo, and won the four-way Republican primary.

In September 2026, election forecasters described the race as "Lean Democratic," and The Nevada Independent described it as the state's most competitive House district.

On November 3, 2026, Lee was re-elected for the fourth straight time. In contrast to her narrow victory in 2024, Lee won by a margin of nearly 60,000 votes of the over 250,000 votes with about 60 percent of all votes cast.

=== Tenure ===
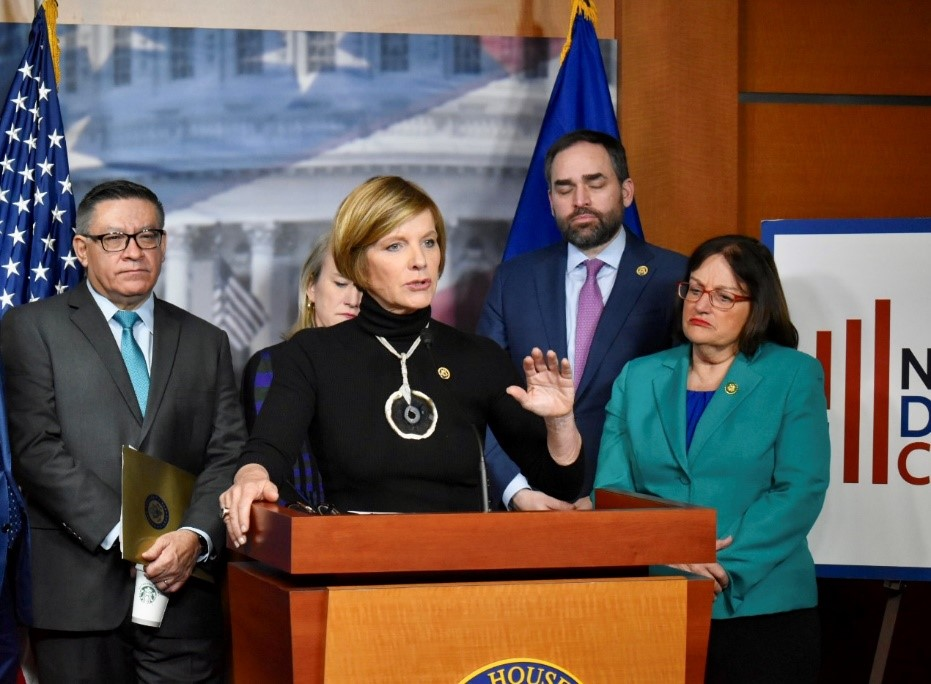
Lee discusses legislation to secure the Mexican–United States border, 2024

Lee was sworn into Congress on January 3, 2019, and was appointed to the Education and Labor and the Veterans' Affairs committees during the 116th Congress. That month, she joined other lawmakers in forgoing her paycheck in solidarity with federal workers affected by the government shutdown of 2019. In February, she co-sponsored the Raise the Wage Act, which aimed to gradually increase the federal minimum wage to $15 per hour by 2024. She also worked with Nevada's congressional delegation to prevent the Yucca Mountain nuclear waste facility from becoming operational. In December, Lee voted in favor of both articles of impeachment against President Donald Trump.

In 2020, Lee sponsored the bipartisan LWCF Permanent Funding Act to secure full and permanent funding for the Land and Water Conservation Fund, which supports outdoor recreation and conservation efforts. In March, she joined Nevada's congressional delegation to push for financial relief for the state's tourism industry, which was hit hard by the COVID-19 pandemic. The following month, they also sought federal aid to Nevada's gaming industry, successfully securing regulatory changes that allowed small gaming businesses to apply for Paycheck Protection Program loans. Shortly after, Full House Resorts, a casino company led by Lee's husband, received $5.6 million in loans; Lee stated she had no role in the decision to apply for the loan despite holding with her husband several million dollars in company stock. In May, Lee voted for the $3 trillion Heroes Act.

In 2021, Lee was appointed to House Appropriations Committee during the 117th congressional session. In June, she supported the SAFE Banking Act, which aimed to allow the cannabis industry access to banking services. During the year, Lee failed to properly disclose over 200 stock trades worth $3.3 million, which her office attributed to clerical errors. An outside legal ethics expert found no evidence of intentional violations of disclosure rules. In November, she voted for the bipartisan Infrastructure Investment and Jobs Act.

In 2022, Lee persuaded the House Democratic Caucus to create a new leadership post, the Battleground Leadership Representative, to give members from the most competitive districts a seat at the caucus leadership table. She initially deferred to Abigail Spanberger for the position, but after she vacated it for her run for Governor of Virginia, Lee then ran for it herself after the 2024 election, defeating Greg Landsman and Kim Schrier. After the 2024 election, she ranked twelfth among House Democrats in how often she broke with her party and she was among the members who most frequently crossed party lines.

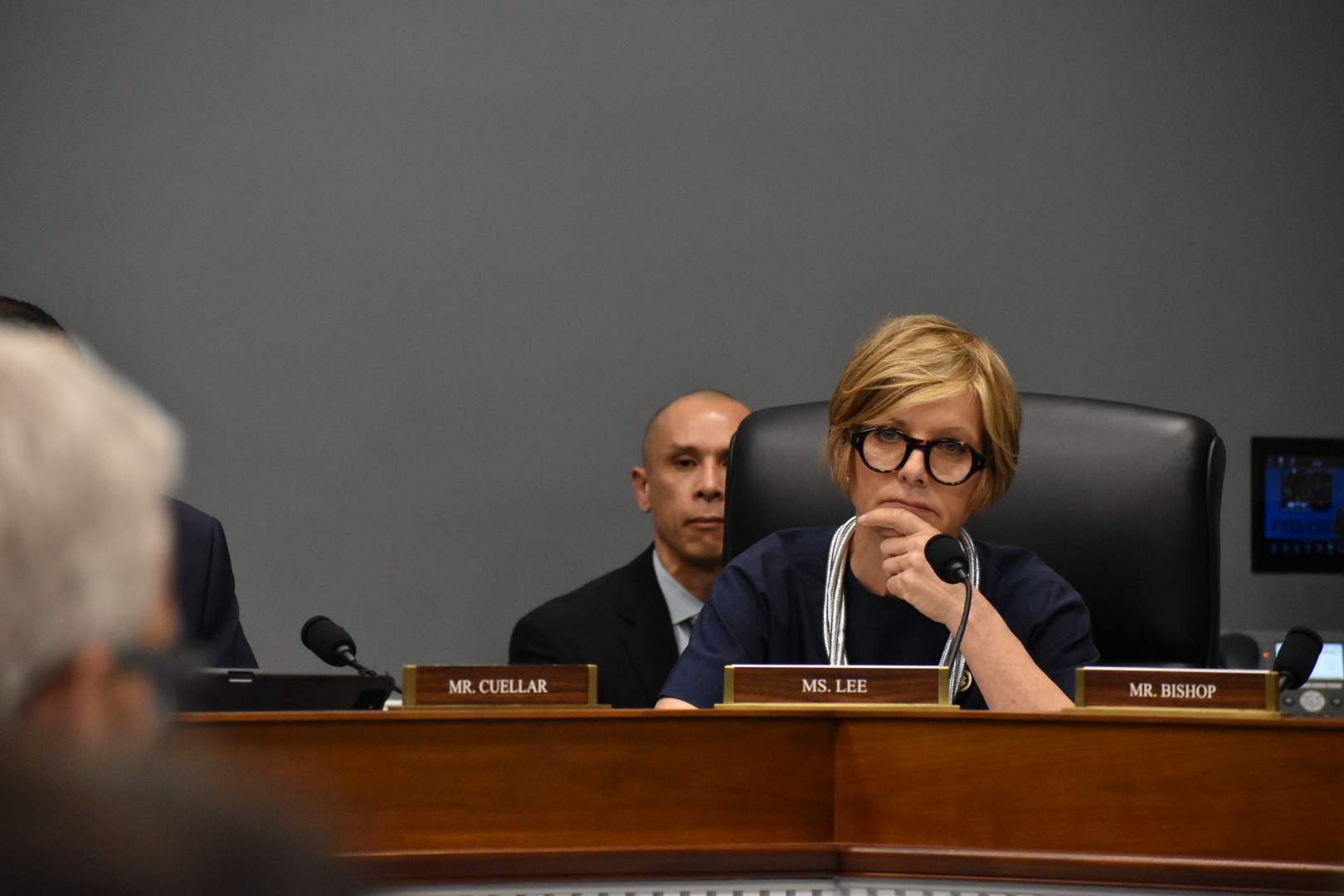
Lee on the Committee on Appropriations, 2024

In 2023, Lee was appointed to the Appropriations and Natural Resources committees during the 118th congressional session. In September, she helped secure federal funding for Nevada’s water infrastructure, including forty million dollars to improve drinking water quality. In April 2024, she co-sponsored the bipartisan Seniors Securing Access to Vital and Essential Prescription Drugs Act.

In 2025, Lee was one of 46 House Democrats who joined all Republicans to vote for the Laken Riley Act. She voted against the One Big Beautiful Bill Act, citing its cuts to Medicaid. In November 2025, she voted against the funding package that ended the 2025 federal government shutdown, criticizing it for not having language that would stop Affordable Care Act premiums from rising.

Lee voted for the House War Powers Resolution measures directing the president to remove American forces from hostilities with Iran, saying the strikes that began in February had come without the approval of Congress. In June 2026, Lee was one of 10 House Democrats to sign onto the pro-capitalist, anti-socialist Promise to America following the Democratic congressional primary victories of three candidates backed by the Democratic Socialists of America.

=== Committee assignments ===
For the 119th Congress:

- Committee on Appropriations
  - Subcommittee on Defense
  - Subcommittee on Energy and Water Development and Related Agencies
- Committee on Natural Resources
  - Subcommittee on Energy and Mineral Resources
  - Subcommittee on Federal Lands

=== Caucus memberships ===
- New Democrat Coalition
- Problem Solvers Caucus (vice chair)
- Congressional Asian Pacific American Caucus
- Congressional Caucus for the Equal Rights Amendment
- Congressional Equality Caucus

== Political positions ==
Lee describes herself as a centrist and she is a member of the moderate New Democrat Coalition and is a vice chair of the bipartisan Problem Solvers Caucus.

=== Reproductive rights ===
Lee supports codifying federal abortion protections and has backed the Women's Health Protection Act and the Right to IVF Act. Lee has said the issue is particularly important to her because her two daughters were conceived through in vitro fertilisation.

=== Economy and taxes ===
Lee opposes raising federal taxes and has also supported eliminating taxes on tips and on overtime pay. She voted against the One Big Beautiful Bill Act, which enacted tipped-income deduction, because of cuts to Medicaid that were also included in the legislation. She supports restricting corporate purchases of single-family homes. She has argued that President Trump's tariffs hurt Nevada by reducing Canadian tourism and raising the cost of building new homes for families.

=== Health care ===
She favors amending the Affordable Care Act instead of repealing it, and supports restoring the enhanced Affordable Care Act premium subsidies that lapsed at the end of 2025, citing it as a major concern during the government shutdown.

=== Immigration ===
Lee supports combining stricter broader enforcement with legal pathways for immigration. She voted for the Laken Riley Act in 2025 but opposes mass deportations.

=== Foreign policy ===
Lee opposes reducing U.S. support for Israel while she has also expressed concern about Israeli actions in Gaza and the West Bank. She opposes the 2026 Iran war and has repeatedly voted for war powers resolutions to end the war there.

== Personal life ==
Lee lives in Las Vegas with her two children. She and her former husband, casino executive Dan Lee, announced their divorce in May 2021. During their marriage, they owned 17 investment properties, and her husband owned a turboprop plane. She is Roman Catholic.

Lee's nephew, Sam Forstag, is the Democratic congressman-elect for Montana's 1st congressional district, having won his election 50% to 47.2% against Republican Aaron Flint.

== Electoral history ==
Democratic primary results (2018)
Party	Candidate	Votes	%
Democratic	Susie Lee	25,474	66.9
Democratic	Michael Weiss	3,115	8.2
Democratic	Eric Stoltz	2,758	7.2
Democratic	Jack Love	2,208	5.8
Democratic	Richard Hart	1,847	4.9
Democratic	Steve Schiffman	1,338	3.5
Democratic	Guy Pinjuv	1,331	3.5
Total votes		38,071	100.0

Nevada's 3rd congressional district, 2018
Party	Candidate	Votes	%
Democratic	Susie Lee	148,501	51.9
Republican	Danny Tarkanian	122,566	42.8
Libertarian	Steve Brown	4,555	1.6
Independent	David Goossen	3,627	1.3
Independent American Party (Nevada)	Harry Vickers	3,481	1.2
Independent	Gil Eisner	1,887	0.7
Independent	Tony Gumina	1,551	0.5
Total votes		286,168	100.0
Democratic hold			

Democratic primary results (2020)
Party	Candidate	Votes	%
Democratic	Susie Lee (incumbent)	49,223	82.8
Democratic	Dennis Sullivan	5,830	9.8
Democratic	Tiffany Watson	4,411	7.4
Total votes		59,464	100.0

Nevada's 3rd congressional district, 2020
Party	Candidate	Votes	%
Democratic	Susie Lee (incumbent)	203,421	48.8
Republican	Dan Rodimer	190,975	45.8
Libertarian	Steve Brown	12,315	2.9
Independent American	Edward Bridges III	10,541	2.5
Total votes		417,252	100.0
Democratic hold			

Democratic primary results (2022)
Party	Candidate	Votes	%
Democratic	Susie Lee (incumbent)	36,919	89.7
Democratic	Randy Hynes	4,239	10.3
Total votes		41,158	100.0

Nevada's 3rd congressional district, 2022
Party	Candidate	Votes	%
Democratic	Susie Lee (incumbent)	131,086	51.9
Republican	April Becker	121,083	48.0
Total votes		252,169	100.0
Democratic hold			

Democratic primary results (2024)
Party	Candidate	Votes	%
Democratic	Susie Lee (incumbent)	33,901	91.8
Democratic	RockAthena Brittain	3,036	8.2
Total votes		36,937	100.0

Nevada's 3rd congressional district, 2024
Party	Candidate	Votes	%
Democratic	Susie Lee (incumbent)	191,304	51.4
Republican	Drew Johnson	181,084	48.6
Total votes		372,388	100.0
Democratic hold			

Democratic primary results (2026)
Party	Candidate	Votes	%
Democratic	Susie Lee (incumbent)	31,712	69.2
Democratic	James Lally	9,324	20.4
Democratic	Terrill Robinson	2,996	6.5
Democratic	Brandon West	1,776	3.9
Total votes		45,808	100.0

== See also ==
- Women in the United States House of Representatives

U.S. House of Representatives
Preceded by Jacky Rosen	Member of the U.S. House of Representatives from Nevada's 3rd congressional district 2019–present	Incumbent
U.S. order of precedence (ceremonial)
Preceded by John Joyce	United States representatives by seniority 211th	Succeeded by Mike Levin
