= Galen Hollenbaugh =

American politician

Member of the Montana House of Representatives from the 81st district
- In office December 2006 – January 5, 2015
- Preceded by: Christine Kaufmann
- Succeeded by: Janet Ellis

Personal details
- Born: Missoula, Montana
- Party: Democratic Party
- Education: University of Montana
- Occupation: campaign manager and chief of staff

Galen Hollenbaugh is a Democratic Party member of the Montana House of Representatives, representing District 81 since his appointment in December 2006. He was appointed by the Lewis and Clark County Commission after the resignation of the incumbent, Christine Kaufmann. Kaufmann had resigned her House seat on being appointed to the Senate to replace Ken Toole, who had resigned from the Senate following his election to the Montana Public Service Commission.
