= Janet Ellis (politician) =

American politician

Member of the Montana Senate from the 41st district
- Incumbent
- Assumed office January 7, 2019
- Preceded by: Mary Caferro

Member of the Montana House of Representatives from the 81st district
- In office January 5, 2015 – January 7, 2019
- Preceded by: Galen Hollenbaugh
- Succeeded by: Mary Caferro

Personal details
- Born: 1956 (age 69–70) Columbus, Ohio
- Party: Democratic Party
- Spouse: Jim Hansen
- Education: University of Montana

Janet Ellis is an American politician and a Democratic member of the Montana Senate. She served in the Montana House of Representatives from 2015 to 2019.
