= 2026 Montana Initiative 194 =

Referendum on campaign finance

- November 3, 2026
- I-194, if passed, limits the powers of artificial persons to those powers necessary or convenient as provided by law. These powers must exclude contributing anything of value to candidate elections, supporting or opposing political parties, or supporting or opposing state or local ballot issues. Artificial persons include non-profits, trusts, partnerships, corporations, trade associations, or unincorporated associations and includes all such entities doing business in Montana. Any violation of I-194 is punished by forfeiting all privileges to do business in Montana. Those privileges may be, but are not automatically, restored upon disgorgement and certification of compliance with I-194. I-194 does not apply to the distribution of news, commentary, or editorial content. I-194 also does not apply to the state of Montana, political subdivisions, individuals, political committees, or public corporations.
- Reporting: 99% as of November 13, 2026 9:28 a.m. MST
- Outcome: Passed

Results
Choice	Votes	%
Yes	307,039	65.57%
No	161,247	34.43%
County results
Yes
70–80%
60–70%
50–60%
No
60–70%
50–60%

Initiative 194, also known as The Montana Plan, is an initiative in Montana that appeared on the November 3, 2026 general election ballot. The initiative would prohibit "artificial persons", such as non-profits, trusts, partnerships, corporations, and trade associations, from spending money on elections and political parties. It passed with 65% approval and enter into effect on January 1, 2027.

== Background ==
The Corrupt Practice Act of 1912, which banned corporate spending in candidate elections, was enacted following a Montana citizen initiative, which passed with 76% voter approval, in November 1912. In 1996, Montana Initiative 125, which barred corporate spending in ballot issue campaigns, was passed; it was struck down in 2000 by the 9th Circuit Court of Appeals in Montana Chamber of Commerce v. Argenbright.

In 2010, the United States Supreme Court issued in Citizens United v. FEC that corporations have a right to spend money on political ads as long as they do not coordinate directly with a campaign. In December 2011, the Montana Supreme Court issued a ruling in Western Tradition Partnership v. Attorney General that upheld The Corrupt Practice Act of 1912, stating that Montana had "unique and compelling interests to protect through preservation of [The Corrupt Practice Act of 1912]". In June 2012, the United States Supreme Court issued a ruling in American Tradition Partnership v. Bullock that largely struck down The Corrupt Practice Act of 1912. In November 2012, Montana Initiative 166, which required state lawmakers to implement policy prohibiting corporate campaign contributions in elections and stating that corporations do not have constitutional rights, was passed with 75% voter approval. The initiative was overturned in 2013 in Rickert v. McCulloch. Following Citizens United v. FEC, independent political spending in Montana increased from $33,000 in 2008 to $162 million in 2024.

== History ==
In 2024, Center for American Progress fellow Tom Moore drafted a white paper on the measure's legal architecture and shared it with former Montana Commissioner of Political Practices Jeff Mangan. In April 2025, Mangan established the Transparent Election Initiative, a group focused on supporting the initiative. In June 2025, the ballot measure, based on Moore's draft white paper and titled "The Montana Plan", was released. In September 2025, Moore released the white paper on the measure. In October 2025, Montana attorney general Austin Knudsen blocked the initiative, arguing that it violated the one-subject requirement for ballot questions. In January 2026, the Montana Supreme Court unanimously ruled in favor of Knudsen's ruling. Following the court ruling, the initiative was resubmitted as statutory initiative, which, if passed, would enshrine the initiative in state law and not the Constitution of Montana. On March 11, 2026, the Transparent Election Initiative began collecting signatures for the initiative. In March 2026, multiple industry groups and chambers of commerce filed a lawsuit aiming to block the initiative; the lawsuit was dismissed by the Montana Supreme Court on March 31, 2026. Attorney general Knudsen blocked the initiative in March 2026, again arguing that it violated the one-subject requirement. The Montana Supreme Court rejected Knudsen's objection and allowed the initiative to proceed in April 2026.

On June 16, 2026, 50,000 signatures for the initiative were submitted to the Montana secretary of state, surpassing the 30,121 signatures required to qualify for the ballot. The initiative was certified for the November 2026 ballot by Montana secretary of state Christi Jacobsen on August 19, 2026. The measure was approved by voters in November 2026 and will enter into effect on January 1, 2027. On November 3, 2026, several groups filed a lawsuit against the measure.

As of September 2026, legislation or ballot initiatives modeled after Initiative 194 have been introduced in 32 states. In May 2026, Hawaii Act 11, modeled after Initiative 194, was signed into law.

== Contents ==
On the ballot, the following was shown to voters:

I-194, if passed, limits the powers of artificial persons to those powers necessary or convenient as provided by law. These powers must exclude contributing anything of value to candidate elections, supporting or opposing political parties, or supporting or opposing state or local ballot issues. Artificial persons include non-profits, trusts, partnerships, corporations, trade associations, or unincorporated associations and includes all such entities doing business in Montana. Any violation of I-194 is punished by forfeiting all privileges to do business in Montana. Those privileges may be, but are not automatically, restored upon disgorgement and certification of compliance with I-194. I-194 does not apply to the distribution of news, commentary, or editorial content. I-194 also does not apply to the state of Montana, political subdivisions, individuals, political committees, or public corporations.

== Campaign ==
=== Support ===
Supporters of the initiative have described it as a constraint on dark money and corporate spending in elections. On its legality, supporters have described it as a workaround to the Citizens United v. FEC ruling by targeting corporate powers instead of corporate rights. Supporters have cited the reservation clause established by Dartmouth College v. Woodward which allows states to amend corporate charters.

=== Opposition ===
Opponents of the initiative have argued that the initiative is illegal, citing Citizens United v. FEC. Lawsuits filed against the initiative accused it of violating the right to free speech. Montana Chamber of Commerce president Todd O'Hair stated that the initiative would "silence the Montana business community". Capital University Law School professor Bradley Smith stated that the initiative violated the First Amendment "by calling political spending a corporate power instead of a right". The Montana attorney general's office stated that the measure could cause "significant material harm" to businesses.

Some critics of the measure have noted that the measure does not restrict political spending by individuals.

== Endorsements ==
Yes

Executive branch officials

- Pete Buttigieg, former United States Secretary of Transportation (2021-2025) (Democratic)
- Robert Reich, former United States Secretary of Labor (1993-1997) (Democratic)

U.S. senators

- Jon Tester, Montana (2007-2025) (Democratic)

U.S. representatives

- Alexandria Ocasio-Cortez, NY-14 (2019-present) (Democratic)

Statewide officials

- Steve Bullock, former Governor of Montana (2013-2021) (Democratic)
- Marc Racicot, former Governor of Montana (1993-2001) (Republican)

Local officials

- Rina Fontana Moore, Cascade County clerk and recorder (Democratic)

Individuals

- Gary Buchanan, former Montana Department of Commerce director and candidate for MT-2 in the 2022 elections (Independent)
- Sam Forstag, labor union leader and candidate for MT-1 in the 2026 elections (Democratic)

Organizations

- End Citizens United
- Issue One
- League of Women Voters Montana
No

Individuals

- Bradley Smith, Capital University Law School professor

Organizations

- Americans for Prosperity
- Montana Chamber of Commerce

Political parties

- Montana Republican Party

== Polling ==
Poll source	Date(s) administered	Sample size	Margin of error	Phrasing	Support	Oppose	Undecided
Issue One/YouGov	October 7–20, 2025	707 (registered voters)	±5.8%	"As you may know, there is a new effort to eliminate corporate spending in Montana elections that has been submitted as a ballot measure for the 2026 election. The measure description submitted to the Montana Secretary of State reads: A constitutional initiative that would add a new section to Article XIII of the Montana Constitution to define the powers of artificial persons, including corporations, as only those the constitution expressly grants and provide that artificial persons have no power to spend money or anything of value on elections or ballot issues. The initiative affirms that the people of Montana did not intend for artificial persons to have the power to spend on elections or ballot issues. This act provides that actions beyond those expressly granted powers are void. The initiative provides that political committees may be granted the power to spend on elections and ballot issues. It allows enforcement through forfeiture of state-conferred privileges. The initiative includes a severability clause that ensures that valid portions of the initiative remain effective if other parts are invalidated. If the 2026 election were being held today, would you vote… [for or against the measure]"	74%	11%	15%
