= Sam Forstag =

American politician, smokejumper (born 1994)

- Forstag in 2026

Member-elect of the U.S. House of Representatives from Montana's 1st district
- Assuming office January 3, 2027
- Succeeding: Ryan Zinke

Personal details
- Born: Samuel Kelley Forstag; May 23, 1994 (age 32) Ohio, U.S.
- Party: Democratic
- Relatives: Susie Lee (aunt)
- Education: University of Montana (BA)
- Website: Campaign website

Samuel Kelley Forstag (born May 23, 1994) is an American labor union leader, politician, and former smokejumper who is the U.S. representative-elect for Montana's 1st congressional district.

== Early life and education ==
Forstag was born in Ohio, and raised mostly by a single mother who worked as an ICU nurse in Portland, Oregon. He graduated from Jesuit High School. He was raised Catholic, though his father's family is Jewish of Latvian origin.

Forstag moved to Montana in 2012, and worked multiple jobs to pay for his undergraduate education at the University of Montana, where he studied philosophy and political science and was elected student body president.

== Career ==
After graduating in 2017, Forstag took a job as a wildland firefighter to pay off student loan debt, intending to apply to law school. Instead he served as a wildland firefighter for eight years, including four years as a smokejumper. During the off-seasons, he worked as an organizer and lobbyist for the Montana chapter of the American Civil Liberties Union and for lobbying group Central House Strategies, where he represented the city of Missoula. In 2025, he became vice president of the National Federation of Federal Employees (NFFE) Local 60, where he represents approximately 800 U.S. Forest Service workers.

== 2026 U.S. House of Representatives campaign ==
As the Democratic Party nominee in the 2026 election for the Montana 1st congressional district in the U.S. House of Representatives, Forstag faced Republican nominee Aaron Flint and Libertarian nominee Nick Sheedy. On November 3, 2026, he defeated Flint and Sheedy, becoming the first Democrat elected to the U.S. House from Montana since Pat Williams in 1994.

Forstag's congressional campaign focused on protecting public land, alongside economic issues such as housing and health care affordability. He also emphasized his support for the right to bear arms. He was endorsed by union groups and national progressive leaders, including Senator Bernie Sanders and Representative Alexandria Ocasio-Cortez. Forstag was also endorsed by the Blue Dog PAC, a coalition of moderate Democrats, and by his aunt, Representative Susie Lee.

== Personal life ==
Forstag resides in Missoula with his longtime partner, Allie Hay, the director of philanthropy for Planned Parenthood's Montana chapter.

U.S. House of Representatives
Preceded by Ryan Zinke	Member of the U.S. House of Representatives from Montana's 1st congressional district Taking office 2027	Elect
