= 2026 United States House of Representatives elections in Montana =

2026 United House of Representatives elections in Montana
- November 3, 2026

Both Montana seats to the United States House of Representatives
	Majority party	Minority party
Party	Republican	Democratic
Last election	2	0
Seats won	1	1
Seat change	▼1	▲1
Popular vote	253,026	206,311
Percentage	51.82%	42.25%
Swing	▼6.68%	▲2.60%

Republican hold
Democratic gain
Republican
40–50%
50–60%
60–70%
70–80%
80–90%
Democratic
40–50%
50–60%
60–70%

The 2026 United States House of Representatives elections in Montana were held on November 3, 2026, to elect the two U.S. representatives from the state of Montana, one from each of the state's congressional districts. The elections coincided with other elections to the House of Representatives, elections to the United States Senate, and various state and local elections. The primary elections took place on June 2, 2026. Montana, Maine, and Wisconsin will be the three states with evenly split congressional delegations following the 2026 House of Representatives elections, (1 - 1, 1 - 1, and 4 - 4 respectively.).

This was the first time Democrats won a U.S. House election in Montana since 1994.

== District 1 ==
2026 Montana's 1st congressional district election

Nominee	Sam Forstag	Aaron Flint
Party	Democratic	Republican
Popular vote	135,132	124,854
Percentage	50.5%	46.6%
- County results Forstag: 50–60% 60–70% Flint: 50–60% 60–70% 70–80%
U.S. Representative before election
Ryan Zinke
Republican
Elected U.S. Representative
Sam Forstag
Democratic

The 1st district is based in western Montana, including Missoula, Bozeman, Butte, and Kalispell. The incumbent is Republican Ryan Zinke, who was re-elected with 52.3% of the vote in 2024. On March 2, 2026, Zinke announced that he would retire once his present term ends.

=== Republican primary ===
==== Nominee ====
- Aaron Flint, veteran and radio host

===== Eliminated in primary =====
- Ray Curtis, educator
- Christi Jacobsen, Secretary of State of Montana (2021–present)
- Albert Olszewski, former state senator (2017–2021), Flathead County Republican Central Committee chairman, candidate for U.S. Senate in 2018, governor in 2020, and this seat in 2022

===== Withdrawn =====
- Ryan Zinke, incumbent U.S. representative (endorsed Flint)

===== Declined =====
- Matt Regier, president of the Montana Senate (2025–present) from the 5th district (2025–present)
- Denny Rehberg, former U.S. representative (2001–2013)

==== Endorsements ====
Aaron Flint

Executive branch officials

- Donald Trump, president of the United States (2017–2021, 2025–present) (previously endorsed Zinke)

U.S. senators

- Tim Sheehy, Montana (2025–present)

U.S. representatives

- Troy Downing, MT-02 (2025–present)
- Richard Hudson, NC-09 (2013–present)
- Mike Johnson, speaker of the House (2023–present) from LA-04 (2017–present)
- Jim Jordan, OH-04 (2007–present)
- Lisa McClain, MI-09 (2021–present)
- Steve Scalise, House majority leader (2023-present) from LA-01 (2008-present)
- Ryan Zinke, MT-01 (2023–present)

Statewide officials

- James Brown, state auditor of Montana (2025–present)
- Greg Gianforte, governor of Montana (2021–present)
- Austin Knudsen, attorney general of Montana (2021–present)

State legislators

- Brandon Ler, speaker of the Montana State House (2025–present) from the 35th district (2021-present)

Organizations

- NRCC MAGA Majority
- U.S. Chamber of Commerce
Ryan Zinke (withdrawn)

Executive branch officials

- ~~Donald Trump, president of the United States (2017–2021, 2025–present)~~ (endorsed Flint after Zinke withdrew)

==== Fundraising ====
Campaign finance reports as of May 13, 2026
Candidate	Raised	Spent	Cash on hand
Aaron Flint (R)	$677,089	$292,415	$384,673
Christi Jacobson (R)	$447,271	$352,505	$94,766
Albert Olszewski (R)	$411,338	$317,276	$104,010
Source: Federal Election Commission

==== Results ====
Primary results by county: Flint: 40–50%; 50–60%; Jacobsen: 40–50%

Republican primary results
Party	Candidate	Votes	%
Republican	Aaron Flint	41,170	50.1
Republican	Christi Jacobsen	18,877	23.0
Republican	Al Olszewski	16,686	20.3
Republican	Ray Curtis	5,479	6.7
Total votes		82,212	100.0

=== Democratic primary ===
==== Candidates ====
===== Nominee =====
- Sam Forstag, smokejumper and union leader

===== Eliminated in primary =====
- Ryan Busse, author, former vice president of sales at Kimber Manufacturing, and nominee for governor in 2024
- Russell Cleveland, education consultant
- Matt Rains, rancher and candidate for Montana's at-large congressional district in 2020

===== Declined =====
- Brian Schweitzer, former governor of Montana (2005–2013) (endorsed Busse, then Forstag)

==== Endorsements ====
Ryan Busse

U.S. senators

- Ruben Gallego, Arizona (2025–present)

Statewide officials

- Brian Schweitzer, former governor of Montana (2005–2013)

State Legislators

- Susan Webber, state senator from the 8th district (2019–present) (co-endorsement with Forstag and Cleveland)

Organizations

- League of Conservation Voters Action Fund
Russell Cleveland

State legislators

- Susan Webber, state senator from the 8th district (2019–present) (co-endorsement with Busse and Forstag)

Labor unions

- Union of American Physicians and Dentists

Individuals

- Josh Hutcherson, actor

Organizations

- Indivisible Missoula
Sam Forstag

U.S. senators

- Bernie Sanders, Vermont (2007–present) (Independent)

U.S. representatives

- Greg Casar, TX-35 (2023–present)
- Maxwell Frost, FL-10 (2023–present)
- Pramila Jayapal, WA-07 (2017–present)
- Susie Lee, NV-03 (2019–present) (candidate's aunt)
- Alexandria Ocasio-Cortez, NY-14 (2019–present)
- Jamie Raskin, MD-08 (2017-present)

State legislators

- Kim Abbott, former minority leader of the Montana House of Representatives (2021–2025) from the 83rd district (2017–present)
- Geraldine Custer, former state representative from the 39th district (2015–2023) (Republican)
- Susan Webber, state senator from the 8th district (2019–present) (co-endorsement with Busse and Cleveland)

Labor unions

- American Federation of Government Employees
- Association of Flight Attendants
- International Association of Fire Fighters, Locals 96 (Butte), and 271 (Missoula)
- Montana AFL-CIO
- Montana Alliance for Retired Americans
- Montana Federation of Public Employees
- Montana State Conference of Electrical Workers
- National Federation of Federal Employees
- SEIU 775

Organizations

- Congressional Progressive Caucus PAC
- Our Revolution
- Progressive Democrats of America
Matt Rains

State legislators

- Jill Cohenour, state representative from the 83th district (2003–2011, 2023–present)
- Paul Tuss, state representative from the 27th district (2023–present)

==== Fundraising ====
Campaign finance reports as of May 13, 2026
Candidate	Raised	Spent	Cash on hand
Ryan Busse (D)	$702,447	$551,915	$150,531
Russell Cleveland (D)	$418,450	$363,895	$54,554
Samuel Forstag (D)	$694,569	$533,132	$161,437
Matt Rains (D)	$265,119	$230,813	$34,305
Source: Federal Election Commission

==== Polling ====
Poll source	Date(s) administered	Sample size (Note: Key: A – all adults RV – registered voters LV – likely voters V – unclear)	Margin of error	Ryan Busse	Russell Cleveland	Sam Forstag	Matt Rains	Undecided
Tulchin Research (D) (Note: Poll sponsored by Busse's campaign)	March 28 – April 1, 2026	400 (LV)	–	35%	20%	13%	5%	27%

==== Results ====
Primary results by county: Forstag: 30–40%; 40–50%; Busse: 30–40%; 40–50%; Cleveland: 30–40%; 50–60%

Democratic primary results
Party	Candidate	Votes	%
Democratic	Sam Forstag	26,276	37.3
Democratic	Ryan Busse	23,196	33.1
Democratic	Russell Cleveland	15,238	21.7
Democratic	Matt Rains	5,518	7.9
Total votes		70,228	100.0

=== Libertarian primary ===
==== Candidates ====
===== Nominee =====
- Nick Sheedy, genealogist and research historian

==== Results ====
Libertarian primary results
Party	Candidate	Votes	%
Libertarian	Nick Sheedy	1,202	100.0
Total votes		1,202	100.0

=== Independents ===
==== Candidates ====
===== Declared =====
- Kimberly Persico (Independent)

=== General election ===
==== Predictions ====
Source	Ranking	As of
Decision Desk HQ	Tossup	October 30, 2026
The Cook Political Report	Tossup	October 16, 2026
Inside Elections	Tossup	October 29, 2026
Sabato's Crystal Ball	Lean D (flip)	November 2, 2026

==== Post-primary endorsements ====
Sam Forstag (D)

U.S. senators

- Jon Tester, Montana (2007–2025)

U.S. representatives

- Adam Gray, CA-13 (2025–present)

Statewide officials

- Steve Bullock, former governor of Montana (2013–2021)
- Marc Racicot, former governor of Montana (1993–2001) and former chair of the Republican National Committee (2001–2003) (Republican)

State legislators

- Brian Putnam, former state representative from the 9th district (2021–2023) (Republican)

Labor unions

- National Education Association
- United Auto Workers

Organizations

- Blue Dog PAC
- DCCC Red to Blue
- End Citizens United
- Independent Leadership Council
- J Street
- Jewish Democratic Council of America
- MoveOn
- Peace Action
- Reproductive Freedom for All

==== Fundraising ====
Campaign finance reports as of October 14, 2026
Candidate	Raised	Spent	Cash on hand
Aaron Flint (R)	$2,856,139	$2,447,986	$408,153
Sam Forstag (D)	$4,312,110	$3,585,985	$726,126
Source: Federal Election Commission

==== Polling ====
Poll source	Date(s) administered	Sample size	Margin of error	Aaron Flint (R)	Sam Forstag (D)	Nick Sheedy (L)	Undecided
Emerson College (Note: Poll sponsored by Poll Vault, a Substack newsletter authored by Sean Trende)	October 31 – November 1, 2026	311 (LV)	–	49%	49%	3%	–
RedBox Research (D) (Note: Poll sponsored by A Fight Worth Having)	October 20–23, 2026	754 (LV)	± 4.6%	48%	46%	2%	4% (Note: "Prefer not to answer" with 1%)
Montana State University Billings	October 5–21, 2026	–	± 5.78%	32%	49%	4%	11%
Emerson College (Note: Poll sponsored by Poll Vault)	October 12–14, 2026	329 (LV)	–	46%	50%	4%	
Public Policy Polling (D) (Note: Poll sponsored by the House Majority PAC, which is focused on electing Democrats to the U.S. House of Representatives)	October 12–14, 2026	541 (LV)	–	45%	48%	–	7%
American Pulse (Note: Poll sponsored by the NonStop Local)	September 19–24, 2026	314 (LV)	—	46%	45%	5%	3%
Impact Research (D) (Note: Poll sponsored by Forstag's campaign)	September 20–23, 2026	500 (LV)	± 3.4%	44%	47%	2%	7%
Public Policy Polling (D) (Note: Poll sponsored by The Bench, which supports Forstag)	September 9–10, 2026	536 (RV)	± 4.2%	43%	45%	–	12%
Rutgers University Eagleton Institute of Politics (Note: Poll sponsored by the Montana Free Press)	August 27 – September 7, 2026	375 (RV)	± 6.0%	42%	41%	5%	11% (Note: "Someone else" with 9%; "Would not vote" with 2%)
Impact Research (D)	June 22–25, 2026	500 (LV)	± 4.4%	44%	44%	5%	7%
Upswing Research (D) (Note: Poll sponsored by 314 Action)	April 30 – May 5, 2026	401 (LV)	± 4.9%	48%	43%	–	9%

Hypothetical polling

Aaron Flint vs. Matt Rains

Poll source	Date(s) administered	Sample size	Margin of error	Aaron Flint (R)	Matt Rains (D)	Undecided
Upswing Research (D)	April 30 – May 5, 2026	401 (LV)	± 4.9%	47%	43%	10%

Ryan Zinke vs. Ryan Busse

Poll source	Date(s) administered	Sample size	Margin of error	Ryan Zinke (R)	Ryan Busse (D)	Undecided
Peak Insights (R) (Note: Poll conducted by Leadership in Action PAC, which supports Zinke)	January 12–15, 2026	400 (LV)	± 5.0%	47%	41%	12%
Tulchin Research (D)	November 22–25, 2025	424 (LV)	± 5.0%	43%	47%	10%

Ryan Zinke vs. Sam Forstag

Poll source	Date(s) administered	Sample size	Margin of error	Ryan Zinke (R)	Sam Forstag (D)	Undecided
Peak Insights (R)	January 12–15, 2026	400 (LV)	± 5.0%	48%	38%	14%

Generic Republican vs. generic Democrat

Poll source	Date(s) administered	Sample size	Margin of error	Generic Republican	Generic Democrat	Undecided
Public Policy Polling (D)	September 9–10, 2026	536 (RV)	± 4.2%	48%	44%	12%

==== Results ====
2026 Montana's 1st congressional district election
Party	Candidate	Votes	%	±%
Democratic	Sam Forstag	135,132	50.5	+5.9
Republican	Aaron Flint	124,854	46.6	−5.7
Libertarian	Nick Sheedy	7,721	2.9	−0.2
Total votes		267,707	100	
Democratic gain from Republican				

==== By county ====
County	Sam Forstag Democratic		Aaron Flint Republican		Nick Sheedy Libertarian		Margin		Total
County	#	%	#	%	#	%	#	%	Total
Beaverhead	1,443	31.85%	2,933	64.73%	155	3.42%	-1,490	-32.88%	4,531
Deer Lodge	2,278	56.69%	1,567	39.00%	173	4.31%	711	10.21%	4,018
Flathead	20,052	37.95%	31,308	59.25%	1,481	2.80%	-11,256	-21.30%	52,841
Gallatin	34,439	59.60%	21,922	37.94%	1,426	2.47%	12,517	21.66%	57,787
Glacier	2,644	65.79%	1,230	30.60%	145	3.61%	1,414	35.19%	4,019
Granite	620	33.84%	1,146	62.55%	66	3.60%	-526	-28.71%	1,832
Lake	6,141	43.74%	7,471	53.21%	428	3.05%	-1,330	-9.47%	14,040
Lincoln	2,566	25.76%	7,042	70.69%	354	3.55%	-4,476	-44.93%	9,962
Madison	1,728	32.84%	3,359	63.84%	175	3.32%	-1,631	-31.00%	5,262
Mineral	729	30.29%	1,547	64.27%	131	5.44%	-818	-33.98%	2,407
Missoula	42,292	68.37%	18,235	29.48%	1,332	2.15%	24,057	38.89%	61,859
Pondera (part)	227	33.73%	424	63.00%	22	3.27%	-197	-29.27%	673
Powell	707	27.07%	1,771	67.80%	134	5.16%	-1,064	-40.73%	2,612
Ravalli	8,460	34.76%	15,061	61.89%	814	3.34%	-6,601	-27.13%	24,335
Sanders	1,662	24.91%	4,705	70.53%	304	4.56%	-3,043	-45.62%	6,671
Silver Bow	9,144	61.54%	5,133	34.55%	581	3.91%	4,011	26.99%	14,858
Totals	135,132	50.48%	124,854	46.64%	7,721	2.88%	10,278	3.84%	267,707

== District 2 ==
2026 Montana's 2nd congressional district election
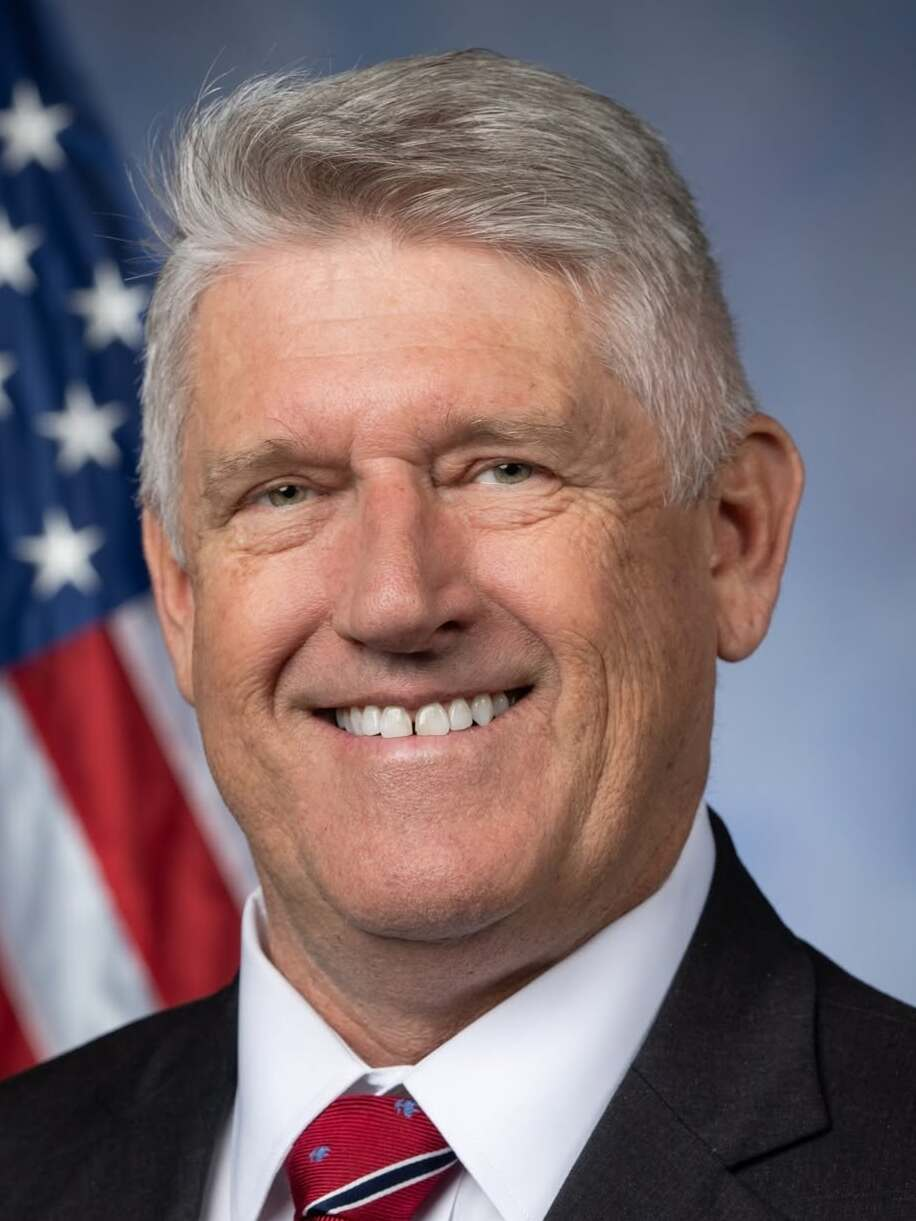

Nominee	Troy Downing	Brian Miller	Michael Eisenhauer
Party	Republican	Democratic	Independent
Popular vote	128,172	71,179	17,199
Percentage	58.1%	32.3%	7.8%
- County results Downing: 40–50% 50–60% 60–70% 70–80% 80–90% Miller: 40–50%
U.S. Representative before election
Troy Downing
Republican
Elected U.S. Representative
Troy Downing
Republican

The 2nd district is based in eastern Montana, including Billings, Great Falls, and Helena. The incumbent is Republican Troy Downing, who was elected with 65.7% of the vote in 2024.

=== Republican primary ===
==== Candidates ====
===== Nominee =====
- Troy Downing, incumbent U.S. representative

==== Endorsements ====
Troy Downing

Executive branch officials

- Donald Trump, president of the United States (2017–2021, 2025–present)

Organizations

- AIPAC

==== Fundraising ====
Campaign finance reports as of May 13, 2026
Candidate	Raised	Spent	Cash on hand
Troy Downing (R)	$1,794,757	$1,512,717	$393,570
Source: Federal Election Commission

==== Results ====
Republican primary results
Party	Candidate	Votes	%
Republican	Troy Downing (incumbent)	82,088	100.0
Total votes		82,088	100.0

=== Democratic primary ===
==== Candidates ====
===== Nominee =====
- Brian Miller, attorney

===== Eliminated in primary =====
- Sam Lux, horse farrier
- Jonathan Windy Boy, state senator from the 16th district (2009–2017, 2025–present)

==== Fundraising ====
Campaign finance reports as of May 13, 2026
Candidate	Raised	Spent	Cash on hand
Sam Lux (D)	$9,611	$8,845	$943
Brian Miller (D)	$15,220	$9,390	$1,821
Source: Federal Election Commission

==== Results ====
Democratic primary results
Party	Candidate	Votes	%
Democratic	Brian Miller	24,033	55.7
Democratic	Sam Lux	11,759	27.2
Democratic	Jonathan Windy Boy	7,484	17.2
Total votes		43,276	100.0

=== Libertarian primary ===
==== Candidates ====
===== Nominee =====
- Patrick McCracken

==== Results ====
Libertarian primary results
Party	Candidate	Votes	%
Libertarian	Patrick McCracken	1,846	100.0
Total votes		1,846	100.0

=== Independents ===
==== Candidates ====
===== Declared =====
- Michael Eisenhauer, cardiologist

==== Fundraising ====
Campaign finance reports as of May 13, 2026
Candidate	Raised	Spent	Cash on hand
Michael Eisenhauer (I)	$259,927	$124,165	$135,762
Source: Federal Election Commission

=== General election ===
==== Predictions ====
Source	Ranking	As of
Decision Desk HQ	Safe R	July 14, 2026
The Cook Political Report	Solid R	June 13, 2025
Inside Elections	Solid R	June 13, 2025
Sabato's Crystal Ball	Safe R	June 13, 2025

==== Post-primary endorsements ====
Troy Downing (R)

Organizations

- U.S. Chamber of Commerce
Michael Eisenhauer (I)

U.S. senators

- Jon Tester, Montana (2007–2025) (Democratic)

Labor unions

- Montana AFL-CIO

Political parties

- Forward Party

==== Fundraising ====
Campaign finance reports as of September 30, 2026
Candidate	Raised	Spent	Cash on hand
Troy Downing (R)	$2,697,257	$1,967,800	$840,987
Brian Miller (D)	$30,654	$27,089	$2,129
Michael Eisenhauer (I)	$347,728	$322,017	$25,711
Source: Federal Election Commission

==== Polling ====
Poll source	Date(s) administered	Sample size	Margin of error	Troy Downing (R)	Brian Miller (D)	Michael Eisenhauer (I)	Other	Undecided
Montana State University Billings	October 5–21, 2026	–	± 5.24%	29%	18%	15%	2% (Note: Patrick McCracken (L) with 2%)	31%
Rutgers University Eagleton Institute of Politics	August 27 – September 7, 2026	470 (RV)	± 5.8%	48%	26%	9%	5% (Note: Patrick McCracken (L) with 5%)	12%

==== Results ====
2026 Montana's 2nd congressional district election
Party	Candidate	Votes	%	±%
Republican	Troy Downing (incumbent)	128,172	58.1%	−7.6%
Democratic	Brian Miller	71,179	32.3%	−1.6%
Independent	Michael Eisenhauer	17,199	7.8%	N/A
Libertarian	Patrick McCracken	4,046	1.8%	N/A
Total votes		220,596	100%	
Republican hold				

==== By county ====
County	Troy Downing Republican		Brian Miller Democratic		Michael Eisenhauer Independent		Patrick McCracken Libertarian		Margin		Total
County	#	%	#	%	#	%	#	%	#	%	Total
Big Horn	1,535	44.20%	1,672	48.14%	215	6.19%	51	1.47%	-137	-3.94%	3,473
Blaine	1,080	48.54%	972	43.69%	130	5.84%	43	1.93%	108	4.85%	2,225
Broadwater	2,707	72.79%	647	17.40%	281	7.56%	84	2.26%	2,060	55.39%	3,719
Carbon	3,681	60.03%	1,834	29.91%	503	8.20%	114	1.86%	1,847	30.12%	6,132
Carter	608	88.37%	40	5.81%	25	3.63%	15	2.18%	568	82.56%	688
Cascade	15,693	53.29%	10,584	35.94%	2,706	9.19%	463	1.57%	5,109	17.35%	29,446
Chouteau	1,396	61.28%	687	30.16%	159	6.98%	36	1.58%	709	31.12%	2,278
Custer	2,918	68.07%	1,056	24.63%	229	5.34%	84	1.96%	2,919	51.23%	4,287
Daniels	652	80.89%	109	13.52%	37	4.59%	8	0.99%	543	67.37%	806
Dawson	2,489	73.90%	663	19.69%	164	4.87%	52	1.54%	1,826	54.21%	3,368
Fallon	993	85.16%	104	8.92%	61	5.23%	8	0.69%	889	76.24%	1,166
Fergus	3,780	70.48%	1,148	21.41%	324	6.04%	111	2.07%	2,632	49.07%	5,363
Garfield	574	88.58%	39	6.02%	23	3.55%	12	1.85%	539	82.56%	648
Golden Valley	318	81.75%	49	12.60%	15	3.86%	7	1.80%	269	69.15%	389
Hill	2,607	50.90%	1,940	37.88%	467	9.12%	108	2.11%	667	13.02%	5,122
Jefferson	4,227	62.09%	1,952	28.67%	499	7.33%	130	1.91%	2,275	33.42%	6,808
Judith Basin	864	75.52%	171	14.95%	75	6.56%	34	2.97%	693	60.57%	1,144
Lewis and Clark	15,902	45.73%	14,681	42.22%	3,477	10.00%	711	2.04%	1,221	3.51%	34,771
Liberty	552	72.06%	161	21.02%	41	5.35%	12	1.57%	391	51.04%	766
McCone	710	83.14%	90	10.54%	43	5.04%	11	1.29%	620	72.60%	854
Meagher	678	73.22%	154	16.63%	75	8.10%	19	2.05%	524	56.59%	926
Musselshell	1,963	81.49%	299	12.41%	102	4.23%	45	1.87%	1,664	69.08%	2,409
Park	4,427	46.34%	4,082	42.73%	852	8.92%	193	2.02%	345	3.61%	9,554
Petroleum	217	86.11%	18	7.14%	13	5.16%	4	1.59%	199	78.97%	252
Phillips	1,335	78.58%	246	14.48%	95	5.59%	23	1.35%	1,089	64.10%	1,699
Pondera (part)	1,056	68.35%	356	23.04%	104	6.73%	29	1.88%	700	45.31%	1,545
Powder River	717	81.94%	95	10.86%	49	5.60%	14	1.60%	622	71.08%	875
Prairie	452	77.66%	93	15.98%	30	5.15%	7	1.20%	359	61.68%	582
Richland	2,835	77.65%	568	15.56%	192	5.26%	56	1.53%	2,267	62.09%	3,651
Roosevelt	1,226	48.10%	1,159	45.47%	112	4.39%	52	2.04%	67	2.63%	2,549
Rosebud	1,833	65.91%	751	27.00%	149	5.36%	48	1.73%	1,082	38.91%	2,781
Sheridan	1,031	67.17%	378	24.63%	101	6.58%	25	1.63%	653	42.54%	1,535
Stillwater	3,423	75.68%	750	16.58%	270	5.97%	80	1.77%	2,673	59.10%	4,523
Sweet Grass	1,362	70.83%	411	21.37%	113	5.88%	37	1.92%	951	49.46%	1,923
Teton	1,942	68.36%	617	21.72%	226	7.95%	56	1.97%	1,325	46.64%	2,841
Toole	1,184	74.33%	306	19.21%	73	4.58%	30	1.88%	878	55.12%	1,593
Treasure	303	84.17%	36	10.00%	18	5.00%	3	0.83%	267	74.17%	360
Valley	2,178	70.56%	642	20.80%	231	7.48%	36	1.17%	1,536	49.76%	3,087
Wheatland	652	75.90%	154	17.93%	43	5.01%	10	1.16%	498	57.97%	859
Wibaux	364	79.48%	54	11.79%	21	4.59%	19	4.15%	310	67.69%	458
Yellowstone	35,708	56.55%	21,411	33.91%	4,856	7.69%	1,166	1.85%	14,297	22.64%	63,141
Totals	128,172	58.10%	71,179	32.27%	17,199	7.80%	4,046	1.83%	56,993	25.83%	220,596

== See also ==
- 2026 Montana elections
- 2026 United States House of Representatives elections
- 2026 Montana House of Representatives election

== Notes ==
Partisan clients
