= 2026 Montana Initiative 132 =

Referendum on judicial elections being nonpartisan

- November 3, 2026
- CI-132 amends the Montana Constitution to require that judicial elections remain nonpartisan.
County results
Yes
80–90%
70–80%
60–70%
50–60%
No
50–60%

Constitutional Initiative 132 is a proposed constitutional initiative in Montana gathering signatures to qualify for the 2026 general election ballot. It was introduced by Montanans for Nonpartisan Courts in August 2025 and began gathering signatures for qualification in November 2025.

== History ==
Judges and justices have been elected on a nonpartisan basis in Montana since 1935, including for the Montana Supreme Court. Following attempts by the Montana legislature to pass numerous bills to undermine nonpartisan judicial elections, including introducing over one dozen bills during the 2025 session, Montanans for Nonpartisan Courts formed as a ballot issue committee in the summer of 2025 and introduced two potential constitutional initiatives to enshrine nonpartisan judicial elections in the Montana Constitution. Following the Montana Attorney General Austin Knudsen's attempt to rewrite ballot language for Ballot Issue #5, the Montana Supreme Court ruled against the Attorney General and restored the originally submitted ballot language later designated Constitutional Initiative 132.

== Contents ==
On the ballot for Montana voters, the ballot title for Initiative 132 will be:

CI-132 amends the Montana Constitution to require that judicial elections remain nonpartisan.

== Qualification ==
Montanans for Nonpartisan Courts began gathering signatures for CI-132 on November 21, 2025. The campaign announced they had gathered over 103,000 signatures by the June 19, 2026 deadline. Ballot certification in Montana occurs on August 20, 2026.

== Endorsements ==
Constitutional Initiative 132 was endorsed by nine retired Montana Supreme Court Justices, including retired Chief Justice Mike McGrath, retired Justices Patricia Cotter, William Leaphart, Jim Regnier, Jim Nelson, Dirk Sandefur, Terry Trieweiler, John Warner and Mike Wheat.

== Opposition ==
The Montana Republican Party has issued a resolution to formally oppose Constitutional Initiative 132.
