= List of California ballot propositions: 2010–2019 =

This is a list of California ballot propositions from 2010-2019.

== Elections ==
=== June 8, 2010 primary ===
| № | Result | Description |
|---|---|---|
| 13 | Passed | Limits on property tax assessment. Seismic retrofitting of existing buildings. Legislative constitutional amendment. |
| 14 | Passed | Elections. Open primaries/"Top Two primary Act". |
| 15 | Failed | California Fair Elections Act. |
| 16 | Failed | Imposes new two-thirds voter approval requirement for local public electricity providers. Initiative constitutional amendment. |
| 17 | Failed | Allows auto insurance companies to base their prices in part on a driver's history of insurance coverage. Initiative statute. |

=== November 2, 2010 general election ===
| № | Result | Description |
|---|---|---|
| 18 | Deferred | Safe, Clean, and Reliable Water Supply Act of 2010 — pushed back to November 2012 |
| 19 | Failed | Changes California law to legalize marijuana for recreational use. |
| 20 | Passed | Redistricting of congressional districts. |
| 21 | Failed | Establishes $18 annual vehicle license surcharge to help fund state parks and wildlife programs and grants free admission to all state parks to surcharged vehicles. |
| 22 | Passed | Prohibits the state from taking funds used for transportation or local government projects and services. |
| 23 | Failed | Repeals AB 32 until unemployment is below 5.5% for four consecutive quarters. |
| 24 | Failed | Repeals recent legislation (tax breaks) that would allow businesses to carry back losses, share tax credits, and use a sales-based income calculation to lower taxable income. |
| 25 | Passed | Changes legislative vote requirement to pass a budget from two-thirds to a simple majority. The two-thirds majority for passing taxes would not change. |
| 26 | Passed | Increases legislative vote requirement to two-thirds for state levies and charges. Imposes additional requirement for voters to approve local levies and charges with limited exceptions. |
| 27 | Failed | Repeals state legislature redistricting law |

=== June 5, 2012 primary ===
In October 2011, Governor Jerry Brown signed into law a bill which requires all future ballot initiatives to be listed only in general elections (held in November), rather than during any statewide election. The two initiative propositions below qualified for the next statewide election (which was the June 2012 presidential primaries) prior to the signing of the law.

| № | Result | Description |
|---|---|---|
| 28 | Passed | Limits on legislators' terms in office: state legislature from 14 to 12 years, 12 years total state Assembly and Senate term limits. |
| 29 | Failed | Imposes additional tax on cigarettes for cancer research. $1.00 per pack, equivalent tax increase on other tobacco products. |

=== November 6, 2012 general election ===
| № | Result | Description |
|---|---|---|
| 30 | Passed | Increases income and sales taxes temporarily for education and public safety funding. Initiative constitutional amendment. |
| 31 | Failed | Constitutional amendment changing responsibilities of local governments, the Legislature and the Governor in regards to the state budget. Initiative constitutional amendment and statute. |
| 32 | Failed | Prohibits Union and Corporate using payroll-deducted funds for political purposes, as well as to politicians or their political action committees. Initiative statute. |
| 33 | Failed | Changes current law to allow insurance companies to set prices based on whether the driver previously carried auto insurance with any insurance company. Initiative statute. |
| 34 | Failed | Repeals the death penalty. Initiative statute. |
| 35 | Passed | Imposes higher penalties on human trafficking. Initiative statute. |
| 36 | Passed | Revises three strikes law to impose life sentence only when new felony conviction is serious or violent. Initiative statute. |
| 37 | Failed | Requires labeling on raw or processed food offered for sale to consumers if made from plants or animals with genetic material changed in specified ways. Initiative statute. |
| 38 | Failed | Increases income taxes for education and early childhood programs. Initiative statute. |
| 39 | Passed | Requires multistate businesses to calculate their California income tax liability based on the percentage of their sales in California and allocates potential revenue to create energy efficient and clean jobs. Initiative statute. |
| 40 | Passed | Redistricting of State Senate districts. Referendum. |

=== June 3, 2014 primary ===
As per the aforementioned 2011 law, only mandatory propositions sent from the state legislature may appear on the June primary ballot.

| № | Result | Description |
|---|---|---|
| 41 | Passed | Veterans Housing and Homeless Prevention Bond Act Of 2014. |
| 42 | Passed | Requires local governments to comply with laws that provide public access to their body meetings and records of government officials. Also eliminates the reimbursement for the costs of such compliance. Legislative constitutional amendment. |

=== November 4, 2014 general election ===
| № | Result | Description |
|---|---|---|
| 43 | Passed | Water Quality, Supply, and Infrastructure Improvement Act of 2014. (pushed from November 2010 to a revised version for November 2014). |
| 44 | Passed | State Budget. Budget Stabilization Account. Legislative Constitutional Amendment. |
| 45 | Failed | Healthcare Insurance. Rate Changes. Initiative Statute. |
| 46 | Failed | Drug and Alcohol Testing of Doctors. Medical Negligence Lawsuits. Initiative Statute. |
| 47 | Passed | Criminal Sentences. Misdemeanor Penalties. Initiative Statute. |
| 48 | Failed | Indian Gaming Compacts. Referendum. |
| 49 | Deferred | Pulled from the November 2014 ballot by the California Supreme Court for further state constitutional review. The proposition eventually appeared on the November 2016 ballot as Proposition 59 |

=== June 7, 2016 primary election ===
As per the aforementioned 2011 law, only mandatory propositions sent from the state legislature may appear on the June primary ballot.

| № | Result | Description |
|---|---|---|
| 50 | Passed | Amends the state constitution to require a two-thirds vote in the respective chamber of the state legislature to suspend a state senator or assembly member. The proposal would also withhold the salaries and benefits of the suspended legislator. |

=== November 8, 2016 general election ===
The number of propositions in this election was significantly larger than previous elections. The increase has been attributed to the relatively low number of signatures required for ballot placement for this election. The number of signatures required for ballot placement is a percentage of the turnout in the previous election. Since the turnout in the November 2014 elections was low, the number of signatures required for ballot placement in 2016 was 365,880, whereas the typical requirement is well over half a million signatures.

| № | Result | Description |
|---|---|---|
| 51 | Passed | School Bonds. Funding for K-12 School and Community College Facilities. Initiative Statutory Amendment. This initiative statutory amendment would authorize $9 billion in bonds for school construction and modernization. |
| 52 | Passed | State Fees on Hospitals. Federal Medi-Cal Matching Funds. Initiative Statutory and Constitutional Amendment. Among others, this proposed initiative statutory and constitutional amendment would require a two-thirds vote in the state legislature to change laws that impose fees on hospitals for purpose of obtaining federal Medi-Cal matching funds. |
| 53 | Failed | Revenue Bonds. Statewide Voter Approval. Initiative Constitutional Amendment. This initiative constitutional amendment requires statewide voter approval for revenue bonds exceeding $2 billion for projects financed, owned, operated, or managed by the state or any joint agency created by or including the state. |
| 54 | Passed | Legislature. Legislation and Proceedings. Initiative Constitutional Amendment and Statute. Among other requirements, prohibits the legislature from passing any bill unless it has been published on the internet and in print for at least 72 hours prior to the vote. |
| 55 | Passed | Tax Extension to Fund Education and Healthcare. Initiative Constitutional Amendment. Extends income tax increases from 2012 and allocates the revenue from them for K-12 schools, community colleges, and healthcare programs. |
| 56 | Passed | Cigarette Tax to Fund Healthcare, Tobacco Use Prevention, Research, and Law Enforcement. Initiative Constitutional Amendment and Statute. Increases cigarette tax by $2.00 a pack and allocates revenues to healthcare programs and tobacco research. |
| 57 | Passed | Criminal Sentences. Juvenile Criminal Proceedings and Sentencing. Initiative Constitutional Amendment and Statute. Increases access to parole for people convicted of nonviolent felonies and modifies how juvenile defendants can be tried as adults. |
| 58 | Passed | Senate Bill 1174: This mandatory proposition, placed by the state legislature and Governor on September 2, 2014, would repeal most of 1998's California Proposition 227, and thus allow multi-language education in public schools. |
| 59 | Passed | Senate Bill 254: This mandatory proposition asks voters if they want California to work towards overturning the Citizens United Supreme Court ruling, in a similar manner to Proposition 49 from 2014 (which was removed from the ballot by the state supreme court). |
| 60 | Failed | Adult Films. Condoms. Health Requirements. Among other requirements, this initiative statute would mandate the use of condoms in adult films and require that producers of said films pay for STI testing and vaccinations for their performers. |
| 61 | Failed | State Prescription Drug Purchases. Pricing Standards. This initiative statute prohibits California state agencies from paying more for prescriptions drugs than the United States Department of Veterans Affairs pays. |
| 62 | Failed | Death Penalty. Initiative Statute. Repeals the death penalty and replaces it with life imprisonment without the possibility of parole as the maximum punishment for murder. |
| 63 | Passed | Firearms. Ammunition Sales. Initiative Statute. |
| 64 | Passed | Marijuana Legalization. Initiative Statute. Legalizes marijuana and hemp while imposing cultivation taxes and distribution standards. |
| 65 | Failed | Carry-Out Bags. Charges. Initiative Statute. Redirects revenues from the sale of carry-out bags at grocery stores to environmental projects under the Wildlife Conservation Board. |
| 66 | Passed | Death Penalty. Procedures. Initiative Statute. Limits death penalty appeals and length of time for death penalty review. Invalidates Proposition 62 if passed by a larger proportion of the popular vote. |
| 67 | Passed | Referendum to Ban Single-Use Plastic Bags. This is a referendum on a law signed by the Governor on September 30, 2014, that would impose a statewide ban on the distribution of single-use plastic bags at grocery stores. |

=== June 5, 2018 primary ===
As per the aforementioned 2011 law, only mandatory propositions sent from the state legislature may appear on the June primary ballot.

| № | Result | Description |
|---|---|---|
| 68 | Passed | California Drought, Water, Parks, Climate, Coastal Protection, and Outdoor Access For All Act of 2018. Authorizes $4 billion in bonds to fund various water, parks and coastal protection projects. |
| 69 | Passed | SB1 Gas Tax appropriations mandate and exempt from expenditures limit. This state constitution amendment ensures that revenues from SB1 Gas Taxes established by the Road Repair and Accountability Act of 2017 can only be used for transportation-related purposes. |
| 70 | Failed | Greenhouse Gas Reduction Reserve Fund. This state constitution amendment would have created a special fund, effective on January 1, 2024, that will collect the revenue from the California Air Resources Board's cap and trade programs, that were previously established by the Global Warming Solutions Act of 2006. A one-time, two-thirds vote in each chamber of the state legislature would then had been required for them to spend the money collected by this fund on greenhouse gas reduction projects. |
| 71 | Passed | Ballot measures-effective date. This state constitution amendment moves the effective date of passed ballot measures from the day after the election to the fifth day after the secretary of state certifies the results. |
| 72 | Passed | Property tax: new construction exclusion: rain water capture system. This state constitution amendment excludes rainwater capture systems, completed on or after January 1, 2019, from property tax assessments. |

=== November 6, 2018 general election ===
The filing fee for submitting a proposition to the ballot has been raised by a factor of 10, from $200 to $2,000, following the signing of a law in September 2015. Originally lawmakers wanted to raise the fee to $8,000 but compromised on $2,000. The fee is refunded if the proposition makes it to the ballot. The fee increase was in response to a proposition calling for "the execution of gays and lesbians" that was circulated for the 2016 election but did not make the ballot. During debate lawmakers were concerned that the fee increase may "discourage legitimate initiatives by average citizens".

| № | Result | Description |
|---|---|---|
| 1 | Passed | Veterans and Affordable Housing Bond Act of 2018. This mandatory proposition, placed by the state legislature and the Governor, will authorize $4 billion in bonds to fund various veterans' home loans and affordable housing programs. |
| 2 | Passed | No Place Like Home Act of 2018. This mandatory proposition, placed by the state legislature and the Governor, will allow revenue generated by 2004's Proposition 63, the 1 percent tax on incomes above $1 million, be used for $2 billion in bonds for homelessness prevention housing. |
| 3 | Failed | Authorizes Bonds to Fund Projects for Water Supply and Quality, Watershed, Fish, Wildlife, Water Conveyance, and Groundwater Sustainability and Storage. Initiative Statute. Authorizes $8.877 billion in bonds to fund such infrastructure projects. |
| 4 | Passed | Authorizes $1.5 billion in bonds to funding construction at various hospitals providing children’s health care. Initiative Statute. Authorizes $1.5 billion in bonds to fund grants for construction and improvements at various children's hospitals. |
| 5 | Failed | Changes Requirements for Certain Property Owners to Transfer Their Property Tax Base to Replacement Property. Initiative Constitutional Amendment and Statute. Will amend 1978's Proposition 13 by allowing homeowners who are over 55 years old or severely disabled to transfer their property tax base from their old home to their new one, regardless of the new residence's property value, location, or their previous transfers. |
| 6 | Failed | Eliminates Recently Enacted Road Repair and Transportation Funding by Repealing Revenues Dedicated for those Purposes. Requires any Measure to Enact Certain Vehicle Fuel Taxes and Vehicle Fees be Submitted to and Approved by the Electorate. Initiative Constitutional Amendment. Repeals the fuel tax increases and vehicle fees under the Road Repair and Accountability Act of 2017. Any future increases would then require a mandatory proposition placed on the ballot. |
| 7 | Passed | Daylight Savings Time. This mandatory proposition, placed by the state legislature and the Governor, will repeal 1949's Proposition 12, allowing the state legislature to enact permanent daylight saving time, subject to approval by the U.S. Congress. |
| 8 | Failed | Authorizes State Regulation of Kidney Dialysis Clinics. Limits Charges for Patient Care. Initiative Statute. Among other requirements, mandates that kidney dialysis clinics issue refunds to their patients if their revenue exceeds 115 percent of their costs of direct patient care and health care quality improvements. |
| 9 | Pulled | Division of California into Three States. Initiative Statute. Also known as the Cal 3 measure, would have divided California into three U.S. states, subject to approval by the U.S. Congress. Removed from the ballot by order of the California Supreme Court on July 18, 2018, for further legal review. |
| 10 | Failed | Expands Local Governments’ Authority to Enact Rent Control on Residential Property. Initiative Statute. Repeals the Costa–Hawkins Rental Housing Act of 1995, lifting its limits on municipal rent control ordinances. |
| 11 | Passed | Requires Private-Sector Emergency Ambulance Employees to Remain on Call During Work Breaks. Changes Other Conditions of Employment. Initiative Statute. Among other requirements, would require private-sector emergency ambulance employees to remain on call during breaks, be trained in certain emergency situations, and receive paid mental health services from their employers. |
| 12 | Passed | Establishes New Standards for Confinement of Certain Farm Animals; Bans Sale of Certain Non-Complying Products. Initiative Statute. Requires meats and eggs be produced from farm animals that are confined in areas greater than a specific amount of space. |
