= 2018 United States ballot measures =

- January 23 to November 6, 2018

Part of the 2018 United States elections

A total of 167 ballot measures were placed on the ballots of 38 states in the 2020 United States elections, with an additional measure placed on the ballot of the District of Columbia.

Measures are included whether they are initiated by a state legislature or by the citizens of said state. Subheadings are included under a state if there was a measure that was held on a different date with the subheading being the date of the ballot measures.

Results for each measure are included the "Results" heading and not under headings for each state with only whether they passed or not being included.

== By state ==
=== Alabama ===
| Origin | Status | Measure | Description (Result of a "yes" vote) | Date | Yes | No |
|---|---|---|---|---|---|---|
| Legislature | Approved | Alabama Amendment 1, Ten Commandments Amendment | Amend the Alabama Constitution to authorize the display of the Ten Commandments on public property, including public schools, and establish certain religious rights. The amendment also contained a provision preventing any public funds from being spent to defend the amendment in court. | Nov 6 | 1,094,677; 71.65% | 433,133; 28.35% |
| Legislature | Approved | Alabama Amendment 2, State Abortion Policy Amendment | Make it state policy to "recognize and support the sanctity of unborn life and the rights of unborn children, including the right to life" and to state that no provisions of the constitution provide a right to an abortion or require funding of abortions. | Nov 6 | 916,061; 59.01% | 636,438; 40.99% |
| Legislature | Approved | Alabama Amendment 3, Board of Trustees Membership for University of Alabama Amendment | Amend the state constitution to make the following changes to the membership of the board of trustees of the University of Alabama: remove the superintendent of education from the board; establish that, for the purposes of districts for the board of trustees membership, the congressional districts in use as of January 1, 2018, would be used; and remove the constitutional provision establishing an age limit of 70 for members of the board. | Nov 6 | 835,707; 60.30% | 550,299; 39.70% |
| Legislature | Approved | Alabama Amendment 4, Legislative Vacancies Amendment | Amend the state constitution that if a vacancy in the state Senate or House occurred on or after October 1 of the year before the regular election, the seat would remain vacant until the next regular election, and vacant seats could be filled without an election if only one candidate is running for the vacant seat. | Nov 6 | 973,951; 66.13% | 498,918; 33.87% |

=== Alaska ===
| Origin | Status | Measure | Description (Result of a "yes" vote) | Date | Yes | No |
|---|---|---|---|---|---|---|
| Citizens | Failed | Alaska Ballot Measure 1, Salmon Habitat Protections and Permits Initiative | Establish new requirements and a new permitting process for any projects affecting bodies of water related to the activity and habitat of salmon, steelhead or other anadromous fish, and to prohibit any projects or activity determined to cause significant and unrestorable damage to such fish habitats. | Nov 6 | 103,836; 37.68% | 171,711; 62.32% |

=== Arizona ===
| Origin | Status | Measure | Description (Result of a "yes" vote) | Date | Yes | No |
|---|---|---|---|---|---|---|
| Legislature | Approved | Arizona Proposition 125, Adjustments to Elected Officials' and Corrections Officer's Retirement Plans Amendment | Make adjustments to retirement plans based on cost-of-living adjustments, rather than permanent benefit increases, for correctional officers, probation officers, and surveillance officers (Corrections Officer Retirement Plan) and elected officials (Elected Officials' Retirement Plan). | Nov 6 | 1,130,219; 51.72% | 1,055,201; 48.28% |
| Citizens | Approved | Arizona Proposition 126, Prohibit New or Increased Taxes on Services Initiative | Prohibit the state and local governments from enacting new taxes or increasing tax rates on services performed in the state. | Nov 6 | 1,436,106; 64.09% | 804,794; 35.91% |
| Citizens | Failed | Arizona Proposition 127, Renewable Energy Standards Initiative | Require electric utilities in Arizona to acquire a certain percentage of electricity from renewable resources each year, with the percentage increasing annually from 12 percent in 2020 to 50 percent in 2030. | Nov 6 | 723,138; 31.40% | 1,580,101; 68.60% |
| Veto Referendum | Failed | Arizona Proposition 305, Expansion of Empowerment Scholarship Accounts Referendum | uphold the contested legislation, Senate Bill 1431, which would phase in an expansion of the state's Empowerment Scholarship Accounts (ESAs) program to make all public school students eligible to apply for an ESA. | Nov 6 | 790,608; 35.17% | 1,457,070; 64.83% |
| Legislature | Approved | Arizona Proposition 306, Clean Election Account Uses and Commission Rulemaking Measure | Prohibit candidates from using their public financing accounts to give funds to political parties or tax-exempt 501(a) organizations that are allowed to engage in activities to influence candidate elections and require the Citizens Clean Election Commission's proposed rules to receive approval from the Governor’s Regulatory Review Council. | Nov 6 | 1,248,675; 56.19% | 973,385; 43.81% |

=== Arkansas ===
| Origin | Status | Measure | Description (Result of a "yes" vote) | Date | Yes | No |
|---|---|---|---|---|---|---|
| Legislature | Approved | Arkansas Issue 2, Voter ID Amendment | require individuals to present valid photo ID to cast non provisional ballots in person or absentee. | Nov 6 | 692,622; 79.47% | 178,936; 20.53% |
| Citizens | Approved | Arkansas Issue 4, Casinos Authorized in Crittenden, Garland, Pope, and Jefferson Counties Initiative | Authorize one casino each in Crittenden, Garland, Pope, and Jefferson Counties. | Nov 6 | 470,954; 54.10% | 399,530; 45.90% |
| Citizens | Approved | Arkansas Issue 5, Minimum Wage Increase Initiative | Incrementally raise the minimum wage in Arkansas to $11 an hour by 2021. | Nov 6 | 605,784; 68.46% | 279,046; 31.54% |

=== California ===
| Origin | Status | Measure | Description (Result of a "yes" vote) | Date | Yes | No |
|---|---|---|---|---|---|---|
| Bond Issue | Approved | California Proposition 68, Parks, Environment, and Water Bond | Authorize $4 billion in general obligation bonds for state and local parks, environmental protection projects, water infrastructure projects, and flood protection projects. | Jun 5 | 3,455,226; 57.59% | 2,544,854; 42.41% |
| Legislature | Approved | California Proposition 69, Transportation Taxes and Fees Lockbox and Appropriations Limit Exemption Amendment | Require that revenue from the diesel sales tax and Transportation Improvement Fee enacted by the Road Repair and Accountability Act of 2017 (RRAA) be used for transportation-related purposes and exempt revenue generated by SB 1's tax increases and fee schedules from the state appropriations limit. | Jun 5 | 4,886,924; 81.33% | 1,121,924; 18.67% |
| Legislature | Failed | California Proposition 70, Vote Requirement to Use Cap-and-Trade Revenue Amendment | Require a one-time two-thirds vote in each chamber of the state legislature in 2024 or thereafter to pass a spending plan for revenue from the state's cap-and-trade program for greenhouse gases. | Jun 5 | 2,229,468; 37.31% | 3,746,434; 62.69% |
| Legislature | Approved | California Proposition 71, Effective Date of Ballot Measures Amendment | Move the effective date of ballot propositions, including citizen initiatives and legislative referrals, from the day after election day to the fifth day after the secretary of state certifies election results. | Jun 5 | 4,527,073; 77.85% | 1,288,385; 22.15% |
| Legislature | Approved | California Proposition 72, Rainwater Capture Systems Excluded from Property Tax Assessments Amendment | Allow the state legislature to exclude rainwater capture systems added after January 1, 2019, from property tax reassessments. | Jun 5 | 4,979,651; 84.23% | 932,263; 15.77% |
| Bond Issue | Approved | California Proposition 1, Housing Programs and Veterans' Loans Bond | Authorize $4 billion in general obligation bonds for housing-related programs, loans, grants, and projects and housing loans for veterans. | Nov 6 | 6,751,018; 56.22% | 5,258,157; 43.78% |
| Legislature | Approved | California Proposition 2, Use Millionaire's Tax Revenue for Homelessness Prevention Housing Bonds Measure | Authroize the state to use revenue from Proposition 63 (2004)—a 1 percent tax on income above $1 million for mental health services—on $2 billion in revenue bonds for homelessness prevention housing for persons in need of mental health services. | Nov 6 | 7,662,528; 63.43% | 4,417,327; 36.57% |
| Citizens | Failed | California Proposition 3, Water Infrastructure and Watershed Conservation Bond Initiative | Authorize $8.877 billion in general obligation bonds for water infrastructure, groundwater supplies and storage, surface water storage and dam repairs, watershed and fisheries improvements, and habitat protection and restoration. | Nov 6 | 5,879,836; 49.35% | 6,034,991; 50.65% |
| Citizens | Approved | California Proposition 4, Children's Hospital Bonds Initiative | Authorize $1.5 billion in bonds for the construction, expansion, renovation, and equipping of children's hospitals in California. | Nov 6 | 7,551,298; 62.69% | 4,494,143; 37.31% |
| Citizens | Failed | California Proposition 5, Property Tax Transfer Initiative | Amend Proposition 13 (1978) to allow homebuyers who are age 55 or older or severely disabled to transfer their tax assessments, with a possible adjustment, from their prior home to their new home, no matter the new home's market value; the new home's location in the state; or the buyer's number of moves. | Nov 6 | 4,813,251; 40.22% | 7,152,993; 59.78% |
| Citizens | Failed | California Proposition 6, Voter Approval for Future Gas and Vehicle Taxes and 2017 Tax Repeal Initiative | Repeal fuel tax increases and vehicle fees that were enacted in 2017, including the Road Repair and Accountability Act of 2017 (RRAA) and require voter approval (via ballot propositions) for the California State Legislature to impose, increase, or extend fuel taxes or vehicle fees in the future. | Nov 6 | 5,283,222; 43.18% | 6,952,081; 56.82% |
| Legislature | Approved | California Proposition 7, Legislative Power to Change Daylight Saving Time Measure | Allow the California State Legislature to change the dates and times of the daylight saving time period, as consistent with federal law, by a two-thirds vote, including establishing permanent, year-round standard time or permanent, year-round DST (if federal law is changed to allow for permanent DST). | Nov 6 | 7,167,315; 59.75% | 4,828,564; 40.25% |
| Citizens | Failed | California Proposition 8, Limits on Dialysis Clinics' Revenue and Required Refunds Initiative | Require dialysis clinics to issue refunds to patients or patients' payers for revenue above 115 percent of the costs of direct patient care and healthcare improvements. | Nov 6 | 4,845,264; 40.07% | 7,247,917; 59.93% |
| Citizens | Failed | California Proposition 10, Local Rent Control Initiative | Allow local governments to adopt rent control on any type of rental housing, thus repealing the Costa-Hawkins Rental Housing Act. | Nov 6 | 4,949,543; 40.57% | 7,251,443; 59.43% |
| Citizens | Approved | California Proposition 11, Ambulance Employees Paid On-Call Breaks, Training, and Mental Health Services Initiative | Allow ambulance providers to require workers to remain on-call during breaks paid at their regular rate; require employers to provide additional training for EMTs and paramedics; and requiring employers to provide EMTs and paramedics with some paid mental health services. | Nov 6 | 7,181,116; 59.63% | 4,861,831; 40.37% |
| Citizens | Approved | California Proposition 12, Farm Animal Confinement Initiative | Establish minimum space requirements based on square feet for calves raised for veal, breeding pigs, and egg-laying hens and ban the sale of veal from calves, pork from breeding pigs, and eggs from hens when the animals are confined to areas below minimum square-feet requirements. | Nov 6 | 7,551,434; 62.66% | 4,499,702; 37.34% |

=== Colorado ===
| Origin | Status | Measure | Description (Result of a "yes" vote) | Date | Yes | No |
|---|---|---|---|---|---|---|
| Legislature | Approved | Colorado Amendment A, Removal of Exception to Slavery Prohibition for Criminals Amendment | Remove part of the Colorado Constitution that says slavery and involuntary servitude are allowable for the punishment of a crime. A yes vote would remove an exception to the prohibition of slavery and involuntary servitude in the case of punishment for a crime from the state constitution. | Nov 6 | 1,599,790; 66.21% (Note: In order for a ballot measure intended to amend the Colorado Constitution to pass it must first meet a 55% minimum voter threshold.) | 816,342; 33.79% |
| Legislature | Failed | Colorado Amendment V, Reduced Age Qualification for General Assembly Members Amendment | Reduce the age qualification from 25 to 21 for citizens to be members of the state House of Representatives or state Senate. | Nov 6 | 889,179; 36.19% | 1,567,560; 63.81% |
| Legislature | Failed | Colorado Amendment W, Judge Retention Ballot Language Amendment | Shorten the ballot by allowing county clerks to use one judge retention question for each level of courts with individual judges listed as ballot items below the one judge retention question. | Nov 6 | 1,262,713; 53.81% | 1,083,712; 46.91% |
| Legislature | Approved | Colorado Amendment X, Definition of Industrial Hemp Amendment | Remove the definition of industrial hemp from the Colorado Constitution and instead requiring that industrial hemp have the same definition as in federal law. | Nov 6 | 1,421,630; 60.64% | 922,597; 39.36% |
| Legislature | Approved | Colorado Amendment Y, Independent Commission for Congressional Redistricting Amendment | Create a 12-member commission responsible for approving district maps for Colorado's congressional districts. | Nov 6 | 1,711,008; 71.37% | 686,260; 28.63% |
| Legislature | Approved | Colorado Amendment Z, Independent Commission for State Legislative Redistricting Amendment | Create a 12-member commission responsible for approving district maps for Colorado's state House of Representatives and state Senate districts; establish qualifying criteria for members and restrictions on prior or current elected officials, candidates, or lobbyists being members; and enact requirements for the district maps. | Nov 6 | 1,687,583; 71.07% | 687,113; 28.93% |
| Citizens | Failed | Colorado Amendment 73, Establish Income Tax Brackets and Raise Taxes for Education Initiative | Establish an income tax bracket system rather than a flat income tax rate and raise taxes for individuals earning more than $150,000 per year, raise the corporate income tax rate, and create the Quality Public Education Fund. | Nov 6 | 1,137,527; 46.43% | 1,312,331; 53.57% |
| Citizens | Failed | Colorado Amendment 74, Compensation to Owners for Decreased Property Value Due to State Regulation Initiative | Require that property owners be compensated for any reduction in property value caused by state laws or regulations. | Nov 6 | 1,139,205; 46.42% | 1,315,182; 53.58% |
| Citizens | Failed | Colorado Amendment 75, Campaign Contribution Limits Initiative | Provide that if any candidate for state office directs (by loan or contribution) more than one million dollars in support of his or her own campaign (or candidate committee), then every candidate for the same office in the same primary or general election may accept five times the aggregate amount of campaign contributions normally allowed. | Nov 6 | 813,861; 34.04% | 1,576,835; 65.96% |
| Citizens | Failed | Colorado Proposition 109, "Fix Our Damn Roads" Transportation Bond Initiative | Authorize $3.5 billion in bonds to fund statewide transportation projects including bridge expansion, construction, maintenance, and repairs, and require that the state repay the debt from the general fund without raising taxes. | Nov 6 | 952,814; 39.28% | 1,472,933; 60.72% |
| Citizens | Failed | Colorado Proposition 110, "Let's Go Colorado" Transportation Bond and Sales Tax Increase Initiative | Authorize $6 billion in bonds to fund transportation projects, establish the Transportation Revenue Anticipation Notes Citizen Oversight Committee, and raise the state sales tax rate by 0.62 percent from 2.9 percent (2018) to 3.52 percent for 20 years starting on January 1, 2019, through January 1, 2039. | Nov 6 | 990,287; 40.61% | 1,448,535; 59.39% |
| Citizens | Approved | Colorado Proposition 111, Limits on Payday Loan Charges Initiative | Reduce the annual interest rate on payday loans to a yearly rate of 36 percent and eliminate all other finance charges and fees associated with payday lending. | Nov 6 | 1,865,200; 77.25% | 549,357; 22.75% |
| Citizens | Failed | Colorado Proposition 112, Minimum Distance Requirements for New Oil, Gas, and Fracking Projects Initiative | Mandate that new oil and gas development projects, including fracking, be a minimum distance of 2,500 feet from occupied buildings and other areas designated as vulnerable. | Nov 6 | 1,116,738; 44.88% | 1,371,284; 55.12% |

=== Connecticut ===
| Origin | Status | Measure | Description (Result of a "yes" vote) | Date | Yes | No |
|---|---|---|---|---|---|---|
| Legislature | Approved | Connecticut Amendment 1, Transportation Revenue Lockbox Amendment | Prohibit lawmakers from using the state transportation fund for anything other than transportation purposes. | Nov 6 | 1,030,888; 88.63% | 132,279; 11.37% |
| Legislature | Approved | Connecticut Amendment 2, Legislative Requirements to Transfer State Properties Amendment | Require a public hearing on bills to authorize the transfer, sale, or disposal of state-owned properties, such as state parks, forests, and conserved lands, to non-state entities and require a two-thirds vote of the Connecticut General Assembly to authorize the transfer, sale, or disposal of land under the control of the state agriculture or environmental protection departments. | Nov 6 | 954,467; 84.55% | 174,348; 15.45% |

=== Florida ===
| Origin | Status | Measure | Description (Result of a "yes" vote) | Date | Yes | No |
|---|---|---|---|---|---|---|
| Legislature | Failed | Florida Amendment 1, Homestead Exemption Increase Amendment | Exempt the portion of assessed home values between $100,000 and $125,000 from property taxes other than school taxes, bringing the maximum homestead exemption up to $75,000. | Nov 6 | 4,560,689; 58.06% | 3,293,857; 41.94% (Note: In order for a ballot measure intended to amend the Florida Constitution to pass it must first meet a 60% minimum voter threshold.) |
| Legislature | Approved | Florida Amendment 2, Permanent Cap on Nonhomestead Parcel Assessment Increases Amendment | Make permanent the cap of 10 percent on annual non-homestead parcel assessment increases set to expire on January 1, 2019. | Nov 6 | 5,162,544; 66.49% | 2,601,316; 33,51% |
| Citizens | Approved | Florida Amendment 3, Voter Approval of Casino Gambling Initiative | Provide voters, through citizen-initiated ballot measures, with the exclusive right to decide whether to authorize casino gambling in Florida. | Nov 6 | 5,676,456; 71.47% | 2,266,516; 28.53% |
| Citizens | Approved | Florida Amendment 4, Voting Rights Restoration for Felons Initiative | Automatically restore the right to vote for people with prior felony convictions, except those convicted of murder or a felony sexual offense, upon completion of their sentences, including prison, parole, and probation. | Nov 6 | 5,148,926; 64.55% | 2,828,339; 35.45% |
| Legislature | Approved | Florida Amendment 5, Two-Thirds Vote of Legislature to Increase Taxes or Fees Amendment | Require a two-thirds vote of each chamber of the Florida State Legislature to enact new taxes or fees or increase existing ones. | Nov 6 | 5,164,658; 65.73% | 2,693,174; 34.27% |
| Commission Referral | Approved | Florida Amendment 6, Marsy's Law Crime Victims Rights, Judicial Retirement Age, and Judicial Interpretation of Laws and Rules Amendment | Add specific rights of crime victims, together known as a Marsy's Law, to the Florida Constitution; increase the judicial retirement age from 70 to 75 years of age; and prohibit state courts from deferring to an administrative agency’s interpretation of a state statute or rule in lawsuits. | Nov 6 | 4,835,950; 61.61% | 3,013,601; 38.39% |
| Commission Referral | Approved | Florida Amendment 7, First Responder and Military Member Survivor Benefits, Supermajority Board Votes for College Fees, and State College System Amendment | Require employers to provide death benefits, as the state legislature defines, to the surviving spouses of first responders while engaged in official duties; require the state to provide death benefits, as the state legislature defines, to the surviving spouses of active-duty U.S. Armed Forces members who are accidentally killed or unlawfully and intentionally killed; require a nine-member vote of the board of trustees and 12-member vote of the board of governors to increase a college fee; and place the current structure of the state's system of higher education in the Florida Constitution. | Nov 6 | 5,148,300; 65.76% | 2,680,942; 34.24% |
| Commission Referral | Approved | Florida Amendment 9, Ban Offshore Oil and Gas Drilling and Ban Vaping in Enclosed Indoor Workplaces Amendment | Ban offshore drilling for oil and natural gas on lands beneath all state waters and ban the use of vapor-generating electronic devices, such as electronic cigarettes, in enclosed indoor workplaces. | Nov 6 | 5,415,308; 68.92% | 2,442,410; 31.08% |
| Commission Referral | Approved | Florida Amendment 10, State and Local Government Structure Amendment | Require, rather than authorize, the legislature to provide for a state Department of Veterans Affairs; create a state Office of Domestic Security and Counter-Terrorism; require the legislature to convene regular session on the second Tuesday of January of even-numbered years; and prohibit counties from abolishing certain local offices—sheriff, tax collector, property appraiser, supervisor of elections, and clerk of the circuit court—and requiring elections for these offices. | Nov 6 | 4,847,740; 63.15% | 2,828,607; 36.85% |
| Commission Referral | Approved | Florida Amendment 11, Repeal Prohibition on Aliens' Property Ownership, Delete Obsolete Provision on High-Speed Rail, and Repeal of Criminal Statutes' Effect on Prosecution Amendment | Repeal constitutional provision prohibiting foreign-born persons ineligible for citizenship from owning, inheriting, disposing, and possession property; repeal an obsolete constitutional provision stating that a high-speed ground transportation system be developed in Florida; and delete the constitutional provision that an amendment to a criminal statute does not affect the prosecution of a crime committed before the statute's amendment. | Nov 6 | 4,680,526; 62.13% | 2,852,468; 37.87% |
| Commission Referral | Approved | Florida Amendment 12, Lobbying Restrictions Amendment | Prohibit public officials from lobbying for compensation during the official's term in office and for six years after the official leaves office and prohibiting public officials from using the office to obtain a disproportionate benefit. | Nov 6 | 6,116,404; 78.92% | 1,633,249; 21.08% |
| Commission Referral | Approved | Florida Amendment 13, Ban on Wagering on Dog Races Amendment | prohibiting wagering on live dog races, including greyhound races, held in Florida and banning dog races in Florida on which there is wagering. | Nov 6 | 6,116,404; 78.92% | 1,633,249; 21.08% |

=== Georgia ===
| Origin | Status | Measure | Description (Result of a "yes" vote) | Date | Yes | No |
|---|---|---|---|---|---|---|
| Legislature | Approved | Georgia Amendment 1, Portion of Revenue from Outdoor Recreation Equipment Sales Tax Dedicated to Land Conservation Fund Amendment | Authorize the legislature to dedicate up to 80 percent of revenue from the sales and use tax on outdoor recreation equipment to the Georgia Outdoor Stewardship Trust Fund to fund land conservation. | Nov 6 | 3,161,607; 82.89% | 652,560; 17.11% |
| Legislature | Approved | Georgia Amendment 2, Establish a State Business Court Amendment | Establish a state business court and establish procedures and rules for judicial selection, term length, and judge qualifications for the court. | Nov 6 | 2,560,107; 69.01% | 1,149,503; 30.99% |
| Legislature | Approved | Georgia Amendment 3, Forest Land Conservation and Timberland Properties Amendment | Allow the legislature to change the formula used to calculate the tax on forest land conservation use property and create a new land designation for commercial timberland and to establish a percentage of local grant assistance funding that could be retained by the state for administration. | Nov 6 | 2,275,659; 62.18% | 1,384,369; 37.82% |
| Legislature | Approved | Georgia Amendment 4, Marsy's Law Crime Victim Rights Amendment | add specific rights of crime victims, together known as a Marsy's Law, to the Georgia Constitution. | Nov 6 | 2,275,659; 62.18% | 1,384,369; 37.82% |
| Legislature | Approved | Georgia Amendment 5, School Sales Tax Referendums Amendment | Allow a school district or districts with a majority of enrolled students within a county to call for a referendum to levy a sales tax for education purposes. | Nov 6 | 2,640,831; 71.24% | 1,065,878; 28.76% |
| Legislature | Approved | Georgia Referendum A, Homestead Municipal Property Tax Exemption Measure | Provide for a homestead property tax exemption in certain municipalities equal to the difference between the home's assessed value for the current year and the adjusted base year value of the home. | Nov 6 | 2,060,127; 57.09% | 1,548,608; 42.91% |
| Legislature | Approved | Georgia Referendum B, Include Business-Financed Properties in Existing Non-Profit Mentally Disabled Housing Tax Exemption Measure | Clarify that an existing tax exemption for nonprofit housing for the mentally disabled can be applied to housing constructed or renovated through financing from businesses. | Nov 6 | 2,860,293; 76.93% | 857,809; 23.07% |

=== Hawaii ===
| Origin | Status | Measure | Description (Result of a "yes" vote) | Date | Yes | No |
|---|---|---|---|---|---|---|
| Automatic Referral | Failed | Hawaii Constitutional Convention Question | Hold a constitutional convention to explore proposals for changes to the state constitution. | Nov 6 | 94,579; 25.57% | 275,300; 74.43% |

=== Idaho ===
| Origin | Status | Measure | Description (Result of a "yes" vote) | Date | Yes | No |
|---|---|---|---|---|---|---|
| Citizens | Failed | Idaho Proposition 1, Authorize Betting on Historical Horse Races Initiative | Legalize the use of video terminals for betting on historical horse races, also known as instant racing. | Nov 6 | 278,212; 46.20% | 323,924; 53.80% |
| Citizens | Approved | Idaho Proposition 2, Medicaid Expansion Initiative | Expand Medicaid eligibility to those under sixty-five years old whose income is 133 percent of the federal poverty level or below and who are not eligible for other state insurance coverage, which would effectively increase the coverage level to 138 percent under the provisions of the Affordable Care Act. | Nov 6 | 365,107; 60.58% | 237,567; 39.42% |

=== Indiana ===
| Origin | Status | Measure | Description (Result of a "yes" vote) | Date | Yes | No |
|---|---|---|---|---|---|---|
| Legislature | Approved | Indiana Public Question 1, Balanced Budget Amendment | Require the state legislature to enact a balanced budget for each biennial budget period. | Nov 6 | 1,361,753; 71.33% | 547,220; 28.67% |

=== Kentucky ===
| Origin | Status | Measure | Description (Result of a "yes" vote) | Date | Yes | No |
|---|---|---|---|---|---|---|
| Legislature | Approved | Kentucky Marsy's Law Crime Victims Rights Amendment | Add specific rights of crime victims, together known as a Marsy's Law, to the Kentucky Constitution. | Nov 6 | 868,932; 62.81% | 514,440; 37.19% |

=== Louisiana ===
| Origin | Status | Measure | Description (Result of a "yes" vote) | Date | Yes | No |
|---|---|---|---|---|---|---|
| Legislature | Approved | Louisiana Amendment 1, Felons Disqualified to Run for Office for Five Years Amendment | Prohibit convicted felons, unless pardoned, from seeking or holding a public office until five years after the completion of their sentences. | Nov 6 | 1,090,500; 74.66% | 370,085; 25.34% |
| Legislature | Approved | Louisiana Amendment 2, Unanimous Jury Verdict for Felony Trials Amendment | Require the unanimous agreement of jurors, rather than just 10 of 12 jurors, to convict people charged with felonies. | Nov 6 | 938,182; 64.35% | 519,731; 35.65% |
| Legislature | Approved | Louisiana Amendment 3, Exchange of Public Equipment and Personnel Between Political Subdivisions Amendment | Allow political subdivisions of the state, through a written agreement, to exchange public equipment and personnel for an action or function the receiving subdivision is authorized to exercise. | Nov 6 | 791,714; 56.03% | 621,198; 43.97% |
| Legislature | Approved | Louisiana Amendment 4, No Dedication of Transportation Trust Fund Revenue to State Police Amendment | End the dedication of revenue from the Transportation Trust Fund to state police for traffic control. | Nov 6 | 792,972; 55.94% | 624,691; 44.06% |
| Legislature | Approved | Louisiana Amendment 5, Special Assessment for Homes in Trusts Amendment | Allow special assessments on a home in trust for a resident who is the settlor of the trust and is a disabled veteran or the surviving spouse of a person who died while performing their duties as a first responder, active duty member of the military, law enforcement officer, or fire protection officer. | Nov 6 | 1,013,722; 71.50% | 403,989; 28.50% |
| Legislature | Approved | Louisiana Amendment 6, Phase-In of Tax Increases from Property Reappraisal Amendment | Require that tax increases from reappraisals—estimates of a property’s market value—resulting in a property's value increasing more than 50 percent be phased in over the course of four years. | Nov 6 | 809,381; 57.55% | 596,950; 42.45% |

=== Maine ===
| Origin | Status | Measure | Description (Result of a "yes" vote) | Date | Yes | No |
|---|---|---|---|---|---|---|
| Veto Referendum | Approved | Maine Question 1, Ranked-Choice Voting Delayed Enactment and Automatic Repeal Referendum | Overturn sections of Legislative Document 1646, which was written to postpone and repeal ranked-choice voting unless a constitutional amendment was passed before December 1, 2021, to enable the legislature to determine election methods. | Jun 12 | 149,900; 53.88% | 128,291; 46.12% |
| Citizens | Failed | Maine Question 1, Payroll and Non-Wage Income Taxes for Home Care Program Initiative | Enact a payroll tax and non-wage income tax to fund a program called the Universal Home Care Program. | Nov 6 | 235,679; 37.14% | 398,819; 62.86% |
| Bond Issue | Approved | Maine Question 2, Wastewater Infrastructure Bond Issue | Authorize $30 million in general obligation bonds for wastewater infrastructure improvements. | Nov 6 | 344,507; 54.62% | 286,248; 45.38% |
| Bond Issue | Approved | Maine Question 3, Transportation Bond Issue | Authorize $106 million in general obligation bonds for transportation infrastructure projects. | Nov 6 | 427,357; 67.71% | 203,780; 32.29% |
| Bond Issue | Approved | Maine Question 4, University of Maine System Bond Issue | Authorize $49 million in general obligation bonds for the construction and remodeling of existing and new facilities within the University of Maine System. | Nov 6 | 340,743; 54.16% | 288,455; 45.84% |
| Bond Issue | Approved | Maine Question 5, Community Colleges Bond Issue | Authorize $15 million in general obligation bonds for the renovation and expansion of instructional laboratories, information technology infrastructure, and heating and ventilating systems at Maine's seven community colleges. | Nov 6 | 410,288; 64.89% | 221,947; 35.11% |

=== Maryland ===
| Origin | Status | Measure | Description (Result of a "yes" vote) | Date | Yes | No |
|---|---|---|---|---|---|---|
| Legislature | Approved | Maryland Question 1, Gambling Revenue Dedicated to Education Lockbox Amendment | Amend the state constitution to dedicate certain revenue from video lotteries to education as supplementary funding. | Nov 6 | 1,873,235; 89.06% | 230,027; 10.94% |
| Legislature | Approved | Maryland Question 2, Election-Day Voter Registration Amendment | Amend the state constitution to authorize the state legislature to enact a process for registering qualified individuals to vote at a precinct polling place on election day. | Nov 6 | 1,456,168; 67.77% | 692,603; 32.23% |

=== Massachusetts ===
| Origin | Status | Measure | Description (Result of a "yes" vote) | Date | Yes | No |
|---|---|---|---|---|---|---|
| Citizens | Failed | Massachusetts Question 1, Nurse-Patient Assignment Limits Initiative | Establish patient assignment limits for registered nurses working in hospitals. | Nov 6 | 787,511; 29.76% | 1,858,483; 70.24% |
| Legislature | Approved | Massachusetts Question 2, Advisory Commission for Amendments to the U.S. Constitution Regarding Corporate Personhood and Political Spending Initiative | Establish a 15-member citizens' commission to advocate for certain amendments to the United States Constitution regarding political spending and corporate personhood. | Nov 6 | 1,871,989; 71.36% | 751,447; 28.64% |
| Veto Referendum | Approved | Massachusetts Question 3, Gender Identity Anti-Discrimination Veto Referendum | Uphold Senate Bill 2407, a bill to prohibit discrimination based on gender identity in public places—such as hotels, restaurants, and stores. | Nov 6 | 1,806,742; 67.82% | 857,401; 32.18% |

=== Michigan ===
| Origin | Status | Measure | Description (Result of a "yes" vote) | Date | Yes | No |
|---|---|---|---|---|---|---|
| Citizens | Approved | Michigan Proposal 1, Marijuana Legalization Initiative | Legalize the recreational use and possession of marijuana for persons 21 years of age or older and enacting a tax on marijuana sales. | Nov 6 | 2,354,640; 55.89% | 1,858,354; 44.11% |
| Citizens | Approved | Michigan Proposal 2, Independent Redistricting Commission Initiative | Transfer the power to draw the state's congressional and legislative districts from the Michigan State Legislature to an independent redistricting commission. | Nov 6 | 2,519,975; 61.27% | 1,592,910; 38.73% |
| Citizens | Approved | Michigan Proposal 3, Voting Policies in State Constitution Initiative | Add eight voting policies to the Michigan Constitution, including straight-ticket voting, automatic voter registration, same-day voter registration, and no-excuse absentee voting. | Nov 6 | 2,775,387; 66.90% | 1,373,151; 33.10% |

=== Missouri ===
| Origin | Status | Measure | Description (Result of a "yes" vote) | Date | Yes | No |
|---|---|---|---|---|---|---|
| Veto Referendum | Failed | Missouri Proposition A, Right to Work Referendum | Uphold the contested legislation, Senate Bill 19, which would have enacted a right to work law to mandate that no person can be required to pay dues to a labor union or join a labor union as a condition of employment. | Aug 7 | 453,283; 32.53% | 939,973; 67.47% |
| Citizens | Approved | Missouri Amendment 1, Lobbying, Campaign Finance, and Redistricting Initiative | Make changes to the state's lobbying laws, campaign finance limits for state legislative candidates, and legislative redistricting process. | Nov 6 | 1,469,093; 62.02% | 899,613; 37.98% |
| Citizens | Approved | Missouri Amendment 2, Medical Marijuana and Veteran Healthcare Services Initiative | Legalize marijuana for medical purposes, tax marijuana sales at 4 percent, and spend tax revenue on healthcare services for veterans. | Nov 6 | 1,583,227; 65.59% | 830,631; 34.41% |
| Citizens | Failed | Missouri Amendment 3, Medical Marijuana and Biomedical Research and Drug Development Institute Initiative | Legalize marijuana for medical purposes, tax marijuana sales at 15 percent, and spend tax revenue on a Biomedical Research and Drug Development Institute. | Nov 6 | 754,007; 31.50% | 1,639,622; 68.50% |
| Legislature | Approved | Missouri Amendment 4, Management and Advertisement of Bingo Games Amendment | Lower the time required that someone is a member of an organization to manage a bingo game for that organization from two years to six months and remove the constitutional ban on organizations advertising bingo games. | Nov 6 | 1,194,304; 52.39% | 1,085,158; 47.61% |
| Citizens | Approved | Missouri Proposition B, $12 Minimum Wage Initiative | increasing the state's minimum wage each year until reaching $12 in 2023 and then making increases or decreases based on changes in the Consumer Price Index. | Nov 6 | 1,499,002; 62.34% | 905,647; 37.66% |
| Citizens | Failed | Missouri Proposition C, Medical Marijuana and Veterans Healthcare Services, Education, Drug Treatment, and Public Safety Initiative | Legalize marijuana for medical purposes, tax marijuana sales at 2 percent, and spend tax revenue on veterans' services, drug treatment, education, and law enforcement. | Nov 6 | 1,039,251; 43.57% | 1,345,762; 56.43% |
| Legislature | Failed | Missouri Proposition D, Gas Tax Increase, Olympic Prize Tax Exemption, and Traffic Reduction Fund Measure | Incrementally increase the gas tax from 17 cents to 27 cents per gallon by June 2022, with revenue from the motor fuel tax increase dedicated to the state highway patrol, exempt prizes for Special Olympics, Paralympics, and Olympics from state taxes, and create a dedicated fund for certain road projects that reduce traffic bottlenecks that affect freight. | Nov 6 | 1,109,009; 46.40% | 1,281,143; 53.60% |

=== Montana ===
| Origin | Status | Measure | Description (Result of a "yes" vote) | Date | Yes | No |
|---|---|---|---|---|---|---|
| Legislature | Approved | Montana LR-128, Property Tax for State University System Measure | Renew a six-mill tax on real estate and personal property to provide funding for the Montana University System from January 1, 2019, through December 31, 2028. | Nov 6 | 307,704; 62.94% | 181,171; 37.06% |
| Legislature | Approved | Montana LR-129, Ballot Collection Measure | Ban persons from collecting the election ballots of other people, with exceptions for certain individuals. | Nov 6 | 301,172; 62.81% | 178,324; 37.19% |
| Citizens | Failed | Montana I-185, Extend Medicaid Expansion and Increase Tobacco Taxes Initiative | Extend expanded eligibility for Medicaid coverage and raise taxes on tobacco products to fund Montana's Medicaid expansion programs (which would otherwise expire on June 30, 2019) as well as other healthcare-related programs. | Nov 6 | 236,990; 47.30% | 264,087; 52.70% |
| Citizens | Failed | Montana I-186, Requirements for Permits and Reclamation Plans of New Hard Rock Mines Initiative | Establish new requirements for a hard rock mine permits based on standards for water quality in land restoration plans. | Nov 6 | 220,266; 44.36% | 276,232; 55.64% |

=== Nebraska ===
| Origin | Status | Measure | Description (Result of a "yes" vote) | Date | Yes | No |
|---|---|---|---|---|---|---|
| Citizens | Approved | Nebraska Initiative 427, Medicaid Expansion Initiative | Require the state to provide Medicaid for persons under the age of 65 and with incomes equal to or below 138 percent of the federal poverty line. | Nov 6 | 356,891; 53.55% | 309,533; 46.45% |

=== Nevada ===
| Origin | Status | Measure | Description (Result of a "yes" vote) | Date | Yes | No |
|---|---|---|---|---|---|---|
| Legislature | Approved | Nevada Question 1, Marsy's Law Crime Victims Rights Amendment | Add specific rights of crime victims, together known as a Marsy's Law, to the Nevada Constitution. | Nov 6 | 579,788; 61.19% | 367,686; 38.81% |
| Legislature | Approved | Nevada Question 2, Sales Tax Exemption for Feminine Hygiene Products Measure | Exempt feminine hygiene products from state and local sales taxes. | Nov 6 | 536,991; 56.48% | 413,731; 43.52% |
| Citizens | Failed | Nevada Question 3, Changes to Energy Market and Prohibit State-Sanctioned Electric-Generation Monopolies Amendment | Rrequire the state legislature to pass laws to establish “an open, competitive retail electric energy market,” prohibit the state from granting electrical-generation monopolies, and protect “against service disconnections and unfair practices" and declare that persons, businesses, and political subdivisions have a “right to choose the provider of its electric utility service” and cannot be forced to purchase electricity from one provider. | Nov 6 | 316,951; 32.95% | 644,843; 67.05% (Note: In Nevada, citizen initiated constitutional amendments need to be approved in two even-numbered election years, meaning that Question 3 needed to be approved in 2016 and again in 2018 to amend the Nevada Constitution. As the amendment failed to pass in 2018 it was not added to the Nevada Constitution.) |
| Citizens | Approved | Nevada Question 4, Medical Equipment Sales Tax Exemption Amendment | Require the state legislature to exempt from sales and use tax durable medical equipment, oxygen delivery equipment, and mobility enhancing equipment prescribed for human use by a licensed health care provider. | Nov 6 | 637,140; 67.38% (Note: In Nevada, citizen-initiated constitutional amendments need to be approved in two even-numbered election years, meaning that Question 4 needed to be approved in 2016 and again in 2018 to amend the Nevada Constitution. As the amendment passed in both 2016 and 2018 it was added to the Nevada Constitution.) | 308,517; 32.62% |
| Citizens | Approved | Nevada Question 5, Automatic Voter Registration via DMV Initiative | Provide for the automatic voter registration of eligible citizens when receiving certain services from the Nevada Department of Motor Vehicles. | Nov 6 | 567,740; 59.57% | 385,297; 40.43% |
| Citizens | Approved | Nevada Question 6, Renewable Energy Standards Initiative | Require electric utilities to acquire 50 percent of their electricity from renewable resources by 2030. | Nov 6 | 562,729; 59.28% (Note: In Nevada, citizen initiated constitutional amendments need to be approved in two even-numbered election years, meaning that Question 6 needed to be approved in 2018 and again in 2020 to amend the Nevada Constitution.) | 386,482; 40.72% |

=== New Hampshire ===
| Origin | Status | Measure | Description (Result of a "yes" vote) | Date | Yes | No |
|---|---|---|---|---|---|---|
| Legislature | Approved | New Hampshire Question 1, Taxpayer Standing to Bring Legal Actions Against Government Amendment | Give taxpayers the right to take legal action against the state or local government where the taxpayer resides to declare that the government spent, or has approved spending, public funds in violation of a law. | Nov 6 | 411,518; 82.69% | 86,135; 17.31% |
| Legislature | Approved | New Hampshire Question 2, Right to Live Free from Governmental Intrusion in Private and Personal Information Amendment | Provide that individuals have a right to live free from governmental intrusion in private or personal information. | Nov 6 | 409,325; 81.00% | 96,019; 19.00% |

=== New Jersey ===
| Origin | Status | Measure | Description (Result of a "yes" vote) | Date | Yes | No |
|---|---|---|---|---|---|---|
| Bond Issue | Approved | New Jersey Public Question 1, School Projects Bond | Issue $500 million in general obligation bonds for project grants related to vocational schools, college career and technical education, school water infrastructure, and school security. | Nov 6 | 1,250,746; 54.15% | 1,059,066; 45.85% |

=== New Mexico ===
| Origin | Status | Measure | Description (Result of a "yes" vote) | Date | Yes | No |
|---|---|---|---|---|---|---|
| Legislature | Approved | New Mexico Constitutional Amendment 1, Judicial Appeal Process Provided by Law Amendment | Empower the legislature to pass laws setting the appeals process from probate courts and other inferior courts to higher courts and determining which cases originating in inferior courts and tribunals fall under the appellate jurisdiction of district courts. | Nov 6 | 337,966; 58.16% | 243,100; 41.84% |
| Legislature | Approved | New Mexico Constitutional Amendment 2, Independent Ethics Commission Amendment | Create a seven-member state ethics commission tasked with investigating alleged violations of ethical conduct by state officials, executive and legislative employees, candidates, lobbyists, government contractors, and others as provided by law. | Nov 6 | 466,029; 75.18% | 153,869; 24.82% |
| Bond Issue | Approved | New Mexico Bond Question A, Senior Citizen Facilities | Authorize the sale and issuance of $10.77 million in bonds for senior citizen facilities, including to address code compliance issues and purchasing new equipment and vehicles. | Nov 6 | 444,526; 70.87% | 182,749; 29.13% |
| Bond Issue | Approved | New Mexico Bond Question B, Public Libraries | Authorize the sale and issuance of $12.876 million in bonds for academic, public school, tribal, and public libraries. | Nov 6 | 430,788; 68.78% | 195,523; 31.22% |
| Bond Issue | Approved | New Mexico Bond Question C, School Buses | Authorize the sale and issuance of $6.137 million in bonds to purchase school buses and equip school buses with air conditioning. | Nov 6 | 429,398; 68.85% | 194,273; 31.15% |
| Bond Issue | Approved | New Mexico Bond Question D, Higher Education, Special Schools, and Tribal Schools | Authorize the sale and issuance of $136.230 million in bonds for institutions of higher education, special schools, and tribal schools. | Nov 6 | 413,105; 65.80% | 214,752; 34.20% |

=== North Carolina ===
| Origin | Status | Measure | Description (Result of a "yes" vote) | Date | Yes | No |
|---|---|---|---|---|---|---|
| Legislature | Approved | North Carolina Right to Hunt and Fish Amendment | Create a state constitutional right to hunt, fish, and harvest wildlife for North Carolina residents. | Nov 6 | 2,083,123; 57.13% | 1,563,090; 42.87% |
| Legislature | Approved | North Carolina Marsy's Law Crime Victims Rights Amendment | Amend Section 37 of Article I of the North Carolina Constitution, a section addressing the rights of crime victims, with a version of a Marsy's Law. | Nov 6 | 2,267,210; 62.13% | 1,382,010; 37.87% |
| Legislature | Approved | North Carolina Income Tax Cap Amendment | Lower the maximum allowable state income tax rate from 10 percent to 7 percent. | Nov 6 | 2,094,924; 57.35% | 1,557,707; 42.65% |
| Legislature | Approved | North Carolina Voter ID Amendment | Create a constitutional requirement that voters present a photo ID to vote in person. | Nov 6 | 2,049,121; 55.49% | 1,643,983; 44.51% |
| Legislature | Failed | North Carolina Legislative Appointments to Elections Board Amendment | Remove the governor's power to make appointments to the Bipartisan State Board of Ethics and Elections Enforcement, meaning legislative leaders would make all eight appointments to the board. | Nov 6 | 1,371,446; 38.40% | 2,199,787; 61.60% |
| Legislature | Failed | North Carolina Judicial Selection for Midterm Vacancies Amendment | Create a new process of filling judicial vacancies that occur between judicial elections for state courts involving a commission selecting candidates, legislators narrowing the list of candidates down to two, and the governor selecting the final nominee. | Nov 6 | 1,183,080; 33.15% | 2,385,696; 66.85% |

=== North Dakota ===
| Origin | Status | Measure | Description (Result of a "yes" vote) | Date | Yes | No |
|---|---|---|---|---|---|---|
| Citizens | Approved | North Dakota Measure 1, Ethics Commission, Foreign Political Contribution Ban, and Conflicts of Interest Initiative | Establish an ethics commission, ban foreign political contributions, and enact provisions related to lobbying and conflicts of interest. | Nov 6 | 169,676; 53.63% | 146,709; 46.37% |
| Citizens | Approved | North Dakota Measure 2, Citizen Requirement for Voting Amendment Initiative | Amend the North Dakota Constitution to state that “only a citizen” of the U.S. can vote in federal, state, and local elections. | Nov 6 | 208,499; 65.93% | 107,751; 34.07% |
| Citizens | Failed | North Dakota Measure 3, Marijuana Legalization and Automatic Expungement Initiative | Legalize the recreational use of marijuana in the state of North Dakota for people 21 years of age or older and create an automatic expungement process for individuals with convictions for a controlled substance that has been legalized. | Nov 6 | 132,199; 40.55% | 193,837; 59.45% |
| Citizens | Approved | North Dakota Measure 4, Special License Plates and Free Access to State Parks for Volunteer Emergency Responders Initiative | Provide volunteer emergency responders in North Dakota with a special license plate and allowing free entry to North Dakota state parks. | Nov 6 | 203,634; 64.32% | 112,964; 35.68% |

=== Ohio ===
| Origin | Status | Measure | Description (Result of a "yes" vote) | Date | Yes | No |
|---|---|---|---|---|---|---|
| Legislature | Approved | Ohio Issue 1, Congressional Redistricting Procedures Amendment | Change the vote requirements to pass congressional redistricting maps and the standards used in congressional redistricting in Ohio. | May 8 | 1,178,468; 74.89% | 395,088; 25.11% |
| Citizens | Failed | Ohio Issue 1, Drug and Criminal Justice Policies Initiative | make offenses related to drug possession and use no more than misdemeanors, prohibit courts from ordering persons on probation for felonies be sent to prison for non-criminal probation violations; create a sentence credits program for inmates' participation in rehabilitative, work, or educational programs; and require the state to spend savings due to a reduction of inmates, resulting from Issue 1, on drug treatment, crime victim, and rehabilitation programs. | Nov 6 | 1,623,933; 36.97% | 2,769,140; 63.03% |

=== Oklahoma ===
| Origin | Status | Measure | Description (Result of a "yes" vote) | Date | Yes | No |
|---|---|---|---|---|---|---|
| Citizens | Approved | Oklahoma State Question 788, Medical Marijuana Legalization Initiative | Legalize the licensed cultivation, use, and possession of marijuana for medicinal purposes. | Jun 26 | 507,582; 56.86% | 385,176; 43.14% |
| Citizens | Failed | Oklahoma State Question 793, Right of Optometrists and Opticians to Practice in Retail Establishments Initiative | Provide optometrists and opticians with a constitutional right to practice within a retail establishment that sells merchandise to the public. | Nov 6 | 580,341; 49.76% | 585,928; 50.24% |
| Legislature | Approved | Oklahoma State Question 794, Marsy's Law Crime Victim Rights Amendment | add specific rights of crime victims, together known as a Marsy's Law, to the Oklahoma Constitution. | Nov 6 | 905,195; 78.01% | 255,230; 21.99% |
| Legislature | Failed | Oklahoma State Question 798, Governor and Lieutenant Governor Joint Ticket Amendment | Amend the Oklahoma Constitution to provide for the governor and lieutenant governor to be elected together on one ticket starting in 2026. | Nov 6 | 528,614; 45.91% | 622,863; 54.09% |
| Legislature | Failed | Oklahoma State Question 800, Oil and Gas Development Tax Revenue Investment Fund Amendment | Amend the Oklahoma Constitution to establish a fund for the investment of 5 percent of the state's oil and gas development tax revenue and for the annual transfer of 4 percent of the fund's capital to the general fund. | Nov 6 | 488,612; 42.78% | 653,630; 57.22% |
| Legislature | Failed | Oklahoma State Question 801, Allow Certain Voter-Approved Property Taxes to Fund School District Operations Amendment | Amend the Oklahoma Constitution to allow certain local voter-approved property taxes—known as ad valorem levies—to be used to fund school district operations as well as construction. | Nov 6 | 572,811; 49.60% | 581,989; 50.40% |

=== Oregon ===
| Origin | Status | Measure | Description (Result of a "yes" vote) | Date | Yes | No |
|---|---|---|---|---|---|---|
| Veto Referendum | Approved | Oregon Measure 101, Healthcare Insurance Premiums Tax for Medicaid Referendum | Uphold certain assessments/taxes on healthcare insurance and the revenue of certain hospitals to provide funding for Medicaid expansion by approving five sections of House Bill 2391. | Jan 23 | 657,117; 61.68% | 408,387; 38.32% |
| Legislature | Approved | Oregon Measure 102, Removes Restriction that Affordable Housing Projects Funded by Municipal Bonds be Government Owned | Amend the state constitution to allow counties, cities, and towns to—with voter approval and certain restrictions—use bond revenue to fund the construction of affordable housing without necessarily retaining complete ownership of the constructed housing. | Nov 6 | 1,037,922; 56.90% | 786,225; 43.10% |
| Citizens | Failed | Oregon Measure 103, Ban Tax on Groceries Initiative | Prohibit state and local governments from enacting taxes on groceries. | Nov 6 | 791,687; 42.69% | 1,062,752; 57.31% |
| Citizens | Failed | Oregon Measure 104, Definition of Raising Revenue for Three-Fifths Vote Requirement Initiative | Apply a three-fifths supermajority vote requirement to any legislation that increases revenue through changes in tax exemptions, credits, and deductions. | Nov 6 | 631,211; 34.81% | 1,182,023; 65.19% |
| Citizens | Failed | Oregon Measure 105, Repeal Sanctuary State Law Initiative | Repeal Oregon's sanctuary state law which limits the cooperation of local law enforcement with federal immigration enforcement. | Nov 6 | 675,389; 36.54% | 1,172,774; 63.46% |
| Citizens | Failed | Oregon Measure 106, Ban Public Funds for Abortions Initiative | Prohibit public funds from being spent on abortions in Oregon, except when determined to be medically necessary or required by federal law. | Nov 6 | 658,793; 35.52% | 1,195,718; 64.48% |

=== Rhode Island ===
| Origin | Status | Measure | Description (Result of a "yes" vote) | Date | Yes | No |
|---|---|---|---|---|---|---|
| Bond Issue | Approved | Rhode Island Question 1, School Buildings Bond Measure | Authorize $250 million in bonds over five years—with no more than $100 million issued in any one year—in order to fund school housing aid and the school building authority capital fund. | Nov 6 | 271,259; 76.68% | 82,517; 23.32% |
| Bond Issue | Approved | Rhode Island Question 2, Higher Education Facilities Bond Measure | Authorize $70 million in bonds for higher education facilities. | Nov 6 | 208,714; 59.47% | 142,240; 40.53% |
| Bond Issue | Approved | Rhode Island Question 3, Environment, Recreation, and Water Infrastructure Bond Measure | Authorize $47.3 million in bonds for environmental, water, and recreational projects. | Nov 6 | 277,976; 78.86% | 74,536; 21.14% |

=== South Carolina ===
| Origin | Status | Measure | Description (Result of a "yes" vote) | Date | Yes | No |
|---|---|---|---|---|---|---|
| Legislature | Failed | South Carolina Amendment 1, Appointed Superintendent of Education Measure | making the position of state superintendent of education a governor-appointed position, rather than an elected position. | Nov 6 | 654,943; 39.90% | 986,685; 60.10% |

=== South Dakota ===
| Origin | Status | Measure | Description (Result of a "yes" vote) | Date | Yes | No |
|---|---|---|---|---|---|---|
| Legislature | Approved | South Dakota Constitutional Amendment Y, Changes to Marsy's Law Crime Victim Rights Amendment | Amend the state constitution to make changes to the Marsy's Law crime victim rights amendment passed by voters in 2016. | Jun 5 | 106,498; 79.51% | 27,448; 20.49% |
| Citizens | Approved | South Dakota Initiated Measure 24, Ban Out-of-State Contributions to Ballot Question Committees Initiative | Ban individuals, political action committees, and other entities from outside South Dakota from making contributions to ballot question committees. | Nov 6 | 174,960; 55.52% | 140,172; 44.48% |
| Citizens | Failed | South Dakota Initiated Measure 25, Tobacco Tax Increase Initiative | Increase the tax on cigarettes from about $1.53 per pack of 20 cigarettes to $2.53 per pack of 20 cigarettes and increasing the tax on wholesale tobacco products from 35 to 55 percent, with a portion of tobacco tax revenue dedicated to technical institutes. | Nov 6 | 148,775; 44.89% | 182,654; 55.11% |
| Citizens | Failed | South Dakota Constitutional Amendment W, State Campaign Finance and Lobbying Laws, Government Accountability Board, and Initiative Process Amendment | Amend the state constitution to revise campaign finance and lobbying laws, create a government accountability board, and establish new laws governing the initiative and referendum process. | Nov 6 | 142,769; 45.06% | 174,081; 54.94% |
| Legislature | Failed | South Dakota Constitutional Amendment X, 55% Vote Requirement to Approve Constitutional Amendments Measure | Require a 55% vote, rather than a simple majority vote, to approve a constitutional amendment. | Nov 6 | 140,730; 45.68% | 167,362; 54.32% |
| Legislature | Approved | South Dakota Constitutional Amendment Z, Single-Subject Rule for Constitutional Amendments | Amend the state constitution to require that all constitutional amendments—whether initiated constitutional amendments or legislatively referred constitutional amendments—concern only one subject and that multiple proposed amendments to the constitution be voted on separately. | Nov 6 | 195,790; 62.41% | 117,947; 37.59% |

=== Utah ===
| Origin | Status | Measure | Description (Result of a "yes" vote) | Date | Yes | No |
|---|---|---|---|---|---|---|
| Legislature | Approved | Utah Constitutional Amendment A, Active Military Property Tax Exemption Measure | Change the required amount of time served in the military under an order of active duty to receive a property tax exemption from 200 days in a calendar year (or 200 consecutive days) to 200 days in a 365-day period. | Nov 6 | 797,945; 78.86% | 213,928; 21.14% |
| Legislature | Failed | Utah Constitutional Amendment B, Tax Exemption for Property Leased by a Government Entity | Amend the state constitution to allow property tax exemptions for properties leased by a local or state government entity. | Nov 6 | 287,329; 28.38% | 725,194; 71.62% |
| Legislature | Approved | Utah Constitutional Amendment C, Changes Related to Special Legislative Sessions and State Revenue Measure | Allow the state legislature, through a two-thirds vote, to call a special session of up to ten days to deal with matters such as a fiscal crisis, war, natural disaster, or other emergency; allow a special session of the legislature, other than the 45-day annual general session, to be held at a location other than the state capitol if it is not feasible due to a specified condition; and require the governor to either reduce state expenditures or convene a special legislative session if the state's expenses exceed the state's revenue for a fiscal year. | Nov 6 | 636,034; 63.42% | 366,921; 36.58% |
| Advisory Question | Failed | Utah Nonbinding Opinion Question 1, 10 Cents per Gallon Gas Tax Increase for Education and Local Roads | Advise the state legislature to pass a gas tax increase of 10 cents per gallon to fund local road construction and maintenance, thereby freeing up additional funding for education. | Nov 6 | 363,878; 34.55% | 689,254; 65.45% |
| Citizens | Approved | Utah Proposition 2, Medical Marijuana Initiative | Legalize the medical use of marijuana for individuals with qualifying medical illnesses. | Nov 6 | 562,072; 52.75% | 503,558; 47.25% |
| Citizens | Approved | Utah Proposition 3, Medicaid Expansion Initiative | Provide Medicaid for persons under the age of 65 and with incomes equal to or below 138 percent of the federal poverty line and increase the sales tax from 4.70 to 4.85 percent to finance the state's portion of the costs to expand Medicaid. | Nov 6 | 555,651; 53.32% | 486,483; 46.68% |
| Citizens | Approved | Utah Proposition 4, Independent Advisory Commission on Redistricting Initiative | Create a seven-member independent redistricting commission to draft and recommend to the Utah State Legislature maps for congressional and state legislative districts according to certain criteria. | Nov 6 | 512,218; 50.34% | 505,274; 49.66% |

=== Virginia ===
| Origin | Status | Measure | Description (Result of a "yes" vote) | Date | Yes | No |
|---|---|---|---|---|---|---|
| Legislature | Approved | Virginia Question 1, Property Tax Exemption for Flood Abatement Amendment | Amend the state constitution to empower the state legislature to authorize local governments to provide a partial local property tax exemption for real estate subject to recurrent flooding that undertook improvements to prevent flooding or long-term damage from flooding. | Nov 6 | 2,305,867; 70.73% | 954,252; 29.27% |
| Legislature | Approved | Virginia Question 2, Remove Restriction on Residence for Surviving Spouse of Disabled Veteran Tax Exemption Amendment | Amend the state constitution to remove a restriction on where the surviving spouse of a disabled military veteran may have his or her principal place of residence in order to receive a property tax exemption. | Nov 6 | 2,755,941; 84.37% | 510,399; 15.63% |

=== Washington ===
| Origin | Status | Measure | Description (Result of a "yes" vote) | Date | Yes | No |
|---|---|---|---|---|---|---|
| Citizens | Approved | Washington Initiative 940, Police Training and Criminal Liability in Cases of Deadly Force Measure | Create a good faith test to determine when the use of deadly force by police is justifiable, require police to receive de-escalation and mental health training, and require law enforcement officers to provide first aid. | Nov 6 | 1,834,579; 59.60% | 1,243,316; 40.40% |
| Citizens | Failed | Washington Initiative 1631, Carbon Emissions Fee Measure | Enact a carbon emissions fee of $15 per metric ton of carbon beginning on January 1, 2020; increase the fee by $2 annually until the state's greenhouse gas reduction goals are met; and use the revenue from the fee to fund various programs and projects related to the environment. | Nov 6 | 1,340,725; 43.44% | 1,745,703; 56.56% |
| Citizens | Approved | Washington Initiative 1634, Prohibit Local Taxes on Groceries Measure | Prohibit local governments from enacting taxes on groceries. | Nov 6 | 1,721,487; 55.88% | 1,359,240; 44.12% |
| Citizens | Approved | Washington Initiative 1639, Changes to Gun Ownership and Purchase Requirements Measure | Implement restrictions on the purchase and ownership of firearms including raising the minimum age to purchase a gun to 21, adding background checks, increasing waiting periods, and enacting storage requirements. | Nov 6 | 1,839,475; 59.35% | 1,259,681; 40.65% |
| Advisory Question | Failed | Washington Advisory Vote 19, Non-Binding Question on Oil Spill Tax Repeal | Support Senate Bill 6269, which applied a tax on crude oil and petroleum products when received through a pipeline, thereby advising the legislature to uphold the bill. | Nov 6 | 1,360,769; 46.47% | 1,567,629; 53.53% |

=== West Virginia ===
| Origin | Status | Measure | Description (Result of a "yes" vote) | Date | Yes | No |
|---|---|---|---|---|---|---|
| Legislature | Approved | West Virginia Amendment 1, No Right to Abortion in Constitution Measure | Add language to the West Virginia Constitution stating that "nothing in this Constitution secures or protects a right to abortion or requires the funding of abortion." | Nov 6 | 295,536; 51.73% | 275,748; 48.27% |
| Legislature | Approved | West Virginia, Amendment 2, Legislative Authority over Budgeting for State Judiciary Amendment | Amend the West Virginia Constitution to authorize the legislature to reduce the budget of the state judiciary by up to 15 percent. | Nov 6 | 386,272; 72.35% | 147,594; 27.65% |

=== Wisconsin ===
| Origin | Status | Measure | Description (Result of a "yes" vote) | Date | Yes | No |
|---|---|---|---|---|---|---|
| Legislature | Failed | Wisconsin Question 1, Elimination of State Treasurer Amendment | Eliminate the elected position of state treasurer. | Apr 3 | 361,963; 38.25% | 584,323; 61.75% |

== Other jurisdictions ==
=== Washington D.C. ===
| Origin | Status | Measure | Description (Result of a "yes" vote) | Date | Yes | No |
|---|---|---|---|---|---|---|
| Citizens | Approved | Washington, D.C., Initiative 77, Minimum Wage Increase for Tipped Workers | Increase the minimum wage for tipped employees to match the city's standard minimum wage by 2026. | Jun 19 | 47,230; 55.74% | 37,504; 44.26% |
