= 2018 California elections =

- November 6, 2018
- Registered: 19,696,371
- Turnout: 64.54% (▼10.73 pp)

Elections were held in California on November 6, 2018, with primary elections being held on June 5, 2018. Voters elected one member to the United States Senate, 53 members to the United States House of Representatives, all eight state constitutional offices, all four members to the Board of Equalization, 20 members to the California State Senate, and all 80 members to the California State Assembly, among other elected offices.

Pursuant to Proposition 14 passed in 2010, California uses a nonpartisan blanket primary. All the candidates for the same elected office, regardless of respective political party, run against each other at once during the primary. The candidates receiving the most and second-most votes in the primary election then become the contestants in the general election.

== United States Congress ==
Vote by mail ballots being counted in Santa Clara County

=== Senate ===
Incumbent Democrat Dianne Feinstein won re-election.

United States Senate election in California, 2018
Primary election
Party	Candidate	Votes	%
Democratic	Dianne Feinstein (incumbent)	2,947,035	44.2
Democratic	Kevin de León	805,446	12.1
Republican	James P. Bradley	556,252	8.3
Republican	Arun K. Bhumitra	350,815	5.3
Republican	Paul A. Taylor	323,533	4.9
Republican	Erin Cruz	267,494	4.0
Republican	Tom Palzer	205,183	3.1
Democratic	Alison Hartson	147,061	2.2
Republican	Rocky De La Fuente	135,278	2.0
Democratic	Pat Harris	126,947	1.9
Republican	John "Jack" Crew	93,806	1.4
Republican	Patrick Little	89,867	1.3
Republican	Kevin Mottus	87,646	1.3
Republican	Jerry Joseph Laws	67,140	1.0
Libertarian	Derrick Michael Reid	59,999	0.9
Democratic	Adrienne Nicole Edwards	56,172	0.8
Democratic	Douglas Howard Pierce	42,671	0.6
Republican	Mario Nabliba	39,209	0.6
Democratic	David Hildebrand	30,305	0.5
Democratic	Donnie O. Turner	30,101	0.5
Democratic	Herbert G. Peters	27,468	0.4
No party preference	David Moore	24,614	0.4
No party preference	Ling Ling Shi	23,506	0.4
Peace and Freedom	John Thompson Parker	22,825	0.3
No party preference	Lee Olson	20,393	0.3
Democratic	Gerald Plummer	18,234	0.3
No party preference	Jason M. Hanania	18,171	0.3
No party preference	Don J. Grundmann	15,125	0.2
No party preference	Colleen Shea Fernald	13,536	0.2
No party preference	Rash Bihari Ghosh	12,557	0.2
No party preference	Tim Gildersleeve	8,482	0.1
No party preference	Michael Fahmy Girgis	2,986	0.0
Green	Michael V. Ziesing (write-in)	842	0.0
No party preference	Ursula M. Schilling (write-in)	17	0.0
Democratic	Seelam Prabhakar Reddy (write-in)	4	0.0
Total votes		6,697,720	100.00
General election
Democratic	Dianne Feinstein (incumbent)	6,019,422	54.2
Democratic	Kevin de León	5,093,942	45.8
Total votes		11,113,364	100.0
Democratic hold			

== Statewide constitutional offices ==
=== Governor ===
Results by county: Newsom: 50–60%; 60–70%; 70–80%; 80–90%; Cox: 50–60%; 60–70%; 70–80%

Incumbent Democrat Jerry Brown was term-limited and was succeeded by Democratic lieutenant governor Gavin Newsom.

2018 California gubernatorial election
Primary election
Party	Candidate	Votes	%
Democratic	Gavin Newsom	2,343,792	33.7
Republican	John H. Cox	1,766,488	25.4
Democratic	Antonio Villaraigosa	926,394	13.3
Republican	Travis Allen	658,798	9.5
Democratic	John Chiang	655,920	9.4
Democratic	Delaine Eastin	234,869	3.4
Democratic	Amanda Renteria	93,446	1.3
Republican	Robert C. Newman II	44,674	0.6
Democratic	Michael Shellenberger	31,692	0.6
Republican	Peter Y. Liu	27,336	0.4
Republican	Yvonne Girard	21,840	0.3
Peace and Freedom	Gloria Estela La Riva	19,075	0.3
Democratic	J. Bribiesca	17,586	0.3
Green	Josh Jones	16,131	0.2
Libertarian	Zoltan Istvan	14,462	0.2
Democratic	Albert Caesar Mezzetti	12,026	0.2
Libertarian	Nickolas Wildstar	11,566	0.2
Democratic	Robert Davidson Griffis	11,103	0.2
Democratic	Akinyemi Agbede	9,380	0.1
Democratic	Thomas Jefferson Cares	8,937	0.1
Green	Christopher N. Carlson	7,302	0.1
Democratic	Klement Tinaj	5,368	0.1
No party preference	Hakan "Hawk" Mikado	5,346	0.1
No party preference	Johnny Wattenburg	4,973	0.1
No party preference	Desmond Silveira	4,633	0.1
No party preference	Shubham Goel	4,020	0.1
No party preference	Jeffrey Edward Taylor	3,973	0.1
Green	Veronika Fimbres (write-in)	62	0.0
No party preference	Arman Soltani (write-in)	32	0.0
No party preference	Peter Crawford Valentino (write-in)	21	0.0
Republican	K. Pearce (write-in)	8	0.0
No party preference	Armando M. Arreola (write-in)	1	0.0
Total votes		6,961,254	100.0
General election
Democratic	Gavin Newsom	7,721,410	61.9
Republican	John H. Cox	4,742,825	38.1
Total votes		12,464,235	100.0
Democratic hold			

=== Lieutenant governor ===
Results by county: Kounalakis: 50–60%; 60–70%; Hernandez: 50–60%; 60–70%

Incumbent Democrat Gavin Newsom was term-limited and was succeeded by the Democratic former United States Ambassador to Hungary Eleni Kounalakis.

2018 California lieutenant gubernatorial election
Primary election
Party	Candidate	Votes	%
Democratic	Eleni Kounalakis	1,587,940	24.2
Democratic	Ed Hernandez	1,347,442	20.6
Republican	Cole Harris	1,144,003	17.5
Democratic	Jeff Bleich	648,045	9.9
Republican	David Fennell	515,956	7.9
Republican	Lydia Ortega	419,512	6.4
Republican	David R. Hernandez	404,982	6.2
No party preference	Gayle McLaughlin	263,364	4.0
Libertarian	Tim Ferreira	99,949	1.5
Democratic	Cameron Gharabiklou	78,267	1.2
No party preference	Danny Thomas	44,121	0.7
No party preference	Marjan S. Fariba (write-in)	18	0.0
Total votes		6,553,599	100.0
General election
Democratic	Eleni Kounalakis	5,914,068	56.6
Democratic	Ed Hernandez	4,543,863	43.4
Total votes		10,457,931	100.0
Democratic hold			

=== Attorney general ===
Results by county: Becerra: 50–60%; 60–70%; 70–80%; 80–90%; Bailey: 50–60%; 60–70%; 70–80%

Incumbent Democrat Xavier Becerra won his first election after his appointment and confirmation to the office on January 24, 2017.

2018 California Attorney General election
Primary election
Party	Candidate	Votes	%
Democratic	Xavier Becerra (incumbent)	3,024,611	45.8
Republican	Steven C. Bailey	1,615,859	24.5
Democratic	Dave Jones	1,017,427	15.4
Republican	Eric Early	943,071	14.3
Total votes		6,600,968	100.0
General election
Democratic	Xavier Becerra (incumbent)	7,790,743	63.6
Republican	Steven K. Bailey	4,465,587	36.4
Total votes		12,256,330	100.0
Democratic hold			

=== Secretary of state ===
Results by county: Padilla: 50–60%; 60–70%; 70–80%; 80–90%; Meuser: 50–60%; 60–70%; 70–80%

Incumbent Democrat Alex Padilla won re-election.

2018 California Secretary of State election
Primary election
Party	Candidate	Votes	%
Democratic	Alex Padilla (incumbent)	3,475,633	52.6
Republican	Mark P. Meuser	2,047,903	31.0
Democratic	Ruben Major	355,036	5.4
Republican	Raul Rodriguez Jr.	330,460	5.0
Libertarian	Gail Lightfoot	155,879	2.4
Green	Michael Feinstein	136,725	2.1
Peace and Freedom	C.T. Weber	61,375	0.9
Green	Erik Rydberg	48,705	0.7
Total votes		6,611,716	100.0
General election
Democratic	Alex Padilla (incumbent)	7,909,521	64.5
Republican	Mark P. Meuser	4,362,545	35.5
Total votes		12,272,066	100.0
Democratic hold			

=== Treasurer ===
Results by county: Ma: 50–60%; 60–70%; 70–80%; 80–90%; Conlon: 50–60%; 60–70%; 70–80%

Incumbent Democrat John Chiang left office to run for governor and was succeeded by Democratic State Board of Equalization member Fiona Ma.

2018 California State Treasurer election
Primary election
Party	Candidate	Votes	%
Democratic	Fiona Ma	2,900,606	44.5
Republican	Greg Conlon	1,357,635	20.8
Republican	Jack M. Guerrero	1,257,315	19.3
Democratic	Vivek Viswanathan	848,026	13.0
Peace and Freedom	Kevin Akin	148,282	2.3
Total votes		6,511,864	100.0
General election
Democratic	Fiona Ma	7,825,587	64.1
Republican	Greg Conlon	4,367,816	35.9
Total votes		12,202,403	100.0
Democratic hold			

=== Controller ===
Results by county: Yee: 50–60%; 60–70%; 70–80%; 80–90%; Roditis: 50–60%; 60–70%

Incumbent Democrat Betty Yee won re-election.

2018 California State Controller election
Primary election
Party	Candidate	Votes	%
Democratic	Betty Yee (incumbent)	4,033,197	62.1
Republican	Konstantinos Roditis	2,200,926	33.9
Peace and Freedom	Mary Lou Finley	261,876	4.0
Total votes		6,495,999	100.0
General election
Democratic	Betty Yee (incumbent)	8,013,067	65.5
Republican	Konstantinos Roditis	4,229,480	34.5
Total votes		12,242,547	100.0
Democratic hold			

=== Insurance Commissioner ===
Results by county: Lara: 50–60%; 60–70%; Poizner: 50–60%; 60–70%; 70–80%

Incumbent Democrat Dave Jones was term-limited and was succeeded by Democratic state senator Ricardo Lara.

2018 California Insurance Commissioner election
Primary election
Party	Candidate	Votes	%
No party preference	Steve Poizner	2,569,254	41.0
Democratic	Ricardo Lara	2,538,478	40.5
Democratic	Asif Mahmood	846,023	13.5
Peace and Freedom	Nathalie Hrizi	316,149	5.0
Total votes		6,269,904	100.0
General election
Democratic	Ricardo Lara	6,186,039	52.9
No party preference	Steve Poizner	5,515,293	47.1
Total votes		11,701,332	100.0
Democratic hold			

=== Superintendent of Public Instruction ===
Results by county: Thurmond: 50–60%; 60–70%; Tuck: 50–60%; 60–70%; 70–80%

Incumbent Tom Torlakson was term-limited and was succeeded by Democratic state assemblymember Tony Thurmond.

2018 California Superintendent of Public Instruction primary
Candidate	Votes	%
Marshall Tuck	2,223,784	37.0
Tony Thurmond	2,136,919	35.6
Lily Ploski	984,932	16.4
Steven Ireland	658,786	11.0
Douglas I. Vigil (write-in)	83	0.0
Thomas L. Williams (write-in)	66	0.0
Total votes	6,004,570	100.0

2018 California Superintendent of Public Instruction general election
Candidate	Votes	%
Tony Thurmond	5,385,912	50.9
Marshall Tuck	5,198,738	49.1
Total votes	10,584,650	100.0

== Board of Equalization ==
=== District 1 ===
Incumbent Republican George Runner was term-limited and was succeeded by Republican state senator Ted Gaines.

California's 1st Board of Equalization district election, 2018
Primary election
Party	Candidate	Votes	%
Democratic	Tom Hallinan	606,159	39.4
Republican	Ted Gaines	500,879	32.6
Republican	Connie Conway	283,477	18.4
Republican	David Evans	147,473	9.6
Total votes		1,537,988	100.0
General election
Republican	Ted Gaines	1,436,547	51.4
Democratic	Tom Hallinan	1,355,782	48.6
Total votes		2,792,329	100.0
Republican hold			

=== District 2 ===
Incumbent Democrat Fiona Ma left office to run for state treasurer and was succeeded by Democratic San Francisco supervisor Malia Cohen.

California's 2nd Board of Equalization district election, 2018
Primary election
Party	Candidate	Votes	%
Democratic	Malia Cohen	723,355	38.7
Republican	Mark Burns	502,143	26.9
Democratic	Cathleen Galgiani	480,887	25.7
Democratic	Barry Chang	163,102	8.7
Total votes		1,869,487	100.0
General election
Democratic	Malia Cohen	2,482,171	72.8
Republican	Mark Burns	927,949	27.2
Total votes		3,410,120	100.0
Democratic hold			

=== District 3 ===
Incumbent Democrat Jerome Horton was term-limited and was succeeded by Democratic Santa Monica city councilmember Tony Vazquez.

California's 3rd Board of Equalization district election, 2018
Primary election
Party	Candidate	Votes	%
Republican	G. Rick Marshall	335,570	26.4
Democratic	Tony Vazquez	255,988	20.2
Democratic	Cheryl C. Turner	214,916	16.9
Democratic	Scott Svonkin	170,254	13.4
Democratic	Nancy Pearlman	160,105	12.6
Democratic	Doug Kriegel	44,962	3.5
Democratic	Ben Pak	44,588	3.5
No party preference	Micheál "Me-Haul" O'Leary	43,084	3.4
Total votes		1,269,467	100.0
General election
Democratic	Tony Vazquez	1,895,972	69.2
Republican	G. Rick Marshall	815,829	30.1
Total votes		2,711,801	100.0
Democratic hold			

=== District 4 ===
Incumbent Republican Diane Harkey left office to run for the United States House of Representatives and was succeeded by Democratic former San Diego city councilmember and perennial candidate Mike Schaefer.

California's 4th Board of Equalization district election, 2018
Primary election
Party	Candidate	Votes	%
Republican	Joel Anderson	492,122	31.2
Democratic	Mike Schaefer	269,044	17.0
Republican	John F. Kelly	263,294	16.7
Democratic	David Dodson	234,534	14.9
Democratic	Ken Lopez-Maddox	228,811	14.5
Republican	Jim Stieringer	58,642	3.7
Republican	Nader F. Shahatit	32,105	2.0
Total votes		1,578,552	100.0
General election
Democratic	Mike Schaefer	1,559,373	52.2
Republican	Joel Anderson	1,427,566	47.8
Total votes		2,986,939	100.0
Democratic gain from Republican			

== State Supreme Court ==
Two justices on the Supreme Court of California were facing retention in 2018.

=== Justice Corrigan retention ===
Results by county For: 60–70%; 70–80%

Carol Corrigan was first appointed by Governor Arnold Schwarzenegger in December 2005 to relace Justice Janice Rogers Brown.

California Supreme Court Associate Justice Corrigan retention election
Choice	Votes	%
For	6,539,085	69.77
Against	2,833,205	30.23
Total	9,372,290	100.00
Source: California Secretary of State

=== Justice Kruger retention ===
Results by county For: 50–60%; 60–70%; 70–80%; 80–90%; Against: 50–60%

Leondra Kruger was appointed by Governor Jerry Brown in November 2014 to replace Justice Joyce Kennard.

California Supreme Court Associate Justice Kruger retention election
Choice	Votes	%
For	6,698,643	72.77
Against	2,506,418	27.23
Total	9,205,061	100.00
Source: California Secretary of State

== Statewide ballot propositions ==
=== Primary election ===
Since the passage of a law in November 2011, state primary elections may only feature propositions placed on the ballot by the state legislature.

2018 California propositions (June)
Name	Description	Votes				Type
Name	Description	Yes	%	No	%	Type
Proposition 68	Issues $4 billion in bonds for parks, environmental protection, and water infrastructure.	3,808,000	57.35	2,831,899	42.65	Bond proposition
Proposition 69	Mandates that revenues generated by the Road Repair and Accountability Act (2017) can only be used for transportation purposes.	5,386,972	81.01	1,262,455	18.99	Legislatively referred constitutional amendment
Proposition 70	Requires a one-time two-thirds majority vote to use revenue from the cap-and-trade program.	2,251,740	35.30	4,126,406	64.70	Legislatively referred constitutional amendment
Proposition 71	Moves the effective date of passed ballot measures from the day after the election to the fifth day after the certification of the results.	4,995,361	77.63	1,439,686	22.37	Legislatively referred constitutional amendment
Proposition 72	Excludes rainwater capture systems completed on or after January 1, 2019, from property tax assessments.	5,537,110	84.58	1,009,853	15.42	Legislatively referred constitutional amendment
Source: California Secretary of State

=== General election ===
Twelve state propositions were originally approved for the November ballot, but Proposition 9 was removed from the ballot by order of the California Supreme Court.

2018 California propositions (November)
Name	Description	Votes				Type
Name	Description	Yes	%	No	%	Type
Proposition 1	Issues $4 billion in bonds for affordable housing programs and veterans' home loans.	6,751,018	56.22	5,258,157	43.78	Bond proposition
Proposition 2	Authorizes state to use revenue from millionaire's tax for $2 billion in bonds for homelessness prevention housing.	7,662,528	63.43	4,417,327	36.57	Legislatively referred state statute
Proposition 3	Issues $8.877 billion in bonds for water-related infrastructure and environmental projects.	5,879,836	49.35	6,034,991	50.65	Citizen-initiated state statute
Proposition 4	Authorizes $1.5 billion in bonds to funding construction at various hospitals providing children's health care.	7,551,298	62.69	4,494,143	37.31	Citizen-initiated state statute
Proposition 5	Revises process for homebuyers who are age 55 or older or severely disabled to transfer their tax assessments.	4,813,251	40.22	7,152,993	59.78	Citizen-initiated constitutional amendment
Proposition 6	Repeals 2017's gas tax and vehicle fee increases and requires public vote on future increases.	5,283,222	43.18	6,952,081	56.82	Citizen-initiated constitutional amendment
Proposition 7	Authorizes legislature to provide for permanent daylight saving time, subject to approval by the U.S. Congress.	7,167,315	59.75	4,828,564	40.25	Legislatively referred state statute
Proposition 8	Requires dialysis clinics to issue refunds to their patients if their revenue exceeds 115% of their costs of direct patient care and health care quality improvements.	4,845,264	40.07	7,247,917	59.93	Citizen-initiated state statute
Proposition 10	Allows local governments to regulate rent on any type of housing by repealing the Costa–Hawkins Rental Housing Act.	4,949,543	40.57	7,251,443	59.43	Citizen-initiated state statute
Proposition 11	Requires private-sector emergency ambulance employees to remain on call during breaks, be trained in certain emergency situations, and receive paid mental health services from their employers.	7,181,116	59.63	4,861,831	40.37	Citizen-initiated state statute
Proposition 12	Requires meats and eggs to be produced only from farm animals that are confined in areas greater than a specific amount of space.	7,516,095	62.65	4,481,267	37.35	Citizen-initiated state statute
Source: California Secretary of State

==== Removed from the ballot ====
- Proposition 9: Division of California into Three States
  Also known as the Cal 3 measure, this would have divided California into three U.S. states, subject to approval by the U.S. Congress. It was removed from the ballot by the California Supreme Court on July 18, 2018, for further legal review. On September 12, the court affirmed their removal of the measure along with banning any such measure to be on the ballot in the future.

== See also ==
- Aaron Persky, a Santa Clara judge recalled in 2018
- Mister America, a fictional film about the 2018 election for district attorney of San Bernardino County
