= California Proposition 51 =

California Proposition 51 may refer to:

- California Proposition 51 (2002)
- California Proposition 51 (2016)
