= 2016 California Proposition 52 =

Proposition 52
- Medi-Cal Hospital Fee Program

Results
Choice	Votes	%
Yes	9,427,714	70.07%
No	4,026,710	29.93%
Valid votes	13,454,424	92.09%
Invalid or blank votes	1,156,085	7.91%
Total votes	14,610,509	100.00%
Registered voters/turnout	19,411,771	75.27%
County results
Yes
50–60%
60–70%
70–80%

Proposition 52 is a California ballot proposition that passed on the November 8, 2016 ballot, regarding indefinitely extending an existing charge on hospitals to fund Medi-Cal health care services. The charge, called the "Hospital Quality Assurance Fee", has been collected since 2009 with temporary renewals and was scheduled to expire on January 1, 2018.

Arguments for the measure stated that the charge helps to secure more than $4 billion in federal matching funds annually. Additionally, the measure would help curtail the diversion of some of the funds to things other than Medi-Cal. Arguments against the measure stated that it lacks oversight and that there would still be no guarantee that funds would be spent on healthcare.
