= 2016 California Proposition 54 =

Proposition 54
- Legislative Procedure Requirements

Results
Choice	Votes	%
Yes	8,607,266	65.37%
No	4,559,903	34.63%
Valid votes	13,167,169	90.12%
Invalid or blank votes	1,443,340	9.88%
Total votes	14,610,509	100.00%
Registered voters/turnout	19,411,771	75.27%
- County results Yes 60–70% 50–60%

Proposition 54 is a California ballot proposition that passed on the November 8, 2016 ballot. It requires the recording and posting of videos of public meetings of the State Legislature. The measure requires the recordings to be posted on the internet within 24 hours of a meeting, available online for at least 72 hours before a bill can be passed, and downloadable for at least 20 years. The measure also allows members of the public to record meetings.

Arguments for the measure stated that it would increase transparency in the Legislature and provide time for bills to be reviewed by the public before going to vote. Arguments against the measure stated that it would slow down the legislative process, and give lobbying efforts time to campaign after a bill has already been completed.

Proposition 54 was approved by voters.
