= 2018 California Proposition 70 =

Proposition 70
- June 5, 2018
- Requires Legislative Supermajority Vote Approving Use Of Cap-And-Trade Reserve Fund

Results
Choice	Votes	%
Yes	2,229,468	37.31%
No	3,746,434	62.69%
Total votes	5,975,902	100.00%
County results
Against
70–80%
60–70%
50–60%

Proposition 70, also known as Prop 70, was a California ballot proposition and proposed state constitution amendment intended to make it a requirement, starting in 2024, for revenue generated from cap and trade programs to be gathered in a special fund. After the money had been collected, the state legislature would have to have a two-thirds majority vote to spend the funds. Opponents of the proposition argued that it will embolden anti-environment special interest groups since the two-thirds majority requirement would lead to more legislative gridlock. Supporters of the proposition argued that it will make sure that the money is spent on important projects and is spent properly. It failed in the June 2018 California primary elections. Supporters of the proposed amendment include Jerry Brown, who was governor at the time, the California Chamber of Commerce and the Rural County Representatives of California. Opponents of the proposed amendment include the California Democratic Party, Center for Biological Diversity, NextGen America and Fossil Free California.

== Results ==
Result	Votes	Percentage
Yes	2,229,468	37.31
No	3,746,434	62.69
