= 2016 California Proposition 50 =

Proposition 50, also known as the California Suspension of Legislators Amendment and Prop 50, was a California ballot proposition and proposed state constitution amendment intended to require a two-thirds vote in the respective chamber of the state legislature to suspend a state senator or assembly member. It also withheld the salaries and benefits of the suspended legislator. It passed in the June 2016 California primary election. The amendment was proposed to the California State Legislature by State Senator Darrell Steinberg. Proponents of the amendment include League of Women Voters of California, League of Women Voters San Luis Obispo County and California Forward. Opponents of the amendment include Joel Anderson and Jon Fleischman, a well-known Republican blogger.

Proposition 50 Results by county Yes: 80–90%; 70–80%; 60–70%

Results

Result	Votes	Percentage
Yes	5,601,054	75.60
No	1,808,291	24.40
