= 2018 California Proposition 6 =

Failed referendum to repeal a 2017 fuel tax

Proposition 6
- Eliminates Certain Road Repair And Transportation Funding. Requires Certain Fuel Taxes And Vehicle Fees be Approved by the Electorate. Initiative Constitutional Amendment.

Results
| Choice | Votes | % |
|---|---|---|
| Yes | 5,283,222 | 43.18% |
| No | 6,952,081 | 56.82% |
| Valid votes | 12,235,303 | 100.00% |
| Invalid or blank votes | 0 | 0.00% |
| Total votes | 12,235,303 | 100.00% |
| Registered voters/turnout | 19,696,371 | 62.12% |

California Proposition 6 was a measure that was submitted to California voters as part of the November 2018 election. The ballot measure proposed a repeal of the Road Repair and Accountability Act (a fuel tax), which is also known as Senate Bill 1 (SB 1). The measure failed with about 57% of the voters against and 43% in favor.

== Road Repair and Accountability Act ==
On April 6, 2017, the California State Legislature passed the Road Repair and Accountability Act (RRAA) by a two-thirds margin, raising taxes on gasoline by 12¢ per gallon, taxes on diesel by 20¢ per gallon tax, and it raised annual vehicle registration fees by $25–175. The registration fee increase ranges depending on the vehicle's market value an estimated 86% of vehicles would see an increase of $25 to $50.

This bill aims to invest $5.4 billion annually in California's transportation systems. Every county in California is scheduled to receive infrastructure investments from the RRAA. State transportation infrastructure receives roughly half of the funding, with the other half going to local agencies. 17 projects have been completed under the RRAA, with scheduled work on 156 projects at various stages of completion as of September 2018. Some California residents complained about how the tax affects them.

== Campaign ==
The ballot initiative “Repeal the Gas Car Tax” signature drive was led by Carl DeMaio. DeMaio had previously orchestrated the recall of California State Senator Josh Newman because of his vote for SB1. Republican politicians Paul Ryan, Steve Scalise and Kevin McCarthy have contributed money to the repeal campaign. The National Federation of Independent Business has endorsed repealing the gas tax, by supporting Proposition 6. The California Chamber of Commerce went on record in July 2018 opposing Proposition 6. As of November 1, 2018, construction contractors, labor unions, and civic organizations had donated $46,465,916 to the campaign against Proposition 6. The Total amount of reported contributions for Proposition 6 as of November 1, 2018 is $5,078,484.

Supporters gathered more than 940,000 signatures statewide, which exceeded the minimum requirement of 584,000 signatures for the measure to be on the November 2018 voter ballot. If passed by voters, the Proposition 6 ballot initiative would have repealed the gas tax increase, repealed the car registration fee increase, and mandated any future gas tax increase be approved only by voters. The ballot initiative was supported by John H. Cox (Republican candidate for California governor) and opposed by Gavin Newsom (Democratic then-candidate, future California governor) and Jerry Brown (then-current California governor).

== Wording dispute ==
A citizens initiative drive stating "Repeal The Gas Tax" signed by 940,000 voters qualified to be placed on the November 2018 ballot. California Attorney General Becerra twice modified the wording due to a court order. The wording officially on the ballot states:

"Eliminates Recently Enacted Road Repair and Transportation Funding by Repealing Revenues Dedicated For Those Purposes. Requires Any Measure to Enact Certain Vehicle Fuel Taxes and Vehicle Fees Be Submitted to and Approved By the Electorate. Initiative Constitutional Amendment."

Independent ballot reference site Ballotpedia lists out Proposition 6 in detail description as well as both pro and negative consequences:

"A yes vote supports this initiative to: Repeal fuel tax increases and vehicle fees that were enacted in 2017, including the Road Repair and Accountability Act of 2017 (RRAA) and require voter approval (via ballot propositions) for the California State Legislature to impose, increase, or extend fuel taxes or vehicle fees in the future.

A no vote opposes this initiative, thus: Keeping the fuel tax increases and vehicle fees that were enacted in 2017, including the Road Repair and Accountability Act of 2017 (RRAA), in place and allowing the state legislature to continue to impose, increase, or extend fuel taxes or vehicle fees through a two-thirds vote of each chamber and without voter approval."

== Polling ==
The polling results below based on which Proposition 6 wording utilized. Some polls taken below are based on citizen signature initiative description "Repeal The Gas Tax" and other polls based on final description on the voter ballot. Reference shows poll using citizen initiative description instead of final wording that appears on the ballot.

| Poll source | Date(s) administered | Sample size | Margin of error | Yes (Repeal) | No (Retain) | Undecided |
|---|---|---|---|---|---|---|
| YouGov | October 10–24, 2018 | 2,178 | ± 3.1% | 34% | 47% | 19% |
| Public Policy Institute of California | October 18–20, 2018 | 1,704 | ± 3.3% | 41% | 48% | 11% |
| Thomas Partners Strategies | October 18–20, 2018 | 1,068 | ± 3.0% | 36% | 42% | 21% |
| Emerson College | October 17–19, 2018 | 671 | ± 4.1% | 49% | 31% | 20% |
| SurveyUSA | October 12–14, 2018 | 762 | ± 4.9% | 58% | 29% | 15% |
| Thomas Partners Strategies | October 12–14, 2018 | 1,068 | ± 3.0% | 35% | 36% | 29% |
| Thomas Partners Strategies | October 5–7, 2018 | 1,068 | ± 3.5% | 29% | 42% | 30% |
| Thomas Partners Strategies | September 21–23, 2018 | 1,068 | ± 3.5% | 47% | 28% | 25% |
| Public Policy Institute of California | September 9–18, 2018 | 1,710 | ± 3.5% | 39% | 52% | 8% |
| Thomas Partners Strategies | September 14–16, 2018 | 1,040 | ± 3.5% | 44% | 27% | 29% |
| Thomas Partners Strategies | September 7–9, 2018 | 1,227 | ± 3.3% | 46% | 24% | 31% |

== Results ==
Proposition 6
| Choice | Votes | % |
|---|---|---|
| Yes | 5,283,222 | 43.2% |
| No | 6,952,081 | 56.8% |
| Total votes | 12,235,303 | 100% |

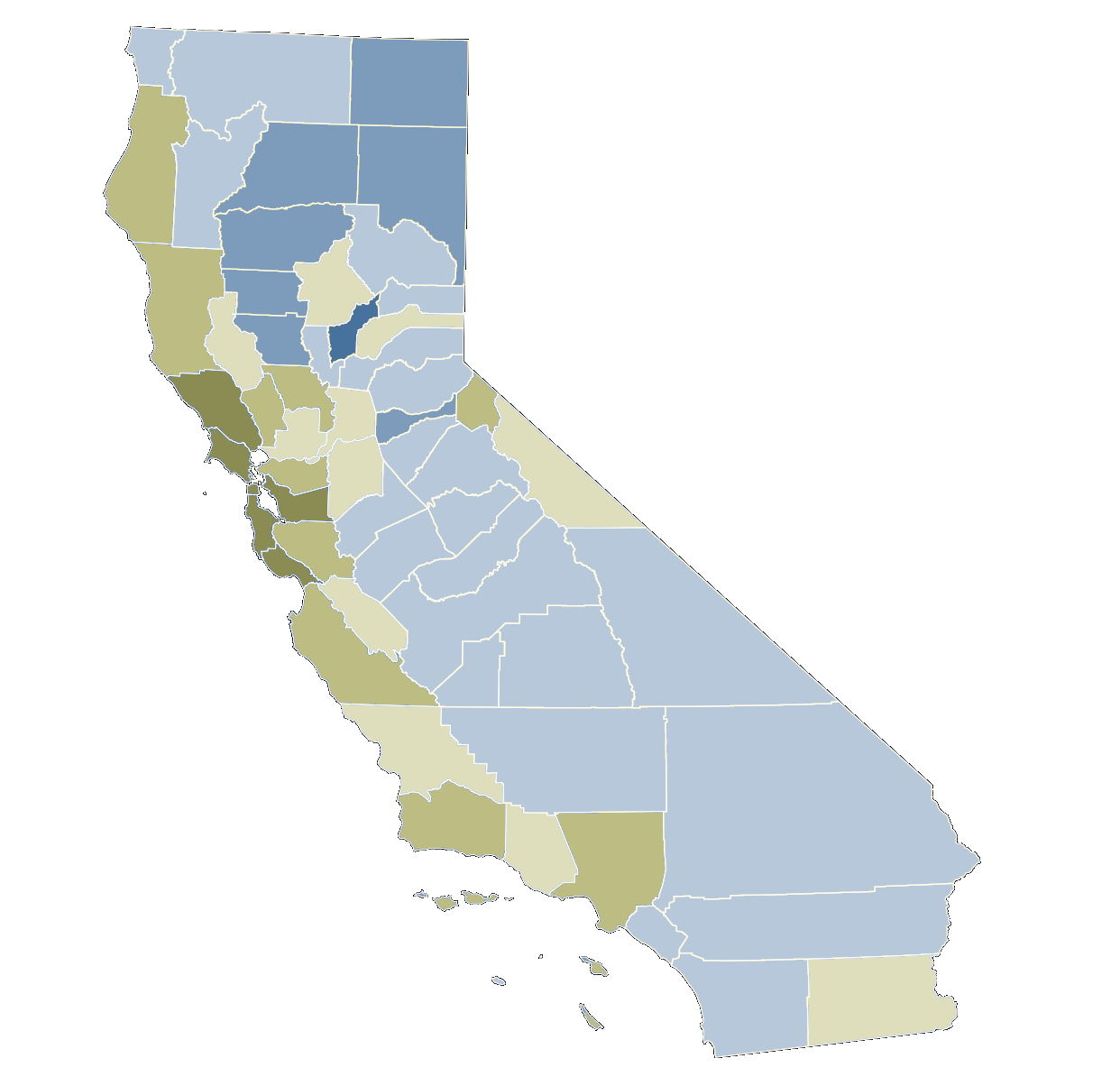
Results by county

=== Results by county ===
| | YES | | NO | | Total votes |
| County | # | % | # | % | # |
|---|---|---|---|---|---|
| Alameda | 139,609 | 24.7% | 424,863 | 75.3% | 564,472 |
| Alpine | 183 | 30.3% | 420 | 69.7% | 603 |
| Amador | 10,423 | 60.1% | 6,928 | 39.9% | 17,351 |
| Butte | 41,925 | 48.2% | 45,052 | 51.8% | 86,977 |
| Calaveras | 12,689 | 59.8% | 8,518 | 40.2% | 21,207 |
| Colusa | 3,506 | 61.9% | 2,161 | 38.1% | 5,667 |
| Contra Costa | 140,839 | 34.5% | 267,455 | 65.5% | 408,294 |
| Del Norte | 4,248 | 52.3% | 3,878 | 47.7% | 8,126 |
| El Dorado | 50,228 | 57.5% | 37,080 | 42.5% | 87,308 |
| Fresno | 130,617 | 52.7% | 117,159 | 47.3% | 247,776 |
| Glenn | 5,128 | 62.5% | 3,083 | 37.5% | 8,211 |
| Humboldt | 17,096 | 33.2% | 34,412 | 66.8% | 51,508 |
| Imperial | 15,228 | 46.6% | 17,457 | 53.4% | 32,685 |
| Inyo | 3,554 | 50.3% | 3,514 | 49.7% | 7,068 |
| Kern | 112,506 | 56.5% | 86,540 | 43.5% | 199,046 |
| Kings | 17,626 | 59.2% | 12,147 | 40.8% | 29,773 |
| Lake | 9,333 | 45.3% | 11,262 | 54.7% | 20,595 |
| Lassen | 5,897 | 66.3% | 2,996 | 33.7% | 8,893 |
| Los Angeles | 1,119,062 | 38.7% | 1,773,117 | 61.3% | 2,892,179 |
| Madera | 22,779 | 59.9% | 15,229 | 40.1% | 38,008 |
| Marin | 28,814 | 23.0% | 96,414 | 77.0% | 125,228 |
| Mariposa | 4,488 | 55.4% | 3,610 | 44.6% | 8,098 |
| Mendocino | 10,431 | 32.1% | 22,017 | 67.9% | 32,448 |
| Merced | 28,027 | 48.1% | 30,266 | 51.9% | 58,293 |
| Modoc | 2,169 | 64.2% | 1,212 | 35.8% | 3,381 |
| Mono | 1,929 | 40.6% | 2,822 | 59.4% | 4,751 |
| Monterey | 40,524 | 35.5% | 73,530 | 64.5% | 114,054 |
| Napa | 19,842 | 36.1% | 35,170 | 63.9% | 55,012 |
| Nevada | 26,364 | 49.5% | 26,878 | 50.5% | 53,242 |
| Orange | 577,900 | 54.5% | 482,319 | 45.5% | 1,060,219 |
| Placer | 97,330 | 56.4% | 75,244 | 43.6% | 172,574 |
| Plumas | 5,013 | 55.2% | 4,065 | 44.8% | 9,078 |
| Riverside | 358,259 | 56.5% | 275,593 | 43.5% | 633,852 |
| Sacramento | 229,100 | 45.1% | 278,560 | 54.9% | 507,660 |
| San Benito | 8,658 | 43.7% | 11,163 | 56.3% | 19,821 |
| San Bernardino | 300,713 | 56.6% | 231,044 | 43.4% | 531,757 |
| San Diego | 578,961 | 50.9% | 557,432 | 49.1% | 1,136,393 |
| San Francisco | 60,002 | 17.1% | 291,660 | 82.9% | 351,662 |
| San Joaquin | 93,560 | 48.9% | 97,945 | 51.1% | 191,505 |
| San Luis Obispo | 55,945 | 45.4% | 67,353 | 54.6% | 123,298 |
| San Mateo | 78,232 | 28.1% | 200,314 | 71.9% | 278,546 |
| Santa Barbara | 58,435 | 38.6% | 92,793 | 61.4% | 151,228 |
| Santa Clara | 189,463 | 31.8% | 406,249 | 68.2% | 595,712 |
| Santa Cruz | 30,164 | 25.9% | 86,518 | 74.1% | 116,682 |
| Shasta | 41,927 | 61.0% | 26,755 | 39.0% | 68,682 |
| Sierra | 852 | 52.4% | 775 | 47.6% | 1,627 |
| Siskiyou | 9,570 | 54.5% | 7,978 | 45.5% | 17,548 |
| Solano | 62,362 | 43.5% | 81,017 | 56.5% | 143,379 |
| Sonoma | 59,166 | 28.6% | 147,467 | 71.4% | 206,633 |
| Stanislaus | 77,367 | 50.3% | 76,364 | 49.7% | 153,731 |
| Sutter | 17,708 | 60.8% | 11,406 | 39.2% | 29,114 |
| Tehama | 12,546 | 61.4% | 7,897 | 38.6% | 20,443 |
| Trinity | 2,665 | 51.0% | 2,558 | 49.0% | 5,223 |
| Tulare | 56,848 | 57.9% | 41,264 | 42.1% | 98,112 |
| Tuolumne | 12,914 | 55.3% | 10,439 | 44.7% | 23,353 |
| Ventura | 146,052 | 47.8% | 159,641 | 52.2% | 305,693 |
| Yolo | 24,746 | 34.1% | 47,815 | 65.9% | 72,561 |
| Yuba | 11,700 | 61.7% | 7,263 | 38.3% | 18,963 |
| Totals | 5,283,222 | 43.2% | 6,952,081 | 56.8% | 12,235,303 |
