= 2018 California Proposition 12 =

Ballot measure on space requirements for farm animals

Proposition 12
- Farm Animal Minimum Space

Results
Choice	Votes	%
Yes	7,516,095	62.65%
No	4,481,267	37.35%
Valid votes	11,997,362	100.00%
Invalid or blank votes	0	0.00%
Total votes	11,997,362	100.00%
Registered voters/turnout	19,696,371	60.91%
County results
For
70%–80%
60%–70%
50%–60%
Against
70%–80%
60%–70%
50%–60%

Proposition 12 ("Prop 12") was a California ballot proposition in that state's general election on November 6, 2018. The measure was self-titled the Prevention of Cruelty to Farm Animals Act. The measure passed, by a vote of about 63% Yes to 37% No.

The proposition establishes new minimum requirements on farmers to provide more space for egg-laying hens, breeding pigs, and calves raised for veal. California businesses will be banned from selling eggs or uncooked pork or veal that came from animals housed in ways that did not meet these requirements.

The ballot measure aimed to build upon and strengthen the requirements of a previous ballot measure, the 2008 California Proposition 2, which prohibited battery cages and gestation crates for animals in California, and required that pigs, hens, and calves be able to spread their wings or limbs and turn around. The California legislature in 2010 passed AB 1437, which required all shell eggs sold in the state to meet the same requirements, including those produced elsewhere. Proposition 12 closed loopholes in these laws by requiring the same for all eggs sold in the state, regardless of the form it was sold in (i.e. both shell eggs and liquid eggs), and the state where it was produced. However, not all pork has to comply with the law: only whole uncooked pork cuts must comply, while other pork products, such as ground pork, do not. This means that about 42% of the state's pork market is exempt from the law's requirements.

== Ballot label summary ==
The California Secretary of State's summary from the Official Voter Information Guide of Proposition 12 is as follows:

ESTABLISHES NEW STANDARDS FOR CONFINEMENT OF SPECIFIED FARM ANIMALS; BANS SALE OF NONCOMPLYING PRODUCTS. INITIATIVE STATUTE. Establishes minimum requirements for confining certain farm animals. Prohibits sales of meat and egg products from animals confined in noncomplying manner. Fiscal Impact: Potential decrease in state income tax revenues from farm businesses, likely not more than several million dollars annually. State costs up to $10 million annually to enforce the measure.

== Support ==
The Humane Society of the United States (HSUS) and other animal protection groups argued that confining animals in small cages is cruel, and that Prop 12 was needed to improve animal welfare, including by mandating cage-free conditions for egg-laying hens. Prop 12 applies equally to both animals raised in California and those raised elsewhere for the California marketplace. Prop 12 was endorsed by the Center for Food Safety because research indicates that caging farm animals increases the spread of food-borne pathogens like Salmonella.

The following organizations endorsed Proposition 12:

- Humane Society of the United States
- ASPCA (American Society for the Prevention of Cruelty to Animals)
- Mercy for Animals
- The Humane League
- Compassion in World Farming
- Animal Legal Defense Fund
- Animal Equality
- Animal Protection and Rescue League (APRL)
- Compassion Over Killing
- In Defense of Animals (IDA)
- San Francisco SPCA
- San Diego Humane Society
- Marin Humane Society
- Center for Food Safety
- Organic Consumers Association
- Center for Biological Diversity
- Sierra Club California
- United Farm Workers
- Farm Sanctuary
- World Animal Protection
- Animal Welfare Institute
- California Animal Welfare Association

The following newspapers endorsed it:

- Los Angeles Times
- The Mercury News (San Jose)
- The Monterey Herald
- San Francisco Bay Guardian
- East Bay Express
- East Bay Times
- Marin Independent Journal
- San Diego Free Press
- Santa Cruz Sentinel

== Opposition ==
The American Veal Association argued that Prop 12 would create unnecessary regulations and that the veal industry was already well on its way to phasing out crates. Ken Klippen of the National Association of Egg Farmers told Fox News that the measure would take away consumer choice and that the motivation behind the measure was to push consumers towards a vegan diet.

Groups such as PETA opposed the measure because they considered it insufficient.

The following organizations opposed Proposition 12:

- Association of California Egg Farmers
- National Association of Egg Farmers
- American Veal Association
- California Pork Producers Association
- People for the Ethical Treatment of Animals (PETA)
- National Pork Producers Council
- California Farm Bureau Federation
- Protect the Harvest
- Humane Farming Association
- Friends of Animals
- Showing Animals Respect and Kindness (SHARK)
- Action for Animals

The following newspapers opposed it:

- The Bakersfield Californian
- Los Angeles Daily News/The San Bernardino Sun
- San Francisco Chronicle
- The Fresno Bee/The Sacramento Bee
- Orange County Register
- The Press Democrat (Santa Rosa)
- The San Diego Union-Tribune
- The Tribune (San Luis Obispo)

== Election results ==
The results of the vote were 62.65% YES to 37.35% NO.

Proposition 12
Choice	Votes	%
For	7,516,095	62.65
Against	4,481,267	37.35
Total	11,997,362	100.00
Registered voters/turnout		19,696,371

== Effects and legal challenges ==
The egg industry has largely complied with the law. Despite the resounding success at the ballot box, the pork industry unsuccessfully sued to block implementation of the law. In June 2021, the Supreme Court of the United States rejected a lawsuit from the North American Meat Institute to stop the law. The Meat Institute had argued that Prop 12 violated the Commerce Clause of the US Constitution, but this argument was rejected because Prop 12 holds in-state and out-of-state producers to the same standard. The law was implemented on January 1, 2022.

On January 25, 2022, a judge ordered a temporary halt to enforcement of the prohibition on pork from gestation crates, for 180 days, pending development of final regulations by the California Department of Food and Agriculture, to give producers more time to comply. The CDFA also needed more time to comply with a lawsuit filed by animal activists, who wanted to increase stringency of the regulations.

The American Farm Bureau Federation and the National Pork Producers Council again asked the Supreme Court to overturn the law, in another lawsuit similar to the ones that were previously rejected. On May 11, 2023, the Supreme Court of the United States upheld the law, in National Pork Producers Council v. Ross.

As of 2024, House Republicans are attempting to overrule Proposition 12 through the United States farm bill.

As of May 2026, the U.S. House passed the Farm, Food, and National Security Act of 2026, which includes the "Save Our Bacon" provision barring states of regulating in-state meat sales based on out-of-state production methods - a change that would nullify Proposition 12. The bill has since advanced to the Senate. As of June 2026, the Senate draft of the United States farm bill is still under review. Many of the advocates of the Save Our Bacon Act lost their re-election campaigns in the 2026 United States elections.

== See also ==
- List of California ballot propositions 2010–19
- List of California ballot propositions
- Elections in California
