= 2018 California Proposition 5 =

Proposition 5, also known as Prop 5 or Property Tax Transfer Initiative, was a 2018 California ballot proposition intended to allow people buying houses who are severely disabled or 55 and over to transfer their tax assessments from their previous house to their new house regardless of the new house's market value or the location of the new house. It failed in the November 2018 California elections. The ballot initiative was formed by the California Association of Realtors. Opponents of the initiative included the California Teachers Association and Asm. David Chiu (politician).

== Result ==
Proposition 5 Results by county No: 70–80%; 60–70%; 50–60%

Result	Votes	Percentage
Yes	4,813,251	40.22
No	7,152,993	59.78
