= Scott Svonkin =

American politician

Scott Svonkin is an American politician, formerly working as an elected Trustee of the Los Angeles Community College District (LACCD). Svonkin was elected as one of the seven trustees of LACCD in on May 17, 2011. He made history serving three consecutive terms as President of the Board.

== Early life ==
Svonkin is a native of Los Angeles County and the son of a public school teacher. Svonkin fell in love with the sport of tennis at a young age. At 15 he attended the United States Tennis Association’s officiating school and was certified as an umpire. He was the youngest tennis umpire in the nation. By the age of 16, Svonkin umpired his first tennis match at the U.S. Open. Svonkin went on to umpire 8 years at the U.S. Open. During that time “Martina Navratilova smiled at him. John McEnroe screamed at him. When he called a foot fault on Hana Mandilkova, a fan threatened to kill him." As a child Svonkin suffered from asthma, which caused him to miss a great deal of school. In 2006, the Los Angeles Times featured Svonkin as an example of a person that was unable to obtain health insurance because of his childhood illness. “High-risk enrollees include people like Scott Svonkin, who make time for at least one tennis match each week…. After suffering debilitating bouts of asthma as a child, he clearly relishes the ability to exercise. He credits medications that were not around when he was growing up. But the very drugs that have allowed him to breathe freely for years may also cost him his health coverage.”

== Education ==
Svonkin attended public schools. He attended Pasadena City College where he served two terms at the Student Trustee on the Pasadena City College Board of Trustees. Svonkin then transferred to California State University, Northridge where he earned a Bachelor of Arts Degree in Political Science.

== Public service ==
Svonkin has a long history of service to the greater Los Angeles community. Outside of his duties as a Trustee of LACCD, Svonkin previously served as an aide to then City Councilmember to West Hollywood Councilmember Jeffrey Prang, the Chairman of the Los Angeles County Insurance Commission, and on the Supervisory Committee of the California Credit Union. Also, Svonkin is the past president of the Los Angeles County School Trustees Association.

Svonkin began his public service as the Student Member of the Pasadena City College Board of Trustees. He served on the staff of Los Angeles Mayor Tom Bradley, a Deputy City Councilmember for the City of West Hollywood (1998 to 2001), as the Chief of Staff to California State Assemblyman Paul Koretz (2001 to 2002), and as a civilian member of the Los Angeles County Sheriff's Department.

Svonkin also previously served on the Los Angeles Valley College Foundation Board, the California State University, Northridge Legislative Advisory Council, the LA PROSPER Board of the Los Angeles Community College District, the Center for the Southern California Studies Advisory Board, the Los Angeles Unified School District Advisory Council for District Four, the Children’s Hospital of LA Huckleberry Foundation, the California Respiratory Board.

== Other elected offices ==
Svonkin first ran for elected office in 2002, when the San Fernando Valley attempted to secede from Los Angeles and form its own city. Svonkin won a seat on the planned San Fernando Valley City Council; however the secession measure failed and a new city was not created.

Svonkin served as a member of the San Gabriel Unified School District from 2007 to 2011, when he was elected to the LACCD. Svonkin was a key vote in approving a Project Labor Agreement that required half of the jobs created by the $65 million Measure A bond be union labor.

In 2018, Svonkin ran for a seat on the California Board of Equalization. He received 13.4% of the vote.

== Business life ==
Svonkin was the president of his own small business, Svonkin Consulting, a marketing, communications and public affairs firm. Before that he worked for Prudential Insurance for six and a half years. While at Prudential, Svonkin received the company’s Community Champions Rising Star award for his commitment to helping others.

== Political involvement ==
Svonkin is a politically active member of the Democratic Party. He has been an elected member of the Los Angeles County Democratic Party Central Committee and an appointed member of the California Democratic Party Central Committee.

Svonkin attended and participated in the Democratic National Committee Conventions in 1996 and 2000. In 1996, Svonkin wore a custom made “Clinton-Gore” yarmulke to the DNC Convention. The Smithsonian requested the yarmulke for its political memorabilia collection and Svonkin obliged.

== Family life ==
Svonkin has a daughter, Rose, and a son, Sam.
