= 2016 California Proposition 51 =

Proposition 51
- K-12 and Community College Facilities

Results
Choice	Votes	%
Yes	7,516,142	55.18%
No	6,104,294	44.82%
Valid votes	13,620,436	93.22%
Invalid or blank votes	990,073	6.78%
Total votes	14,610,509	100.00%
Registered voters/turnout	19,411,771	75.27%
County results
Yes
50–60%
60–70%
No
50–60%
60–70%

Proposition 51 is a California ballot proposition that passed on the November 8, 2016 ballot, regarding $9 billion in bonds to fund construction and improvement of K-12 and community college facilities. The measure designates $7 billion for K-12 projects falling under four types of projects (new construction, modernization, career technical education facilities, and charter school facilities), and $2 billion for any facility project for community colleges. No other bond measures related to education have been on the California ballot since 2006.

There was bipartisan support for Prop 51. Arguments for the measure stated that K-12 and community college classrooms and other facilities are in need of improvement and repair to meet health and safety standards. Arguments against the measure stated that it did not guarantee equitable distribution of the bond money. The opposition discontinued their fundraising in June 2016.

A September 2016 poll by the Public Policy Institute of California showed that 47% of likely voters supported Proposition 51, 43% opposed it, and 10% did not know how they would vote.
