= 2018 West Virginia Amendment 1 =

Referendum to remove abortion protections

- November 6, 2018
- To amend the West Virginia Constitution to clarify that nothing in the Constitution of West Virginia secures or protects a right to abortion or requires the funding of abortion.

Results
Choice	Votes	%
Yes	297,042	51.72%
No	277,330	48.28%
Valid votes	574,372	100.00%
Invalid or blank votes	0	0.00%
Total votes	574,372	100.00%
County results
Yes
50–60%
60–70%
No
50–60%
60–70%

The 2018 West Virginia No Constitutional Right to Abortion Amendment, also known as Amendment 1, was a legislatively referred constitutional amendment that appeared on the ballot in the U.S. state of West Virginia on November 6, 2018. The measure amended the Constitution of West Virginia to remove any and all protections for abortion access and prohibited state funding for abortions. It was approved by 52% of voters.

The amendment did not prohibit abortion itself in West Virginia. The measure overturned Women's Health Center of West Virginia v. Panepinto, a 1993 state supreme court case which required the state to use Medicaid funds for abortions when necessary. In September 2022, following the Dobbs decision, West Virginia lawmakers passed a near-total abortion ban.

== Endorsements ==
Yes

Organizations

- West Virginia Republican Party
No

U.S. senators

- Joe Manchin, former U.S. Senator (2010-2025), former Governor of West Virginia (2005-2010), and former West Virginia Secretary of State (2001-2005)

Newspapers and other media

- Charleston Gazette-Mail
- The Herald-Dispatch

== Results ==
West Virginia Amendment 1
Choice	Votes	%
For	297,042	51.72
Against	277,330	48.28
Total	574,372	100.00
