= 2018 California Proposition 4 =

Proposition 4, also known as Prop 4 or Children's Hospital Bond Initiative, was a California ballot proposition intended to approve bonds amounting to $1.5 billion to be used for the creation and managing of children's hospitals. It passed in the November 2018 California elections. The campaign in support of the initiative was led by Yes 4 Children's Hospitals, also called Yes on Proposition 4. The campaign was sponsored by the California Children's Hospital Association. The California Teachers Association was a supporter of the initiative. No major organizations or politicians were vocal about the proposition.

== Results ==
Proposition 4 Results by county Yes: 70–80%; 60–70%; 50–60%; No: 50–60%

Result	Votes	Percentage
Yes	7,551,298	62.69
No	4,494,143	37.31
