= 2018 California Proposition 1 =

2018 California ballot proposition

Proposition 1, also known as Prop 1 or Housing Programs and Veterans' Loans Bond, was a California ballot proposition which was intended to approve $4,000,000,000 in general obligation bonds for projects related to housing and housing loans for veterans. It passed in the November 2018 California elections. The campaign in support of the proposition was run by Affordable Housing Now which was also known as Yes on Prop 1. Supporters of the proposition included Lieutenant Governor Gavin Newsom, State Senator Bill Dodd, the California Democratic Party, the California Hospital Association, California Forward, the California Labor Federation, United Farm Workers, the San Francisco Democratic Party and California Community Foundation. There were no major opposition efforts made towards the proposition.

== Results ==
Proposition 1 Results by county Yes: 70–80%; 60–70%; 50–60%; No: 70–80%; 60–70%; 50–60%

Result	Votes	Percentage
Yes	6,751,018	56.22
No	5,258,157	43.78
