= 2018 California Proposition 2 =

Proposition 2, also known as Prop 2 or Use Millionaire's Tax Revenue for Homelessness Prevention Housing Bonds Measure, was a California ballot proposition which was intended to allow the state to use revenue from Proposition 63 (2004), which was a 1% on incomes over $1,000,000 for mental health resources passed in 2004, towards $2,000,000,000 in revenue bonds for housing solutions and homelessness prevention methods for people who required mental health resources.

It passed in the November 2018 California elections. The main campaign in support of Prop 2 was led by Affordable Housing Now, also known as Yes on Prop 2. Supporters of the proposition included Habitat for Humanity California, the Steinberg Institute, Mental Health America of California, the California Labor Federation, Lt. Gov. Gavin Newsom, U.S. Rep. Maxine Waters, the California Democratic Party and the California Republican Party. A major opponent of the proposition was the California Libertarian Party.

== Results ==
Proposition 2 Results by county Yes: 70–80%; 60–70%; 50–60%; No: 60–70%; 50–60%

Result	Votes	Percentage
Yes	7,662,528	63.43
No	4,417,327	36.57
