= 2018 California Proposition 72 =

2018 ballot measure about rainwater harvesting taxation in California

Proposition 72, also known as Prop 72, was a California ballot proposition and proposed state constitution amendment intended to exclude rainwater capture systems completed on or after January 1, 2019 from property tax assessments. The measure passed in the June 2018 California primary elections. Supporters of the measure believed it would encourage more homeowners to install these systems and would help conserve water. There was no opposing argument ever submitted to the Secretary of State. Save California Water ran the campaign supporting Prop 72. The amendment was sponsored by Senator Steve Glazer in the California State Legislature. The California Democratic Party supported the amendment. Other supports of the amendment include League of California Cities, Save the Bay, Planning and Conservation League, Trout Unlimited, and Rural County Representatives of California.

Results

Proposition 72 Results by county Yes: 90–100%; 80–90%; 70–80%; 60–70%

Results	Votes	Percentage
Yes	4,979,651	84.23
No	932,263	15.77
