= 2018 California Proposition 3 =

Proposition 3, also known as Prop 3 or Water Infrastructure and Watershed Conservation Bond Initiative, was a California ballot proposition intended to approve $8.877 billion worth of general obligation bonds for habitat protection measures, water supply projects, groundwater related projects, fishery related projects and other water conserveration projects. It failed in the November 2018 California elections.

The major campaign in support of the proposition was led by Californians for Safe Drinking Water and a Clean and Reliable Water Supply. Supporters of the proposition included Senator Dianne Feinstein, Representative Jim Costa, Representative John Garamendi, the Agricultural Council of California, the National Audubon Society and the National Wildlife Federation. Opponents of the proposition included the Sierra Club, Anthony Rendon, the Southern California Watershed Alliance, Friends of the River, the League of Women Voters of California and Save the American River Association.

== Results ==
Proposition 3 Results by county No: 70–80%; 60–70%; 50–60%; Yes: 60–70%; 50–60%

| Result | Votes | Percentage |
|---|---|---|
| Yes | 5,879,836 | 49.35 |
| No | 6,034,991 | 50.65 |
