= 2018 California Proposition 71 =

Proposition 71
- June 5, 2018
- Sets Effective Date For Ballot Measures

Results
Choice	Votes	%
Yes	4,527,073	77.85%
No	1,288,385	22.15%
Total votes	5,815,458	100.00%
County results
For
80–90%
70–80%
60–70%

2018 California Proposition 71, also known as Prop 71, was a California ballot proposition and proposed state constitution amendment to change the effective date of passed ballot measures from the day after the election to the fifth day after the Secretary of State certified the results.

Stated goals of the measure was to ensure results were official before new measures were implemented. Opposers feared a delay in urgent measures. Kevin Mullin supported the amendment. The California Democratic Party endorsed the amendment. Rural County Representatives of California also endorsed the amendment.

It passed in the June 2018 California primary election.

== Results ==
Results	Votes	Percentage
Yes	4,527,073	77.85
No	1,288,385	22.15
