= 2018 California Proposition 68 =

Proposition 68
- Natural Resources Bond

Results
Choice	Votes	%
Yes	3,808,000	57.35%
No	2,831,899	42.65%
Valid votes	6,639,899	100.00%
Invalid or blank votes	0	0.00%
Total votes	6,639,899	100.00%
County results
For
70%–80%
60%–70%
50%–60%
Against
70%–80%
60%–70%
50%–60%

California Proposition 68 (also the Natural Resources Bond or the California Drought, Water, Parks, Climate, Coastal Protection, and Outdoor Access for All Act of 2018) was a legislatively referred constitutional amendment that appeared on ballots in California in the June primary election in 2018. It was a $4.1bn bond measure to fund parks, environmental projects, water infrastructure projects and flood protection measures throughout California.

== Proposal ==
The Proposition would allow the State of California to borrow $4.1bn using a municipal bond scheme in order to fund parks, water and flood protection infrastructure and various environmental projects. The Proposition set allocation of these funds between different strategies:

- Natural Resource Conservation and Resiliency - $1.547bn
  - State conservancies and wildlife conservation - $767m
  - Climate preparedness and habitat resiliency - $443m
  - Ocean and coastal protection - $175m
  - River and waterway improvements - $162m
- Parks and recreation - $1.283bn
  - Parks in neighbourhoods with few parks - $725m
  - Local and regional parks - $285m
  - State park restoration, preservation and protection - $218m
  - Trails, greenways, and rural recreation - $55m
- Water - $1.27bn
  - Flood protection - $550m
  - Groundwater recharge and cleanup - $370m
  - Safe drinking water - $250m
  - Water recycling - $100m

The cost to the public was estimated to be $7.8bn after paying off interest, or an average annual repayment of $200m for forty years.

== Campaign ==
=== Support ===
Proposition 68 was authored by State Senator Kevin de León. The 'Yes' campaign focused mainly on the improvements the Proposition would bring to parks, saying that it would remedy years of "under-investment" in environmental infrastructure in poorer communities. 'Yes' supporters spent more than $9m throughout the campaign.

==== Endorsements ====
- Jerry Brown, then-Governor of California
- Gavin Newsom, then-Lieutenant Governor of California
- Antonio Villaraigosa, former Los Angeles mayor
- League of California Cities, association of California's cities
- Los Angeles Times, the United States' fifth largest newspaper, based in Los Angeles
- The Sacramento Bee, Sacramento's largest newspaper
- Daily Bruin, University of California, Los Angeles newspaper
- The Mercury News, paper from San Jose, California
- The Outdoor Industry Association
- Save the Redwoods League
- Peninsula Open Space Trust

=== Opposition ===
Opposition to Proposition 68 mainly argued that instead of issuing debt, the state should fund parks and environmental projects through California's general fund. It was also noted that although the 'Yes' campaign was promoting the Proposition on its benefits to parks, less than one third of the money would actually go towards parks and recreation.

==== Endorsements ====
- John Moorlach, State Senator
- Andrea Seastrand, former House member
- Jon Coupal, President of the Howard Jarvis Taxpayers Association
- Peace and Freedom Party, left-wing political party
- Chico Enterprise-Record, newspaper of Chico, California

== Results ==
=== Yes/No Statement ===
A "yes" vote on Proposition 68 proposes: The state could sell $4.1 billion in general obligation bonds to fund various natural resources-related programs such as for habitat conservation, parks, and water-related projects. A "no" vote on Proposition 68 proposes: The state could not sell $4.1 billion in general obligation bonds to fund various natural resources-related programs.

=== Results ===
Proposition 68 gained 3,808,000 yes votes and 2,831,899 no votes (a total of 6,639,899 votes), so passing with 57.35% approval
