= 2018 California Proposition 11 =

Proposition 11
- Emergency Ambulance Employees Safety and Preparedness Act

Results
Choice	Votes	%
Yes	7,181,116	59.63%
No	4,861,831	40.37%
Valid votes	12,042,947	100.00%
Invalid or blank votes	0	0.00%
Total votes	12,042,947	100.00%
County results
Yes
60–70%
50–60%
No
60–70%
50–60%

California Proposition 11, also known as the Emergency Ambulance Employees Safety and Preparedness Act, was a ballot proposition that was voted on during the November 2018 California general election. The proposition aimed to address the issue of emergency medical technicians (EMTs) and paramedics being required to remain on-call during meal and rest breaks.

Under existing California labor laws, employers are required to provide meal and rest breaks to their employees. However, emergency medical services (EMS) providers argued that EMTs and paramedics should be exempt from this requirement due to the nature of their work, where they need to be available for immediate emergency response. Proposition 11 sought to establish an exception to existing labor laws for private-sector ambulance employees. It aimed to allow these employees to be reachable during their breaks and respond to emergency calls without violating labor laws. Critics of Proposition 11 argued that it undermined worker protections and labor rights. They contended that EMTs and paramedics deserved uninterrupted meal and rest breaks like other employees, and that appropriate staffing levels should be maintained to ensure uninterrupted emergency services. Proponents of Proposition 11, such as American Medical Response who was the main campaign contributor in support, claimed that uninterrupted meal and rest breaks for EMTs and paramedics would lead to delayed emergency responses, potentially endangering lives. They argued that flexible break policies were necessary to ensure public safety and that these employees could still take breaks as long as they remained available to respond to emergencies.

== Result ==
Proposition 8
Choice	Votes	%
No	4,861,831	40.37
Yes	7,181,116	59.63
Valid votes	12,042,847	100
Total votes	12,042,847	100.00
