= California Chamber of Commerce =

Chamber of commerce

- Founded: 1890
- Purpose: Business advocacy, HR compliance
- Location: Sacramento, California
- Region served: California
- Members: 13,000+
- Website: www.calchamber.com

The California Chamber of Commerce (CalChamber) is a broad-based business advocacy group in California, United States, originating as the California State Board of Trade in 1890. Its membership includes large and small firms from every industry, representing one-quarter of the private sector jobs in California. A non-profit organization, the Chamber helps businesses and human resources professionals comply with employment laws, promotes international trade, and lobbies politicians for pro-business policies and investment.

== History ==
The origins of CalChamber date back to the California State Board of Trade, which was incorporated on February 20, 1890, following three years of operation as a voluntary entity. During its early years, the organization primarily focused on promoting immigration to California, via the publication and dissemination of statistical and descriptive information about California's growth and its various products.

In 1910, the California State Board of Trade merged with two other entities: the Manufacturers and Producers Association of California and the California Promotion Committee. This new, unified organization was known as the California Development Board, and inherited and pursued the goals of its predecessor organizations, continuing to promote immigration to California and the state's products.

In 1921, the California Development Board merged with the California Industries Association, resulting in the formation of a new entity known as the California Development Association, Commerce, and Industry. In September 1929, this organization was incorporated as the California State Chamber of Commerce, Agriculture, and Industry.

In 1972, the organization was rebranded as the California Chamber of Commerce.

== Personnel ==
The CalChamber Board of Directors is elected by the membership. Jennifer Barrera has served as president and CEO of CalChamber since October 1, 2021.

== Advocacy ==
Among other positions, the Chamber advocates against increases in unemployment insurance costs and taxes.

Each year, the CalChamber releases a list of "job killer" bills to identify legislation that will, in the chamber's view, hurt economic and job growth in California. The CalChamber tracks the bills throughout the rest of the legislative session and lobbies legislators about the purported negative consequences these bills will have on the state.
