= California ballot proposition =

Statewide referendum item in California

In California, a ballot proposition is a referendum or an initiative measure that is submitted to the electorate for a direct decision or direct vote (or plebiscite). If passed, it can alter one or more of the articles of the Constitution of California, one or more of the 29 California Codes, or another law in the California Statutes by clarifying current or adding statute(s) or removing current statute(s).

Measures can be placed on the ballot either by the California State Legislature or via a petition signed by registered voters. The state legislature can place a state constitutional amendment or a proposed law change on the ballot as a referendum to be approved by voters. Under the state constitution, certain proposed changes to state laws may require mandatory referendums, and must be approved by voters before they can take effect. A measure placed on the ballot via petition can either be a vote to veto a law that has been adopted by the legislature (an optional referendum or "people's veto") or a new proposed law (initiative), or a new proposed constitutional amendment.

== Overview ==
Although not originally part of the Constitution of California, the state has three direct democracy mechanisms for statewide elections: initiatives (which include either constitutional amendments or statutes), referendums, and recalls. Constitutional amendments can be placed on the ballot by the Legislature or by voter initiative, and any California voter has the ability to place an initiative, referendum, or recall on the ballot.

Discussions around incorporating the concept of direct democracy into California's Constitution were initially floated in 1849 when the first California Constitutional Convention met. However, the initiative amendment, initiative statute, recall, and optional (or facultative) referendum were not introduced until 1911 with the constitutional amendment Proposition 7, reflecting Progressive Era reforms that in part argued more democracy would cure the "ills" of democracy. Governor Hiram Johnson supported the creation of this process to balance the power and that corporations, specifically Southern Pacific Railroad, had over state legislators and judges, as well as responding to the general public's disaffection with corruption. In his inaugural address, Johnson spoke of his reform platform which included the goal to add the tools of direct democracy to the Constitution of California, especially mentioning the initiative, the referendum, and the recall. Proposition 7 was approved by voters in a special election on October 10, 1911.

Direct democracy should encourage voters to participate in elections in theory and this appears to the be the case with midterm elections and off-year elections more than presidential elections. Voter turnout has had an impact on the timing of ballot measures since a simple majority is required for them to pass no matter what the voter turnout. In fact, the required number of signatures required for a ballot measure to pass is reduced with lower voter turnout, therefore proponents of a ballot measure could strategically aim for a low turnout election. To counter this approach and its outcomes, the California legislature proposed California Senate Bill 202 (S.B. 202), which passed in 2011, mandated that any initiative approved after July 1, 2011 can appear only on the November general election ballot. The statute that was controversial at the time, perceived as a self-serving, single-party initiative, but sponsors of the bill argued it would prevent special interests groups from taking advantage of low-turnout elections. The November general election rule for initiatives and optional referendums remains in effect, but it created a new issue: the general election ballots are often lengthy, possibly discouraging voter engagement resulting in increased voter abstention.

With Democrats having a super-majority in both houses of the legislature since the 2019-2020 legislative session, corporations have been found to use the direct democracy process to challenge the power that unions and other progressive activists currently yield in the legislature. For example, after the legislature passed Assembly Bill 5 in 2019 to reclassify many gig economy workers from independent contractors to employees, companies such as Uber and Lyft funded Proposition 22 to exempt rideshare and delivery companies from the bill's requirements. In November 2020, California voters approved Proposition 22 with 59% of the vote in favor.

=== Initiatives ===
The minimum number of signatures for an initiative petition is at least 8 percent (for an amendment to the state constitution) or 5 percent (for a statute) of the number of people who voted in the most recent election for governor, as per Cal. Const., art. II, § 8(b); Elections Code § 9035. Based on the 2022 gubernatorial (governor) election, which saw a turnout of 10,933,018, initiative statutes require 546,651 signatures whereas initiative proposed constitutional amendments require 874,641. Previously, based on the 12,464,235 turnout for the 2018 gubernatorial election, the minimum number of required signatures needed to be collected was 623,212 for a proposed statute, and 997,139 for a proposed constitutional amendment up until 2022.

The filing fee for submitting an initiative to the ballot was increased from $200 to $2,000 following the signing of a law in September 2015. This fee is refunded if the proposition makes it to the ballot. The $200 fee had been originally set in 1943, and the State Legislature felt that it needed to be increased to discourage people from proposing frivolous or improper measures for the ballot.

Before initiative proponents may gather signatures, the Attorney General prepares an official title and summary for the proposed law, and the California Legislative Analyst's Office submits a report on its estimated fiscal effects. There is a 30-day public review period that begins after the Attorney General receives the submission and the filing fee, where any member of the public may submit public comments on the proposed initiative. The Attorney General then prepares the official title and summary after the public review period. The Legislative Analyst's Office has 50 days after receiving the final version of the proposed measure to prepare its report, and the Attorney General has 15 days after receiving these fiscal estimates to send the final official version of the title and summary to both the Secretary of State and the initiative proponents.

After gaining approval, proponents have 180 days to gather the required number of signatures (the Secretary of State sets the official deadline within one day after receiving the title and summary from the Attorney General). Proponents usually seek at least 50 percent more than the legal minimum number of signatures to compensate for possible duplicate or otherwise invalid signatures.

Proponents who have gathered at least 25 percent of the required number of signatures must immediately submit a written statement to the Secretary of State certifying they have done so. This is to allow time for each chamber in the State Legislature to assign the proposed initiative to its appropriate committees and schedule public hearings on it. However, the Legislature cannot amend the proposed initiative or prevent it from being added to the ballot once it qualifies.

After all the signed petitions have been collected, proponents need to turn them in to each appropriate county elections official (i.e., all the signatures from those in Alameda County need to be submitted to the Alameda County elections official, Los Angeles County signatures need to be turned in to the LA County elections official, and so on). Each county then has eight working days after receiving the signed petitions to report the raw count of signatures to the Secretary of State, who then determines if the counties can proceed with verifying the signatures or if the initiative proponents failed to get the required number of signatures.

In verifying the signatures, the counties first take a random sample of 3 percent or 500 of the signatures, whichever is greater, and have 30 working days to report their findings to the Secretary of State. If a county received less than 500, it is to verify all of them. If the statewide random sample total projects more than 110 percent of the required number of signatures, the initiative automatically qualifies; if less than 95 percent, it fails; and if it is between 95 and 110 percent, the Secretary of State then orders a check of all the signatures. If required, the counties then have another 30 working days to do a full check.

The cut-off time to go through this entire process, have all the signatures verified and get on a particular ballot is 131 days before that election. An initiative that qualifies by this deadline is first classified by the Secretary of State as "eligible" for the upcoming statewide ballot; those that qualify after this deadline are "eligible" for the following statewide ballot. Proponents still have the option to withdraw an initiative that is "eligible" for the ballot. The Secretary of State only uses the "qualified" classification in this particular case to mean when the initiative is on the official list that will appear on the ballot, which is prepared and certified on that 131-day mark.

Ballots that record neither a "yes" nor a "no" on the proposition are ignored, and of the remaining votes, "yes" votes must exceed "no" votes for the proposition to pass. In other words, the majority of voters required for passage refers to a majority of those voting on that proposition, rather than a majority of those voting in the election held at the same time, or a majority of those who are registered to vote. If the proposition passes, it becomes a part of the state constitution (if it is a proposed amendment) or the state's statutes (if it is a proposed statute), in the latter case having the same legal effect as if it had been passed by the state legislature and signed by the governor.

=== Mandatory referendum ===
Under California law, certain types of bills passed by the State Legislature and signed by the Governor must be submitted to the voters as a referendum at the next statewide election. Legislative bills that require mandatory referendums include state constitutional amendments, bond measures, and amendments to previously approved voter initiatives. More than 50 percent of the voters must then support these amendments or new laws on the ballot for them to go into effect.

=== Optional referendum ===
Laws already adopted by the state legislature may be vetoed by means of a referendum. This is also known as a "petition referendum" or "people's veto". The process is similar to an initiative as noted above, except that it is an already passed law submitted as a petition to the Attorney General. The proponent, however, only has 90 days after the law in question is enacted to submit the request to the Attorney General for a circulating title and summary, gather the signatures, and file the petitions with the county elections officials; otherwise, it must go through the initiative process, submitted as a proposed amendment.

Laws that are ineligible for optional referendums include urgency statutes, statutes calling elections, and statutes providing for tax levies or appropriations for usual, current state expenses.

To qualify on the ballot, a referendum petition must be signed by at least five percent of the number of voters in the previous gubernatorial election. The signature checking process by the counties is basically the same as the initiative process. The counties take a random sample of 3 percent or 500 of the signatures, whichever is greater. If the statewide random sample total projects more than 110 percent of the required number of signatures, the referendum automatically qualifies; if less than 95 percent, it fails; and if it is between 95 and 110 percent, a full check of all the signatures is performed.

Unlike initiatives which must qualify 131 days before the election to appear on the ballot, a referendum can qualify up to 31 days before. If the referendum receives more "no" votes than "yes" votes, the law is repealed.

As of 2020, only 94 optional referendums proposed since 1912 had received a circulating title and summary, and of those only 52 qualified for the ballot.

=== Recall ===
The recall is the power of the electorate to remove an elected official from office before their term expires. Since 1913, California voters have been presented with 182 recall attempts for a range of elected officials, including high-ranking officials like governor and senator, as well as other types of officials including lieutenant governor, assembly member, secretary of state, state treasurer, state controller, insurance commissioner, and board of equalization member Over the years (as of October 2026), among those offices, there have been 57 recall attempts on governors and 50 for members of the state assembly. On only one occasion has the Governor of California been successfully recalled: in 2003, Democratic governor Gray Davis was recalled from office and his elected successor was Republican governor Arnold Schwarzenegger. In 2021, voters rejected a recall vote for Democratic governor Gavin Newsom.

== Proposition numbering ==
Prior to the general election of 1914, ballot measures were not numbered. Starting with the general election of 1914, ballot propositions were given a number starting at one for each election and this continued until November 1982. This tended to be confusing as often famous initiatives such as Proposition 13 in 1978 might be confused with another initiative in a later year if there were more than twelve proposals on the ballot in any given year.

From November 1982 until November 1998, the proposition numbers were not re-used but continued to increment every election, eventually resulting in proposition numbers exceeding 200 by the 1996 election.

Since the November 1998 general election, proposition numbering starts afresh at one and increases over the range of then ten years, then the count resets to number one after ten years. The chronological sequencing of the proposition number also reflects when it qualified to be placed on the ballot as well as what type of proposition it is, as bonds are listed first, followed by constitutional amendments, initiative measures and finally referendums.

== Conflicting propositions ==
Under Article II, Section 10(b) of the California Constitution, "If provisions of 2 or more measures approved at the same election conflict, those of the measure receiving the highest affirmative vote shall prevail." However, those provisions that do not conflict with the winning proposition may still go into effect. To get around this loophole, many initiatives include so-called "poison pill" clauses, specifying which provisions are voided in the other propositions.

The rule in the constitution was clarified in 1990 by the California Supreme Court in its ruling in Taxpayers to Limit Campaign Spending v. Fair Political Practices Commission:

When two or more measures are competing initiatives, either because they are expressly offered as "all-or-nothing" alternatives or because each creates a comprehensive regulatory scheme related to the same subject, section 10(b) mandates that only the provisions of the measure receiving the highest number of affirmative votes be enforced.

The Court was concerned that attempts to combine the non-conflicting provisions in such competing initiatives would result in regulatory schemes completely different from what the electorate understood or intended.

== Criticisms ==
Criticism has been raised of the initiative process, suggesting that with trends toward lower voter turnouts, and evidence for voter disinterest in candidates and issues other than in presidential elections, that a "direct democracy system specifically designed to be inflexible" might be infeasible to continue as a way to make important California public policy decisions.

Issues have also been raised regarding the narrowing of democratic access imposed by the high cost of conducting initiatives and referendums, and by the challenges raised by attempting comprehensive governance in the face of individual, non-comprehensive (and sometimes at least partially contrary) initiatives. Generally, because of California's size and population, proponents of a ballot initiative or referendum need significant amounts of money and resources to first gather the required number of petition signatures, and then campaign across the state for the effort's passage. The wealthy and large special interest groups can afford to do so (or to sponsor the opposition campaigns), a process that can be cost-prohibitive to most other organizations and individual citizens.

With regard to the cumulative effect of stand-alone propositions passed by voters (see also the preceding section), complaint has been raised that they collectively limit the state legislature in dealing with issues comprehensively, e.g. in the overall shaping of public policy, or the overall management of the state budget. For example, legislators trying to pass a state budget must work around both Proposition 13's inflexible limits on taxes and Proposition 98's school-funding guarantee.

== See also ==
- List of California ballot propositions
- Elections in California
