= 2024 California Proposition 34 =

2024 California referendum

Proposition 34
- November 5, 2024
- Restricts Spending of Prescription Drug Revenues By Certain Health Care Providers

Results
Choice	Votes	%
Yes	7,378,686	50.89%
No	7,121,317	49.11%

Yes
90–100%
80–90%
70–80%
60–70%
50–60%
No
90–100%
80–90%
70–80%
60–70%
50–60%

Proposition 34, titled Restricts Spending of Prescription Drug Revenues By Certain Health Care Providers, was a California ballot proposition and initiative statute in the 2024 general election on November 5. The proposition requires health care providers that have spent over $100 million in any 10-year period on anything other than direct patient care, and operated multifamily housing with over 500 high-severity health and safety violations, to spend 98% of the revenues from federal discount prescription drug program on direct patient care.

Supporters argued that health care providers, especially those that receive government subsidies such as those through the federal 340B Drug Pricing Program, should spend most of their funds on direct patient care and not divert money to unrelated projects.

Opponents argued that the proposition is a "revenge initiative" designed to specifically target the AIDS Healthcare Foundation, the only group in California who seemed to match Proposition 34's restrictions. The AIDS Healthcare Foundation was the primary supporter and financial backer of the concurrent Proposition 33, as well as 2018 California Proposition 10 and 2020 California Proposition 21; all were similar rent control proposals designed to overturn the Costa–Hawkins Rental Housing Act, which all failed with almost identical margins (60–40), while the California Apartment Association, a major supporter of Proposition 34, was a major opponent of Proposition 33 and other similar rent control proposals.

== Polling ==
Poll source	Date(s) administered	Sample size (Note: Key: A – all adults RV – registered voters LV – likely voters V – unclear)	Margin of error	Yes	No	Undecided
Competitive Edge Research	October 28–30, 2024	517 (RV)	± 4.3%	43%	49%	9%
Public Policy Institute of California	October 7–15, 2024	1,137 (LV)	± 3.7%	47%	49%	4%
Public Policy Institute of California	August 29 – September 9, 2024	1,071 (LV)	± 3.7%	53%	43%	4%

== Results ==
Proposition 34
Choice	Votes	%
For	7,378,686	50.89
Against	7,121,317	49.11
Total	14,500,003	100.00

== See also ==
- 2024 United States ballot measures
- List of California ballot propositions
