= Betty McGuire =

American film, stage and television actress (1926–2026)

- McGuire in Columbo, 1975
- Born: March 20, 1926; Bridgeport, Connecticut, U.S.
- Died: October 8, 2026 (aged 100); Woodland Hills, California, U.S.
- Occupation: Actress
- Years active: 1955–2009

Betty McGuire (March 20, 1926 – October 8, 2026) was an American film, stage and television actress. She was best known for playing the recurring role of Maggie Seaver's mother Kate Malone in the American sitcom television series Growing Pains.

== Life and career ==
McGuire was born in Bridgeport, Connecticut, on March 20, 1926. She began her stage career in 1955, appearing in the stage play Plain and Fancy. During her stage career, she appeared in such stage plays as Oh, Captain!, Auntie Mame, and Gypsy. She then began her screen career in 1973, appearing in the CBS sitcom television series The Doris Day Show. In 1978, she played Sister Mary Quacker in the film Cheech & Chong's Up in Smoke.

Later in her career, McGuire guest-starred on television programs including Cannon, Hart to Hart, Charlie's Angels, Baretta, Columbo, Little House on the Prairie, Hill Street Blues, Matlock, St. Elsewhere, Star Trek: Deep Space Nine, ER and CSI: Miami. She played the recurring role of Maggie Seaver's mother Kate Malone in the ABC sitcom television series Growing Pains, and the recurring role of Mrs. Fraser in the CBS series Falcon Crest. She also appeared in films such as Switchblade Sisters, Coma, Chesty Anderson, USN and The Incredible Shrinking Woman.

She retired from acting in 2009, last appearing in the film Play the Game. Aside from acting, she volunteered as a receptionist at the Coalition for Economic Survival, a non-profit community organization in Los Angeles, California.

McGuire died from natural causes at the Motion Picture & Television Country House and Hospital in Woodland Hills, California, on October 8, 2026, at the age of 100.
