= Rent control in the United States =

Economic policy relating to housing markets

In the United States, rent control refers to laws or ordinances that set price controls on the rent of residential housing to function as a price ceiling. More loosely, "rent control" describes several types of price control:

- "strict price ceilings", also known as "rent freeze" systems, or "absolute" or "first generation" rent controls, in which no increases in rent are allowed at all (rent is typically frozen at the rate existing when the law was enacted);
- "vacancy control", also known as "strict" or "strong" rent control, in which the rental price can rise but continues to be regulated in between tenancies (a new tenant pays almost the same rent as the previous tenant); and
- "vacancy decontrol", also known as "tenancy" or "second-generation" rent control, which limits price increases during a tenancy but allows rents to rise to market rate between tenancies (new tenants pay market rate rent but increases are limited as long as they remain).

As of 2022, seven states (California, New York, New Jersey, Maryland, Maine, Oregon, and Minnesota) and the District of Columbia have localities in which some form of residential rent control is in effect (for normal structures, excluding mobile homes). Thirty-seven states either prohibit or preempt rent control, while seven states allow their cities to enact rent control but have no cities that have implemented it.

There is a consensus among economists that rent control reduces the quality and quantity of rental housing units.

== History ==
In the United States during World War I, rents were "controlled" through a combination of public pressure and the efforts of local anti-rent-profiteering committees. Between 1919 and 1924, a number of cities and states adopted rent- and eviction-control laws. Modern rent controls were first adopted in response to the Great Depression and WWII- era shortages. Because of these shortages and the overall national economic crisis, the federal government called for emergency price control on consumer goods and rent control in 1942. However, not all states decided to implement these rent control laws.

During World War II roughly 80% of rental housing was put under rent control starting in 1941. Despite economic predictions of a reduction in housing supply, such a reduction was not observed. Instead it was seen that landlords opted to sell their units at uncontrolled prices, sometimes to tenants, rather than renting at controlled prices, leading to an increase in housing cooperatives and apartment home ownership, and a decrease in rental units.

It was not until the 1970s, during the economic recession, that Richard Nixon temporarily implemented a national wage and price controls to combat inflation, but this did not last for long and began to phase out in 1973. Nonetheless, tenants particularly in Berkeley kept organizing and brought rent stabilization to the June 6, 1973 L972 ballot. They won and Berkeley became the first city in California to have rent control since World War II. Other cities around the country followed and some still remain in effect or have been reintroduced in certain cities with large tenant populations, such as New York City, San Francisco, Los Angeles, Washington, D.C., and Oakland, California. Many smaller communities also have rent control — notably the California cities of Santa Monica, Berkeley, and West Hollywood — along with many small towns in New Jersey. In the early 1990s, rent control in some cities, such as Boston and Cambridge, Massachusetts, was ended by state referendums. When rent control ended in Cambridge, the city realized a 20% increase in new development and an increase in property values, according to a study by the MIT Center for Real Estate.

History reveals that these regulations are constantly in flux and adapting to situations such as natural disasters, economic crises, and pandemics. These changes do not always look the same and vary within each state and city. For example, due to COVID-19, Oakland, California implemented a moratorium to prevent evictions from happening, which ended in February 2021. Whereas in Massachusetts the eviction moratorium ended on October 17, 2020, and there was a CDC moratorium that stopped physical removals in cases where tenants owed rent due to illness or job loss until December 31, 2020.

=== California ===
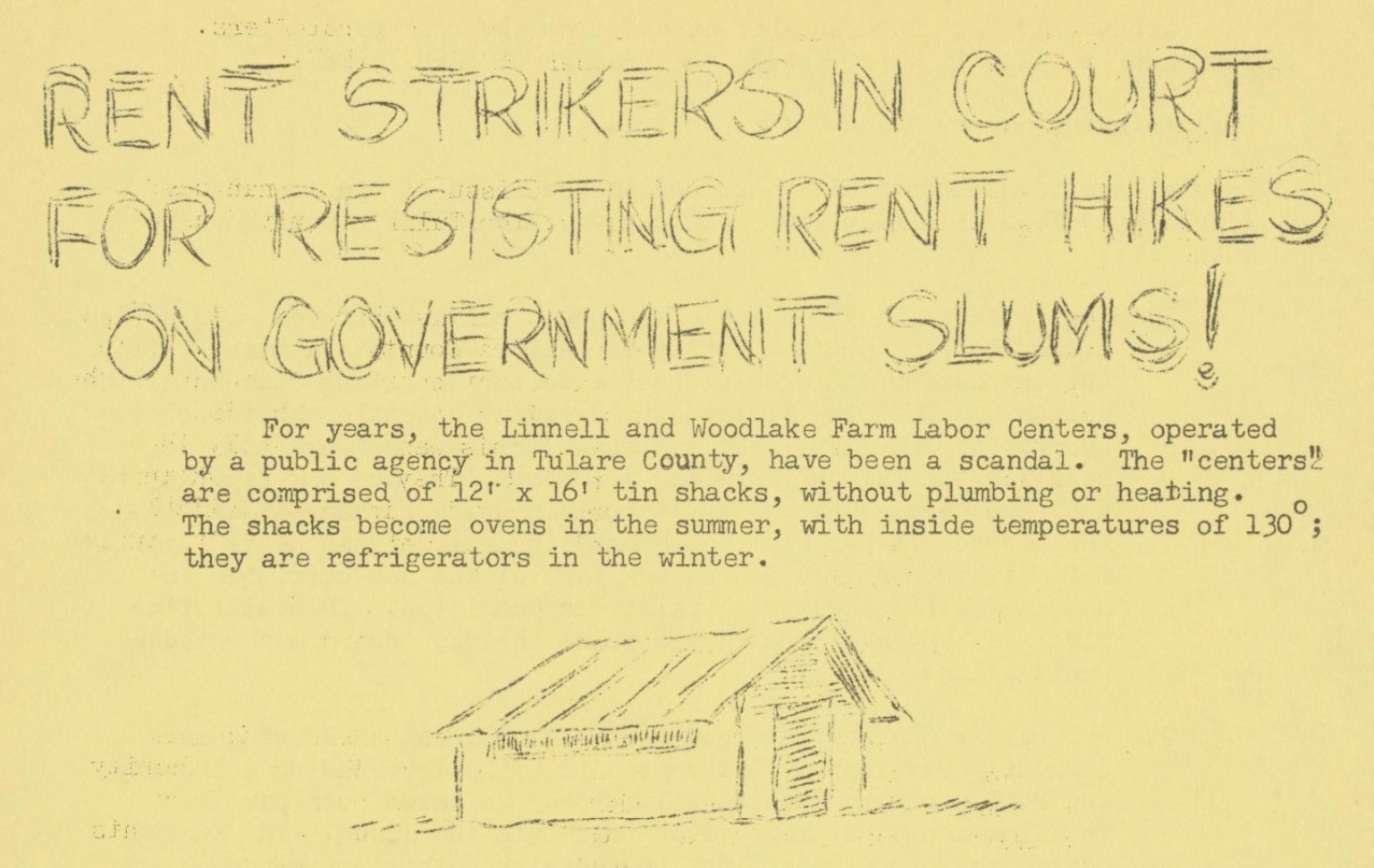
Excerpt from September 1965 Farm Labor Vol. 3, No. 4 Magazine Issue. Covering the 1965-68 Tulare County, California rent strike

In California, municipal enactment of rent controls followed the high inflation of the 1970s (causing rents to continually rise) and the 1979 statewide Proposition 13, which set property tax rates at 1%, and capped yearly increases at 2%. Leading the campaign to enact Proposition 13, California politician Howard Jarvis tried to get tenants to vote for Prop 13 by claiming that landlords would pass tax savings along to tenants; when most failed to do so, it became an additional motivating factor for rent control.

In 1985, California adopted the Ellis Act, eliminating municipalities' ability to prohibit the removal of properties from rental activities after the California Supreme Court in Nash v. City of Santa Monica ruled that municipalities could prevent landlords from "going out of business" and withdrawing their properties from the rental market.

"Strong" or "vacancy control" rent control laws were in effect in five California cities (West Hollywood, Santa Monica, Berkeley, East Palo Alto, and Cotati) in 1995, when AB 1164 (known as the Costa-Hawkins Rental Housing Act) preempted some elements of municipal rent control ordinances and eliminated strong rent-control in California (except in special cases like mobile home parks).

In 2018, a statewide initiative (Proposition 10) attempted to repeal the Costa-Hawkins law, which, if passed, would have allowed cities and municipalities to enact "strong" or "vacancy control" systems, allowed rent control to be applied to buildings built after 1995, and would have allowed rent control on single-family homes. All are currently prohibited by Costa-Hawkins. The proposition failed 59% to 41%.

In 2019, the California legislature passed and the governor signed AB 1482, which created a statewide rent cap for the next 10 years. The Tenant Protection Act of 2019 caps annual rent increases at 5% plus regional inflation. For example, had the bill been in effect in 2019, rent increases in Los Angeles would have been capped at 8.3%, and in San Francisco at 9%. The increases are pegged to the rental rate as of March 15, 2019. The new law does not apply to buildings built within the prior 15 years, or to single-family homes (unless owned by corporations or institutional investors). It also includes a requirement to show "just cause" for evictions, and retains "vacancy decontrol", meaning that rents can increase to market rate between tenants.

In 2020, Michael Weinstein, the founder of the AIDS Healthcare Foundation (AHF), sponsored and financed a second ballot initiative to allow more rent control, because he felt that AB 1482 (above) did not provide enough tenant protections, such as limiting rent increases between tenants. 2020 California Proposition 21, like its predecessor 2018 California Proposition 10, was funded almost exclusively by Weinstein's AIDS Healthcare Foundation, and failed by an almost identical margin. AHF is also a supporter of the 'Justice for Renters Act,' a 2024 ballot initiative that would expand local control over rent laws.

=== Maryland ===
A rent control law was adopted in Montgomery County, Maryland in 2023. Though it did not apply to new construction for 23 years, new-housing investment plummeted in the county in the years that followed. Permits for multi-family construction fell by 97%, which a county planning department employee called "a real suppression of housing production in the county." Permits in other counties in Maryland stayed level during this time.

=== Massachusetts ===
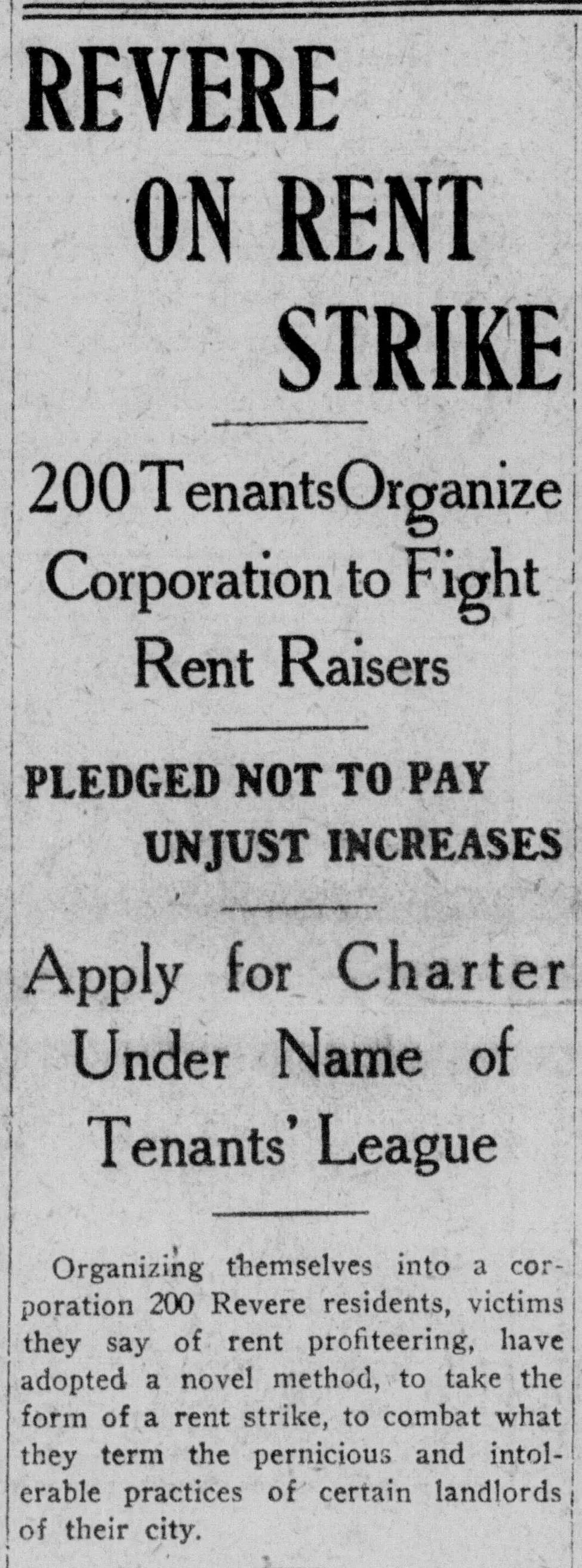
Boston Post, 3/19/1920 Revere, Mass rent strike.

In 1920, the state legislature passed several laws that prohibited landlords from raising rents past 25% a year, expiring in 1923. This was in the face of the 1918-20 New York City rent strikes, where a similar law (known as the April laws) was passed in its aftermath which was then amended in NY to be a far stricter and comprehensive law.

Rent control existed in Massachusetts between 1970 and 1994 when it was repealed by ballot initiative. According to the National Bureau of Economic Research, the number of rental units was reduced by 15%, tenants paid 40% below market rates on their units, and the value of properties was diminished by 45%. Tenants were 8-9% less likely to move due to rent control.

During its existence, those who lived in rent controlled apartments included Ruth Abrams, a Justice of the Massachusetts Supreme Judicial Court, and Frederik, Crown Prince of Denmark. It was blamed for the death of at least one landlord, due to the stress caused by a ruling from a rent control board that would require him to raise his entire house to create a new, legal apartment in the basement.

Rents rose dramatically after rent control was repealed, with average rents rising 21 percent across all units in municipalities that had a rent control program before repeal; median rents rose 40 percent in Cambridge for tenants who stayed in formerly controlled units or moved to other never-controlled units. Additionally, "exit rates from formerly controlled units spiked... and given the substantial accompanying increases in rents, it is likely that the new cohorts of renters were significantly more affluent than the tenants they replaced."

After the repeal, the Massachusetts General Court passed a law protecting low-income tenants in rent control apartments from being evicted. Only 9.4% of tenants in rent-controlled apartments in Cambridge applied for and received protection for up to two years. One review states that one possible explanation for the low number is the combination of a strict income limit with inaction by tenants whose rents did not immediately rise in the aftermath of repeal. However, "the dramatically low percentage of formerly controlled units whose tenants established protected status gives credence to the assertion of opponents of rent control that it had become an entitlement program for middle- and upper-income tenants."

=== Minnesota ===
In November 2021, voters in Saint Paul, Minnesota, passed a rent control ballot initiative that capped annual rent increases at 3 percent, included vacancy control, and did not exempt new construction or allow inflation to be added to the allowable rate increase. This resulted in an 80% reduction in requests for new housing permits, while in neighboring Minneapolis, where the city council didn't take any action; after the voters authorized the city council to craft a rent control ordinance which might exempt new construction; permits were up 70% in the following months. Saint Paul's rent control initiative has been significantly rolled back since then. In September 2022, the Saint Paul City Council voted to amend the law, allowing higher vacancy increases and exempting units built in the preceding or following 20 years from the increase cap. Since then, St. Paul's typical rents have grown at a pace similar to that of non-rent controlled Minneapolis in recent years according to Zillow estimates, since the ordinance gives landlords several options to raise rents more than the 3% annual cap.

=== New York ===
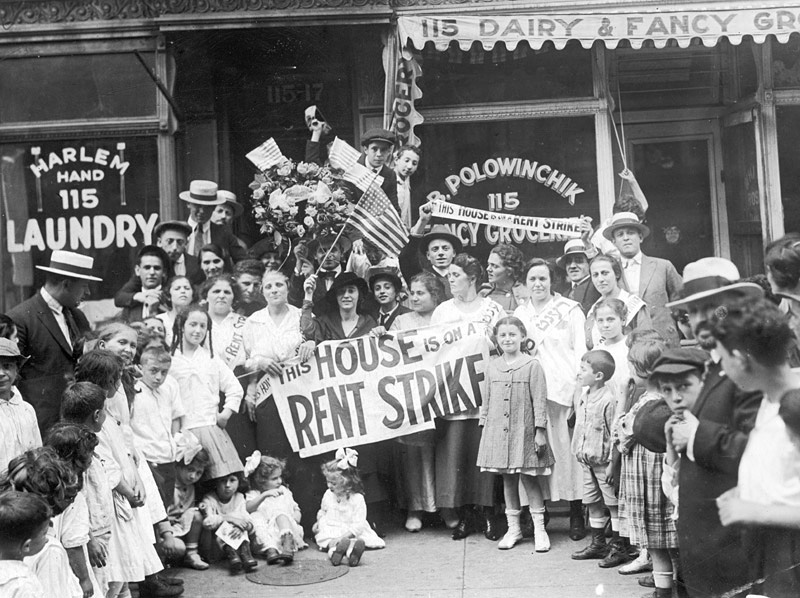
Tenants standing outside a building in Harlem where all tenants went on strike in September 1919.

New York State has had the longest history of rent controls, since 1920. New York City contains the majority of units covered by rent control. Rent control laws have stayed on the books for decades in New York because of an inadequate supply of "decent, affordable housing".

The worsening in the rental market led to the enactment of the Rent Stabilization Law of 1969, which aimed to help increase the number of available rental units. The current system is very complicated, and most of the protected renters are elderly.

William A. Moses, the founder of the Community Housing Improvement Program, a trade association that represents the owners of over 4,000 apartment buildings in New York City, said in 1983 that rent control was "the principal reason for neighborhood deterioration" and that at least 300,000 apartment units would have been built in New York City without it. Moses argued that landlords might not maintain their property if they were not allowed to collect adequate rent. Urban planning scholar Peter Marcuse said in 1983 that rent control was not the reason for some landlords abandoning their NYC properties at the low end of the market – instead, such abandonment stemmed from the inability of low-income renters to pay the maximum rent allowed by law. New York expanded rent control to encompass other municipalities in 2019 through the passage of the Housing Stability and Tenant Protection Act of 2019. Since then, opponents have argued these new rent control regulations hinder investment in multifamily properties in New York City. New York's rent control laws have also received criticism for inadvertently benefiting affluent tenants who might not otherwise need rental assistance. Additionally, a survey of property owners who own or manage rent stabilized units in New York City found that rent regulations would lead to fewer non-essential improvements and proactive maintenance at their buildings.

=== Oregon ===
In 2019, Oregon's legislature passed a bill which made the state the first in the nation to adopt a state-wide rent control policy. This new law limits annual rent increases to inflation plus 7 percent, includes vacancy decontrol (market rate between tenancies), exempts new construction for 15 years, and keeps the current state ban on local rent control policies (state level preemption) intact.

=== Cities ===
For localities with rent control, it often covers a large percentage of that city's stock of rental units. For example, in New York City as of 2017, 45% of rental units were "rent stabilized" and 1% were "rent controlled" (these are different legal classifications in NYC). In the District of Columbia as of 2019, about 36% of rental units were rent controlled. In San Francisco as of 2014, about 75% of all rental units were rent controlled, and in Los Angeles in 2014, 80% of multifamily units were rent controlled.

=== Mobile homes ===
In some regions, rent control laws are more commonly adopted for mobile home parks. Reasons given for these laws include residents owning their homes while renting the land the home sits on, the high cost of moving mobile homes, and the loss of home value when they are moved. California, for example, has only 13 local apartment rent control laws but over 100 local mobile home rent control laws. No new mobile home parks have been built in California since 1991.

== Law ==
Rent control laws define which rental units are affected, and may only cover larger complexes, or units older than a certain date. To attempt to not disincentivise investment in new housing stock, rent control laws often exempt new construction. For example, San Francisco's Rent Stabilization Ordinance exempts all units built after 1979. New York State generally exempts units built after 1974 anywhere in the state (although owners can agree to rent stabilization in exchange for tax benefits).

The frequency and degree of rent increases are limited, usually to the rate of inflation defined by the United States Consumer Price Index or to a fraction thereof. San Francisco, for example, allows annual rent increases of 60% of the CPI, up to a maximum 7%.

Rent control laws are often administered by nonelected rent control boards. Officers in city government assign members of the board, which will ensure mixed numbers of tenants and property owners to balance out their benefits. As stated in Goodman's research, a typical rent control board in New York is structured by two tenants, two landlords, and one homeowner. (Gilderbloom & Markham, 1996).

=== Federal law ===
Rent regulation in the United States is an issue for each state. In 1921, the Supreme Court of the United States case of Block v. Hirsh held by a majority that regulation of rents in the District of Columbia as a temporary emergency measure was constitutional, but shortly afterwards in 1924 in Chastleton Corp v. Sinclair the same law was unanimously struck down by the Supreme Court. After the 1930s New Deal, the Supreme Court ceased to interfere with social and economic legislation, and a growing number of states adopted rules. In the 1986 case of Fisher v. City of Berkeley, the US Supreme court held that there was no incompatibility between rent control and the Sherman Act.

=== State and local law ===
Oregon and California are the only states with statewide rent control laws, both enacted in 2019. Six states—California, New York, New Jersey, Maine, Maryland, and Minnesota—have localities in which some form of residential rent control is in effect. The District of Columbia also has rent control for some rental units; publicly owned or assisted properties, properties built in 1978 or later, and properties held by an owner with fewer than five rental units are exempt from D.C.'s rent-control law.

Thirty-seven states either prohibit or preempt rent control, while eight states allow their cities to enact rent control, but have no cities that have implemented it.

As of 2019, about 182 U.S. municipalities had rent control: 99 in New Jersey, 63 in New York, 18 in California, one in Maryland, and Washington, D.C. The five most populous cities with rent control are New York City; Los Angeles; San Francisco; Oakland; and Washington, D.C. The sole Maryland municipality with rent control is Takoma Park. On July 23, 2024, Montgomery County, Maryland adopted a rent stabilization law to limit rent increases to the level of inflation.

In 2012, only 2% of economists surveyed believed rent control had a positive impact on New York City and San Francisco; 81 percent disagreed.

== Impact ==
There is a consensus among economists that rent control reduces the quality and quantity of housing. A 2009 review of the economic literature by Blair Jenkins found that "the economics profession has reached a rare consensus: Rent control creates many more problems than it solves". A poll of prominent economists, conducted in 2012, found only 2% who said that rent control had "a positive impact" on the "amount and quality of broadly affordable rental housing in cities that have used them."

In a 2013 analysis of the body of economic research on rent control by Peter Tatian at the Urban Institute (a think tank described both as "liberal" and "independent"), he stated that "The conclusion seems to be that rent stabilization doesn't do a good job of protecting its intended beneficiaries—poor or vulnerable renters—because the targeting of the benefits is very haphazard.", and concluded that: "Given the current research, there seems to be little one can say in favor of rent control."

Two economists from opposing sides of the political spectrum, Nobel Laureate Paul Krugman (who identifies as an American liberal or European social democrat), and Thomas Sowell, (who stated that "libertarian" might best describe his views) have both criticized rent regulation as poor economics, which, despite its good intentions, leads to the creation of less housing, raises prices, and increases urban blight. Writing in 1946, economists Milton Friedman and George J. Stigler said: "Rent ceilings, therefore, cause haphazard and arbitrary allocation of space, inefficient use of space, retardation of new construction and indefinite continuance of rent ceilings, or subsidization of new construction and a future depression in residential building."

Historically, there have been two types of rent control – vacancy control (where the rent level of a unit is controlled irrespective of whether the tenant remains in the unit or not) and vacancy decontrol (where the rent level is controlled only while the existing tenant remains in the unit). In California prior to 1997, both types were allowed (the Costa/Hawkins bill of that year phased out vacancy control provisions). A 1990 study of Santa Monica, CA showed that vacancy control in that city protected existing tenants (lower increases in rent and longer stability). However, the policy potentially discouraged investors from building new rental units.

A 2000 study that compared the border areas of four California cities having vacancy control provisions (Santa Monica, Berkeley, West Hollywood, East Palo Alto) with the border areas of adjoining jurisdictions (two of which allowed vacancy decontrol, including Los Angeles, and two of which had no rent control) showed that existing tenants in the vacancy control cities had lower rents and longer tenure than in the comparison areas. Thus, the ordinances helped protect the existing tenants and, therefore, increased community stability. However, there were fewer new rental units created in the border areas of the vacancy controlled cities over the 10-year period.

A study that compared the effects of local rent control measures (both vacancy control and vacancy decontrol) with other local growth management measures in 490 California cities and counties (including all the largest ones) showed that rent control was stronger than individual land use restrictions (but not the aggregate effect of all growth restrictions) in reducing the number of rental units constructed between 1980 and 1990. The measures (both rent control and growth management) helped displace new construction from the metropolitan areas to the interiors of the state with low income and minority populations being particularly impacted.

In 1994, San Francisco voters passed a ballot initiative which expanded the city's existing rent control laws to include small multi-unit apartments with four or less units, built prior to 1980 (about 30% of the city's rental housing stock at the time). In 2017, Stanford economics researcher Rebecca Diamond and others published a study which examined the effects of this specific rent control law on the rental units newly controlled compared to similar style units (multi-unit apartments with four or less units) not under rent control (built after 1980), as well as this law's effect on the total city rental stock, and on overall rent prices in the city, covering the years from 1995 to 2012. They found that while San Francisco's rent control laws benefited tenants who had rent controlled units, it also resulted in landlords removing 30% of the units in the study from the rental market, (by conversion to condos or TICs) which led to a 15% citywide decrease in total rental units, and a 7% increase in citywide rents. The authors stated that "This substitution toward owner occupied and high-end new construction rental housing likely fueled the gentrification of San Francisco, as these types of properties cater to higher income individuals." The authors also noted that "...forcing landlords to provide insurance against rent increases leads to large losses to tenants. If society desires to provide social insurance against rent increases, it would be more desirable to offer this subsidy in the form of a government subsidy or tax credit. This would remove landlords' incentives to decrease the housing supply and could provide households with the insurance they desire."

The rental-accommodation market suffers from information asymmetries and high transaction costs. Typically, a landlord has more information about a home than a prospective tenant can reasonably detect. Moreover, once the tenant has moved in, the costs of moving again are very high. Unscrupulous landlords could conceal defects and, if the tenant complains, threaten to raise the rent at the end of the lease. With rent control, tenants can request that hidden defects, if they exist, be repaired to comply with building code requirements, without fearing retaliatory rent increases. Rent control could thus compensate somewhat for inefficiencies of the housing market. In older buildings, rent control may broaden incentives to renovate individual units: tenants may invest sweat equity and their own money to improve their homes if they are protected from landlords trying to capture the added value, while vacancy decontrol preserves landlords' financial incentive to renovate vacant units because it allows them to re-rent at market value.

According to a 2018 review of new research by Rebecca Diamond, new research showed that rent control benefitted tenants in the short-run, but had adverse effects for tenants and neighborhood stability in the long-run by reducing affordability, increasing gentrification, and creating negative spillovers for nearby neighborhoods. Landlords frequently responded to rent control policies by reconverting rentals into buildings exempt from rent control or by allowing rentals to decay.

A 2019 NBER working paper, which evaluated the efficacy of different housing affordability government policies, found that better targeting of rent control (towards the neediest households) could be welfare improving. A 2021 study modelled rent control policies and found that they may raise housing prices and reduce housing quantities, but that "well-designed rent control may help policymakers to stabilize housing market dynamics, even without creating housing market distortions".

== Commentary ==
In 2000, New York Times columnist and Princeton University economist Paul Krugman published a frequently cited column on rent control. He wrote, "The analysis of rent control is among the best-understood issues in all of economics, and – among economists anyway – one of the least controversial. In 1992, a poll of the American Economic Association found 93 percent of its members agreeing that 'a ceiling on rents reduces the quality and quantity of housing."

In light of recent legislative activity and ballot initiatives, several editorial boards have weighed in on rent control. In March 2019, the Chicago Tribune noted, "The cost of rent control would be borne throughout the city in ways that, over time, would leave Chicago worse off. Even for many renters." In September 2019, the Washington Post argued, "Rent-controlled laws can be good for some privileged beneficiaries, who are often not the people who really need help. But they are bad for many others." In September 2019, the Wall Street Journal wrote, "Economists of all stripes agree rent control doesn't work. A mere 2% think it has positive effects, according to a 2012 survey by the IGM Forum."

Tenants' rights activists argue that rent control is necessary in times of long term housing shortages (See California housing shortage) to reduce the human suffering caused by increasing rents and the homelessness which results when people who can no longer afford the rent increases get evicted. Milton Friedman argued that rent control restricts the property rights of property owners, as it limits what they may do with their property, requiring petitioning and other processes by law, prior to taking action against a renter.

== See also ==
- Affordable housing
- Price ceiling
- Subsidized housing
- Rent control in New York
- Rent control in California
- Rent regulation

People

- Don A. Allen, member of the California State Assembly and of the Los Angeles City Council in the 1940s and 1950s, urged lifting of wartime rent controls in Los Angeles
