= 2017 Ohio Issue 2 =

Issue 2
- November 7, 2017
- Ohio Drug Price Relief Act

Results
Choice	Votes	%
Yes	483,983	20.85%
No	1,837,608	79.15%
Total votes	2,321,591	100.00%

No
90–100%
80–90%
70–80%
60–70%
50–60%
Yes
90–100%
70–80%
60–70%
50–60%
Other
Tie
No votes

The Ohio Drug Price Relief Act was a ballot initiative in Ohio that would have made the state pay no higher of a price for prescription drugs than the lowest price that the United States Department of Veterans Affairs pays for them. It was voted on November 7, 2017, as Issue 2 on the ballot. The act was originally going to be voted on in November 2016, but the measure did not receive enough signatures. It was mostly funded by the AIDS Healthcare Foundation, the same organization that backed California Proposition 61. Supporters of the act said that it would lower drug prices and help save the state money, while opposers said that it was unworkable.

The initiative did not pass, failing by an almost 4 to 1 margin.

== Results ==
Issue 2
Choice	Votes	%
For	483,983	20.85
Against	1,837,608	79.15
Total	2,321,591	100.00
