= 2024 California Proposition 33 =

2024 California referendum

Proposition 33
- November 5, 2024
- Expands Local Governments' Authority to Enact Rent Control on Residential Property

Results
Choice	Votes	%
Yes	5,979,880	39.98%
No	8,975,542	60.02%

No
90–100%
80–90%
70–80%
60–70%
50–60%
Yes
90–100%
80–90%
70–80%
60–70%
50–60%

Proposition 33, titled Expands Local Governments' Authority to Enact Rent Control on Residential Property, and also marketed as the "Justice for Renters Act", was a California ballot proposition and initiative statute in the 2024 general election that would have repealed the Costa–Hawkins Rental Housing Act and allowed localities to enact rent control on single-family homes, apartments built after 1995, and to control rent increases between tenancies (vacancy control), all currently banned by Costa-Hawkins. It would also have prohibited the state from limiting local rent control.

Proposition 33 was sponsored and primarily funded by AIDS Healthcare Foundation, which contributed $47 million of the total $50 million in support funding. It was opposed by the California Apartment Association and the California Association of Realtors, which contributed $100 million of the $125 million in opposition funding. It failed to pass by a margin almost identical to the previous two rent control initiatives sponsored by AIDS Healthcare Foundation: 2018 California Proposition 10 and 2020 California Proposition 21.

== Campaign ==
=== Support ===
The official support statement of the proposition argued, "The rent is too damn high. One million people have left California. Rent control in America has worked to keep people in their homes since 1919. California's 17 million renters need relief. Homeowners and taxpayers benefit from stable communities. The California dream is dying. You can help save it."

=== Opposition ===
The official oppositional statement of the proposition argued, "Don't be fooled by the latest corporate landlord anti-housing scheme. California voters have rejected this radical proposal twice before, because it would freeze the construction of new housing and could effectively reverse dozens of new state housing laws. Vote No on 33 to protect new affordable housing and California homeowners."

== Endorsements ==
Yes

State officials

- Betty Yee, former California State Controller (2015–2023) (Democratic)

U.S. Senators

- Bernie Sanders, U.S. senator from Vermont (2007–present) (Independent)

State legislators

- Tina McKinnor, state assemblywoman from the 61st district (2022–present) (Democratic)

Local officials

- Los Angeles City Council
- Los Angeles County Board of Supervisors
- San Francisco Board of Supervisors

Political parties

- California Democratic Party
- Green Party of California
- Peace and Freedom Party

Organizations

- ACLU of Southern California
- AIDS Healthcare Foundation
- Americans for Democratic Action - Southern California
- California Nurses Association
- Coalition for Humane Immigrant Rights
- Housing is a Human Right
- Social Security Works - California
- Veterans' Voices
No

State officials

- Eleni Kounalakis, lieutenant governor of California (2019–present) (Democratic)

State legislators

- Toni Atkins, state senator from the 39th district (2016–2024) and former president pro tempore (2018–2024) (Democratic)
- Buffy Wicks, state assemblywoman from the 14th district (2018–present) (Democratic)

Local bodies

- Placer County Board of Supervisors

Political parties

- Libertarian Party of California
- Republican Party of California

Labor unions

- NorCal Carpenters Union
- United Brotherhood of Carpenters and Joiners of America

Organizations

- Apartment Association of Greater Los Angeles
- California Apartment Association
- California Business Roundtable
- California Chamber of Commerce
- California YIMBY
- Howard Jarvis Taxpayers Association

Newspapers

- Los Angeles Times

== Polling ==
Date of opinion poll	Conducted by	Sample size (Note: Key: A – all adults RV – registered voters LV – likely voters V – unclear)	Margin of error	In favor	Against	Undecided
October 27–30, 2024	Cygnal	611 (LV)	± 3.95%	33.4%	48.2%	18.4%
October 22–28, 2024	UC Berkeley IGS	4,341 (LV)	± 2.0%	35%	45%	20%
October 7–15, 2024	Public Policy Institute of California	1,137 (LV)	± 3.7%	42%	54%	4%
September 25 – October 1, 2024	UC Berkeley IGS	3,045 (LV)	± 2.5%	37%	36%	27%
September 12–25, 2024	CSU Long Beach, University of Southern California, Cal Poly Pomona	1,685 (LV)	± 2.4%	37.1%	33.3%	29.6%
August 29 – September 9, 2024	Public Policy Institute of California	1,071 (LV)	± 3.7%	51%	46%	3%
July 31 – August 11, 2024	UC Berkeley IGS	3,765 (LV)	± 2%	40%	34%	26%
January 21–29, 2024	University of Southern California/CSU Long Beach/Cal Poly Pomona	1,416 (LV)	± 2.6%	39%	41%	20%

== Results ==
Prohibit State Limitations on Local Rent Control Initiative
Choice	Votes	%
For	5,979,880	39.98
Against	8,975,542	60.02
Total	14,955,422	100.00
Source: Ballotpedia

== See also ==
- 2020 California Proposition 21 – Ballot measure on rent control
- 2024 California Proposition 34 – 2024 California referendum
- 2024 United States ballot measures
- List of California ballot propositions
