= Costa–Hawkins Rental Housing Act =

1995 California state law covering rent control

The Costa–Hawkins Rental Housing Act ("Costa–Hawkins") is a California state law enacted in 1995, placing limits on municipal rent control ordinances. Costa–Hawkins preempts the field in two major ways. First, it prohibits cities from establishing rent control over certain kinds of residential units, such as single-family dwellings, condominiums, and newly constructed apartment units (these are deemed exempt). Second, it prohibits "vacancy control", also called "strict" rent control. The legislation was sponsored by Democratic Senator Jim Costa and Republican assembly member Phil Hawkins.

If an apartment was under "vacancy control", the city rent control ordinance worked to deny or limit an owner's ability to increase its rent to new tenants, even in cases where the prior tenant voluntarily vacated the apartment or was evicted for a 'just cause' (such as failure to pay rent). Costa–Hawkins changed this by allowing an apartment owner the right to rent the vacancy at any price (i.e., usually the market price).

In 2019, the California legislature passed and the governor signed AB 1482, which created a statewide rent cap for the next 10 years. The Tenant Protection Act of 2019 caps annual rent increases at 5% plus regional inflation. For example, had the bill been in effect in 2019, rent increases in Los Angeles would have been capped at 8.3%, and in San Francisco at 9%. The increases are pegged to the rental rate as of March 15, 2019. The new law does not apply to buildings built within the prior 15 years, or to single-family homes (unless owned by corporations or institutional investors). It also includes a requirement to show "just cause" for evictions, and retains "vacancy decontrol", meaning that rents can increase to market rate between tenants. Many municipalities in California continue to have their own rent control laws, which remain intact under AB 1482. This ability of city governments is limited by the federal and state constitutions, as well as federal and state laws. Costa–Hawkins is one of the most prominent state statutes limiting the power of California cities to regulate their rental markets.

== Factors causing 1970s rent control ==
The late 1970s saw the second wave of rent control ordinances in California, and nationwide. Rising real estate values and surging interest rates made single family homes in California less affordable. Disappointed buyers often moved into apartments. A rental housing shortage appeared, rents went up. For chiefly non-housing reasons (e.g., land use), cities began restricting the building of new dwelling units. As prices rose for rental housing properties, return on investment and cash flow motivated new landlords with mortgages to raise rents. State and federal low-income housing assistance fell. Inflation was economy-wide, yet wages and salaries also fell. The consumer movement and Proposition 13 effects then stimulated tenant activism in municipal politics.

== The Costa–Hawkins legislation of 1995 ==
=== Political events leading to the Act ===
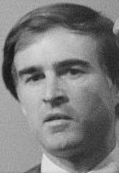
Jerry Brown, 1976.

In 1972 Berkeley became the first California city to adopt a second-wave rent control ordinance. In 1976 Governor Jerry Brown, a Democrat, vetoed state legislation (AB 3788) that would have preempted local rent control laws. It had been supported by a mainstream real estate group, the California Housing Council (CHC). In response to the veto, the real estate industry managed to get an initiative, Proposition 10, on the state ballot for 1980. It was soundly defeated, however, 65% to 35%.

In the meantime, in June 1978 Proposition 13 had been approved two to one by California voters. Before the election Howard Jarvis, the leader of the Prop. 13 'taxpayer revolt', as well as of the California Apartment Association, had suggested that landlords would lower rents if Prop. 13 passed. Many voters were said to have thought that Prop. 13, by lowering landlord property taxes, meant lower rents. The CHC, fearful of a tenant backlash if landlords failed to follow through, decided to oppose Prop. 13. Despite post-election efforts by Gov. Brown and the CHC, few landlords lowered their rents.

Across California urban tenants formed numerous local groups, which quickly grew in intensity and strength. Tenant activists organized political agitation directed at state and city government. Gov. Brown's new 'tenant hot line' was getting 12,000 calls a day. "In response to tenant pressure, rent strikes, and steady news coverage about rent increases and angry tenants, especially seniors, the Los Angeles City Council passed a six month rent freeze in August 1978." By 1988, fourteen cities had adopted full rent control, and sixty-four cities rent control for mobile home parks.

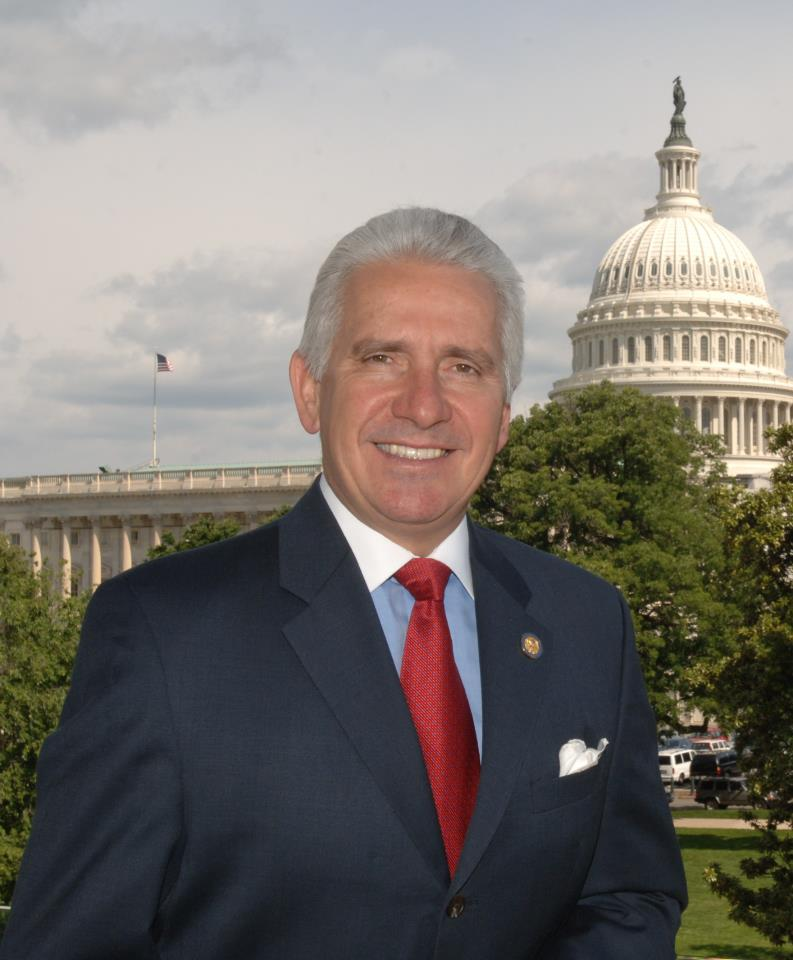
Jim Costa, circa 2013, a sponsor of the 1995 Act.

The strength of the tenants groups, however, eventually began to dissipate. Yet CHC attempts to partially 'preempt' rent control were thwarted by Democrats, led by State Senator David Roberti, until term limits forced his retirement in 1995. On the other hand, Democrat Jim Costa in the Assembly had unsuccessfully carried 'preemption' bills for the real estate industry since 1983. He was now in the Senate, where his 1995 bill passed the Judiciary Committee; absent Roberti, it drew Democratic votes. The bill then passed the Senate with one vote "more than the majority required."

=== The Act: sponsors, and opposition ===
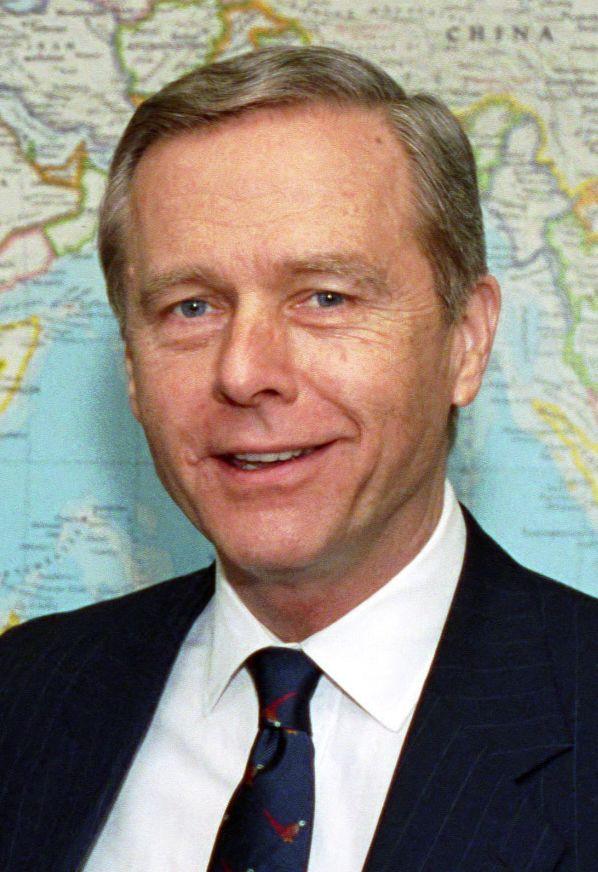
Pete Wilson, 1993.

The Costa–Hawkins Rental Housing Act became law in 1995. The statute became codified as Civil Code, §§ 1954.50 to 1954.535. The legislation's sponsors were Democratic Senator Jim Costa (Fresno) and Republican Assemblymember Phil Hawkins (Bellflower).

Introduced first in the Senate, the text of the legislation later became Assembly Bill 1164. After enduring several negotiated changes, it had passed in both chambers. The Republican Governor Pete Wilson then signed AB 1164 into law.

Although understood as limiting rent control, an agenda more favored by Republicans, some Democrats supported the Act. The pro-tenant Western Center on Law and Poverty (WCLP) had endorsed several features of the Bill that served tenant interests: the prohibition of rent increases "if serious health, safety, fire, or building code violations were discovered and not corrected for six months," and some claims by subtenants to lower rent under an existing tenancy.

The WCLP, however, was against the bill. Especially it sought to organize the opposition, to "piece together a coalition" of scattered local groups (tenants, senior citizens, religion affiliated), together with the California cities with rent control. Accordingly, Santa Monica, Berkeley, and West Hollywood contributed funds to hire a lobbyist. A concession (obtained by negotiation with proponents of the bill) was the 3-year phase-in of 'vacancy decontrol'. Yet the capitol consensus was that Costa–Hawkins was a "done deal" and the opposition a "last gasp". The passage of Costa Hawkins into law was seen as a rollback of some tenant advantages. Rent control advocates became uneasy at the challenge to their victories of the 1970s and 1980s.

=== The Act's provisions as codified ===
The Costa–Hawkins legislation is found in the California Civil Code, sections 1954.50 to 1954.535.

==== In general ====
The Act exempts from rent control: single family dwellings, condos, and new construction. It prohibits local government regulations re "vacancy control" in most situations. For the five cities with "vacancy control" in 1995 the Act is phased-in. It situates government contracts with owners about rent charged (e.g., provisions for low income housing), and the effects of a notice of violation, e.g., about health or safety. Costa–Hawkins also addresses subtenancies, and other issues.

==== Exemptions from rent control ====
The Act prohibits rent control on single family homes, on condominiums, and on newly built rental units. Generally, 'new' means any building constructed after February 1, 1995 (per the 1995 Costa-Hawkins Act). But for cities with existing rent control, 'new' is back-dated per the local rent control ordinance.

In those cities the enactment date of rent control determines what is 'new'. Only rental units constructed before then will remain subject to the city's rent control. Those built after will remain exempt under Costa-Hawkins. Hence, in San Francisco only construction older than 1979 can be rent controlled, and older than 1980 in Oakland and Berkeley, the years those cities passed their rent control laws. In the City of Los Angeles, the date is October, 1978.

These exemptions, however, may leave most of a city's total rental stock under rent control. For example, in San Francisco, as of 2014, about 75% of all rental units were rent controlled, and in Los Angeles in 2014, 80% of multifamily units were rent controlled.

==== 2002 Amendment to the Act ====
The Act was amended in 2002 to close a loophole related to condominium conversions after the 1995 Act. Owners of an apartment building may obtain a new certificate of occupancy due to a condo conversion even without then selling any converted units. In such case, the rental units do not become exempt from rent control under the Act.

2023 Amendment to the Act

The Act was amended in 2023 to protect permanently disabled tenants who need to move to a ground floor or otherwise accessible unit to accommodate a mobility disability from losing vacancy control.

== Rent control in California ==
Costa-Hawkins is the key state legislation which serves to guide the operative provisions and practice of rent control in California. Yet it is the local governments, for the most part the cities, which actually write and adopt the specific rent control laws.

=== Legal context ===
==== Declared purposes ====
A local rent control ordinance may explicitly declare its purpose. Stated or implied is the finding, or assumption, that the rent control being enacted will in fact improve the community's well-being.

Usually rent control is a city-made law (a municipal ordinance) aimed at mitigating the disruptive effect, on neighborhoods and on individual renters, of escalating or fluctuating prices in the residential rental market. It may also seek to promote the maintenance of safe and habitable dwelling units during housing shortages.

An example of such city intent is San Francisco's Residential Rent Stabilization and Arbitration Ordinance (SFRO), enacted in 1979 as an emergency ordinance amending the San Francisco Administrative Code. It found that, in the face of tight markets and significant rental increases prior to rent control, "some tenants attempt to pay requested rent increases, but as a consequence must expend less on other necessities of life. This situation has had a detrimental effect on substantial numbers of renters in the City, especially creating hardships on senior citizens, persons on fixed incomes and low and moderate income households".

==== Constitutional limits ====
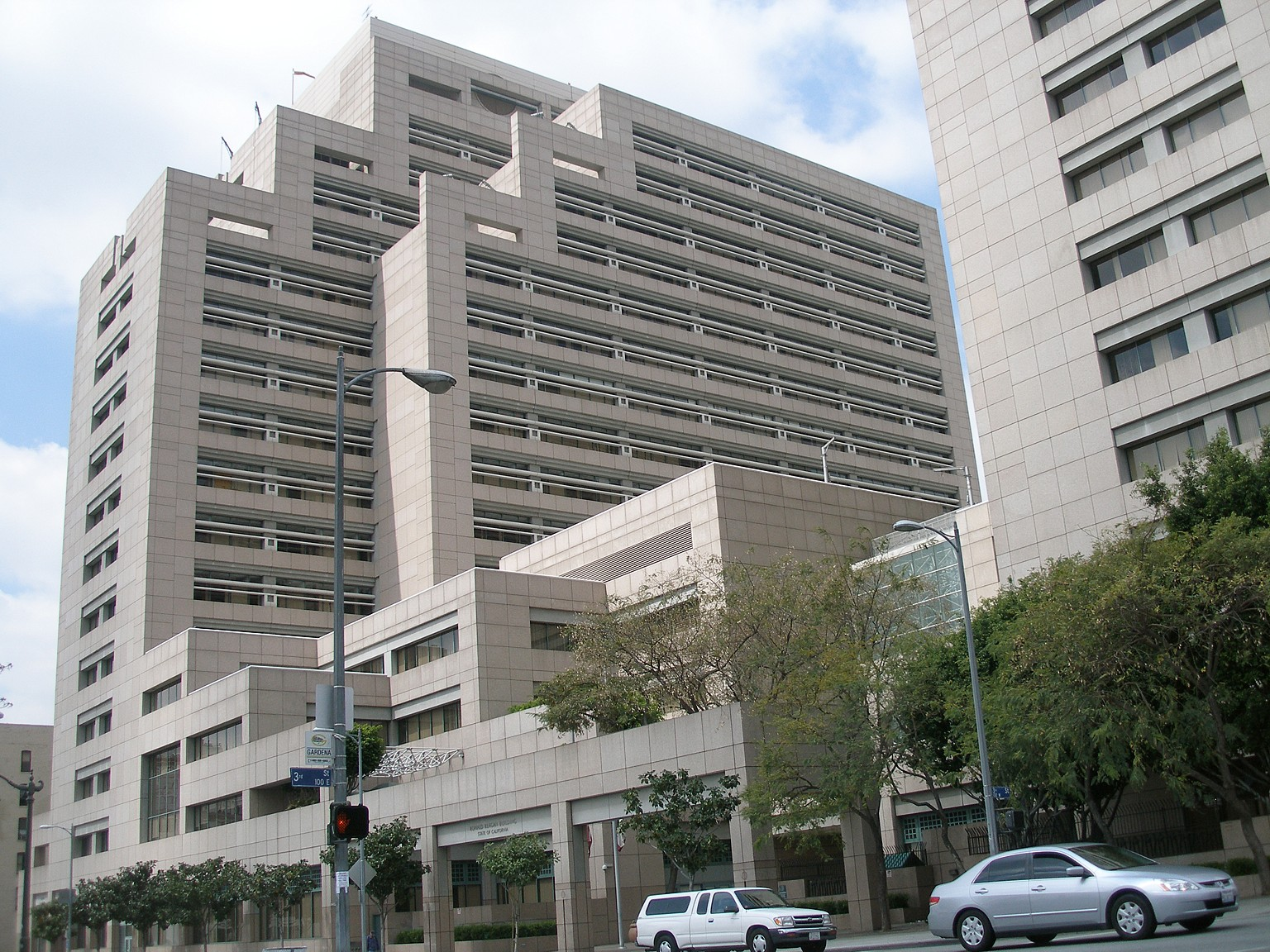
A site of the Supreme Court on S. Spring St. in Los Angeles.

For the California State Assembly its analyst Stephen Holloway commented on the constitutional and legal context of rent control, specifically between the state and local governments (e.g., cities). When Costa–Hawkins was enacted, existing California law made "no statutory provision for, but does not prohibit, the adoption of local rent control ordinances. Case law, Birkenfeld v. City of Berkeley (1976) 17 Cal. 3d 129, held that rent control is a proper exercise of a local government's police power if it is reasonably calculated to eliminate excessive rents and at the same time provide landlords with just and reasonable returns on their properties."

In the 1997 Kavanau case, a rental property owner challenged the City of Santa Monica's rent control law as a form of "taking" or inverse condemnation prohibited by the federal Constitution. The California Supreme Court affirmed the rulings by lower state courts in favor of the city. In the 2005 H.N. and Frances C. Berger Foundation case, the California Court of Appeal upheld an ordinance which provided that the city council sitting as a rent board would determine what was fair, just, and reasonable regarding an owner's comparable return on investment. The ordinance did not establish a specific formula or procedure to apply when faced with a requested rent increase, but instead stated eleven factors to consider. Here the board had then relied on an expert's opinion.

=== Usual provisions ===
Percentage. A maximum permitted price increase may be expressed as a percentage of the existing rent. For example, Alameda 5%, Hayward 5%, Los Angeles 3%, Los Gatos 5%. In 2016 San Jose lowered the allowable annual rent increase from 8% to 5% of existing rent. In 2017 in Beverly Hills by an emergency ordinance, the rent raise maximum plunged from 10% to 3%.

US CPI from 1913 (in blue), its percentage annual change (in red)

CPI. Alternatively, rent raise limits may be directly keyed to changes in the cost of living, as measured by the Consumer Price Index (CPI). Since 1980 in California the CPI has generally been lower than 5%. Examples of rent control ordinances using CPI as an index: Oakland, Mountain View, Richmond. In San Francisco the SFRO limits annual increases to the lesser of 60% of the CPI or 7% of existing rent. Similarly, the Berkeley Rent Board allows an annual increase of 65% of CPI.

Vacancy control, in which the amount of rent charged for a rental unit (rather than for a tenancy) is strictly regulated by local government, is discussed below in "Vacancy control prior to the Act".

==== Other elements ====
Every city or county with some variety of 'rent control' has its own, crafted law which may differ significantly in scope and content. Among the other issues a 'rent control' law might address:

- additional exclusions,
- rent mediation boards,
- condition of premises,
- rent registries,
- just cause terminations,
- relocation allowance,
- vacancy control.

Just cause terminations. A no-cause (or no-fault) rental termination by the owner is one that does not state a "just cause" (such as non-payment of rent, or a tenant-created nuisance). A city may require some form of "just cause" be noticed by an owner in order to terminate. But "just cause" is not required of evictions under state law. Other justifications may constitute "just cause", e.g.: (a) pursuant to government order; (b) to allow the owner's family to occupy the unit. Owners claim these laws limit their ability to deal with problem tenants who disturb their neighbors, e.g., by nuisance, domestic violence, criminal activity.

Relocation allowance. A city ordinance may require the owner to pay the departing tenant an allowance for moving and similar expenses, e.g., in event of no-fault termination. Each city has its own specifics. The tenant will not receive such an allowance in the event of "just cause" terminations, where the tenant is at fault (such as non-payment of rent, or creating a nuisance). But an owner's decision to end an existing tenancy (by written notice, by a court's eviction order) without the tenant being at fault, might trigger an owner's duty to pay the allowance. Withdrawal of a unit from the residential rental market is governed by the Ellis Act.

Vacancy control. Discussed below at "Vacancy control prior to the Act".

=== Opposition to rent control ===
Most economists believe rent control reduces the supply of housing over time, and students of economics are taught this analysis early on in their instruction. Housing industry advocates rely on this analysis to justify laws like Costa-Hawkins, which restrict the ability of municipalities to enact rent control. Across the U.S., these groups have been successful in drastically limiting or completely outlawing rent control since the 1950s.

However, housing officials have disputed the methodology of the prevailing economic argument, and in California, housing officials have claimed the inability to manage housing costs via rent control has exacerbated the ongoing housing crisis. For this reason, renter's rights groups have advocated for expansion of rent control, resulting in the unsuccessful 2018 ballot referendum Proposition 10 which would have directly repealed Costa-Hawkins.

=== List of California cities ===
Over the last fifty years, out of a total of 482 California cities, perhaps two-dozen have enacted rent control ordinances, or lesser laws. A city may later discontinue its rent control, e.g., Santa Rosa voted to repeal its new rent control law in 2017.

This survey was completed circa October 2018. Since the severe economic consequences of the COVID-19 pandemic, city councils have adjusted to the changed circumstances. Especially, the State of California has established a temporary eviction moratorium.

==== With rent-control ordinances ====
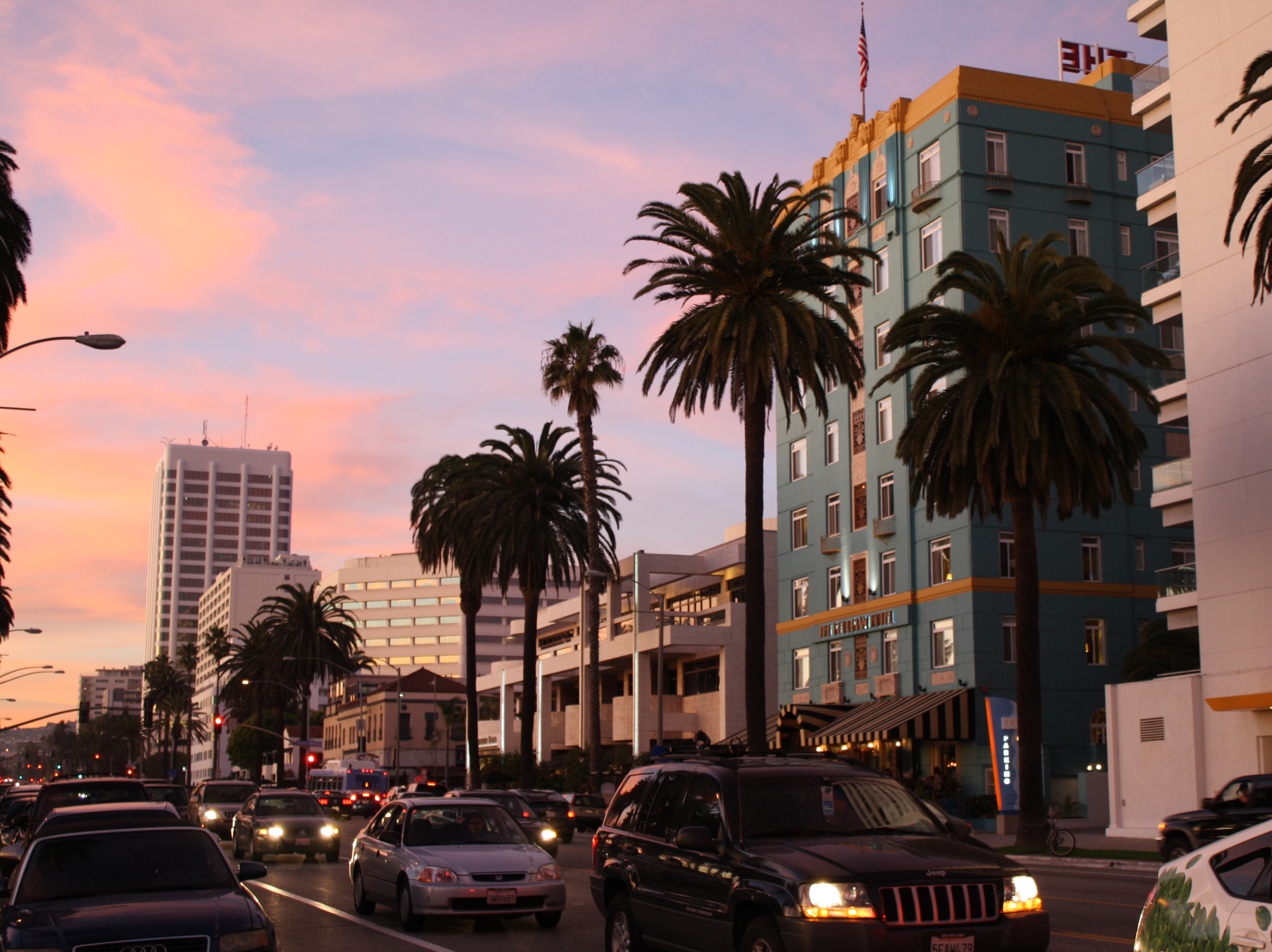
Santa Monica: Ocean Avenue

Sixteen cities are currently listed as rent controlled by the State of California:

These are: Alameda, Berkeley, Beverly Hills, East Palo Alto, Hayward, Los Angeles, Los Gatos, Mountain View, Oakland, Palm Springs, Richmond. San Francisco, San Jose, Santa Ana, Santa Monica, and West Hollywood.

Sacramento adopted the Tenant Protection and Relief Act August 13, 2019.

Additionally, Campbell (does not have rent control per se, but offers a mediation service), Fremont (rejected rent control in 2017), and Thousand Oaks (has limited rent control: mostly just for mobile home parks).

==== With limited rent control ====
Two examples of the many cities with rent control only for mobile home parks: Cotati, Thousand Oaks.

==== With non-rent elements ====
Some cities have rental housing laws that do not control the amount of rent per se. Accordingly, these six have a mediation service: Campbell, Fremont, Gardena, Palo Alto, San Leandro, Union City. Definitions differ as to whether this would even count as "rent control". As noted above, Palo Alto declares that it has no rent control, but it does offers mediation over rent raises. On the other hand, Fremont lists as the third of six purposes for its mediation services: "Limit rent increases to fair and reasonable amounts."

Glendale's ordinance prohibits an eviction without just cause. But, like Palo Alto, Glendale declined 'rent control'. Almost all rent-controlled cities also prohibit evictions without just cause. Among California cities which do not control the rent amount, but do prohibit no-cause evictions: Glendale, San Diego, Union City.

==== That refused rent control ====
Within the last few years, these cities either voted to repeal a rent control ordinance, or otherwise decided against rent control: Fremont (2017), Glendale (2013), Palo Alto (2017), and Santa Rosa (2017).

From the section on non-rent elements (mediation and just cause eviction), depending on definitions, these cities might be added here (to those that refuse to actually control the rent amount): Campbell, Gardena, San Leandro, and Union City.

During the years from 1977 to 1983, the "voters of 22 cities [rejected] 27 proposed rent control initiatives." Among those cities that then avoided rent control: Pasadena (1977), Santa Barbara (1978), Santa Cruz (1979), Long Beach (1980), and San Diego (1980).

== Effect of the Costa–Hawkins Act ==
The major purposes of the Act were: to eliminate vacancy control and thereby reestablish an intermittent role for market forces (supply and demand) in setting the rental price; and, to exempt certain categories of rental units from rent control, e.g., new construction, and single family dwellings and condominiums. The exemption for new units sought to encourage housing supply.

=== Vacancy control prior to the Act ===
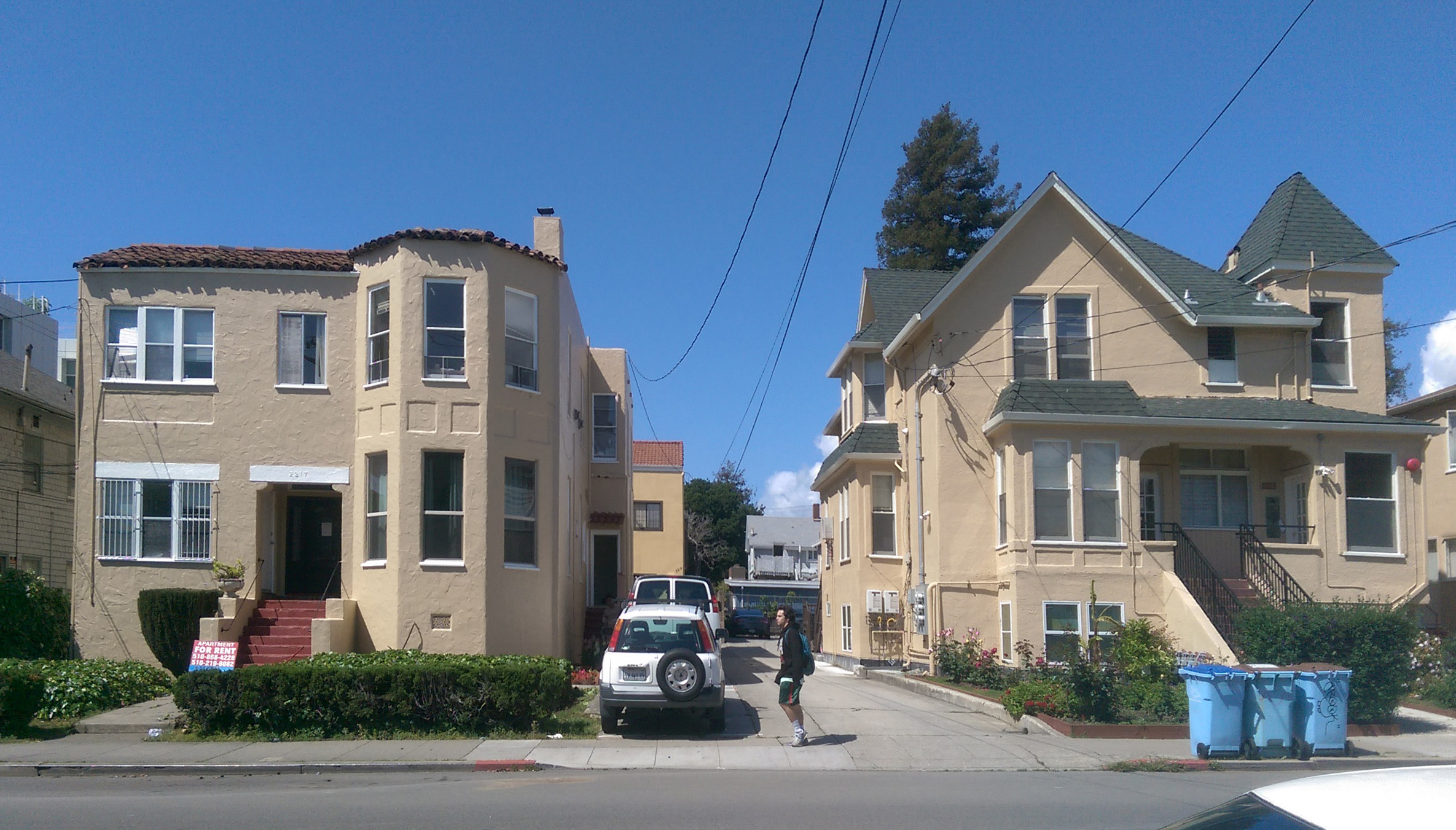
Berkeley: Dwight Way rental.

Most rent control ordinances (deemed moderate) limit an owner's ability to increase the rent to an existing tenant. Yet some strict rent control regimes also limited the rent a landlord could charge on the open market, that is, after the apartment became vacant by the voluntary exit of the prior tenant, or vacant by a just-cause eviction. Hence, strict was also called vacancy control. The controlled rental amount thus became specific not only to a particular tenancy, but also to a specific rental unit.

Under such a "strict" regime, market forces are excluded from price determination (except for exempt categories, such as newly built units). Prior to the enactment of Costa–Hawkins, such strict vacancy control had existed in five cities: Berkeley, Santa Monica, Cotati, East Palo Alto and West Hollywood.

=== Rent control elements denied to cities ===
Costa–Hawkins preempted local laws to allow 'vacancy decontrol', i.e., it abolished "vacancy control". Accordingly, the Act permits landlords to "establish the initial rental rate for a dwelling or unit" following voluntary departure by the prior tenants or following for cause evictions. For cities then with vacancy control, this preemption started the process of "vacancy decontrol" which was phased-in over three years. Accordingly, on January 1, 1999, it went into full effect.

The Act additionally exempted from municipal rent control certain kinds of dwelling units, namely, "separately alienable" units, i.e., single family houses and condominiums. The Act also exempted new construction, i.e., dwelling units with a certificate of occupancy issued after February 1, 1995.

=== Rent control elements retained by cities ===
The power to determine most of the elements of rent control (mentioned above) were left to the cities by the Act. Cities remain in control of changes to the rental amount of a tenancy, under constitutional limits. Cities possess a substantive jurisdiction to regulate evictions, and an owner's ability to otherwise end a tenancy. Accordingly, cities could prohibit an owner from terminating a tenant without "just cause". Also in terminations, the city by ordinance may place costs on an owner, and grant rights to a tenant, e.g., the relocation allowance.

Each California city may independently adopt and enact its own rent control ordinance. Those in force range across the spectrum. Counties in California may also enact rent control laws, in accordance with state law.

== Court interpretations of Costa–Hawkins ==
In the two decades the Act has been on the books, a number of lawsuits have been filed citing it. Of those appealed, some became written case law. The 2009 Palmer case 'unexpectedly' upset local laws for inclusionary zoning per rental units. A few other cases are also discussed here. There remain questions about how to apply the Costa–Hawkins statute within the larger legal framework, e.g., its possible interaction with various, adjacent state statutes, and with varieties of municipal rent control and other ordinances.

=== Palmer (2009): rentals in inclusionary housing ===
==== 'New construction' exemption applies ====
In Palmer/Sixth Street Properties LP v. City of Los Angeles (2009), the issue involved how to apply Costa–Hawkins to an inclusionary housing ordinance of the City of Los Angeles. Inclusionary housing laws (also called inclusionary zoning) apply to the construction of new multi-unit developments and seek to mandate the inclusion of some affordable units with price controls, along with a larger number of units to be sold on the free market. About one-third of California cities and counties have inclusionary zoning ordinances. Such laws might require, beside affordable units for sale, units for rent. In this case, a Los Angeles housing ordinance in effect mandated that sixty rentals for low-income tenants be included in Geoff Palmer's 350-unit development west of downtown.

The appellate court held, however, that the exemption from rent control of new construction under Costa–Hawkins applied to the particular facts of this case. Thus the city could not enforce its housing mandate against the real estate developer.

==== 2013 bill to restore inclusionary rentals ====
The Palmer case thus removed rentals from the usual formula of inclusionary housing. Critics claimed, however, that the appellate court's opinion was "widely viewed as a misapplication of the Costa–Hawkins Act to a situation it was never meant to address." It sparked a political response in 2013 that aimed to adjust the Act. Accordingly, Assembly Bill 1229 was passed by the California legislature "to re-establish the legitimacy of affordable housing requirements for rentals."

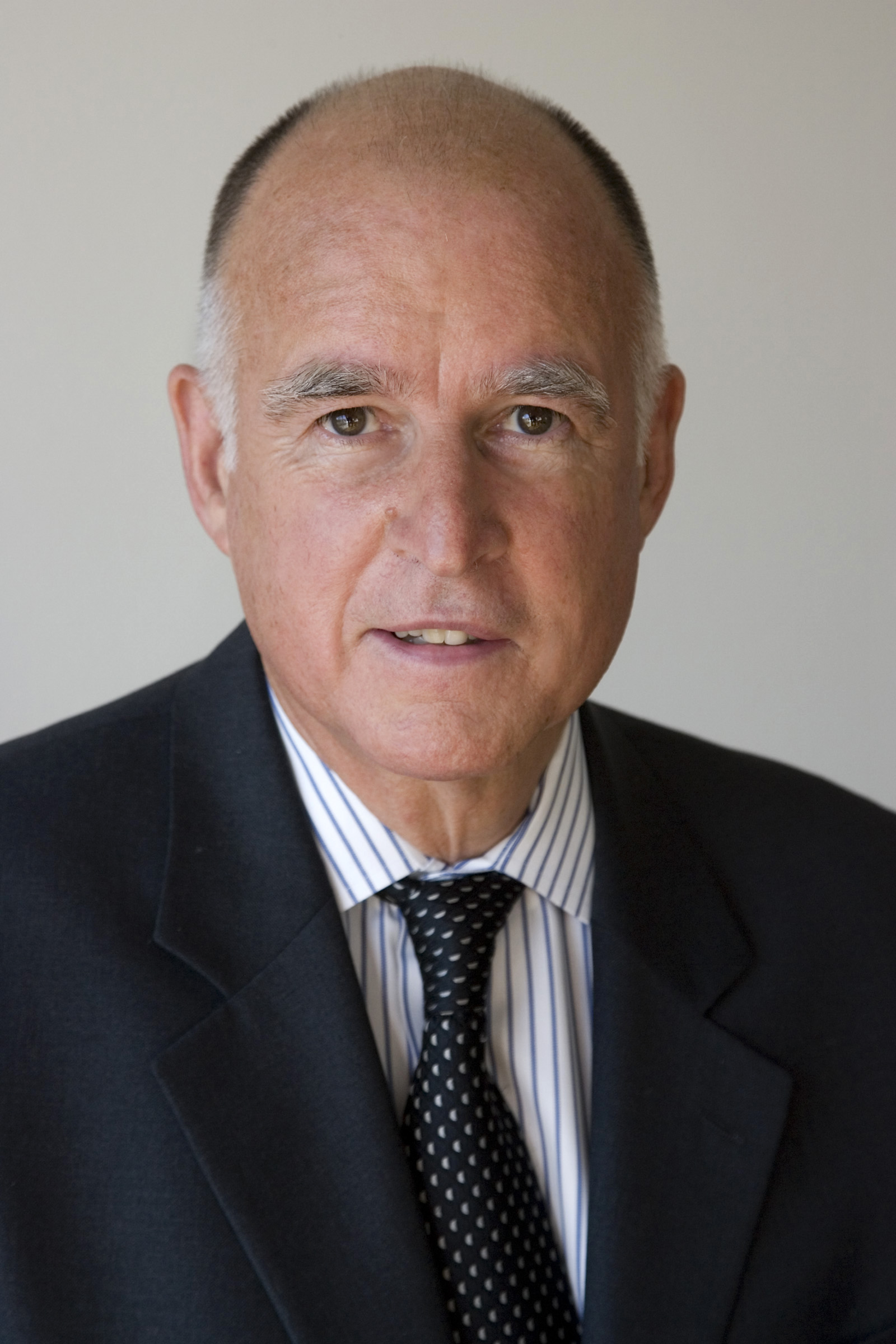
Jerry Brown, c.2015.

==== Governor Brown's 2013 veto message ====
In October 2013 Governor Jerry Brown vetoed the bill. He said, "As Mayor of Oakland I saw how difficult it can be to attract developments to low and middle income communities. Requirements to developers to include below-market units in their projects can exacerbate these challenges, even while not meaningfully increasing the amount of affordable housing in a given community."

Advocates of affordable housing felt stymied. Yet there were alternatives that avoided the exemption for new construction under Costa–Hawkins: "the builder receives either financial assistance" or other valuable consideration such as a density bonus, and "agrees by contract with the city to restrict rents."

==== 2017 bill 'fixes' Palmer re rentals ====
The legislature in 2017 approved a bill (AB 1505) that modified the court's ruling in Palmer. This bill restores to local governments the ability to require inclusionary rental housing for low income households, hence in effect setting their rent amount. Yet it allows for state oversight by a review (per a feasibility study) of such municipal requirements if applicable to over 15% of the units of a development project. Governor Brown then signed the bill which was among a package of fifteen housing bills for California in 2017.

=== Certificate of occupancy: Burien LLC v. Wiley ===
In 2014 the California Court of Appeals clarified the Act's provision concerning a rent-control exemption based on a "certificate of occupancy issued after February 1, 1995." The provision was held to apply only to certificates of occupancy that preceded the residential use of the unit.

In Burien, LCC v. James A. Wiley the Landlord contended that this Costa–Hawkins exemption applies to buildings converted from apartments to condominiums (both residential uses), when a new certificate is issued for the latter. The court reasoned that the purpose of the statute's exemption is to promote construction and development that increase the supply of rental housing, not to promote token reclassification without such a result. "We conclude that section 1954.52, subdivision (a)(1), refers to certificates of occupancy issued prior to residential use of the unit."

=== Mosser rule: children per 'vacancy control' ===
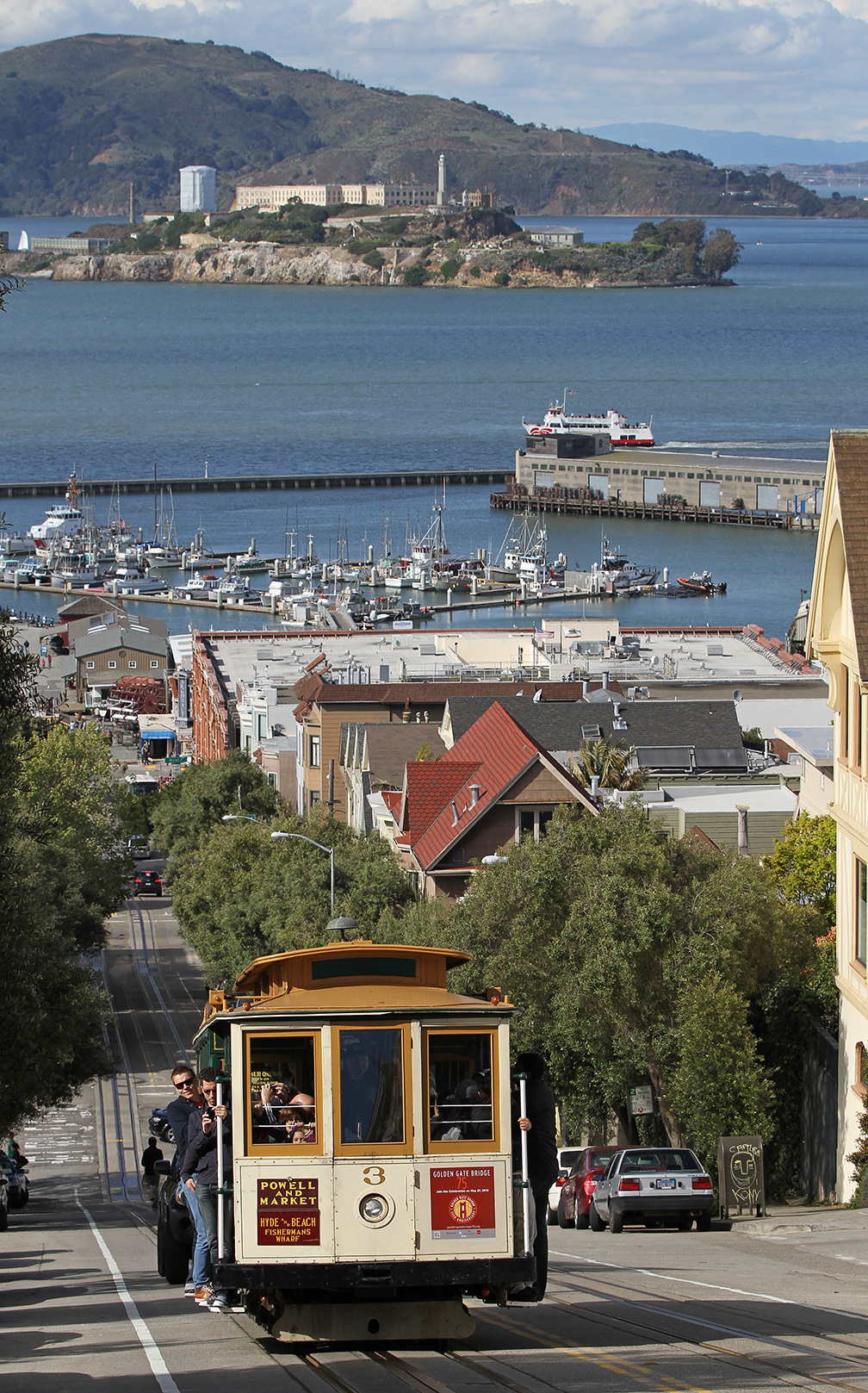
San Francisco.

In January 2015, the First District Court of Appeals decided that, while Costa–Hawkins allows a landlord to establish a new rental rate where the "original occupants" on the lease no longer permanently reside at the premises, this decontrol was not available to the landlord where a minor child, who moved in with his parents at the commencement of the lease, remained there after they had vacated. In Mosser Companies v. San Francisco Rent Stabilization and Arbitration Board, the appellate court affirmed the trial court's judgment. Commentary on the case states that Costa–Hawkins, "as written, does not permit vacancy decontrol until all lawful occupants vacate the premises." This, despite the landlord's argument that this constituted an intergenerational tenancy of a rent-controlled premises.

The Mosser rule was then expanded in July 2015 by the First District Court of Appeals, in T & A Drolapas v. San Francisco Residential Rent Stabilization and Arb. Bd.. This decision dealt with similar facts (a landlord attempting to raise the rent of the son of original lessees who had moved out). The court first found that, as the family had moved in prior to the enactment of Costa–Hawkins, even if the son was merely a subtenant, he would have been grandfathered in. Such a "subtenant" could be an "original occupant". The court, however, went on to find that he was also an original occupant under the Mosser rule, even though, unlike in Mosser, there was no evidence that the landlord knew about the son when the tenancy commenced.

=== Mak: "Just cause" notice and 'vacancy control' ===
In the September 2015 case Jason Mak v. City of Berkeley Rent Stabilization Board, the First District Court of Appeals interpreted Costa–Hawkins in the context of an evidentiary presumption in Berkeley's rent ordinance that presumes that, where a tenant has moved out after a termination notice, the tenant moved out because of the notice. One accepted way for a landlord to take possession of a rental unit is to use an "owner move-in" eviction, which is recognized as "just cause" to terminate a rent-controlled tenancy. Of course, the landlords are then required to move in and make the rental unit their residence for some minimum period (e.g., 36 continuous months). In such event, the Costa–Hawkins Act will thereafter decontrol the unit, i.e., allow it to be rented at market rate. Such decontrol is limited to "just cause" terminations, or where the prior tenant freely decides to moves out. The owner cannot, therefore, without "just cause" initiate the termination of a rent-controlled tenancy, then rent it at market rate to a new tenant.

The landlord in Mak served the tenant a notice of termination for an 'owner move-in'. But the landlord rescinded the notice, then entered into a move-out agreement with the tenant, in which the tenant recited that he was not moving out because of the prior notice. The landlord, however, did not move-in, but instead rented the premises to a new tenant. The Berkeley ordinance in question, when applied to these facts, raised the presumption that the prior tenant moved out because of the owner move-in notice. The landlords were not able to rebut this presumption when their new tenants challenged the validity of their market-rate rent. Accordingly, the vacant unit was still linked to the amount of the previous controlled rent, a situation to which the new tenants were entitled.

== 2010s housing shortage and repeal efforts ==
=== Shortage of affordable housing, and HAA ===
The housing cycle that began with the crisis of the 1970s and 1980s has apparently come full circle. A housing shortage has recurred and apparently reached the crisis stage. In a 2014 California treatise on real estate development, the authors opined that "[C]ommunities across California continue to confront the challenge posed by a scarcity of housing, particularly of affordable housing. In the last several decades, housing production in the state has lagged behind population and job growth, resulting in a housing deficit. ... While all citizens feel the impact of this housing shortage at some level, those with incomes at the lowest end of the economic spectrum of often bear the brunt of the shortage."

Regarding the shortage in California, the Housing Accountability Act (HAA) was recently strengthened by amendments. Its 2016 version states: "(a) The legislature finds and declares all of the following: ¶(1) The lack of housing, including emergency shelters, is a critical problem that threatens the economic, environmental, and social quality of life in California. ¶(2) California housing has become the most expensive in the nation. ... ."

Here the legislature aims to overcome the shortage by increasing the housing supply. The HAA imposes detailed limits on a city's power to restrict new housing construction. The recent HAA amendments, signed by Gov. Brown, were sponsored by three Democrats: Nancy Skinner, Senate – East Bay, Raul Bocanegra, Assembly – Pacoima, and Tom Daly, Assembly – Santa Ana.

Yet it's said that the HAA and similar bills subsequently introduced will not be enough.

=== Efforts to repeal Costa–Hawkins ===
==== By the legislature ====
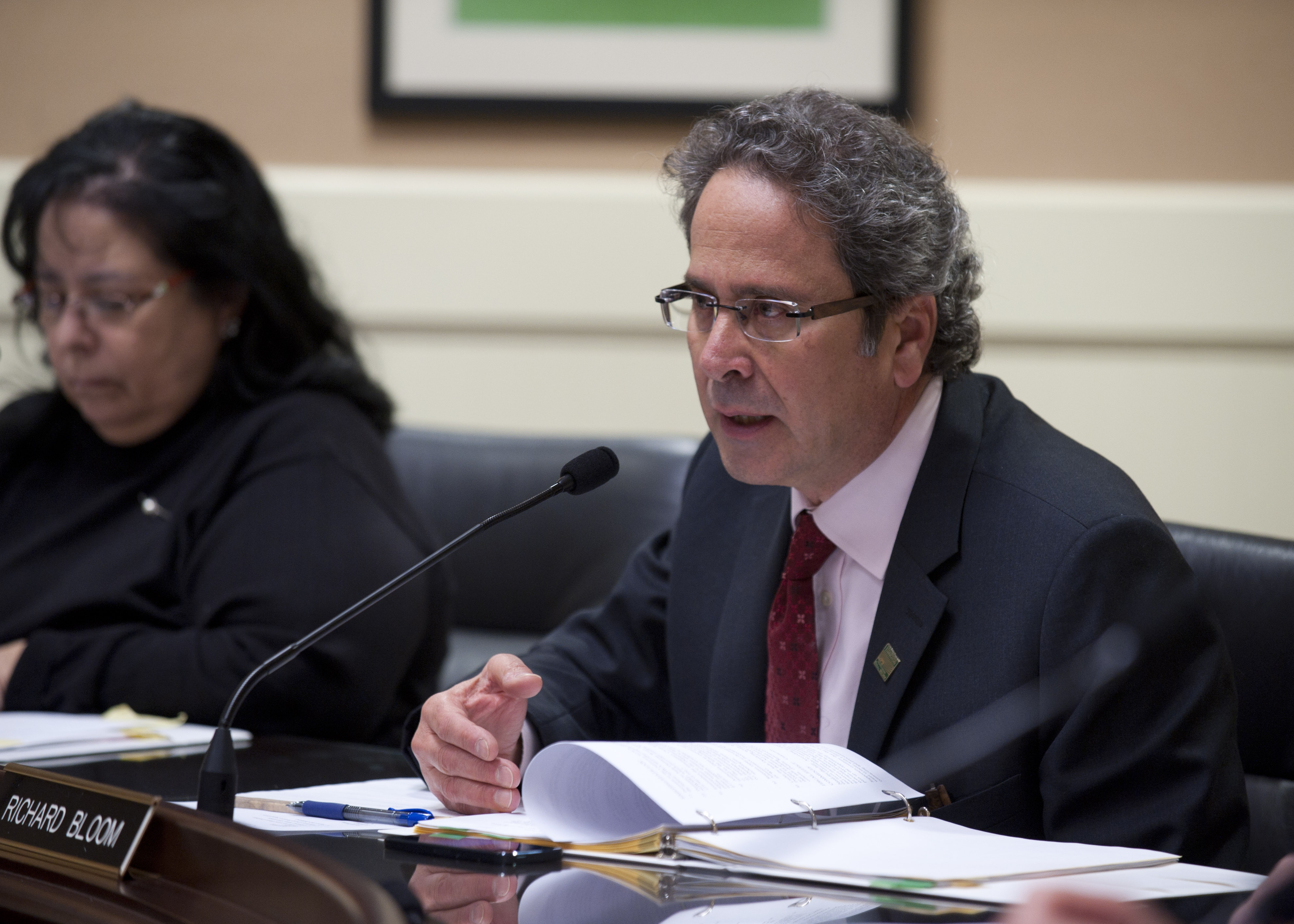
Richard Bloom, Assembly member; former Mayor of Santa Monica.

On February 17, 2017, in the California Assembly, Democratic members Richard Bloom, Rob Bonta, and David Chiu introduced AB 1506, a bill that if passed would simply repeal wholesale the Costa–Hawkins Rental Housing Act of 1995. Given the vacancy decontrol and exclusions of Costa–Hawkins, its repeal would leave local governments free to control much of the residential rental pricing regulations, their reach, and similar issues. By April the bill was facing stiff opposition and bleak prospects in the legislature. It was then "parked in committee" until next year.

On January 11, 2018, chairperson Chiu (San Francisco) of the Assembly's Housing and Community Development Committee put Bloom's bill to a vote. It failed to pass. The two Republicans voted against. Democrats Ed Chau (Arcadia) and Jim Wood (Healdsburg) abstained, and commented that rent control would do nothing to increase the supply of housing and may discourage new construction at a time the state needs it the most. Perhaps a thousand proponents representing the opposing sides attended the vote.

==== By initiative: Prop 10 ====
On October 23, 2017, the Alliance of Californians for Community Empowerment (ACCE) filed papers with the state Attorney General for a ballot measure which would repeal wholesale the 1995 Costa–Hawkins Act. ACCE calls the current rents across California too high, and out of control. To qualify for a November 2018 vote by the public, 365,880 signatures are said to be required.

Proponents announced in late April that they have enough signatures to qualify an initiative to repeal Costa Hawkins. Its supporters named it the "Affordable Housing Act". The initiative was Proposition 10 on the General Election ballot of November 2018.

A survey conducted in October 2018 by the Los Angeles Times and the University of Southern California found that 28% of eligible California voters believed that the lack of rent control was the main contributing factor to California's housing affordability crisis. 24% of respondents believed that the most significant cause of the housing crisis was insufficient funding of low-income housing; only 13% believed it was insufficient new housing.

On November 6, Prop 10 was decisively defeated, reported the Los Angeles Times; it endorsed the measure. The preliminary results with 100% of precincts reporting: 38% or 2,675,378 voted for, and 62% or 4,310,298 voted against.

Carol Galante, a professor of urban policy at UC Berkeley's Terner Center for Housing Innovation postulated that Prop 10 may have been defeated because it would have opened the door for government regulation of rents on single-family homes; because 40% of the rental housing stock nationwide consists of single-family homes (predominantly owned by private individuals), this resulted in a large number of owners with the ability to vote against this proposition.

Proposition 10 Results by county No: 80–90%; 70–80%; 60–70%; 50–60%; Yes: 50–60%

==== By initiative: Prop 21 ====
A renter named Mario talks about his experience with rent gouging in California in 2019.

The same activists who advocated for Proposition 10 (both financially backed by the AIDS Healthcare Foundation), in the wake of the failure to attract majority support, decided to put another initiative to amend the Costa-Hawkins Act on the ballot in the 2020 California elections. This initiative, Proposition 21, was an attempt to have a more limited and partial repeal of Costa-Hawkins, as opposed to a complete repeal which was on the ballot in 2018. This measure also failed, 59.85% "no" to 40.15% "yes".

==== By initiative: Prop 33 ====
Another initiative in the November 2024 general election, Proposition 33, was an attempt to repeal of Costa-Hawkins. This measure also failed, 62.% "no" to 38% "yes".

== Studies on effects of California Rent Control (not limited to Costa-Hawkins) ==
=== Research published in 1990, 1999, 2000 ===
Historically, there have been two types of rent control - vacancy control (where the rent level of a unit is controlled irrespective of whether the tenant remains in the unit or not) and vacancy decontrol (where the rent level is controlled only while the existing tenant remains in the unit). In California prior to 1997, both types were allowed (the Costa/Hawkins bill of that year phased out vacancy control provisions). A 1990 study of Santa Monica, CA showed that vacancy control in that city protected existing tenants (lower increases in rent and longer stability). However, the policy potentially discouraged investors from building new rental units.

A 2000 study that compared the border areas of four California cities having vacancy control provisions (Santa Monica, Berkeley, West Hollywood, East Palo Alto) with the border areas of adjoining jurisdictions (two of which allowed vacancy decontrol, including Los Angeles, and two of which had no rent control) showed that existing tenants in the vacancy control cities had lower rents and longer tenure than in the comparison areas. Thus, the ordinances helped protect the existing tenants and, therefore, increased community stability. However, there were fewer new rental units created in the border areas of the vacancy controlled cities over the 10-year period.

A 1999 study that compared the effects of local rent control measures (both vacancy control and vacancy decontrol) with other local growth management measures in 490 California cities and counties (including all the largest ones) showed that rent control was stronger than individual land use restrictions (but not the aggregate effect of all growth restrictions) in reducing the number of rental units constructed between 1980 and 1990. The measures (both rent control and growth management) helped displace new construction from the metropolitan areas to the interiors of the state with low income and minority populations being particularly impacted.

=== 2017 study of San Francisco housing market ===
In 1994, San Francisco voters passed a ballot initiative which expanded the city's existing rent control laws to include small multi-unit apartments with four or less units, built prior to 1980. (about 30% of the city's rental housing stock at the time). In 2017, Stanford economics researcher Rebecca Diamond and others published a study which examined the effects of this specific rent control law on the rental units newly controlled compared to similar style units (multi-unit apartments with four or less units) not under rent control (built after 1980), as well as this law's effect on the total city rental stock, and on overall rent prices in the city, covering the years from 1995 to 2012.

They found that while San Francisco's rent control laws benefited tenants who had rent controlled units, it also resulted in landlords removing 30% of the units in the study from the rental market, (by conversion to condos or TICs) which led to a 15% citywide decrease in total rental units, and a 7% increase in citywide rents.

The authors stated that "This substitution toward owner occupied and high-end new construction rental housing likely fueled the gentrification of San Francisco, as these types of properties cater to higher income individuals."

The authors also noted that "...forcing landlords to provide insurance against rent increases leads to large losses to tenants. If society desires to provide social insurance against rent increases, it would be more desirable to offer this subsidy in the form of a government subsidy or tax credit. This would remove landlords’ incentives to decrease the housing supply and could provide households with the insurance they desire."

== Coronavirus/COVID-19: temporary eviction moratorium ==
Governor Gavin Newsom on March 4, 2020, signed an executive order N-44-20 on COVID-19, declaring a California state of emergency. It contained provisions for a statewide temporary eviction moratorium. Although court proceedings, e.g., unlawful detainers, could commence or continue, a judgment against a tenant could not result in an order to evict. On March 16, by N-28-20, Newsom allowed California cities to write local ordinances to craft their own moratoriums. On June 30, Newsom by N-71-20 extended the original moratorium until September 30, 2020.

On April 6, the Judicial Council suspended statewide proceedings for evictions and foreclosures. This body, headed by the Chief Justice Tani Cantil-Sakauye, makes policy for California courts. The suspension included summons, judgments and lock-out orders, and was to be effective for 90 days after the emergency. Housing providers, however, may still serve a defaulting tenant with a 3-day Notice to Pay Rent or Quit, and file papers with the court.

Two lawsuits have been filed challenging the moratorium orders. On June 8, the Apartment Association of Greater Los Angeles filed against the City of Los Angeles over its local ordinance. A week later the Pacific Legal Foundation contested the Judicial Council's suspension of legal proceedings regarding all evictions. The latter alleges that a malfeasant tenant is allowed to commit illegal acts, create nuisance, and damage property with impunity.

Over 150 California cities and counties have since enacted eviction moratoriums to be effective during the pandemic emergency. Such local ordinances may impose more restrictions than the State moratorium. The Counties of Los Angeles, Ventura, and San Bernardino have adopted such legislation, and as have 45 cities located therein.

Western Center on Law and Poverty provides support for the moratorium, and Legal Services of Northern California has developed a fact sheet designed for tenants in order to comply with requirements of the moratorium and suspension.

== Bibliography ==
- W. Dennis Keating, Rent Control in California. Responding to the Crisis (Institute of Governmental Studies, University of California, Berkeley 1983), 24 pages. Accessed 2017-10-17.
- Allan David Heskin, Tenants and the American Dream. Ideology and the tenant movement (New York: Paeger 1983), re Santa Monica.
- Paul L. Niebanck, editor, The Rent Control Debate (University of North Carolina 1985), the editor was a UCSC professor.
- Peter Dreier, "Rent Deregulation in California and Massachusetts: Politics, Policy, and Impacts – Part I" (1997), "Part II" (1997), at International and Public Policy Center, Occidental College, Los Angeles. Accessed 2017-11-6.
- Cecily Talbert Barclay & Matthew S. Gray, Curtin's California Land Use and Planning Law (Point Arena: Solano Press 34th ed., 2014).
- West's California Jurisprudence 3d, v. 42: Landlord & Tenant (Toronto: Thomson & Reuters 2016, update 2017).
- David Brown, Janet Portman, Nils Rosenquest, The California Landlord's Law Book (Berkeley: Nolo Press 2017).
- Nancy C. Lenvin & Myron Moskovitz, "Practicing under Rent and Eviction Control Laws," Chapter 7 in California Landlord-Tenant Practice (Oakland: California Continuing Education of the Bar: updated 2017).
