= 2016 California Proposition 61 =

Failed prescription drug price limits

Proposition 61
- State Prescription Drug Purchase Standards

Results
Choice	Votes	%
Yes	6,254,342	46.80%
No	7,109,642	53.20%
Valid votes	13,363,984	91.47%
Invalid or blank votes	1,246,525	8.53%
Total votes	14,610,509	100.00%
Registered voters/turnout	19,411,771	75.27%
County results
Yes
50–60%
No
70–80%
60–70%
50–60%

Proposition 61 was a California ballot proposition that appeared on the November 8, 2016 ballot. It would have prohibited the state of California from buying any prescription drug from a drug manufacturer at price over the lowest price paid for the drug by the United States Department of Veterans Affairs. It would have exempted managed care programs funded through Medi-Cal. According to the fiscal impact statement issued by California Legislative Analyst's Office, "potential for state savings of an unknown amount depending on (1) how the measure’s implementation challenges are addressed and (2) the responses of drug manufacturers regarding the provision and pricing of their drugs."

Proposition 61 was rejected by a vote of 47 to 53 percent.

== Reactions & Analysis ==
=== Supporters ===
==== Individuals ====
- Bernie Sanders
- Mike Honda
- Robert Reich

==== Organizations ====
- AIDS Healthcare Foundation
- California Nurses Association/National Nurses Organizing Committee

==== Parties ====
- California Peace and Freedom Party
- Progressive Democrats of America

=== Opponents ===
==== Organizations ====
- California NAACP
- California Medical Association
- Veterans of Foreign Wars, Department of California
- California Taxpayers Association

==== Parties ====
- California Republican Party
- California Libertarian Party
- Alice B. Toklas LGBT Democratic Club

=== Public Opinion ===
Public opinion on Proposition 61
Poll source	Date(s) administered	Sample size	Margin of error	% support	% opposition	% Undecided/Don't Know
Field/YouGov	October 25–31, 2016	998 LV	N/A	47%	47%	6%
Hoover Institution/YouGov	October 4–14, 2016	1248 LV	± 3.28%	51%	24%	25%
Field/YouGov	September 7–13, 2016	943 LV	N/A	50%	16%	34%
USC Dornsife/Los Angeles Times (Note: Totals do not sum to 100% due to rounding)	September 1–8, 2016	1912 RV	± 3%	66%	23%	12%
