= AIDS Healthcare Foundation =

Nonprofit organization in Los Angeles

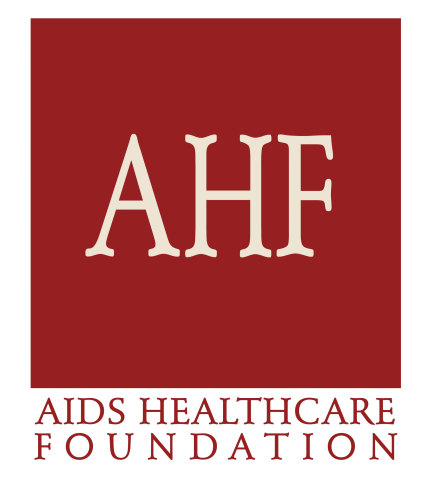
- Abbreviation: AHF
- Formation: February 1987; 39 years ago
- Founder: Chris Brownlie; Michael Weinstein
- Type: nonprofit organization
- Tax ID no.: 95-4112121
- Legal status: 501(c)(3)
- Purpose: To provide medical care for people living with HIV or AIDS. The organization aims to eradicate HIV/AIDS through its network of health care centers, pharmacies, prevention and testing services, healthcare contracts and other strategic partnerships.
- Headquarters: Los Angeles, California, U.S.
- Coordinates: 34.098787°N 118.325725°W
- Subsidiaries: AHF Pharmacy; Out of the Closet thrift stores Positive Healthcare; Housing is a Human Right; Healthy Housing Foundation
- Revenue: $2,453,114,039 (2023)
- Expenses: $2,335,113,309 (2023)
- Endowment: $350,192,851
- Employees: 2,446 (2019)
- Website: www.aidshealth.org

AIDS Healthcare Foundation (AHF) is a Los Angeles-based 501(c)(3) nonprofit organization that provides HIV/AIDS prevention, treatment, and advocacy services, in addition to humanitarian aid. As of 2026, AHF operates about 1,000 clinics, 79 outpatient healthcare centers, 67 pharmacies, and 26 Out of the Closet thrift stores across 16 U.S. states, Washington, D.C., Puerto Rico, and 50 countries in total, with over 5,000 employees, and provides care to more than three million patients. The organization's aim is to end the AIDS epidemic by ensuring access to quality healthcare, including HIV and STD testing, prescription of medications like Pre-exposure Prophylaxis (PrEP), and referrals to specialty pharmacies. AHF is a participant in and supporter of the 340B Drug Pricing Program, and the largest provider of PrEP in the United States, though its founder Michael Weinstein has received criticism for his initial opposition to the drug in the early 2010s. AHF operates the Out of the Closet thrift store chain to help fund its services.

Since 2012, AHF has become highly active in sponsoring and exclusively financing multiple high-profile ballot initiatives in two states, starting with a successful Los Angeles County initiative to require condoms in adult films (2012 Los Angeles Measure B), and then a similar statewide initiative which failed (2016 California Proposition 60). AHF ran two measures seeking to cap prescription drug prices (California Proposition 61 (2016) and Ohio Issue 2 (2017)), both of which failed. The organization has also pursued legal action against pharmaceutical companies and pharmacy benefit managers to reduce drug prices.

In 2017, AHF created a new organization named the Healthy Housing Foundation, which focuses on housing for homeless and low-income individuals. AHF also shifted its political advocacy focus to attempting to block certain housing construction through 2017 Los Angeles Measure S and lawsuits against several projects, as well as three statewide ballot initiatives seeking to allow for the expansion of rent control in California (2018 California Proposition 10, 2020 California Proposition 21, and 2024 California Proposition 33); all of which failed at the polls.

== History ==
=== Early years: AIDS Hospice Foundation and Chris Brownlie Hospice ===
During the late 1980s and early 1990s, AHF emerged as an advocate for gay and bisexual men who were hit hardest at the start of the HIV/AIDS epidemic. In 1987, activists Chris Brownlie, Michael Weinstein, Sharon Raphael, PhD, Mina Meyer, MA, and other advocates were among the earliest champions of the AIDS hospice movement. They co-founded the Los Angeles AIDS Hospice Committee, which was the catalyst for the AIDS Hospice Foundation that we know today as the AIDS Healthcare Foundation.

Members of the inaugural AIDS Hospice Committee—Brownlie, Weinstein, Myer, Raphael, Paul Coleman, and others—negotiated for the opening of Chris Brownlie Hospice by protesting and picketing of then-Supervisor Mike Antonovich's home. Following an emotional plea for hospice care to Los Angeles County Commission on AIDS, which included the Los Angeles County Board of Supervisors, they secured a $2 million commitment to provide AIDS care on the grounds of the Barlow Respiratory Hospital.

On December 26th, 1988, the 25-bed Chris Brownlie Hospice opened in the former nurses' dormitory at Barlow Respiratory Hospital and offered 24-hour medical and palliative care to people living through the final stages of AIDS. AHF opened two additional hospices: the Carl Bean House in 1992, and the Linn House in 1995. The Carl Bean House was named after Archbishop Carl Bean, D.Min, an American Protestant clergy, HIV/AIDS activist, and Broadway singer who founded the Minority AIDS Project (MAP). Located in South Central Los Angeles, MAP specifically focused on care for predominantly Black and Latino community members, accepting all terminal AIDS patients regardless if they had health insurance or not.

On November 26th, 1989, Brownlie died at the age of 39, because of AIDS-related complications. He was survived by his longtime partner and Brownlie Hospice co-founder, Phill Wilson, and his father, sister, brothers, countless friends and fellow AIDS activists. In addition to Brownlie, over 1,000 people had been given dignified, specialized, compassionate final care at the Chris Brownlie Hospice by the time it ended hospice operations in September 1996. The building that housed the Brownlie Hospice went through its own rebirths, housing various departments of AHF, including the headquarters for AHF's Public Health Division, before the organization officially turned the property back over to the City of Los Angeles with a sunset memorial ceremony on January 26th, 2013.

=== Expansion ===
As medical opportunities for managing HIV including anti-retroviral drugs became more available, AHF changed its mission to helping individuals with HIV/AIDS live well with the disease through advanced medical care. This shift was marked with the change of the Foundation's name to AIDS Healthcare Foundation in July 1990.

AHF operates the Out of the Closet thrift store chain. 96 cents of every dollar earned at the thrift stores goes to AHF's HIV/AIDS programs and housing services, on-site pharmacies, and free HIV testing. The first Out of the Closet thrift store opened in 1990 in Los Angeles' Atwater Village to benefit residents living with AIDS at the Chris Brownlie Hospice. In 1997, Out of the Closet thrift stores began offering free and anonymous HIV testing.

In 1991, AHF opened the Richard Polanco HIV Clinic as a place where people in the early stages of AIDS could receive treatment even without private health insurance.

In 2000, AHF opened its first pharmacy, a move that proved crucial to its underlying business model. The organization's main business is its network of pharmacies and clinics that provide primary care to patients, most of whom have their insurance claims paid by government insurance programs like Medicaid. The excess income from these patients has helped AHF provide free care to millions of patients—the greatest reach of any HIV/AIDS organization. AHF acquired the MOMS Pharmacy chain of pharmacies in 2012, and in 2013, rebranded the chain as AHF Pharmacy.

AHF sponsored HIV awareness-themed Rose Parade floats in 2012 and 2013, each winning the Queen's Trophy for best use of roses. The organization fashioned a tribute to actress Elizabeth Taylor, who championed HIV and AIDS programs in the 1980s.

In 2014, AHF made history during the Rose Parade by hosting a same-sex wedding on its float for the first time in the parade's history. The float, with the theme "Love is the Best Protection," won best presentation of color and color harmony through floral use. A longtime float participant, the organization has earned a reputation for thought-provoking messages surrounding healthcare, homelessness, gay rights, anti-violence, and other issues.

AHF produced the documentary film Keep The Promise: The Global Fight Against AIDS, depicting the AHF-sponsored protest of government anti-HIV funding levels and anti-HIV drug prices at the XIX International AIDS Conference, 2012. The film premiered on March 29th, 2013 at the Vail Film Festival.

In August 2024, AHF opened a new all-in-one facility in Austin, Texas, including an HIV healthcare center, pharmacy services, STI testing and treatment, and an Out of the Closet thrift store, where 96 cents of every dollar earned goes back into local patient care.

AHF's 2025 Rose Parade float, "Home Sweet Home," celebrated the 100th anniversary of Charlie Chaplin's 1925 film The Gold Rush and Chaplin's Little Tramp character, who is considered America's most famous (albeit fictional) homeless person. The float also promoted AHF's Healthy Housing Foundation and its work addressing the affordable housing and homelessness crises.

In January 2025, AHF received The King Center's Martin Luther King, Jr. Social Justice Award, the organization's highest recognition for contributions to social justice. The award was presented by Bernice King and recognized AHF's "transformative work in advancing health equity, combating HIV/AIDS, and championing the rights and dignity of underserved communities worldwide."

In October 2025, AHF opened its first clinic in Tennessee. Later that year, the organization opened a new testing and treatment location in Tampa, Florida, identifying west central Florida as one of the areas with the highest numbers of new HIV/AIDS cases each year.

In August 2026, AHF unveiled a first-of-its-kind mobile testing and treatment vehicle in South Florida, calling the mobile unit "Wellness on Wheels." The organization also opened a community pharmacy in Hell's Kitchen, New York, using a mechanical device to transport medication from the street-level pharmacy to patients and staff downstairs.

=== Global ===
In the early 2000s, AHF developed a program called Global Immunity, whose goal is to change the course of the HIV/AIDS epidemic by expanding access to treatment for those living with HIV across the globe. As of 2023, the organization operates clinics in 45 countries.

In 2001, AHF became the first international organization to sponsor an HIV/AIDS clinic in South Africa. The clinic, Ithembalabantu (Zulu for "People's Hope"), was opened in Umlazi, Durban where 10% of the population was infected with HIV at the time.

In 2002, AHF opened an HIV/AIDS clinic in Masaka, Uganda under the program Uganda Cares. In 2004, the organization developed an "HIV Medic Program" in Masaka, a task-shifting training program that was awarded a "Best Practice" designation by the World Health Organization (WHO). By 2022, Uganda Cares had tested over seven million Ugandans, started treatment for more than 112,000 Ugandans, and distributed over 45 million condoms.

In 2004, AHF began working in India. Two years later, the Centre of Excellence ART clinic was opened by AHF India Cares in New Delhi, with AHF becoming the first provider to offer free anti-retroviral therapy (ART) in the area.

In 2021, AHF delivered supplies to Haiti after the country's 7.2 magnitude earthquake.

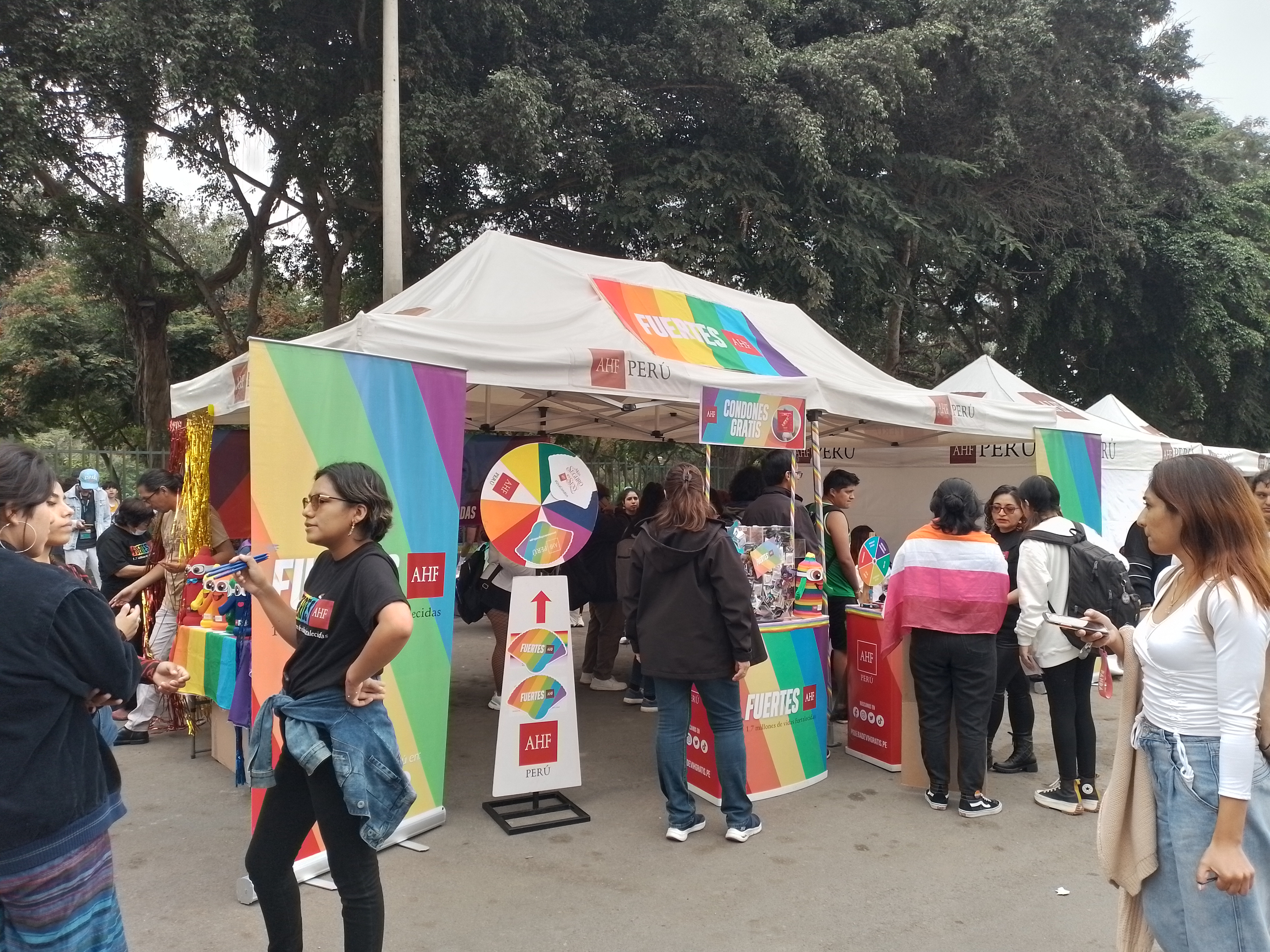
AHF tent in Peru (2023)

In 2023, AHF began a collaboration with the Pan American Health Organization (PAHO) to eliminate HIV/AIDS, tuberculosis, viral hepatitis, monkeypox, and other STIs in Latin America. The partnership set out to implement WHO recommendations through advocacy, including improvement of prevention programs, quality of care, and treatment outcomes.

In 2025, AHF was named an SAP Innovation Award winner for its use of data to provide HIV/AIDS care globally. In November of that year, AHF sent essential supplies to aid Hurricane Melissa victims in Jamaica. The organization deployed more than 40 pallets with critical supplies, such as generators, water, toilet paper, tents, tarps, ready-to-eat food kits, feminine hygiene kits, and water purification tablets.

In January 2026, AHF's Rose Parade float honored the organization's Southern California wildfire and hunger relief efforts. Civil rights and union activist Dolores Huerta rode on AHF's "Food for Health" float in honor of "community collaboration." After the January 2025 wildfires in California, AHF volunteers and partners served more than 75,000 hot meals to wildfire evacuees and first responders through its national "Food for Health" program, which provides nutritious groceries to people in need.

In July 2026, AHF partnered with PAHO to expand early HIV diagnosis in Latin America and the Caribbean. The partnership aims to improve access to testing and reduce preventable AIDS-related deaths.

=== Housing ===
AHF is a proponent of increasing the housing supply for low-income and homeless individuals, and also advocates for rent control. The organization states that its housing platform is based on what it calls the "3 Ps": Protect, preserve, and produce. AHF explains this as addressing gentrification and homelessness by promoting rent control and discouraging evictions; supporting sustainable land-use policies without disrupting neighborhoods; and creating affordable housing through cost-effective new construction and the adaptive reuse of existing buildings.

Weinstein likens the homelessness and housing affordability crises to the "moral outrage of AIDS in the [1980s]," with many homeless youth identifying as LGBTQ. Under his leadership, AHF has sued to prevent the destruction of available housing units by developers who favor luxury housing.

In recognition of the interconnectedness between housing stability and overall health outcomes for individuals living with HIV/AIDS, AIDS Healthcare Foundation established the Healthy Housing Foundation (HHF). HHF is responsible for finding or building affordable housing units in several places across the country, including Los Angeles and Miami-Dade County, where the organization has made a multi-million dollar commitment to house people in need.

In 2017, AHF created a new organization named the Healthy Housing Foundation (HHF) which started acquiring hotels (often single-room occupancy) in the Los Angeles area for conversion to affordable housing units, renting them for about $400 to $600 per month. By 2020, it owned seven such properties totaling 800 units. As of 2022, it owns over a dozen in Los Angeles, Hollywood, and Skid Row neighborhoods, and by 2023 has spend more than $180 million on the purchase and renovation of these properties. AHF has specialized in buying old (and sometimes vacant) hotels and converting them to housing (for a total investment of $110,000 per unit) as a much more cost-effective way to provide housing than the City of Los Angeles, which pays about $500,000 per unit for constructing new affordable housing.

In 2020, tenants in one of AHF's apartment buildings (an almost century-old hotel named The Madison) sued AHF over slum-like conditions. The tenants had reached a settlement with the previous owner for similar problems, and allege that the previous owner defrauded AHF by not disclosing that settlement. AHF has argued against accusations about lingering maintenance problems in the organization's Skid Row residential buildings, blaming city officials for failing to permit planned upgrades. In 2022, the city and public utility paid AHF $100,000 to settle claims that they had delayed needed improvements to an elevator at The Madison.

In December 2023, AHF purchased the Morrison Hotel, made famous by The Doors' 1970 album cover, with plans to convert the building into 111 units of affordable housing. The Doors drummer John Densmore and rock photographer Henry Diltz helped HHF make the announcement, with the hotel becoming the 15th affordable housing property owned and managed by the organization in Los Angeles.

In 2024, AHF received a $10 million grant from the Department of Housing and Urban Development to address tenant organizing for low-income residents, in partnership with Mass Alliance of HUD Tenants. The two organizations work with tenant advocacy organizations to support affordable rental housing.

In August 2025, AHF purchased the 217-room Stadium Hotel in Miami Gardens, Florida, with affordable housing-related adaptive reuse of the property expected.

=== Other activities ===
AIDS Healthcare Foundation actively participates in the World AIDS Day to mobilize communities and promote a greater understanding of the impact of HIV/AIDS worldwide. AHF hosted its 2022 World AIDS Day Concert on Wednesday, November 30th, at the concert hall of The Kennedy Center in Washington, D.C., where multi-Grammy Award-winning vocalists Patti LaBelle and Gladys Knight delivered performances. In December 2023, AHF hosted its World AIDS Day Concert at NRG Arena in Houston, Texas, featuring Janet Jackson, Debbie Allen, and Blair Underwood. Underwood received the organization's Lifetime Achievement Award at the event.

The organization paid $110,000 to Kevin De León for consultancy work in the period after he won election to the Los Angeles City Council, but before he took office. The University of Southern California and an electrical workers' union both also hired De Leon at that time and each organization paid De Leon about the same amount of money that AHF did. Once in office, De León allegedly pressured one of his staff members not to investigate various alleged health and code violations at properties owned by the foundation in De León's district. De León's consulting contract with AHF ended before taking office as a council member. He maintains he showed no favoritism to AHF in addressing tenant complaints, showing that his staff monitored concerns and referred tenants to city enforcement officials. According to Pete Brown, a de León spokesman, his meetings with city officials on AHF's behalf were only intended as briefings.

In 2023, AHF organized a "We The People" national rally in response to bills introduced in state legislatures that the organization claims discriminate against women, immigrants, LGBTQ individuals, and others. More than 4,000 people marched in Fort Lauderdale, Florida in July 2023, including activist organizations and individuals like David Hogg and Debbie Allen. Labor leader and civil rights activist Dolores Huerta also joined the rally.

In May 2025, AHF volunteered at an “Altadena Not For Sale” community event in Altadena, California following the Eaton Fire, providing hot meals, free clothing, and other supplies to local families.

== Safer sex advocacy ==
AHF hosts global events to both commemorate those lost to HIV/AIDS and educate the public about the importance of safer sex with condom use. Each year on December 1st, AHF marks World AIDS Day with a series of international events throughout many of the countries where AHF operates. It is an opportunity to reflect on the progress made in battling HIV/AIDS over the years and be a reminder of the work left to be done amid the 1.7 million new HIV infections every year.

International Condom Day, which is celebrated on February 13th, was established by the AIDS Healthcare Foundation. As a part of its advocacy efforts, AIDS Healthcare Foundation offers free condoms to the public at its International Condom Day (ICD) events and year-round at its pharmacies, healthcare centers, and wellness centers.

International Condom Day is an AHF holiday celebrated on February 13th. It was created to promote safer sex and provide access to condoms and free Rapid Testing. AHF uses World AIDS Day and International Condom Day as fun ways to engage with people, get them tested for HIV, and get them connected to care if they need it.

=== PrEP ===
In 2014, the organization was noted as being unique amongst H.I.V.-prevention groups in advocating against pre-exposure prophylaxis (PrEP), a drug that greatly reduces the risk of contracting H.I.V. Michael Weinstein's past description of PrEP as a "party drug" was unpopular within the anti-AIDS space. According to Weinstein in 2019, "It's a mischaracterization to say that we were opposed to PrEP." He stated that "PrEP would help individuals who were certain not to use condoms." AHF does, however, prescribe PrEP, and as of 2022 is the largest provider of PrEP in the U.S.

== Advocacy for reducing drug prices ==
AHF engages in public advocacy for government programs to address the HIV/AIDS epidemic, including efforts to reduce drug costs. The organization has filed lawsuits against pharmaceutical companies regarding the pricing of HIV treatments, such as tenofovir. In 2006, AHF asked Indian anti-HIV drug manufacturer Cipla to reduce the price of its combination drug Viraday from its launch price of about Rs 62,000 per year. Cipla CEO Y. K. Hamied cited taxes and custom duties on raw materials as reasons for the high price, but agreed to a price cut.

In 2007, AHF filed suit in Los Angeles over Pfizer's direct-to-consumer marketing of Viagra, accusing Pfizer of promoting off-label, recreational use of Viagra, and suggesting a link between Viagra, methamphetamine, and unsafe sex. Pfizer denied AHF's claims, and mentioned that AHF had recently asked Pfizer to fund an educational program about meth. That same year, AHF began purchasing full-page ads in Indian newspapers accusing Cipla of overpricing. According to AHF, a year's worth of Viraday cost Rs 54,000 when sold in India, but only Rs 21,000 when exported to Africa. Some NGOs declined to join AHF in criticizing Cipla's drug prices, citing a potential conflict of interest: Cipla's opposition to the patent application for Viread, a component of Viraday, filed by AHF contributor Gilead Sciences. Gilead denied involvement in AHF's complaint, and an AHF regional chief stated that AHF also opposed Gilead's patent application for Viread.

In 2008, AHF petitioned drug manufacturers including Abbott, Boehringer Ingelheim, Bristol-Myers Squibb, Gilead, GSK, Merck, Pfizer, Roche and Tibotec to freeze the price of their HIV drugs in the U.S., stating that as a result of regular drug price increases "HIV/AIDS assistance programs will essentially be flat funded and unable to provide access to additional people in need of lifesaving drugs."

In 2013, AHF filed a lawsuit in California against GSK alleging that the company "... failed to fully satisfy its obligations with respect to discounts for drugs it sold to AIDS Healthcare Foundation over a period of many years," under the 340B Drug Pricing Program, a federal drug discount program designed to stretch scarce federal resources as far as possible for community healthcare providers such as AHF. The organization is a participant in the 340B Program, claiming it improves the "clinical outcomes of vulnerable Americans" while "cost[ing] the American taxpayer nothing." AHF has criticized pharmaceutical companies for opposing the 340B Program, saying it is critical for access to healthcare in rural areas.

In January 2025, AHF won a $10 million anti-trust ruling against Prime Therapeutics, with an arbitrator determining that the company violated federal and state anti-trust laws against AHF and independent pharmacies. Prime was found to have engaged in horizontal price-fixing with Cigna’s pharmacy benefit manager, Express Scripts.

In January 2026, AHF sued the state of Florida after its Department of Health changed the eligibility requirements for the AIDS Drug Assistance Program (ADAP), the state's prescription medication assistance program for people living with HIV/AIDS. The move jeopardized ADAP access for thousands of Floridians. In May 2026, Florida lawmakers reached a deal to reverse the changes and restore funding for the program. Esteban Wood, AHF director of advocacy and legislative affairs, said, "Florida’s health department walked away from people living with HIV. Lawmakers brought them back."

== Legal activism ==
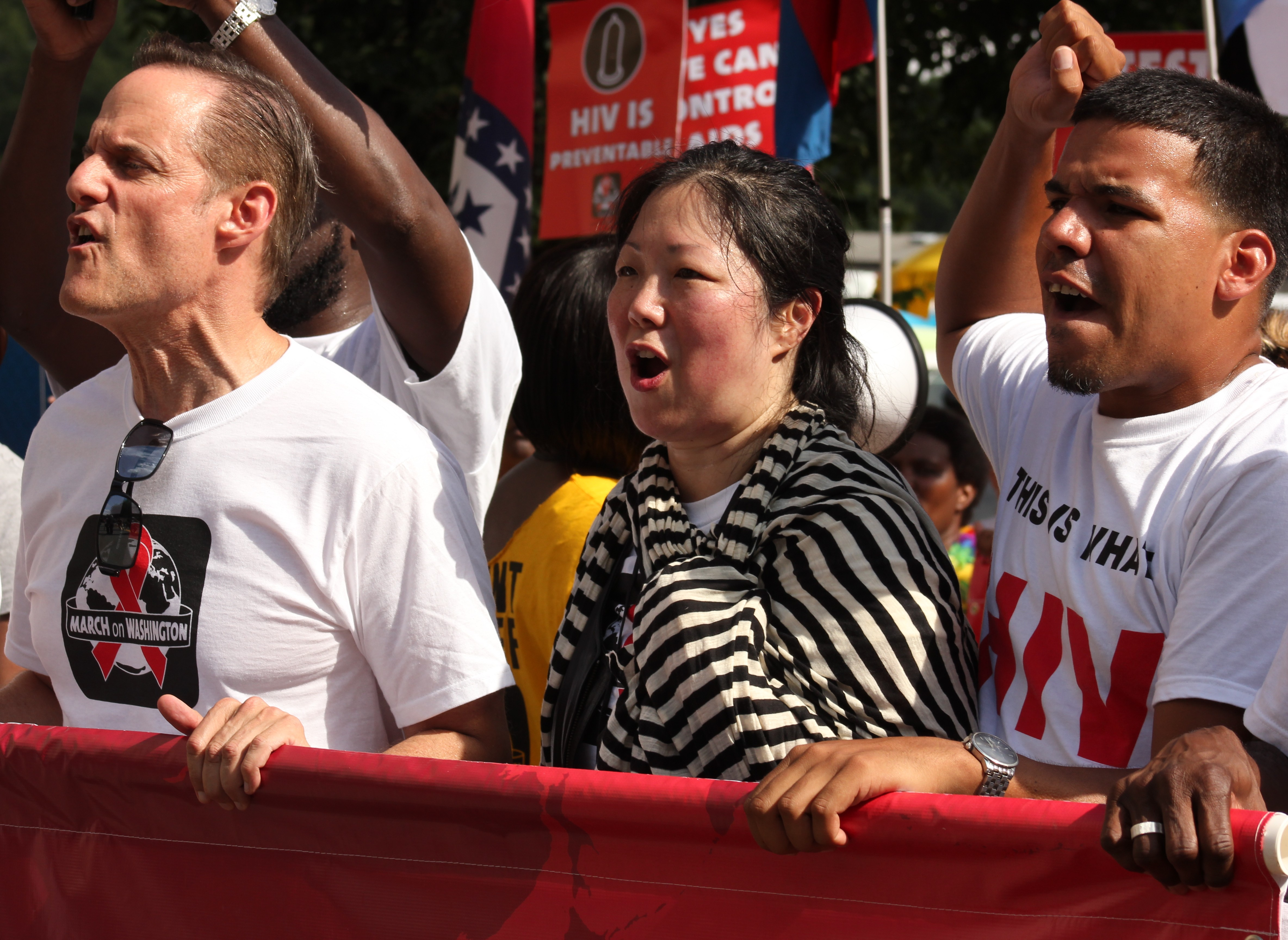
"Keep the Promise" AIDS march in Washington, D.C.

In 1999, AHF filed a lawsuit against the City of Los Angeles over the mismanagement of AIDS Housing Funds. Following a state legislator's audit, the Los Angeles City Controller revealed that more than $17 million in federal funds for people with AIDS went unspent as an AIDS homeless crisis raged in Los Angeles.

=== Condom laws litigation in Los Angeles and Las Vegas ===
In 2004, Darren James and three other adult film actors tested positive for HIV. In response to the outbreak, AHF began lobbying in favor of laws requiring condom use by male actors during sex scenes in adult films.

In 2010, AHF unsuccessfully sued the Los Angeles County government to compel its health department to mandate condom use in adult film productions.

In 2012, AHF supported a Los Angeles city ordinance requiring condoms in certain adult films. Later the same year, the organization spent US$1,654,681 funding the successful campaign to pass Measure B, a ballot initiative that expanded the condom requirement countywide.

AHF again sued the Los Angeles County government, alleging that an August 2012 audit conducted by the county was an illegal retaliation for AHF's support for Measure B. In 2013, AHF began collecting signatures for a ballot measure to create a Los Angeles city health department that would take over part of the county health department's jurisdiction. The City of Los Angeles and County of Los Angeles oppose the measure, and the city has filed a lawsuit seeking to invalidate the measure.

In August 2014, the AIDS Healthcare Foundation filed a formal complaint with Nevada OSHA, against Cybernet Entertainment LLC, which does business as Kink.com and related spin-offs. The complaint alleges the California porn company did not require its actors to use condoms during an adult film shoot in Las Vegas.

=== 2013 Los Angeles lawsuit ===
In 2013, AHF found itself entangled in dual lawsuits when AHF allegedly attempted to use its clout to force the City of Los Angeles to develop health services independent from the county. Health officials in affected departments filed responsive suits, arguing massive wastes would result in a transition or duplication of services.

=== 2014 lawsuits ===
In 2014, the AIDS Healthcare Foundation filed suit against the City of San Francisco. AHF claimed that city restrictions on chain stores targeted them unfairly when the organization attempted to open a retail store.

In 2014, the AIDS Healthcare Foundation filed suit against the County of Dallas. AHF claimed that the County did not give the agency a fair chance to bid for federal AIDS funding.

In 2014, AHF was audited by Los Angeles county and billed $1.7 million for duplicated services. AHF filed suit, arguing that it was targeted on the basis of its political actions in the 2013 lawsuit. The lawsuit filed by AHF was thrown out by a judge. The billing case was dismissed, finding AHF had not billed the county for $6 million in allowable services with neither the foundation nor the county having to repay funds.

=== 2015 Broward County Court ===
In 2015, a whistleblower lawsuit was filed by three former AHF managers. The employees allege AHF engaged and even documented kickback processes for positive HIV test results for social workers. AHF ultimately won the case.

=== 2016 East Baton Rouge lawsuit ===
In 2016, the AIDS healthcare foundation filed suit against East Baton Rouge Parish in Louisiana, claiming it was discriminated against in the awarding of healthcare contracts. The suit specifically targeted funds given to longstanding local AIDS service organizations such as HIV/AIDS Alliance for Region Two, Family Service of Greater Baton Rouge, and others. The suit was settled with funding left unchanged.

=== 2016 Los Angeles Palladium Development lawsuit ===
The AIDS Healthcare Foundation (AHF) filed suit against the City of Los Angeles, alleging that the city violated laws and the city charter when it approved the development of two residential towers that are expected to be up to 30 stories tall. The City Council changed existing zoning and height limitations to allow the development, which would be next to AHF's Hollywood headquarters. A spokesperson for the development accused Michael Weinstein of filing the suit to maintain the view from his office, but Weinstein countered that opposing "luxury housing" development is part of AHF's mission. In 2019, the California Supreme Court refused to hear the case, leaving in place a lower court decision against the foundation.

=== 2019 CVS lawsuit ===
In 2019, AHF filed a lawsuit with the American Arbitration Association against Caremark LLC, a CVS subsidiary, over unfair reimbursement practices. CVS was eventually ordered to compensate AHF $23 million.

=== 2022 L.A. City Council Housing Element dispute ===
In 2022, the AHF sued to block Los Angeles's Housing Element, which is a new strategy by the L.A. City Council to increase housing supply in L.A. with a goal of producing 500,000 new housing units by 2030, with 200,000 of those being affordable units. AHF argued that city officials did not properly assess the environmental impacts of their strategy.

== Ballot initiatives ==
=== Condom use in adult films ===
==== 2012 Los Angeles County Measure B "County of Los Angeles Safer Sex In the Adult Film Industry Act" – succeeded ====
AHF spent $2.3 million sponsoring an initiative that requires the use of condoms in all vaginal and anal sex scenes in pornography productions filmed in Los Angeles County, California. It passed 57% – 43%.

==== 2016 California Proposition 60 "Adult Film Condom Requirements" – failed ====
AHF spent $5.0 million (almost ten times what the total opposition spent) as the only financial backer of a statewide initiative that would have allowed Cal/OSHA to prosecute an enforcement action any time a condom is not visible in a pornographic film. It failed, 54% to 46%.

=== Drug pricing ===
==== 2013 San Francisco Proposition D – succeeded ====
In 2013 AHF sponsored Proposition D in the City of San Francisco, which required the city to negotiate directly with drug manufacturers and set a city policy to request that state and federal lawmakers create laws that would reduce drug prices. It passed 80% – 20%.

==== 2016 California Proposition 61 "California Drug Price Relief Act" – failed ====
AHF spent $19.5 million as the almost sole supporter of the California Drug Price Relief Act, (the opposition spent $110 million, making this the most expensive ballot measure to date across California and the United States) a statewide 2016 ballot initiative that would have revised California law to require state programs to pay no more for prescription medications than the prices negotiated by the United States Department of Veterans Affairs (notwithstanding any other provision of law and insofar as permissible under federal law), while exempting managed care programs funded through Medi-Cal. It failed by a 6% margin.

==== 2017 Ohio Issue 2 "Ohio Drug Price Relief Act" – failed ====
AHF spent $18 million as the almost exclusive sponsor of the Ohio Drug Price Relief Act (the opposition raised $59 million). According to the Ohio petition language, "The Ohio Drug Price Relief Act would ... require that notwithstanding any other provision of law and in so far as permissible under federal law, the State of Ohio shall not enter into any agreement for the purchase of prescription drugs or agree to pay, directly or indirectly, for prescription drugs, including where the state is the ultimate payer, unless the net cost is the same or less than the lowest price paid for the same drug by the U. S. Department of Veterans Affairs." The initiative failed, 79% – 21%.

=== Housing ===
==== 2017 Los Angeles city Measure S "Neighborhood Integrity Initiative" – failed ====
In 2016, the foundation sponsored and provided more than 95% of the funding ($5.5 million) for an anti-development ballot initiative, Measure S, which was rejected with 70.4% voting against. Real estate developers and others spent over $8 million opposing Measure S. This initiative would have imposed a two-year moratorium on spot zoning as well as developments requiring height and density variances and other changes that would, it claimed, prevent the city from gentrifying and growing too fast. "As we work to house patients in L.A., City Hall focuses on approving $3,500 apartments that sit empty," Weinstein wrote in a Los Angeles Times op-ed. Opponents, who included many advocacy groups for the homeless as well as the city's business community, building trades unions, and developers, said that while the measure addressed some real problems, it went too far and would have not only prevented the construction of new affordable housing but made the city's overall quality of life worse by aggravating an existing housing shortage. They questioned whether the money spent by the AIDS Healthcare Foundation to get the initiative on the ballot was related to the foundation's mission.

In an interview with The Advocate in 2016, regarding Measure S, Weinstein stated: "Why isn't there development in South L.A.? Why isn't there development in Boyle Heights? Why concentrate all this development in Hollywood? You have a [transit line] in the Valley and a [transit line] in South L.A." Dana Cuff, an urban planning professor at the University of California, Los Angeles stated that Weinstein's opposition to the Palladium Residences (behind the Hollywood Palladium) and other upscale developments "is not understandable" and "a misuse of [AHF's] funds," saying the organization "couldn't possibly be concerned about affordable housing" by stopping the Palladium towers. Some opponents have characterized Weinstein as a NIMBY who criticizes such development because it would block the views from his office building, rather than because he cares about the plight of low-income renters (Weinstein denies ever discussing his office views). Weinstein argues that upscale developments like the Palladium towers command exorbitant rents that price out working-class people. He said, "You can't call people like me NIMBYs for being against luxury housing. If we were against a school, a hospital, a homeless shelter, or an affordable housing project, you can call us NIMBYs all day long."

==== 2018 California Proposition 10 "Repeal of Costa-Hawkins Rental Housing Act" – failed ====
AHF contributed $22.5 million to the campaign for Proposition 10, a ballot initiative which sought to repeal the 1995 Costa-Hawkins Act. The measure would have allowed local governments to adopt rent control on any kind of building. Costa-Hawkins is a state law which disallows local governments (cities and counties) from enacting rent control on buildings constructed after 1995, all single-family homes (regardless of construction date), and disallows laws that keep a property under rent control when tenants change (vacancy control). The proposition failed, 59% to 41%.

==== 2020 California Proposition 21 "Expands Local Governments' Authority to Enact Rent Control on Residential Property" – failed ====
In 2019, the California legislature passed and the governor signed AB 1482, which created a statewide rent cap for the next 10 years. The Tenant Protection Act of 2019 caps annual rent increases at 5% plus regional inflation, pegged to the rental rate as of March 2019. The new law does not apply to buildings built within the prior 15 years, or to single-family homes (unless owned by corporations or institutional investors) and retains "vacancy decontrol," meaning that rents can increase to market rate between tenants.

In 2020, Michael Weinstein, AHF's founder, sponsored and financed a second ballot initiative to allow more rent control, because he felt that AB 1482 (above) did not provide enough tenant protections, such as limiting rent increases between tenants.

AHF spent $40 million (99.8% of the supporters' funding) in support of Proposition 21 (the opposition spent $85 million). It appeared on the ballot on November 3rd, 2020 and would have allowed local governments to establish rent control on residential properties that have been occupied for over 15 years. It would also have allowed landlords who own no more than two homes to exempt themselves from such policies, and would also have capped rent increases between tenancies at 15% over three years (vacancy control). Proposition 21 was rejected by 60% of California voters, like Proposition 10 (above) before it.

==== 2024 California Proposition 33 "Justice for Renters Act" – failed ====
AHF sponsored and has contributed more than $47 million to the "Justice for Renters Act," a 2024 ballot measure in California (Proposition 33) that would repeal the Costa–Hawkins Rental Housing Act and allow localities to enact rent control on single-family homes, apartments built after 1995, and to control rent increases between tenancies, all currently banned by Costa-Hawkins. California currently limits rent increases to 10 percent a year for tenants living in apartments built before 1995; Proposition 33 would allow cities and counties to create local rent control laws for any form of housing no matter when it was constructed. This would include rent increase caps on newer buildings not covered under Costa-Hawkins.

Proposition 33 is supported by labor and tenant organizations such as Unite Here Local 11, the California Nurses Association, the California Alliance for Retired Americans, the Coalition for Economic Survival, Consumer Watchdog, Tenants Together, and Veterans' Voices. Organizations like the California Democratic Party, the California Working Families Party, and the ACLU of California have also endorsed the measure, in addition to Los Angeles County and San Francisco County.

In April 2024, Michael Weinstein attended a two-day strategy session with other housing activists in Los Angeles, including Los Angeles Mayor Karen Bass, Sen. Bernie Sanders, and Rep. Ro Khanna. During the session, Weinstein claimed the Justice for Renters campaign is a "battle for the poor and working-class people" who find housing in California unaffordable. He stated that the primary reason for his and AHF's involvement in affordable housing is that "housing is the largest predeterminant of health," calling housing a "human right." AHF also refers to Proposition 33 as a "social justice issue" for unhoused and low-income communities.

Proposition 33 is opposed by California state senator Toni Atkins, San Diego mayor Todd Gloria, and other local leaders. Opponents state that it will reduce housing construction, thereby worsening California's housing shortage.

Proposition 33 was defeated 62 to 38 percent. Weinstein blamed the defeat on California Governor Gavin Newsom, claiming the initiative was more popular before the governor voiced his opposition. In Weinstein's words: "Big real estate gave [Newsom] millions over the years, and they called in their chits."

==== 2024 California Proposition 34 "Restricts Spending of Prescription Drug Revenues By Certain Health Care Providers" – succeeded ====
In an effort to prevent AHF from continuing to use its profits (money that AHF receives under the 340B Drug Pricing Program intended for healthcare providers to expand their services to disadvantaged groups) to fund the above-mentioned three rent-control initiatives, the California Apartment Association (CAA) sponsored and funded Proposition 34. This law would require certain California healthcare providers to spend 98% of that revenue on direct patient care. News reports have said the only organization seemingly affected by the law is AHF. The proposition passed, 51% to 49%.

== See also ==
- Adult Industry Medical Health Care Foundation
- Performer Availability Screening Services
