= Coalition for Economic Survival =

Non-profit organization in California, US

- Type: 501(c)(4) charitable organization
- Purpose: Tenant rights Low-income housing
- Location: (United States) Greater Los Angeles
- Region served: California
- Method: Lobbying
- Website: www.cesinaction.org

The Coalition for Economic Survival (CES) is a grassroots, non-profit community organization. CES works in the greater Los Angeles area to influence policy makers to improve the lives of low and moderate income people.

== History ==
CES' first organizing campaigns focused on transportation, utilities, affordable food and employment issues. These campaigns were a success because they stopped an increase in bus fare and utility rate increases and lowered milk prices.

In the 1970s, when housing rental costs went up, CES began to focus on tenant's rights, rent control and the preservation of affordable housing for everyone.

=== Accomplishments ===
CES' other self-proclaimed accomplishments include:

- Rent control laws in Los Angeles and West Hollywood.
- Expanding into West Hollywood and electing CES members to the West Hollywood City Council.
- Assisting 4 low income tenant associations to purchase their Department of Housing and Urban Development (HUD)-subsidized housing complexes and preserve them as permanent affordable housing.
- Securing substantial increases to tenant relocation assistance amounts paid to evicted renters.
- Campaign to defeat Proposition 98, which sought to end rent control, and winning Proposition 99, which provided for homeowners protections against eminent domain in June 2008.
- Winning just compensation for displaced tenants and replacement affordable housing caused through government projects such as the Los Angeles Convention Center expansion and Los Angeles Unified School District (LAUSD) school construction plans.
- Lobbying for laws to provide tenants' rights and preserve affordable housing on the federal, state and local levels.
- In 1989, pressured the LA City Council to create the Systematic Code Enforcement Program, a program to inspect the City's over 700,000 rental units for electrical, plumbing and structural housing code violations.

== Issues and activities ==
CES organizes low and moderate income tenants of privately owned rental housing units, including both federally subsidized and non-subsidized units, who are at face slum conditions, including lead hazards, proposed demolitions or renovations, illegal evictions and owners' desires to opt out of federally subsidized rental housing programs. With the rise in property prices in Southern California, the supply and quality of housing that is affordable less common. There is also a significant increase in landlord and property developer attempts to demolish affordable housing to build luxury units or to substantially renovate existing affordable housing in order to get higher-paying tenants.

In this regard, CES educates, trains and supports tenants to bring together tenants in threatened affordable housing together with tenants in slum and HUD housing to create a larger lobby in preservation of healthy, safe and decent affordable housing. CES also organizes tenants to stop unjust evictions and rent increases, and force landlords to make repairs where needed.

Some of the programs are:

- Subsidized Housing Preservation—providing outreach, training and organizing assistance to tenants living in HUD subsidized housing.
- Healthy Homes Campaign—advocates against housing conditions that create environmental health hazards include vermin infestation, exposure to lead dust, damp living quarters, inadequate hot and cold running water, and inadequate heating. Related health problems include insect bites, rat bites (involving deep puncture which quickly become infected), rashes, nausea, cramps, respiratory tract problems, headaches, coma and seizures, severe conjunctivitis, vomiting, fever, neuralgia and muscle pain as well as kidney and liver problems.
- Tenants' Rights & Anti-Displacement Efforts—advocated for new laws on the local and state level to expand tenants' rights and prevent the loss of existing affordable housing due to demolition, major rehabilitation and vacancy decontrol.
- Stronger Housing Code Enforcement—contracted by the city to provide outreach to tenants living in slum buildings which are subject to the Rent Escrow Account Program (REAP), Lead Paint Prevention Program, Utility Maintenance Program and Urgent Repair Program. Adjudicate where the landlord has not paid water or electricity bills and puts service is at risk, or refuses to make repairs to conditions which are life-threatening and the city steps in to make sure repairs are made. Under the contract, CES conducts outreach to tenants to educate them on their rights, encourage them to participate in these programs and verify that the repairs are made.
- Making Your Home A Better Place To Live—citing property for Housing Code violations
- Tenant Counseling—sponsors a twice-weekly Tenants' Rights Legal Clinic for individual counseling and advice from volunteer attorneys and counselors.
