= 2020 California Proposition 21 =

Ballot measure on rent control

Proposition 21
- November 3, 2020
- Expands Local Governments’ Authority to Enact Rent Control on Residential Property. Initiative Statute

Results
Choice	Votes	%
Yes	6,771,298	40.15%
No	10,095,206	59.85%
Valid votes	16,866,504	94.83%
Invalid or blank votes	918,647	5.17%
Total votes	17,785,151	100.00%
Registered voters/turnout	22,047,448	80.67%
County results
For
50%–60%
Against
80%–90%
70%–80%
60%–70%
50%–60%

Proposition 21, an initiative statute for local rent control officially called the Expands Local Governments’ Authority to Enact Rent Control on Residential Property, was a California ballot proposition that appeared on the ballot for the general election on November 3, 2020 and was rejected. If approved, it would allow local governments to establish rent control on residential properties that have been occupied for over 15 years. It would also allow landlords who own no more than two homes to exempt themselves from such policies. This would essentially repeal some of the provisions in the 1995 Costa–Hawkins Rental Housing Act. Proposition 21 was rejected by 60% of California voters, just like Proposition 10 was before it.

In the 2018 California election, a measure to completely repeal the Costa-Hawkins Rental Housing Act, known as Proposition 10, was on the ballot, but failed to pass, as nearly 60% of voters rejected that measure. The same activists who sponsored Proposition 10, who had links to the AIDS Healthcare Foundation, tried again with another ballot measure to reform the Costa-Hawkins Act, due to their failure to completely repeal it in 2018. The AIDS Healthcare Foundation spent $40 million in support of Proposition 21 and the opposition spent $85 million.

As of 2017, over seventeen million Californians were renters. This totals about 45% of the state's population. Further, California boasts the highest rental costs in the nation. Per the Rose Institute of State and Local Government, "the state’s [California's] median rent is $1,447, whereas the United States’ is $1,012."

== Polls ==
Poll source	Date(s) administered	Sample size (Note: Key: A – all adults RV – registered voters LV – likely voters V – unclear)	Margin of error	For Proposition 21	Against Proposition 21	Undecided
UC Berkeley Institute of Governmental Studies	October 16–21, 2020	5,352 (LV)	–	37%	48%	15%
Ipsos/Spectrum News	October 7–15, 2020	1,400 (A)	± 3%	43%	36%	21%
SurveyUSA	September 26–28, 2020	588 (LV)	± 5.4%	46%	27%	27%
UC Berkeley/LA Times	September 9–15, 2020	5,942 (LV)	± 2%	37%	37%	26%

== Results ==
Choice	Votes	%
For	6,771,298	40.15
Against	10,095,206	59.85
Blank votes	918,647	-
Total	17,785,151	100
Registered voters/turnout	22,047,448	80.67
Source: elections.cdn.sos.ca.gov

California voters rejected Proposition 21 by a margin of 59.9% to 40.1%. This is the second time that California voters have rejected a rent-control measure at the ballot box. In 2018, California voters rejected Proposition 10, a similar rent-control measure, by a similar margin of 59% to 41%.

This loss came as Californians experienced record high rents in September 2020, and renters feared COVID-19 related evictions. Supporters of Proposition 21 expressed regret over the defeat. René Moya, campaign director for Yes on 21, said, “We are disappointed, although not completely surprised, that Prop. 21 fell short at the ballot box tonight.”
