= 2014 United States ballot measures =

List of election questions

- May 6 to November 4, 2014

Part of the 2014 United States elections

The following is a list of ballot measures, whether initiated by legislators or citizens, which were certified to appear on various states' ballots during the 2014 United States elections.

== By state ==
=== Alabama ===
| Origin | Status | Measure | Description (Result of a "yes" vote) | Date | Yes | No |
|---|---|---|---|---|---|---|
| Legislature | Approved | Alabama Cotton Producer Assessment Refund Amendment, Amendment 1 | End the assessment refund to cotton producers who do not participate in the assessment program for the cotton checkoff, as well as enabled a second act: Senate Bill 256; allowing any authorized commission of cotton producers to petition the State Board of Agriculture and Industries to conduct a referendum on the collection of assessments without any provision for refunds to producers who do not want to participate in the program. | Jul 15 | 158,356; 67.08% | 77,725; 32.92% |
| Legislature | Approved | Alabama Foreign Laws in Court, Amendment 1 | Prevent Alabama courts from recognizing foreign and other laws that violate either Alabama's public policy or the rights of the state's citizens. | Nov 4 | 696,141; 72.33% | 266,272; 27.67% |
| Legislature | Approved | Alabama Capital Improvement Trust Fund, Amendment 2 | Increase the total amount of bonding authority granted under Amendment 666 to the Constitution of Alabama of 1901; provide for additional payments from the Alabama Trust Fund to fund any bond issued; provide for competitive bidding of the bonds; require the Bond Commission to contract with businesses or individuals which reflect the racial and ethnic diversity of the state; and provide for the use of the proceeds for plans, construction and maintenance of Alabama National Guard armories. | Nov 4 | 479,026; 50.48% | 469,998; 49.52% |
| Legislature | Approved | Alabama Right to Bear Arms, Amendment 3 | Amend the Alabama Constitution to explicitly "provide that every citizen has a fundamental right to bear arms and that any restriction on this right would be subject to strict scrutiny" and "provide that no international treaty or law shall prohibit, limit or otherwise interfere with a citizen's fundamental right to bear arms." | Nov 4 | 736,462; 72.50% | 279,397; 27.50% |
| Legislature | Approved | Alabama Board of Education Expenditure Increase, Amendment 4 | Increase the requirement to a two-thirds vote (over 66.66 percent), rather than a simple majority (over 50 percent), of the Alabama Legislature in order to pass a law that would require local boards of education to cumulatively spend over $50,000 in local funds without providing the funds to pay for the increased expense. Additionally, continue to provide that a majority vote would be required for unfunded mandates that address the compensation, benefits, or due process rights of any employee of a board of education. | Nov 4 | 535,308; 56.24% | 416,460; 43.76% |
| Legislature | Approved | Alabama Right to Hunt and Fish, Amendment 5 | Clarify that the people have the right to hunt, fish, and harvest wildlife subject to reasonable regulations that promote conservation and management of fish and wildlife and preserve the future of hunting and fishing. | Nov 4 | 789,777; 79.84% | 199,483; 20.16% |

=== Alaska ===
| Origin | Status | Measure | Description (Result of a "yes" vote) | Date | Yes | No |
|---|---|---|---|---|---|---|
| Veto Referendum | Failed | Alaska Oil Tax Cuts Veto Referendum, Ballot Measure 1 | Repeal Senate Bill 21, also known as the Oil and Gas Production Tax and the More Alaska Production Act (MAPA), which granted tax breaks to oil companies. | Aug 19 | 89,608; 47.30% | 99,855; 52.70% |
| Citizens | Approved | Alaska Marijuana Legalization, Ballot Measure 2 | Allow people age 21 and older to possess up to one ounce of marijuana and up to six plants, alongside legalizing the manufacture, sale and possession of marijuana paraphernalia. | Nov 4 | 149,021; 53.23% | 130,924; 46.77% |
| Citizens | Approved | Alaska Minimum Wage Increase, Ballot Measure 3 | Increase the state's minimum wage from $7.75 per hour to $8.75 beginning January 1, 2015. It increased again on January 1, 2016, to $9.75 per hour. From that point on, the minimum wage is slated to be adjusted based on inflation, or to remain $1 higher than the federal minimum wage, whichever amount is greater. | Nov 4 | 194,654; 69.35% | 86,040; 30.65% |
| Citizens | Approved | Alaska Bristol Bay Mining Ban, Ballot Measure 4 | Give the legislature the power to prohibit mining projects in Bristol Bay if legislators determine the activity to be harmful to wild salmon within the fisheries reserve. | Nov 4 | 180,490; 65.94% | 93,212; 34.06% |

=== Arizona ===
| Origin | Status | Measure | Description (Result of a "yes" vote) | Date | Yes | No |
|---|---|---|---|---|---|---|
| Legislature | Approved | Arizona Proposition 122, Rejection of Unconstitutional Federal Actions Amendment | Permit the state to restrict all state and local government entities from enforcing or cooperating with a federal action that is deemed to be inconsistent with the U.S. Constitution. | Nov 4 | 707,451; 51.24% | 673,337; 48.76% |
| Legislature | Approved | Arizona Proposition 303, Medical Product Authorization for Terminally Ill Patients Initiative | Permit drug and medical device manufacturers to make products available to terminally ill patients that have completed phase one of a clinical trial but have not yet been approved by the U.S. Food and Drug Administration. | Nov 4 | 1,111,850; 78.47% | 304,971; 21.53% |
| State Commission | Failed | Arizona Proposition 304, Salary Increase for State Legislators Measure | Increase legislative salaries from $24,000 per year to $35,000. | Nov 4 | 457,216; 32.11% | 966,605; 67.89% |

=== Arkansas ===
| Origin | Status | Measure | Description (Result of a "yes" vote) | Date | Yes | No |
|---|---|---|---|---|---|---|
| Legislature | Approved | Arkansas Legislative Approval of State Agency Rules Amendment, Issue 1 | Require legislative review and approval of all changes to state agencies' administrative rules. | Nov 4 | 469,431; 59.06% | 325,396; 40.94% |
| Legislature | Approved | Arkansas Ballot Measure Signature Requirements Amendment, Issue 2 | Require ballot issue groups to collect at least 75 percent of the valid signatures required in order to receive additional time to gather extra signatures once the petition has been turned in to the Secretary of State. | Nov 4 | 425,709; 53.31% | 372,784; 46.69% |
| Legislature | Approved | Arkansas Elected Officials Ethics, Transparency and Financial Reform Amendment, Issue 3 | Permit legislators to serve a total of 16 years in the House or Senate - thereby doubling and more than doubling the amount of time a lawmaker can stay in the Arkansas Senate and House, respectively - and established limits on lobbying efforts by former legislators, as well as campaign donations and gifts from lobbyists. | Nov 4 | 428,206; 52.43% | 388,459; 47.57% |
| Citizens | Failed | Arkansas Alcoholic Beverage Initiative, Issue 4 | Legalize the sale, manufacture and transportation of alcohol or "intoxicating liquors" statewide. | Nov 4 | 354,446; 42.59% | 477,877; 57.41% |
| Citizens | Approved | Arkansas Minimum Wage Initiative, Issue 5 | Increase the state’s minimum wage from $6.25 to $7.50 per hour on January 1, 2015; to $8 on January 1, 2016; and to $8.50 per hour on January 1, 2017. | Nov 4 | 548,789; 65.94% | 283,524; 34.06% |

=== California ===
| Origin | Status | Measure | Description (Result of a "yes" vote) | Date | Yes | No |
|---|---|---|---|---|---|---|
| Bond Issue | Approved | California Proposition 41, Veterans Housing and Homeless Prevention Bond | Authorize the state to issue $600 million in bonds for housing facilities for veterans and their families and appropriating money from the General Fund to pay off the bond debt. | Jun 3 | 2,708,933; 65.39% | 1,434,060; 34.61% |
| Legislature | Approved | California Proposition 42, Public Access to Local Government Records Amendment | Require all local governments and agencies to comply with the California Public Records Act (CPRA) and the Ralph M. Brown Act (Brown Act) and with any subsequent changes to the acts, thus guaranteeing a person's right to inspect public records and attend public meetings. | Jun 3 | 2,467,357; 61.84% | 1,522,406; 38.16% |
| Bond Issue | Approved | California Proposition 1, Water Bond | Issue $7.12 billion in bonds for water supply infrastructure projects, including water storage, dams, and reservoirs, drinking water quality improvements, and water recycling and flood management. | Nov 4 | 4,771,350; 67.13% | 2,336,676; 32.87% |
| Legislature | Approved | California Proposition 2, Changes to State Budget Stabilization Fund Amendment | Require 1.5% of general fund revenues and an amount equal to revenues derived from capital gains-related taxes in situations where such tax revenues are in excess of 8% of general fund revenues to be deposited into the Budget Stabilization Fund (BSA); require from the 2015-2016 fiscal year until the 2029-2030 fiscal year, 50% of the revenues that would have otherwise been deposited into the BSA to be used to pay for outstanding fiscal obligations; permit the legislature to suspend or reduce deposits to the BSA and upon the governor declaring a budget emergency; and creating the Public School System Stabilization Account (PSSSA). | Nov 4 | 4,831,045; 69.12% | 2,158,004; 30.88% |
| Citizens | Failed | California Proposition 45, Required Public Notice for Health Insurance Rate Changes Initiative | Require changes to health insurance rates to be approved by the California Insurance Commissioner before taking effect and requiring public notice and disclosure of such changes. | Nov 4 | 2,917,882; 41.08% | 4,184,416; 58.92% |
| Citizens | Failed | California Proposition 46, Medical Malpractice Lawsuit Cap and Drug Testing of Doctors Initiative | Increase the state's cap on non-economic damages that can be assessed in medical malpractice lawsuits to over $1 million from the existing cap of $250,000 and requiring positive drug and alcohol tests of doctors to be reported to the California Medical Board. | Nov 4 | 2,376,817; 33.24% | 4,774,364; 66.76% |
| Citizens | Approved | California Proposition 47, Reduced Penalties for Some Crimes Initiative | Classify certain crimes as misdemeanors instead of felonies unless the defendant had prior convictions for murder, rape, certain sex offenses or certain gun crimes; allow resentencing for those currently serving a prison sentence for any of the offenses that the initiative reduced to misdemeanors; and creating the Safe Neighborhoods and Schools Fund to receive appropriations based on savings from the initiative. | Nov 4 | 4,238,156; 59.61% | 2,871,943; 40.39% |
| Veto Referendum | Failed | California Proposition 48, American Indian Gaming Compacts Referendum | Uphold Assembly Bill 277, which ratified two gaming compacts between California and, respectively, the North Fork Rancheria of Mono Indians, and the Wiyot Tribe. | Nov 4 | 2,702,157; 39.04% | 4,219,881; 60.96% |

=== Colorado ===
| Origin | Status | Measure | Description (Result of a "yes" vote) | Date | Yes | No |
|---|---|---|---|---|---|---|
| Citizens | Failed | Colorado Amendment 67, Definition of Person Initiative | Provide that "the words 'person' and 'child' in the Colorado Criminal Code and the Colorado Wrongful Death Act must include unborn human beings." | Nov 4 | 702,544; 35.13% | 1,297,299; 64.87% |
| Citizens | Failed | Colorado Horse Racetrack Limited Gaming Proceeds for K-12 Education, Amendment 68 | Establish a kindergarten through twelfth grade education fund to provide additional revenue to address local educational needs financed through additional revenues generated by the expansion of limited gaming at horse racetracks in the counties of Arapahoe, Mesa and Pueblo. Permitting the use of at least slot machines, card games, roulette and craps at such locations. | Nov 4 | 597,239; 29.36% | 1,419,095; 70.38% |
| Citizens | Approved | Colorado School Board Open Meetings, Proposition 104 | Require meetings of the members of a board of education of a school district during which collective bargaining negotiations or employment contract negotiations take place to be open to the public. | Nov 4 | 1,364,747; 70.09% | 582,473; 29.91% |
| Citizens | Failed | Colorado Mandatory Labeling of GMOs Initiative, Proposition 105 | Require any "prepackaged, processed food or raw agricultural commodity that has been produced using genetic modification" to include the label: "Produced with genetic engineering." | Nov 4 | 694,738; 34.53% | 1,317,288; 65.47% |

=== Connecticut ===
| Origin | Status | Measure | Description (Result of a "yes" vote) | Date | Yes | No |
|---|---|---|---|---|---|---|
| Legislature | Failed | Connecticut Question 1, Expanded Early and Absentee Voting Amendment | Allow the state legislature to expand early voting in the state by permitting the elimination of restrictions on early voting and allow residents greater access to absentee ballots. | Nov 4 | 453,070; 47.97% | 491,447; 52.03% |

=== Florida ===
| Origin | Status | Measure | Description (Result of a "yes" vote) | Date | Yes | No |
|---|---|---|---|---|---|---|
| Citizens | Approved | Florida Amendment 1, Water and Land Conservation Initiative | Dedicate 33% of the net reveneue from the existing excise tax on documents to the Land Acquisition Trust Fund to improve conservation easements, wildlife management areas, wetlands, forests, fish and wildlife habitats, beaches and shores, recreational trails and parks, among other projects. | Nov 4 | 4,238,739; 74.96% (Note: In order for a ballot measure intended to amend the Florida Constitution to pass it must first meet a 60% minimum voter threshold.) | 1,415,924; 25.04% |
| Citizens | Failed | Florida Amendment 2, Right to Medical Marijuana Initiative | Legalize medical marijuana; guaranteeing that the medical use of marijuana by a qualifying patient or personal caregiver would not be subject to criminal or civil liability or sanctions under state law, that a licensed physician would not be subject to criminal or civil liability or sanctions for issuing medical marijuana to a person diagnosed with a "debilitating medical condition" under state law, and that registered medical marijuana treatment centers would not be subject to criminal or civil liability or sanctions under state law. The measure additionally defined a "debilitating medical condition" as cancer, multiple sclerosis, glaucoma, hepatitis C, HIV, AIDS, ALS, Crohn's disease, Parkinson's disease "or other conditions for which a physician believes that the medical use of marijuana would likely outweigh the potential health risks for a patient." | Nov 4 | 3,370,761; 57.62% | 2,478,993; 42.38% |
| Legislature | Failed | Florida Amendment 3, Prospective Judicial Vacancies Measure | Empower the governor to fill judicial vacancies by appointing a justice or judge from among at least three, but not more than six, candidates selected by the judicial nominating commission. The measure would have allowed the governor to "prospectively" fill a vacancy, meaning that the governor would have not needed to wait until a judge completes his or her term to pick a successor in situations where a judge | Nov 4 | 2,576,737; 47.90% | 2,802,541; 52.10% |

=== Georgia ===
| Origin | Status | Measure | Description (Result of a "yes" vote) | Date | Yes | No |
|---|---|---|---|---|---|---|
| Legislature | Approved | Georgia Income Tax Rate Cap, Amendment A | Prohibit the state from increasing the maximum state income tax rate above that in effect on January 1, 2015. | Nov 4 | 1,855,380; 73.88% | 655,917; 26.12% |
| Legislature | Approved | Georgia Reckless Driving Fines for Injury Trust Fund, Amendment B | Empower the legislature to impose additional penalties or fees for the offense of reckless driving. According to Amendment B, the additional penalties are to be allocated to the Brain and Spinal Injury Trust Fund. | Nov 4 | 1,735,432; 69.84% | 749,490; 30.16% |
| Legislature | Approved | Georgia Private College Buildings Tax Exemption, Referendum 1 | Extend a "public property" ad valorem tax exemption to privately held and operated student dormitories and parking decks that are obliged by contract to serve universities within the University of Georgia system. | Nov 4 | 1,839,537; 73.67% | 657,367; 26.33% |

=== Hawaii ===
| Origin | Status | Measure | Description (Result of a "yes" vote) | Date | Yes | No |
|---|---|---|---|---|---|---|
| Legislature | Approved | Hawaii Disclosure of Judicial Nominees' Names, Amendment 1 | Require the judicial selection commission to disclose to the public the list of judicial nominees for each vacancy when the list is presented to the governor or chief justice. | Nov 4 | 302,953; 81.98% (Note: In order for a ballot measure amending the Hawaii Constitution to become law, the votes in favor of it must equal or surpass a majority of all votes cast in the election. The percentages listed for the Amendments subsequently do not add up to 100 percent due to there having been ballots cast that had left the Amendment questions blank.) | 41,308; 11.18% |
| Legislature | Approved | Hawaii Bonds for Agricultural Enterprises, Amendment 2 | Empower the legislature to issue special purpose revenue bonds in order to offer loans and financial assistance to agricultural enterprises. | Nov 4 | 185,531; 50.20% | 152,222; 41.19% |
| Legislature | Failed | Hawaii Mandatory Retirement Age for Justices and Judges, Amendment 3 | Increase the mandatory age of retirement for judges and justices from 70 to 80. | Nov 4 | 81,406; 22.03% | 268,958; 72.78% |
| Legislature | Failed | Hawaii Amendment 4, Public Funding for Private Early Childhood Education Programs Measure | Create an exception to the state’s ban on funding private educational institutions to allow public funds to be used for private early childhood education programs. | Nov 4 | 160,238; 43.36% | 192,247; 52.02% |
| Legislature | Approved | Hawaii Bonds for Dam and Reservoir Assistance, Amendment 5 | Empower the legislature to issue special purpose revenue bonds in order to offer loans and financial assistance to dam and reservoir owners, so that they can make facility improvements. | Nov 4 | 234,016; 63.32% | 106,377; 28.790% |

=== Idaho ===
| Origin | Status | Measure | Description (Result of a "yes" vote) | Date | Yes | No |
|---|---|---|---|---|---|---|
| Legislature | Failed | Idaho Legislative Delegation of Rulemaking Amendment, HJR 2 | Empower the state legislature to delegate rulemaking authorities to executive agencies and to approve or reject the administrative rules devised by those agencies. | Nov 4 | 201,174; 49.41% | 205,949; 50.59% |

=== Illinois ===
| Origin | Status | Measure | Description (Result of a "yes" vote) | Date | Yes | No |
|---|---|---|---|---|---|---|
| Legislature | Approved | Illinois Right to Vote Amendment | Provide that no person shall be denied the right to register to vote or cast a ballot in an election based on race, color, ethnicity, language, national origin, religion, sex, sexual orientation or income. | Nov 4 | 2,350,114; 64.08% (Note: In order for a ballot measure amending the Illinois Constitution to become law, the measure must be approved by either three-fifths of those voting on the question or by a majority of people voting in the election.) | 960,181; 26.16% |
| Legislature | Approved | Illinois Marsy's Law Crime Victims' Bill of Rights Amendment | strengthen the Crime Victims' Bill of Rights. Specifically, the amendment was meant to guarantee that a victim has a right to be free from harassment, intimidation and abuse throughout the criminal trial process, a right to notice and to a hearing before a court ruling on access to any of the victim’s records, information or communications, a right to be heard at any post-arraignment court proceeding in which a victim’s right is at issue and at any court proceeding involving a post-arraignment release decision, plea or sentencing, a consideration of the safety of the victim and their family in determining bail and conditions of release after arrest and conviction of the defendant, and that the accused does not have standing to assert the rights of a victim. | Nov 4 | 2,653,475; 72.36% | 728,991; 19.86% |
| Advisory Question | Approved | Illinois Minimum Wage Increase Question | Advise the legislature as to whether the hourly minimum wage should be increased to $10 by January 1, 2015. | Nov 4 | 2,339,173; 63.74% (Note: The percentage of votes for or against an Illinois Advisory Question is in reference to the amount of total votes cast in the election. As such, The percentages listed for the Advisory Question do not add up to 100 percent due to cast ballots that had left the Advisory Question blank.) | 1,165,524; 31.76% |
| Advisory Question | Approved | Illinois Birth Control in Prescription Drug Coverage Question | Advise the legislature as to whether prescription birth control should be covered in health insurance plans with prescription drug coverage. | Nov 4 | 2,312,101; 63.00% | 1,186,937; 32.34% |
| Advisory Question | Approved | Illinois Millionaire Tax Increase for Education Question | Advise the legislature as to whether there should be a tax increase on incomes greater than one million dollars by 3 percent for the purpose of providing additional revenue to school districts based on their number of students. | Nov 4 | 2,200,033; 59.95% | 1,256,642; 34.24% |

=== Kansas ===
| Origin | Status | Measure | Description (Result of a "yes" vote) | Date | Yes | No |
|---|---|---|---|---|---|---|
| Legislature | Approved | Kansas Charitable Gaming Measure, SCR 1618 | Authorize the legislature to permit the conduct of charitable raffles or other forms of charitable gaming by certain nonprofit organizations. | Nov 4 | 612,582; 74.59% | 208,695; 25.41% |

=== Louisiana ===
| Origin | Status | Measure | Description (Result of a "yes" vote) | Date | Yes | No |
|---|---|---|---|---|---|---|
| Legislature | Approved | Louisiana Medical Assistance Trust Fund, Amendment 1 | Give constitutional protection to the Medical Assistance Trust Fund; forbidding the legislature from raiding the trust fund to use funds for other budgetary purposes, and setting a baseline compensation rate for nursing homes, pharmacies and intermediate-care facilities that pay provider fees. | Nov 4 | 777,310; 56.15% | 606,983; 43.85% |
| Legislature | Approved | Louisiana Hospital Stabilization Fund, Amendment 2 | Create a “Hospital Stabilization Fund” into which hospitals can deposit money in order to draw down more federal Medicaid matching funds, of which the assessment fee on eligible hospitals is to be determined by the legislature. | Nov 4 | 771,253; 56.22% | 600,705; 43.78% |
| Legislature | Failed | Louisiana Tax Collector Involvement in Tax Sales, Amendment 3 | Permit authorized private firms to assist local governments in the tax sale process, including in the sale of property for delinquent taxes. Additionally, mandate that the fee charged by the firm be included within the costs that the collector may recover in the tax sale. | Nov 4 | 478,527; 35.80% | 858,112; 64.20% |
| Legislature | Failed | Louisiana Transportation Infrastructure Bank, Amendment 4 | Authorize the investment of public funds to create a state infrastructure bank able to loan, pledge, guarantee and donate public funds to eligible transportation projects. | Nov 4 | 429,927; 32.45% | 895,069; 67.55% |
| Legislature | Failed | Louisiana Mandatory Judicial Retirement Age, Amendment 5 | Eliminate all mandatory age-based retirement requirements for state judges. | Nov 4 | 562,780; 41.81% | 783,402; 58.19% |
| Legislature | Approved | Louisiana Orleans Parish Tax for Fire and Police Protection, Amendment 6 | Authorize Orleans Parish to increase the annual ad valorem tax levied for fire and police protection and require that the revenue raised as a result of increasing the special millage caps for fire and police from five to ten mills, to be used for fire and police protection service enhancements. | Nov 4 | 672,431; 51.15% | 642,097; 48.85% |
| Legislature | Approved | Louisiana Disabled Veterans Homestead Exemption Correction, Amendment 7 | Empower parishes to grant veterans rated with 100 percent “unemployability” a homestead exemption of $150,000. | Nov 4 | 993,425; 74.41% | 341,620; 25.59% |
| Legislature | Approved | Louisiana Artificial Reef Development Fund Protection, Amendment 8 | Create an “Artificial Reef Fund” to manage an artificial reef system, the wild seafood certification program, and inshore fisheries habitat enhancement projects. | Nov 4 | 758,142; 57.19% | 567,483; 42.81% |
| Legislature | Failed | Louisiana Permanently Disabled Homeowners Tax Break, Amendment 9 | Delete the requirement that permanently and totally disabled homeowners certify their adjusted gross income annually in order to have their property assessment capped. | Nov 4 | 619,637; 46.88% | 702,196; 53.12% |
| Legislature | Approved | Louisiana Redemption of Blighted Property, Amendment 10 | Shorten the redemption period from three years to eighteen months for blighted, hazardous, uninhabitable or abandoned property sold at a tax sale due to the previous owner’s failure to pay property taxes. | Nov 4 | 714,134; 54.32% | 600,487; 45.68% |
| Legislature | Failed | Louisiana Twenty-One Executive Departments, Amendment 11 | Change the maximum number of executive branch departments of the state government from 20 to 21. | Nov 4 | 392,849; 29.82% | 924,413; 70.18% |
| Legislature | Failed | Louisiana Wildlife and Fisheries Commission Membership, Amendment 12 | Require that two of the four at-large non-industry members of the Wildlife and Fisheries Commission be from northern Louisiana. | Nov 4 | 538,717; 41.12% | 771,415; 58.88% |
| Legislature | Failed | Louisiana Sale of New Orleans Property, Amendment 13 | Authorize the governing body of New Orleans to sell property in the city's Lower Ninth Ward with the property's sale price fixed by the Louisiana Legislature. | Nov 4 | 529,163; 40.56% | 775,434; 59.44% |
| Legislature | Failed | Louisiana Tax Rebate Debate, Amendment 14 | Prohibit legislators from introducing legislation related to tax exemptions, credits, rebates and other tax break programs during legislative sessions in even-numbered years. | Nov 4 | 538,241; 41.39% | 762,210; 58.61% |

=== Maine ===
| Origin | Status | Measure | Description (Result of a "yes" vote) | Date | Yes | No |
|---|---|---|---|---|---|---|
| Citizens | Failed | Maine Bear Hunting Ban Initiative, Question 1 | Ban the use of bait, dogs or traps in bear hunting except to protect property, public safety, or research. | Nov 4 | 281,728; 46.59% | 323,024; 53.41% |
| Bond Issue | Approved | Maine Agriculture, Natural Resources and Human Health Bond Issue, Question 2 | Issue $8 million in bonds to support agriculture, natural resources industries and human health monitoring. | Nov 4 | 354,086; 60.30% | 233,148; 39.70% |
| Bond Issue | Approved | Maine Small Business Bond Issue, Question 3 | Issue $4 million in bonds to insure loans to small businesses and $8 million in bonds for flexible loans to small businesses. | Nov 4 | 362,237; 61.94% | 222,576; 38.06% |
| Bond Issue | Approved | Maine Cancer and Aging Research Center Bond Issue, Question 4 | Issue $10 million in bonds to build a research center for genetic solutions to cancer and diseases of aging. | Nov 4 | 367,114; 62.72% | 218,211; 37.28% |
| Bond Issue | Approved | Maine Tissue Repair and Regeneration Laboratory Bond Issue, Question 5 | Issue $3 million in bonds to modernize and expand laboratory specializing in tissue repair and regeneration. | Nov 4 | 297,008; 51.15% | 283,632; 48.85% |
| Bond Issue | Approved | Maine Clean Water and Wetlands Bond Issue, Question 6 | Issue $10 million in bonds to ensure clean water, protect drinking water and restore wetlands. | Nov 4 | 379,606; 64.59% | 208,105; 35.41% |
| Bond Issue | Approved | Maine Marine Businesses Bond Issue, Question 7 | Issue $7 million in bonds to facilitate growth of marine businesses. | Nov 4 | 344,783; 59.08% | 238,793; 40.92% |

=== Maryland ===
| Origin | Status | Measure | Description (Result of a "yes" vote) | Date | Yes | No |
|---|---|---|---|---|---|---|
| Legislature | Approved | Maryland Transportation Fund Amendment, Question 1 | Provide for the establishment of a constitutionally-defined transportation trust fund and require that revenue in the fund be used for paying transportation-related bond debt and for the construction and maintenance of highways, requiring that the revenue in the fund not be transferred to the state general fund or a special fund, except to the Maryland Transportation Authority, Maryland Transportation Authority Fund, counties, municipalities and Baltimore or when the governor declares a fiscal emergency or the legislature obtains a three-fifths vote in both chambers. | Nov 4 | 1,283,053; 81.65% | 288,411; 18.35% |
| Legislature | Approved | Maryland Special Elections for County Executive Vacancies Amendment, Question 2 | Permit a county charter to provide for filling vacancies in county executive offices through special elections; exempt special elections for county executive officers from the requirement that state and local special elections be held on the Tuesday after the first Monday of November on even-numbered years; and allow county executive special elections to be conducted by mail. | Nov 4 | 1,244,113; 80.54% | 300,607; 19.46% |

=== Massachusetts ===
| Origin | Status | Measure | Description (Result of a "yes" vote) | Date | Yes | No |
|---|---|---|---|---|---|---|
| Citizens | Approved | Massachusetts Question 1, Automatic Gas Tax Increase Repeal Initiative | Repeal a 2013 law that automatically adjusted gas taxes according to inflation, allowing for automatic annual increases in the state's gas tax. | Nov 4 | 1,095,229; 52.97% | 972,271; 47.03% |
| Citizens | Failed | Massachusetts Question 2, Expansion of Bottle Deposits Initiative | Expand the state’s beverage container deposit law to require deposits on all containers of nonalcoholic drinks, except beverages derived from dairy, infant formula or medications. | Nov 4 | 564,381; 26.55% | 1,561,591; 73.45% |
| Citizens | Failed | Massachusetts Question 3, Casino Repeal Initiative | Repeal a 2011 law allowing resort casinos to operate within the state. | Nov 4 | 845,880; 39.95% | 1,271,404; 60.05% |
| Citizens | Approved | Massachusetts Question 4, Paid Sick Days Initiative | Enable employees who work for employers with eleven or more employees to earn and use up to 40 hours of paid sick time per year. | Nov 4 | 1,256,841; 59.38% | 859,621; 40.62% |

=== Michigan ===
| Origin | Status | Measure | Description (Result of a "yes" vote) | Date | Yes | No |
|---|---|---|---|---|---|---|
| Legislature | Approved | Michigan Use Tax and Community Stabilization Share, Proposal 1 | Acctivate a package of legislatively approved bills that were designed to phase out the Personal Property Tax or PPT on industrial and commercial personal property, levy an Essential Services Assessment millage tax on industrial property that is exempted from the PPT, split the State Use Tax into two taxes known as the State Share Tax and the Local Community Stabilization Share Tax, create a Local Community Stabilization Authority to administer the Local Community Stabilization Share Tax, replace the revenue local governments would lose without the PPT with revenue from the Local Community Stabilization Share Tax, and replace some of the revenue the state government would lose with revenue from the Essential Services Assessment. | Aug 5 | 863,459; 69.29% | 382,770; 30.71% |
| Veto Referendum | Failed | Michigan Wolf Hunting Referendum, Proposal 1 | Upheld Public Act 520, which allowed for establishing wolf hunting seasons and designated the wolf as a game animal. | Nov 4 | 1,318,080; 45.07% | 1,606,328; 54.93% |
| Veto Referendum | Failed | Michigan Natural Resources Commission Referendum, Proposal 2 | Uphold Public Act 21 of 2013, a law that allowed the Natural Resources Commission to directly designate game species and determine hunting seasons. | Nov 4 | 1,051,426; 36.16% | 1,856,603; 63.84% |

=== Mississippi ===
| Origin | Status | Measure | Description (Result of a "yes" vote) | Date | Yes | No |
|---|---|---|---|---|---|---|
| Legislature | Approved | Mississippi Right to Hunt and Fish Amendment, HCR 30 | Establish a constitutional right to hunt, fish and harvest game species. | Nov 4 | 524,423; 87.97% | 71,683; 12.03% |

=== Missouri ===
| Origin | Status | Measure | Description (Result of a "yes" vote) | Date | Yes | No |
|---|---|---|---|---|---|---|
| Legislature | Approved | Missouri Amendment 1, Constitutional Right to Farm Measure | Guarantee farmers and ranchers the right to engage in their livelihoods and produce food for others. | Aug 5 | 499,963; 50.12% | 497,588; 49.88% |
| Legislature | Approved | Missouri Amendment 5, Right to Bear Arms Strict Scrutiny and Unalienable Right Measure | Establish the unalienable right of citizens to keep and bear arms, ammunition and accessories associated with the normal functioning of such arms, for the purpose of defense of one’s person, family, home and property. | Aug 5 | 602,863; 60.95% | 386,308; 39.05% |
| Legislature | Failed | Missouri Temporary Sales and Use Tax Increase for Transportation, Amendment 7 | Impose a temporary 0.75 percent increase on the state sales and use tax to fund transportation projects for no more than 10 years. | Aug 5 | 408,288; 40.82% | 591,932; 59.18% |
| Legislature | Failed | Missouri Veterans Lottery Ticket, Amendment 8 | Allow for the creation of a new lottery ticket to fund veterans' programs. | Aug 5 | 441,520; 45.01% | 539,519; 54.99% |
| Legislature | Approved | Missouri Electronic Data Protection, Amendment 9 | Add electronic communications and data to the Missouri Constitution's prohibition against unreasonable searches and seizures. | Aug 5 | 729,752; 74.75% | 246,515; 25.25% |
| Legislature | Approved | Missouri Evidence in Sexual Crimes Against Minors, Amendment 2 | Allow relevant evidence of prior criminal acts, also known as propensity evidence, to be admissible in court in prosecutions of sexual crimes involving a victim under 18 years old. | Nov 4 | 1,018,773; 71.98% | 396,519; 28.02% |
| Citizens | Failed | Missouri Teacher Performance Evaluation, Amendment 3 | Implement teacher performance evaluations that would be used to determine whether a teacher should be dismissed, retained, demoted or promoted, and prevent teachers from collectively bargaining over the terms of these evaluations. | Nov 4 | 339,422; 23.57% | 1,100,628; 76.43% |
| Legislature | Failed | Missouri Early Voting Period, Amendment 6 | Establish a six-day long early voting period starting in 2016. | Nov 4 | 416,447; 29.70% | 985,966; 70.30% |
| Legislature | Approved | Missouri Gubernatorial Budgetary Recommendations, Amendment 10 | Prohibit the governor from estimating available state revenues when making budget recommendations to the legislature in situations where estimated available state revenues are determined from proposed, but not yet approved, legislation. Allowing the governor to estimate unspent revenues that would constitute a surplus from the immediately preceding fiscal year or years in his or her budget recommendation and prohibiting the governor from reducing appropriations for the payment of public debt. | Nov 4 | 791,099; 56.80% | 601,699; 43.20% |

=== Montana ===
| Origin | Status | Measure | Description (Result of a "yes" vote) | Date | Yes | No |
|---|---|---|---|---|---|---|
| Legislature | Failed | Montana State Auditor Renaming Amendment, C-45 | Rename the “State Auditor” position as “Commissioner of Securities and Insurance.” | Nov 4 | 166,758; 48.42% | 177,615; 51.58% |
| Legislature | Failed | Montana Late Voter Registration Revision Measure, LR-126 | Change the deadline for late voter registration from poll closing on Election Day to 5:00 p.m. on the Friday before election day. | Nov 4 | 155,153; 42.89% | 206,584; 57.11% |

=== Nebraska ===
| Origin | Status | Measure | Description (Result of a "yes" vote) | Date | Yes | No |
|---|---|---|---|---|---|---|
| Citizens | Approved | Nebraska Minimum Wage Increase, Initiative 425 | Incrementally increased the state's hourly minimum wage to $9 by January 1, 2016. | Nov 4 | 311,401; 59.47% | 212,215; 40.53% |

=== Nevada ===
| Origin | Status | Measure | Description (Result of a "yes" vote) | Date | Yes | No |
|---|---|---|---|---|---|---|
| Legislature | Approved | Nevada Creation of a State Intermediate Appellate Court, Question 1 | Amend the Nevada Constitution in order to create an Intermediate Appellate Court, also known as a court of appeals. | Nov 4 | 287,183; 53.78% | 246,836; 46.22% |
| Legislature | Failed | Nevada Mining Tax Cap Amendment, Question 2 | Remove the current five percent tax cap on mining, thereby allowing legislators to raise taxes on mining activity. | Nov 4 | 265,821; 49.70% | 269,030; 50.30% |
| Citizens | Failed | Nevada Margin Tax for Public Schools Initiative, Question 3 | Institute a two percent margin tax on businesses operating in Nevada that make more than $1 million, with revenue from the tax being allocated to public schools, from kindergarten through high school, and kept in the State Distributive School Account. | Nov 4 | 115,891; 21.26% | 429,324; 78.74% |

=== New Jersey ===
| Origin | Status | Measure | Description (Result of a "yes" vote) | Date | Yes | No |
|---|---|---|---|---|---|---|
| Legislature | Approved | New Jersey Pretrial Detention Amendment, Public Question No. 1 | Provide for pretrial detention of certain criminal defendants. | Nov 4 | 891,373; 61.81% | 550,698; 38.19% |
| Legislature | Approved | New Jersey Open Space Preservation Funding Amendment, Public Question No. 2 | Dedicate 6 percent of corporate business tax revenues to open space, farmland and historic preservation, lasting from 2016 to 2045, and require that all natural resource damages and environmental fine revenues be allocated to underground storage tank programs and state-funded hazardous discharge cleanups. | Nov 4 | 925,121; 64.78% | 503,031; 35.22% |

=== New Mexico ===
| Origin | Status | Measure | Description (Result of a "yes" vote) | Date | Yes | No |
|---|---|---|---|---|---|---|
| Legislature | Approved | New Mexico Amendment 1, Allow School Elections to Be Held with Other Nonpartisan Elections Measure | Allow school elections to be held at the same time as nonpartisan elections, rather than requiring them to be held separately from all other elections. | Nov 4 | 258,673; 57.68% | 189,783; 42.32% |
| Legislature | Approved | New Mexico Student on Board of Regents, Amendment 2 | Add Northern New Mexico College (NNMC) to the list of state educational institutions that are required to have a member of the student body on the board of regents. | Nov 4 | 235,232; 64.60% | 128,901; 35.40% |
| Legislature | Approved | New Mexico Candidacy Declarations in Judicial Retention Elections, Amendment 3 | Permit the legislature to set the date for filing declarations of candidacy for judicial retention elections. | Nov 4 | 218,753; 62.29% | 132,430; 37.71% |
| Legislature | Approved | New Mexico Urban County Charter, Amendment 4 | Allow certain counties, based on size and population, to become “urban counties” by appointing a charter commission of not less than three persons, drafting an urban county charter and submitting the proposed charter to voters. A county would need to be less than 1,500 square miles in area and have a population of 300,000 in order to become an "urban county." | Nov 4 | 206,671; 59.22% | 142,336; 40.78% |
| Legislature | Approved | New Mexico Land Grant Fund Investments, Amendment 5 | Allow more than 15 percent of the Land Grant Permanent Fund to be invested in international securities, provide for the investment and management of the fund in accordance with the Uniform Prudent Investor Act, and raise the reserve required to be maintained in the fund from $5.8 billion to $10 billion. | Nov 4 | 186,710; 52.50% | 170,991; 47.50% |
| Bond Issue | Approved | New Mexico Senior Citizen Facilities, Bond Question A | Authorize the issuance and sale of $17 million in general obligation bonds for the construction and improvement of senior citizen facilities. | Nov 4 | 246,726; 65.26% | 131,338; 34.74% |
| Bond Issue | Approved | New Mexico Capital Expenditures for Libraries, Bond Question B | Authorize the issuance and sale of $11 million in general obligation bonds to make capital expenditures for academic, public school, tribal and public library resource acquisitions. | Nov 4 | 236,684; 63.09% | 138,446; 36.91% |
| Bond Issue | Approved | New Mexico Capital Expenditures for Higher, Tribal and Special Education, Bond Question C | Authorize the issuance and sale of $141 million in general obligation bonds to make capital expenditures for certain higher education, special schools and tribal school improvements and acquisitions. | Nov 4 | 229,689; 59.92% | 153,644; 40.08% |

=== New York ===
| Origin | Status | Measure | Description (Result of a "yes" vote) | Date | Yes | No |
|---|---|---|---|---|---|---|
| Legislature | Approved | New York Proposal 1, Create a Redistricting Commission and Alter Redistricting Processes Amendment | Create a redistricting commission to draw state senate, assembly and congressional districts. | Nov 4 | 1,705,903; 57.67% | 1,252,213; 42.33% |
| Legislature | Approved | New York Electronic Bills Amendment, Proposal 2 | Allow legislative bills to be distributed in an electronically written format rather than as paper copies. | Nov 4 | 2,329,959; 77.38% | 681,232; 22.62% |
| Bond Issue | Approved | New York Bonds for School Technology Act, Proposal 3 | Authorize the state comptroller to issue and sell bonds up to the amount of $2 billion. The revenue received from the sale of such bonds are, according to the proposal, used for projects related to purchasing educational technology equipment and facilities, such as interactive whiteboards, computer servers, desktop and laptop computers, tablets and high-speed broadband or wireless internet, constructing and modernizing facilities to accommodate pre-kindergarten programs and replacing classroom trailers with permanent instructional space, and installing high-tech security features in school buildings. | Nov 4 | 1,921,054; 61.94% | 1,180,581; 38.06% |

=== North Carolina ===
| Origin | Status | Measure | Description (Result of a "yes" vote) | Date | Yes | No |
|---|---|---|---|---|---|---|
| Legislature | Approved | North Carolina Criminal Defendant May Waive Jury Trial Amendment | Permit criminal defendants who are not facing the death penalty to waive their right to trial by jury, with consent from the judge, and instead be tried by a judge in a North Carolina Superior Court. | Nov 4 | 1,408,119; 53.07% | 1,245,052; 46.93% |

=== North Dakota ===
| Origin | Status | Measure | Description (Result of a "yes" vote) | Date | Yes | No |
|---|---|---|---|---|---|---|
| Legislature | Approved | North Dakota Initiative Filing Deadline Amendment, Measure 1 | Change the filing deadline for initiated petitions from 90 to 120 days before a statewide election and provide that challenges to the secretary of state's decisions regarding ballot petitions must be filed with the supreme court at least 75 days before the election. | Jun 10 | 43,868; 53.55% | 38,051; 46.45% |
| Legislature | Failed | North Dakota Measure 1, Right to Life of Humans at Any Stage of Development Amendment | Amend the North Dakota Constitution to state that "[the] inalienable right to life of every human being at any stage of development must be recognized and protected." | Nov 4 | 90,224; 35.87% | 161,303; 64.13% |
| Legislature | Approved | North Dakota Property Transfer Tax Ban Amendment, Measure 2 | Prohibit the state and any political subdivision from imposing mortgage, sales or transfer taxes on the mortgage or transfer of real property. | Nov 4 | 188,283; 74.95% | 60,478; 25.05% |
| Legislature | Failed | North Dakota Commission of Higher Education Amendment, Measure 3 | Eliminate the part-time, eight-member board of higher education and chancellor's office and, in lieu, create an appointed, full-time and paid three-member commission of higher education to oversee and administer all public higher education in the state. | Nov 4 | 61,007; 25.05% | 182,492; 74.95% |
| Legislature | Failed | North Dakota Referral and Initiative Reform Amendment, Measure 4 | Require that initiated measures estimated to have a significant fiscal impact be placed on a general election ballot and prohibit initiated constitutional amendments that would make a direct appropriation of public funds for a specific purpose. | Nov 4 | 104,245; 43.41% | 135,899; 56.59% |
| Citizens | Failed | North Dakota Clean Water, Wildlife and Parks Amendment, Measure 5 | Redirect five percent of the state's oil extraction tax revenue to a Clean Water, Wildlife, and Parks Trust and a Clean Water, Wildlife, and Parks Fund. | Nov 4 | 51,775; 20.62% | 199,305; 79.38% |
| Citizens | Failed | North Dakota Measure 6, Parent Custody Presumptions Initiative | Create a legal presumption that each parent in a child custody case is fit to parent, unless “clear and convincing evidence” demonstrate otherwise. Give each parent in a custody case, unless one parent was proven unfit, equal parental rights and responsibilities, parenting time, primary residential responsibility and decision making responsibility over a child. | Nov 4 | 92,807; 37.91% | 152,004; 62.09% |
| Citizens | Failed | North Dakota Pharmacy Ownership Initiative, Measure 7 | Remove the requirement that majority ownership in pharmacies in the state be held by registered pharmacists. | Nov 4 | 102,731; 41.03% | 147,644; 58.97% |
| Citizens | Failed | North Dakota School Year Begins After Labor Day Initiative, Measure 8 | Mandate that public school classes begin after Labor Day. | Nov 4 | 109,489; 44.43% | 136,963; 55.57% |

=== Ohio ===
| Origin | Status | Measure | Description (Result of a "yes" vote) | Date | Yes | No |
|---|---|---|---|---|---|---|
| Bond Issue | Approved | Ohio Issue 1, Local Public Infrastructure Bond Amendment | Fund public infrastructure projects, including improvements to roads and bridges, by allowing the issuance of $1.875 billion in general obligation bonds over the course of 10 years. | May 6 | 797,207; 65.11% | 427,273; 34.89% |

=== Oklahoma ===
| Origin | Status | Measure | Description (Result of a "yes" vote) | Date | Yes | No |
|---|---|---|---|---|---|---|
| Legislature | Approved | Oklahoma Service in Government and Military Amendment, State Question 769 | Guarantee that government officials can also serve as officers and members of the National Guard, Officers Reserve Corps, Oklahoma State Guard or any other active militia or military force organized under state law. | Nov 4 | 540,988; 69.45% | 237,966; 30.55% |
| Legislature | Approved | Oklahoma Homestead Exemption Transfer for Disabled Veterans Amendment, State Question 770 | Allow a qualifying disabled veteran or his or her surviving spouse to sell their homestead, acquire another homestead property in the same calendar year and keep their property tax homestead exemption. | Nov 4 | 710,134; 90.39% | 75,522; 9.61% |
| Legislature | Approved | Oklahoma Homestead Exemption for Surviving Spouse of Military Personnel Amendment, State Question 771 | Establish a property tax homestead exemption for the surviving spouse of military personnel who die in the line of duty. Also stipulating that the homestead exemption would no longer be available upon the spouse remarrying. | Nov 4 | 711,424; 90.50% | 74,697; 9.50% |

=== Oregon ===
| Origin | Status | Measure | Description (Result of a "yes" vote) | Date | Yes | No |
|---|---|---|---|---|---|---|
| Legislature | Failed | Oregon Measure 86, Fund for Post-Secondary Education Amendment | Create a fund for Oregonians pursuing post-secondary education and authorized the financing of this fund via debt. | Nov 4 | 614,439; 42.79% | 821,596; 57.21% |
| Legislature | Approved | Oregon Measure 87, Hiring of State Judges by National Guard and State Universities Amendment | Allow state judges to be employed by the National Guard and state public universities as teachers, and allows school employees to serve in the state legislature. | Nov 4 | 817,709; 57.68% | 600,015; 42.32% |
| Veto Referendum | Failed | Oregon Measure 88, Alternative Driver Licenses Referendum | Uphold SB 833, would have made four-year driver licenses available to those who cannot prove legal presence in the United States. | Nov 4 | 506,751; 34.00% | 983,576; 66.00% |
| Citizens | Approved | Oregon Measure 89, Equal Rights for Women Amendment | Add language to the state constitution that prohibits the denial or abridgment of rights on account of a person's sex. | Nov 4 | 925,892; 64.26% | 514,907; 35.74% |
| Citizens | Failed | Oregon Measure 90, Top-Two Primaries Initiative | Create a top-two system of general election voting where all voters receive the same primary ballot that shows all candidates, regardless of political party. Candidates would be allowed to include on the ballot their party registration and if they've been endorsed by a party. The top two candidates, regardless of political party, would then be voted upon in the general election. | Nov 4 | 459,629; 31.77% | 987,050; 68.23% |
| Citizens | Approved | Oregon Measure 91, Legalized Marijuana Initiative | Legalize recreational marijuana for people ages 21 and older, allowing adults over this age to possess up to eight ounces of "dried" marijuana and up to four plants. Additionally, task the Oregon Liquor Control Commission with regulating marijuana sales. | Nov 4 | 847,865; 56.11% | 663,346; 43.89% |
| Citizens | Failed | Oregon Measure 92, Mandatory Labeling of GMOs Initiative | Mandate the labeling of certain foodstuffs that were produced with or contained genetically modified organisms. | Nov 4 | 752,737; 49.97% | 753,574; 50.03% |

=== Rhode Island ===
| Origin | Status | Measure | Description (Result of a "yes" vote) | Date | Yes | No |
|---|---|---|---|---|---|---|
| Legislature | Failed | Rhode Island Gaming at Newport Grand, Question 1 | Authorize Newport Grand to add state-operated casino gaming, such as table games, to the types of gambling it offered at the time. | Nov 4 | 172,139; 56.31% | 133,539; 43.69% |
| Legislature | Approved | Rhode Island Restriction on Gambling, Question 2 | Prohibit any changes in location of gambling in a city or town without further approval of the majority of electors. | Nov 4 | 200,961; 67.56% | 96,491; 32.44% |
| Automatic Ballot Referral | Failed | Rhode Island Constitutional Convention, Question 3 | Authorize a constitutional convention. | Nov 4 | 133,862; 44.90% | 164,202; 55.10% |
| Bond Issue | Approved | Rhode Island Higher Education Facilities Bonds, Question 4 | Authorize the issuance of up to $125 million in bonds to construct a new College of Engineering building and undertake supporting renovations. | Nov 4 | 186,616; 63.55% | 107,016; 36.45% |
| Bond Issue | Approved | Rhode Island Creative and Cultural Economy Bonds, Question 5 | Authorize the issuance of up to $35 million in bonds to fund capital improvement, preservation and renovation projects for public and nonprofit centers of culture and the arts, museums and historic sites. | Nov 4 | 185,917; 60.57% | 121,026; 39.43% |
| Bond Issue | Approved | Rhode Island Mass Transit Hub Infrastructure Bonds, Question 6 | Authorize the issuance of $35 million in bonds to fund enhancements and renovations to mass transit hub infrastructure throughout Rhode Island. | Nov 4 | 175,160; 60.15% | 116,028; 39.85% |
| Bond Issue | Approved | Rhode Island "Clean Water, Open Space and Healthy Communities" Bonds, Question 7 | Authorize the state to issue $53 million in bonds for environmental and recreational purposes. | Nov 4 | 214,865; 71.21% | 86,885; 28.79% |

=== South Carolina ===
| Origin | Status | Measure | Description (Result of a "yes" vote) | Date | Yes | No |
|---|---|---|---|---|---|---|
| Legislature | Approved | South Carolina Legalization of Charitable Raffles, Amendment 1 | Permit nonprofit organizations to conduct raffles for charitable purposes. | Nov 4 | 989,991; 82.72% | 206,862; 17.28% |
| Legislature | Approved | South Carolina Appointment of Adjutant General, Amendment 2 | Provide for the appointment of the South Carolina Adjutant General by the South Carolina Governor, upon consent from the state senate, and to be classified as a “major general,” rather than as a “brigadier general.” Additionally, require the South Carolina General Assembly to provide by law for the qualifications for office, the office’s term, duties and compensation, the procedures for appointment and the procedures for removal from office. | Nov 4 | 666,963; 56.38% | 515,970; 43.62% |

=== South Dakota ===
| Origin | Status | Measure | Description (Result of a "yes" vote) | Date | Yes | No |
|---|---|---|---|---|---|---|
| Citizens | Approved | South Dakota Insurance Provider, Initiated Measure 17 | End the restrictions put in place by insurance companies regarding which healthcare providers their clients can and cannot see. Allowing any healthcare provider to join an insurance company's network, assuming the provider agrees to the company's terms and conditions and works within the company's coverage area, a concept known as "any willing provider." | Nov 4 | 166,401; 61.81% | 102,792; 38.19% |
| Citizens | Approved | South Dakota Increased Minimum Wage, Initiated Measure 18 | Increase the minimum wage from $7.25 per hour to $8.50 per hour beginning January 1, 2015, and guarantee an increase in the minimum wage each year after to account for inflation. Additionally, set tipped employees' wage at half that of the minimum wage, raising their hourly pay from $2.13 to $4.25. | Nov 4 | 150,819; 55.05% | 123,167; 44.95% |
| Legislature | Approved | South Dakota Gambling in Deadwood, Amendment Q | Permit the state legislature to authorize roulette, keno, craps, limited card games and slot machines within the municipal limits of Deadwood in Lawrence County, South Dakota. | Nov 4 | 152,265; 56.69% | 116,326; 43.31% |

=== Tennessee ===
| Origin | Status | Measure | Description (Result of a "yes" vote) | Date | Yes | No |
|---|---|---|---|---|---|---|
| Legislature | Approved | Tennessee Amendment 1, No State Constitutional Right to Abortion and Legislative Power to Regulate Abortion Amendment | Provide that nothing in the Tennessee Constitution "secures or protects a right to abortion or requires the funding of an abortion" and that the Legislature has the power to pass laws regulating abortion. | Nov 4 | 729,163; 52.60% | 657,192; 47.40% |
| Legislature | Approved | Tennessee Judicial Selection, Amendment 2 | Empower the governor to appoint judges to the supreme court or any other state appellate courts subject to confirmation by the general assembly. | Nov 4 | 832,188; 60.91% | 533,973; 39.09% |
| Legislature | Approved | Tennessee Income Tax Prohibition, Amendment 3 | Prohibit the legislature from levying, authorizing or permitting any state or local tax upon payroll or earned personal income. | Nov 4 | 882,926; 66.21% | 450,522; 33.79% |
| Legislature | Approved | Tennessee Charitable Gaming, Amendment 4 | Empower the state legislature to authorize lotteries via a two-thirds vote for annual events that benefit 501(c)(3) and 501(c)(19) organizations. | Nov 4 | 903,353; 69.59% | 394,317; 30.41% |

=== Texas ===
| Origin | Status | Measure | Description (Result of a "yes" vote) | Date | Yes | No |
|---|---|---|---|---|---|---|
| Legislature | Approved | Texas Transportation Funding Amendment, Proposition 1 | Divert half of the general revenue derived from oil and gas taxes from the Economic Stabilization Fund (ESF), also known as the Rainy Day Fund, to the State Highway Fund for the purpose of providing transportation funding for repairs and maintenance of public roads. | Nov 4 | 3,213,483; 79.86% | 810,382; 20.13% |

=== Utah ===
| Origin | Status | Measure | Description (Result of a "yes" vote) | Date | Yes | No |
|---|---|---|---|---|---|---|
| Legislature | Failed | Utah Amendment A, Modify Qualifications for State Tax Commission Membership Measure | Eliminate a constitutional provision limiting membership on the four-member State Tax Commission to no more than two members of the same political party. | Nov 4 | 208,332; 40.13% | 310,849; 59.87% |
| Legislature | Approved | Utah Amendment B, Modify Election and Appointment Requirements for Lieutenant Governor Measure | Remove the requirement that an appointed lieutenant governor stand for election in the next regular general election following his or her appointment and, in lieu, provide that an appointed lieutenant governor will not be up for election until the next gubernatorial election. | Nov 4 | 291,452; 55.58% | 232,907; 44.42% |
| Legislature | Failed | Utah Amendment C, Allow Executive Officers to Appoint Legal Counsel Measure | Authorize the lieutenant governor, state auditor and state treasurer each to appoint legal counsel. | Nov 4 | 178,111; 33.98% | 346,000; 66.02% |

=== Virginia ===
| Origin | Status | Measure | Description (Result of a "yes" vote) | Date | Yes | No |
|---|---|---|---|---|---|---|
| Legislature | Approved | Virginia Property Tax Exemption for Surviving Spouses of Armed Forces Amendment | Exempt real property from taxation for any surviving spouse of a member of the United States armed forces who was killed in action, as determined by the Department of Defense. With the exemption not applying to surviving spouses who remarry, and of which would only apply to the surviving spouse's primary place of residence. | Nov 4 | 3,213,483; 79.86% | 810,382; 20.13% |

=== Washington ===
| Origin | Status | Measure | Description (Result of a "yes" vote) | Date | Yes | No |
|---|---|---|---|---|---|---|
| Citizens | Approved | Washington Universal Background Checks for Gun Purchases, Initiative 594 | Require background checks to be run on every person purchasing a gun in the state of Washington, even those who do so via private sales- with the exception of transfers of antique guns and those between immediate family members are exempt from the background checks; require that dealers who are facilitating gun transfers - whether they are through the licensed dealer or a private seller - receive confirmation in writing from the chief of police or sheriff that the purchaser in question "is eligible to possess a pistol [...] and that the application to purchase is approved by the chief of police or sheriff."; render it illegal to hand off a firearm to people outside a person's immediate family, with limited exceptions, including situations in which people are at a shooting range or hunting. | Nov 4 | 1,242,734; 59.27% | 853,990; 40.73% |
| Citizens | Failed | Washington Gun Rights Measure, Initiative 591 | Prevent the government from confiscating firearms without due process or from implementing background checks unless a federal standard is established. | Nov 4 | 929,220; 44.73% | 1,147,966; 55.27% |
| Advisory Question | Approved | Washington Elimination of Agricultural Tax Preferences for Marijuana, Advisory Vote No. 8 | Advise the Washington State Legislature to maintain the elimination of agricultural tax preferences for various aspects of the marijuana industry of Senate Bill 6505. | Nov 4 | 1,043,881; 54.41% | 874,623; 45.59% |
| Advisory Question | Approved | Washington Leasehold Excise Tax on Tribal Property, Advisory Vote No. 9 | Advise the Washington State Legislature maintain the leasehold excise tax on certain leasehold interests in tribal property of Engrossed Substitute House Bill 1287. | Nov 4 | 1,029,729; 55.27% | 833,342; 44.73% |
| Citizens | Approved | Washington Class Size Reduction Measure, Initiative 1351 | Require funding allocated in the 2015-2017 biennium to be no less than 50 percent of the difference between funding as of September 1, 2013, and the funding necessary to support the new statutory class size and staffing allocations; require full funding of the new statutory class size and staffing allocations by the end of the 2017-2019 biennium; limit state funding for the new prototypical class sizes to funding that is proportionate to a school district's demonstrated actual average class size; and permit school districts that demonstrate capital facility needs that prevent class size reductions to use class size reduction funding for school-based personnel who provided direct services to students. | Nov 4 | 1,052,519; 50.96% | 1,012,958; 49.04% |

=== West Virginia ===
| Origin | Status | Measure | Description (Result of a "yes" vote) | Date | Yes | No |
|---|---|---|---|---|---|---|
| Legislature | Approved | West Virginia Nonprofit Youth Organization Tax Exemption, Amendment 1 | Provide that properties owned by nonprofit youth organizations that are used for "adventure, educational or recreational activities for young people and others" and that were constructed for a minimum of $100 million are exempt from ad valorem property taxation, and permit these nonprofit properties to be leased or used to generate revenue and still be exempted from property taxation. | Nov 4 | 252,787; 61.90% | 155,590; 38.10% |

=== Wisconsin ===
| Origin | Status | Measure | Description (Result of a "yes" vote) | Date | Yes | No |
|---|---|---|---|---|---|---|
| Legislature | Approved | Wisconsin Question 1, Transportation Fund Revenue Allocation Amendment | Require that revenue generated by transportation fees and taxes be deposited into the state's transportation fund. | Nov 4 | 1,733,101; 79.94% | 434,806; 20.06% |

=== Wyoming ===
| Origin | Status | Measure | Description (Result of a "yes" vote) | Date | Yes | No |
|---|---|---|---|---|---|---|
| Legislature | Failed | Wyoming Nonresidential Trustees Amendment, Constitutional Amendment A | Allow the governor to appoint non-Wyoming citizens to serve as University of Wyoming trustees. | Nov 4 | 47,979; 29.51% | 114,597; 70.49% (Note: In order for a ballot measure amending the Wyoming Constitution to become law, the votes in favor of it must equal or surpass a majority of all votes cast in the election.) |
