= 2014 Oregon elections =

- November 4, 2014

A general election was held in the U.S. state of Oregon on November 4, 2014. The incumbent governor and U.S. senator, and all incumbent members of the U.S. Congress won reelection. Elections were also held for both houses of the state legislature, for the Commissioner of Labor, and for several statewide ballot measures. Primary elections were held on May 20, 2014.

== Governor ==
Incumbent Democratic governor John Kitzhaber won re-election to a second consecutive, and fourth overall, term in office. Dennis Richardson was the Republican nominee.

== Commissioner of Labor ==
Incumbent Commissioner of Labor Brad Avakian ran for re-election to a second full term in office. Although Avakian is a Democrat, the position and thus the election are officially nonpartisan.

A nonpartisan primary election was held alongside partisan primary elections on May 20, 2014. Conservative Christian groups, unhappy over Avakian's enforcement action against a bakery that refused to bake a cake for a lesbian couple's wedding, attempted to recruit a challenger, but were unsuccessful. Avakian was unopposed in the election and essentially declared victory on the filing deadline.

Primary results
Party	Candidate	Votes	%
Nonpartisan	Brad Avakian	406,798	98.27
	write-ins	7,153	1.73
Total votes		413,951	100

== U.S. Senate ==
Incumbent Democratic senator Jeff Merkley won re-election to a second term in office. Monica Wehby was the Republican nominee.

== U.S. House of Representatives ==
All five of Oregon's seats in the United States House of Representatives were up for re-election in 2014. All five incumbents ran for and won re-election.

== State legislature ==
All 60 seats of the Oregon House of Representatives and 16 of the 30 seats in the Oregon State Senate (last contested in 2010) were up for re-election in 2014. The Democratic party held a 34–26 majority in the state house and a 16–14 majority in the state senate following the Oregon legislative elections of 2012.

== Ballot measures ==
Seven measures appeared on the November ballot. Two were legislative referrals, one was an initiated veto referendum, one was an initiated constitutional amendments, and three were initiated state statutes.

- Measure 86. Creates fund for Oregonians pursuing post-secondary education; authorizes debt to finance. Referred by the legislature. Amends constitution.
- Measure 87. Allows judges to be hired by the National Guard and public universities; allows school employees to serve in the legislature. Amends constitution.
- Measure 88. Upholds four-year driver licenses for those who cannot prove legal presence in the United States. Veto referendum of bill passed by the legislature.
- Measure 89. Guarantees equal rights regardless of gender. Initiated constitutional amendment.
- Measure 90. Creates an open, top-two primary election system. Initiated statute.
- Measure 91. Legalizes recreational marijuana; tasks Oregon Liquor Control Commission with regulation of its sale. Initiated statute.
- Measure 92. Mandates labeling of certain foodstuffs that contain genetically modified organisms. Initiated statute.
