= Green alley =

Narrow path with vegetation

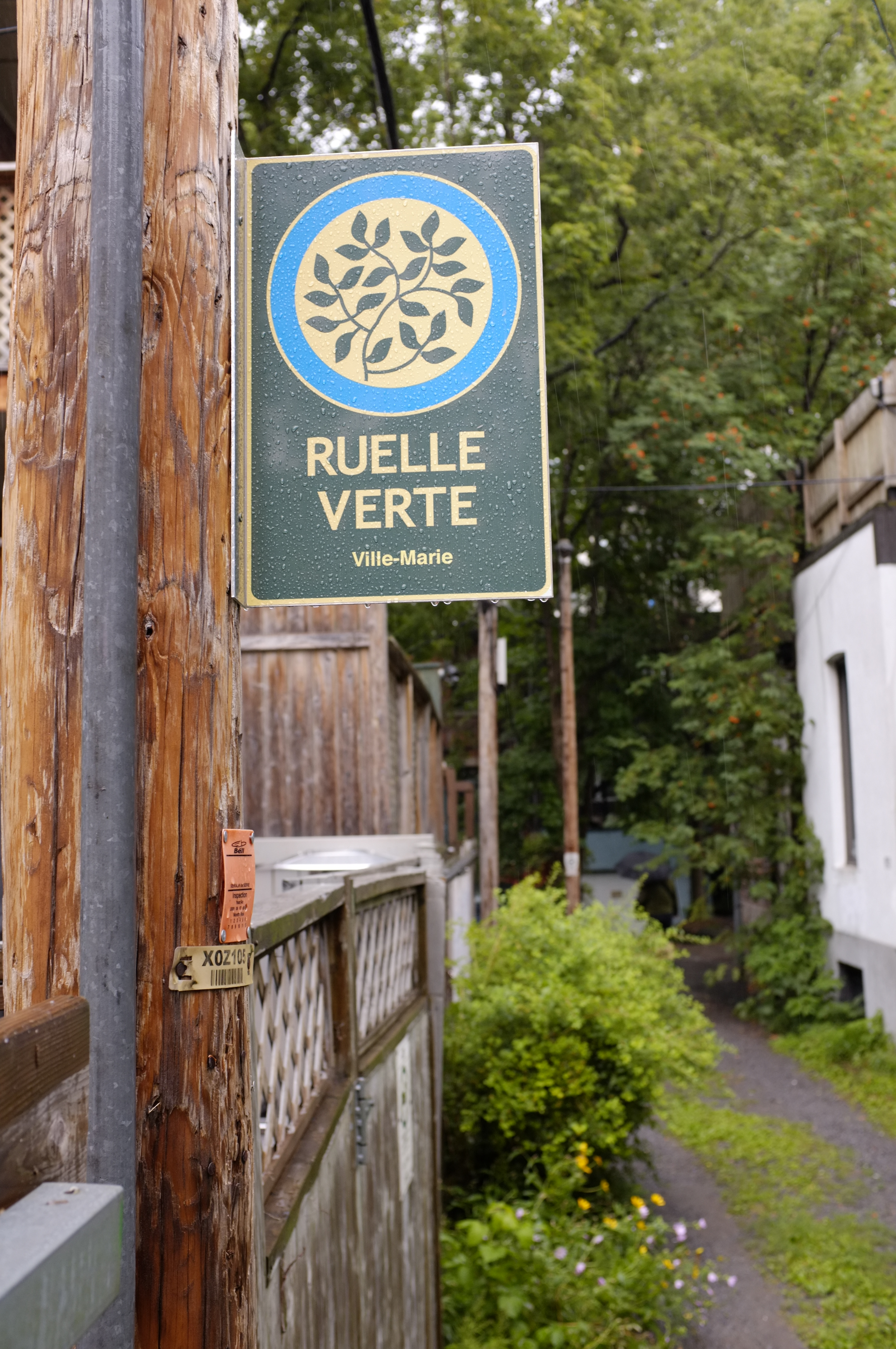
A green alley in Montreal's Ville-Marie borough

A green alley or green alleyway is an alley that has been converted to add vegetation and reduce the total paved area. Advocates of green alleys claim that they alleviate flooding, reduce the urban heat island effect, increase biodiversity, and contribute to a sense of community. Since the first green alley was inaugurated in the Plateau Mont-Royal borough of Montreal in 1997, the concept has spread to a number of other North American cities, including Chicago, Los Angeles, Washington D.C., and Baltimore, where it is known as the “Blue Alley Program”.

== History ==
The first attempt at a green alleyway project originated in Montreal in 1968. Residents of the Mile-End neighbourhood endeavoured to renovate rue Demers, which was captured by the National Film Board in the documentary Les fleurs c'est pour Rosemont. Although the project failed, the idea persisted, and the area is today part of Montreal's Green Alleys Program. The idea returned under mayor Jean Drapeau in the 1980s with operation Place au Soleil ("place in the sun"), and in 1995, the first green alley would be implemented in Montreal, along with the establishment of Éco-Quartier organisations. In 2001, the city of Chicago began looking into green alleys to relieve pressure on the city's ageing sewer system. Four pilot alleyways were funded in 2001, and in 2006, Chicago established a Green Alleys Program. From Chicago, the concept spread rapidly to other American cities: Baltimore established its own program in 2007, Los Angeles in 2008, Seattle in 2010, and Washington D.C. in 2011.

== Techniques and objectives ==
Green alleys can be constructed to serve a variety of purposes. In cities prone to flooding, permeable pavements may be installed to control stormwater runoff. High-albedo pavements or surrounding vegetation can help in reducing the urban heat island effect, as well as improving air quality. Alleys may also be retrofitted to serve other objectives, such as reducing waste or light pollution. A network of green alleys can form a "green corridor", improving the connectivity of isolated urban green spaces and therefore augmenting biodiversity. Reducing noise pollution and playing a role in urban beautification are other claimed benefits of green alleys. Certain green alleys can be closed completely to cars, which improves local air quality and provides spaces for children to play in dense urban environments, although this is less common.

== Examples ==
=== Montreal ===
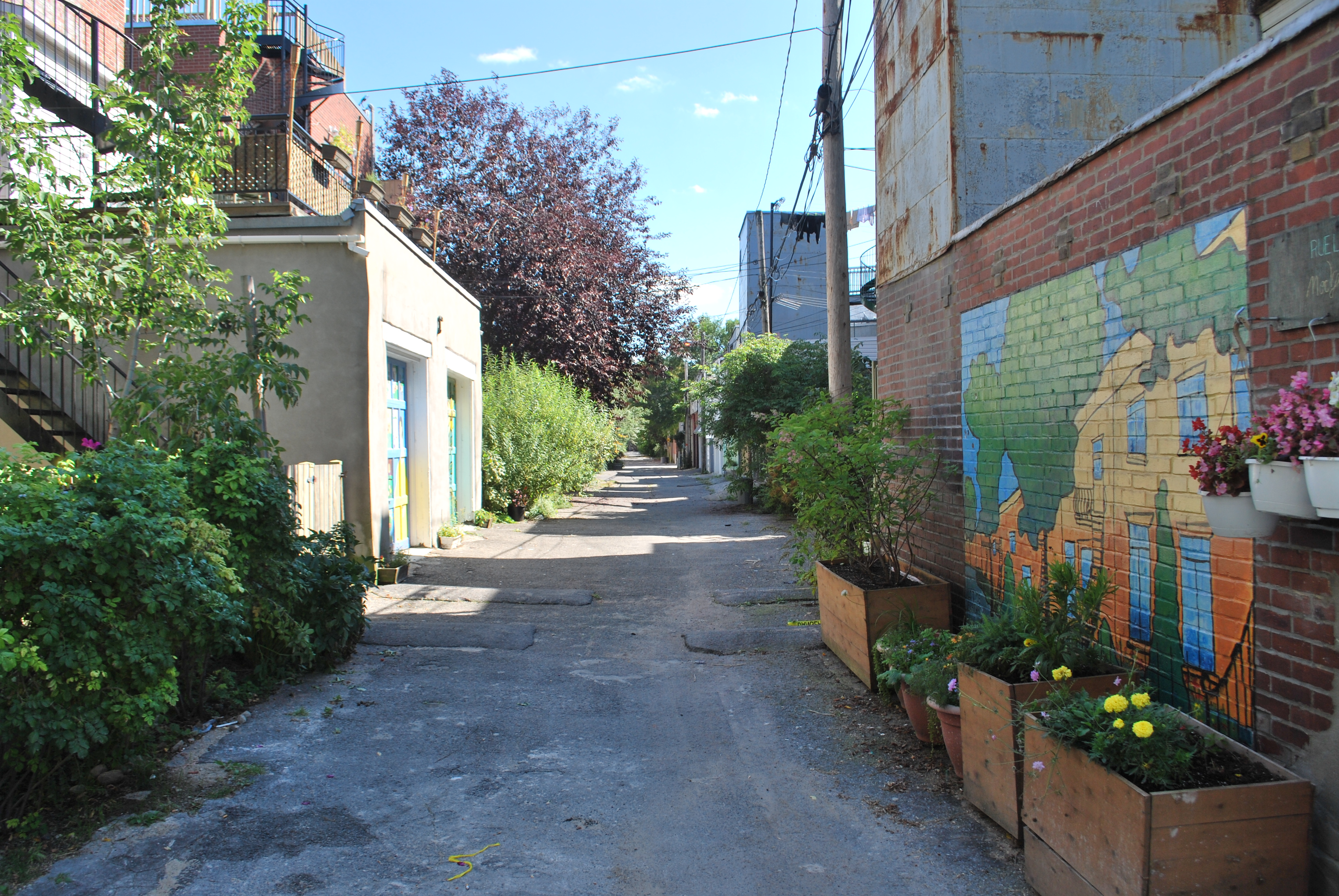
Many alleys in Montreal are decorated with murals.

The implementation of Montreal's Green Alleys Program (French: Programme des Ruelles Vertes) is based on the principle of community participation. Residents must propose a location for a green alley to the city, and are in turn responsible for its maintenance. This has led to an uneven spatial distribution of green alleys throughout the city. Geographer Emma Ezvan has alleged a valorization of "good" applicants - those with higher incomes, higher levels of education, young children, and who are more likely to be fluent in an official language. This has led to a phenomenon of green gentrification, where environmental improvements can lead to displacement of residents through a rise in property values. In winter, alleys can be transformed into spaces for skating or other activities through the creation of "white alleys". Although the primary purpose of green alleys is to provide a community space for local residents, a number of alleyways created under the program have been noted for their aesthetic beauty and have become prominent tourist attractions. Outside of the Green Alleys Program, the development of 'blue-green alleys' has been explored as a potential solution for persistent flooding in the city's southwest.

=== Chicago ===
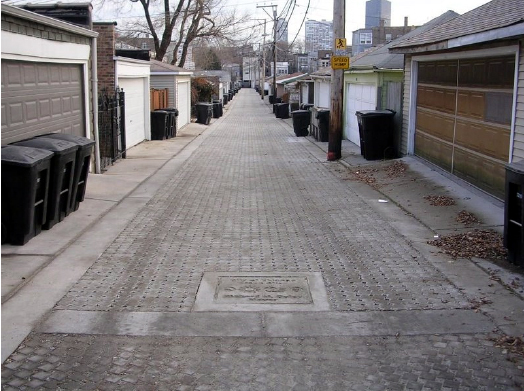
Asphalt has been replaced with permeable paving in Chicago's Green Alley Program.

The main objective of green alleys has been to improve Chicago's resilience to climate change-induced flooding. Chicago has the largest and best-developed network of green alleys in the United States, and the publication by the Chicago Department of Transportation of a Green Alley Handbook has been cited as influential in modern American urban design. Green alley construction has been concentrated in affluent wards of Chicago least prone to flooding, leading to criticism from aldermen representing wards in the historically-impoverished South and West Side. City officials have said that the cost of implementing green alleys is paid for by the reduced maintenance once they are set up, and prioritize the installation of a green alley with any alleyway refurbishment. Residents directly adjacent to an alley are required to pay half the cost of an installation, which in some cases can amount to $10,000 per household.

=== Los Angeles ===
In Los Angeles, the construction of green alleys is done in collaboration with the city and the Trust for Public Land. The passage of California's Proposition 1 in 2014 provided $7.12 billion for projects relating to water supply, which provides the main source of funding for green alley projects. Green alleys are viewed as a method to improve the poor aesthetic quality and drainage of South Los Angeles's 300 miles (483 km) of alleyways. Certain green alleys in Los Angeles have been fitted with native vegetation, and commentators have expressed hope that increased infiltration due to permeable pavements will reverse the trend of groundwater depletion and reduce the water strain in Southern California.

== See also ==
- Community greens
- Urban greening
- Urban flooding
