= 2014 Massachusetts elections =

2014 Massachusetts general election
- November 4, 2014

Part of the 2014 United States elections

The Massachusetts general election, 2014 was held on November 4, 2014, throughout Massachusetts. Primary elections took place on September 9, 2014.

== Governor and lieutenant governor ==
Incumbent Democratic governor Deval Patrick did not seek re-election to a third term in office. The office of lieutenant governor had been vacant since the resignation of Tim Murray on June 2, 2013.

Primary elections for governor and lieutenant governor were conducted separately on September 9, 2014, with the Democrats nominating Massachusetts Attorney General Martha Coakley and former CEO of the Democratic National Convention Steve Kerrigan, and the Republicans nominating former state cabinet secretary and 2010 gubernatorial nominee Charlie Baker and former state representative Karyn Polito. Three independent candidates also ran: healthcare executive Evan Falchuk and his running mate Angus Jennings; evangelical pastor Scott Lively and his running mate Shelly Saunders; and businessman Jeff McCormick and his running mate Tracy Post.

== Secretary of the Commonwealth ==
2014 Massachusetts Secretary of the Commonwealth election
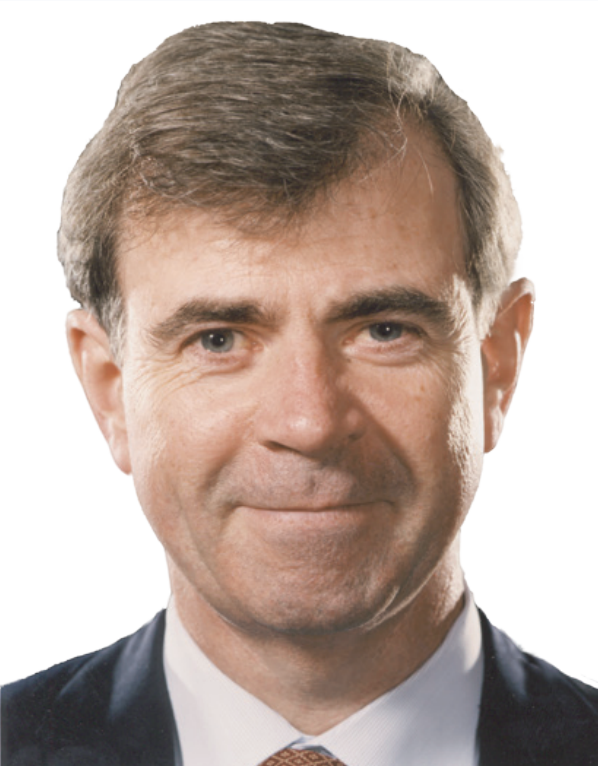

Nominee	William Galvin	David D'Arcangelo
Party	Democratic	Republican
Popular vote	1,395,616	597,491
Percentage	67.4%	28.9%
- Galvin: 40–50% 50–60% 60–70% 70–80% 80–90% D'Arcangelo: 50–60%
Secretary of the Commonwealth before election
William Galvin
Democratic
Elected Secretary of the Commonwealth
William Galvin
Democratic

Incumbent Democratic Secretary of the Commonwealth William F. Galvin ran for re-election to a sixth term in office. Malden City Councilor At-Large David D'Arcangelo ran as a Republican and Acton attorney Danny Factor ran as a candidate with the Green-Rainbow Party.

=== General election ===
==== Polling ====
Poll source	Date(s) administered	Sample size	Margin of error	William F. Galvin (D)	David D'Arcangelo (R)	Other	Undecided
Suffolk University	October 27–29, 2014	500	± 4.4%	54.4%	15%	3.2%	27.4%
Umass Amherst	September 19–23, 2014	437 LV	± ?	56%	28%	<1%	16%
Umass Amherst	September 19–23, 2014	587 RV	± 4.4%	53%	24%	<1%	23%
Suffolk University	September 25–28, 2014	500	± 4.4%	54.8%	12.6%	4%	28.6%

General election results
Party	Candidate	Votes	%
Democratic	William F. Galvin (incumbent)	1,395,616	67.4
Republican	David D'Arcangelo	597,491	28.9
Green-Rainbow	Daniel L. Factor	74,789	3.6
Total votes		2,186,789	100

== Attorney general ==
2014 Massachusetts Attorney General election
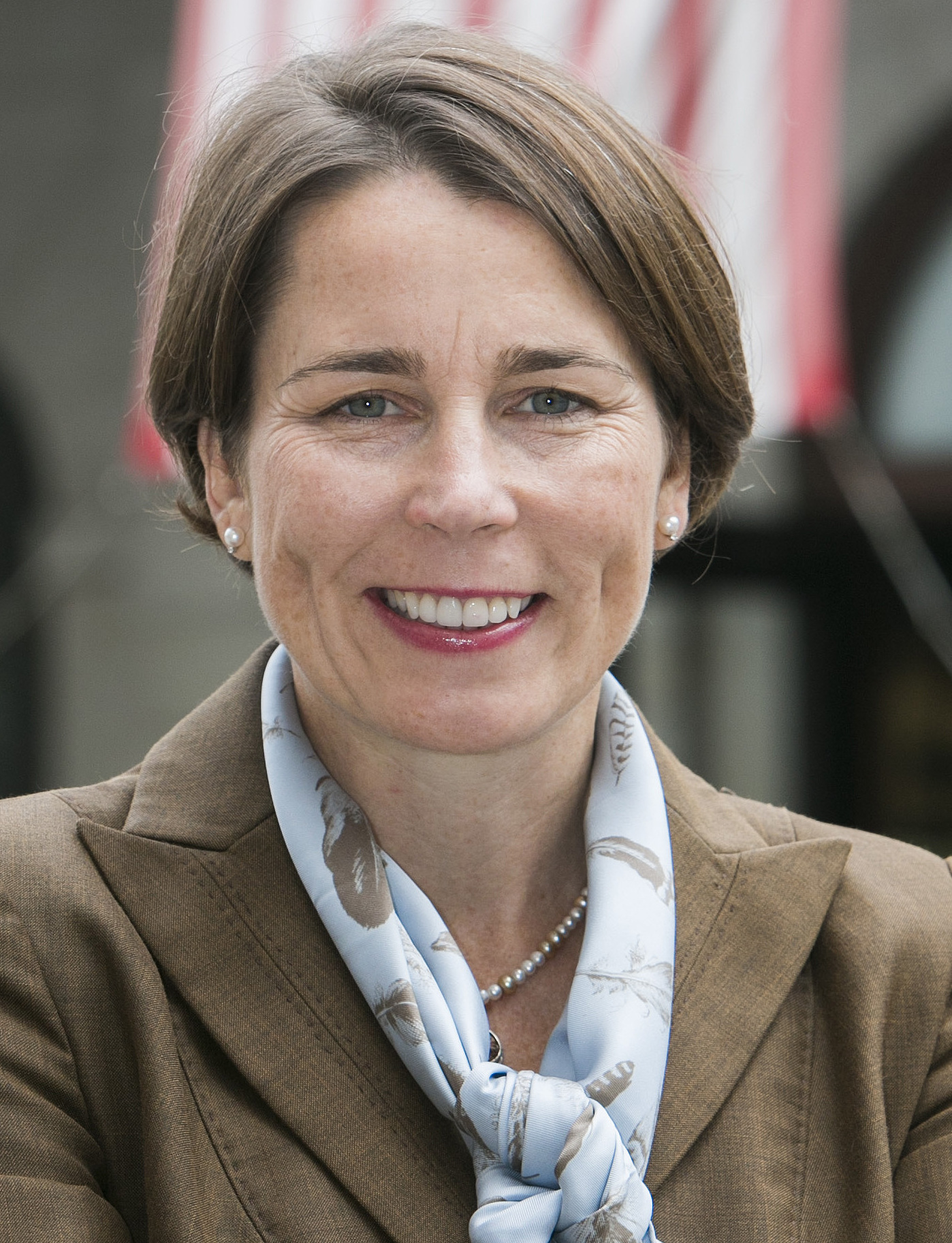

Nominee	Maura Healey	John Miller
Party	Democratic	Republican
Popular vote	1,280,513	793,821
Percentage	61.7%	38.2%
- Healey: 50–60% 60–70% 70–80% 80–90% Miller: 50–60% 60–70% 70–80%
Attorney General before election
Martha Coakley
Democratic
Elected Attorney General
Maura Healey
Democratic

Incumbent Democratic attorney general Martha Coakley was eligible to run for re-election to a third term in office, but she instead ran for governor.

=== Democratic primary ===
==== Candidates ====
Former state senator Warren Tolman and former Assistant Attorney General Maura Healey ran for the Democratic nomination.

State Representative Harold Naughton Jr. was a Democratic candidate, but dropped out of the race to run for re-election to the House instead.

==== Polling ====
Poll source	Date(s) administered	Sample size	Margin of error	Maura Healey	Harold Naughton	Warren Tolman	Other	Undecided
Boston Globe	September 2–3, 2014	400	± 4.8%	**45%**	—	29%	—	27%
UMass Lowell	August 25–31, 2014	685	± 4.55%	34%	—	**39%**	—	27%
Boston Globe	August 17–19 & 24–26, 2014	361	± 5.2%	**30%**	—	**30%**	—	**40%**
Suffolk	August 21–24, 2014	400	± 4.9%	28.5%	—	**34.75%**	—	**36.75%**
Boston Globe	August 10–12 & 17–19, 2014	358	± 5.2%	**28%**	—	26%	—	**46%**
Boston Globe	June 1–3 & 8–10, 2014	442	± 4.7%	**22%**	—	20%	—	**58%**
Suffolk	June 4–7, 2014	450	± 4.6%	**21.33%**	—	17.56%	—	**61.11%**
Suffolk	Jan. 29–Feb. 3, 2014	309	± ?	16.5%	1.94%	**24.6%**	—	**56.96%**

==== Results ====
Democratic convention vote
Party	Candidate	Votes	%
**Democratic**	**Warren Tolman**	**2,232**	**51.8**
**Democratic**	**Maura Healey**	**2,037**	**48.1**
Total votes		**4,309**	**100**

Bold denotes candidate met the minimum threshold of 15 percent to appear on the primary ballot

Democratic primary results
Party	Candidate	Votes	%
**Democratic**	**Maura Healey**	**321,264**	**62.2**
Democratic	Warren Tolman	194,844	37.8
Total votes		**516,108**	**100**

=== Republican primary ===
Attorney John Miller was the only Republican to file to run for the office.

=== General election ===
==== Polling ====
Poll source	Date(s) administered	Sample size	Margin of error	Maura Healey (D)	John Miller (R)	Other	Undecided
Suffolk University	October 27–29, 2014	500	± 4.4%	**44.8%**	23.8%	—	31.4%
Umass Amherst	September 19–23, 2014	441 LV	± ?	**53%**	30%	1%	16%
Umass Amherst	September 19–23, 2014	593 RV	± 4.4%	**52%**	24%	<1%	23%
Suffolk University	September 25–28, 2014	500	± 4.4%	**49%**	18.4%	—	32.6%

General election results
Party	Candidate	Votes	%
**Democratic**	**Maura Healey**	**1,280,513**	**61.7**
Republican	John Miller	793,821	38.2
Total votes		**2,186,789**	**100**

== Treasurer and Receiver-General ==
2014 Massachusetts Treasurer election
- November 4, 2014
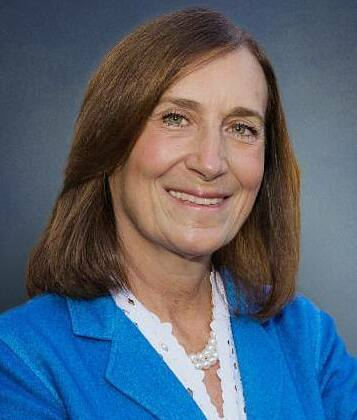

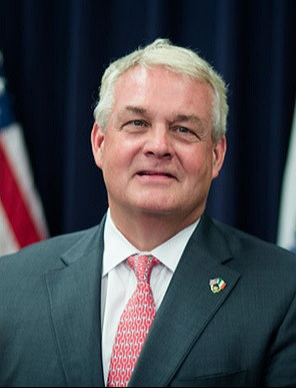
Nominee	Deb Goldberg	Mike Heffernan
Party	Democratic	Republican
Popular vote	1,120,192	828,894
Percentage	55.1%	40.8%
- Goldberg: 40–50% 50–60% 60–70% 70–80% Heffernan: 40–50% 50–60%
Treasurer and Receiver-General before election
Steve Grossman
Democratic
Elected Treasurer and Receiver-General
Deb Goldberg
Democratic

Incumbent Democratic treasurer and receiver-general Steve Grossman was eligible to run for re-election to a second term in office, but he instead ran unsuccessfully for the Democratic nomination for governor.

=== Democratic primary ===
==== Candidates ====
State Representative Tom Conroy, State Senator Barry Finegold and former member of the Brookline Board of Selectmen Deb Goldberg were the Democratic candidates.

==== Polling ====
Poll source	Date(s) administered	Sample size	Margin of error	Thomas Conroy	Barry Finegold	Deb Goldberg	Other	Undecided
Boston Globe	September 2–3, 2014	400	± 4.8%	15%	**23%**	18%	—	44%
Boston Globe	August 17–19 & 24–26, 2014	361	± 5.2%	9%	**17%**	14%	—	60%
Suffolk	August 21–24, 2014	400	± 4.9%	6.5%	7.75%	**19.75%**	—	66%
Boston Globe	August 10–12 & 17–19, 2014	358	± 5.2%	10%	**16%**	13%	—	62%
Boston Globe	June 1–3 & 8–10, 2014	442	± 4.7%	8%	**12%**	11%	—	69%
Suffolk	June 4–7, 2014	450	± 4.6%	4.44%	8.44%	**10.67%**	—	76.44%
Suffolk	Jan. 29–Feb. 3, 2014	309	± ?	5.50%	9.06%	**18.45%**	—	66.99%

==== Results ====
Democratic convention vote
Party	Candidate	Votes	%
**Democratic**	**Deb Goldberg**	**1,638**	**39**
**Democratic**	**Thomas Conroy**	**1,461**	**33.9**
**Democratic**	**Barry Finegold**	**1,165**	**27.1**
Total votes		**4,264**	**100**

Bold denotes candidate met the minimum threshold of 15 percent to appear on the primary ballot

Democratic primary results
Party	Candidate	Votes	%
**Democratic**	**Deb Goldberg**	**202,077**	**43**
Democratic	Barry Finegold	149,188	32
Democratic	Thomas Conroy	121,802	26
Total votes		**473,067**	**100**

=== Republican primary ===
Businessman Mike Heffernan was the only Republican to file to run.

=== Green-Rainbow nomination ===
Ian T. Jackson ran as a Green-Rainbow candidate.

=== General election ===
==== Polling ====
Poll source	Date(s) administered	Sample size	Margin of error	Deb Goldberg (D)	Mike Heffernan (R)	Other	Undecided
Suffolk University	October 27–29, 2014	500	± 4.4%	39%	26%	3.6%	31.4%
Umass Amherst	October 20–27, 2014	591 LV	± 4.4%	46%	33%	—	20%
Umass Amherst	October 20–27, 2014	800 RV	± 3.8%	43%	29%	—	26%
Umass Amherst	September 19–23, 2014	437 LV	± ?	47%	35%	1%	18%
Umass Amherst	September 19–23, 2014	587 RV	± 4.4%	45%	31%	1%	23%
Suffolk University	September 25–28, 2014	500	± 4.4%	43.8%	20.2%	4.6%	31.4%

=== Results ===
Municipality results

General election results
Party	Candidate	Votes	%
**Democratic**	**Deb Goldberg**	**1,120,192**	**55.1**
Republican	Mike Heffernan	828,894	40.8
Green-Rainbow	Ian T. Jackson	81,907	4.0
Total votes		**2,186,789**	**100**

== Auditor ==
2014 Massachusetts State Auditor election
- November 4, 2014
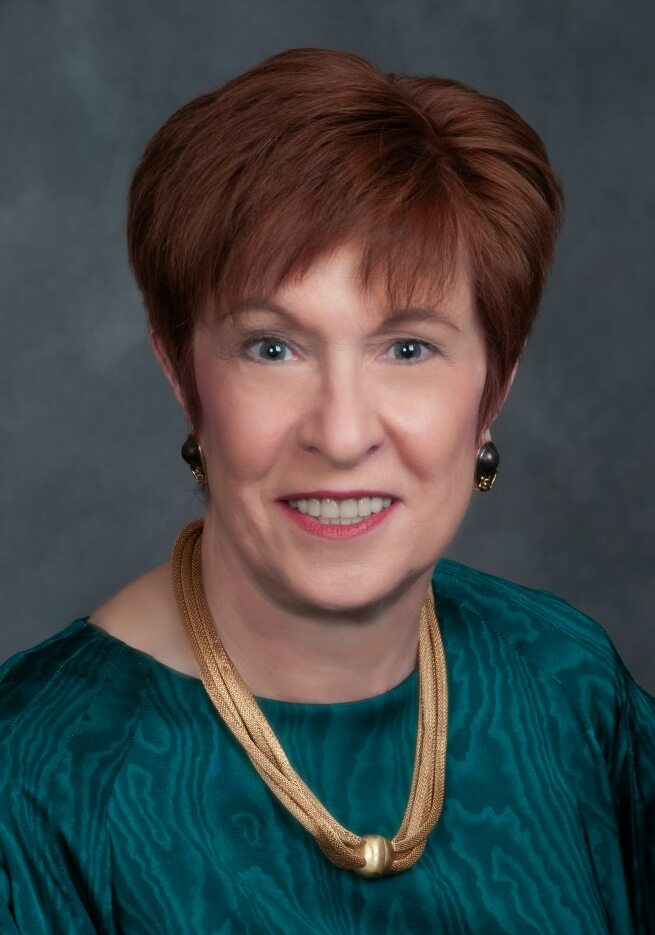

Nominee	Suzanne Bump	Patricia Saint Aubin
Party	Democratic	Republican
Popular vote	1,146,987	757,213
Percentage	57.7%	38.1%
- Bump: 50–60% 60–70% 70–80%
Auditor before election
Suzanne Bump
Democratic
Elected Auditor
Suzanne Bump
Democratic

Incumbent Democratic Auditor Suzanne M. Bump ran for re-election to a second term in office. Patricia Saint Aubin was the Republican challenger and M.K. Merelice ran as a candidate with the Green-Rainbow Party.

=== General election ===
==== Polling ====
Poll source	Date(s) administered	Sample size	Margin of error	Suzanne M. Bump (D)	Patricia Saint Aubin (R)	Other	Undecided
Suffolk University	October 27–29, 2014	500	± 4.4%	33.4%	22.8%	4.4%	39.4%
Umass Amherst	October 20–27, 2014	591 LV	± 4.4%	45%	31%	—	22%
Umass Amherst	October 20–27, 2014	800 RV	± 3.8%	42%	27%	—	30%
Suffolk University	September 25–28, 2014	500	± 4.4%	38.2%	19.4%	4.8%	37.6%

General election results
Party	Candidate	Votes	%
Democratic	Suzanne Bump (incumbent)	1,146,987	57.7
Republican	Patricia Saint Aubin	757,213	38.1
Green-Rainbow	M. K. Merelice	81,430	4.1
Total votes		2,186,789	100

== United States Senate ==
The Massachusetts seat in the United States Senate won by Ed Markey in the 2013 special election was up for election in 2014. Markey was re-elected with 62% of the vote.

== United States House of Representatives ==
All of Massachusetts' nine seats in the United States House of Representatives were up for election in 2014.

== Massachusetts Senate ==
All 40 seats in the Massachusetts Senate were up for election in 2014.

== Massachusetts House of Representatives ==
All 160 seats in the Massachusetts House of Representatives were up for election in 2014.

== County ==
Counties in Massachusetts elected county commissioners, district attorneys, registers of probate and sheriffs.

== Ballot measures ==
There were four state-wide ballot questions, all initiatives.

Number	Initiative Title	Subject	Description	Status	Yes	No
Question 1	Massachusetts Automatic Gas Tax Increase Repeal Initiative	Gas Taxes	Repeals automatic gas tax increases already signed into law	On ballot	check	
Question 2	Massachusetts Expansion of Bottle Deposits Initiative	Environment	Expands the state's beverage container recycling law to include all non-alcoholic containers	On ballot		X mark
Question 3	Massachusetts Casino Repeal Initiative	Gambling	Repeals a 2011 law allowing resort casinos	On ballot		X mark
Question 4	Massachusetts Paid Sick Days Initiative	Labor	Entitles certain employees to earn and utilize paid sick days	On ballot	check	
