= 2014 California Proposition 48 =

Proposition 48
- November 4, 2014
- Indian Gaming Compacts

Results
Choice	Votes	%
Yes	2,702,157	39.04%
No	4,219,881	60.96%
Total votes	6,922,038	100.00%
County results
For
50–60%
Against
70–80%
60–70%
50–60%

2014 California Proposition 48, also known as Prop 48 and the American Indian Gaming Compacts Referendum, was a California ballot proposition in 2014 intended to uphold legislation AB 277. Legislation AB 277 ratified a gaming compact between the state of California and the Northfork Rancheria of Mono Indians of California and another gaming compact between the state of California and the Wiyot Tribe. It would allow the Northfork Tribe to use land in the Central Valley to build a casino. It was defeated in the 2014 November California elections. Supporters of Prop 48 included the California Democratic Party, Jerry Brown (who was governor at the time), the Northfork Rancheria of Mono Indians, Station Casinos and Plumbers and Pipefitters U.A. Local #246. Supporters argued that the proposition would create thousands of jobs in the Central Valley area, help tribal economies and protect regions that are environmentally "sensitive" from project development. Opponents argued that this proposition would be in conflict with an agreement made by tribes in the past which was to keep Indian gaming to tribal lands. They also claimed the casino would be too close to existing Central Valley communities and it would cause even more casino proposals to be created. Opponents of the bill included Potrero Hill Democratic Club, CREDO Action, Chukchansi Economic Development Authority, United Auburn Indian Community of the Auburn Rancheria, Table Mountain Rancheria, Riva Ridge Recovery Fund and Brigade Capital Management.

== Result ==
Result	Votes	Percentage
Yes	2,702,157	39.04
No	4,219,881	60.96
