= 2014 California Proposition 2 =

Proposition 2
- November 4, 2014
- Budget Stabilization Account

Results
Choice	Votes	%
Yes	4,831,045	69.12%
No	2,158,004	30.88%
Total votes	6,989,049	100.00%
County results
For
70–80%
60–70%
50–60%
Against
50–60%

2014 California Proposition 2, also known as Prop 2 or Changes to State Budget Stabilization Fund Amendment, was a 2014 California ballot proposition that would require 1.5% of general fund revenues and capital gains revenue in excess of 8% of the general fund to be put into the Budget Stabilization Fund (BSA). It would also require, from the 2015–2016 to the 2029–2030 fiscal years, that 50% of revenues that previously would have been deposited into the BSA to be put towards existing fiscal obligations. It also would create the Public School System Stabilization Account (PSSSA). It passed in the November 2014 California elections. It was supported by Kristin Olsen, Bob Huff, Jeff Gorell, Jim Nielsen, the California Democratic Party, the California Republican Party, the League of Women Voters of California, Western Growers Association and the Rural County Representatives of California. It was opposed by CREDO Action, Potrero Hill Democratic Club, the Green Party, the Libertarian Party and the Peace and Freedom Party.

== Result ==
Result	Votes	Percentage
Yes	4,831,045	69.12
No	2,158,004	30.88
