= 2014 California Proposition 45 =

Proposition 45
- November 4, 2014
- Healthcare Insurance Rate Changes

Results
Choice	Votes	%
Yes	2,917,882	41.08%
No	4,184,416	58.92%
Total votes	7,102,298	100.00%
County results
For
60–70%
50–60%
Against
70–80%
60–70%
50–60%

2014 California Proposition 45, also known as Prop 45 and the Insurance Rate Public Justification and Accountability Act, was a California ballot proposition that required any health insurance rate change to be approved by the state's Insurance Commissioner before it goes into effect. It failed in the November 2014 California elections. Insurance companies would be required to submit information to justify their rate change. The proposition also would have put in place procedures for public notice, disclosure, hearing, and subsequent judicial review for the process of the rate change being approved. The proposition was similar to 1988 California Proposition 103, in that it imposed the same things on health care insurers that the 1988 proposition imposed on homeowners insurance and automobile insurance. Sponsors of the proposition had originally tried to get the proposition on the November 2012 California election ballot and turned in over 800,000 signatures on May 18, 2012. On June 28, 2012, it was determined that there would not be enough time to confirm the validity of the signatures in time for the November election. It was announced on August 23, 2012 that the measure would be on the November 2014 ballot. The proposition was supported by Dianne Feinstein, Barbara Boxer, CREDO Action and Dennis Quaid. Opponents of the measure include the California Republican Party, California Hospital Association, NAACP California, California Chamber of Commerce and California Medical Association.

== Results ==
Result	Votes	Percentage
Yes	2,917,882	41.08
No	4,184,416	58.92
