= 2014 California elections =

- November 4, 2014
- Registered: 17,803,823
- Turnout: 42.20% (▼30.16 pp)

Elections were held in California on November 4, 2014. It was the first year in which the top statewide offices were elected under the nonpartisan blanket primary, pursuant to Proposition 14, which passed with 53% voter approval in June 2010. Under this system, which first went into effect during the 2012 election year, all candidates appear on the same ballot, regardless of party. In the primary, voters may vote for any candidate, regardless of their party affiliation. The top two finishers, regardless of party, then advance to face each other in the general election in November.

The elections for statewide offices also coincided with those for all of California's seats to the House of Representatives, all of the seats of the State Assembly, all even-numbered seats of the State Senate, and statewide ballot propositions.

The primary election was held on June 3, and the general election on November 4. Although the general election saw the California Republican Party lose every statewide election (including the gubernatorial race), the party did make gains in both houses of the California State Legislature, with a net gain of four seats in the Assembly and two seats in the Senate. In both cases, the Republican gains ended the supermajorities of the California Democratic Party in those chambers.

== U.S. House of Representatives ==
All 53 U.S. Representatives from California were up for election in 2014, but neither of the state's two U.S. Senate seats.

== Constitutional officers ==
=== Overview ===
California Constitutional officers elections, 2014 Primary election — June 3, 2014
Party	Votes	Percentage	Candidates	Advancing to general	Offices contesting
Democratic	15,280,653	46.97%	15	7	7
Republican	11,611,163	35.69%	19	7	7
Nonpartisan	3,797,417	11.67%	3	2	1
Green	788,568	2.42%	5	0	0
No party preference	592,003	1.82%	9	0	0
Peace and Freedom	305,373	0.94%	3	0	0
Libertarian	99,056	0.30%	1	0	0
Americans Elect	56,072	0.17%	1	0	0
Valid votes	32,530,305		—	—	—
Invalid votes			—	—	—
Totals		100.00%	56	16	—
Voter turnout					

California Constitutional officers elections, 2014 General election — November 4, 2014
Party	Votes	Percentage	Officers	+/–
Democratic	28,423,041	50.77%	7	Steady
Nonpartisan	6,074,201	10.85%	1	Steady
Republican	21,483,596	38.38%	0	Steady
Valid votes	55,980,838		—	—
Invalid votes			—	—
Totals		100.00%	8	—
Voter turnout				

=== Governor ===
Incumbent Democratic governor Jerry Brown won re-election to a second consecutive and fourth overall term in office. Although governors are limited to lifetime service of two terms in office, Brown previously served as governor from 1975 to 1983, and the law only affects terms served after 1990.

2014 California gubernatorial election
Primary election
Party	Candidate	Votes	%
Democratic	Jerry Brown (incumbent)	2,354,769	54.3
Republican	Neel Kashkari	839,767	19.4
Republican	Tim Donnelly	643,236	14.8
Republican	Andrew Blount	89,749	2.1
Republican	Glenn Champ	76,066	1.8
Green	Luis J. Rodriguez	66,872	1.5
Peace and Freedom	Cindy Sheehan	52,707	1.2
Republican	Alma Marie Winston	46,042	1.1
No party preference	Robert Newman	44,120	1.0
Democratic	Akinyemi Agbede	37,024	0.9
Republican	Richard William Aguirre	35,125	0.8
No party preference	"Bo" Bogdan Ambrozewicz	14,929	0.3
No party preference	Janel Hyeshia Buycks	12,136	0.3
No party preference	Rakesh Kumar Christian	11,142	0.3
No party preference	Joe Leicht	9,307	0.2
Democratic	Karen Jill Bernal (write-in)	17	0.0
No party preference	Nickolas Wildstar (write-in)	17	0.0
No party preference	Jimelle L. Walls (write-in)	3	0.0
Total votes		4,333,028	100.0
General election
Democratic	Jerry Brown (incumbent)	4,388,368	60.0
Republican	Neel Kashkari	2,929,213	40.0
Total votes		7,317,581	100.0
Democratic hold			

=== Lieutenant governor ===
Incumbent Democratic lieutenant governor Gavin Newsom won re-election to a second term in office.

2014 California lieutenant gubernatorial election
Primary election
Party	Candidate	Votes	%
Democratic	Gavin Newsom (incumbent)	2,082,902	49.9
Republican	Ron Nehring	976,128	23.4
Republican	David Fennell	357,242	8.6
Republican	George Yang	333,857	8.0
Democratic	Eric Korevaar	232,596	5.6
Green	Jena F. Goodman	98,338	2.4
Americans Elect	Alan Reynolds	56,027	1.3
Peace and Freedom	Amos Johnson	39,675	0.9
Total votes		4,176,765	100.0
General election
Democratic	Gavin Newsom (incumbent)	4,107,051	57.2
Republican	Ron Nehring	3,078,039	42.8
Total votes		7,185,090	100.0
Democratic hold			

=== Attorney general ===
Incumbent Democratic attorney general Kamala Harris won re-election to a second term in office.

2014 California Attorney General election
Primary election
Party	Candidate	Votes	%
Democratic	Kamala Harris (incumbent)	2,177,480	53.2
Republican	Ronald Gold	504,091	12.3
Republican	Phil Wyman	479,498	11.7
Republican	David King	368,190	9.0
Republican	John Haggerty	336,433	8.2
No party preference	Orly Taitz	130,451	3.2
Libertarian	Jonathan Jaech	99,056	2.4
Total votes		4,095,169	100.0
General election
Democratic	Kamala Harris (incumbent)	4,102,649	57.5
Republican	Ronald Gold	3,033,476	42.5
Total votes		7,136,125	100.0
Democratic hold			

=== Secretary of State ===
Incumbent Democratic secretary of state Debra Bowen was term-limited out of office.

2014 California Secretary of State election
Primary election
Party	Candidate	Votes	%
Democratic	Alex Padilla	1,217,371	30.2
Republican	Pete Peterson	1,194,715	29.7
Democratic	Leland Yee (withdrawn)	380,361	9.4
No party preference	Dan Schnur	369,898	9.2
Democratic	Derek Cressman	306,375	7.6
Republican	Roy Allmond	256,668	6.4
Democratic	Jeffrey H. Drobman	178,521	4.4
Green	David Curtis	121,618	3.0
Total votes		4,025,527	100.0
General election
Democratic	Alex Padilla	3,799,711	53.6
Republican	Pete Peterson	3,285,334	46.4
Total votes		7,085,045	100.0
Democratic hold			

=== Treasurer ===
Incumbent Democratic state treasurer Bill Lockyer was term-limited out of office.

2014 California State Treasurer election
Primary election
Party	Candidate	Votes	%
Democratic	John Chiang	2,250,098	55.0
Republican	Greg Conlon	1,571,532	38.4
Green	Ellen Brown	270,388	6.6
Total votes		4,092,018	100.0
General election
Democratic	John Chiang	4,176,793	58.8
Republican	Greg Conlon	2,925,895	41.2
Total votes		7,102,688	100.0
Democratic hold			

=== Controller ===
Incumbent Democratic State Controller John Chiang was term-limited out of office.

2014 California State Controller election
Primary election
Party	Candidate	Votes	%
Republican	Ashley Swearengin	1,001,473	24.8
Democratic	Betty T. Yee	878,195	21.7
Democratic	John Pérez	877,714	21.7
Republican	David Evans	850,109	21.0
Green	Laura Wells	231,352	5.7
Democratic	Tammy D. Blair	200,532	5.0
Total votes		4,039,375	100.0
General election
Democratic	Betty T. Yee	3,810,304	54.0
Republican	Ashley Swearengin	3,249,688	46.0
Total votes		7,059,992	100.0
Democratic hold			

=== Insurance Commissioner ===
Incumbent Democratic Insurance Commissioner Dave Jones won re-election to a second term in office.

2014 California Insurance Commissioner election
Primary election
Party	Candidate	Votes	%
Democratic	Dave Jones (incumbent)	2,106,671	53.1
Republican	Ted Gaines	1,651,242	41.6
Peace and Freedom	Nathalie Hrizi	212,991	5.4
Total votes		3,970,904	100.0
General election
Democratic	Dave Jones (incumbent)	4,038,165	57.5
Republican	Ted Gaines	2,981,951	42.5
Total votes		7,020,116	100.0
Democratic hold			

=== Superintendent of Public Instruction ===
Incumbent Superintendent of Public Instruction Tom Torlakson won reelection to a second term in office. The office is nonpartisan.

2014 California Superintendent of Public Instruction election – primary
Candidate	Votes	%
Tom Torlakson (incumbent)	1,765,257	46.5
Marshall Tuck	1,098,441	28.9
Lydia A. Gutiérrez	931,719	24.5
Total votes	3,797,417	100.0

2014 California Superintendent of Public Instruction election – general
Candidate	Votes	%
Tom Torlakson (incumbent)	3,167,212	52.1
Marshall Tuck	2,906,989	47.9
Total votes	6,074,201	100.0

== Board of Equalization ==
Incumbent Board of Equalization members Republican George Runner and Democrat Jerome Horton ran for re-election, while Republican Michelle Steel and Democrat Betty T. Yee were term-limited out of office.

California Board of Equalization elections, 2014 Primary election — June 3, 2014
Party	Votes	Percentage	Candidates	Advancing to general	Seats contesting
Democratic	2,003,631	55.2%	4	4	4
Republican	1,624,246	44.8%	8	4	4
Libertarian	198	0.0%	1	0	0
Peace and Freedom	170	0.0%	2	0	0
Valid votes	3,628,255		—	—	—
Invalid votes			—	—	—
Totals		100%	16	8	—
Voter turnout					

California Board of Equalization elections, 2014 General election — November 4, 2014
Party	Votes	Percentage	Seats	+/–
Democratic	3,674,237	53.50%	2	Steady
Republican	3,193,444	46.50%	2	Steady
Valid votes	6,867,681		—	—
Invalid votes			—	—
Totals		100%	4	—
Voter turnout				

=== District 1 ===
California's 1st Board of Equalization district election, 2014
Primary election
Party	Candidate	Votes	%
Republican	George Runner (incumbent)	608,637	59.8
Democratic	Chris Parker	408,343	40.2
Total votes		1,016,980	100.0
General election
Republican	George Runner (incumbent)	984,604	57.8
Democratic	Chris Parker	718,129	42.2
Total votes		1,702,733	100.0
Republican hold			

=== District 2 ===
California's 2nd Board of Equalization district election, 2014
Primary election
Party	Candidate	Votes	%
Democratic	Fiona Ma	876,378	68.9
Republican	James E. Theis	396,241	31.1
Total votes		1,272,619	100.0
General election
Democratic	Fiona Ma	1,448,657	68.7
Republican	James E. Theis	660,973	31.3
Total votes		2,109,630	100.0
Democratic hold			

=== District 3 ===
California's 3rd Board of Equalization district election, 2014
Primary election
Party	Candidate	Votes	%
Democratic	Jerome Horton (incumbent)	402,244	99.5
Republican	G. Rick Marshall (write-in)	1,849	0.5
Libertarian	Jose E. Castaneda (write-in)	198	0.0
Peace and Freedom	Eric S. Moren (write-in)	134	0.0
Peace and Freedom	Jan B. Tucker (write-in)	36	0.0
Total votes		404,461	100.0
General election
Democratic	Jerome Horton (incumbent)	858,471	62.4
Republican	G. Rick Marshall	517,287	37.6
Total votes		1,375,758	100.0
Democratic hold			

=== District 4 ===
California's 4th Board of Equalization district election, 2014
Primary election
Party	Candidate	Votes	%
Republican	Diane Harkey	324,642	34.8
Democratic	Nader Shahatit	316,666	33.9
Republican	John F. Kelly	101,836	10.9
Republican	Van Tran	84,162	9.0
Republican	Shirley Horton	74,794	8.0
Republican	Lewis Da Silva	32,094	3.4
Total votes		934,194	100
General election
Republican	Diane Harkey	1,030,580	61.4
Democratic	Nader Shahatit	648,980	38.6
Total votes		1,679,560	100.00
Republican hold			

== State legislature ==
=== State Senate ===
Voters in the 20 even-numbered districts of the California State Senate elected their representatives.

=== State Assembly ===
Voters in all 80 of California's state assembly districts elected their representatives.

== State Supreme Court ==
Three associate justices on the Supreme Court of California faced retention in 2014.

=== Justice Werdegar retention ===
Results by county For: 50–60%; 60–70%; 70–80%; 80–90%

Kathryn Werdegar was appointed by Governor Pete Wilson in 1994 to succeed Edward Panelli.

California Supreme Court Associate Justice Werdegar retention election
Choice	Votes	%
For	3,763,889	72.58
Against	1,422,314	27.42
Total	5,186,203	100.00
Source: California Secretary of State

=== Justice Liu retention ===
Results by county For: 50–60%; 60–70%; 70–80%; 80–90%; Against: 50–60%

Goodwin Liu was appointed by Governor Jerry Brown in 2011 to succeed Carlos Moreno.

California Supreme Court Associate Justice Liu retention election
Choice	Votes	%
For	3,582,407	67.11
Against	1,755,381	32.89
Total	5,337,788	100.00
Source: California Secretary of State

=== Justice Cuéllar retention ===
Results by county For: 50–60%; 60–70%; 70–80%; 80–90%; Against: 50–60%; Tie: 50%

Mariano-Florentino Cuéllar was appointed by Governor Jerry Brown in July 2014 to succeed Marvin Baxter.

California Supreme Court Associate Justice Cuéllar retention election
Choice	Votes	%
For	3,605,251	67.74
Against	1,717,099	32.26
Total	5,322,350	100.00
Source: California Secretary of State

== Statewide ballot propositions ==
=== June primary election ===
Two statewide propositions were on the June ballot.

2014 California propositions (June)
Name	Description	Votes				Type
Name	Description	Yes	%	No	%	Type
Proposition 41	Authorizes $600 million in bonds for affordable multifamily housing for veterans and their families in order to prevent homelessness.	2,708,933	65.39	1,434,060	34.61	Bond issue
Proposition 42	Requires local agencies to comply with the California Public Records Act.	2,467,357	61.84	1,522,406	38.16	Legislatively referred constitutional amendment
Source: California Secretary of State

=== November general election ===
Six statewide propositions were on the November ballot.

2014 California propositions (November)
Name	Description	Votes				Type
Name	Description	Yes	%	No	%	Type
Proposition 1	Issues $7.12 billion in bonds for the state's water system.	4,771,350	67.13	2,336,676	32.87	Bond issue
Proposition 2	Makes several changes relating to the state's reserve policy.	4,831,045	69.12	2,158,004	30.88	Legislatively referred constitutional amendment
Proposition 45	Requires public notice for insurance company rates.	2,917,882	41.08	4,184,416	58.92	Citizen-initiated state statute
Proposition 46	Increases the cap on damages that can be assessed in medical negligence lawsuits to over $1 million.	2,376,817	33.24	4,774,364	66.76	Citizen-initiated state statute
Proposition 47	Reduces the classification of most nonviolent crimes from a felony to a misdemeanor.	4,238,156	59.61	2,871,943	40.39	Citizen-initiated state statute
Proposition 48	Ratifies gaming compacts with the North Fork Rancheria of Mono Indians of California and the Wiyot tribe.	2,702,157	39.04	4,219,881	60.96	Veto referendum
Source: California Secretary of State

==== Removed from the ballot ====
- Proposition 49
  Originally put on the ballot by the state legislature, Proposition 49 would have been non-binding advisory question presented to voters, asking if the U.S. Congress should propose an amendment to the U.S. Constitution to overturn the U.S. Supreme Court's 2010 ruling in Citizens United v. Federal Election Commission. In that case, the U.S. Supreme Court ruled that the government is prohibited from restricting campaign contributions and other political independent expenditures by corporations, associations, or labor unions. This proposition alone would have no binding legal effect, and it will only be submitted to Congress as a formal request; under Article Five of the U.S. Constitution, the process for amending the Constitution can only be initiated by either Congress or a national convention assembled at the request of the legislatures of at least two-thirds (at present 34) of the states. On August 11, the California Supreme Court ordered that the measure be pulled from the November ballot pending further state constitutional review: at issue is that the state legislature has no defined specific power to place such advisory measures on the ballot.

== Local races ==
Local races included:

- A runoff in the San Diego mayoral special election was held on February 11. The special election was necessary following the resignation of Bob Filner on August 30, 2013. A primary election was held on November 19, 2013. Since no candidate received a majority of the vote in the first round, a runoff election was held between the top two vote-getters on February 11. In the runoff, Republican Kevin Faulconer defeated Democratic candidate David Alvarez.
- The San Jose mayoral election will determine the successor to incumbent Democratic Mayor Chuck Reed, who is term-limited out of office. A primary election was held on June 3. As no candidate received a majority of the vote, a runoff election will be held between the top two vote-getters, Dave Cortese and Sam Liccardo, on November 4.
