= 2014 California Proposition 41 =

Proposition 41
- June 3, 2014
- Veterans Housing And Homeless Prevention

Results
Choice	Votes	%
Yes	2,708,933	65.39%
No	1,434,060	34.61%
Total votes	4,142,993	100.00%
County results
For
70–80%
60–70%
50–60%
Against
50–60%

2014 California Proposition 41, also known as Prop 41 and Veterans Housing and Homeless Prevention Bond, was a California ballot proposition intended to approve California to give $600 million in bonds for housing for veterans and families of veterans and to use money from the state's General Fund to pay off any debt from the bonds. The proposition classified "low-income" as "those who earn less than 80 percent of average family income, as adjusted by family size and county." It was on the ballot as a bond issue and passed in the June 2014 California elections. Opponents of the proposition included the Green Party of California, California Tea Party Groups and the California Federation of Republican Women. Supporters of the proposition included Governor Jerry Brown, Mark Wyland, Marty Block, the California Democratic Party and the California Republican Party.

== Result ==
Result	Votes	Percentage
Yes	2,708,933	65.39
No	1,434,060	34.61
