= 2014 California Proposition 46 =

Proposition 46
- November 4, 2014
- Drug and Alcohol Testing of Doctors, Medical Negligence Lawsuits

Results
Choice	Votes	%
Yes	2,376,817	33.24%
No	4,774,364	66.76%
Total votes	7,151,181	100.00%
County results
Against
70–80%
60–70%
50–60%

2024 California Proposition 46, also known as Prop 46, Medical Malpractice Lawsuit Cap and Drug Testing of Doctors Initiative and the Troy and Alana Pack Patient Safety Act of 2014, was a California ballot proposition intended to increase the state's limit on non-economic damages that could be reviewed in medical negligence lawsuits from $250,000 to over $1 million. It required drug and alcohol testing on physicians and for any positive tests to be reported to the Medical Board of California. It required physicians who had pending investigations into positive drug and alcohol tests to be suspended by the Medical Board of California and for the board to take further action if the investigation found that the physician was in fact impaired while working. It required healthcare employees to report any physician suspected of either medical negligence or drug or alcohol use while working. It also required healthcare employees to check the state's CURES (Controlled Substance Utilization Review and Evaluation System) before prescribing certain controlled substances to patients. The proposed ballot measure was often called the Troy and Alana Pack Patient Safety Act of 2014 by supporters following a story of two kids who were killed after being hit by a driver who was under the influence of prescription drugs and alcohol. If the ballot proposition had passed, it would have made the first law in the United States that required random drug testing on physicians. A political consultant, Chris Lehane, was hired to be an advisor to proponents of the measure. A coalition formed of insurance companies, physicians and hospitals hired a Democratic political consultant, Gale Kaufman, to advise opponents of the measure. Supporters of the measure include Barbara Boxer, Candace Lightner, Erin Brockovich, Consumer Watchdog, Congress of California Seniors and Consumer Attorneys of California. Opponents of the measure include California Hospital Association, California Dental Association, California Medical Association, California Republican Party, California Teachers Association, and California Society of Addiction Medicine. It failed in the November 2014 California elections.

== Results ==
Result	Votes	Percentage
Yes	2,376,817	33.24
No	4,774,364	66.76
