= 2014 Massachusetts Question 4 =

Referendum increasing access to paid sick leave

Question 4
- Massachusetts Paid Sick Days Initiative

Results
Choice	Votes	%
Yes	1,256,841	59.38%
No	859,621	40.62%
Valid votes	2,116,462	100.00%
Invalid or blank votes	0	0.00%
Total votes	2,116,462	100.00%

Yes
90–100%
80–90%
70–80%
60–70%
50–60%
No
70–80%
60–70%
50–60%
Other
Tie

The Massachusetts Paid Sick Days Initiative was a successful initiative voted on in the Massachusetts general election held on November 4, 2014. It was one of four 2014 ballot measures put to public vote.

== Voting ==
Question 4 on the ballot, "Earned Sick Time for Employees".

A YES VOTE on the question would allow workers to earn and use a set amount of paid or unpaid sick time per year based on specific conditions, such as the size of their companies.

A NO VOTE maintains current laws.

Response	Votes	%
Yes	1,256,841	57%
No	859,621	39%
blank	70,329	4%

== Implementation ==
The law went into effect on July 1, 2015, with approximately 200 clarifications and adjustments made by the Massachusetts Attorney General's office. The law requires that companies with 11 or more employees give workers up to 40 hours of paid sick time a year, while smaller companies may offer it unpaid.
