= 2014 California Proposition 1 =

California legislation

Proposition 1
- November 4, 2014
- Water Bond

Results
| Choice | Votes | % |
|---|---|---|
| Yes | 4,771,350 | 67.13% |
| No | 2,336,676 | 32.87% |
| Total votes | 7,108,026 | 100.00% |
County results
For
70–80%
60–70%
50–60%
Against
70–80%
60–70%
50–60%

California Proposition 1 (Water Bond)

Governor Jerry Brown
- Long title: Water Quality, Supply, and Infrastructure Improvement Act of 2014
- Territorial extent: California
- Enacted by: Governor Jerry Brown
- Enacted: November 4, 2014
- Status: In force

2014 California Proposition 1, also known as Prop 1 and Water Bond, was a California ballot proposition intended to provide $7.12 billion in bonds for infrastructure projects relating to water supply and would allocate bond revenue. It was on the ballot as a bond issue. The proposition included some specific projects to be completed if passed, including allocating $810 million for regional water management plans and $395 million for statewide flood control related projects. It passed in the November 2014 California elections. It was supported by Governor Jerry Brown, Senator Dianne Feinstein, Senator Barbara Boxer, the California Democratic Party, the California Republican Party, the California Farm Bureau Federation and the Fresno Irrigation District. Opponents of the proposition included Wesley Chesbro, Tim Donnelly and CREDO Action.

== Result ==
| Result | Votes | Percentage |
|---|---|---|
| Yes | 4,771,350 | 67.13 |
| No | 2,336,676 | 32.87 |
