= Illinois Right to Vote Amendment =

Amendment to the Constitution of Illinois, USA

Illinois Right to Vote Amendment, 2014
- Concerns the Adoption of the Right to Vote

Results
| Choice | Votes | % |
|---|---|---|
| Yes | 2,350,114 | 70.99% |
| No | 960,181 | 29.01% |
| Valid votes | 3,310,295 | 100.00% |
| Invalid or blank votes | 0 | 0.00% |
| Total votes | 3,310,295 | 100.00% |
Yes
80–90%
70–80%
60–70%
50–60%
No
50–60%

On November 4, 2014, Illinois voters approved the Illinois Right to Vote Amendment, a legislatively referred constitutional amendment to the Constitution of Illinois. The amendment was designed to provide that no person shall be denied the right to register to vote or cast a ballot in an election based on race, color, ethnicity, language, national origin, religion, sex, sexual orientation or income.

Both proponents and opponents argued that the legislation was intended to block voter identification laws from being passed in Illinois.

== Passage in the legislature ==
Before it could be to be referred to the voters, the amendment needed to be approved by a joint resolution of the Illinois Legislature, receiving the affirmative vote of 60% of the members of each chamber.

In the legislature, the bill's primary sponsor was Michael Madigan, Speaker of The Illinois House of Representatives. It was additionally sponsored by State Representatives Barbara Flynn Currie, Fred Crespo, Jim Durkin, William Davis, Marcus C. Evans Jr., Mary E. Flowers, La Shawn Ford, Jack D. Franks, Mattie Hunter, Lou Lang, Linda Chapa LaVia, Kimberly Lightford, Camille Lilly, Christian Mitchell, Anna Moeller, Emanuel Chris Welch, Kwame Raoul, Carol Sente, Elgie Sims, Derrick Smith, Andre Thapedi, Arthur Turner, Patricia Van Pelt and State Senators Jacqueline Y. Collins, Napoleon Harris, Toi Hutchinson, Emil Jones III, Donne Trotter.

The bill passed the Illinois House of Representatives on April 8, 2014 by a vote of 109–5. The five "nay" votes came from Republicans Brad Halbrook, Jeanne Ives, Tom Morrison, David Reis, and Michael W. Tryon. The bill passed the Illinois Senate on April 10, 2014 by a unanimous vote of 52–0.

== Constitutional changes ==
The measure added a Section 8 to Article III of the Constitution of Illinois which reads,

No person shall be denied the right to register to vote or to cast a ballot in an election based on race, color, ethnicity, status as a member of a language minority, national origin, religion, sex, sexual orientation, or income.

== Referendum ==
The amendment was referred to the voters in a referendum during the general election of 2014 Illinois elections on November 4, 2014.

=== Ballot language ===
The ballot question read,

The proposed amendment adds a new section to the Suffrage and Elections Article of the Illinois Constitution. The proposed amendment would prohibit any law that disproportionately affects the rights of eligible Illinois citizens to register to vote or cast a ballot based on the voter's race, color, ethnicity, status as a member of a language minority, national origin, religion, sex, sexual orientation, or income. You are asked to decide whether the proposed amendment should become part of the Illinois Constitution.

YES

NO

=== Endorsements ===
Yes

Officeholders

- Jacqueline Y. Collins, Illinois State Senator
- Barbara Flynn Currie, Illinois State Representative
- Fred Crespo, Illinois State Representative
- Jim Durkin, Minority Leader of the Illinois House of Representatives
- William Davis, Illinois State Representative
- Marcus C. Evans Jr., Illinois State Representative
- Mary E. Flowers, Illinois State Representative
- La Shawn Ford, Illinois State Representative
- Jack D. Franks, Illinois State Representative
- Napoleon Harris, Illinois State Senator
- Mattie Hunter, Illinois State Representative
- Toi Hutchinson, Illinois State Senator
- Emil Jones III, Illinois State Senator
- Lou Lang, Illinois State Representative
- Linda Chapa LaVia, Illinois State Representative
- Kimberly Lightford, Illinois State Representative
- Camille Lilly, Illinois State Representative
- Michael Madigan, Speaker of the Illinois House of Representatives
- Christian Mitchell, Illinois State Representative
- Anna Moeller, Illinois State Representative
- Matt Murphy, Illinois State Senator
- Emanuel Chris Welch, Illinois State Representative
- Pat Quinn, Governor of Illinois
- Kwame Raoul, Illinois State Representative
- Carol Sente, Illinois State Representative
- Elgie Sims, Illinois State Representative
- Derrick Smith, Illinois State Representative
- Andre Thapedi, Illinois State Representative
- Donne Trotter, Illinois State Senator
- Arthur Turner, Illinois State Representative
- Patricia Van Pelt, Illinois State Representative
No

Officeholders

- Brad Halbrook, Illinois State Representative
- Jeanne Ives, Illinois State Representative
- Tom Morrison, Illinois State Representative
- David Reis, Illinois State Representative
- Michael W. Tryon, Illinois State Representative

=== Results ===
In order to be approved, the measure required either 60% support among those specifically voting on the amendment or 50% support among all ballots cast in the elections. The measure ultimately achieved both.

Illinois Right to Vote Amendment
| Option | Votes | % of votes on measure | % of all ballots cast |
|---|---|---|---|
| Yes | 2,350,114 | 70.99 | 63.85 |
| No | 960,181 | 29.01 | 26.09 |
| Total votes | 3,310,295 | 100 | 89.94 |
| Voter turnout | 44.24% | | |
