= 2014 Massachusetts Question 3 =

Referendum that would have restricted gambling

Question 3
- Massachusetts Casino Repeal Initiative

Results
Choice	Votes	%
Yes	845,880	39.95%
No	1,271,404	60.05%
Valid votes	2,117,284	100.00%
Invalid or blank votes	0	0.00%
Total votes	2,117,284	100.00%

No
80–90%
70–80%
60–70%
50–60%
Yes
90–100%
80–90%
70–80%
60–70%
50–60%

The Massachusetts Casino Repeal Initiative was an unsuccessful initiative voted on in the Massachusetts general election held on November 4, 2014. It was one of four 2014 ballot measures put to public vote.

== Voting ==
Question 3 on the ballot, "Expanding Prohibitions on Gaming".

A YES VOTE would prohibit the Massachusetts Gaming Commission from issuing licenses for casinos and other gambling establishments (primarily those with table games and/or slot machines); this prohibition would void licenses previously issued. Wagering on live simulcast greyhound races would be illegal as well.

A NO VOTE leaves current state gaming laws as is.

Response	Votes	%
No	1,271,404	58%
Yes	845,880	39%
blank	69,507	3%
