= 2014 California Proposition 42 =

Proposition 42
- June 3, 2014
- Public Records, Open Meetings, State Reimbursment To Local Agencies

Results
Choice	Votes	%
Yes	2,467,357	61.84%
No	1,522,406	38.16%
Total votes	3,989,763	100.00%
County results
For
70–80%
60–70%
50–60%
Against
60–70%
50–60%

2014 California Proposition 42, also known as Prop 42 and Public Access to Local Government Records Amendment, was a California ballot proposition intended to make it mandatory for local governments and government agencies to follow the California Public Records Act (CPRA) and the Ralph M. Brown Act (Brown Act). These acts give the public the right to access public records and attend public meetings. It passed in the June 2014 California election. Supporters of the proposition included Senator Mark Leno (who sponsored the proposition in the legislature), Senator Darrell Steinberg, the Oakland City Council, the California Democratic Party, the California Republican Party, the California Newspaper Publishers Association and the California Labor Federation. Opponents of the proposition included the Green Party of California, the California Tea Party Groups and Rural County Representatives of California.

== Results ==
Result	Votes	Percentage
Yes	2,467,357	61.84
No	1,522,406	38.16
