= 2014 Oregon Ballot Measure 92 =

Ballot Measure 92
- Mandatory Labeling of GMOs: Mandate labelling of foods that were produced with or had genetically modified organisms.

Results
Choice	Votes	%
Yes	752,737	49.97%
No	753,574	50.03%
No
70-80%
60-70%
50-60%
Yes
60-70%
50-60%

Oregon Ballot Measure 92 was a ballot measure in the U.S. state of Oregon to determine whether or not to enact a "law requiring the labeling of genetically engineered foods produced and sold in Oregon". Measure 92 was close enough to trigger a recount, and ultimately did not pass with 50.03% of the state voting against labeling GMOs.

== Polling ==
Poll source	Date(s) administered	Sample size	Margin of error	Yes	No	Undecided
SurveyUSA	October 23–27, 2014	552	± 4.3%	44%	43%	13%
SurveyUSA	October 16–19, 2014	561	± 4.2%	44%	37%	19%
SurveyUSA	September 22–24, 2014	568	± 4.2%	53%	21%	26%
SurveyUSA	August 1–5, 2014	564	± 4.2%	54%	16%	30%
SurveyUSA	June 5–9, 2014	560	± 4.2%	51%	14%	35%

== Results ==
Certification	Votes For	Votes Against
Original	752,687	753,489
Recount	752,737	753,574
