= 2014 Oregon Ballot Measure 88 =

Ballot Measure 88
- Oregon Alternative Driver Licenses

Results
Choice	Votes	%
Yes	506,751	34.00%
No	983,576	66.00%
Valid votes	1,490,327	103.44%
Invalid or blank votes	−49,528	−3.44%
Total votes	1,440,799	100.00%
Registered voters/turnout	2,178,334	66.14%
Results by county Yes	No

Oregon Ballot Measure 88 was a ballot measure in the U.S. state of Oregon in the 2014 midterm elections to determine whether or not to refer a "law creating a four-year driver's card, shorter than the usual eight years for a driver's license, for those who meet all other qualifications other than proof of legal presence in the United States". The measure was rejected.

The background for the referendum was a law SB 833 which would have allowed undocumented immigrants to get a driver's card which was passed by the Oregon Legislative Assembly and signed by Governor John Kitzhaber in 2013. An ad hoc group, Protect Oregon Driver Licenses, subsequently collected more than the 58,142 signatures which was required to trigger a citizens' veto referendum and the question was put on the ballot as Measure 88 in the 2014 general election.

The measure was supported by unions, business organizations and groups concerned with immigrant rights. In the election it was rejected by 66% of the voters while 34% supported it.

== Results ==
Measure 88
Choice	Votes	%
For	506,751	34.00
Against	983,576	66.00
Total	1,490,327	100.00
Registered voters/turnout	2,178,334	66.14

County	No	Votes	Yes	Votes	Total
Baker	84.21	6,030	15.79	1,131	7,161
Benton	54.69	20,543	45.31	17,017	37,560
Clackamas	71.17	111,729	28.83	45,262	156,991
Clatsop	69.78	10,110	30.22	4,378	14,488
Columbia	79.42	15,994	20.58	4,145	20,139
Coos	78.62	18,943	21.38	5,152	24,095
Crook	84.16	7,595	15.84	1,429	9,024
Curry	77.48	7,513	22.52	2,184	9,697
Deschutes	70.64	49,618	29.36	20,624	70,242
Douglas	83.17	34,708	16.83	7,021	41,729
Gilliam	83.67	743	16.33	145	888
Grant	86.92	2,850	13.08	429	3,279
Harney	86.93	2,607	13.07	392	2,999
Hood River	56.27	4,716	43.73	3,665	8,381
Jackson	71.99	59,520	28.01	23,157	82,677
Jefferson	80.09	5,593	19.91	1,390	6,983
Josephine	81.92	28,067	18.08	6,196	34,263
Klamath	83.98	19,482	16.02	3,716	23,198
Lake	87.07	2,808	12.93	417	3,225
Lane	61.81	90,055	38.19	55,633	145,688
Lincoln	68.88	13,531	31.12	6,113	19,644
Linn	81.26	35,896	18.74	8,277	44,173
Malheur	82.35	6,248	17.65	1,339	7,587
Marion	72.54	74,935	27.46	28,360	103,295
Morrow	83.10	2,666	16.90	542	3,208
Multnomah	44.59	130,823	55.41	162,565	293,388
Polk	73.45	22,327	26.55	8,070	30,397
Sherman	87.70	784	12.30	110	894
Tillamook	71.21	7,600	28.79	3,073	10,673
Umatilla	80.11	15,428	19.89	3,831	19,259
Union	81.11	8,338	18.89	1,941	10,279
Wallowa	80.57	2,928	19.43	706	3,634
Wasco	74.56	6,940	25.44	2,368	9,308
Washington	65.97	128,054	34.03	66,055	194,109
Wheeler	84.89	601	15.11	107	708
Yamhill	73.53	27,253	26.47	9,811	37,064

== See also ==
- Driver's license in the United States
