= 2014 Oregon Ballot Measure 90 =

Ballot Measure 90
- Oregon Open Primary Initiative
Results by county
No
70–80%
60–70%

Oregon Ballot Measure 90 was a ballot measure in the U.S. state of Oregon to determine whether or not to enact a law changing its primary election. Rather than registered voters associated with both major political parties choosing party nominees, the measure would allow the top two leaders in an "all-comers primary" to proceed to the general election, regardless of party affiliation.

Measure 90 failed to pass, getting unanimously rejected at the county level.

== Results ==
Measure 90
Choice	Votes	%
For	459,629	31.77
Against	987,050	68.23
Total	1,446,679	100.00
Registered voters/turnout	2,178,334	65.08
