= 2014 Oregon Ballot Measure 89 =

Ballot Measure 89
- Oregon Equal Rights for Women Initiative

Results
Choice	Votes	%
Yes	925,892	64.26%
No	514,907	35.74%
Valid votes	1,440,799	96.68%
Invalid or blank votes	49,528	3.32%
Total votes	1,490,327	100.00%
Registered voters/turnout	2,178,334	68.42%
County results
Yes
70–80%
60–70%
50–60%
No
50–60%

Oregon Ballot Measure 89, also known as the Oregon Equal Rights for Women Initiative, was a ballot measure in the U.S. state of Oregon to determine whether or not to enact a constitutional amendment specifically barring discrimination based on sex, "a state version of the Equal Rights Amendment for women's rights once proposed for the U.S. Constitution". Measure 89 passed with about 64% of votes statewide, gaining most of its support in 24 of the 36 counties.

== Results ==
Measure 89
Choice	Votes	%
For	925,892	64.26
Against	514,907	35.74
Total	1,440,799	100.00
Registered voters/turnout	2,178,334	68.42

Vote tallies by county:

County	Yes	Votes	No	Votes	Total
Baker	46.02	3,183	53.98	3,734	6,917
Benton	69.99	25,670	30.01	11,003	36,673
Clackamas	61.91	93,777	38.09	57,685	151,462
Clatsop	64.08	8,894	35.92	4,986	13,880
Columbia	57.46	11,064	42.54	8,191	19,255
Coos	55.19	12,932	44.81	10,498	23,428
Crook	47.79	4,182	52.21	4,570	8,752
Curry	58.25	5,485	41.75	3,931	9,416
Deschutes	62.84	42,488	37.16	25,124	67,612
Douglas	49.63	19,913	50.37	20,210	40,123
Gilliam	48.75	410	51.25	431	841
Grant	45.23	1,421	54.77	1,721	3,142
Harney	43.19	1,250	56.81	1,644	2,894
Hood River	68.93	5,570	31.07	2,510	8,080
Jackson	60.29	48,108	39.71	31,676	79,784
Jefferson	50.61	3,386	49.39	3,304	6,690
Josephine	55.12	18,151	44.88	14,779	32,930
Klamath	48.82	11,021	51.18	11,556	22,577
Lake	40.34	1,255	59.66	1,856	3,111
Lane	67.22	95,239	32.78	48,799	141,679
Lincoln	68.05	13,020	31.95	6,112	19,132
Linn	50.59	21,482	49.41	20,979	42,461
Malheur	46.62	3,408	53.38	3,902	7,310
Marion	56.96	56,741	43.04	42,867	99,608
Morrow	48.08	1,487	51.92	1,606	3,093
Multnomah	78.57	224,464	21.43	61,200	285,664
Polk	58.17	17,001	41.83	12,223	29,224
Sherman	47.67	410	52.33	450	860
Tillamook	60.71	6,289	39.29	4,070	10,359
Umatilla	50.26	9,341	49.74	9,243	18,584
Union	50.67	5,028	49.33	4,894	9,922
Wallowa	50.69	1,781	49.31	1,732	3,513
Wasco	57.09	5,120	42.91	3,847	8,967
Washington	67.71	126,306	32.29	60,223	186,529
Wheeler	46.29	312	53.71	362	674
Yamhill	56.95	20,303	43.05	15,350	35,653

== See also ==
- Gender inequality in the United States
