= CREDO Mobile =

American mobile virtual network operator

- Industry: Wireless telecommunications
- Founded: November 1985
- Founder: Laura Scher, Peter Barnes and Michael Kieschnick
- Headquarters: West Palm Beach, United States
- Key people: Ananth Veluppillai, President
- Parent: BRPI Acquisition Co.
- Website: www.credomobile.com

CREDO Mobile (formerly Working Assets Wireless) is an American mobile virtual network operator headquartered in San Francisco, California. CREDO Mobile's mobile network operator is Verizon Wireless.

== History ==
Working Assets was founded by Peter Barnes, Michael Kieschnick and Laura Scher in 1985 in San Francisco, as a business that would use its revenues to fund progressive social change work. Each time their customers use its services—mobile, long distance or credit card—WA would automatically send a donation to progressive nonprofit groups. To date it has raised more than $87 million for groups like Planned Parenthood, Rainforest Action Network and Oxfam America.

=== Credit cards ===
Working Assets's initial product was a credit card that generated donations to progressive nonprofit groups every time the card was used. Soon, the company introduced a ballot process for its customers to vote on how to distribute the money raised among nonprofit groups. The ballot is still used today.

=== Long-distance phone service ===
In 1991, the company launched long-distance phone service, promoting the fact that it would donate 1% of its customer charges to nonprofit groups. It also featured political actions in the customers' monthly bills, urging them to make free calls to elected officials. And it let customers pay for "CitizenLetters" to be sent in their name to the officials. By 1993, these actions included calling for a single-payer healthcare system and for allowing gays in the military.

=== Mobile phone service ===
The company started its mobile phone service as a Mobile Virtual Network Operator (MVNO) using the Sprint Nextel network in 2000. It also launched an activist website called Act for Change (now CREDO Action) in that same year. In 2016, the mobile phone service became a MVNO using the Verizon Wireless network, switching from the Sprint Nextel network.

=== Name change ===
In November 2007, Working Assets Wireless announced that it was changing its name to CREDO Mobile. The names of its phone services were changed to CREDO mobile and CREDO Long Distance. However, its credit card is still called the Working Assets Credit Card.

=== Environmental policy ===
In keeping with its commitment to protect the environment, the company offers free phone recycling, prints its bills on 100% post-consumer recycled paper, and offsets its electricity and shipping costs through Carbonfund.org's "carbon-free" program. CREDO plants 100 trees for every ton of paper it uses (enough to generate another ton) and it has donated more than $15 million to environmental groups in the US and abroad.

In 2009, CREDO Mobile was recognized by the nonprofit Planning and Conservation League as the Environmental Business of the Year.

== Political activism ==
CREDO Mobile's mission of social change takes the form of two primary activities: its donations to progressive nonprofits, and its CREDO Action activist arm.

=== Donations to nonprofit groups ===
Donations from its credit card, long-distance and mobile customers cumulatively total more than $80 million since 1985. In 2015, the company said that "CREDO and its members have raised over $3 million for Planned Parenthood, making us Planned Parenthood's largest corporate donor." Other major recipients of donations include the ACLU, Doctors Without Borders, Rainforest Action Network, 350.org, and Amnesty International.

Each year, the company selects dozens of nonprofit groups in five broad issue areas: civil rights, economic and social justice, environment, peace and international freedom, and voting rights and civic participation. And each year, the company asks its customers ("members" in the company's parlance) to vote on how to distribute the money it raises among the groups.

One criticism of CREDO Mobile is that the organization only donates about 1% of each customer's bill.

In 2018, CREDO Mobile donated $4000 to the initial Strong Arm Press crowdfunding drive. This press, a small imprint started in 2018 by The Intercept editor Ryan Grim and HuffPost editor Alex Lawson, placed CREDO's logo on the back cover of its first six books.

=== CREDO Action ===
Credo Mobile also has created an online network of more than 3 million activists who take actions both online and offline. On its website, the company states:

Many companies, especially large ones, hire lobbyists to mold government policies and legislation to serve their financial interests. CREDO blazes a different path. We fight for progressive social change with 3 million of our activist friends at CREDO Action. No lobbyists, no back-door meetings, no candidate contributions. Just ordinary Americans, galvanized to speak truth to power.

During the build-up to the 2003 invasion of Iraq, the company opposed it and worked with MoveOn.org and True Majority to take out a full-page advertisement in The New York Times against the US-led invasion. In 2004, it launched an "election protection" program and donated more than $1 million to groups working to register voters and increase turnout on Election Day.

Credo Mobile has been a vocal opponent of both the Afghanistan War of 2001 and the Iraq War that began in 2003, and it mobilized against the invasions and later to push for withdrawal of US troops from both countries. This partly led in 2009 to Fast Company magazine including CREDO in its top five "brave brands".

Among its environmental activism, the company has focused on moving away from fossil fuels and toward supporting renewable sources. As such, it has campaigned relentlessly against coal power, natural gas fracking, and more recently, against the proposed Keystone XL pipeline.

To increase voter turnout in the United States presidential election of 2008, CREDO Action started an initiative called Pollworkers for Democracy, which paid individuals to staff polling places and ensure fair voting practices. For their Text Out the Vote campaign, CREDO invited users to enter friends' phone numbers to text them each a reminder to vote on election day.

Several U.S. states approved CREDO's online voter-registration tool. At CREDO's GoVote.org website, voters could look up their nearest polling place.

CREDO's political activism includes a wide range of issues – from favoring marriage equality, women's rights, food safety and increased prosecution of fraud and crimes on Wall Street, to opposing corporate money in politics, especially in the aftermath of the US Supreme Court's decision in Citizens United v. FEC.

=== CREDO SuperPAC ===
In 2012, the company launched the "CREDO SuperPAC", not to support candidates but to oppose them. Becky Bond, CREDO Mobile's Vice President and Political Director, served as President of the CREDO SuperPAC. Unlike other corporate superPACs, CREDO SuperPAC focused more on grassroots, volunteer-driven activism than on buying television advertisements. Its stated aim was to defeat candidates affiliated with the Tea Party movement, running for re-election to the US House of Representatives. Its campaign, dubbed "Take Down the Tea Party Ten", helped to defeat 5 of the candidates: Allen West, Frank Guinta, Joe Walsh, Chip Cravaack and Dan Lungren.

In 2014, the CREDO SuperPAC planned to use the same grassroots, volunteer-driven activism to help candidates of the US Democratic Party in five Senate elections. By aiming to flip Republican-held seats in Georgia and Kentucky, while maintaining Democratic-held seats in Michigan, Colorado and North Carolina, CREDO hoped to "save the Senate" from a Republican takeover.

== Influence ==
Another company, Patriot Mobile, was begun in part to provide a conservative alternative to Credo.

== See also ==
- 1985 in the environment
