= 2016 United States ballot measures =

- March 1 to November 8, 2016

Part of the 2016 United States elections

In 2016, there were several important propositions on the ballot across the United States.

== By state ==
=== Alabama ===
Origin	Status	Measure	Description (Result of a "yes" vote)	Date	Yes	No
Legislature	Approved	Alabama Judicial Retirement Measure, Amendment 1	Allow the legislature to "change retirement plans for new Alabama Supreme Court, district, circuit and probate judges, and move circuit clerks and district attorneys out of the supernumerary system and into the Retirement Systems of Alabama."	Mar 1	679,540; 62.84%	401,754; 37.16%
Legislature	Approved	Alabama Auburn University Board of Trustees, Amendment 1	Add two members, elected at large, to the Auburn University Board of Trustees and ensure that not more than three board member terms expire in any one calendar year.	Nov 8	1,182,618; 73.43%	427,883; 26.57%
Legislature	Approved	Alabama Rules Governing Allocation of State Park Funds, Amendment 2	Prohibit reallocating state park funds for other uses and allow the Department of Conservation and Natural Resources to contract with non-state entities for the operation and maintenance of land and facilities that are part of the state park system.	Nov 8	1,414,033; 79.74%	359,354; 20.26%
Legislature	Approved	Alabama Rules for Determining a Local Constitutional Amendment, Amendment 3	Change the procedure for determining local constitutional amendments so that only a unanimous vote of the legislature is needed to declare that a constitutional amendment exclusively affects only one particular jurisdiction.	Nov 8	932,652; 60.63%	605,498; 39.37%
Legislature	Approved	Alabama County Affairs Administration, Amendment 4	Authorize county commissions to establish programs pertaining to the administration of their respective counties.	Nov 8	1,141,004; 71.67%	450,952; 28.33%
Legislature	Approved	Alabama State Constitutional Language Governing Separation of Powers, Amendment 5	Reword and reorganize the sections of the Alabama Constitution that address the Alabama government's separation of powers, without changing the substance of those powers.	Nov 8	922,670; 59.99%	615,275; 40.01%
Legislature	Approved	Alabama Impeachment, Amendment 6	Require a two-thirds (66.67%) vote in the Alabama State Senate for conviction and impeachment of a state official.	Nov 8	788,399; 53.59%	682,889; 46.41%
Legislature	Approved	Alabama Supervision of Employees in the Etowah County Sheriff's Department, Amendment 7	Place employees of the Etowah County Sheriff's office under the authority of the Personnel Board of the Office of the Sheriff of Etowah County.	Nov 8	704,567; 59.38%	482,042; 40.62%
Legislature	Approved	Alabama Right to Work, Amendment 8	Add the "right to work"--a law prohibiting businesses from making rules about union membership--to the Alabama Constitution in addition to the statutes providing for the state's "right to work" policies.	Nov 8	704,567; 59.38%	482,042; 40.62%
Legislature	Failed	Alabama Increase of Maximum Qualifying Age for Pickens County Judges, Amendment 9	Increase the maximum age allowed for candidates for the position of Judge of Probate in Pickens County to 75 years of age.	Nov 8	600,579; 51.05%	575,882; 48.95% (Note: Alabama state law requires that constitutional amendments addressing issues in a specific county receive approval from the majority of voters in that county in addition to approval from the majority of voters statewide in order to pass. Therefore, despite having secured a majority of statewide votes, the measure failed as it only received 48.13% of the Pickens County vote.)
Legislature	Approved	Alabama Restriction of Police and Planning Jurisdiction in Calhoun County, Amendment 10	Make any territory in Calhoun County subject to the police jurisdiction and planning jurisdiction of its respective municipality within the county.	Nov 8	765,364; 65.62%	401,054; 34.38%
Legislature	Approved	Alabama Use of City Manufacturing Zone Tax Revenue to Incentivize Manufacturing, Amendment 11	Confirm the Major 21st Century Manufacturing Zone Act, which allowed Alabama cities to create specific zones to attract industry to Alabama.	Nov 8	866,515; 59.27%	595,392; 40.73%
Legislature	Failed	Alabama Authorization of Toll Districts and Toll District Revenue Bond Debt in Baldwin County, Amendment 12	Establish a governing body to oversee toll roads and bridges within Baldwin County and permit them to issue revenue bonds to fund projects.	Nov 8	630,834; 50.69%	613,632; 49.31% (Note: Alabama state law requires that constitutional amendments addressing issues in a specific county receive approval from the majority of voters in that county in addition to approval from the majority of voters statewide in order to pass. Therefore, despite having secured a majority of statewide votes, the measure failed as it only received 48.14% of the Baldwin County vote.)
Legislature	Approved	Alabama Removal of Age Restriction for Government Officials, Amendment 13	Remove any current age restrictions and prohibit future age restrictions for government official positions, with the exception of judicial office.	Nov 8	876,141; 57.36%	651,178; 42.64%
Legislature	Approved	Alabama Approval of Budget Isolation Resolution Proposing a Local Law, Amendment 14	Guarantee the application of budget isolation resolutions to local laws passed by the legislature prior to November 8, 2016.	Nov 8	1,041,400; 68.70%	474,519; 31.30%

=== Alaska ===
Origin	Status	Measure	Description (Result of a "yes" vote)	Date	Yes	No
Citizens	Approved	Alaska Voter Registration via the Permanent Fund Dividend Application, Ballot Measure 1	Register voting-age Alaskans to vote when submitting an annual permanent fund dividend application, unless they opt out.	Nov 8	197,702; 64.57%	108,467; 35.43%
Legislature	Failed	Alaska State Government Debt for Postsecondary Student Loans, Ballot Measure 2	Allow state debt to be contracted for postsecondary student loans.	Nov 8	130,867; 44.19%	165,275; 55.81%

=== Arizona ===
Origin	Status	Measure	Description (Result of a "yes" vote)	Date	Yes	No
Legislature	Approved	Arizona Education Finance Amendment, Proposition 123	Devote $3.5 billion of the general fund and state land trust fund toward education.	May 17	536,365; 50.92%	516,949; 49.08%
Legislature	Approved	Arizona Public Retirement Benefits Amendment, Proposition 124	Allow the state legislature to adjust the Public Safety Personnel Retirement System to exchange the permanent benefit increase structure for a compounding annual cost of living adjustment.	May 17	719,554; 70.42%	302,195; 29.58%
Citizens	Failed	Arizona Marijuana Legalization, Proposition 205	Legalize the possession and consumption of marijuana by people 21 years old and up.	Nov 8	1,233,323; 48.68%	1,300,344; 51.32%
Citizens	Approved	Arizona Minimum Wage and Paid Time Off, Proposition 206	Raise the minimum wage to $10 in 2017, and then incrementally to $12 by 2020, and creating a right to paid sick time off from employment.	Nov 8	1,465,639; 58.33%	1,046,945; 41.67%

=== Arkansas ===
Origin	Status	Measure	Description (Result of a "yes" vote)	Date	Yes	No
Legislature	Approved	Arkansas Increase in Length of Term in Office for Some County Officials, Issue 1	Increase the term lengths for elected county judges, county court clerks, and county surveyors from two years to four years and prohibiting certain elected county officials from being appointed or elected to a different civil office during their term.	Nov 8	747,856; 70.22%	317,093; 29.78%
Legislature	Approved	Arkansas Gubernatorial Power When Governor is Absent from State, Issue 2	Let Arkansas governors keep their regular political authority when out of the state.	Nov 8	777,973; 72.42%	296,291; 27.58%
Legislature	Approved	Arkansas Removal of Cap on State-Issued Bonds, Issue 3	Remove the cap on the amount of bonds the state is allowed to issue to a corporation, association, institution, or individual to help finance economic development projects and services.	Nov 8	689,980; 65.34%	366,020; 34.66%
Citizens	Approved	Arkansas Medical Marijuana Amendment, Issue 6	Legalize medical marijuana for 17 qualifying conditions, creating a Medical Marijuana Commission, and allocating tax revenue to technical institutes, vocational schools, workforce training, and the General Fund.	Nov 8	585,030; 53.11%	516,525; 46.89%

=== California ===
Origin	Status	Measure	Description (Result of a "yes" vote)	Date	Yes	No
Legislature	Approved	California Proposition 50, Legislator Suspension Amendment	Stop salaries, pension benefits, and other rights and privileges for a state legislator who is suspended through a two-thirds vote in the respective chamber of the state legislature.	Jun 7	5,601,054; 75.59%	1,808,291; 24.41%
Citizens	Approved	California Proposition 51, Public School Facility Bonds	Issue $9 billion in bonds to fund improvement and construction of school facilities for K-12 schools and community colleges.	Nov 8	7,516,142; 55.18%	6,104,294; 44.82%
Citizens	Approved	California Proposition 52, Continued Hospital Fee Revenue Dedicated to Medi-Cal Unless Voters Approve Changes	Require voter approval to change the dedicated use of certain fees from hospitals used to draw matching federal money and fund Medi-Cal services. A "yes" vote also supported continuing the hospital fee program beyond January 1, 2018, and requiring a two-thirds majority vote of the California Legislature to end the program.	Nov 8	9,427,714; 70.07%	4,026,710; 29.93%
Citizens	Failed	California Proposition 53, Voter Approval Requirement for Revenue Bonds above $2 Billion	Require voter approval before the state could issue more than $2 billion in public infrastructure bonds that would require an increase in taxes or fees for repayment.	Nov 8	6,508,909; 49.42%	6,660,555; 50.58%
Citizens	Approved	California Proposition 54, Public Display of Legislative Bills Prior to Vote	Prohibit the legislature from passing any bill until it has been in print and published on the Internet for 72 hours prior to the vote.	Nov 8	8,607,266; 65.37%	4,559,903; 34.63%
Citizens	Approved	California Proposition 55, Extension of the Proposition 30 Income Tax Increase	Extend the personal income tax increases on incomes over $250,000 approved in 2012 for 12 years in order to fund education and healthcare.	Nov 8	8,594,273; 63.27%	4,988,329; 36.73%
Citizens	Approved	California Proposition 56, Tobacco Tax Increase	Increase the cigarette tax by $2.00 per pack, with equivalent increases on other tobacco products and electronic cigarettes.	Nov 8	8,980,448; 64.43%	4,957,994; 35.57%
Citizens	Approved	California Proposition 57, Parole for Non-Violent Criminals and Juvenile Court Trial Requirements	Increase parole and good behavior opportunities for felons convicted of nonviolent crimes and allowing judges, not prosecutors, to decide whether to try certain juveniles as adults in court.	Nov 8	8,790,723; 64.46%	4,847,354; 35.54%
Legislature	Approved	California Proposition 58, Non-English Languages Allowed in Public Education	Repeal most of the 1998 Proposition 227, the "English in Public Schools" Initiative, thus effectively allowing non-English languages to be used in public educational instruction.	Nov 8	9,994,454; 73.52%	3,598,855; 26.48%
Advisory Question	Approved	California Proposition 59, Overturn of Citizens United Act Advisory Question	Advise the state's elected officials to use their authority to overturn the Citizens United v. Federal Election Commission decision, potentially through an amendment to the U.S. Constitution.	Nov 8	6,845,943; 53.18%	6,027,084; 46.82%
Citizens	Failed	California Proposition 60, Condoms in Pornographic Films	Require the use of condoms and other protective measures during the filming of pornographic films, as well as requiring pornography producers to pay for certain health requirements and checkups.	Nov 8	6,168,388; 46.33%	7,146,039; 53.67%
Citizens	Failed	California Proposition 61, Drug Price Standards Initiative	Regulate drug prices by requiring state agencies to pay no more than the U.S. Department of Veterans Affairs pays for prescription drugs.	Nov 8	6,254,342; 46.80%	7,109,642; 53.20%
Citizens	Failed	California Proposition 62, Abolition of Death Penalty Measure	Abolish the death penalty and making life without the possibility of parole the maximum punishment for murder.	Nov 8	6,361,788; 46.85%	7,218,625; 53.15% (Note: As both Proposition 62 and Proposition 66 related to the death penalty, if both measures were to pass, the measure with the most 'yes' votes would supersede the other.)
Citizens	Approved	California Proposition 63, Background Checks for Ammunition Purchases and Large-Capacity Ammunition Magazine Ban	Prohibit the possession of large-capacity ammunition magazines (more than 10 rounds) and requiring certain individuals to pass a background check in order to purchase ammunition.	Nov 8	8,663,159; 63.08%	5,070,772; 36.92%
Citizens	Approved	California Proposition 64, Marijuana Legalization	Legalize recreational marijuana for persons aged 21 years or older under state law and establishing certain sales and cultivation taxes.	Nov 8	7,979,041; 57.13%	5,987,020; 42.87%
Citizens	Failed	California Proposition 65, Dedication of Revenue from Disposable Bag Sales to Wildlife Conservation Fund	Redirect money collected from the sale of carry-out bags by grocery or other retail stores to a special fund administered by the Wildlife Conservation Board.	Nov 8	6,222,547; 46.10%	7,276,478; 53.90% (Note: As both Proposition 65 and Proposition 67 related to the taxation of plastic bags, if both measures were to pass, the measure with the most 'yes' votes would supersede the other.)
Citizens	Approved	California Proposition 66, Death Penalty Procedures Measure	Change the procedures governing state court appeals and petitions that challenge death penalty convictions and sentences, including requiring the amount of time that legal challenges to death sentences take to a maximum of five years.	Nov 8	6,626,159; 51.13%	6,333,731; 48.87%
Citizens	Approved	California Proposition 67, Plastic Bag Ban Veto Referendum	Uphold the contested legislation banning certain plastic bags that was enacted by the California State Legislature as Senate Bill 270.	Nov 8	7,228,900; 53.27%	6,340,322; 46.73%

=== Colorado ===
Origin	Status	Measure	Description (Result of a "yes" vote)	Date	Yes	No
Legislature	Failed	Colorado Removal of Exception to Slavery Prohibition for Criminals, Amendment T	Support the proposal to remove part of the Colorado Constitution that allows forced, unpaid labor by convicted criminals.	Nov 8	1,280,037; 49.68%	1,296,722; 50.32%
Legislature	Failed	Colorado Property Tax Exemption for Some Possessory Interests, Amendment U	Exempt from taxation possessory interests whose value is $6,000 or less.	Nov 8	1,103,593; 43.85%	1,412,923; 56.15%
Citizens	Failed	Colorado Creation of ColoradoCare System, Amendment 69	Create ColoradoCare, a healthcare payment system designed to finance universal healthcare for Colorado residents partly through an additional 10 percent payroll tax—two thirds paid by employers and one third by employees—providing approximately $25 billion per year in revenue.	Nov 8	568,683; 21.23%	2,109,868; 78.77%
Citizens	Approved	Colorado $12 Minimum Wage, Amendment 70	Raise the minimum wage from $8.31 to $9.30 per hour in 2017 and then increase it 90 cents each year until the wage reaches $12.00 in 2020.	Nov 8	1,517,903; 55.36%	1,224,189; 44.64%
Citizens	Approved	Colorado Amendment 71, 55% Vote Requirement and Signature Distribution Requirement for Constitutional Amendments Measure	Create a signature distribution requirement for citizen-initiated constitutional amendments, requiring signatures to be collected from each of the state's 35 Senate districts, and require a 55% vote for voters to approve constitutional amendments.	Nov 8	1,476,948; 55.69%	1,175,324; 44.31%
Citizens	Failed	Colorado Tobacco Tax Increase, Amendment 72	Support the proposal to raise the tax on cigarettes by $1.75 per pack of 20.	Nov 8	1,286,851; 46.94%	1,454,342; 53.06%
Citizens	Approved	Colorado Proposition 106, Physician-Assisted Death Initiative	Make assisted death legal among patients with a terminal illness who receive a prognosis of death within six months.	Nov 8	1,765,786; 64.87%	956,263; 35.13%
Citizens	Approved	Colorado Presidential Primary Election, Proposition 107	Restore presidential primary elections held before the end of March and make them open in Colorado.	Nov 8	1,701,599; 64.09%	953,246; 35.91%
Citizens	Approved	Colorado Unaffiliated Elector, Proposition 108	Allow unaffiliated electors to vote in the primary election of a major political party without declaring an affiliation with that political party and to permit a political party, in some circumstances, to select candidates by committee or convention, rather than through a primary election.	Nov 8	1,398,577; 53.27%	1,227,117; 46.73%

=== Florida ===
Origin	Status	Measure	Description (Result of a "yes" vote)	Date	Yes	No
Legislature	Approved	Florida Amendment 4, Property Tax Exemptions for Renewable Energy Equipment Measure	Provide tax exemptions for solar power and other renewable energy equipment included in home, commercial, and industrial property values that would otherwise fall under the tangible property tax bracket.	Aug 30	1,975,257; 72.62% (Note: In order for a ballot measure intended to amend the Florida Constitution to pass it must first meet a 60% minimum voter threshold.)	744,891; 27.38%
Citizens	Failed	Florida Amendment 1, Solar Energy Subsidies and Personal Solar Use Measure	Add a section in the state constitution giving residents of Florida the right to own or lease solar energy equipment for personal use while also enacting constitutional protection for any state or local law, ensuring that residents who do not produce solar energy can abstain from subsidizing its production.	Nov 8	4,560,682; 50.79%	4,418,788; 49.21%
Citizens	Approved	Florida Amendment 2, Medical Marijuana Legalization Measure	Legalize medical marijuana for individuals with specific debilitating diseases or comparable debilitating conditions as determined by a licensed state physician.	Nov 8	6,518,919; 71.32%	2,621,845; 28.68%
Legislature	Approved	Florida Amendment 3, Tax Exemptions for Disabled First Responders Measure	Provide property tax exemptions to first responders who have been permanently disabled in the line of duty.	Nov 8	7,495,226; 83.78%	1,451,074; 16.22%
Legislature	Approved	Florida Amendment 5, Property Tax Exemptions for Senior Citizens Measure	Revise existing tax regulations to specify that the value of property owned by senior citizens eligible for the homestead property tax exemption would be determined during the first year in which they apply for the exemption.	Nov 8	6,891,472; 78.30%	1,909,963; 21.70%

=== Georgia ===
Origin	Status	Measure	Description (Result of a "yes" vote)	Date	Yes	No
Legislature	Failed	Georgia Authorization of the State Government to Intervene in Failing Local Schools, Amendment 1	Authorize the state to form an Opportunity School District that would govern certain elementary and secondary schools determined to be "chronically failing."	Nov 8	1,615,780; 40.09%	2,414,401; 59.91%
Legislature	Approved	Georgia Additional Penalties for Sex Crimes to Fund Services for Sexually Exploited Children, Amendment 2	Provide penalties for court cases involving certain sex crimes in order to allocate the generated revenue for the Safe Harbor for Sexually Exploited Children Fund.	Nov 8	3,314,355; 83.30%	664,248; 16.70%
Legislature	Approved	Georgia Replacement of the Judicial Qualifications Commission, Amendment 3	Replace the Judicial Qualifications Commission with a new commission designed and governed by the General Assembly.	Nov 8	2,341,495; 62.50%	1,405,117; 37.50%
Legislature	Approved	Georgia Uses of Revenue from Taxes on Fireworks, Amendment 4	Dedicate revenue from fireworks sales taxes to trauma care, fire protection services, and public safety.	Nov 8	3,205,955; 81.18%	743,103; 18.82%

=== Hawaii ===
Origin	Status	Measure	Description (Result of a "yes" vote)	Date	Yes	No
Legislature	Failed	Hawaii Threshold of Financial Damage Required to Establish the Right to a Trial by Jury, Amendment 1	Increase the threshold value in controversy requirement for jury trials in civil cases at common law to $10,000.	Nov 8	201,198; 46.0%	185,586; 42.4% (Note: In order for a ballot measure amending the Hawaii Constitution to become law, the votes in favor of it must equal or surpass a majority of all votes cast. The percentages listed for the Amendments subsequently do not add up to 100 percent due to there having been ballots cast that had left the Amendment questions blank.)
Legislature	Approved	Hawaii General Fund Revenues Spent On Pension Liabilities and Bond Repayments, Amendment 2	Add bond and pension payments as alternative dispositions of excess general fund revenues.	Nov 8	219,056; 50.10%	157,289; 35.9%

=== Idaho ===
Origin	Status	Measure	Description (Result of a "yes" vote)	Date	Yes	No
Legislature	Approved	Idaho Veto-Proof State Legislative Oversight of Administrative Rules and Regulations, HJR 5	Provide tax exemptions for solar power and other renewable energy equipment included in home, commercial, and industrial property values that would otherwise fall under the tangible property tax bracket.	Nov 8	347,327; 55.52%	278,219; 44.48%

=== Illinois ===
Origin	Status	Measure	Description (Result of a "yes" vote)	Date	Yes	No
Legislature	Approved	Illinois Transportation Taxes and Fees Lockbox Amendment	Prohibit lawmakers from using transportation funds for anything other than their stated purpose.	Nov 8	3,796,654; 79.91% (Note: In order for a legislatively referred constitutional amendment to win in Illinois, it must be approved by at least 60% of those voting on the question or by a majority of those who cast a ballot for any office in that election.)	1,014,461; 21.09%

=== Indiana ===
Origin	Status	Measure	Description (Result of a "yes" vote)	Date	Yes	No
Legislature	Approved	Indiana Right to Hunt and Fish, Public Question 1	Amend the state constitution to include the right to hunt, fish, and harvest wildlife.	Nov 8	1,893,467; 79.37%	492,300; 20.63%

=== Kansas ===
Origin	Status	Measure	Description (Result of a "yes" vote)	Date	Yes	No
Legislature	Approved	Kansas Right to Hunt and Fish, Constitutional Amendment 1	Ensure a constitutional right to hunt, fish, and trap wildlife.	Nov 8	926,970; 81.31%	213,104; 18.69%

=== Louisiana ===
Origin	Status	Measure	Description (Result of a "yes" vote)	Date	Yes	No
Legislature	Approved	Louisiana Appointment and Qualifications of Registrars of Voters, Amendment 1	Require that the qualifications and appointment of each Parish's Registrar of Voters is provided by law by adding language to the state constitution.	Nov 8	1,330,230; 72.62%	501,604; 27.38%
Legislature	Failed	Louisiana Authority of College Boards to Establish Tuition and Fees without Legislative Approval, Amendment 2	Allow college boards to establish tuition and fee amounts for their respective institutions without legislative approval.	Nov 8	783,077; 42.93%	1,040,899; 57.07%
Legislature	Failed	Louisiana Removal of Federal Income Tax Deduction from State Corporate Income Tax Calculation, Amendment 3	Change the language of the state constitution so that federal tax payments cannot be used as a deduction when calculating state corporate income taxes.	Nov 8	790,440; 43.09%	1,009,725; 56.09%
Legislature	Approved	Louisiana Property Tax Exemptions for Widowed Spouses of First Responders and Military Personnel, Amendment 4	Allow the surviving unmarried spouses of first responders or military personnel who died while on active duty to receive certain property tax exemptions.	Nov 8	1,298,339; 71.80%	509,995; 28.20%
Legislature	Approved	Louisiana Transportation Fund and Revenue Allocation, Amendment 5	Establish the Revenue Stabilization Trust Fund to be used for construction projects and transportation infrastructure.	Nov 8	949,805; 53.60%	822,079; 46.40%
Legislature	Failed	Louisiana Use of Restricted Funds to Eliminate Future Deficits upon Projected Revenue Reduction, Amendment 6	Implement procedures that would allow the government to use current year funds to alleviate projected deficits.	Nov 8	743,238; 42.17%	1,019,120; 57.83%

=== Maine ===
Origin	Status	Measure	Description (Result of a "yes" vote)	Date	Yes	No
Citizens	Approved	Maine Marijuana Legalization, Question 1	Legalize recreational marijuana for adults over the age of 21.	Nov 8	381,768; 50.26%	377,773; 49.74%
Citizens	Approved	Maine Tax on Incomes Exceeding $200,000 for Public Education, Question 2	Approve an additional 3 percent surcharge on the portion of any household income exceeding $200,000 per year. Revenue would be earmarked to fund public education.	Nov 8	383,428; 50.63%	373,848; 49.37%
Citizens	Failed	Maine Background Checks for Gun Sales, Question 3	Require background checks before a gun sale or transfer between people who are not licensed firearm dealers.	Nov 8	366,770; 48.20%	394,157; 51.80%
Citizens	Approved	Maine Minimum Wage Increase, Question 4	Increase the state's minimum wage to $12 by 2020, thereafter adjusting the minimum wage with fluctuations in the consumer price index.	Nov 8	420,892; 55.50%	337,486; 44.50%
Citizens	Approved	Maine Question 5, Ranked-Choice Voting Initiative	Adopt ranked-choice voting for congressional, state legislative, and gubernatorial elections.	Nov 8	388,273; 52.12%	356,621; 47.88%
Bond Issue	Approved	Maine Transportation Bond, Question 6	Issue $100 million in bonds for transportation projects.	Nov 8	457,864; 61.22%	290,062; 38.78%

=== Maryland ===
Origin	Status	Measure	Description (Result of a "yes" vote)	Date	Yes	No
Legislature	Approved	Maryland Appointments to Fill Vacancies Required to Preserve Political Party Affiliation, Question 1	Require that political party affiliations be preserved when appointments are made to fill vacancies in the offices of attorney general and comptroller, as determined by the central committee of the relevant political party.	Nov 8	1,748,886; 72.62%	659,517; 27.38%

=== Massachusetts ===
Origin	Status	Measure	Description (Result of a "yes" vote)	Date	Yes	No
Citizens	Failed	Massachusetts Question 1, Authorization of a Second Slots Location	Grant the Massachusetts Gaming Commission the ability to issue an additional slots license.	Nov 8	1,240,877; 39.26%	1,919,893; 60.74%
Citizens	Failed	Massachusetts Question 2, Annual Charter School Expansion Initiative	Allow the Massachusetts Board of Elementary and Secondary Education to approve up to 12 new charter schools or enrollment expansions in existing charter schools each year, beginning January 1, 2017.	Nov 8	1,243,665; 38.04%	2,025,840; 61.96%
Citizens	Approved	Massachusetts Question 3, Minimum Size Requirements for Farm Animal Containment	Prohibit the sale of eggs, veal, or pork of a farm animal confined in spaces that prevent the animal from lying down, standing up, extending its limbs, or turning around.	Nov 8	2,530,143; 77.64%	728,654; 22.36%
Citizens	Approved	Massachusetts Question 4, Marijuana Legalization	Legalize marijuana but regulate it in ways similar to alcoholic beverages.	Nov 8	1,769,328; 53.66%	1,528,219; 46.34%

=== Minnesota ===
Origin	Status	Measure	Description (Result of a "yes" vote)	Date	Yes	No
Legisalture	Approved	Minnesota Amendment 1, Create Board to Set State Legislative Salaries Measure	Create a bi-partisan board to set the salaries of state legislators with half the members appointed by the governor and half the members appointed by chief justice and with members split between the two political parties with the most legislators.	Nov 8	2,265,835; 76.30% (Note: In order for a ballot measure amending the Minnesota Constitution to become law, the votes in favor of it must equal or surpass a majority of all votes cast. The percentage listed for the Amendment subsequently does not add up to 100 percent due to there having been cast ballots that had left the Amendment question blank.)	536,272; 18.10%

=== Missouri ===
Origin	Status	Measure	Description (Result of a "yes" vote)	Date	Yes	No
Automatic Referral	Approved	Missouri Sales Tax for Parks and Conservation, Amendment 1	Renew the existing sales and use tax of 0.1 percent for 10 years to fund state parks and soil and water conservation.	Nov 8	2,187,773; 79.88%	551,117; 20.12%
Citizens	Approved	Missouri State and Judicial Campaign Contribution Limits, Constitutional Amendment 2	Establish limits on campaign contributions to candidates for state or judicial office.	Nov 8	1,894,870; 69.95%	814,016; 30.35%
Citizens	Failed	Missouri 60 Cent Cigarette Tax, Constitutional Amendment 3	Increase the taxes on cigarette packs from 17 cents to 77 cents by 2020 and impose an additional fee on tobacco wholesalers at an initial rate of 67 cents per pack.	Nov 8	1,120,389; 40.45%	1,649,723; 59.55%
Citizens	Approved	Missouri Prohibition on Extending Sales Tax to Previously Untaxed Services, Constitutional Amendment 4	Prohibit a new state sales or use tax on any service or activity that was not subject to a sales or use tax as of January 1, 2015.	Nov 8	1,533,909; 56.98%	1,158,291; 43.02%
Legislature	Approved	Missouri Voter ID Requirement, Constitutional Amendment 6	Allow the state government to require the presentation of voter IDs at public elections in order to prove national and state citizenship.	Nov 8	1,712,274; 63.01%	1,005,234; 36.99%
Citizens	Failed	Missouri 23 Cent Cigarette Tax, Proposition A	Increase taxes on cigarettes by 23 cents per pack by 2021 and to add an additional 5 percent sales tax for other tobacco products.	Nov 8	1,223,251; 44.81%	1,506,644; 55.19%

=== Montana ===
Origin	Status	Measure	Description (Result of a "yes" vote)	Date	Yes	No
Citizens	Approved	Montana Marsy's Law Crime Victims Rights Initiative, CI-116	Add a section to the Montana Constitution that would give crime victims specific rights to ensure their interests are respected and protected under the law.	Nov 8	325,934; 66.09%	167,261; 33.91%
Citizens	Failed	Montana I-177, Animal Trap Restrictions on Public Land Initiative	Prohibit individuals from using animal traps and snares on state public lands.	Nov 8	185,908; 37.30%	312,455; 62.70%
Citizens	Failed	Montana Bonds to Fund Biomedical Research Authority, I-181	Create $20 million per year in state bonds for ten years to establish and fund the Montana Biomedical Research Authority.	Nov 8	208,883; 42.67%	280,604; 57.33%
Citizens	Approved	Montana Medical Marijuana Initiative, I-182	Repeal the three-patient limit for medical marijuana providers.	Nov 8	291,334; 57.87%	212,089; 42.13%

=== Nebraska ===
Origin	Status	Measure	Description (Result of a "yes" vote)	Date	Yes	No
Veto Referendum	Failed	Nebraska Referendum 426, Death Penalty Measure	Retain LB 268 and uphold the ban on the death penalty.	Nov 8	320,719; 39.96%	494,151; 60.64%

=== Nevada ===
Origin	Status	Measure	Description (Result of a "yes" vote)	Date	Yes	No
Citizens	Approved	Nevada Background Checks for Gun Purchases, Question 1	Require firearm transfers to go through a licensed gun dealer. Certain transfers, including temporary transfers and those between immediate family members, would be exempted.	Nov 8	558,631; 50.45%	548,732; 49.55%
Citizens	Approved	Nevada Marijuana Legalization, Question 2	Legalize the recreational use of one ounce or less of marijuana by individuals 21 and over.	Nov 8	602,463; 54.47%	503,644; 45.53%
Citizens	Approved	Nevada Legislature to Minimize Regulations on the Energy Market and Eliminate Legal Energy Monopolies, Question 3	Establish a constitutional amendment to require the Nevada Legislature to establish "an open, competitive retail electric energy market," reduce energy market regulations, and prohibit energy monopolies.	Nov 8	783,185; 72.36% (Note: In Nevada, citizen-initiated constitutional amendments need to be approved in two even-numbered election years, meaning that Question 3 needed to be approved in 2016 and again in 2018 to amend the Nevada Constitution.)	299,183; 27.64%
Citizens	Approved	Nevada Medical Equipment Sales Tax Exemption, Question 4	Establish a constitutional amendment to require the Nevada Legislature to exempt from sales and use tax durable medical equipment, oxygen delivery equipment, and mobility enhancing equipment prescribed for human use by a licensed health care provider.	Nov 8	768,871; 71.80% (Note: In Nevada, citizen-initiated constitutional amendments need to be approved in two even-numbered election years, meaning that Question 4 needed to be approved in 2016 and again in 2018 to amend the Nevada Constitution.)	301,963; 28.2%

=== New Jersey ===
Origin	Status	Measure	Description (Result of a "yes" vote)	Date	Yes	No
Legislature	Failed	New Jersey Allowance for Casinos in Two Additional Counties, Public Question 1	Allow the state legislature to pass laws allowing for two additional northern counties to each have one new casino, thereby ending four decades of casinos only being permitted in Atlantic City.	Nov 8	707,064; 22.76%	2,400,081; 77.24%
Legislative	Approved	New Jersey Dedication of All Gas Tax Revenue to Transportation, Public Question 2	Dedicate all revenue from gas taxes to transportation projects.	Nov 8	1,660,021; 54.51%	1,385,321; 45.49%

=== New Mexico ===
Origin	Status	Measure	Description (Result of a "yes" vote)	Date	Yes	No
Legislature	Approved	New Mexico Changes in Regulations Governing Bail, Constitutional Amendment 1	Allow courts to deny bail to a defendant charged with a felony if a prosecutor shows evidence that the defendant poses a threat to the public, while also providing that a defendant cannot be denied bail because of a financial inability to post a bond.	Nov 8	616,887; 87.23%	90,293; 12.77%
Bond Issue	Approved	New Mexico Senior Citizen Facilities, Bond Question A	Issue no more than $15,440,000 in general obligation bonds to fund specific senior citizen facility improvement, construction, and equipment acquisition projects.	Nov 8	475,498; 68.53%	218,386; 31.47%
Bond Issue	Approved	New Mexico Capital Expenditures for Libraries, Bond Question B	Issue no more than $10,167,000 in general obligation bonds for academic, public school, tribal, and public library resource acquisitions.	Nov 8	449,220; 64.78%	244,213; 35.22%
Bond Issue	Approved	New Mexico Capital Expenditures for Higher, Special, and Tribal Education, Bond Question C	Issue no more than $142,356,000 in general obligation bonds for higher education, special schools, and tribal schools capital improvements and acquisitions.	Nov 8	442,149; 63.35%	255,835; 36.65%
Bond Issue	Approved	New Mexico Public Safety Facilities, Bond Question D	Issue no more than $18,196,000 in general obligation bonds for state police, public safety communications and statewide national guard facilities improvements and acquisitions.	Nov 8	458,852; 66.16%	234,722; 33.84%

=== North Carolina ===
Origin	Status	Measure	Description (Result of a "yes" vote)	Date	Yes	No
Bond Issue	Approved	North Carolina Connect NC Public Improvement Bond	Issue $2 billion in bonds for economic development and infrastructure projects in 76 counties.	Mar 15	1,420,072; 65.58%	745,295; 34.42%

=== North Dakota ===
Origin	Status	Measure	Description (Result of a "yes" vote)	Date	Yes	No
Veto referendum	Failed	North Dakota Corporate Dairy and Swine Farming Referendum, Referred Measure 1	Uphold Senate Bill 2351, which was designed to allow domestic corporations and limited liability companies to own and operate dairy farms and swine production facilities on no more than 640 acres of land.	Jun 14	32,045; 24.27%	99,976; 75.73%
Legislature	Approved	North Dakota Residency Requirement for State Legislators, Constitutional Measure 1	Require that state legislators remain residents of the legislative districts that they serve in for the entirety of their term, and starting at least 30 days prior to the election.	Nov 8	282,231; 86.11%	45,542; 13.89%
Legislature	Approved	North Dakota Allocation of Oil Extraction Taxes, Constitutional Measure 2	Authorize the legislature to allocate excess revenues from oil extraction taxes from the foundation aid stabilization fund for education purposes.	Nov 8	209,651; 64.30%	116,418; 35.70%
Citizens	Approved	North Dakota Marsy's Law Crime Victim Rights, Initiated Constitutional Measure 3	Incorporate existing state statutes related to crime victims' rights into the state constitution.	Nov 8	207,248; 62.03%	126,884; 37.97%
Citizens	Failed	North Dakota Tobacco Tax Increase, Initiated Statutory Measure 4	Increase taxes on tobacco products and using the generated tax revenue to fund veteran services and health services.	Nov 8	130,508; 38.35%	209,832; 61.65%
Citizens	Approved	North Dakota Medical Marijuana Legalization, Initiated Statutory Measure 5	Legalize the use of medical marijuana to treat defined debilitating medical conditions, such as cancer, AIDS, hepatitis C, ALS, glaucoma, and epilepsy, and developing certain procedures for regulating medical marijuana growing, dispensing, and usage.	Nov 8	216,042; 63.79%	122,615; 36.21%

=== Oklahoma ===
Origin	Status	Measure	Description (Result of a "yes" vote)	Date	Yes	No
Legislature	Approved	Oklahoma State Question 776, Allow State to Impose Death Penalty Amendment	Amend the Oklahoma Constitution to guarantee the state’s power to impose capital punishment and set methods of execution.	Nov 8	942,504; 66.36%	477,717; 33.64%
Legislature	Failed	Oklahoma Right to Farm Amendment, State Question 777	Amend the state constitution to include the right to farm and ranch.	Nov 8	569,668; 39.71%	864,827; 60.29%
Citizens	Failed	Oklahoma One Percent Sales Tax, State Question 779	Increase the state sales tax by one percentage point to generate a predicted $615 million per year for education funding.	Nov 8	583,429; 40.26%	853,573; 59.40%
Citizens	Approved	Oklahoma Reclassification of Some Drug and Property Crimes as Misdemeanors, State Question 780	Reclassify certain property offenses and simple drug possession as misdemeanor crimes.	Nov 8	831,123; 58.23%	596,070; 41.77%
Citizens	Approved	Oklahoma Rehabilitative Programs Fund Initiative, State Question 781	Use money saved by reclassifying certain property and drug crimes as misdemeanors, as outlined in the Criminal Justice System Reform Initiative, State Question 780, to fund rehabilitative programs, including substance abuse and mental health treatment programs.	Nov 8	795,475; 56.22% (Note: In order for Question 781 to go into effect, Quetion 780 must also be passed with majority approval.)	619,580; 43.78%
Legislature	Failed	Oklahoma State Question 790, Repeal of Ban on Public Funding for Religious Institutions Amendment	Repeal the constitutional provision that prohibits public money or property from being used, directly or indirectly, to support any religious organization, religious leader, or sectarian institution.	Nov 8	607,482; 42.88%	809,254; 57.12%
Citizens	Approved	Oklahoma Regulations Governing the Sale of Wine and Beer, State Question 792	Change the laws governing alcohol sales and distribution in the state, including provisions allowing grocery stores and convenience stores to sell full-strength beer and wine seven days a week.	Nov 8	939,848; 65.62%	492,422; 34.38%

=== Oregon ===
Origin	Status	Measure	Description (Result of a "yes" vote)	Date	Yes	No
Legislature	Failed	Oregon Measure 94, Elimination of Mandatory Judicial Retirement Age Amendment	Remove the mandatory retirement age for judges, which was 75 years old going into the election.	Nov 8	699,689; 36.95%	1,194,167; 63.05%
Legislature	Approved	Oregon Measure 95, Public University Diversification of Investments Amendment	Allow public state universities to invest in equities.	Nov 8	1,301,183; 70.41%	546,919; 29.59%
Legislature	Approved	Oregon Measure 96, Portion of Lottery Proceeds for Support of Veterans Amendment	Devote 1.5 percent of state lottery net proceeds toward veterans' services.	Nov 8	1,611,367; 83.76%	312,526; 16.24%
Citizens	Failed	Oregon Measure 97, Business Tax Increase Initiative	Remove the cap on the corporate gross sales tax, also known as the "minimum tax," and establish a 2.5 percent tax on gross sales that exceed $25 million.	Nov 8	808,310; 40.97%	1,164,658; 59.03%
Citizens	Approved	Oregon Measure 98, State Funding for Dropout Prevention and College Readiness Initiative	Require the Oregon Legislature to fund dropout-prevention and career and college readiness programs in Oregon high schools.	Nov 8	1,260,163; 65.96%	650,347; 34.04%
Citizens	Approved	Oregon Measure 99, Outdoor School Lottery Fund Initiative	Create an "Outdoor School Education Fund," sourced from state lottery proceeds, to support outdoor school programs.	Nov 8	1,287,095; 67.11%	630,735; 32.89%
Citizens	Approved	Oregon Measure 100, Wildlife Trafficking Prevention Initiative	Prohibit the sale of products and parts of 12 types of animals in Oregon: rhino, cheetah, tiger, sea turtle, lion, elephant, whale, shark, pangolin, jaguar, ray, and leopard.	Nov 8	1,306,213; 69.45%	574,631; 30.55%

=== Pennsylvania ===
Origin	Status	Measure	Description (Result of a "yes" vote)	Date	Yes	No
Legislature	Approved	Pennsylvania Philadelphia Traffic Court Abolition Amendment, Proposed Constitutional Amendment 2	Abolish the traffic court in the City of Philadelphia.	Apr 26	1,448,141; 59.67%	978,618; 40.33%
Legislature	Approved	Pennsylvania Judicial Retirement Age Amendment	Change the mandatory retirement age from 70 to 75 for Supreme Court justices, judges, and justices of the peace.	Nov 8	2,541,601; 51.09%	2,432,670; 48.91%

=== Rhode Island ===
Origin	Status	Measure	Description (Result of a "yes" vote)	Date	Yes	No
Legislature	Approved	Rhode Island Twin River Casino in Tiverton, Question 1	Establish a gaming facility in the town of Tiverton.	Nov 8	234,327; 54.95%	192,107; 45.05%
Legislature	Approved	Rhode Island Ethics Commission Amendment, Question 2	Provide the Rhode Island Ethics Commission with authority to investigate alleged misconduct regarding legislative activities.	Nov 8	319,765; 78.11%	89,593; 21.89%
Bond Issue	Approved	Rhode Island Veterans Home Bonds, Question 3	Issue $27,000,000 in general obligation bonds to fund construction for a new Veterans Home and maintenance of existing facilities.	Nov 8	356,337; 83.89%	68,406; 16.11%
Bond Issue	Approved	Rhode Island Higher Education Bonds, Question 4	Issue $45,500,000 in general obligation bonds to invest in higher education related projects.	Nov 8	248,708; 59.48%	169,408; 40.52%
Bond Issue	Approved	Rhode Island Port Infrastructure Bonds, Question 5	Issue $70,000,000 in general obligation bonds to fund port infrastructure projects.	Nov 8	264,056; 63.29%	153,132; 36.71%
Bond Issue	Approved	Rhode Island Environmental and Recreational Improvement Bonds, Question 6	Issue $35,000,000 in general obligation bonds for environmental and recreational purposes.	Nov 8	284,408; 67.62%	136,205; 32.38%
Bond Issue	Approved	Rhode Island Affordable Housing Bonds, Question 7	Issue $50,000,000 in general obligation bonds to fund affordable housing and urban revitalization.	Nov 8	245,135; 58.04%	177,218; 41.96%

=== South Dakota ===
Origin	Status	Measure	Description (Result of a "yes" vote)	Date	Yes	No
Legislature	Approved	South Dakota Governance of Technical Education Institutes, Constitutional Amendment R	Allow the South Dakota Legislature to determine a separate entity, board or procedure to run technical schools and preventing the South Dakota Board of Regents from running such schools.	Nov 8	178,209; 50.61%	173,945; 49.39%
Citizens	Approved	South Dakota Marsy's Law Crime Victim Rights, Constitutional Amendment S	Expand the rights of crime victims by adding "Mary's Law".	Nov 8	215,565; 59.61%	146,084; 40.39%
Citizens	Failed	South Dakota Redistricting Commission, Constitutional Amendment T	Create an independent redistricting commission.	Nov 8	149,942; 42.97%	198,982; 57.03%
Citizens	Failed	South Dakota Limit on Statutory Interest Rates for Loans, Constitutional Amendment U	Limit the ability to set statutory interest rates for loans.	Nov 8	130,627; 36.74%	224,876; 63.26%
Citizens	Failed	South Dakota Amendment V, Top-Two Primary Amendment	Establish nonpartisan elections.	Nov 8	157,870; 44.51%	196,781; 55.49%
Veto Referendum	Failed	South Dakota Independent Candidates Election Law Referendum, Referred Law 19	Support Senate Bill 69 (SB 69), a statute changing election laws regarding independent candidates, minor political parties, and signature collection numbers and due dates.	Nov 8	98,657; 28.95%	242,113; 71.05%
Veto Referendum	Failed	South Dakota Decreased Youth Minimum Wage Veto Referendum, Referred Law 20	Support Senate Bill 177 (SB 177), a law decreasing the minimum wage for workers under age 18 from $8.50 to $7.50.	Nov 8	104,185; 28.87%	256,686; 71.13%
Citizens	Approved	South Dakota Payday Lending Initiative, Initiated Measure 21	Place an interest rate cap of 36 percent on short-term loans.	Nov 8	270,312; 75.58%	87,355; 24.42%
Citizens	Approved	South Dakota Revision of State Campaign Finance and Lobbying Laws, Initiated Measure 22	Revise state campaign finance and lobbying laws and creating a publicly funded campaign finance program and an ethics commission.	Nov 8	180,634; 51.63%	169,199; 48.37%
Citizens	Failed	South Dakota Initiated Measure 23, Right for Unions and Organizations to Charge Fees for Services Measure	Give corporate organizations and nonprofit organizations the right to charge a fee for any service provided.	Nov 8	71,250; 20.31%	279,482; 79.69%

=== Utah ===
Origin	Status	Measure	Description (Result of a "yes" vote)	Date	Yes	No
Legislature	Approved	Utah Amendment A, Amend the Oath of Office Measure	Change the oath of office for state officials in Utah to include the word "Utah" (rather than "this state") when referring to the Utah Constitution.	Nov 8	645,523; 65.30%	343,235; 34.70%
Legislature	Approved	Utah Amendment B, Modify School Funds Distribution Measure	Modify certain provisions and language relating to distribution, investment, and expenditure for the State School Fund and the Uniform School Fund.	Nov 8	630,193; 64.10%	353,208; 35.90%
Legislature	Failed	Utah Amendment C, Tax Exemptions for Property Leased By State Measure	Allow the state legislature to exempt tangible personal property leased by the state from property taxes.	Nov 8	426,207; 42.70%	572,785; 57.30%

=== Virginia ===
Origin	Status	Measure	Description (Result of a "yes" vote)	Date	Yes	No
Legislature	Failed	Virginia Right to Work Amendment, Question 1	Add a section to the constitution that would make it illegal for workplaces to require mandatory labor union membership for employees as a condition for employment.	Nov 8	1,743,255; 46.38%	2,015,475; 53.62%
Legislature	Approved	Virginia Property Tax Exemption for Surviving Spouses of Police and Service Personnel Amendment, Question 2	Provide a local option property tax exemption for surviving spouses of first responders killed in the line of duty.	Nov 8	3,031,341; 79.74%	770,134; 20.26%

=== Washington ===
Origin	Status	Measure	Description (Result of a "yes" vote)	Date	Yes	No
Citizens	Failed	Washington Carbon Emission Tax and Sales Tax Reduction, Initiative 732	Impose a carbon emission tax on the sale or use of certain fossil fuels and fossil-fuel-generated electricity.	Nov 8	1,265,123; 40.75%	1,839,414; 59.25%
Citizens	Approved	Washington Advisory Question about the Rights of Corporations and Money as Free Speech, Initiative 735	Urge the Washington state congressional delegation to propose a federal constitutional amendment that reserves constitutional rights for people and not corporations.	Nov 8	1,923,489; 62.86%	1,138,453; 37.18%
Citizens	Approved	Washington Minimum Wage Increase, Initiative 1433	Incrementally raising the state's minimum wage from $9.47 to $13.50 by 2020 and mandating employers to offer paid sick leave.	Nov 8	1,848,583; 57.42%	1,370,907; 42.58%
Citizens	Failed	Washington State-Provided Campaign Financing Funded by a Non-Resident Sales Tax, Initiative 1464	Create a campaign finance system allowing residents to direct state funds, known as "democracy credits," to qualifying candidates, repeal the non-resident sales tax exemption, restrict employment of former public employees and lobbying, and revise campaign finance laws.	Nov 8	1,415,798; 46.29%	1,642,784; 53.71%
Citizens	Approved	Washington Individual Gun Access Prevention by Court Order, Initiative 1491	Authorize courts to issue extreme risk protection orders to remove an individual's access to firearms.	Nov 8	2,234,799; 69.39%	985,658; 30.61%
Citizens	Approved	Washington Increased Penalties for Crimes Against Vulnerable Individuals, Initiative 1501	Increase criminal identity theft penalties, expanding civil liability for consumer fraud targeting seniors and vulnerable individuals, and exempting certain information of vulnerable individuals and in-home caregivers from public disclosure.	Nov 8	2,247,906; 70.64%	934,365; 39.36%
Advisory Question	Failed	Washington Taxation of Stand-Alone Dental Plans, Advisory Vote 14	Support the maintenance of House Bill 2768, advising that the Washington Healthplanfinder should be allowed to levy an assessment to fund operations.	Nov 8	909,701; 30.86%	2,038,321; 69.14%
Advisory Question	Failed	Washington Modifying Tax Exemption Criteria for Alternative Fuel Vehicles, Advisory Vote 15	Support the maintenance of House Bill 2778, thereby advising the limitation of the tax exemption offered for certain alternative fuel vehicles continue.	Nov 8	1,174,345; 40.10%	1,754,489; 59.90%
Legislature	Approved	Washington Advancement of Date for Completion of Redistricting Plan, Senate Joint Resolution No. 8210	Require the state redistricting commission to complete redistricting for state legislative and congressional districts by November 15 of each year ending in a one, which is 46 days earlier than was required.	Nov 8	2,246,030; 77.32%	658,927; 22.68%

=== Wyoming ===
Origin	Status	Measure	Description (Result of a "yes" vote)	Date	Yes	No
Legislature	Approved	Wyoming Investment of Funds in Equities, Constitutional Amendment A	Allow the Wyoming Legislature to invest additional state funds in the stock market.	Nov 8	132,739; 51.30% (Note: In order for a ballot measure amending the Wyoming Constitution to become law, the votes in favor of it must equal or surpass a majority of all votes cast. The percentages listed for the Amendment subsequently does not add up to 100 percent due to there having been ballots cast that had left the Amendment questions blank.)	103,071; 39.80%

== Other jurisdictions ==
=== District of Columbia ===
Origin	Status	Measure	Description (Result of a "yes" vote)	Date	Yes	No
Legislature	Approved	Washington, D.C., Statehood Advisory Question	Advise the Washington D.C. city council to approve the proposal of statehood.	Nov 8	244,134; 85.69%	40,779; 14.31%

== Localities ==
- 2016 Los Angeles County Measure M
- 2016 Fairfax County meals tax referendum
