= 2016 California elections =

- November 8, 2016
- Registered: 19,411,771
- Turnout: 75.27% (▲33.07 pp)

Elections were held in California on November 8, 2016, with primary elections being held on June 7, 2016. In addition to the U.S. presidential race, California voters elected one member to the United States Senate, all of California's seats to the House of Representatives, all of the seats of the State Assembly, and all odd-numbered seats of the State Senate.

Pursuant to Proposition 14 passed in 2010, California uses a nonpartisan blanket primary for almost all races, with the presidential primary races being the notable exception. Under the nonpartisan blanket primary system, all the candidates for the same elected office, regardless of respective political party, run against each other at once during the primary. The candidates receiving the most and second-most votes in the primary election then become the contestants in the general election.

== President of the United States ==
=== Democratic primary ===
2016 Democratic Party's presidential nominating process in California – Summary of results –
Candidate	Popular vote		Estimated delegates		
Candidate	Count	Percentage	Pledged	Unpledged	Total
Hillary Clinton	2,745,302	53.07%	254	66	320
Bernie Sanders	2,381,722	46.04%	221	0	221
Willie Wilson	12,014	0.23%			
Michael Steinberg	10,880	0.21%			
Rocky De La Fuente	8,453	0.16%			
Henry Hewes	7,743	0.15%			
Keith Judd	7,201	0.14%			
Write-in	23	0.00%			
Uncommitted	—N/a			10	10
Total	5,173,338	100%	475	76	551

=== Republican primary ===
California Republican primary, June 7, 2016
Candidate	Votes	Percentage	Actual delegate count		
Candidate	Votes	Percentage	Bound	Unbound	Total
Donald Trump	1,665,135	74.76%	172	0	172
John Kasich (withdrawn)	252,544	11.34%	0	0	0
Ted Cruz (withdrawn)	211,576	9.50%	0	0	0
Ben Carson (withdrawn)	82,259	3.69%	0	0	0
Jim Gilmore (withdrawn)	15,691	0.70%	0	0	0
Write-ins	101	0.00%	0	0	0
Unprojected delegates:			0	0	0
Total:	2,227,306	100.00%	172	0	172
Source: The Green Papers

=== General election ===
2016 U.S. presidential election in California
Party	Candidate	Votes	%
Democratic	Hillary Clinton	8,753,788	61.73%
Republican	Donald Trump	4,483,810	31.62%
Libertarian	Gary Johnson	478,500	3.37%
Green	Jill Stein	278,657	1.96%
Independent	Bernie Sanders (write-in)	79,341	0.56%
Peace and Freedom	Gloria La Riva	66,101	0.47%
Independent	Evan McMullin (write-in)	39,596	0.28%
Independent	Mike Maturen (write-in)	1,316	0.01%
Independent	Laurence Kotlikoff (write-in)	402	0.00%
Independent	Jerry White (write-in)	84	0.00%
Total votes		14,181,595	100.00%

== United States Senate ==
Under California's nonpartisan blanket primary law, passed as California Proposition 14 (2010), all candidates for Senate appear on the ballot, regardless of party. Members of any party may vote for any candidate, with the top two vote getters moving on to the general election. Incumbent Barbara Boxer did not seek re-election, which makes this the first open Senate seat election in 24 years in California.

Primary results
Party	Candidate	Votes	%
Democratic	Kamala Harris	3,000,689	39.9%
Democratic	Loretta Sanchez	1,416,203	18.9%
Republican	Duf Sundheim	584,251	7.8%
Republican	Phil Wyman	352,821	4.7%
Republican	Tom Del Beccaro	323,614	4.3%
Republican	Greg Conlon	230,944	3.1%
Democratic	Steve Stokes	168,805	2.2%
Republican	George C. Yang	112,055	1.5%
Republican	Karen Roseberry	110,557	1.5%
Libertarian	Gail K. Lightfoot	99,761	1.3%
Democratic	Massie Munroe	98,150	1.3%
Green	Pamela Elizondo	95,677	1.3%
Republican	Tom Palzer	93,263	1.2%
Republican	Ron Unz	92,325	1.2%
Republican	Don Krampe	69,635	0.9%
No party preference	Eleanor García	65,084	0.9%
Republican	Jarrell Williamson	64,120	0.9%
Republican	Von Hougo	63,609	0.8%
Democratic	President Cristina Grappo	63,330	0.8%
No party preference	Jerry J. Laws	53,023	0.7%
Libertarian	Mark Matthew Herd	41,344	0.6%
Peace and Freedom	John Thompson Parker	35,998	0.5%
No party preference	Ling Ling Shi	35,196	0.5%
Democratic	Herbert G. Peters	32,638	0.4%
Democratic	Emory Peretz Rodgers	31,485	0.4%
No party preference	Mike Beitiks	31,450	0.4%
No party preference	Clive Grey	29,418	0.4%
No party preference	Jason Hanania	27,715	0.4%
No party preference	Paul Merritt	24,031	0.3%
No party preference	Jason Kraus	19,318	0.3%
No party preference	Don J. Grundmann	15,317	0.2%
No party preference	Scott A. Vineberg	11,843	0.2%
No party preference	Tim Gildersleeve	9,798	0.1%
No party preference	Gar Myers	8,726	0.1%
Republican	Billy Falling (write-in)	87	0.0%
No party preference	Ric M. Llewellyn (write-in)	32	0.0%
Republican	Alexis Stuart (write-in)	10	0.0%
Total votes		7,512,322	100.0%

General election results
Party	Candidate	Votes	%	±%
Democratic	Kamala Harris	7,542,753	61.60%	N/A
Democratic	Loretta Sanchez	4,701,417	38.40%	N/A
Total votes		'12,244,170'	'100.0%'	N/A
Democratic hold				

== Ballot Propositions ==
=== June primary election ===
Since the passage of a law in November 2011, state primary elections may only feature propositions placed on the ballot by the state legislature.

==== Proposition 50 ====
The California Suspension of Legislators Amendment, also known as Proposition 50, would amend the state constitution to require a two-thirds vote in the respective chamber of the state legislature to suspend a state senator or assembly member and also withhold the salaries and benefits of the suspended legislator.

2016 California Prop 50
Choice	Votes	%
For	5,601,054	75.59
Against	1,808,291	24.41
Total	7,409,345	100.00
Source: California Secretary of State

=== November general election ===
The number of propositions in this election was significantly larger than previous elections. The increase has been attributed to the relatively low number of signatures required for ballot placement for this election. The number of signatures required for ballot placement is a percentage of the turnout in the previous election. Since the turnout in the November 2014 elections was low, the number of signatures required for ballot placement in 2016 was 365,880, whereas the typical requirement is well over half a million signatures.

2016 California ballot propositions (November)
Name	Description	Votes				Type
Name	Description	Yes	%	No	%	Type
Proposition 51	Issues $9 billion in bonds to fund improvement and construction of school facilities for K-12 schools and community colleges.	7,516,142	55.18	6,104,294	44.82	Citizen-initiated state statute
Proposition 52	Requires a two-thirds vote in the state legislature to change laws that impose fees on hospitals for purpose of obtaining federal Medi-Cal matching funds.	9,427,714	70.07	4,026,710	29.93	Combined initiated constitutional amendment and state statute
Proposition 53	Requires voter approval before the state could issue more than $2 billion in public infrastructure bonds.	6,508,909	49.42	6,660,555	50.58	Citizen-initiated constitutional amendment
Proposition 54	Prohibits the legislature from passing any bill until it has been in print and published on the internet for 72 hours prior to the vote.	8,607,266	65.37	4,559,903	34.63	Combined initiated constitutional amendment and state statute
Proposition 55	Supports extending the personal income tax increases on incomes over $250,000 approved in 2012 for 12 years in order to fund education and healthcare.	8,594,273	63.27	4,988,329	36.73	Citizen-initiated constitutional amendment
Proposition 56	Increases the cigarette tax by $2 per pack with equivalent increases on other tobacco products and electronic cigarettes containing nicotine.	8,980,448	64.43	4,957,994	35.57	Citizen-initiated constitutional amendment
Proposition 57	Increases access to parole for people convicted of nonviolent felonies and modifies how juvenile defendants can be tried as adults.	8,790,723	64.46	4,847,354	35.54	Combined initiated constitutional amendment and state statute
Proposition 58	Repeals most of the Proposition 227 (1998), thus effectively allowing non-English languages to be used in public educational instruction.	9,994,454	73.52	4,847,354	26.48	Legislatively referred state statute
Proposition 59	Asks voters if they want California to work towards overturning the Citizens United ruling.	6,845,943	53.18	6,027,084	46.82	Advisory question
Proposition 60	Mandates the use of condoms in pornographic films.	6,168,388	46.33	7,146,039	53.67	Citizen-initiated state statute
Proposition 61	Regulates drug prices by requiring state agencies to pay no more than the Department of Veterans Affairs pays for prescription drugs.	6,254,342	46.80	7,109,642	53.20	Citizen-initiated state statute
Proposition 62	Repeals the death penalty and replaces it with life imprisonment and forced labor without possibility of parole.	6,361,788	46.85	7,218,625	53.15	Citizen-initiated state statute
Proposition 63	Supports prohibiting the possession of large-capacity ammunition magazines (more than 10 rounds) and requiring certain individuals to pass a background check in order to purchase ammunition.	8,663,159	63.08	5,070,772	36.92	Citizen-initiated state statute
Proposition 64	Legalizes recreational marijuana for persons aged 21 and older in the state.	7,979,041	57.13	5,987,020	42.87	Citizen-initiated state statute
Proposition 65	Supports redirecting money collected from the sale of carry-out bags by grocery or other retail stores to a special fund administered by the Wildlife Conservation Board.	6,222,547	46.10	7,276,478	53.90	Citizen-initiated state statute
Proposition 66	Limits death penalty appeals and length of time for death penalty review, and invalidates Proposition 62 if passed by a larger proportion of the popular vote.	6,626,159	51.13	6,333,731	48.87	Citizen-initiated state statute
Proposition 67	Supports upholding the contested legislation banning certain plastic bags that was enacted by the state legislature as Senate Bill 270.	7,228,900	53.27	6,340,322	46.73	Veto Referendum
Source: California Secretary of State
