= 2012 California Proposition 29 =

Proposition 29
- June 5, 2012
- Additional Tax on Cigarettes for Cancer Research

Results
Choice	Votes	%
Yes	2,568,715	49.77%
No	2,592,791	50.23%
Total votes	5,161,506	100.00%
County results
For
70–80%
60–70%
50–60%
Against
70–80%
60–70%
50–60%

Proposition 29, the California Cancer Research Act, is a California ballot measure that was defeated by California voters at the statewide election on June 5, 2012.

The measure would have placed a $1 excise on tobacco products into a protected fund to finance medical research on smoking-related illnesses, strengthen California’s smoking prevention and cessation programs, and enforce the state’s existing tobacco laws.

The independent California Legislative Analyst's Office projected that the measure would have generated approximately $855 million in first year, declining slightly but predictably (about 3% annually due to decrease in the number of smokers) every year thereafter.

The measure would have created a nine-member committee charged with administering direct revenues. This oversight committee was to be composed of cancer-research medical professionals, University of California Chancellors, and representatives of national disease advocacy groups. The measure restricted administration costs to no more than 2% of its direct tax revenues.

The California Cancer Research Act was widely supported by cancer advocates, including cancer survivor Lance Armstrong and the American Cancer Society.

The measure failed by a small margin of .4 percentage points. Later, in 2016, the cigarette tax was increased by the successful passage of California Proposition 56.

== Detail ==
=== How CCRA revenue would have been spent ===
According to the independent California Legislative Analyst's Office, revenue raised by the measure would have been spent as follows:

- Approximately $75 million annually: Maintaining existing tobacco tax revenue streams to ensure that the California Proposition 99 (1988), California Proposition 10 (1998), General Fund and Breast Cancer programs funded by existing tobacco taxes are not negatively impacted by the excise tax increase;
- 60% (approximately $468 million annually): Research of cancer and tobacco-related disease "for the purpose of grants and loans to support research into the prevention, early detection, treatments, complementary treatments and potential cures of lung cancer and other types of cancer, cardiovascular disease, emphysema and other tobacco related diseases, including but not limited to coronary heart disease, and chronic obstructive lung disease";
- 15% (approximately $117 million annually): Facilities and capital equipment for research "for the purposes of grants and loans to provide facilities, including but not limited to those building, building leases and capital equipment as may be found necessary and appropriate by the Committee, to further biomedical, epidemiological, behavioral, health services, and other research whose primary focus is to identify and refine promising prevention, early detection, treatments, complementary treatments, rehabilitation and potential cures of lung cancer and other types of cancer, cardiovascular disease, emphysema and other tobacco related diseases";
- 20% (approximately $156 million annually): Tobacco prevention and cessation to the state’s existing tobacco control program. These funds would be divided between the California Department of Public Health (80%) and the California Department of Education (20%) for their existing programs to prevent and reduce the use of tobacco.
- 3% (approximately $23 million annually): Tobacco law enforcement "to support law enforcement efforts to reduce cigarette smuggling, tobacco tax evasion, and counterfeit tobacco products, to reduce illegal sales of tobacco products to minors, and to enforce legal settlement provisions and conduct law enforcement training and technical assistance activities for tobacco related statues".
- No more than 2% (approximately $16 million annually): Administration.

=== Oversight ===
The measure would have created a 9-member governing committee charged with administering the fund. The California Cancer Research Act Oversight Committee was to be composed of:

- 3 University of California chancellors;
- 3 "selected from among Cancer Center Directors of National Cancer Institute designated cancer centers located within the State of California" (appointed by the California Governor)
- 1 "affiliated with a California Academic Medical Center who is a practicing physician with expertise in the prevention, treatment or research of cardiovascular disease" (appointed by the California Governor)
- 2 "selected from among California representatives of California or national disease advocacy groups whose focus is tobacco-related illness, at least one of whom shall be a person who has been treated for a tobacco related illness." (appointed by Director of California Department of Public Health)
- A Committee to establish a peer review process for selection of grants modeled on the process used by the National Institutes of Health.

== Ballot qualification ==
The California Secretary of State confirmed that The California Cancer Research Act had qualified for California’s next statewide ballot on August 24, 2010, after its supporting coalition submitted 633,453 voter signatures for verification in June 2010. To qualify, the measure required 433,971 signatures, or more.

== Election results ==
Tax on Cigarettes for Cancer Research
Choice	Votes	%
For	2,568,715	49.77
Against	2,592,791	50.23
Total	5,161,506	100.00
Registered voters/turnout	23,713,027	–

== See also ==
- Tobacco in the United States
- California Proposition 10 (1998)
- California Proposition 56 (2016)
