= California Proposition 99 =

California Proposition 99 can refer to:

- California Proposition 99 (1988), ballot proposition for adding a tax on tobacco
- California Proposition 99 (2008), ballot proposition for limiting certain uses of eminent domain
