= California Proposition 56 =

California Proposition 56 may refer to:

- California Proposition 56 (2004)
- California Proposition 56 (2016)
