= First 5 Los Angeles =

- official logo

Agency overview
- Formed: November 1998; 27 years ago
- Type: Local public authority
- Jurisdiction: Los Angeles County
- Headquarters: 750 N. Alameda St., Suite 300 Los Angeles, CA 90012
- Annual budget: $194.3 million USD (2013-2014)
- Agency executives: Kim Belshe, Executive Director; John Wagner, Sr. Vice President
- Parent agency: First 5 California Children and Families Act
- Website: first5la.org

First 5 Los Angeles is a nonprofit child-advocacy organization that is part of the First 5 California Children and Families Act.

== History ==
First 5 California was created in November 1998 when California voters passed Proposition 10 to invest tobacco tax revenues in programs that would help improve the lives of children in California. Spearheaded by Hollywood producer and political activist Rob Reiner, who acted as the commission's first chairman in 1999 under former Governor Gray Davis, First 5 California was created to use tobacco tax revenues to fund health, safety and early education programs for children age prenatal to 5 years old in California. In the 12 years subsequent to its creation, First 5 LA had invested more than one billion dollars from tobacco tax revenues into grants and programs that benefit the children of Los Angeles County.

== Mission ==
First 5 LA aims to create programs and services for children age prenatal to five. The mission is to increase the number of Los Angeles County children ages 0 to 5 who are physically and emotionally healthy, ready to learn, and safe from harm.

== Programs ==
Programs are centered around child, parent/caretaker, and teacher to improve early childhood outcomes in the areas of health and nutrition, early literacy and language development, quality child care, and smoking cessation.

== Funding ==
Proposition 10 established a 50 cent-per-pack tax on tobacco products towards the healthy development of California's children from prenatal to age five. Declining birth and smoking rates is causing First 5 LA's revenue stream to decrease. First 5 faces decreasing funding due to declining sales of tobacco products and increased administrative fees assessed by the State Board of Equalization for the collection of tobacco taxes. Additional funding declines are fore coming due to state cutbacks. Eighty percent of the commission's resources is divided among California's 58 counties, to be spent according to local needs and priorities.

=== Grants and contracts ===
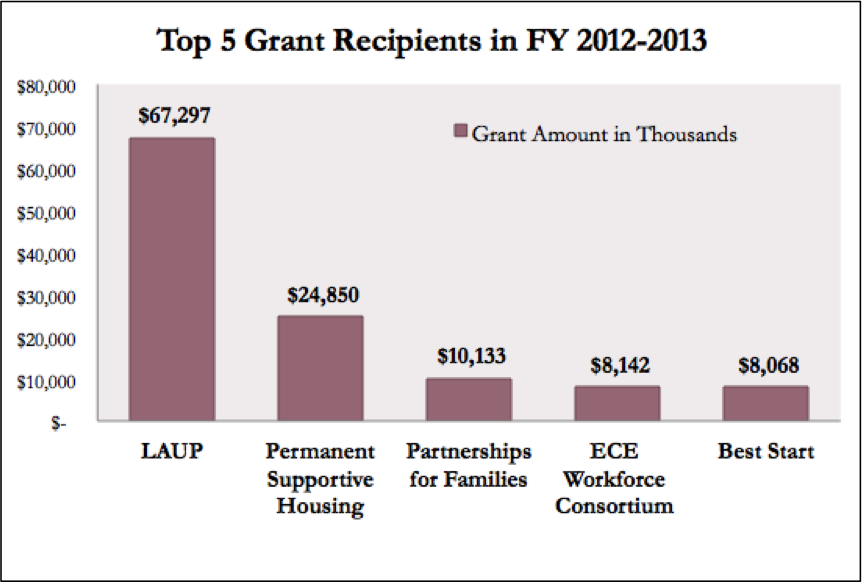
First 5 LA Top 5 Grant Recipients 2012-2013

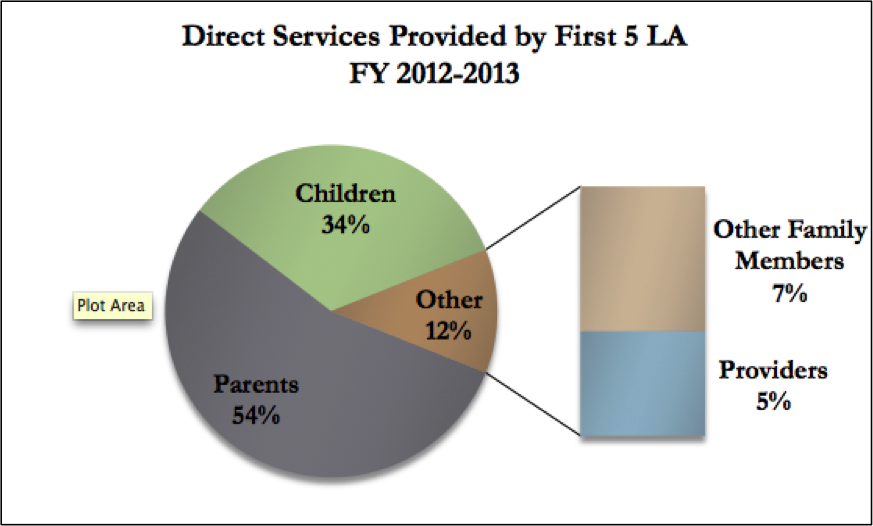
Direct Services Provided by First 5 LA 2012-2013

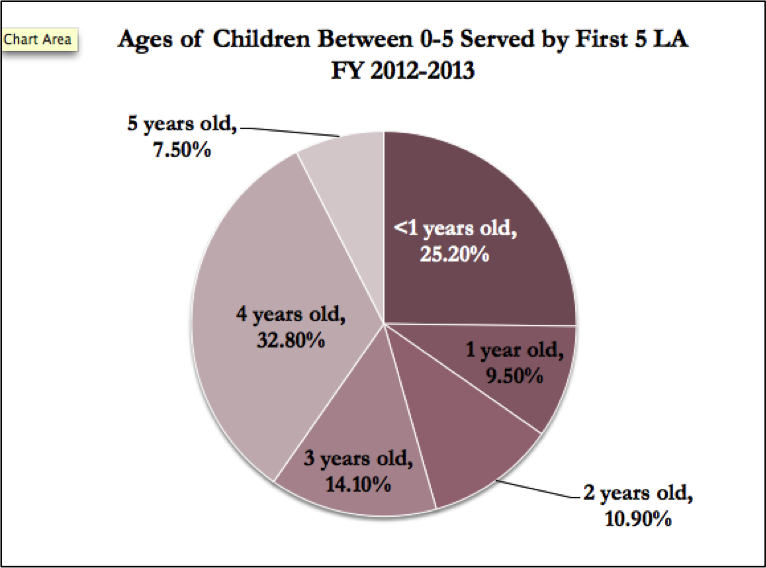
Ages of Children Served by First 5 LA 2012-2013

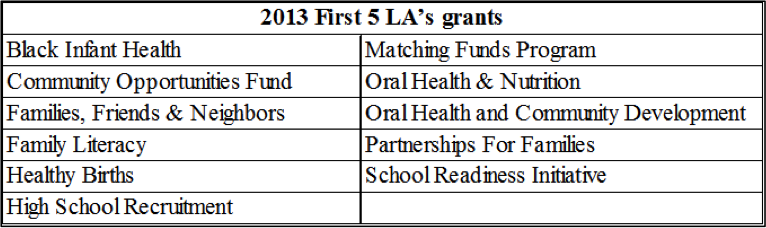
2013 First 5 LA's Grants

Since 1998, First 5 LA has contributed $800 million in grants and programs to benefit the children of LA County. First 5 LA manages funding for proposals or projects through a transparent Request for Proposal/Request for Qualification process. Proposals or projects can fall under the following categories:

- Direct Services (Grant Agreement): Services where the grant recipient directly interacts with First 5 LA's target population.
- Professional Services (Contract): Services that benefit First 5 LA or where the contract is not directly interacting with target populations.
- Vendor Agreements: Routine purchases of goods or services.

First 5 LA's funding decisions are guided by the following principles:

- Early learning: Programs that improve children's achievement of their developmental potential.
- Health: Programs that improve access to and quality of health resources.
- Safe children and families: Programs aimed to support families so they can raise their children safely.
- Prenatal through three: Programs focused on children from prenatal to the age of three.

== Controversy ==
First 5 LA has faced controversy due to the 2011 Harvey M. Rose audit that prompted concerns over its financial management.

It discovered that while the program was overstaffed, it underspent on programs, resulting in a surplus of $800 million unused funds. Auditors also noted a lack of transparency within the organization. Staff within First 5 LA failed to report over $200 million in contracts and grant awards in one fiscal year, despite the policy that contracts exceeding $25,000 were to be approved by commissioners. The lack of commission oversight made it impossible for auditors to determine whether or not agreements were made for appropriate purposes or qualified vendors and determine whether or not malfeasance had occurred.

In response to the audit, First Five LA's former executive director, Evelyn V. Martinez, resigned. Los Angeles County Board of Supervisors voted 4–1 to make moves towards to transform First 5 LA from a separate legal entity to a county agency.

In response to these challenges, the commission developed an accelerated plan to utilize nearly $400 million in program and services for county children. The plan, which began in 2012, is estimated to serve up to 200,000 children. Some of the initiatives provide services such as expanded health intervention programs, housing for homeless families, expansion of dental care for children age 5 and younger, and partnerships with UCLA to bring dental and vision care to preschoolers.

== Public health implications ==
First 5 LA's four goal statements carry several public health implications.

Babies are born healthy.

By providing health insurance and access support programs, First 5 LA seeks to reduce the proportion low weight births, which account for 20 percent of neonatal deaths. Ensuring that babies are born healthy may result in a reduction of healthcare expenditures associated with delivery and care, as well a reduction in the prevalence of disabilities such as cerebral palsy, mental retardation, and vision and hearing impairments.

Children maintain a healthy weight.

First 5 LA seeks to ensure that children maintain a healthy weight by supporting local advocacy efforts and access to nutritious foods. Tackling childhood obesity can result in decreased risks for Type 2 diabetes, cardiovascular disease, respiratory disease, arthritis, and poor social and psychological development.

Children are safe from abuse and neglect.

First 5 LA seeks to ensure that children are safe from abuse and neglect through home visitation and parent education programs that may be tailored to target specific outcomes. Reducing prevalence of child abuse and neglect reduces cases of physical, psychological and emotional injuries. Child abuse and neglect are linked to an increased risk of substance abuse, eating disorders, obesity, depression, suicide, and sexual promiscuity later in life.

Children are ready for kindergarten.

First 5 LA seeks to support operations and development of preschools as well as a comprehensive system to assess, support, and incentivize preschool quality. Increased reading skills improve school performance and may lead to outcomes such as higher productivity and health literacy.

== Outcomes ==
Evaluation of the Black Infant Health program has suggested that BIH clients have lower amounts of birth defects, infant mortality, and higher amounts of breast-feeding when compared to other African American mothers in LA County and the U.S. Evaluation of the Healthy Birth Initiative showed more intermediary results. Rates of gestational age, pre-term birth weight, and infant mortality were higher in HBI clients when compared to LA County statistics. Although comparisons of infant mortality and pre-term birth rates between HBI clients and the outside community were not statistically significant, the proportion of Cesarean births and formula feeding was found to be significantly lower.

First 5 LA's Early Developmental Screening Initiative has shown increased collaboration between clinicians, community groups, and patients. Physician practices that participated within EDSI's Physician Collaborative increased developmental screening rates from 20% to over 85%. Furthermore, rates of maternal depression screening also increased from 7% to 54%, and the percentage of participating practices which used comprehensive care prompting systems increased from 7% to 77%. Collaboration with Women, Infants, and Children (WIC) programs has shown modest gains in visit preparation; 18% of the 500,000 participants reported that the programs affected the way they approach doctors visits.

The Family Literacy Initiative also showed moderately positive outcomes; in fact, greater family participation in the Family Literacy program was associated with greater increases in parent reading skills, library use, and school involvement. Although child participation in early childhood education classes was not correlated to an increase in pre-literacy or math skills, parent participation was correlated with higher child ability to name numbers, understand stories, and learn English. The School Readiness Initiative showed small but statistically significant improvements in child communication and social-emotional school readiness skills. SRI children also had higher scores in English proficiency, and slightly higher scores on mathematical assessments.
