= California Proposition 53 =

California Proposition 53 may refer to:

- 2003 California Proposition 53, about Funds Dedicated for State and Local Infrastructure
- 2016 California Proposition 53, about revenue bonds
