= 2016 Oklahoma State Question 777 =

Failed constitutional referendum

State Question 777
- November 8, 2016
- Oklahoma Right to Farm Referendum

Results
Choice	Votes	%
Yes	569,668	39.71%
No	864,827	60.29%
Total votes	1,434,495	100.00%
- No: >90% 80–90% 70–80% 60–70% 50–60% Yes: >90% 80–90% 70–80% 60–70% 50–60% Other: Tie No votes

Oklahoma State Question 777 was a referendum on a proposed amendment to the Oklahoma Constitution held in November 2016. The referendum attempted to exempt agriculture and agribusiness from compliance with state laws passed in 2015 and later, unless a "compelling state interest" was involved.

The referendum was hotly controversial. Supporters referred to State Question 777 as 'right to farm', while opposition groups referred to it as the 'right to harm', citing concerns over water supply quality, animal welfare, small farmer interests, and loss of representative government. The amendment was generally agreed by scholars and the media to be poorly written with much room for interpretation by legislators and judges, which would likely cause numerous expensive and time-consuming lawsuits to the detriment of the people and farmers of Oklahoma if passed. The referendum failed, with the vote going 58-42% against the amendment.

== Text ==
"To protect agriculture as a vital sector of Oklahoma's economy, which provides food, energy, health benefits, and security and is the foundation and stabilizing force of Oklahoma's economy, the rights of citizens and lawful residents of Oklahoma to engage in farming and ranching practices shall be forever guaranteed in this state. The Legislature shall pass no law which abridges the right of citizens and lawful residents of Oklahoma to employ agricultural technology and livestock production and ranching practices without a compelling state interest. Nothing in this section shall be construed to modify any provision of common law or statutes relating to trespass, eminent domain, dominance of mineral interests, easements, rights of way or any other property rights. Nothing in this section shall be construed to modify or enact any statute or ordinance enacted by the Legislature or any political subdivision prior to December 31, 2014."

== Overview ==
The amendment would prevent the Oklahoma Legislature (and, by extension, regulatory agencies whose power derives from the legislature) from enacting new regulations involving farming unless the regulations meet the highest level of examination due to the 'compelling state interest' phrase. It would inhibit many cities and counties from effectively enacting ordinances to prevent water pollution in the agriculture sector by the fact that it would be too expensive for local governments from a litigation standpoint. The legislature would be unable to regulate animal welfare for farm animals such as hogs, pigs and chickens. It is unclear how the amendment would have affected neutral state laws that affected all individuals; presumably, a special carve-out would be applied such that the regulations would be suspended for cases in which they affected "farming and ranching practices".

=== Supporting arguments ===
State Question 777 held support from advocacy groups such as the Oklahoma Cattlemen's Association, Oklahoma Farm Bureau, and the Oklahoma Pork Council. These groups advocated for the bill by saying that it would help them be protected from illegitimate laws and regulations. Specifically, they claim that SQ 777 would protect them from certain ballot initiatives developed and paid for by wealthy animal-rights groups. Another argument is that the bill would shield farmers from restrictive laws, and enable consumers to decide which practices they would support. Supporters also say that SQ 777 would boost food security. Their argument here is that in the status quo, without SQ 777, legislators could at some point pass laws to restrict food production, thereby increasing food insecurity issues in the state. More generally, supporters advocated from a position of generalized distrust of government intervention.

=== Opposing arguments ===
Those in opposition to the bill included the Humane Society of the United States, the Oklahoma Food cooperative (which represents small farmers), the Oklahoma Municipal League, and the Inter-Tribal Council of the Five Civilized Tribes. Arguments against included that SQ 777 would benefit big farming corporations and industrial factory farms by preventing legislation to protect smaller farming groups. If a dispute arose between a large farm and a small farm, it is unclear how government could intervene to settle it under SQ 777, with the result being that small farmers would be unable to assert their rights against misconduct from a large neighbor. Another argument is that the bill would harm the environment, specifically through polluting Oklahoma's drinking water without the ability to protect it from agricultural chemical runoff and animal waste disposal. Opponents also argue that the bill would harm the ability for Oklahoma's elected legislators to secure viable standards and regulations on protecting the environment, food production, and even protection against animal cruelty. Another argument from the opposition is that SQ 777 would harm Oklahoman democracy; that in general, specific classes of activity are not deemed immune from regulation from democratically elected legislators, and that Oklahoma's existing regulation was already extremely lenient and hands-off for Oklahoma business.

== Key players ==
Mark Yates from the Oklahoma Farm Bureau defended the Right to Farm Bill against these claims from opponents of the bill by pointing to the failure of regulations in other states. He referenced Proposition 2, an act by Californian legislators to try to increase the space needed for chickens bred from commercial egg production. Yates argued this legislation was something that a law that caused more problems than anything, by decreasing overall production while increasing production costs. As a result, eggs produced in California were more expensive. However, Brian Ted Jones of Oklahoma's Kirkpatrick Foundation argued that his was a bit misleading. Jones pointed out "the price of eggs rose dramatically throughout the country that year, largely because of the unprecedented devastation to poultry flocks caused by a severe outbreak of avian flu". Notable opponents included the former Oklahoma Attorney General Drew Edmondson, who cited many of these same reasons previously indicated as his rationale for opposing SQ 777 Right to Farm Bill.

== Results ==
The amendment was ultimately rejected by the voters with 60.3% against the bill on November 8, 2016. Additionally, State Question 780 passed, which reclassified certain drug possession crimes involving small amounts of material from felonies to misdemeanors. The results - generally perceived as a "liberal" victory in a conservative state - showed that "there is still a strand of Heartland populism that is skeptical of Big Agra" by David Blatt of the Oklahoma Policy Institute.
