= 2016 California Proposition 56 =

Proposition 56
- Cigarette Tax

Results
Choice	Votes	%
Yes	8,980,448	64.43%
No	4,957,994	35.57%
Valid votes	13,938,442	95.40%
Invalid or blank votes	672,067	4.60%
Total votes	14,610,509	100.00%
Registered voters/turnout	19,411,771	75.27%
County results
Yes
80–90%
70–80%
60–70%
50–60%
No
60–70%
50–60%

Proposition 56 is a California ballot proposition that passed on the November 8, 2016 ballot. It increased the cigarette tax by $2.00 per pack, effective April 1, 2017, with equivalent increases on other tobacco products and electronic cigarettes containing nicotine. The bulk of new revenue is earmarked for Medi-Cal.

A September 2016 poll by the Public Policy Institute of California showed that 59% of likely voters supported Proposition 56, 36% opposed it, and 5% did not know how they would vote. A September 2016 poll from USC Dornsife / Los Angeles Times showed 63% percent of registered voters in favor of Proposition 56, 32% opposed, and 6% unknown.

Proposition 56 was approved with 64% of the vote. Two previous attempts to increase the state cigarette tax narrowly failed with Proposition 86 in 2006 and Proposition 29 in 2012. Proposition 56 was the first increase in the state cigarette tax since Proposition 10 in 1998. With the passage of Prop. 56, California's cigarette tax increased from $0.87 per pack to $2.87, increasing its rank from 35th-highest in the country to ninth-highest.

== See also ==
- California Proposition 99 (1988)
- California Proposition 10 (1998)
- Cigarette taxes in the United States
