= 2016 Fairfax County meals tax referendum =

The Fairfax County meals tax referendum is a 2016 referendum that proposes a 4% tax on all prepared meals sold in Fairfax County, Virginia. The 4% tax would be on top of the current 6% state sales tax, resulting in a total of 10% in taxes charged on all prepared meals. The referendum was voted on by Fairfax County residents in the general election on November 8, 2016.

The referendum was rejected by voters in by a margin of 56%–44%.

== History ==
A similar meals tax proposal was put to a referendum in 1992, and was defeated by a margin of 58%–42%. The proposal for a meals tax in Fairfax County has been debated for years; the most recent effort in 2012 failed to get the question on the ballot.

In 2014, the Fairfax County Board of Supervisors formed a task force to explore the issue. On June 7, 2016, the Fairfax County Board of Supervisors voted 8–2 to place the question on the ballot in the November 2016 general election.

== Ballot question ==
The question on the ballot will read as follows:

"For the purpose of reducing dependence on real estate taxes, shall the Board of Supervisors of Fairfax County, Virginia, be authorized to levy a tax on prepared food and beverages, otherwise known as a meals tax, as allowed by Virginia Code § 58.1–3833, at a rate not to exceed four percent (4%) of the amount charged for prepared food and beverages (which, based upon state law, is applicable only to sales outside the town of Clifton, and towns of Herndon and Vienna that have already implemented a meals tax)? The revenues generated shall be dedicated to the following purposes:

70 percent of the net revenues to Fairfax County Public Schools.

30 percent of the net revenues to County services, capital improvements and property tax relief."

== Arguments ==
=== In favor ===
Supporters of the meals tax say it would give the county a new source of revenue and reduce its dependence on real estate taxes. It would generate an estimated $99 million in revenue per year, according to the county. Supporters say the money is needed to fund schools after several years of budget cuts. Fairfax County Board of Supervisors chairman Sharon Bulova wrote in an October editorial that the 70% designated for county schools would be used primarily for teachers' salaries, and pointed to similar meals taxes in neighboring counties and cities.

Prominent supporters of the meals tax include The Washington Post editorial board, Fairfax County Board of Supervisors chairman Sharon Bulova, and Fairfax County School Board chairman Pat Hynes.

=== Against ===
Opponents of the meals tax say it would unfairly affect low-income and middle-income families, and negatively impact tourism. They say that it would cause decreased tipping, devastating waiters who rely on tips to make a living. They also point out that restaurants only make 3–4% in profit, and the meals tax would hurt small business owners. Springfield District Supervisor Pat Herrity said in an October forum that the answer to county budget problems is to address spending issues, not create a new tax.

Prominent opponents of the meals tax referendum include Fairfax-based Great American Restaurants, Clyde's Restaurant Group, the Northern Virginia Chamber of Commerce.

== Campaign organizations ==
The primary political organization backing the referendum is called the Invest in Fairfax Referendum Committee, while the primary political organization opposing the referendum is called Fairfax Families Against the Food Tax.

== Results ==
Fairfax County Meals Tax
Choice	Votes	%
For	249,215	46.18
Against	290,460	53.82
Total	539,675	100.00
Source: – Official Results
