= 2016 Montana Initiative 182 =

Referendum on medical marijuana

Initiative 182
- November 8, 2016
- Expand Medical Marijuana.

Results
Choice	Votes	%
Yes	291,334	57.87%
No	212,089	42.13%
County results
Yes
60–70%
50–60%
No
70–80%
60–70%
50–60%

Initiative 182 was a 2016 ballot initiative that amended Montana law to legalize marijuana for medical use in the state. The initiative passed via public referendum on November 8, 2016, with 58% of voters supporting and 42% opposing.

The text of the ballot measure states:

I-182 renames the Montana Marijuana Act to the Montana Medical Marijuana Act and amends the Act. I-182 allows a single treating physician to certify medical marijuana for a patient diagnosed with chronic pain and includes post-traumatic stress disorder (PTSD) as a “debilitating medical condition” for which a physician may certify medical marijuana. Licensing requirements, fees and prohibitions are detailed for medical marijuana dispensaries and testing laboratories. I-182 repeals the limit of three patients for each licensed provider, and allows providers to hire employees to cultivate, dispense, and transport medical marijuana. I-182 repeals the requirement that physicians who provide certifications for 25 or more patients annually be referred to the board of medical examiners. I-182 removes the authority of law enforcement to conduct unannounced inspections of medical marijuana facilities, and requires annual inspections by the State.

== Results ==
Initiative 182
Choice	Votes	%
For	291,334	66.27
Against	148,263	33.73
Total	439,597	100.00
Registered voters/turnout	439,597	63.30

== See also ==
- Cannabis in Montana
- Marijuana Policy Project § Ballot initiatives
