= 2016 California Proposition 59 =

Proposition 59
- Corporate Political Spending Advisory Question

Results
Choice	Votes	%
Yes	6,845,943	53.18%
No	6,027,084	46.82%
Valid votes	12,873,027	88.11%
Invalid or blank votes	1,737,482	11.89%
Total votes	14,610,509	100.00%
Registered voters/turnout	19,411,771	75.27%
County results
Yes
70–80%
60–70%
50–60%
No
60–70%
50–60%

California Proposition 59 is a non-binding advisory question that appeared on the 2016 California November general election ballot. It asked voters if they wanted California to work towards overturning the Citizens United U.S. Supreme Court ruling.

== Background ==
On January 21, 2010, the U.S. Supreme Court delivered its 5–4 decision on Citizens United v. FEC, ruling that freedom of speech prohibited the government from restricting independent political expenditures by a nonprofit corporation. The principles articulated by the Supreme Court in the case have also been extended to for-profit corporations, labor unions and other associations. This decision was criticized by a number of politicians, academics, attorneys and journalists because it allows unlimited election spending by corporations. Members of 16 state legislatures (including California's) have called for a U.S. constitutional amendment to reverse the court.

The California State Legislature originally put Proposition 49 on the 2014 California November general election ballot. It would have been a non-binding advisory question presented to voters, asking if the U.S. Congress should propose a constitutional amendment to overturn Citizens United. However, the California Supreme Court ordered that the measure be pulled from the ballot pending further state constitutional review: at issue was that the state legislature had no defined specific power in either the state constitution or in any other state law to place such advisory measures on the ballot. The California Supreme Court ruled in January 2016 that such an advisory question could indeed be placed on the ballot, and the California State Legislature subsequently placed Proposition 59 on the November ballot.

== The advisory question ==
The proposition does not having any binding legal effect, nor any direct fiscal effect. California previously used voter instructions in the Article V process in an 1892 proposition placed on the ballot by the Legislature in support of the 17th Amendment (Direct Election of Senators).

The proposition asks, "Shall California's elected officials use all of their constitutional authority, including, but not limited to, proposing and ratifying" constitutional amendment(s) to overturn Citizens United. Under Article Five of the U.S. Constitution, the process for amending the Constitution can only be initiated by either Congress or a national convention assembled at the request of the legislatures of at least two-thirds (at present 34) of the states. Then, at least three-fourths (at present 38) of the states must approve the proposed amendment before it becomes law.

== Editorial opinion ==
=== Support ===
- The San Francisco Chronicle stated that even though it is non-binding, Proposition 59 "is too important to bypass" and that it "would affirm this state's commitment to genuine campaign finance reform".
- San Jose Mercury News
- The Daily Californian
- Sacramento Bee

=== Oppose ===
- The Los Angeles Times wrote in opposition, citing the difficult process of amending the Constitution, as well as the fact that Proposition 59 does not exactly specify what such a proposed constitutional amendment would actually say. Meanwhile, "Citizens United, which was decided only six years ago by a mere 5–4 majority, could plausibly be reconsidered or narrowed with a change in the court's membership."
- The Ventura County Star suggested voters leave their votes blank to show opposition both to Citizens United and to advisory measures.
