= Oklahoma Municipal League =

The Oklahoma Municipal League (OML) is an association of the incorporated cities and towns of Oklahoma, organized for mutual assistance and improvement.

OML's functions include:

- Working during legislative sessions to explain the municipal viewpoint, support bills useful to cities and towns, and oppose legislation detrimental to municipal government operations.
- Meeting with federal and state agency personnel to ensure that their policies and programs are compatible with and meet the needs of city and town officials.
- Bringing to public attention the issues confronting city and town officials and their impact on Oklahomans who live in municipalities.
- Appearing in appellate court, with the OML Board of Directors's approval, on cases that can have a statewide effect on municipal government.
