= Illinois Transportation Taxes and Fees Lockbox Amendment =

Illinois Transportation Taxes and Fees Lockbox Amendment, 2016
- Concerns the Prohibition of Lawmakers from Using Transportation Funds for Anything other than their Stated Purpose.

Results
Choice	Votes	%
Yes	3,796,654	78.91%
No	1,014,461	21.09%
Valid votes	4,811,115	84.91%
Invalid or blank votes	855,003	15.09%
Total votes	5,666,118	100.00%
Registered voters/turnout	8,029,847	70.56%
Yes
80–90%
70–80%

On November 8, 2016, Illinois voters approved the Illinois Transportation Taxes and Fees Lockbox Amendment, a legislatively referred constitutional amendment that prohibits lawmakers from using transportation funds for anything other than their stated purpose.

== Amendment text ==
The amendment added the following a Section 11 to Article IX of the Illinois Constitution:

Section 11. Transportation Funds

(a) No moneys, including bond proceeds, derived from taxes, fees, excises, or license taxes relating to registration, title, or operation or use of vehicles, or related to the use of highways, roads, streets, bridges, mass transit, intercity passenger rail, ports, airports, or to fuels used for propelling vehicles, or derived from taxes, fees, excises, or license taxes relating to any other transportation infrastructure or transportation operation, shall be expended for purposes other than as provided in subsections (b) and (c).

(b) Transportation funds may be expended for the following: the costs of administering laws related to vehicles and transportation, including statutory refunds and adjustments provided in those laws; payment of highway obligations; costs for construction, reconstruction, maintenance, repair, and betterment of highways, roads, streets, bridges, mass transit, intercity passenger rail, ports, airports, or other forms of transportation; and other statutory highway purposes. Transportation funds may also be expended for the State or local share of highway funds to match federal aid highway funds, and expenses of grade separation of highways and railroad crossings, including protection of at-grade highways and railroad crossings, and, with respect to local governments, other transportation purposes as authorized by law.

(c) The costs of administering laws related to vehicles and transportation shall be limited to direct program expenses related to the following: the enforcement of traffic, railroad, and motor carrier laws; the safety of highways, roads, streets, bridges, mass transit, intercity passenger rail, ports, or airports; and the construction, reconstruction, improvement, repair, maintenance, operation, and administration of highways, under any related provisions of law or any purpose related or incident to, including grade separation of highways and railroad crossings. The limitations to the costs of administering laws related to vehicles and transportation under this subsection (c) shall also include direct program expenses related to workers' compensation claims for death or injury of employees of the State's transportation agency; the acquisition of land and the erection of buildings for highway purposes, including the acquisition of highway rights-of-way or for investigations to determine the reasonable anticipated future highway needs; and the making of surveys, plans, specifications, and estimates for the construction and maintenance of flight strips and highways. The expenses related to the construction and maintenance of flight strips and highways under this subsection (c) are for the purpose of providing access to military and naval reservations, defense-industries, defense-industry sites, and sources of raw materials, including the replacement of existing highways and highway connections shut off from general use at military and naval reservations, defense-industries, and defense-industry sites, or the purchase of rights-of-way.

(d) None of the revenues described in subsection (a) of this Section shall, by transfer, offset, or otherwise, be diverted to any purpose other than those described in subsections (b) and (c) of this Section.

(e) If the General Assembly appropriates funds for a mode of transportation not described in this Section, the General Assembly must provide for a dedicated source of funding.

(f) Federal funds may be spent for any purposes authorized by federal law.

== Passage in the legislature ==
The amendment had been sponsored in the legislature by Democrat Brandon Phelps.

Only four members of the Illinois House of Representatives voted against placing the amendment on the ballot (Democrats Barbara Flynn Currie, Laura Fine, Elaine Nekritz, and Pamela Reaves-Harris). The four published an op-ed in which they argued, "Experience has demonstrated that unexpected events can have drastic impacts on our state budget. A major natural disaster or economic turmoil can blow huge holes in a budget, even in states in healthy financial condition - which Illinois is decidedly not. This amendment would severely curtail the ability of the state to react to these types of events."

== Election ==
In order to be approved, the measure required either 60% support among those specifically voting on the amendment or 50% support among all ballots cast in the elections.

The ballot title was,

The proposed amendment adds a new section to the Revenue Article of the Illinois Constitution. The proposed amendment provides that no moneys derived from taxes, fees, excises, or license taxes, relating to registration, titles, operation, or use of vehicles or public highways, roads, streets, bridges, mass transit, intercity passenger rail, ports, or airports, or motor fuels, including bond proceeds, shall be expended for other than costs of administering laws related to vehicles and transportation, costs for construction, reconstruction, maintenance, repair, and betterment of public highways, roads, streets, bridges, mass transit, intercity passenger rail, ports, airports, or other forms of transportation, and other statutory highway purposes, including the State or local share to match federal aid highway funds. You are asked to decide whether the proposed amendment should become part of the Illinois Constitution.

The ballot summary read,

The proposed amendment adds a new Section to the Revenue Article of the Illinois Constitution that provides revenue generated from transportation related taxes and fees (referred to as "transportation funds") shall be used exclusively for transportation related purposes. Transportation related taxes and fees include motor fuel taxes, vehicle registration fees, and other taxes and user fees dedicated to public highways, roads, streets, bridges, mass transit (buses and rail), ports, or airports.

Under the proposed amendment, transportation funds may be used by the State or local governments only for the following purposes: (1) costs related to administering transportation and vehicle laws, including public safety purposes and the payment of obligations such as bonds; (2) the State or local share necessary to secure federal funds or for local government transportation purposes as authorized by law; (3) the construction, reconstruction, improvement, repair, maintenance, and operation of highways, mass transit, and railroad crossings; (4) expenses related to workers' compensation claims for death or injury of transportation agency employees; and (5) to purchase land for building highways or buildings for to be used for highway purposes.

This new Section is a limitation on the power of the General Assembly or a unit of local government to use, divert, or transfer transportation funds for a purpose other than transportation. It does not, and is not intended to, impact or change the way in which the State and local governments use sales taxes, including the sales and excise tax on motor fuel, or alter home rule powers granted under this Constitution. It does not seek to change the way in which the State funds programs administered by the Illinois Secretary of State, Illinois Department of Transportation, and operations by the Illinois State Police directly dedicated to the safety of roads, or entities or programs funded by units of local government. Further, the Section does not impact the expenditure of federal funds, which may be spent for any purpose authorized by federal law

=== Endorsements ===
For

Organizations

- AAA Chicago
- American Council of Engineering Companies
- American Council of Engineering Companies-Illinois
- Americans for Prosperity Illinois
- American Traffic Safety Services Association
- Associated General Contractors of Illinois
- Champaign County Chamber of Commerce
- Edwardsville-Glen Carbon Chamber of Commerce
- Excavators, Inc.
- Federation of Women Contractors
- Fox Valley AGC
- Illinois AFL–CIO
- Illinois Asphalt Pavement Association
- Illinois Association of Aggregate Producers
- Illinois Black Chamber of Commerce
- Illinois Chamber of Commerce
- Illinois Chapter of American Society of Civil Engineers
- Illinois Construction Industry Committee
- Illinois Democratic County Chairmen's Association
- Illinois Economic Policy Institute
- Illinois Petroleum Council
- Illinois Professional Land Surveyor's Association
- Illinois Republican County Chairmen's Association
- Illinois Road and Transportation Builders Association
- Illinois Society of Professional Engineers
- Illinois Soybean Association
- Illinois State Council of Operating Engineers
- Illinois Trucking Association
- Illinois Valley Contractors Association
- Indiana, Illinois, Iowa Foundation for Fair Contracting
- International Association of Iron Workers
- International Union of Operating Engineers, Local 150
- Iron Workers District Council of Chicago and Vicinity
- Iron Workers District Council of St. Louis and Vicinity
- Lake County Contractors Association
- Metropolitan Planning Council
- Mid-West Truckers Association
- Naperville Chamber
- Northwestern Illinois Contractors Association
- PCA Midwest
- PCI of Illinois and Wisconsin
- Rockford-Winnebago and Belvidere-Boone County Better Roads Association
- Southern Illinois Builders Association
- Southern Illinois Construction Advancement Program
- Transportation for Illinois Coalition
- Underground Contractors Association of Illinois
- Will and Grundy Contractors Association

Officeholders

- Brandon Phelps, Illinois State Representative
- Gary Forby, Illinois State Senator
- Bill Haine, Illinois State Senator
- Thomas M. Bennett, Illinois State Representative
- Ed Rendell, former Governor of Pennsylvania
- Ray LaHood, former U.S. Secretary of Transportation

Individuals

- Todd Maisch, President and CEO of the Illinois Chamber of Commerce and co-chair of the Transportation for Illinois Coalition
- Mike Kleinik, Executive Director of the Chicago Laborers District Council-LMCC and co-chair of the Transportation for Illinois Coalition
Against

Organizations

- Better Government Association
- Taxpayers Federation of Illinois

Officeholders

- Barbara Flynn Currie, Illinois State Representative
- Laura Fine, Illinois State Representative
- Elaine Nekritz, Illinois State Representative
- Pamela Reaves-Harris, Illinois State Representative

=== Results ===
Illinois Transportation Taxes and Fees Lockbox Amendment
Choice	Votes	%
For	3,796,654	78.91
Against	1,014,461	21.09
Total	4,811,115	100.00
Valid votes	4,811,115	84.91
Invalid/blank votes	855,003	15.09
Total votes	5,666,118	100.00
Registered voters/turnout	8,029,847	70.56
Source: Illinois State Board of Elections

Thresholds for passage
Option	Votes	% of votes on measure	% of all ballots cast
For	3,796,654	78.94	67.47
Against	1,014,461	21.09	18.03
Total votes	4,811,115	100	85.50
Voter turnout	59.92%		

The election passed both the 60% support threshold among those specifically voting on the amendment as well as the 50% support among all ballots cast in the election threshold.
