= 2016 California Proposition 67 =

Proposition 67
- Ban on Single-use plastic bags

Results
Choice	Votes	%
Yes	7,228,900	53.27%
No	6,340,322	46.73%
Valid votes	13,569,222	92.87%
Invalid or blank votes	1,041,287	7.13%
Total votes	14,610,509	100.00%
Registered voters/turnout	19,411,771	75.27%
County results
Yes
70–80%
60–70%
50–60%
No
70–80%
60–70%
50–60%

Proposition 67 was a California ballot proposition on the November 8, 2016 ballot. A "Yes" vote was to approve, and a "No" vote to reject, a statute that prohibits grocery and other stores from providing customers single–use plastic or paper carryout bags but permits the sale of recycled paper bags and reusable bags for a fee.

Proposition 67 passed with 53% of the vote. With its passage, Senate Bill 270, which bans plastic shopping bags, was upheld and went into full effect. A related measure to allocate revenue generated from the sale of disposable carryout bags, specifically paper bags, to the Wildlife Conservation Fund, Proposition 65, failed at the polls.

== Background ==
=== Environmental impact ===
Single-use plastic shopping bags are inexpensive to produce and effective for consumer use, and thus have taken over the market. These bags hold roughly an 80 percent share of the grocery and convenience store market since their introduction. According to a 2008 estimate in Waste Management, people around the world discard between 500 billion and 1 trillion plastic bags a year.

The United States Environmental Protection Agency describes both the Pollution Prevention Act and the Resource Conservation and Recovery Act as establishing a nationwide objective for environmental protection. In detailing the wave of communities initiating bans on single-use plastic bags, the EPA cites the following rationale for limits on single-use plastic bags:

1. they are typically made out of petroleum-based plastic and don't biodegrade when they are disposed of or escape into the environment;
2. when plastic bags are disposed of on land they may be blown into creeks, lakes, or oceans where they can entangle marine life or the animals may mistakenly eat the plastic bags thinking that they are food;
3. the light-weight plastic is not easily recyclable; and
4. the bags are often used only once before being thrown away.

Single-use plastic bags are considered to be a major contributor to the Great Pacific Garbage Patch, an area in the Pacific Ocean with high concentrations of litter and floating plastic by the National Oceanic and Atmospheric Administration.

Plastic is produced from petroleum, natural gas, and added chemicals, using large amounts of fossil fuel in production. Additionally, when plastic bags are disposed of in landfills, chemicals from this buried plastic are released into the surrounding environment and groundwater. National Geographic states that some of these chemicals, notably phthalates and bisphenol A, have been implicated as human health problems.

=== Worldwide legislation ===
Due to the environmental impact of plastic bags, numerous countries and cities around the world have implemented either taxes or bans on single-use plastic bags.

- Ireland instituted a 15 Euro cent levy on plastic bags in 2002, resulting in a 90% reduction in usage
- Uganda banned Polythene carrier bags in 2007
- China banned many types of plastic bags in 2008, and has seen reduction despite trouble enforcing the law
- The European Union passed legislation in 2015 with the aim to cut plastic bag use in half by 2019
- France implemented banned single-use plastic bags on July 1, 2016, and banned plastic dinnerware as well

A more in-depth view at developments regarding limited use of plastic bags throughout the world can be found at Phase-out of lightweight plastic bags.

==== United States legislation ====
- Washington D.C. became the first U.S. city to tax grocery store customers for plastic bag use, followed by Montgomery County, Maryland
- All counties in Hawaii have banned plastic bags effective July 2015
- Puerto Rico banned use of plastic bags effective 2016
- Arizona, Florida, Idaho, Indiana, Iowa, Michigan, Minnesota, Missouri, and Wisconsin have state laws preventing local government from regulating the sale or use of plastic bags

=== Reduction methods ===
While legislation throughout the United States differs, the Environmental Protection Agency notes similarities across legislation that includes strict standard for replacement bags implemented at a fee. Generally, replacement multi-use bags must be either recyclable or compostable. The bag must be built for extended use and have the ability to carry more weight than a standard, single-use bag. In many areas, plastic bag bans require retailers to charge a fee associated with providing reusable plastic bags to both cover the costs of providing heavier-duty bags and encourage consumers to provide their own bags. Multiple studies have been conducted to determine the most effective way to reduce consumer use of single-use plastic bags.

Cities within the United States have implemented both bans and fees to reduce the consumption of single-use plastic bags to varying degrees of effectiveness. San Jose, California banned plastic bags and saw an 89% decrease in the quantity of plastic bags found in the city's storm drains. On the other hand, Washington DC implemented a five-cent tax on bags that has led to a 60% reduction in bag usage.

==== Studies ====
===== Financial incentives =====
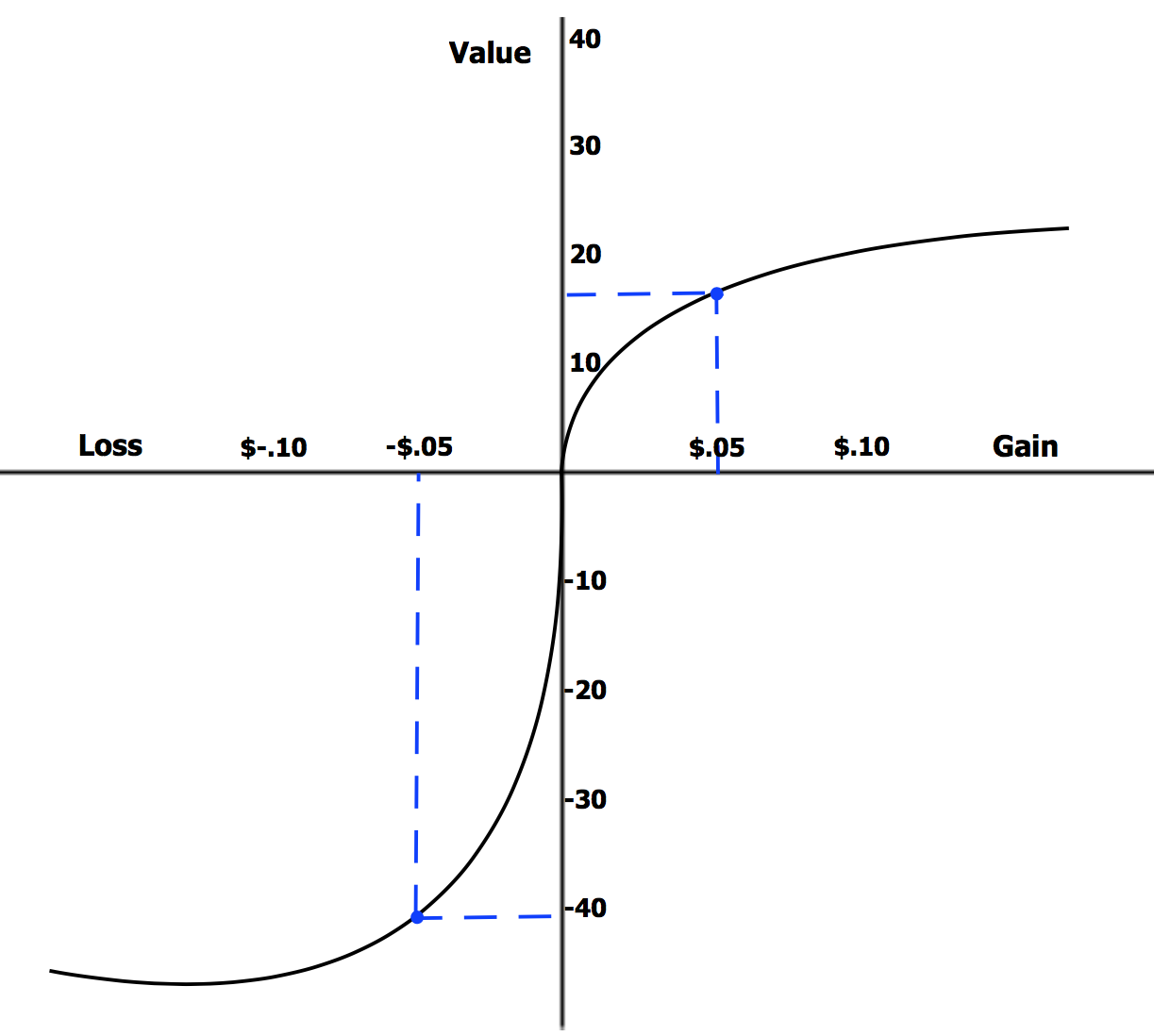
Graph Depicting Loss Aversion. A loss of $.05 results in a larger decrease in value than a gain of $.05 adds to value.

Tatiana Homonoff of Princeton University uses design-based research to estimate the effectiveness policies related to plastic bag usage in the United States. She finds a large decline in plastic bag use immediately following the implementation of a five-cent tax on plastic bags. Additionally, Homonoff found that those who continued to use plastic bags used fewer bags per shopping trip following the tax. In contrast, a policy that offered consumers a five-cent bonus for reusable shopping bags had almost no effect on consumption of single-use shopping bags. This pattern is consistent with the economic model of loss aversion, and highlights the importance of financial incentives when designing policies directed to change consumer behavior. The graph to the left displays how a loss of $.05 has a larger magnitude shift to value than a gain of $.05. Consumers who are loss averse will respond better to a penalty of five cents for using a single-use plastic bag rather than five-cent reward for using a reusable bag.

Sidharth Muralidharan and Kim Sheehan determine penalties for single-use plastic bag consumption are only effective in the short term and assess methods to deter plastic bag use in the long run. The authors explore consumer motivation by looking at how advertising messages framed as gains (avoiding a fee), losses (paying a tax) impact consumer behavior differently. Their findings demonstrate that a penalty framed as a tax may be more effective in motivating shoppers to bring reusable bags and to reduce consumption of single-use plastic bags.

===== Social incentives =====
Ritch, Brennan, and MacLeod argue that there are differences between regular consumer behaviors and those considered pro-environmental, thus complicating financial incentives with social expectations. Use of reusable shopping bags instead of single-use plastic has a signaling effect from the consumer to be thoughtful and care about the environment. There is a certain amount of shame associated with using a single-use plastic bag provided general public knowledge on its problematic impact on the environment.

Erkan Arı and Veysel Yılmaz study the impact of consumer attitudes on consumption of plastic bags in Turkey. The authors find that environmental consciousness and social pressure are factors in reducing consumption of plastic bags and causes for consumers to switch to reusable bags.

== Proposal ==
Per the State Constitution in California, new state laws may be placed before voters as a referendum to decide whether they will go into effect. The state law at question was Senate Bill 270, approved by the governor and filed with the Secretary of State on September 30, 2014. The bill prohibits certain stores from providing customers with plastic single-use bags, and charges $0.10 for other types of bags. These requirements apply only in areas that did not already have single-use carryout bag laws at the time. At the same time, another proposition regarding plastic grocery bags was on the ballot. Proposition 65 was an initiative to use proceeds from plastic bag sales in grocery stores to fund environmental projects in California. This initiative failed to pass, receiving 54.8% "No" votes.

=== Vote implications ===
==== "Yes" vote ====
A "Yes" vote upholds Senate Bill 270. This prohibits certain retail and grocery stores from providing free, single-use, carryout bags to customers. Single-use plastic bags will be banned, and stores may sell reusable plastic or paper bags for a minimum of $0.10 per bag. This law will only go into effect in areas without their own laws regarding single-use plastic bags.

==== "No" vote ====
A "No" vote rejects Senate Bill 270. Under this condition, stores in the State of California without city or county ordinances regarding single-use plastic bags will be free to continue to freely distribute such bags.

=== Fiscal impact ===
The Official Voter Information Guide states that the passing of this measure would have relatively small fiscal effects on both the state and local governments. The measure could result in an increase of state costs to CalRecycle to ensure bag manufacturers meet new requirements. The measure may result in some cost saving to local governments in the form of reduced cleanup or waste management costs.

== Provisions ==
=== Prohibits single-use plastic carryout bags ===
The measure prohibits grocery stores, convenience stores, pharmacies, and liquor stores from providing single-use, plastic, carryout bags. There are certain exceptions to this rule such as bags for unwrapped food products such as bulk produce or certain prescriptions.

=== Requires charge for other carryout bags ===
In addition to banning single-use plastic bags, the measure permits the sale of reusable plastic bags as a replacement to single-use bags at a minimum fee of $0.10. This fee does not apply to certain low-income customers. The revenue generated from reusable bag sales is kept by individual stores. Under the provision, stores must use proceeds to cover the costs of providing carryout bags, complying with the new measure, and efforts to educate and encourage reusable bag usage.

=== Creates new standards for reusable carryout bags ===
The measure creates new standards for the durability and material qualifications for reusable bags distributed at grocery stores, convenience stores, pharmacies, and liquor stores. The California Department of Resources Recovery is responsible for determining reusable bag requirements and ensuring bag manufacturers meet certification requirements.

== Implementation ==
=== Implementing the proposition ===
Under the proposition, grocery and retail stores with pharmacies, are prohibited to provide their customers single use plastic bags. Instead they are to provide certifiable reusable bags or recycled paper bags with a minimum surcharge of 10 cents per bag. Stores which do not have an implemented charge will be required to charge a minimum of 10 cents for a single plastic bag. Stores which have implemented a bag charge will be allowed to keep to their implemented price as long as it stays in accordance with terms outlined in the ban. The proposition sets to address any problems which arise inequity by requiring stores provide a reusable bag free of charge to recipients of food assistance, EBT, WIC, or Food Vouchers, as well as pharmacies provide bags containing a prescribed prescription.

== Support and opposition ==
=== In favor of Proposition 67 ===
==== Arguments for Proposition 67 ====
Those in favor of implementing Proposition 67 claim its passing will reduce litter, protect the ocean and wildlife, and reduce cleanup costs. Single-use plastic bags are one of the most common forms of litter and create environmental problems both on land and in water. An estimated 300 million plastic bags end up in the Atlantic Ocean, creating problems for sea-life. Build up of plastic bags on land lead to drainage problems resulting in floods. Plastic bags on land are slow to decompose, thus posing a continued threat to wildlife unless dealt with through human intervention and clean up. Julie Packard, Executive Director of the Monterey Bay Aquarium states: "Plastic bags harm wildlife everyday. Sea turtles, sea otters, seals, fish, and birds are tangled by plastic bags; some mistake the bags for food, fill their stomachs with plastics and die of starvation. YES on 67 is a common-sense solution to reduce plastic in our ocean, lakes and streams, and protect wildlife."

Plastic bags are hard to recycle, as there is no system implemented to successfully deal with their disposal. It is expensive to effectively recycle the type of plastics used in single-use plastic bags, as these bags can clog recycling system equipment. It is up to local governments and recycling companies to decide whether the practice of recycling single-use plastic bags is allowed.

Voting "Yes" on Proposition 67 keeps in place a law passed by the California State Legislature and signed by the Governor that stops the distribution of single-use bags to consumers. Multiple cities and counties in California have similar laws implemented, and this unifies state law throughout California. At the time of the vote, 122 ordinances banning single-use plastic bags had been approved in the State of California governing 151 jurisdictions.

==== Groups in support of Proposition 67 ====
Those in support of Proposition 67 highlight the environmental impacts of plastic bag usage and claim the opposition is composed of plastic bag companies from out of state. Committees formed primarily to fund and support this measure include:

Individual Ballot Measure Committees Formed for this Measure
Committee Name	Total Reported Contributions
California vs. Big Plastic, Protect the Plastic Bag Ban, Sponsored by Environmental, Ocean Protection, Grocery Store, Reusable Bag Manufacturer, Business and Other Nonprofit Organizations	$857,690
Californians Against Waste - Protect the Plastic Ban (Non-Profit 501 (C) (4))	$85,121
Committee to Protect the Plastic Bag Ban, Sponsored by the California Grocers Association (Non-Profit 501(c) 6): No on Proposition 67	$238,550
Save the Bag Ban, Sponsored by Environment California	$771,650
Save the Bay Action Fund Committee to Support Proposition 67	$99,375
Save the Bay Action Fund PAC - Yes on Prop 67	$3,600

=== In opposition of Proposition 67 ===
==== Arguments against Proposition 67 ====
Those in favor of plastic bags claim plastic bags are both cheap and hygienic. Plastic shopping bags can be used by consumers for multiple other uses, and therefore are not single-use as they are stated to be. Additionally, the implementation of a fee on reusable bags is an unnecessary burden to consumers that will be directed towards large stores instead of environmental efforts or projects with no oversight. Grocery stores profit off of consumers who are forced to pay a $.10 fee for each bag purchased.

Another concern regarding the ban of single-use plastic bags is both the effectiveness and environmental impact of alternative replacements. Opponents to single-use plastic bag bans argue that multi-use bags are not environmentally friendly either. In A UK Environment Agency report on life-cycle assessment of grocery bags, the authors find that with typical consumer behavior, the pollution-minimizing solution is to obtain single-use plastic grocery bags and reuse once for secondary tasks before disposing of bags. The larger environmental impact of reusable bags paired with the consumer behavior of treating bags similar to single-use actually results in more harm than good towards the environment.

Another concern about the Plastic bag ban is the possible job loss faced by those employed at single-use bag manufacturing companies. The implementations of the bill will require companies to implement and educate workers to produce a different product. With both processes taking more time and money than the $2 million the bill allocates towards this transition. Additionally, the implementation raises concerns on the impact of the consumer. The ban disenfranchises lower-income communities while stores profit. The bag charge grants all profits directly to stores and manufacturers without any allotment form environmental conservation efforts.

==== Groups in opposition of Proposition 67 ====
A number of large plastic companies support recycling plastic as opposed to a ban or reduction on its use. Committees formed primarily to fund the opposition to this measure include:

Individual Ballot Measure Committees Formed for this Measure
Committee Name	Total Reported Contributions
American Progressive Bag Alliance, a Project of the Society of the Plastics Industry (Non-Profit 501 (c) (6)), Yes on 65 and No on 67	$6,146,383
