= 2016 California Proposition 65 =

Proposition 65
- Carryout Bag Charges

Results
Choice	Votes	%
Yes	6,222,547	46.10%
No	7,276,478	53.90%
Valid votes	13,499,025	92.39%
Invalid or blank votes	1,111,484	7.61%
Total votes	14,610,509	100.00%
Registered voters/turnout	19,411,771	75.27%
County results
No
70–80%
60–70%
50–60%
Yes
50–60%

Proposition 65 was a California ballot proposition on the November 8, 2016 ballot that would have redirected money collected by grocery and certain other retail stores through mandated sale of carryout bags, and required stores to deposit bag sale proceeds into a special fund to support specified environmental projects.

Proposition 65 failed by a vote of 46%–54%.

The Progressive Bag Alliance, a plastic bag manufacturing trade group, backed Proposition 65, but opposed Proposition 67, a referendum on Senate Bill 270, which banned plastic shopping bags. With Proposition 67's passage, SB 270 was upheld and went into effect.
