= 1998 California Proposition 10 =

Referendum taxing tobacco

California Proposition 10 (1998) is an initiative state constitutional amendment that appeared in the 1998 California General Election. The amendment is officially titled the California Children and Families Act of 1998. This amendment put a $.50 tax on cigarettes, and up to $1 on other tobacco products such as chewing tobacco and cigars. The revenue from this tax would go to funding early childhood education in California. The tax went into effect January 1, 1999.

== History ==
In 1997, Rob Reiner, an actor and director and longtime child advocate, initiated the “I Am Your Child” public awareness campaign to make the welfare of children ages zero to three years a priority for the nation, but without greater measures he felt that the issue would not be addressed properly. Reiner gained support from the American Cancer Society, American Heart Association, and the Lung Cancer Association, all three organizations wanting to reduce the usage of tobacco, to help put Proposition 10 on the California general election ballot in 1998. Rob Reiner recruited Michael Huffington to join him as co-chairman of the campaign. Others that were lined up in support for this proposition were director Steven Spielberg, U.S. Democratic Senator Barbara Boxer, Los Angeles Mayor Richard Riordan, the California Teachers Association, and the California Nurses Association.

This proposition was pushed through because of the growing effort to create a better education and child care for children ages 0 to 3 years. In 1994, Carnegie Corporations issued a report called ‘’”Starting Points: Meeting the needs of our Youngest Children.”’’ This report gave an overall look at the poor education and lack of quality care provided to young children around the country. People began to confront this problem of the connection between the development of children and that quality of care received.

There was an intense opposition to the proposition by the tobacco industry but even with the huge opposing campaign the proposition still passed with just over fifty percent of the California vote. In March 2000 California voters were asked to repeal but there was a seventy percent opposition which reflected a strong anti-tobacco bias and support of early childhood education.

Results by county: Yes: 50–60%; 60–70%; No: 50–60%; 60–70%; 70–80%

== Fiscal Impact ==
The fiscal impact of this amendment led to almost a double increase of revenue for the state, going from about $400 million up to $750 million the following years. This amendment reduced Proposition 99, health care and resources program revenue from about $18 million to about $7 million the following years. In the state general fund and the county generals funds the revenue for both about doubled. This also brought about a potential savings for many programs in relation to education and health care along with many other programs.

== Implementation ==
The Tobacco Tax helped to create several things that would benefit the community of families with children under the age of 6. These programs included a statewide commission that would provide information to families and the rest of the public about and a plan to establish better quality child care throughout the state of California. There have also been individual county commissions established for each of the 58 counties in California. These county commissions will allow each of the programs established through Proposition 10 to better meet the needs of the individual communities. The tax also allowed for a trust fund for the money from the tax so that the money could be distributed among the county commissions and applied to the programs.

These programs provide funding for community health care, better quality child care and advanced education programs for families. Each program will be customized to fit the needs of the community that it is serving. A statewide campaign was also set up to emphasize the importance of providing excellent child care and education environment for early childhood development. The programs also provide assistance to pregnant women and parents of young children who are trying to quit smoking.

The main services provided to the families of California include education to inform parents about the importance of a nurturing environment starting from a young age. There are services that provide caregivers and parents with the skills to provide adequate nurture for children. Nutrition services are provided for prenatal and postnatal maternal and for the infancy stage. There are also programs that provide other child development related services, health care and social services not provided but other major programs. There are services to that provide education and training about how to avoid using tobacco products, alcoholic beverages and other harmful drugs during pregnancy. Along with these services there is also a program that assists in preventing domestic violence, and also provides treatment for those who have already been abused in the home.

These services are not restricted by income, residency, race, or other common deciding factors, but are available to anyone who has children from the pre-natal stage to the age of five. These services are provided strictly to allow each child to have a strong start to life in nurturing environments that will allow them to succeed later in life.

== First 5 California ==
The First 5 California Commission was the commission established Proposition 10, in January 1999. Another name for this program is the California Children and Families Commission. First 5 offers services such as health care, child care and other programs to the families of California. First 5 have about eight main goals that they strive to address. These goals are school readiness, making sure that all kids have a good transition into elementary school, quality child care in the early years so that each child receives the proper care from child care facilities, emphasis on nutrition and exercise to encourage healthy life styles, health coverage for children to ensure their vaccinations and other health needs are met starting young, dental care so that children maintain a healthy smile and even avoid things such as speech impairments, providing quality pre-schools for good brain stimulation, care for children with special needs, and even the migrant farm workers children. All of these goals have been established as some of the leading contributors to a successful life. Not only does California have a state commission but each of the fifty eight counties of the state has their own branch of the commission to better suit the needs of the local communities.
