= 2016 California Proposition 53 =

Proposition 53
- Voter Approval of Revenue Bonds

Results
Choice	Votes	%
Yes	6,508,909	49.42%
No	6,660,555	50.58%
Valid votes	13,169,464	90.14%
Invalid or blank votes	1,441,045	9.86%
Total votes	14,610,509	100.00%
Registered voters/turnout	19,411,771	75.27%
County results
Yes
50–60%
60–70%
No
50–60%
60-70%

Proposition 53 was a California ballot proposition on the November 8, 2016 ballot. It would have required voter approval for issuing revenue bonds exceeding $2 billion.

Arguments in favor of the measure stated that it would require politicians to provide estimates of how much a project would cost, as well as give voters a say before taking on large debt. The measure followed similar practice as with general obligation bonds, which currently require voter approval before the state can use them to pay for a project. Arguments against the measure stated that it would negatively impact local control over projects by allowing statewide votes on smaller community projects. Additionally, the term project was not defined and it was unclear which projects might be affected by the measure. Cities, counties, schools districts, and community college districts were specifically excluded from the measure’s definition of “state”. However, the California Legislative Analyst's Office warned that local governments sometimes partner with the state government to get lower interest rates on government bonds, which could have required statewide voter approval of local projects under the measure.

It was unlikely that many projects would have been affected by the measure, though it could have affected large-scale projects such as California High-Speed Rail and California Water Fix and Eco Restore.

Proponents spent $4.6 million fighting for the measure, all of it from California Delta farmer Dino Cortopassi and his wife. Cortopassi has been an outspoken critic of the planned Water Fix tunnels underneath the delta.

Opponents spent $10.9 million fighting against the measure, with the top donor being $4.1 million from Governor Jerry Brown’s 2014 campaign funds. Other top opposition donors included the California Democratic Party, a labor coalition, venture capitalist John Doerr, and the San Manuel Band of Mission Indians.

The measure was opposed by the editorial boards of the Los Angeles Times, the San Francisco Chronicle, and The Sacramento Bee. Firefighters opposed the measure, warning that there was no exemption for disaster funding. Cities and local water districts were also opposed.
