= 1988 California Proposition 99 =

Referendum on tobacco taxes

Proposition 99
- November 8, 1988
- Cigarette and Tobacco Tax. Benefit Fund.

Results
Choice	Votes	%
Yes	5,607,387	58.17%
No	4,032,644	41.83%
County results
Yes
60–70%
50–60%
No
50–60%

Proposition 99 is an initiative statute which appeared on the November 8th, 1988 California general election ballot, as the Tobacco Tax and Health Protection Act.

== Overview ==
It was passed by a majority vote of the electorate. Its primary effect is to impose a 25-cent per pack state excise tax on the sale of tobacco cigarettes within California, with approximately equivalent excise taxes similarly imposed on the retail sale of other commercial tobacco products, such as cigars and chewing tobacco. Additional restrictions placed on the sale of tobacco include a ban on cigarette vending machines in public areas accessible by juveniles, and a ban on the individual sale of single cigarettes. Revenue generated by the act was earmarked for various environmental and health care programs, and anti-tobacco advertisements.

== Impact ==
A detailed history of Proposition 99 and its success in reducing smoking is in the book Tobacco War. In its first 15 years (through 2004), the program reduced heart disease deaths and lung cancer incidence and reduced California health care costs by an estimated $86 billion.
