= Wayne Colburn =

American law enforcement officer (born 1916)

Wayne Berdell Coburn

Director of the United States Marshals Service
- In office January 16, 1970 – May 23, 1976
- Appointed by: Richard M. Nixon
- Preceded by: Office established
- Succeeded by: William E. Hall

United States Marshal for the Southern District of California
- In office September 19, 1966 – January 11, 1970
- Appointed by: Lyndon B. Johnson
- Preceded by: George E. O'Brien
- Succeeded by: Donald D. Hill

Personal details
- Born: November 28, 1916 Shamrock, Oklahoma, U.S.
- Died: June 19, 1983 San Diego, California, U.S.
- Education: San Diego City College (AA)

Wayne Colburn spent 34 years in the field of law enforcement and served as Director of the United States Marshals Service from January 1970 to May 1976.

At the time of his retirement, then Deputy Attorney General Harold R. Tyler Jr. said, "Wayne Colburn's contributions to the professionalism of the Marshals Service have been magnificent."

== Early life and education ==
Colburn was born in rural Oklahoma. After the passing of his father, the Colburn family moved to Los Angeles. Following high school, Wayne enlisted in the United States Marine Corps, seeing service in Shanghai, China in 1935.

After leaving military service, Colburn received a degree in police science at San Diego City College. With this degree, he began on his career as a law enforcement officer.

== Career ==
In 1942, Colburn joined the San Diego Police Department. With the exception of a recall to military service during World War II, he served this department until his 1966 appointment as a United States Marshal.

During his time in San Diego, he often took difficult postings and sought out additional training. His effectiveness was rewarded by promotions to sergeant in 1950, lieutenant in 1953, and captain in 1957.

With a promotion to inspector in 1962, Colburn experienced a variety of situations requiring quick thinking, effective plans, and smart utilization of resources. The attention he received brought him to the attention of federal law enforcement.

=== Office of United States Marshal ===
As a result of the work performed by Colburn as a law enforcement leader, President Johnson appointed him as the United States Marshal for the Southern District of California in 1966. As the chief federal law enforcement officer in southern California, Colburn was able to have an effect locally and nationally.

Following the 1969 designation of the United States Marshals Service as a separate agency within the Department of Justice, the Attorney General of the United States selected Marshal Colburn to become Director of the United States Marshals Service.

Colburn is often credited with many modernization efforts seen in the agency during the 1970s and 1980s as the Office of United States Marshal began to take on a more active role in federal law enforcement. He oversaw increased pay and improved training for deputies, a greater sense of organizational unity (as opposed to more than 90 individual district offices), and improved capabilities for the agency.

Early in his tenure, Colburn authorized the establishment of the U.S. Marshals Service Special Operations Group (SOG). His leadership and the quality of SOG training was very effective during the 1973 Wounded Knee Occupation at Wounded Knee, South Dakota in 1973.

Colburn retired from the position of Director in 1976 and returned to San Diego, California.

== Sources ==
- Calhoun, Frederick S. (1989). The Lawmen: United States Marshals and Their Deputies. Smithsonian Institution Press. ISBN 0874743966.
- Turk, David S. (2016). Forging the Star: The Official Modern History of the United States Marshals Service. University of North Texas Press. ISBN 9781574416541.
