= Director of the United States Marshals Service =

Chief executive of the United States Marshals Service

- Seal of the Marshals Service

- Flag of the Marshals Service

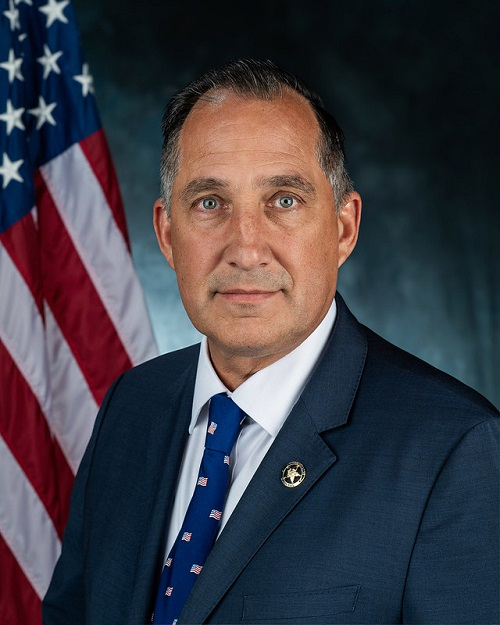
- Incumbent; Gadyaces S. Serralta since August 1, 2025
- United States Marshals Service
- Status: Chief executive
- Reports to: United States Attorney General
- Seat: Crystal City, Arlington, Virginia
- Appointer: The president with Senate advice and consent
- Term length: No fixed term
- Constituting instrument: 28 U.S.C. § 561
- Formation: December 20, 1957
- First holder: Clive W. Palmer September 11, 1999
- Deputy: Deputy Director
- Salary: Executive Schedule, level IV
- Website: www.usmarshals.gov

The director of the United States Marshals Service, abbreviated USMS director, is the head of the United States Marshals Service (USMS). The director oversees and manages the operations of the Marshals Service and directly superintends the various United States Marshals, which lead all USMS personnel within their respective federal judicial district. The director was originally referred to as "Chief United States Marshal" from 1957 to 1970.

The director of the Marshals Service is appointed by the president of the United States, with the advice and consent of the Senate. The director reports to the attorney general.

== Powers and duties ==
28 U.S.C. § 561 establishes the United States Marshals Service, abbreviated USMS, as a bureau of the U.S. Department of Justice and places a director at its helm. The director – like any other high-ranking executive branch officer – is directly appointed by the president, with the advice and consent of the Senate, and serves under the authority and control of the United States Attorney General.

The director is responsible for the supervision and direction of the Marshals Service "in the performance of its duties". All United States Marshals, the local heads of the USMS, report to the director. Additionally, the director may exercise any functions delegated to them by the Attorney General.

28 U.S.C. § 561 requires the director to consult with the Judicial Conference of the United States on a continuing basis to discuss the security-related needs of the federal judiciary. This clause serves to ensure that the views of the judiciary are taken into account when it comes to staff assignment, policy priorities, allocation of resources, and so-called "judicial security" in general, which includes the safeguarding of federal courthouses and other buildings accommodating the judiciary, as well as the personal safety of, and the assessment of threats made to, judicial officers, and the protection of all other judicial personnel.

Furthermore, chapter 37 of the U.S. Code empowers the director to designate the stations and offices of the U.S. Marshals, appoint complementary personnel and fix their compensation, and administer oaths and take affirmations of officers and employees of the Marshals Service.

== List of officeholders ==
Denotes acting officeholders

Nr.	Portrait	Name	Entered office	Left office (Note: Only the date of appointment has been officially documented and displayed by the USMS; vacancies (as a result of death for example) thus may render the date a director left office incorrect.)	Notes
Chief United States Marshals (1957–1970)
1		Clive W. Palmer (Note: Full title was: Head (Chief), Executive Office for United States Marshals)	December 20, 1957	June 21, 1962	
2		James J. P. McShane (Note: Full title was: Head (Chief), Executive Office for United States Marshals)	June 21, 1962	March 5, 1969	
3		Carl C. Turner (Note: Full title was: Chief, Executive Office for United States Marshals)	March 5, 1969	September 4, 1969	
Directors of the Marshals Service (1970–present)
1		Wayne B. Colburn	January 16, 1970	May 23, 1976	
2		William E. Hall	May 23, 1976	October 23, 1983	
3		Stanley E. Morris	October 23, 1983	November 6, 1989	
4		Kevin Michael Moore	November 6, 1989	February 24, 1992	
5		Henry E. Hudson	February 24, 1992	August 12, 1992	
5		Henry E. Hudson	August 12, 1992	October 17, 1993	
–		John J. Twomey	October 17, 1993	November 18, 1993	
6		Eduardo Gonzalez	November 18, 1993	June 21, 1999	
–		George Ray Havens	June 21, 1999	November 17, 1999	
7		John W. Marshall	November 17, 1999	January 21, 2001	
–		Louie McKinney	January 21, 2001	October 30, 2001	
8		Benigno G. Reyna	October 30, 2001	August 1, 2005	
9		John F. Clark	August 1, 2005	March 17, 2006	
9		John F. Clark	March 17, 2006	December 31, 2010	
10		Stacia A. Hylton	December 31, 2010	July 26, 2015	
–		David Harlow	July 26, 2015	January 4, 2018	
–		David Anderson (Note: Full title was: Acting Deputy Director)	January 4, 2018	March 29, 2019	
11		Donald W. Washington	March 29, 2019	September 27, 2021	
12		Ronald L. Davis	September 27, 2021	January 17, 2025	
–		Mark Pittella (Note: Full title was: Deputy Director)	January 20, 2025	July 31, 2025	
13		Gadyaces S. Serralta	August 1, 2025	Present	

== Deputies ==
The deputy director of the Marshals Service is the principal deputy to the director and oversees the chief of district affairs and the Office of Professional Responsibility.

The associate director for operations oversees the Investigative Operations Division, Judicial Security Division, Tactical Operations Division, Justice Prisoner Air Transportation System, Witness Security Division, and the Prisoner Operations Division.

The associate director for administration oversees the Training Division, Human Resources Division, Information Technology Division, Office of Public and Congressional Affairs, Management Support Division, Asset Forfeiture Division.

== See also ==
- Chief, IRS Criminal Investigation
- Director of the Central Intelligence Agency
- Director of the Federal Bureau of Investigation
- Director of the United States Secret Service
- Federal law enforcement in the United States
