= List of killings by law enforcement officers in the United States in the 19th century =

This is a list of people reported killed by non-military law enforcement officers in the United States in the 19th century, whether in the line of duty or not, and regardless of reason or method. The listing documents the occurrence of a death, making no implications regarding wrongdoing or justification on the part of the person killed or officer involved. Killings are arranged by date of the incident that caused death. Different death dates, if known, are noted in the description. This page lists 112 people.

== 19th century ==
The table below lists 113 people.

Date	Name (age) of deceased	State (political subdivision)	Description
1899-12-25	Harvey Dodd	Missouri (Jefferson City)	As an officer arrested a woman, Dodd shot at the officer, but missed. The officer shot him twice.
1899-12-25	William Thomas	Alabama (Birmingham)	Thomas assaulted an officer responding to a disturbance. The officer shot him five times.
1899-10-29	Henderson Wyatt	Georgia (Columbus)	Wyatt assaulted an officer responding to a burglary. The officer fatally shot him.
1899-10-08	unidentified male	California (Alameda)	Police responding to a burglary were shot at by three men. Two officers were wounded before one officer shot and killed one of the suspects. Another was arrested, while a third escaped.
1899-08-21	James Birch	Indiana (Indianapolis)	Birch was shot by an officer after he shot and injured the policeman.
1899-07-22	Michael O'Donnell	Illinois (Chicago)	O'Donnell was shot by an officer when he and a friend refused to alight from a train they were freighthopping.
1899-06-28	Hugh Gerah	Oklahoma (Tecumseh)	Gerah was shot and killed by a policeman, who was arrested.
1899-05-17	unidentified male	Illinois (Chicago)	A policeman was assaulted by several Italian men on Polk Street. The officer fired into the crowd, killing a man and wounding two others.
1899-02-18	Harry Sloan	Kentucky (Enterprise)	
1899-02-10	William Harvey (32)	Massachusetts (Worcester)	Patrolman Ira F. Goodwin fired a shot at a fleeing suspect who had allegedly failed to heed verbal commands and a warning shot. Harvey, an uninvolved passerby, was struck by the bullet and died several minutes later. Goodwin was arrested and charged with manslaughter. Goodwin was formally indicted, but his case was adjourned and he returned to duty in February 1900.
1899-02-10	Edward Leach	Illinois (Chicago)	Leach, a police officer, was fatally shot by Patrick Furlong, another officer, after a political quarrel.
1898-12-26	unnamed Black man	North Carolina (Raleigh)	
1898-12-21	Jacob Lambert	Kentucky (Middlesboro)	
1898-12-21	Geer or Greer	Kentucky (Middlesboro)	
1898-12-21	unknown man	Kentucky (Middlesboro)	
1898-12-11	Charles Tracy (16)	Indiana (Indianapolis)	
1898-11-22	Private Patton	Tennessee (Knoxville)	
1898-10-10	Howard Clark	Kentucky (Owensboro)	
1898-10-10	Hattie Mahoney	Kentucky (Owensboro)	
1898-09-12	Edward Alex Callaghan	Texas (Galveston)	
1898-08-16	unnamed man	Pennsylvania (Clearfield)	
1898-08-15	Wm. Johnson	Ohio/Oklahoma/Oregon (?) (Springfield)	
1898-08-09	Frank Kante	Missouri (St Louis)	
1898-08-08	J. E. Loughridge	Arkansas (El Dorado)	
1898-08-06	J. Nelson	Montana (Helena)	
1898-07-26	Sanders Kirby	Kentucky (Paducah)	
1898-07-11	unnamed Black man	Georgia (Atlanta)	
1898-05-16 (?)	William Stewart (17)	Kansas (Kansas City)	
1897-12-15	James Merriweather	Arkansas (Hamburg)	
1897-10-27	Thomas M. Howe	Rhode Island (Providence)	Howe, who was intoxicated, shot and wounded an officer who attempted to guide him home. The officer chased Howe into the woods as Howe fired at him and shot Howe, who died at the scene.
1897-09-10	Michael Cheslock	Pennsylvania (Hazleton)	Lattimer massacre
1897-09-10	Sebastian Bozestoski (35)	Pennsylvania (Hazleton)	Lattimer massacre
1897-09-10	John Chobonshi (23)	Pennsylvania (Hazleton)	Lattimer massacre
1897-09-10	Adalbert Czaja (27)	Pennsylvania (Hazleton)	Lattimer massacre
1897-09-10	John Futa (29)	Pennsylvania (Hazleton)	Lattimer massacre
1897-09-10	John Gastack (32)	Pennsylvania (Hazleton)	Lattimer massacre
1897-09-10	Antonio Grazke (33)	Pennsylvania (Hazleton)	Lattimer massacre
1897-09-10	Frank Kodel (24)	Pennsylvania (Hazleton)	Lattimer massacre
1897-09-10	Andrew Kollick (30)	Pennsylvania (Hazleton)	Lattimer massacre
1897-09-10	Andre Nikzkowuski (27)	Pennsylvania (Hazleton)	Lattimer massacre
1897-09-10	Rulof Rekenits (35)	Pennsylvania (Hazleton)	Lattimer massacre
1897-09-10	John Ruski (28)	Pennsylvania (Hazleton)	Lattimer massacre
1897-09-10	John Sheka (27)	Pennsylvania (Hazleton)	Lattimer massacre
1897-09-10	John Tranke (32)	Pennsylvania (Hazleton)	Lattimer massacre
1897-09-10	John Turnasdich (27)	Pennsylvania (Hazleton)	Lattimer massacre
1897-09-10	Stephen Urich (27)	Pennsylvania (Hazleton)	Lattimer massacre
1897-09-10	Andrew Varicku (28)	Pennsylvania (Hazleton)	Lattimer massacre
1897-09-10	Andrew Yerkman (31)	Pennsylvania (Hazleton)	Lattimer massacre
1897-09-10	Stanley Zagorski (45)	Pennsylvania (Hazleton)	Lattimer massacre
1897-09-10	Adam Zamoski (26)	Pennsylvania (Hazleton)	Lattimer massacre
1897-09-10	Andrew Zeminski (31)	Pennsylvania (Hazleton)	Lattimer massacre
1897-09-10	John Zernovick (33)	Pennsylvania (Hazleton)	Lattimer massacre
1897-03-09	Henry Sullivan	California (San Francisco)	Sullivan was shot two times by Policeman George Dougherty, who then attempted suicide by shooting himself in the head.
1896-11-15	Cy Moore	Missouri (Keytesville)	
1896-09-09	James Linhart (5)	Illinois (Chicago)	
1896-04-24	John Schanlon	Kansas (Atchison)	
1895-03-09	Jim "Riley" Freeman	Iowa (Boone)	
1895-03-09	Tim Lanman	Iowa (Boone)	
1895-02-02	Maurice D. Fenton	Massachusetts (Holyoke)	
1895-01-08	James Smith	Oklahoma (South Enid)	
1895-01-08	James Brown	Oklahoma (South Enid)	
1894-12-25	Charles Gallagher	Pennsylvania (Philadelphia)	Gallagher, along with John Morell and William Slaar, assaulted an officer attempting to arrest a friend named William Brown. The officer opened fire, killing Gallagher.
1894-12-15	Unnamed person	Alabama (Birmingham)	Two alleged horse thieves were killed by officers.
1894-12-15	Unnamed person	Alabama (Birmingham)	Two alleged horse thieves were killed by officers.
1895-12-14	Lizzie Durr (13)	Birmingham, Alabama	A police officer shot and killed Durr as she and a friend gathered coal from a train car. The officer claimed Durr jumped on him, causing his gun to discharge, but Durr's friend claimed she was shot while they were running away. Durr had been shot in the back of the head.
1894-09-27	Unnamed man	Utah (Salt Lake City)	
1894-09-27	Unnamed man	Utah (Salt Lake City)	
1894-09-20	Unnamed Italian man	Tennessee (Bristol)	
1894-08-21	Edward Saxson	Pennsylvania (Philadelphia)	
1894-08-01	Jennie Jones	Pennsylvania (Phillipsburg)	Jones, the wife of a striking coal miner, was shot and killed by deputy sheriff James Meyers.
1894-07-14	Unnamed Italian man	New Jersey (Hoboken)	
1894-06-28	Elmer Schmidt	California (Sacramento)	Schmidt was shot as he fled arrest.
1994-06-14	Eddinger	California (Cottonwood)	
1894-05-12	Joseph Schnellbach	New York (Manhattan)	
1894-05-09	Unnamed man	Michigan (Bay City)	
1894-04-18	Unnamed striker	Michigan (Detroit)	
1894-04-18	Unnamed striker	Michigan (Detroit)	
1894-03-20	Jack Hippart Jr.	Florida (Jacksonville)	
1894-03-20	Jack Hippart Sr.	Florida (Jacksonville)	
1894-01-31	Charles Arado	Illinois (Chicago)	
1893-09-28	R. G. Harris	Arizona (Phoenix)	
1893-09-28	Bob Dunlap	Arizona (Phoenix)	
1893-05-09	John Elks	Pennsylvania (Greensburg)	
1893-05-09	Unnamed Hungarian man	Pennsylvania (Greensburg)	
1893-05-09	Unnamed Hungarian man	Pennsylvania (Greensburg)	
1892-12-07	M. V. Sherrell	Alabama (Birmingham)	
1892-11-16	John Eaton	North Carolina (Mocksville)	
1892-11-05	Ned Christie	Oklahoma (Tahlequah)	
1892-06-29	Robert Kirlin	California (San Francisco)	Kirlin attempted to stab an officer with a cheese knife and was shot dead.
1891-11-27	surname Parker	Utah (Salt Lake City)	Parker, a police captain, disputed with another officer, Albright. Parker attempted to shoot Albright with a revolver, and Albright shot Parker dead.
1891-02-11	John May	California (San Francisco)	May was shot in the back and killed as he ran away from police. The officer responsible said that he only meant to scare May.
1890-12-15	Sitting Bull	South Dakota (Standing Rock Indian Reservation)	Death of Sitting Bull
1890-11-03	James Edwards	Tennessee (Kingston)	Edwards and town marshal John M. Webster Jr. fatally shot each other as Webster attempted to arrest Edwards.
1890-09-30	John Davenport (11)	Massachusetts (Boston)	A patrolman heard a noise from a residential yard and saw two people fleeing the area. According to the officer, after verbal commands failed, he fired a shot to frighten the suspects, which fatally wounded Davenport.
1890-03-17	John McCann	Colorado (Monte Visto)	
1890-03-17	Charles Harris	Colorado (Monte Visto)	
1890-03-17	Thomas Gallagher	Colorado (Monte Visto)	
1890-03-07	B. Robertson	Kansas (Valley Falls)	
1889‑08‑14	David S. Terry (66)	California (Lathrop)	Chief Justice of California David S. Terry attempted to assault U.S. Supreme Court Justice Stephen Johnson Field at a train station in Lathrop, California. Field's bodyguard, U.S. Marshal David Neagle, shot and killed Terry. This event led to the U.S. Supreme Court decision In re Neagle.
1889-04-23	"Burris"	Arkansas (Little Rock)	
1888-07-05	Mike Laughlin	Nebraska (Benkleman)	
1888-07-03	James McGeorge	Kentucky (Louisville)	While intoxicated, two Deputies began fighting each other, leading to a struggle over McGeorges weapon.
1888-07-03	Bill Smith	Kentucky (Louisville)	While intoxicated, two Deputies began fighting each other, leading to a struggle over McGeorges weapon.
1888-05-01	John Reardon	Kansas (Olatus)	
1884-09-27	Thomas Callahan	Massachusetts (Boston)	While an officer arrested an intoxicated man, several of the detainee's friends, including Callahan, attacked the officer in an attempt to free their friend. According to the officer, he fired three shots into the ground in order to scare his attackers, which struck Callahan and killed him.
1879-04-22	John M. Dent	Mississippi (Vicksburg)	
1872-07-28	Matthew Madden	New York (Manhattan)	An officer shot into a crowd and fatally wounded Madden.
1870-03-31	Henry Truman(26)	Philadelphia, Pennsylvania	Officer John Whiteside chased Truman into an alley after a shoplifting. When Truman asked the officer what he did wrong, Whiteside shot him. Whiteside was found guilty of manslaughter.
1858‑11‑10	John Hollis	New York (Manhattan)	Longshoreman Hollis allegedly threatened to kill ship captain Thomas Conway for not giving him a job on his crew. Conway called police. Officer Robert Cairnes responded, and Hollis ran away. Cairnes pursued, firing his pistol after him. Two shots missed, before a cartman grabbed Hollis's collar and held him. Cairnes ran up exclaiming, "You will get away from me, will you?" and shot directly into Hollis's back, so close that his coat caught fire. A coroner's jury ruled the fatal shooting was not justifiable, but a grand jury declined to indict the officer.
1855-05-21	Freeman	Missouri (St. Louis)	Freeman, a free Black man and abolitionist, was killed by police while trying to help slaves escape from captivity in Missouri.
1853-11-16	John Ragin	Ohio (Cincinnati)	
1852-05-04	James Gillespie	Pennsylvania (Philadelphia)	
1852-01-29	Warren C. Norris	California (San Francisco)	

== See also ==
- Death in custody § United States
- Henry A. Wallace Police Crime Public Database
- List of cases of police brutality
- List of countries with annual rates and counts for killings by law enforcement officers
- List of law enforcement officers killed in the line of duty in the United States
- List of law enforcement officers convicted for an on-duty killing in the United States
- List of shootings by US immigration agents
- List of police reforms related to the George Floyd protests
- List of unarmed African Americans killed by law enforcement officers in the United States
- Lists of killings by law enforcement officers
- Police brutality in the United States
- Police misconduct § United States
- Police riot § United States
- Police use of deadly force in the United States
