= Gadyaces S. Serralta =

Director of the U.S. Marshals Service

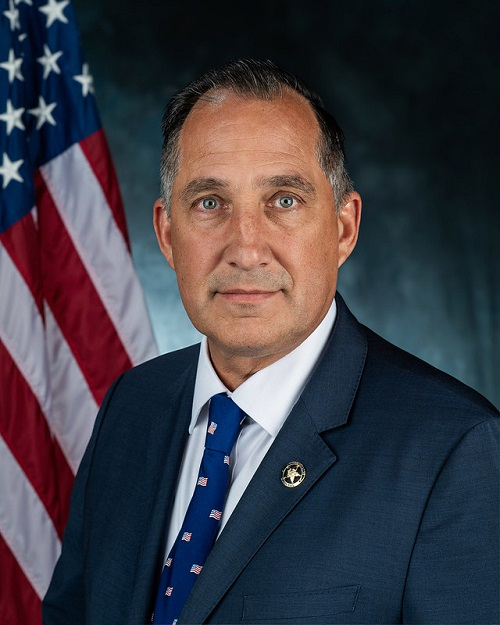

13th Director of the United States Marshals Service
- Incumbent
- Assumed office August 1, 2025
- President: Donald Trump
- Deputy: Stephanie Creasy
- Preceded by: Ronald L. Davis

Personal details
- Education: Florida International University (BCJ); Nova Southeastern University (MS)

Gadyaces S. Serralta is an American law enforcement officer and government official, serving since August 1, 2025 as Director of the U.S. Marshals Service.

== Education ==
Serralta received a B.S. in Criminal Justice Studies from Florida International University and a M.S. in Leadership from Nova Southeastern University.

== Career ==
Serralta began his law enforcement career with the Miami-Dade Police Department in 1990. He served as a Patrol Officer and Sergeant, working primarily with the Criminal Street Gangs Unit and Organized Crime Section, and then served as a Lieutenant in charge of the Robbery Intervention and Narcotics Detail, before assuming the position of Major. He also served as the Police Chief for the Palmetto Bay Policing Unit in the city of Palmetto Bay, Florida.
