= Donald W. Washington =

American attorney (born 1955)

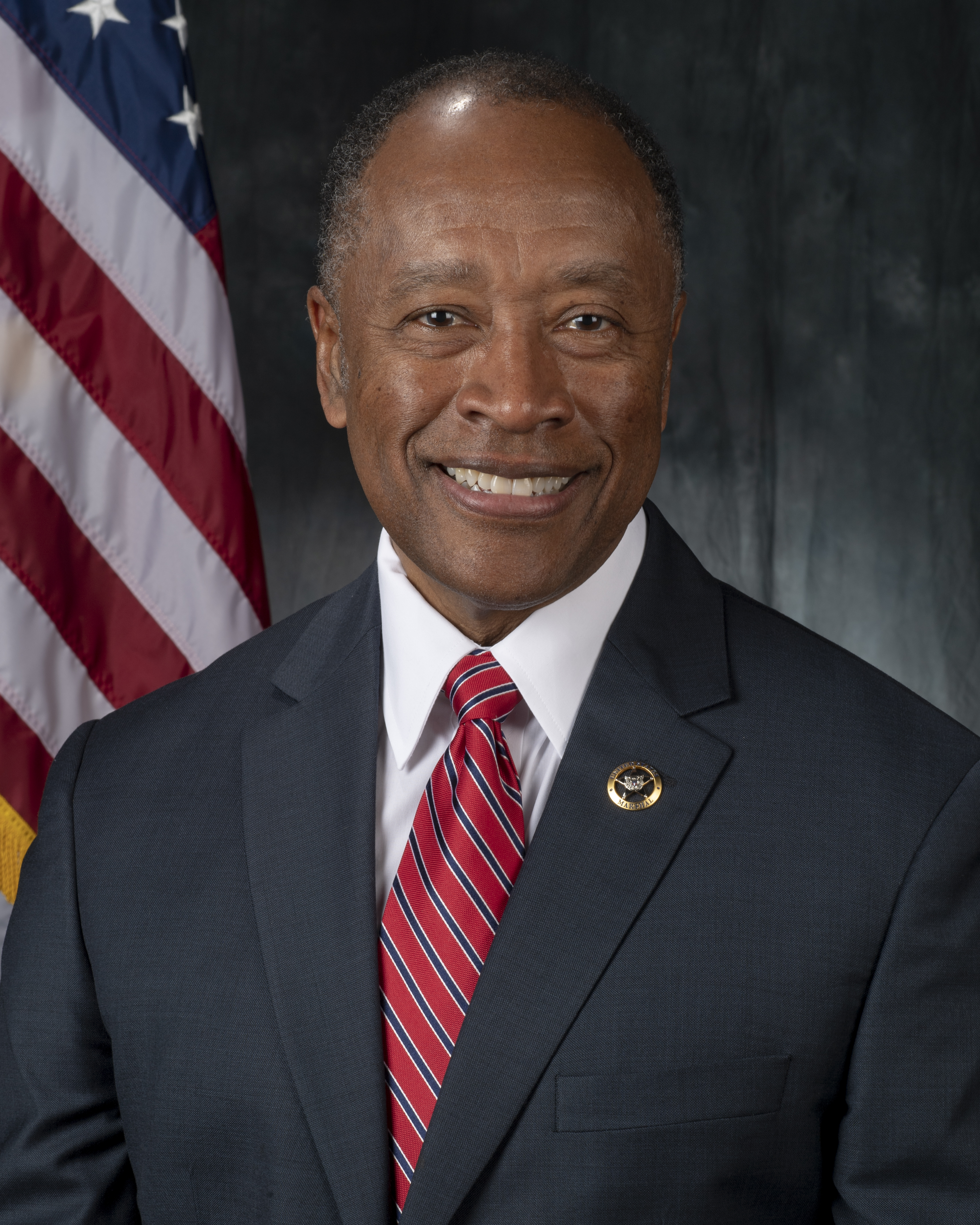

11th Director of the United States Marshals Service
- In office March 29, 2019 – September 27, 2021
- President: Donald Trump; Joe Biden
- Deputy: Derrick Driscoll
- Preceded by: Stacia A. Hylton
- Succeeded by: Ronald L. Davis

United States Attorney for the Western District of Louisiana
- In office September 2001 – June 2, 2010
- President: George W. Bush; Barack Obama
- Preceded by: Donald Ellsworth Walter
- Succeeded by: Stephanie A. Finley

Personal details
- Born: January 29, 1955 (age 71) Sulphur Springs, Texas, U.S.
- Education: United States Military Academy (BS); South Texas College of Law (JD)

Military service
- Allegiance: United States
- Branch/service: United States Army; Army Reserve
- Years of service: 1977–1986
- Rank: Captain

Donald Wayne Washington (born January 29, 1955) is an American attorney who served as the 11th director of the United States Marshals Service from March 2019 to September 2021. He previously served as United States Attorney for the Western District of Louisiana, from to 2001 to 2010.

== Early life and military service ==
Born in Sulphur Springs, Texas, Washington graduated from the United States Military Academy with a B.S. degree in engineering in June 1977 and was commissioned an officer in the United States Army air defense artillery. He served on active duty in the United States and South Korea until June 1982 and then in the United States Army Reserve in Texas until 1986, retiring as a captain.

== Career ==
In 1982, Washington moved to the private sector and began working as an engineer for the American oil company Conoco Inc. In 1983, he began studying for an M.S. degree in engineering at McNeese State University but received a job transfer in 1984 before graduating.

Beginning in May 1986, he attended the South Texas College of Law, began working as a corporate law clerk in 1987 and graduated in December 1989 with a Juris Doctor. Now a lawyer, Washington started serving in corporate and private practice, until he was appointed U.S. Attorney for the Western District of Louisiana by President George W. Bush.

On October 2, 2018, Washington was nominated by President Donald Trump to serve as director of the United States Marshals Service. He was confirmed by the Senate on March 14 and sworn in 15 days later. Washington is the 11th director of the Marshals Service, and succeeded acting Deputy Director David Anderson.

In June 2022, it was reported that Washington was a potential Republican candidate for Governor of Louisiana in the 2023 election.
