= David S. Turk =

American historian and author (born 1964)

David S. Turk (born 1964) is an American historian and author. His specialties are the areas of law enforcement, the Old West, the Civil Rights Era, and Virginia history.

== Early life and education ==
David Scott Turk was born in Washington, D.C., the son of Howard Turk, an economist, and Ann Elizabeth Bostic, a nurse. He is of East European and British ancestry. His paternal ancestors were of Jewish ethnicity, and his maternal ancestors settled in Virginia in the mid-1600s and for a time were neighbors to George Washington’s forebears in Westmoreland County, Virginia.

Turk was raised in Northern Virginia and attended local area schools. He received a bachelor's degree in business administration from Virginia’s Longwood College (now University) in 1987 and received a master’s degree in history from George Mason University in 1997. He married Janet Vogel in 1986, and they have one son.

== Career ==
Turk began working for the United States Marshals Service in early 1990 and became the assistant to the historian in 1991. Upon the departure of his predecessor, Turk became the agency’s historian in 2001. He has documented the agency’s history through articles, television production contributions, radio interviews, and a book. He has written and been interviewed about Bass Reeves, Billy the Kid, Frederick Douglass, and U.S. Marshals in the movies, among many other topics. Working with the Department of Justice Libraries, he developed programs for the 40th and 50th anniversaries of the integration of the University of Mississippi. In addition, he serves on the Board of Directors for the forthcoming U.S. Marshals Museum. Turk was the president of the George Mason University History Alumni Organization from 2005-06.

== Historical writing and consultation ==
The combination of genealogy and history has been a hallmark of Turk’s writing. An early interest in Virginia history and his own family’s split during the American Civil War led to his first book, "The Union Hole," published in 1994, which achieved lasting notice in western Virginia. He dabbled in biography with the book "Give My Kind Regards to the Ladies," published in 2001, about the little-known Littleton Q. Washington, a Washington, D.C., reporter who was formerly Confederate Secretary of State.

From 2003, Turk was drawn into western American history with the re-investigation of the death of Billy the Kid. At the invitation of Lincoln County Sheriff Tom Sullivan and Investigator Steve Sederwall, he was present when forensic tests were conducted on furniture associated with the outlaw’s showdown with Sheriff and Special Deputy Patrick Garrett by Dr. Henry Lee. His interest in the Lincoln County War led him to a series of articles on Billy the Kid’s associates for "Wild West" magazine and two books, "Blackwater Draw," published in 2011, and "Here Lies Billy the Kid," published in 2019. The former is notable for its investigative study (with Sederwall) on the March 1878 deaths of three men that crossed the Kid, which was earlier popularized in film with "Young Guns II."

After a decade of research and writing, Turk completed the modern history of the U.S. Marshals Service, "Forging the Star: The Official Modern History of the United States Marshals Service" in 2016. The book is a detailed study of the agency’s development from a district-based to a headquarters-based organization, which included the Civil Rights Era and operations during and after September 11, 2001.

== Bibliography ==
=== Books authored ===
- Here Lies Billy the Kid. Barto, Pennsylvania: Cold West Publishing. 2019. ISBN 978-0578515168
- Forging the Star: The Official Modern History of the United States Marshals Service. Denton, Texas: University of North Texas Press. 2016. ISBN 978-1574417975
- Blackwater Draw: Three Lives, Billy the Kid, and the Murders That Started the Lincoln County War. Sunstone Books. 2011. ISBN 978-0865347809
- A Family’s Path in America: The Lees and Their Continuing Legacy. Bowie, Maryland: Heritage Books. 2007. ISBN 978-0788438141
- Give My Kind Regards to the Ladies: The Life of Littleton Quinton Washington. Bowie, Maryland: Heritage Books. 2001. ISBN 978-0788418068
- The Memorialists: An Antebellum History of Alleghany, Craig and Monroe Counties of Western Virginia, 1812-1860. Bowie, Maryland: Heritage Books. 1997. ISBN 978-0788406874
- The Union Hole: Unionist Activity and Local Conflict in Western Virginia. Bowie, Maryland: Heritage Books. 1994. ISBN 978-0788400292

=== Selected articles ===
- "U.S. Marshal Stillwell Russell Fought Both Outlaws and Political Enemies," Wild West, June 2012.
- "The Search for Jessie Evans," (with Rick Parker), Wild West, August 2009.
- "A Brief Primer on the History of the U.S. Marshals Service," Federal Lawyer, August 2008.
- "Billy the Kid and the U.S. Marshals Service," Wild West, December 2006.
- "For the Love of Fine Books: Antebellum Library Companies in Virginia," Virginia Cavalcade, Winter 2000.
