= Robert Forsyth (law enforcement officer) =

US Continental Army officer

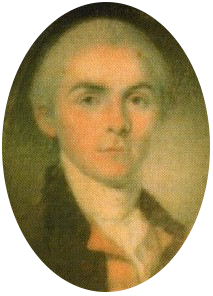
- Contemporary image of Robert Forsyth
- Born: 1754; Scotland, Kingdom of Great Britain
- Died: 11 January 1794 (aged 39–40); Augusta, Georgia, United States
- Cause of death: Gunshot wound to the head while serving civil process
- Burial place: St. Paul's Cemetery, Augusta, Georgia
- Occupations: Commissioned officer (major, Continental Army); United States Marshal
- Employer: United States Marshals Service
- Known for: First U.S. Marshal for the District of Georgia; the first U.S. federal law enforcement officer killed in the line of duty
- Title: United States Marshal for the District of Georgia
- Spouse(s): Fanny Forsyth (née Johnston, formerly Houston via her first husband)
- Children: Robert Forsyth, John Forsyth

Robert Forsyth (1754 – January 11, 1794) was a commissioned officer of the Continental Army during the American Revolutionary War, the first United States Marshal for the District of Georgia, and the first United States federal law enforcement officer to be killed in the line of duty. One of Forsyth's sons, John Forsyth, would go on to have a successful political career; serving as the 33rd governor of Georgia and as the 13th United States secretary of state.

== Early life ==
Forsyth was born in Scotland in 1754. As a teenager he emigrated with his family to North America; they first settled in New England and by 1774 had moved to Fredericksburg, Virginia. Forsyth married a widow, Fanny Houston (née Johnston), at some point before 1778 and would have two sons with her; Robert (born 1778) and John (born 1780).

== Military service ==
Shortly after the outbreak of the American Revolutionary War in 1776, Forsyth enlisted in the Continental Army at age 22. On January 10, 1779, he was commissioned a captain in Lee's Legion, a unit of light dragoons under (then-Major) Henry "Light‑Horse Harry" Lee. On March 21, 1781, Forsyth was promoted to major and was appointed the "deputy quartermaster-general of the Southern Army". Forsyth would later serve as an aide-de-camp to (then-General) George Washington.

== Post-war life ==
Forsyth returned to Fredericksburg and in 1785 relocated to Augusta, Georgia, where he became an active civic leader. He served on the Richmond County Board of Commissions, worked to secure a new county jail, and held local offices including tax assessor and justice of the peace. He was a trustee of Richmond Academy and, by 1792, owned approximately 6,000 acres of land. Forsyth was a member of the Society of the Cincinnati and an active Freemason, serving as Master of the Lodge Columbia and later as Deputy Grand Master for Georgia.

== United States Marshal ==
On September 26, 1789, President George Washington appointed Forsyth as the first United States Marshal for the (then-called) District of Georgia. He served in that office for more than four years and was among the original federal marshals appointed during the early years of the United States.

=== Death ===
On January 11, 1794, Marshal Forsyth, accompanied by two deputy marshals, went to the home of a "Mrs. Dixon" in Augusta to serve civil process on one Beverly Allen. Allen, originally from South Carolina, was described by the contemporary newspaper Columbian Gazetteer as being "a methodist [sic] preacher whose character is as vile as it is possible." Allen hid in an upstairs room. When Forsyth knocked at the door, Allen fired a pistol through an opening, striking Forsyth in the head, killing him instantly. Forsyth was 40 years old at the time of his death.

Allen was initially arrested but escaped custody twice and ultimately fled the state; he was never recaptured by authorities. Later archival research indicates Allen likely fled to Logan County, Kentucky, where he lived under an assumed identity, practiced medicine, acquired land, taught in the community, and died in February 1817.

== Legacy ==
Forsyth is considered to be the first federal law enforcement officer to be killed in the line-of-duty. As with all fallen law enforcement officers in the United States, Forsyth's name is listed on the National Law Enforcement Officers Memorial. A historical marker, funded by the Georgia Historical Society and the United States Marshals Service Association, was erected in Augusta, Georgia in 2008.

The "Robert Forsyth Valor Award", established in 1981, is the United States Marshals Service's highest award.

Forsyth was survived by his wife and two sons. A provision was made by the United States Congress in 1794 to provide his wife with $2,000 (accounting for inflation, about $60,000 in 2026).

His eldest son, Robert, would pass only a few years after Forsyth's murder, but his youngest son, John Forsyth, was a successful politician. John served as the 12th attorney general of Georgia, represented the state of Georgia in both the House of Representatives and the Senate, and also served as the 33rd governor of Georgia. As a supporter of the policies of President Andrew Jackson, Forsyth was appointed the 13th U.S. secretary of state by Jackson in 1834, and continued in that role until 1841 during the presidency of Martin Van Buren. He also served as the United States minister to Spain during the presidency of James Monroe.
