= Ronald L. Davis =

Director of the U.S. Marshals Service

Ron Davis
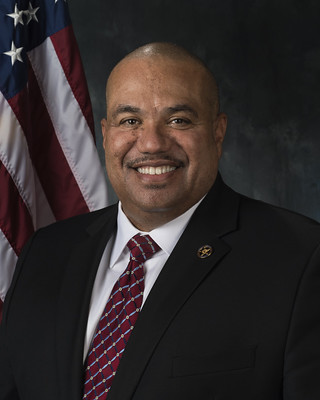

12th Director of the United States Marshals Service
- In office September 27, 2021 – January 17, 2025
- President: Joe Biden
- Deputy: Roberto I. Robinson
- Preceded by: Donald W. Washington
- Succeeded by: Mark Pittella (acting)

Personal details
- Born: Ronald Davis
- Education: Southern Illinois University Carbondale (BS)

Ronald L. Davis is an American law enforcement officer. He is a Former Director of the United States Marshals Service.

== Education ==
Davis earned a Bachelor of Science degree in workforce education and development from Southern Illinois University Carbondale.

== Career ==
Davis was an officer in the Oakland Police Department for 20 years and later served as chief of the East Palo Alto Police Department for eight years. In 2014, Davis was selected as executive director of the President's Task Force on 21st Century Policing. Davis later served as director of Community Oriented Policing Services in the United States Department of Justice.

On September 27, 2021, he was sworn in as Director of the United States Marshals Service which has its headquarters in Arlington, Virginia.
