= List of United States Supreme Court cases, volume 135 =

Supreme Court of the United States
- Interactive map of Supreme Court of the United States
- 38°53′26″N 77°00′16″W
- Established: March 4, 1789; 236 years ago
- Location: Washington, D.C.
- Coordinates: 38°53′26″N 77°00′16″W
- Composition method: Presidential nomination with Senate confirmation
- Authorised by: Constitution of the United States, Art. III, § 1
- Judge term length: life tenure, subject to impeachment and removal
- Number of positions: 9 (by statute)
- Website: supremecourt.gov

This is a list of cases reported in volume 135 of United States Reports, decided by the Supreme Court of the United States in 1890.

== Justices of the Supreme Court at the time of volume 135 U.S. ==
The Supreme Court is established by Article III, Section 1 of the Constitution of the United States, which says: "The judicial Power of the United States, shall be vested in one supreme Court . . .". The size of the Court is not specified; the Constitution leaves it to Congress to set the number of justices. Under the Judiciary Act of 1789 Congress originally fixed the number of justices at six (one chief justice and five associate justices). Since 1789 Congress has varied the size of the Court from six to seven, nine, ten, and back to nine justices (always including one chief justice).

When the cases in volume 135 U.S. were decided the Court comprised the following nine members:

Portrait	Justice	Office	Home State	Succeeded	Date confirmed by the Senate (Vote)	Tenure on Supreme Court
	Melville Fuller	Chief Justice	Illinois	Morrison Waite	July 20, 1888 (41–20)	October 8, 1888 – July 4, 1910 (Died)
	Samuel Freeman Miller	Associate Justice	Iowa	Peter Vivian Daniel	July 16, 1862 (Acclamation)	July 21, 1862 – October 13, 1890 (Died)
	Stephen Johnson Field	Associate Justice	California	newly created seat	March 10, 1863 (Acclamation)	May 10, 1863 – December 1, 1897 (Retired)
	Joseph P. Bradley	Associate Justice	New Jersey	newly created seat	March 21, 1870 (46–9)	March 23, 1870 – January 22, 1892 (Died)
	John Marshall Harlan	Associate Justice	Kentucky	David Davis	November 29, 1877 (Acclamation)	December 10, 1877 – October 14, 1911 (Died)
	Horace Gray	Associate Justice	Massachusetts	Nathan Clifford	December 20, 1881 (51–5)	January 9, 1882 – September 15, 1902 (Died)
	Samuel Blatchford	Associate Justice	New York	Ward Hunt	March 22, 1882 (Acclamation)	April 3, 1882 – July 7, 1893 (Died)
	Lucius Quintus Cincinnatus Lamar	Associate Justice	Mississippi	William Burnham Woods	January 16, 1888 (32–28)	January 18, 1888 – January 23, 1893 (Died)
	David Josiah Brewer	Associate Justice	Kansas	Stanley Matthews	December 18, 1889 (53–11)	January 6, 1890 – March 28, 1910 (Died)

== Notable Case in 135 U.S. ==
=== In re Neagle ===
In re Neagle, 135 U.S. 1 (1890), concerned the legal immunity of federal officers from state prosecution when acting within the scope of their federal authority. A U.S. Marshal, Neagle, was appointed by the United States Attorney General to serve as Justice Stephen J. Field's bodyguard while Field rode circuit in California. In 1889, on a train in California, a man known to have threatened Field with death due to an adverse legal decision struck Field with his fists. Knowing that the man had previously carried a knife and threatened Field with it, Neagle fatally shot the attacker, and was later arrested by a state sheriff. A federal court ordered that Neagle be released. On appeal, the U.S. Supreme Court affirmed, holding that, as the source of all Executive authority, the President could act in the absence of specific statutory authority since there were no laws that provided for protection of federal judges by the Executive branch. Constitutionally, the decision determined that the Executive branch, like Congress, exercised its own "necessary and proper" authority.

== Citation style ==
Under the Judiciary Act of 1789 the federal court structure at the time comprised District Courts, which had general trial jurisdiction; Circuit Courts, which had mixed trial and appellate (from the US District Courts) jurisdiction; and the United States Supreme Court, which had appellate jurisdiction over the federal District and Circuit courts—and for certain issues over state courts. The Supreme Court also had limited original jurisdiction (i.e., in which cases could be filed directly with the Supreme Court without first having been heard by a lower federal or state court). There were one or more federal District Courts and/or Circuit Courts in each state, territory, or other geographical region.

Bluebook citation style is used for case names, citations, and jurisdictions.

- "C.C.D." = United States Circuit Court for the District of . . .
  - e.g.,"C.C.D.N.J." = United States Circuit Court for the District of New Jersey
- "D." = United States District Court for the District of . . .
  - e.g.,"D. Mass." = United States District Court for the District of Massachusetts
- "E." = Eastern; "M." = Middle; "N." = Northern; "S." = Southern; "W." = Western
  - e.g.,"C.C.S.D.N.Y." = United States Circuit Court for the Southern District of New York
  - e.g.,"M.D. Ala." = United States District Court for the Middle District of Alabama
- "Ct. Cl." = United States Court of Claims
- The abbreviation of a state's name alone indicates the highest appellate court in that state's judiciary at the time.
  - e.g.,"Pa." = Supreme Court of Pennsylvania
  - e.g.,"Me." = Supreme Judicial Court of Maine

== List of cases in volume 135 U.S. ==
Case Name	Page & year	Opinion of the Court	Concurring opinion(s)	Dissenting opinion(s)	Lower court	Disposition
In re Neagle	1 (1890)	Miller	none	Lamar	C.C.N.D. Cal.	affirmed
G. Leisy & Co. v. Hardin	100 (1890)	Fuller	none	Gray	Iowa	reversed
Lyng v. Michigan	161 (1890)	Fuller	none	none	Mich.	reversed
Mackall v. Mackall	167 (1890)	Brewer	none	none	Sup. Ct. D.C.	affirmed
Commercial Mfg. Co. v. Fairbank C. Co.	176 (1890)	Blatchford	none	none	C.C.N.D. Ill.	affirmed
Vicksburg, et al. Ry. Co. v. Smith	195 (1890)	Blatchford	none	none	C.C.W.D. La.	dismissed
United States ex rel. Miller v. Raum	200 (1890)	Bradley	none	none	Sup. Ct. D.C.	affirmed
Central T. Co. v. Grant Locomotive Works	207 (1890)	Fuller	none	none	C.C.S.D. Ohio	multiple
St. Germain v. Brunswick	227 (1890)	Fuller	none	none	C.C.D. Cal.	multiple
Lodge v. Twell	232 (1890)	Fuller	none	none	Sup. Ct. Terr. Mont.	dismissed
Hartranft v. Meyer & Dickinson	237 (1890)	Brewer	none	none	C.C.E.D. Pa.	affirmed
Eckloff v. District of Columbia	240 (1890)	Brewer	none	none	Sup. Ct. D.C.	affirmed
Beatty v. Benton	244 (1890)	Blatchford	none	none	Ga.	dismissed
United States v. Chase	255 (1890)	Lamar	none	none	C.C.D. Mass.	certification
In re Mills	263 (1890)	Harlan	none	none	W.D. Ark.	habeas corpus granted
United States v. Sanborn	271 (1890)	Harlan	none	none	C.C.D. Mass.	reversed
Iron S.M. Co. v. Campbell	286 (1890)	Miller	none	Brewer	C.C.D. Colo.	reversed
Societe F. et A. v. Milliken	304 (1890)	Brewer	none	none	C.C.N.D. Tex.	affirmed
Willard v. Wood	309 (1890)	Gray	none	none	Sup. Ct. D.C.	affirmed
Northern P.R.R. Co. v. Austin	315 (1890)	Fuller	none	none	Minn.	dismissed
Royer v. Schultz B. Co.	319 (1890)	Blatchford	none	none	C.C.E.D. Mo.	reversed
Mansfield v. Excelsior R. Co.	326 (1890)	Harlan	none	none	C.C.N.D. Ill.	reversed
Yale L. Mfg. Co. v. Berkshire Nat'l Bank	342 (1890)	Blatchford	none	none	C.C.D. Mass.	multiple
In re Baiz	403 (1890)	Fuller	none	none	S.D.N.Y.	prohibition denied
New York E.R.R. Co. v. Fifth Nat'l Bank	432 (1890)	Gray	none	none	C.C.S.D.N.Y.	affirmed
In re Lane	443 (1890)	Miller	none	none	D. Kan.	habeas corpus denied
Burns & Co. v. Rosenstein Bros.	449 (1890)	Harlan	none	none	C.C.D. Mass.	affirmed
Randolph's Ex'r v. Quidnick Co.	457 (1890)	Brewer	none	none	C.C.D.R.I.	affirmed
Upshur Cnty. v. Rich	467 (1890)	Bradley	none	none	C.C.D.W. Va.	reversed
Freiburg v. Dreyfus	478 (1890)	Brewer	none	none	C.C.E.D. La.	affirmed
Anderson v. Carkins	483 (1890)	Brewer	none	none	Neb.	reversed
City of Detroit v. Osborne	492 (1890)	Brewer	none	none	C.C.E.D. Mich.	reversed
Norman v. Buckner	500 (1890)	Brewer	none	none	C.C.W.D. La.	affirmed
West v. Camden	507 (1890)	Blatchford	none	none	C.C.D. Md.	affirmed
Robinson v. Iron Ry. Co.	522 (1890)	Blatchford	none	none	C.C.S.D. Ohio	affirmed
Glenn v. Liggett	533 (1890)	Blatchford	none	none	C.C.E.D. Mo.	reversed
United States v. Voorhees	550 (1890)	Lamar	none	none	C.C.D. Neb.	affirmed
Washington & G.R.R. Co. v. McDade	554 (1890)	Lamar	none	none	Sup. Ct. D.C.	affirmed
Des Moines et al. R.R. Co. v. Wabash, et al. Ry. Co.	576 (1890)	Miller	none	none	C.C.S.D. Iowa	affirmed
Haines v. McLaughlin	584 (1890)	Fuller	none	none	C.C.N.D. Cal.	affirmed
The Eclipse	599 (1890)	Fuller	none	none	Sup. Ct. Terr. Dakota	affirmed
Farrar v. Churchill	609 (1890)	Fuller	none	none	C.C.S.D. Miss.	affirmed
Riddle v. Whitehill	621 (1890)	Fuller	none	none	C.C.E.D. Ark.	reversed
Cherokee Nation v. Southern K. Ry. Co.	641 (1890)	Harlan	none	none	C.C.W.D. Ark.	reversed
McGahey v. Virginia	662 (1890)	Bradley	none	none	Va.	affirmed
