= John F. Clark =

9th Director of the United States Marshals Service

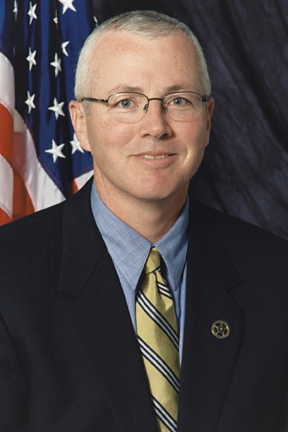

9th Director of the United States Marshals Service
- In office March 17, 2006 – December 31, 2010; Acting: August 1, 2005 – March 17, 2006
- President: George Bush; Barack Obama
- Preceded by: Benigno G. Reyna
- Succeeded by: Stacia A. Hylton

Personal details
- Education: Syracuse University (BS)

John F. Clark is an American law enforcement official and non-profit executive who served as the director of the United States Marshals Service, appointed to the position by president George W. Bush on March 17, 2006, and succeeded by Stacia Hylton in 2010. On January 3, 2010, Clark joined Lockheed Martin as director of security operations for information systems and global solutions.

== Education ==
Clark earned a Bachelor of Science degree from Syracuse University.

== Career ==
Clark he began his law enforcement career in June 1977 in the York, Maine, Police Department where he served for six years as a Police Officer until December 1983. Began his career with the United States Marshals Service in the San Francisco and San Jose offices of the United States District Court for the Northern District of California. He has held several other senior positions, including chief deputy U.S. marshal for the Eastern District of Virginia, chief inspector of the Internal Affairs Division, and chief inspector of the International Fugitive Investigations Division. He also served for seven years in the Special Operations Group. Before his employment with the U.S. Marshals, he was employed by the United States Capitol Police and the United States Border Patrol.

On January 3, 2010, Clark joined Lockheed Martin as their director of security operations for information systems and global solutions.

Clark was the CEO of the National Center for Missing & Exploited Children.
