= James J. P. McShane =

Chief U.S. Marshal (1909–1968)

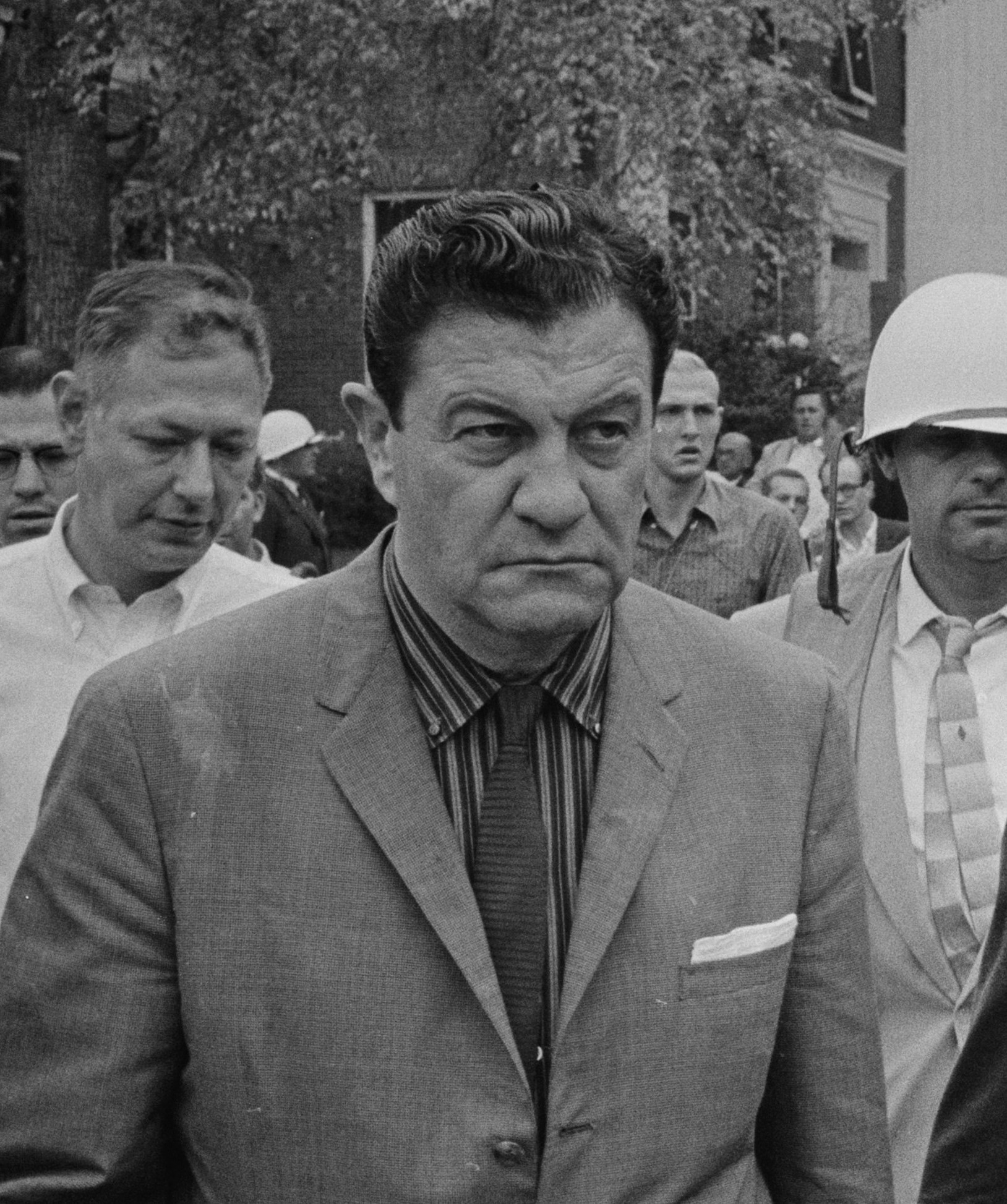
- McShane in 1962

2nd Chief United States Marshal
- In office June 21, 1962 – December 23, 1968
- President: John F. Kennedy; Lyndon B. Johnson
- Preceded by: Clive W. Palmer
- Succeeded by: Carl C. Turner

Personal details
- Born: March 17, 1909 New York City, New York, U.S.
- Died: December 23, 1968 (aged 59) Alexandria, Virginia, U.S.
- Spouse: Teresa Curtis
- Children: 2

James Joseph Patrick McShane (March 17, 1909 – December 23, 1968) was the former Chief United States Marshal during part of the Civil Rights Movement.

== Biography ==
McShane was born in 1909 in New York City.

As head of the Executive Office for U.S. Marshals, he supervised federal agents during the Freedom Rides of 1961, but is most known for his role in leading the federal agents who escorted James Meredith, the first African American student at University of Mississippi in 1962.

In November 1962, McShane was indicted by a Lafayette County Mississippi grand jury on charges that he "did incite a riot" in relation to his decision to fire tear gas into crowds of violent protesters during the Ole Miss riot of 1962. McShane subsequently gave himself up for arrest, was processed, and released. The U.S. District Court found that McShane acted under orders and statutory authority and "had reasonable cause to believe ... that the use of tear gas ... was a proper measure to be taken". The court granted summary judgment in favor of McShane.

Before being a U.S. Marshal, he worked for the Senate's select McClellan Committee, was chief of security and the personal bodyguard for President John F. Kennedy and a New York City Police Department homicide detective.

He died on December 23, 1968, from pneumonia in Alexandria, Virginia.

He had a wife, Teresa Curtis, and two children.
