= In re Neagle =

- Supreme Court of the United States

Argued March 4–5, 1890 Decided April 14, 1890
- Full case name: In re David Neagle
- Citations: 135 U.S. 1 (more) 10 S. Ct. 658; 34 L. Ed. 55; 1890 U.S. LEXIS 2006

Case history
- Prior: Appeal from the Circuit Court of the United States for the Northern District of California

Holding
- Section 3 of Art. II of the U.S. Constitution requires that the Executive Branch "take care that the laws be faithfully executed." The court determined that the appointment of bodyguards to Supreme Court Justices ensured the faithful execution of the law of the United States. The court also relied on a statute granting marshals "the same powers, in executing the laws of the United States, as sheriffs and their deputies in such State may have, by law, in executing the laws thereof."

Court membership
- Chief Justice Melville Fuller Associate Justices Samuel F. Miller · Stephen J. Field; Joseph P. Bradley · John M. Harlan; Horace Gray · Samuel Blatchford; Lucius Q. C. Lamar II · David J. Brewer

Case opinions
- Majority: Miller, joined by Bradley, Harlan, Gray, Blatchford, Brewer
- Dissent: Lamar, joined by Fuller
- Field took no part in the consideration or decision of the case.

Laws applied
- U.S. Const. Art. III, Sec. 788 of the Revised Statutes of the United States

In re Neagle, 135 U.S. 1 (1890), is a United States Supreme Court decision holding that federal officers are immune from State prosecution when acting within the scope of their federal authority.

== Facts ==
Suspecting a plot against US Supreme Court Justice Stephen J. Field's life, in 1889 U.S. Attorney General William Miller instructed US Marshal John Franks to appoint Deputy U.S. Marshal David Neagle (1847–1925) to serve as Justice Field's bodyguard while Field rode circuit in California.

On August 14, 1889, David S. Terry approached Field inside the Lathrop, California train station in California's San Joaquin Valley. Terry, a former California Supreme Court justice, had a long-standing grudge with Field, who had ruled against his wife in a lawsuit and subsequently sentenced both him and his wife to jail on contempt charges. As Terry walked towards the exit to the railroad station dining room, he struck Field from behind with such force that he knocked his glasses off. Terry was known to carry a large Bowie knife, so when he drew back his hand again, fearing Terry was about to kill Field, Neagle shot and killed him. Field and Neagle were arrested by the San Joaquin Sheriff Thomas Cunningham. Cunningham later released Field on his own recognizance, but took Neagle to jail.

The United States Attorney in San Francisco filed a writ of habeas corpus for Neagle's release. The circuit court issued the writ after a hearing and ordered Neagle's release. Sheriff Cunningham, with the aid of the State of California, appealed to the United States Supreme Court.

== Holding ==
The question for the court to decide, was the state obligated to obey the writ even though no national statute empowered the Attorney General to provide judges with bodyguards?

In a 6-2 decision (in which Justice Field abstained), the Supreme Court affirmed the lower court. The decision recognized that, as the source of all executive authority, the President could act in the absence of specific statutory authority since there were no laws that provided for protection of federal judges by the executive branch. Constitutionally, the decision determined that the executive branch exercised its own "necessary and proper" authority.

== See also ==
- List of United States Supreme Court cases, volume 135
