= Justice Prisoner Air Transportation System =

Transport agency of the US Department of Justice

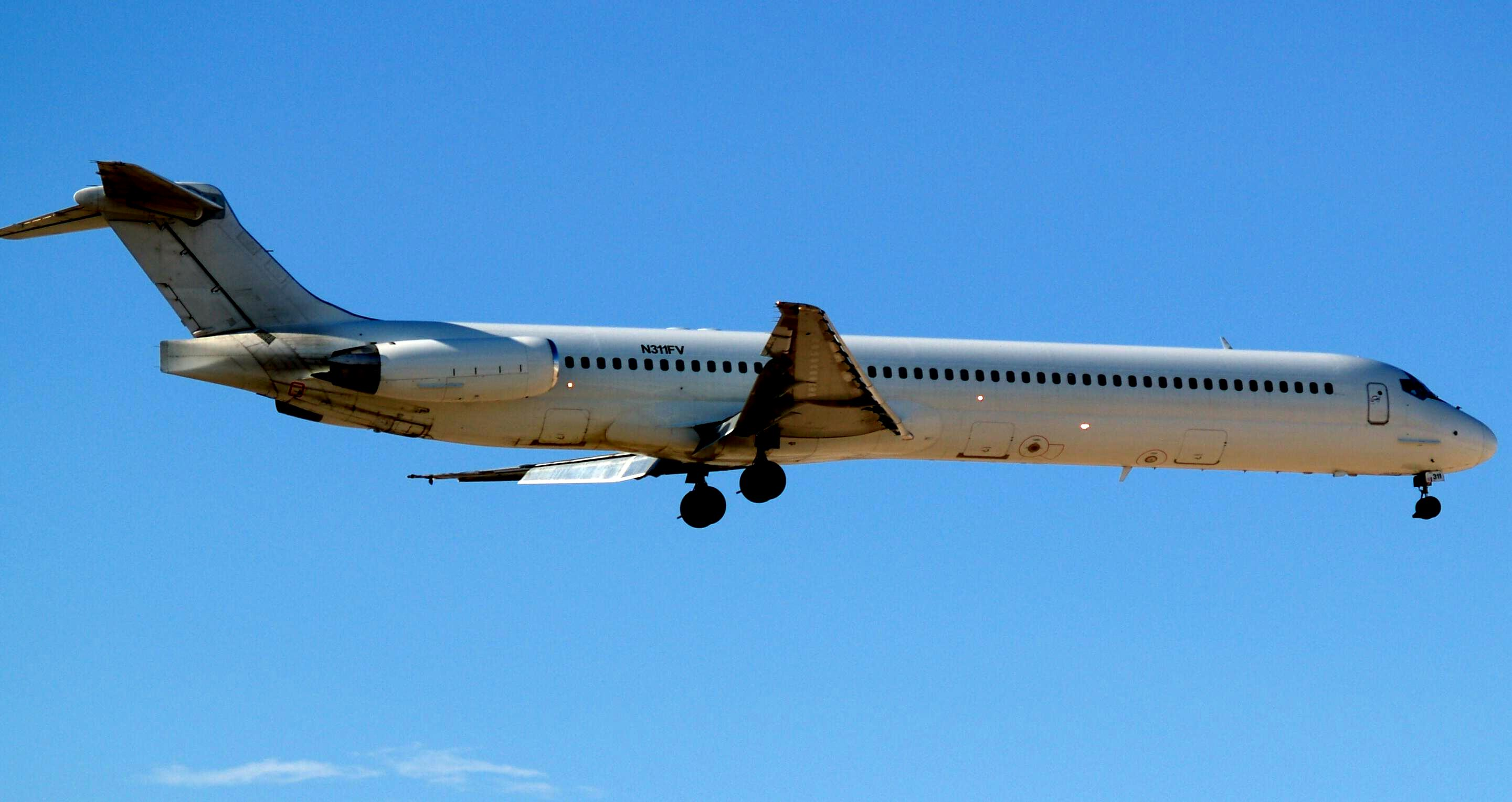
- An unmarked McDonnell Douglas MD-83 flying for JPATS (2008)
| IATA | ICAO | Call sign |
|---|---|---|
| - | DOJ | JUSTICE |
- Founded: 1995
- Hubs: Oklahoma City (Federal Transfer Center)
- Fleet size: 5
- Parent company: United States Marshals Service
- Website: www.usmarshals.gov/what-we-do/prisoners/transportation

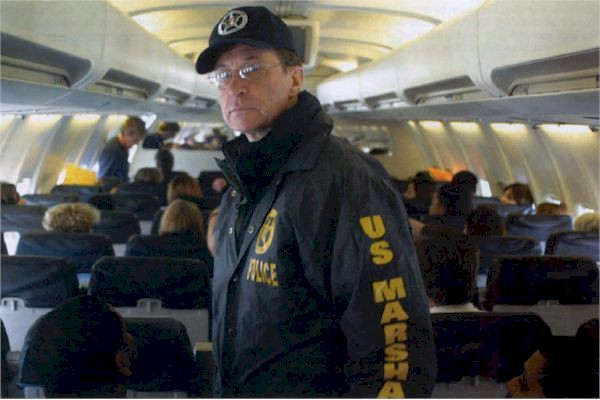
A U.S. Marshal on a "Con Air" flight (c. 2000)

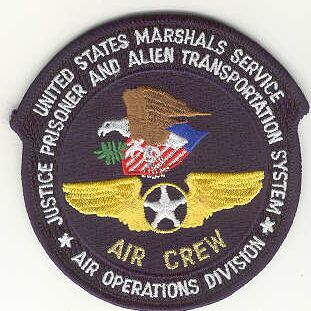
Patch of JPATS, Air Operations Division, Air Crew

The Justice Prisoner Air Transportation System (JPATS; formerly Justice Prisoner and Alien Transportation System before December 2024; nicknamed "Con Air") is a United States Marshals Service (USMS) airline charged with the transportation of persons in legal custody between prisons, detention centers, courthouses, and other locations. It is the largest prison transport network in the world. Though primarily used by the Federal Bureau of Prisons or U.S. Immigration and Customs Enforcement, JPATS also assists military and state law enforcement. Marshals involved in prisoner transportation are referred to as Aviation Enforcement Officers (AEOs).

The agency is managed by the USMS out of the JPATS headquarters in Kansas City, Missouri. JPATS was formed in 1995 from the merger of the Marshals Service air fleet with that of the Immigration and Naturalization Service. JPATS completes more than 260,000 prisoner/alien movements per year. Air fleet operations are located in Oklahoma City, Oklahoma, with hubs in Las Vegas, Nevada; Puerto Rico and the Virgin Islands. Additionally, the Federal Transfer Center at Oklahoma City's Will Rogers International Airport was built especially to facilitate prisoner transport on JPATS.

Usually, the airline employs Boeing 737 aircraft to transport convicts and illegal residents of the United States for extradition and/or deportation. Smaller jets and turboprops may also be used to transport individual prisoners who are considered particularly dangerous or notorious, as well as individuals in the witness protection program.

According to the Marshals Service, JPATS owns and operates four Boeing 737s.

JPATS aircraft use the ICAO designator DOJ with the callsign JUSTICE.

== History and evolution ==
On November 1, 1919, San Francisco Police officer (and future barnstormer) Ivan R. Gates became the first to transport a prisoner by air, one James Kelly (convicted of carrying concealed weapons), from Alameda to San Francisco.

Prior to the existence of JPATS, the air transport of federal inmates over long distances was complicated. The process required an escort by two U.S. Marshals, accompanying the inmate on a regular passenger airplane. This posed numerous problems, including danger to civilians, a backlog of marshals needed to perform such escorts, and a high taxpayer expense.

On August 20, 1985, the U.S. Marshals were offered a transfer from the Federal Aviation Administration (FAA) of a Boeing 727 aircraft. Though no purpose was originally designated for this plane, one official had the idea of using it for the mass transportation of federal inmates. JPATS' predecessor was the National Prisoner Transportation System of the U.S. Marshals Service.

The airline ultimately improved the efficiency of inmate transportation and made the sight of a shackled commercial airline passenger largely a thing of the past. For a plane full of 200 inmates, only 12 marshals are required. Marshals are trained with aircraft emergency procedures very similar to those flight attendants learn to protect the aircraft's occupants, though no data shows the efficiency of this training.

== Today ==
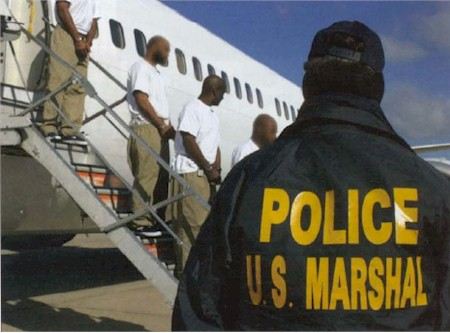
Prisoners deplaning (c. 2000)

Today's JPATS fleet has expanded to four full-sized aircraft. These planes fly a large series of routes that serve nearly every major U.S. city.

The flight schedules are kept secret from the public, and are known only to those directly involved in its operation. Inmates scheduled to fly are given little or no advance notice of their flight, to deter escapes and sabotage, and to prevent harm from outsiders.

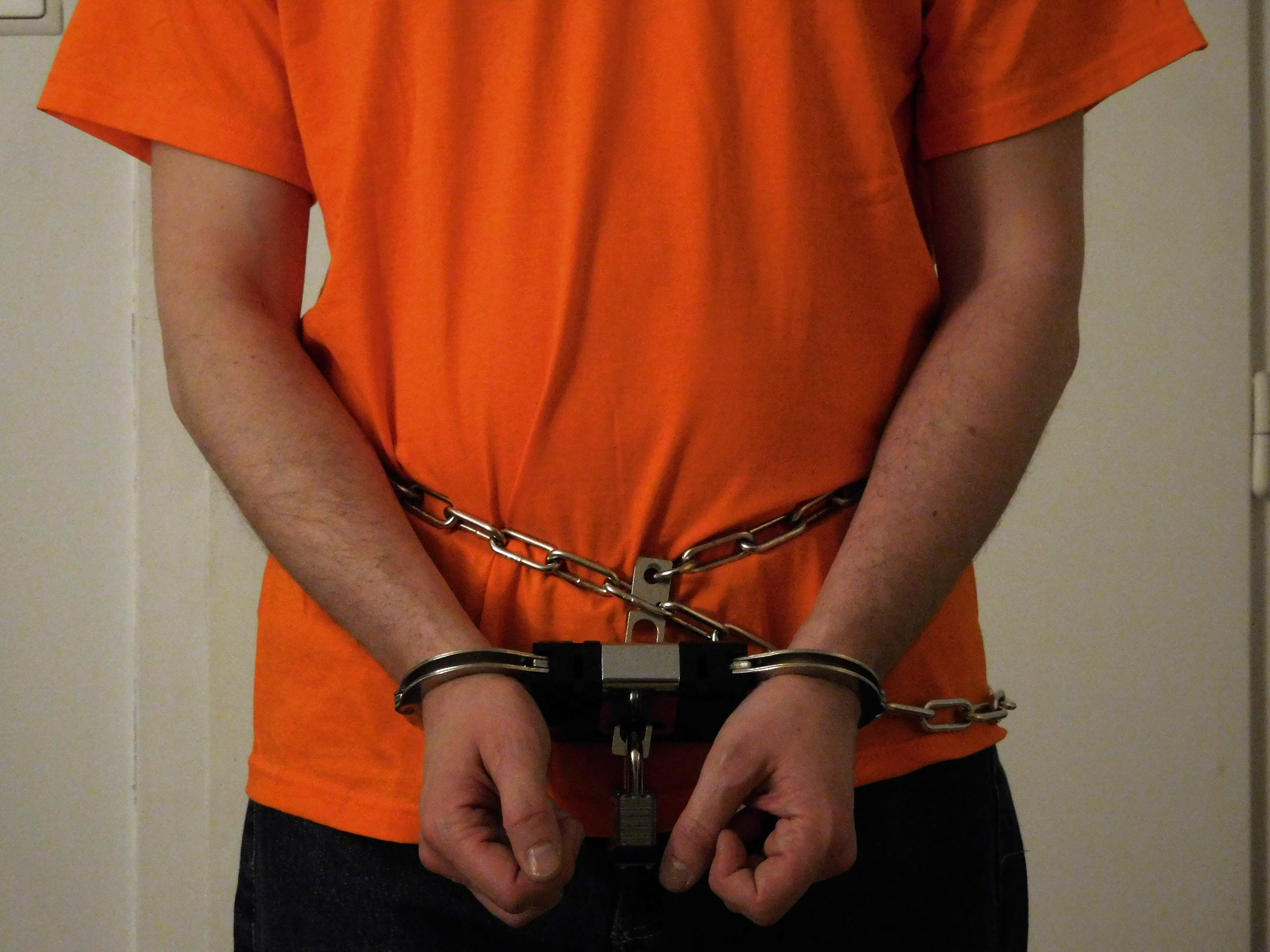
Prisoner in handcuffs augmented with a handcuff cover and belly chains

Passengers aboard a flight are restrained with handcuffs as well as ankle and waist chains which are double- or even triple-locked. Those who pose additional danger may be forced to wear additional restraints, such as reinforced mittens that completely isolate and almost completely immobilize the hands, handcuff covers which conceal the keyholes, and face masks to prevent biting and spitting. However, due to FAA regulations inmates are not physically restrained to their seats in any way except for seat belts used during takeoff and landing.

Flight and seating arrangements are made carefully with the intent to separate inmates who may conflict with one another. For example, members of rival prison gangs may be transported on different days to help reduce the risk of an in-flight incident. Unlike the practice of most jails and prisons, male and female inmates fly together on the same planes.

== Fleet ==
As of August 2025, JPATS operates the following aircraft:

Justice Prisoner and Alien Transportation System fleet
| Aircraft | In service | Orders | Passengers | Notes |
|---|---|---|---|---|
| Boeing 737-400 | 2 | — | 126 | |
| Boeing 737-700 | 1 | — | — | |
| Boeing 737-800 | 2 | — | — | |
| Total | 5 | | | |

=== Fleet development ===
As of August 2023, JPATS was seeking to purchase an additional Boeing 737-700 or Boeing 737-800 to replace one of its current Boeing 737-400 aircraft.

== In popular culture ==
- Con Air (1997), starring Nicolas Cage, was inspired by the operations of the agency, with the title being a reference to its nickname. The film is set on a Fairchild C-123 Provider, an aircraft that JPATS never actually operated, and its interior more closely resembles a prison than actual JPATS aircraft, which do not significantly differ from most airliners. The film's screenplay explains this by saying that the prisoners on the flight are "the worst of the worst", including several serial killers and mass murderers.
- U.S. Marshals (1998) depicted the story of a JPATS Flight 343, a Boeing 727-200 that crashed during flight and the manhunt for a prisoner who escapes following the crash.
- The Last Frontier (2025) a series that depicts a fictional JPATS plane crash and the manhunt for the fugitives who escaped in the aftermath.
- In The Rookie episode "Grand Theft Aircraft" (2026) closely mimics The Last Frontier where the JPATS plane is briefly hijacked by a compromised pilot, whose family was being held hostage. The pilot attempts to land the plane at a separate airfield that is occupied by a private military built by one of the prisoners on the plane. The plane instead crash lands in LA and the prisoners are all freed by the private military and let loose into the city.
