= United States Marshals Service =

Federal law enforcement agency

- Seal of the U.S. Marshals Service

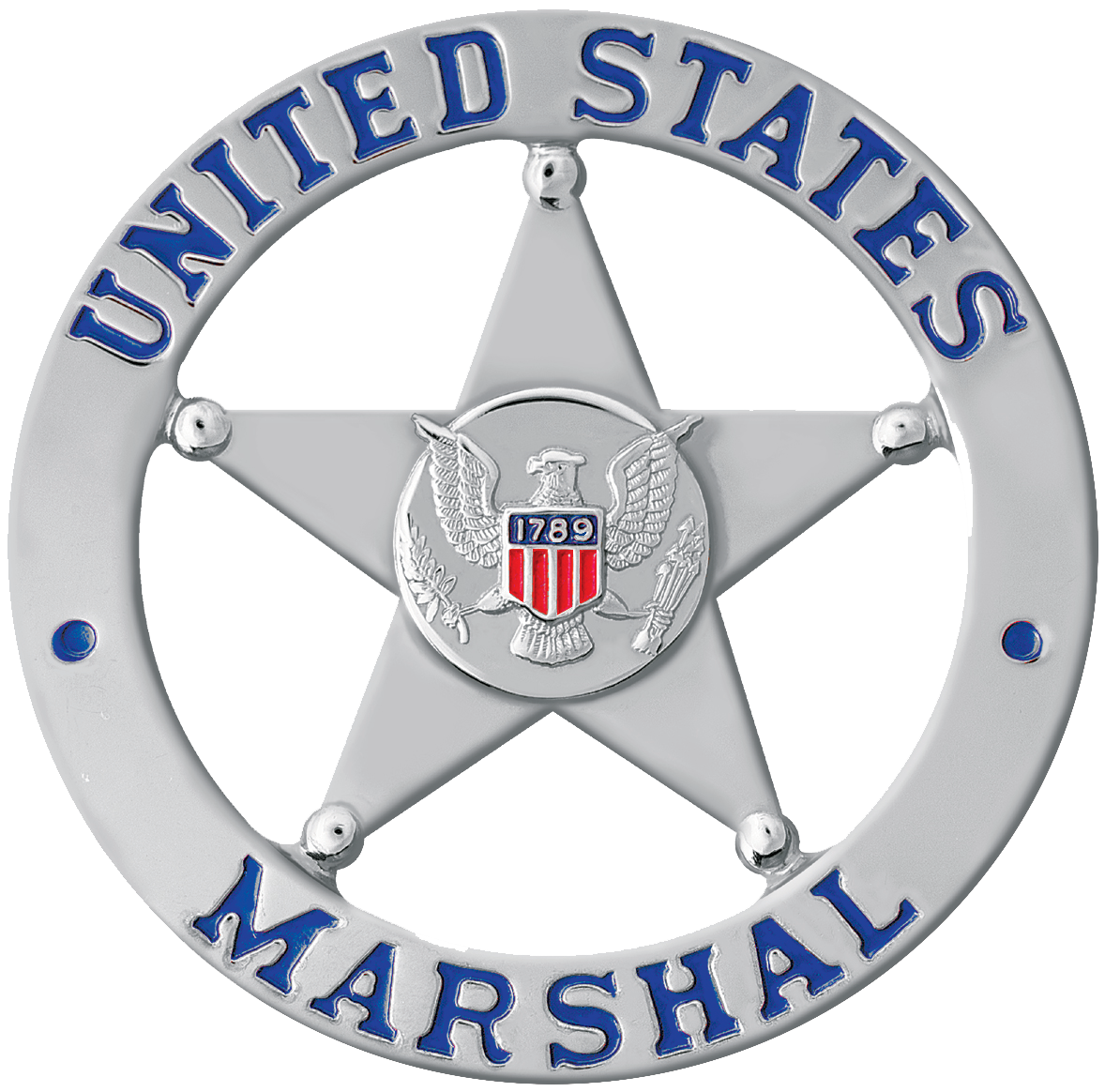
- Badge of a deputy U.S. marshal

- Flag of the U.S. Marshals Service
- Common name: U.S. Marshals
- Abbreviation: USMS
- Motto: Justice, Integrity, Service

Agency overview
- Formed: September 24, 1789; 237 years ago 1969 (in present form)

Jurisdictional structure
- Federal agency: United States
- Operations jurisdiction: United States
- Constituting instrument: United States Code, Title 28, Chapter 37
- General nature: Federal law enforcement

Operational structure
- Headquarters: Crystal City, Arlington County, Virginia, U.S.
- Sworn members: 94 U.S. marshals, one for each federal court district (2025); 3,892 deputy U.S. marshals and criminal investigators (2025)
- Unsworn members: 1,596 administrative employees and detention enforcement officers (2025)
- Agency executives: Gadyaces S. Serralta, Director; Stephanie Creasy, Deputy Director (Acting); Quintella Downs-Bradshaw, Chief of Staff (Acting)
- Parent agency: Department of Justice

Website
- usmarshals.gov

The United States Marshals Service (USMS) is a federal law enforcement agency under the United States Department of Justice. It operates under the direction of the United States attorney general. It is tasked with enforcing the decisions of and providing protection for the United States federal judiciary.

United States Marshals are the original United States federal law enforcement officers, created by the Judiciary Act of 1789 during the presidency of George Washington as the "Office of the United States Marshal" under the United States district court. The USMS was established in 1969 to provide guidance and assistance to U.S. Marshals throughout the federal judicial districts.

The Marshals Service is primarily responsible for locating and arresting federal suspects, the administration of fugitive operations, the management of criminal assets, the operation of the United States Federal Witness Protection Program and the Justice Prisoner Air Transportation System, the protection of federal courthouses and judicial personnel, and the protection of senior government officials through the Office of Protective Operations. Throughout its history the Marshals have also provided unique security and enforcement services including protecting African American students enrolling in the South during the civil rights movement, escort security for United States Air Force LGM-30 Minuteman missile convoys, law enforcement for the United States Antarctic Program, and protection of the Strategic National Stockpile.

== History ==
=== Origins ===
The office of United States Marshal was created by the First Congress. President George Washington signed the Judiciary Act into law on September 24, 1789. The act provided that a United States Marshal's primary function was to execute all lawful warrants issued to him under the authority of the United States. The law defined marshals as officers of the courts charged with assisting federal courts in their law-enforcement functions:

And be it further enacted, That a marshal shall be appointed in and for each district for a term of four years, but shall be removable from office at pleasure, whose duty it shall be to attend the district and circuit courts when sitting therein, and also the Supreme Court in the district in which that court shall sit. And to execute throughout the district, all lawful precepts directed to him, and issued under the authority of the United States, and he shall have the power to command all necessary assistance in the execution of his duty, and to appoint as shall be occasion, one or more deputies.

Six days after signing the act into law, President Washington appointed the first thirteen U.S. Marshals, for each of the then extant federal districts. To each of his appointees for Marshal and District Attorney, the president addressed a form letter:

I have the pleasure to inform you that you are appointed (Marshal or Attorney) for the District of _______ and your Commission is enclosed, accompanied with such Laws as have passed relative to the Judicial Department of the United States. The high importance of the Judicial System in our National Government made it an indispensable duty to select such Characters to fill the several offices in it as would discharge their respective trust with honor to themselves and advantage to their Country.

The critical Supreme Court decision affirming the legal authority of the federal marshals was made in In re Neagle, 135 U.S. 1 (1890).

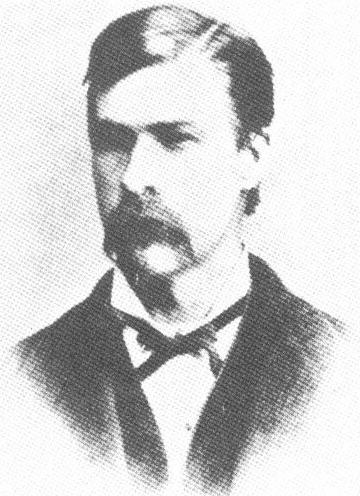
Deputy U.S. Marshal Morgan Earp in an 1881 photograph

For over 100 years marshals were patronage jobs, typically controlled by the district judge. They were paid primarily by fees until a salary system was set up in 1896. Many of the first U.S. Marshals had already proven themselves in military service during the American Revolutionary War. Among the first marshals were John Adams's son-in-law Congressman William Stephens Smith for the District of New York, another New York district marshal, Congressman Thomas Morris, and Henry Dearborn for the District of Maine.

From the nation's earliest days, marshals were permitted to recruit special deputies as local hires, or as temporary transfers to the Marshals Service from other federal law-enforcement agencies. Marshals were also authorized to swear in a posse to assist with manhunts, and other duties, ad hoc. Marshals were given extensive authority to support the federal courts within their judicial districts, and to carry out all lawful orders issued by federal judges, Congress, or the president. Federal marshals were by far the most important government officials in territorial jurisdictions. Local law enforcement officials were often called "marshals" so there is often an ambiguity whether someone was a federal or a local official.

Federal marshals are most famous for their law enforcement work, but that was only a minor part of their workload. The largest part of the business was paper work—serving writs (e.g., subpoenas, summonses, warrants), and other processes issued by the courts, making arrests and handling all federal prisoners. They also disbursed funds as ordered by the courts. Marshals paid the fees and expenses of the court clerks, U.S. Attorneys, jurors, and witnesses. They rented the courtrooms and jail space, and hired the bailiffs, criers, and janitors. They made sure the prisoners were present, the jurors were available, and that the witnesses were on time. The marshals thus provided local representation for the federal government within their districts. They took the national census every decade through 1870. They distributed presidential proclamations, collected a variety of statistical information on commerce and manufacturing, supplied the names of government employees for the national register, and performed other routine tasks needed for the central government to function effectively.

=== 19th century ===
During the War of 1812, marshals such as Peter Le Barbier Duplessis played a significant role in communicating intelligence and in defense of key sites such as New Orleans. During the settlement of the American frontier, marshals served as the main source of day-to-day law enforcement in areas that had no local government of their own. U.S. Marshals were instrumental in keeping law and order in the "Old West" era. They were involved in apprehending desperadoes such as Bill Doolin, Ned Christie, and in 1893, the infamous Dalton Gang after a shoot-out that left dead Deputy Marshals Ham Hueston and Lafe Shadley, and posse member Dick Speed. Individual deputy marshals have been seen as legendary heroes in the face of rampant lawlessness (see Notable marshals below) with Wyatt Earp, Bat Masterson, Dallas Stoudenmire, and Bass Reeves as examples of well-known marshals. Bill Tilghman, Heck Thomas, and Chris Madsen formed a legendary law enforcement trio known as "Three Guardsmen" when they worked together policing the vast, lawless Oklahoma and Indian Territories.

Until its repeal in 1864, the Fugitive Slave Act of 1850 tasked marshals to accept an affidavit on its face to recover a fugitive slave.

On October 26, 1881, Deputy U.S. Marshal and Tombstone City Marshal Virgil Earp, his brothers, Deputy City Marshal Morgan and temporary Assistant City Marshal Wyatt, and temporary Assistant City Marshal John "Doc" H. Holliday (the latter two only sworn in by Virgil moments before), gunned down Frank and Tom McLaury and Billy Clanton in the legendary gunfight at the O.K. Corral in Tombstone, Arizona. In 1894, U.S. Marshals helped suppress the Pullman Strike.

==== Marshals of the Consular Court ====
During the 19th century, the United States government appointed marshals to be attached to the courts of American consulates in China, the Ottoman Empire, and Siam. The duties of these marshals included settling shipboard disputes and mutinies aboard American vessels, the apprehension of runaway sailors and American crews engaged in the illegal slave trade, adjusting claims for damages caused by American sailors to natives, and the rescue of natives kidnapped for slavery by Americans.

=== 20th century ===
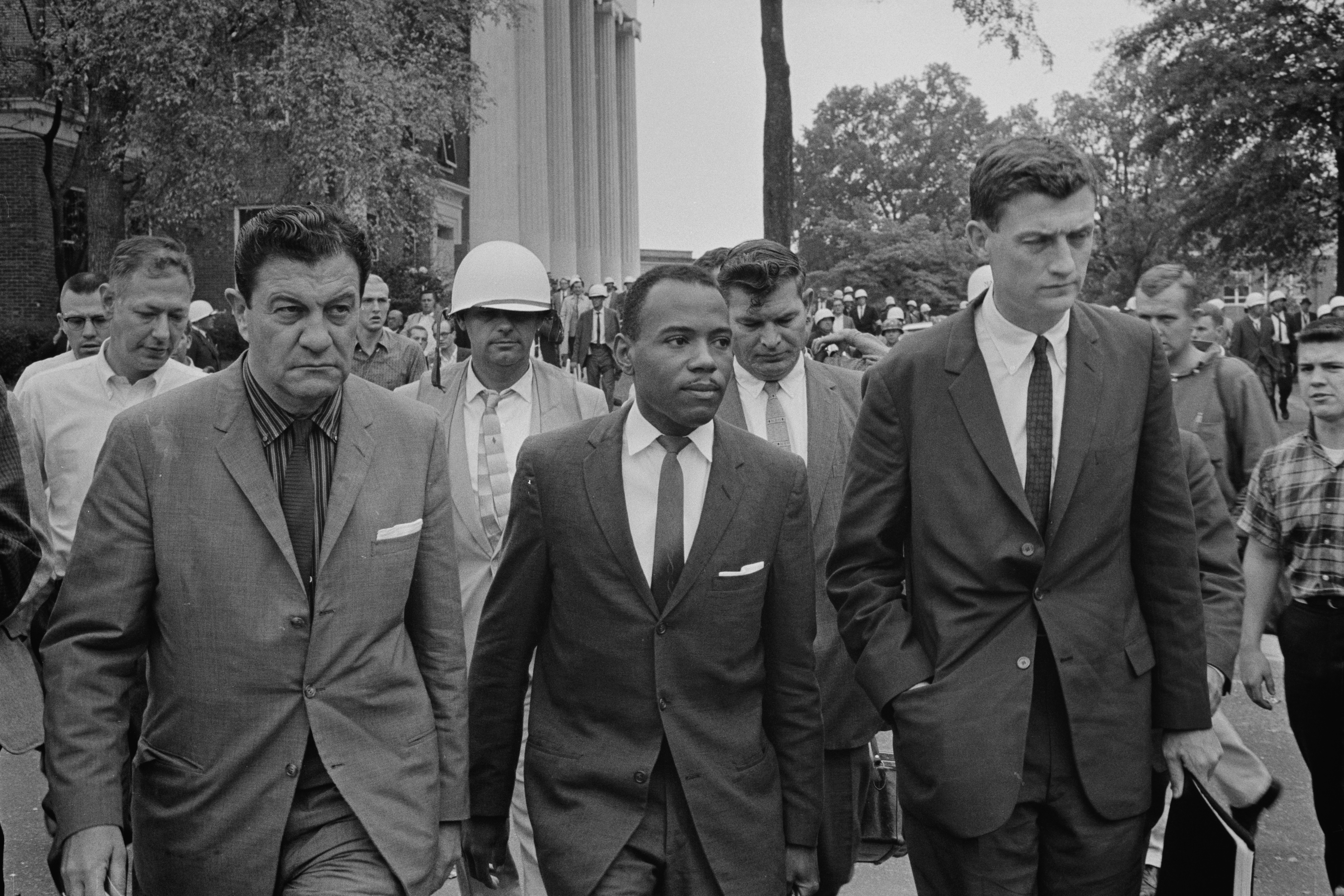
U.S. Marshals accompanying James Meredith to class

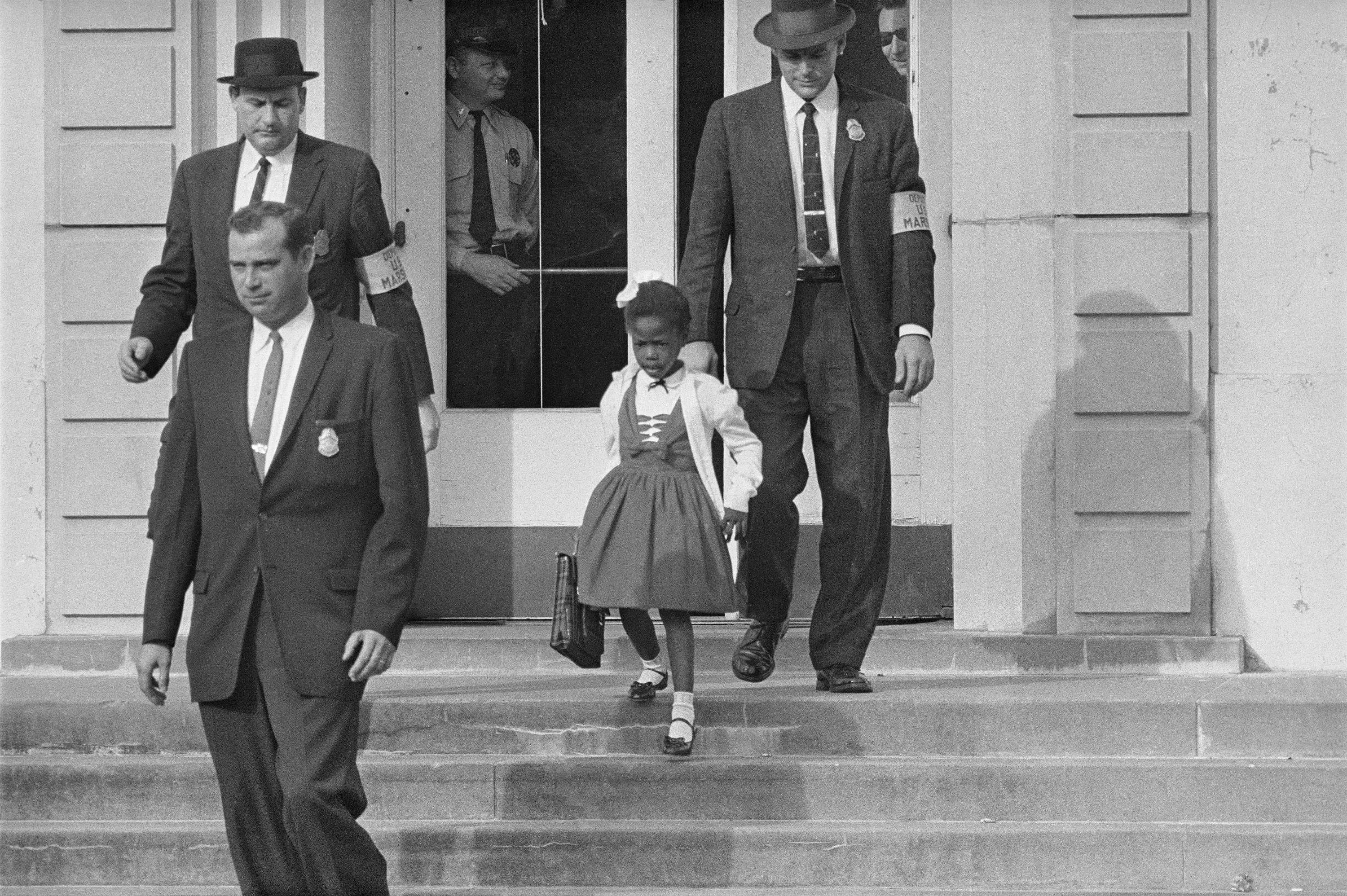
Marshals escort six-year-old Ruby Bridges from school.

During the 1920s, U.S. Marshals enforced Prohibition. Marshals registered enemy aliens in wartime, sealed the American border against armed expeditions from foreign countries, and at times during the Cold War also swapped spies with the Soviet Union.

In the 1960s the marshals were on the front lines of the civil rights movement, mainly providing protection to volunteers. In September 1962, President John F. Kennedy ordered 127 marshals to accompany James Meredith, an African American who wished to register at the segregated University of Mississippi. Their presence on campus provoked riots at the university, but the marshals stood their ground, and Meredith registered. Marshals provided continuous protection to Meredith during his first year at Ole Miss, and Attorney General Robert F. Kennedy later proudly displayed a deputy marshal's dented helmet in his office. U.S. Marshals also protected black school children integrating public schools in the South. Artist Norman Rockwell's famous painting The Problem We All Live With depicted a tiny Ruby Bridges being escorted by four towering United States Marshals in 1964.

In 1956, the Executive Office for U.S. Marshals was created as "the first organization to supervise U.S. Marshals nationwide". Until 1966, each U.S. district court hired and administered its own marshals independently from all others. The United States Marshals Service was created in 1969. Since June 1975, the Marshals Service has the mission of providing law enforcement support and escort security to United States Air Force LGM-30 Minuteman and missile systems from military facilities.

In 1985, the Marshals Service partnered with local Washington, D.C., law enforcement officers to create Operation Flagship, arresting fugitives by using faked free tickets to a local American football game as a lure. In 1989, the Marshals Service was given jurisdiction over crimes committed relating to U.S. personnel in Antarctica. During the 1992 Los Angeles riots, 200 deputy marshals of the tactical unit Special Operations Group were dispatched to assist local and state authorities in restoring peace and order throughout Los Angeles County, California. In the 1990s, deputy marshals protected abortion clinics.

=== 21st century ===
Marshals have protected American athletes at Olympic Games, the refugee boy Elián González before his return to Cuba in 2000, and abortion clinics as required by federal law. In 2003, Marshals retrieved North Carolina's copy of the Bill of Rights.

In 2002, the Marshals Service was tasked by the Centers for Disease Control and Prevention (CDC) to provide protective security and law enforcement capabilities in the protection of the Strategic National Stockpile (SNS), such as warehouses, materiel and CDC personnel during deployment. Marshals also provide secure transportation of critical medical supplies and bio-terrorism response resources throughout the nation. Senior Inspectors of the U.S. Marshals Service SNS Security Operations (SNSSO) Program have deployed to Hurricane Katrina in 2005 and responded during the H1N1 flu pandemic in 2009. SNSSO Senior Inspectors have also staffed National Security Special Events (NSSE) with their state, local and other federal partners on a regular basis.

In 2006, the Sex Offenders Investigations Branch (SOIB) was formed on July 27 with the passage of the Adam Walsh Child Protection and Safety Act (AWA). The SOIB carries out the USMS's three principal responsibilities under the AWA: assist state, local, tribal, and territorial authorities in the location and apprehension of non-compliant and fugitive sex offenders; investigate violations of the act for federal prosecution, and assist in the identification and location of sex offenders relocated as a result of a major disaster. To ensure the safety of communities and children across the country, the USMS has implemented an aggressive enforcement strategy for its responsibilities under the AWA. This branch apprehends sex offenders, primarily those who prey on minors. Offenders are apprehended due to failure to register, among other things.

In February 2017, Marshals began providing protective security to United States secretary of education Betsy DeVos, the first time since 2009 that a United States Cabinet-level official has been provided security by the Marshals. Marshals were deployed to keep order in Washington, D.C. during the George Floyd protests on May 31, 2020, as well as during the January 6 United States Capitol attack. Since January 8, 2021 the Office of Protective Operations no longer provides protective services to the United States secretary of education as Betsy DeVos resigned and it was considered that her successor Miguel Cardona did not need the security based on the fact that there was an absence of a credible threat against his life or that of his family.

On April 29, 2024, in Charlotte, North Carolina, one Marshal, two Department of Adult Corrections officers, and one local police officer on a task force were killed serving a warrant on a man for possession of a firearm by a convicted felon. Four Charlotte-Mecklenburg Police Department officers were wounded.

== Duties and responsibilities ==
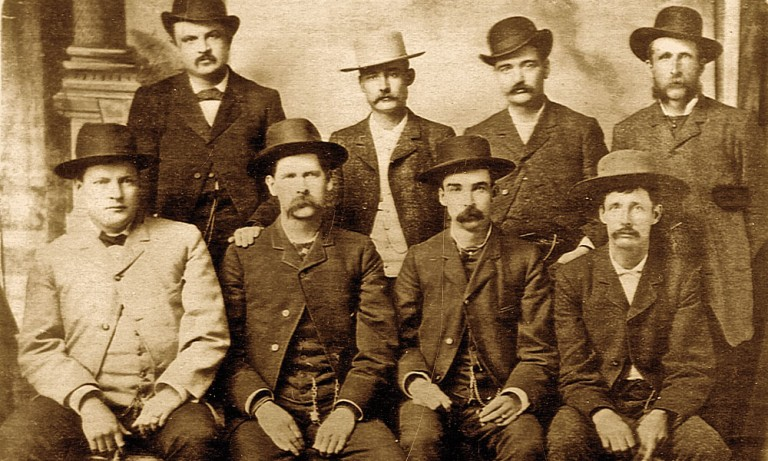
Bat Masterson (standing second from right), Wyatt Earp (sitting second from left), and other deputy marshals during the Wild West era

The Marshals Service is responsible for apprehending wanted fugitives, providing protection for the federal judiciary, transporting federal prisoners, protecting endangered federal witnesses, and managing assets seized from criminal enterprises. The Marshals Service is responsible for 55.2% of arrests of federal fugitives. Between 1981 and 1985, the Marshals Service conducted Fugitive Investigative Strike Team operations to jump-start fugitive capture in specific districts. In 2012, U.S. marshals captured over 36,000 federal fugitives and cleared over 39,000 fugitive warrants.

The Marshals Service also executes all lawful writs, processes, and orders issued under the authority of the United States, and can command all necessary assistance to execute its duties, as found in 18 USC 564. Other powers are also listed in: 18USC3053; 28USC566; 50USC24; 18USC3058 and 18USC3193.

Historically, under Section 27 of the Judiciary Act of 1789 U.S. Marshals had the common law-based power to enlist any willing civilians as deputies for necessary assistance in the execution of their duties. In the Old West this was known as forming a posse, although under the Posse Comitatus Act, they could not use military troops in uniform representing their unit or the military service for law enforcement duties. However, if a service member was off duty, wearing civilian clothing, and willing to assist a law enforcement officer on their own behalf, it was acceptable. In contemporary times, the deputation of a civilian would be extraordinarily unusual. However, the director of the United States Marshals Service currently has the statutory authority to deputize (for one year) selected officers of the United States Department of Justice; federal, state, or local law enforcement officers; employees of private security companies to provide courtroom security for the Federal judiciary; or other persons as designated by the United States associate attorney general.

Title 28 USC Chapter 37 § 564 authorizes United States Marshals, deputy marshals and such other officials of the Service as may be designated by the Director, in executing the laws of the United States within a State, to exercise the same powers which a sheriff of the State may exercise in executing the laws thereof. Title 28 US Code 566 and 18 USC 3053 authorizes the carry of firearms and powers of arrest (with and without warrants) for violations of law.

Except for suits by incarcerated persons, non-prisoner litigants proceeding in forma pauperis, or (in some circumstances) by seamen, U.S. Marshals no longer serve leading process or subpoenas in private civil actions filed in the U.S. district courts. Under the Federal Rules of Civil Procedure, process may be served by any U.S. citizen over the age of 18 who is not a party involved in the case. The Marshals still levy executions and serve writs of garnishment.

=== Witness Protection Program ===
A chief responsibility of the Marshals is the United States Federal Witness Protection Program.

=== Justice Prisoner Air Transportation System (JPATS) ===
The Marshals Service operates the Justice Prisoner Air Transportation System (JPATS), an airline used mainly to transport inmates between prisons and courts across the United States; multiple Marshals guard the prisoners on every flight. The service is also used to carry out ordered deportations of undocumented immigrants.

=== Justice for Victims of Trafficking Act of 2015 ===
The Justice for Victims of Trafficking Act of 2015 amends the federal judicial code to authorize the United States Marshals Service to assist state, local, tribal, and other federal law enforcement agencies, upon request, in locating and recovering missing children. The Justice for Victims of Trafficking Act also established The Missing Child Unit of The Marshals Service.

=== Fugitive programs ===
The Marshals Service publicizes the names of wanted persons it places on the list of U.S. Marshals 15 Most Wanted Fugitives, which is similar to and sometimes overlaps the FBI Ten Most Wanted Fugitives list or the Bureau of Alcohol, Tobacco, Firearms, and Explosives Most Wanted List, depending on jurisdiction.

The 15 Most Wanted Fugitive Program was established in 1983 in an effort to prioritize the investigation and apprehension of high-profile offenders who are considered to be some of the country's most dangerous fugitives. These offenders tend to be career criminals with histories of violence or whose instant offense(s) pose a significant threat to public safety. Current and past fugitives in this program include murderers, sex offenders, major drug kingpins, organized crime figures, and individuals wanted for high-profile financial crimes.

The Major Case Fugitive Program was established in 1985 in an effort to supplement the successful 15 Most Wanted Fugitive Program. Much like the 15 Most Wanted Fugitive Program, the Major Case Fugitive Program prioritizes the investigation and apprehension of high-profile offenders who are considered to be some of the country's most dangerous individuals. All escapes from custody are automatically elevated to Major Case status.

The Wall Street Journal reported on November 14, 2014, that the Marshals Service's Technical Operations Group utilizes a so-called dirtbox to track fugitives.

=== Special Operations Group ===
The Director of the United States Marshal Service, Wayne Colburn, formed the Special Operations Group (SOG) in 1971 as a response to the unstable socio-political environment of the late 1960s and early 1970s. Marshals found themselves at large and violent anti-government protests and securing federal facilities against threats. Due to the rising threats and increased hostility, the United States Marshals Service formed SOG. SOG is the Marshals Service’s rapid deployable tactical unit that supports the missions of the Marshal Service and Department of Justice. It is a tactical team that is capable of conducting high risk and complex operations to enforce and protect the law and the federal judicial system both within the United States and the globe. SOG is also capable of performing high risk operations that include high-risk entry, explosive breaching, observing, rural operations, evasive driving, waterborne operation, and tactical medical support. They receive further training from joint trainings with units like 10th Special Forces Group

Deputy U.S. Marshals seeking to join SOG must fit the age requirements between 21 and 36, possess a bachelor’s degree or equivalent, and pass an extensive background check that grants them a Top Secret security clearance. Candidates must volunteer and complete a multi-month selection course and new operator course that challenges deputies mentally and physically. If selected, they become full-time deputies in SOG.

Deputies in SOG are trained to conduct protective security services for federal workers, witnesses, and their families. They are also tasked in apprehending fugitives at large, and transporting prisoners between federal institutions. SOG conducts specialized tasks such as sniper and counter sniper operations, motorcade security, and provides less than lethal methods during protests and riots that occur near federal court buildings and civil disturbances.

SOG is based out of their tactical center and reports to the Deputy Director to the Director of the United States Marshal service. It is deployed throughout USMS districts across the United States, and through fiscal years 2015 through 2019, 27% of deployments were for tactical support for federal judicial districts, including protective services and executing warrants and raids. Eighteen percent of their deployments were transporting prisoners for high-profile trials, 14 percent of SOG’s deployments were for manhunts and fugitive operations. Thirteen percent were for special events such as recruitment and other miscellaneous events. Fourteen percent of SOG’s deployments were performing security checks at operation areas, and the remaining 13 percent included disaster response, extradition, and motorcades.

The SOG also maintains a small, full-time operational cadre stationed at the Marshals Service Tactical Operations Center at Louisiana National Guard Training Center Pineville, Louisiana, where all deputies undergo extensive, specialized training in tactics and weaponry, and William F. Degan Tactical Operations Center at Camp Beauregard Alexandria, Louisiana.

=== Office of Protective Operations ===
The Office of Protective Operations (OPO) is the United States Marshals Service's specialist unit for physical protection. OPO provides subject matter expertise, guidance, and direct action support to district offices on high-profile proceedings and threat-based protective operations. The footprint is national, covering all twelve federal judicial circuits across the country, with the ability to project globally.

Currently, the OPO is responsible for two permanent risk-based protection details for the deputy attorney general Todd Blanche and the secretary of health and human services Robert F. Kennedy Jr. During the first Trump administration it provided security to then secretary of education Betsy DeVos, due to threats against her life, from 2017 until her resignation on January 8, 2021.

These senior inspectors routinely deploy across the U.S. and around the globe to protect the deputy attorney general and secretary of health and human services. They lead security for nominees to the U.S. Supreme Court through the pendency of the nomination, which are often fraught with threats of violence and protests. They also provide security for sitting U.S. Supreme Court justices when those justices are farther than fifty miles from Washington, D.C., where the U.S. Supreme Court Police have statutory protection authority. As a result, they develop a deep expertise in protective operations and partner extensively with the U.S. Secret Service and the Diplomatic Security Service, along with local, state, federal, and foreign law enforcement and security agencies.

In 2019, the Trump administration investigated the feasibility of shifting protective responsibility for many government officials to the U.S. Marshals.

== Training and equipment ==
=== Training ===
Marshals Service hiring is competitive and comparable to the selection process for special agent positions in agencies with similar duties. Typically fewer than five percent of qualified applicants are hired and must possess at a minimum a four-year bachelor's degree or competitive work experience (which is usually three or more years at a local or state police department). While the USMS's hiring process is not entirely public, applicants must pass a written test, an oral board interview, an extensive background investigation, a medical examination and drug test, and multiple Fitness In Total (FIT) exams to be selected for training. Deputy U.S. Marshals complete a 18-week training program at the U.S. Department of Homeland Security's Federal Law Enforcement Training Center in Glynco, Georgia.

=== Firearms and protective gear ===
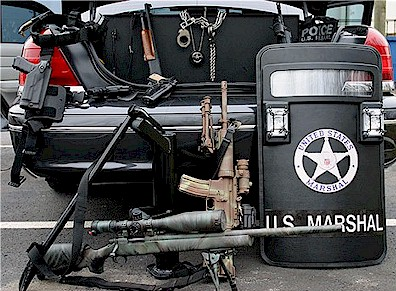
Equipment used by the USMS

The primary handgun for all current deputy marshals is the Glock 17 chambered in 9mm. Prior to that deputies were issued the Glock 22 chambered in .40 S&W. Deputy Marshals may also carry a backup gun, but it must meet certain requirements. Deputy Marshals are also equipped with body armor and collapsible batons for daily use, and ballistic shields, helmets, and protective goggles for serving high risk warrants.

Members of the U.S. Marshal SOG Teams are armed with the Staccato Model P 2011 pistols in 9mm. They have both a full size with a red dot sight as well as a smaller, more concealable version for covert operations. In 2019, the SOG adopted the STI 2011, a 1911 platform of pistol that is modified for USMS SOG needs.

All marshals have a variety of AR-platform rifles, shotguns, and less-lethal options available for their use. Recently, the service has introduced a body-worn camera (BWC) program. Marshals are issued various body armor including a concealable vest, a tactical vest that accepts their soft-armor panels and rifle plates, as well as a rifle plate only carrier depending on their needs. Ballistic helmets and shields are also available.

=== Surveillance airplanes ===
The U.S. Marshals Service has planes registered under a front company named Early Detection Alarm Systems, which has an address of a UPS Store mailbox in Spring, Texas. This operation has been in place since at least 2007, and by 2014 were based in five airports across the country.

The planes tend to fly in a tight circle; GPS/radio trackers, cameras, video recorder, and video transmitter installations are documented. It is also presumed to include an IMSI-catcher such as the Stingray phone tracker or the Boeing DRTbox (Dirtbox), which are used by the Marshals' Technical Operations Group.

Observed locations of U.S. Marshals planes

- Mexico states of Sinaloa and Durango during April–May, July, and November 2017, including during the capture of a Sinaloa Cartel member in El Dorado, Sinaloa on May 1, 2017
- Guatemala
- Carver Shores, Orlando, Florida, January 2017

== Organization ==
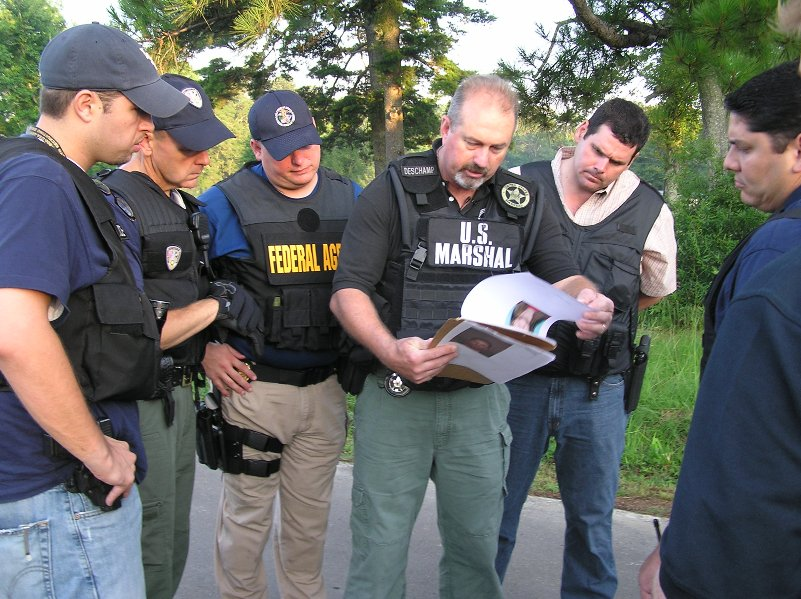
Marshals being briefed for Operation FALCON III, 2008

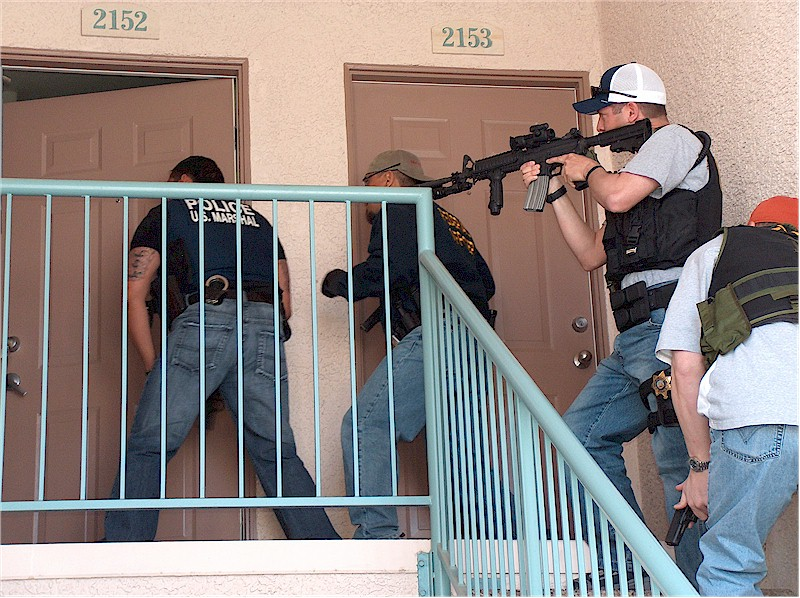
Deputy U.S. Marshals and Las Vegas Metropolitan Police Department officers during a "knock-and-announce" procedure

The Marshals Service is based in Arlington County, Virginia, and, under the authority of the attorney general, is headed by a director, who is assisted by a deputy director. The director is supervised by the deputy attorney general. The Marshals Service headquarters provides command, control, and cooperation for the disparate elements of the service.

=== Headquarters ===
- Director of the U.S. Marshals Service
  - Chief of Staff
    - Office of General Counsel
    - Office of Equal Employment Opportunity
  - Deputy Director of the U.S. Marshals Service
    - Chief of District Affairs
    - Office of Professional Responsibility
  - Associate Director for Operations
    - Judicial Security Division
      - Office of Protective Operations
        - Deputy Attorney General's Protection Detail
        - Secretary of Education's Protection Detail
    - Investigative Operations Division
    - Witness Security Division
    - Tactical Operations Division
    - Prisoner Operations Division
    - Justice Prisoner Air Transportation System
  - Chief Financial Officer
    - Financial Services Division
  - Associate Director for Administration
    - Training Division
    - Human Resources Division
    - Information Technology Division
    - Office of Public and Congressional Affairs
    - Management Support Division
    - Asset Forfeiture Division

=== Federal judicial districts ===
The U.S. court system is divided into 94 federal judicial districts, each with a district court (except the territory of Guam and the Commonwealth of the Northern Mariana Islands, which share a U.S. Marshal). For each district there is a presidentially-appointed and Senate-confirmed United States Marshal, a chief deputy U.S. Marshal (GS-14 or 15) (and an assistant chief Deputy U.S. Marshal in certain larger districts), Supervisory deputy U.S. Marshals (GS-13), and as many deputy U.S. Marshals (GS-7 and above) and special deputy U.S. Marshals as needed. In the United States federal budget for 2005, funds for 3,067 deputy marshals and criminal investigators were provided. The U.S. Marshal for each United States courts of appeals (the 13 circuit courts) is the U.S. Marshal in whose district that court is physically located.

The director and each United States Marshal are appointed by the president of the United States and subject to confirmation by the U.S. Senate. The district U.S. Marshal is traditionally appointed from a list of qualified law enforcement personnel for that district or state. Each state has at least one district, while several larger states have three or more.

== Personnel ==
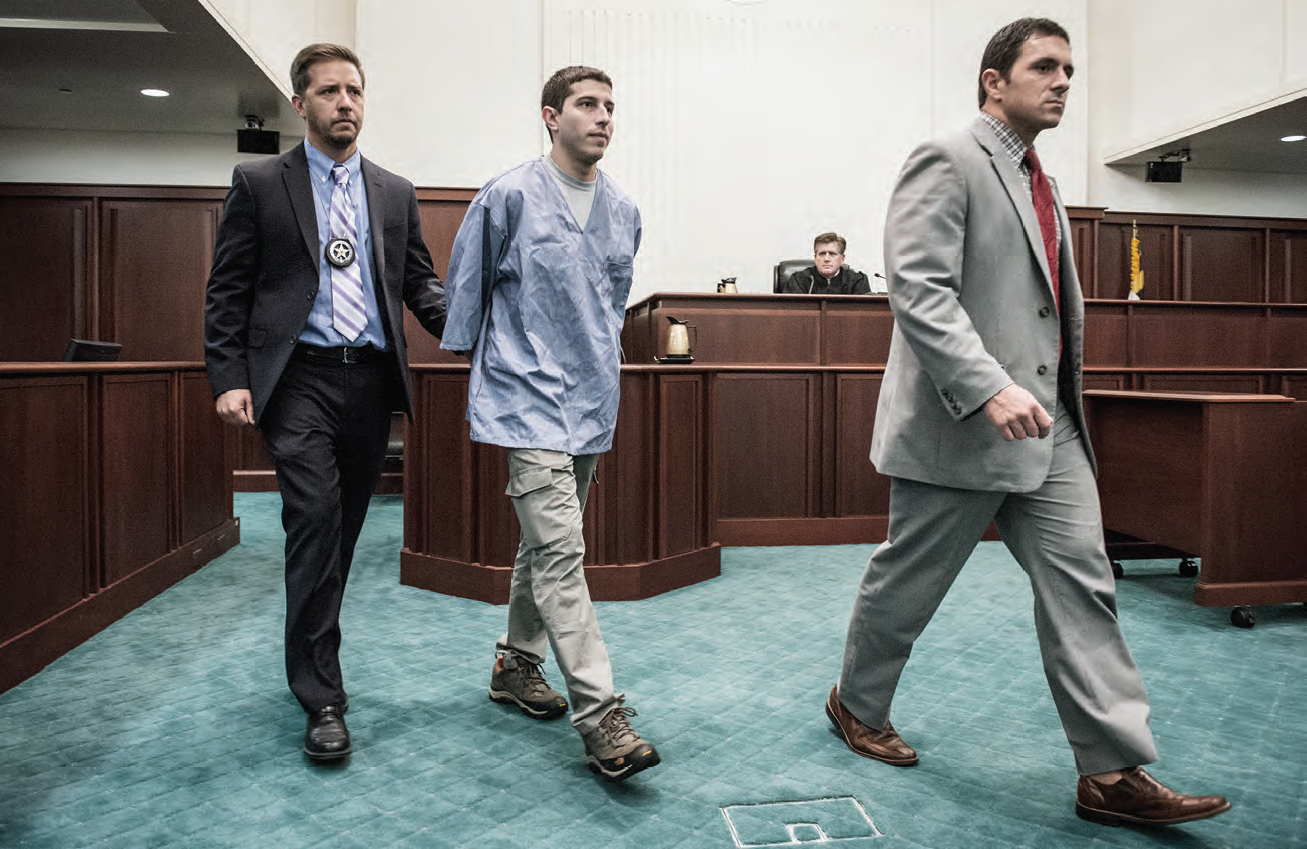
United States Marshals escorting a prisoner in court

Marshals arresting a suspect

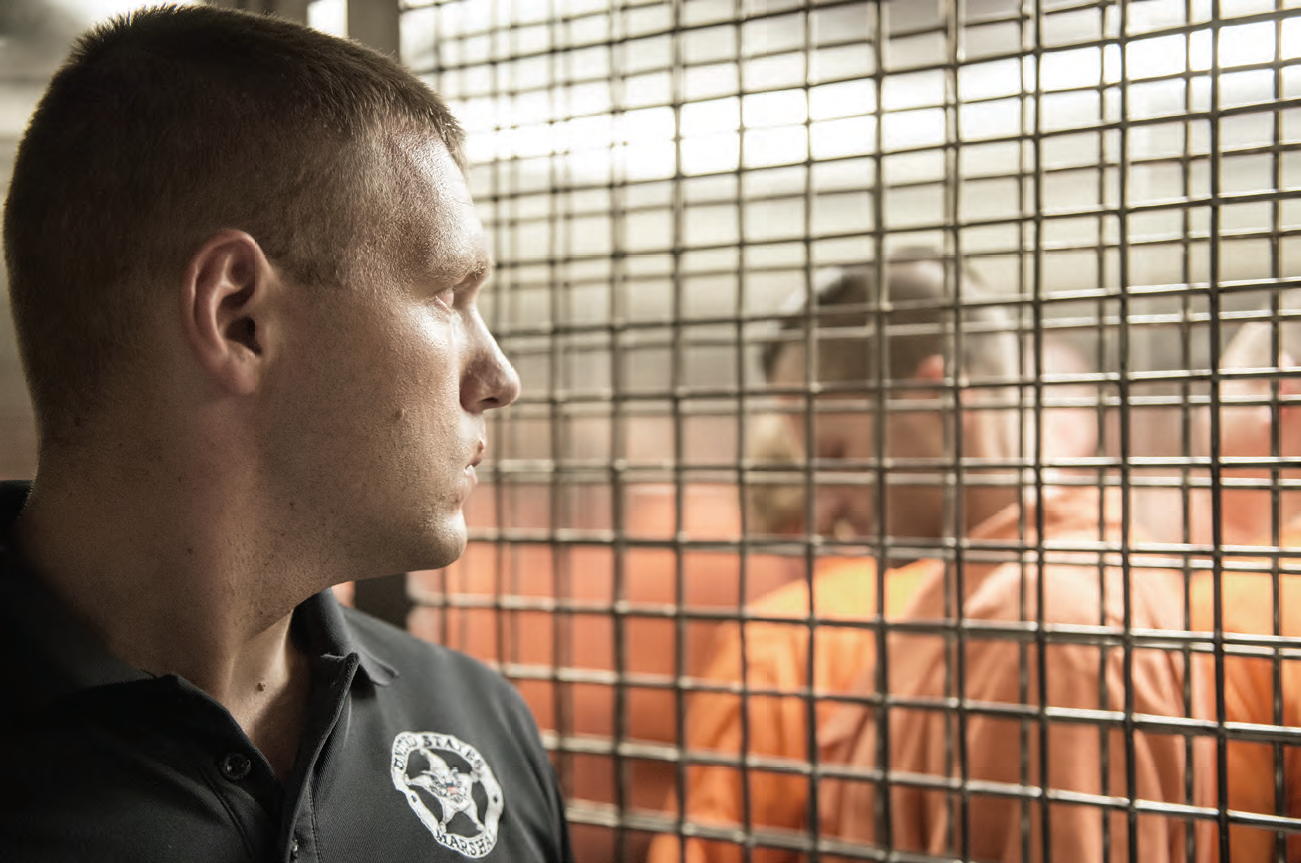
Deputy United States Marshal guarding prisoners

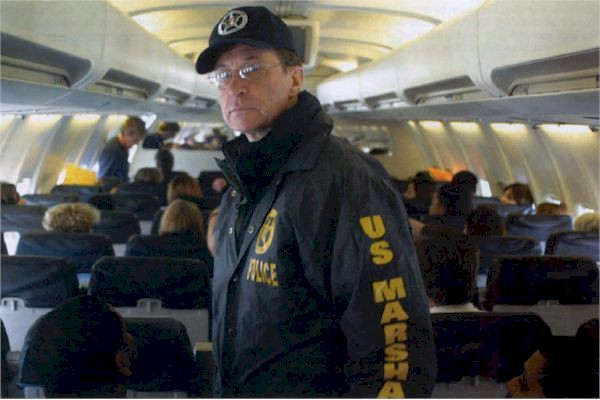
A U.S. Marshal on a "Con Air" flight

=== Titles ===
Agency executives

- The director, originally titled the chief United States Marshal, overall head of the USMS and overseer of the Marshals.
- The deputy director, principal deputy and first in line of succession to the director.

Marshals

- United States Marshal: the top executive of the Marshals Service in each of the 94 federal judicial districts, appointed by the president subject to confirmation by the senate
- Chief Deputy United States Marshal: the senior career manager for the federal judicial district who is responsible for management of the Marshals office and staff
- Supervisory Deputy United States Marshal, responsible for the supervision of three or more deputy U.S. Marshals and clerks
- Deputy United States Marshal: for all nonsupervisory positions

=== Deputy Marshals ===
Deputy U.S. Marshals start their careers at the GS-5 to GS-7 pay grade. Once deputies graduate from the academy they are reclassified as 1811 Criminal Investigators. This allows them to work additional hours and receive an additional 25% Law Enforcement Availability Pay on top of their base pay. Prior to this, new deputies did not receive the 1811 Criminal Investigators until after they reached the GS-11 pay grade. This practice caused financial hardship and retention issues to new deputies coming into the agency in the past. After the first year in grade, they are promoted to GS-9, then to GS-11 after a second year, and then to GS-12 after a third year.

Duties performed include criminal investigations, execution of warrants, and other investigative operations. They also protect government officials, process seized assets of crime rings for investigative agencies, and relocate and arrange new identities for federal witnesses in the United States Federal Witness Protection Program, which is headed by the USMS. After Congress passed the Adam Walsh Act, the U.S. Marshals Service was chosen to head the new federal sex offender tracking and prosecution team.

Commissioned officers in the United States Coast Guard may be appointed as United States Deputy Marshals in Alaska.

=== Special Deputy Marshals ===
The director of the United States Marshals Service is authorized to deputize the following persons to perform the functions of a deputy U.S. Marshal in any district designated by the director:

- Selected officers or employees of the Department of Justice;
- Selected federal, state, or local law enforcement officers whenever the law enforcement needs of the U.S. Marshals Service so require;
- Selected employees of private security companies in providing courtroom security for the Federal judiciary;
- Other persons designated by the Associate Attorney General pursuant to 28 CFR 0.19(a)(3).

=== Court security officers ===
Court security officers (CSOs) are contracted former law enforcement officers who receive limited deputations as armed special deputy marshals and play a role in courthouse security. Using security screening systems, court security officers attempt to detect and intercept weapons and other prohibited items that individuals attempt to bring into federal courthouses. There are more than 5,000 court security officers with certified law enforcement experience deployed at more than 400 federal court facilities in the United States and its territories.

=== Inspectors ===
The Marshal Service has the positions of inspector, senior inspector and chief inspector, depending on the duties and position to which a deputy marshal has been assigned to. This title was created for promotions within the service usually for senior non-supervisory personnel. Senior deputy marshals assigned to regional fugitive task forces or working in special assignments requiring highly skilled criminal investigators often receive the title Inspector. Operational non-supervisory employees assigned to the Witness Protection Program are given the title Senior Inspector. Deputy Marshals assigned to the Organized Crime Drug Enforcement Task Force (OCDETF) department within the USMS also hold the title of Senior Inspector. Senior inspectors receive a GS-13 pay grade level.

=== Line-of-duty deaths ===
More than 200 U.S. Marshals, deputy marshals, and special deputy marshals have been killed in the line of duty since Marshal Robert Forsyth was shot dead by an intended recipient of court papers in Augusta, Georgia, on January 11, 1794. He was the first U.S. federal law enforcement officer to be killed in the line of duty. The dead are remembered on an honor roll permanently displayed at headquarters and at the United States Marshals' National Museum in Fort Smith, Arkansas.

=== Notable marshals and deputy marshals ===
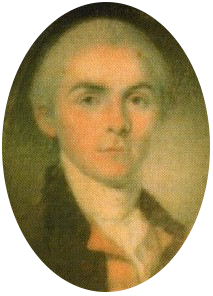
Robert Forsyth

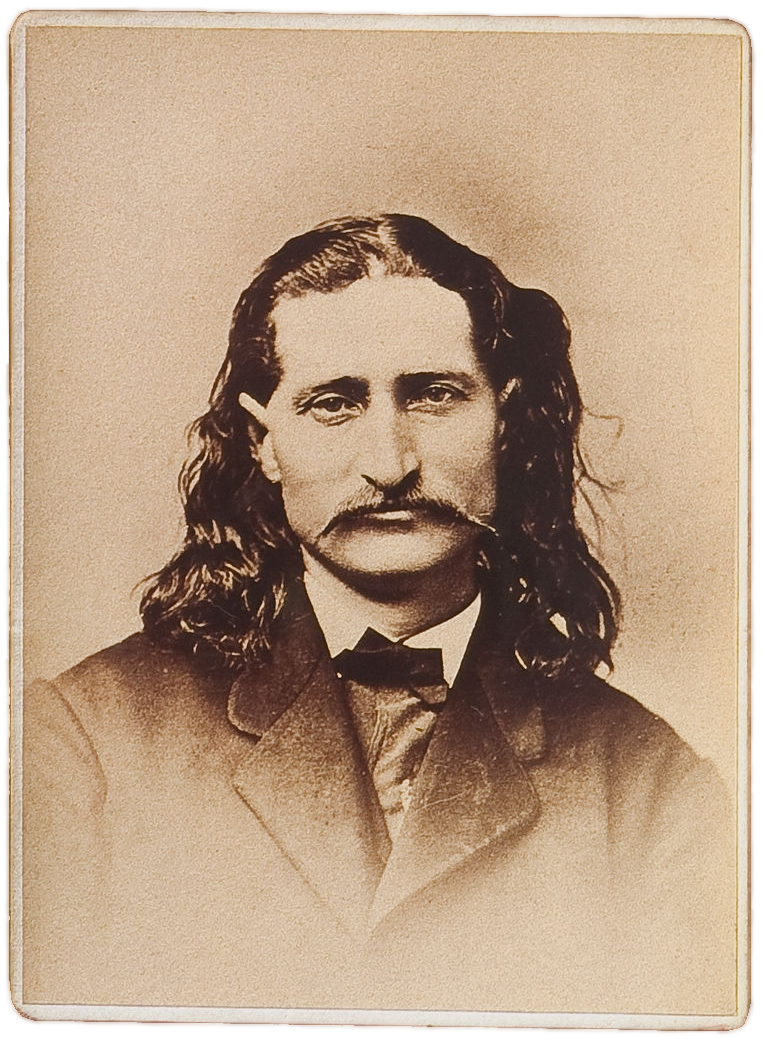
Wild Bill Hickok

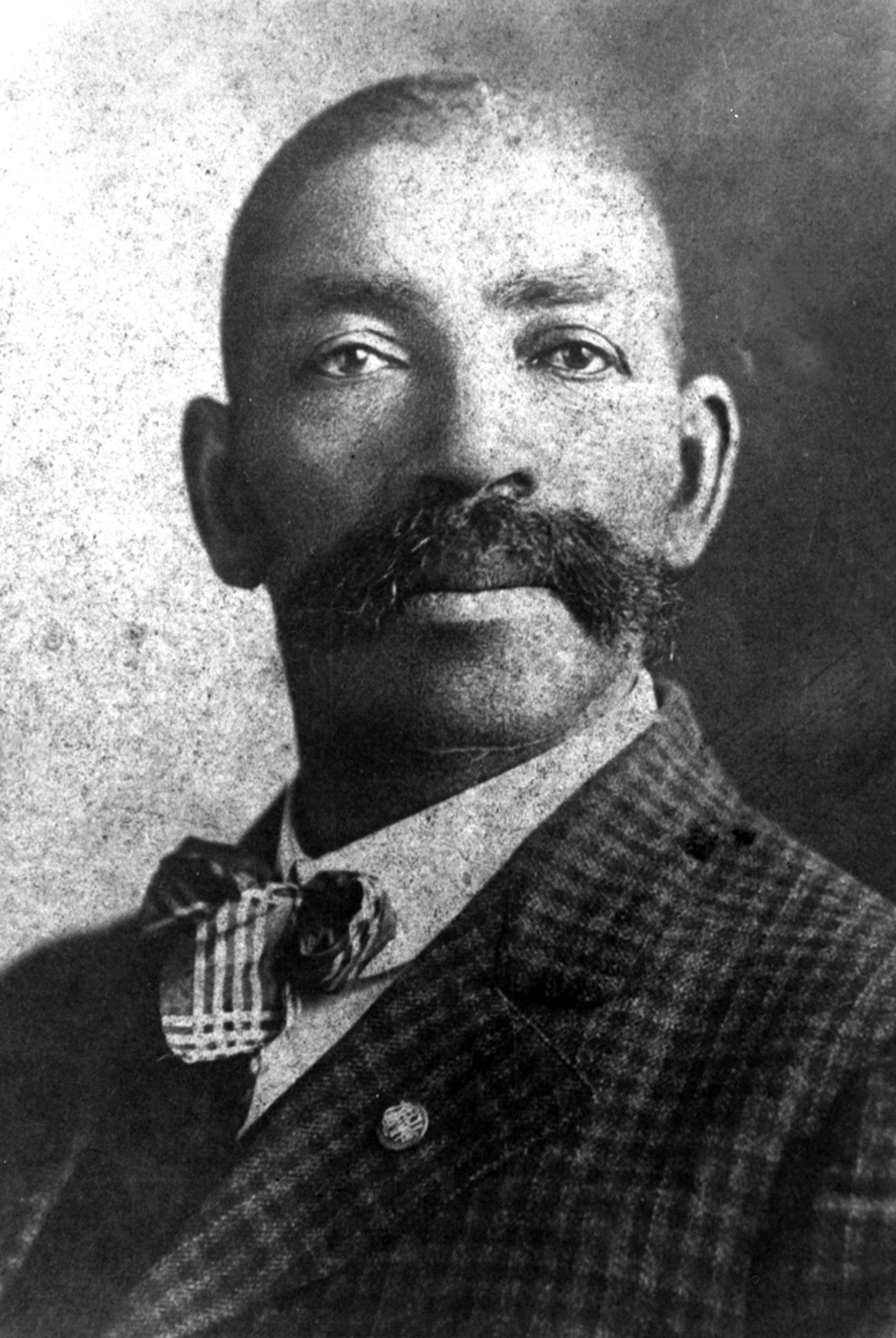
Bass Reeves

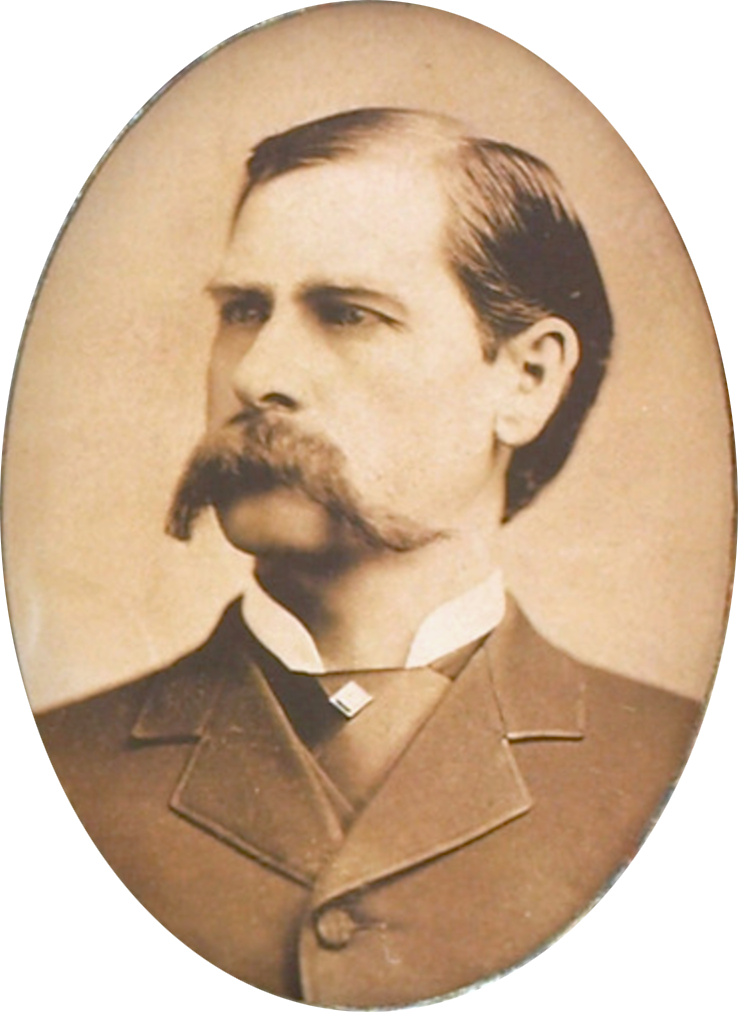
Wyatt Earp

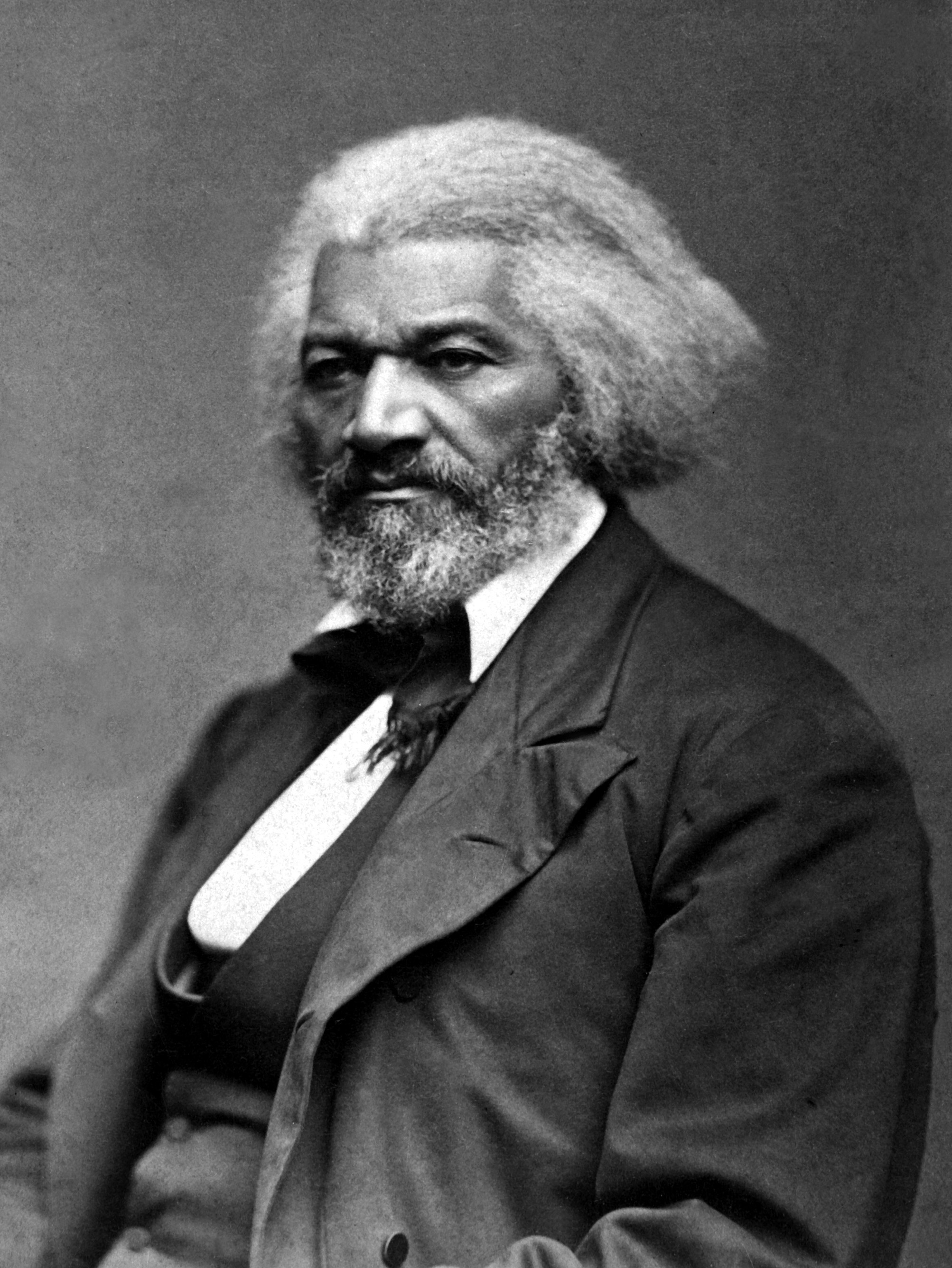
Frederick Douglass
- Nathaniel P. Banks (1816–1894), U.S. Marshal for Massachusetts 1879–1888
- Jesse D. Bright (1812–1875), U.S. Marshal for Indiana; later served as U.S. senator for that state
- Seth Bullock (1849–1919), businessman, rancher, sheriff for Montana, sheriff of Deadwood, South Dakota, U.S. Marshal of South Dakota
- John F. Clark, U.S. Marshals Service Director and U.S. Marshal for the Eastern District of Virginia
- Charles Francis Colcord (1859–1934), rancher, businessman and U.S. Marshal for Oklahoma
- Phoebe Couzins (1839–1913), lawyer, first woman appointed to the U.S. Marshals
- Henry Dearborn (1751–1829), U.S. Marshal for the District of Maine
- Frederick Douglass (1818–1895), former slave and noted abolitionist leader, appointed U.S. Marshal for the District of Columbia in 1877
- Virgil Earp (1843–1905), Deputy U.S. Marshal, Tombstone, Arizona.
- Wyatt Earp (1848–1929), Deputy U.S. Marshal (twice, first deputized in Arizona for the purpose of leading a federal posse, then in Nevada for a brief period, later in life).
  - James Earp (1841-1926), Special Deputy U.S. Marshal, as a member of Wyatt's federal posse.
  - Warren Earp (1855-1900), Special Deputy U.S. Marshal, as a member of Wyatt's federal posse.
- Robert Forsyth (1754-1794), first U.S. Marshal for the District of Georgia; first U.S. Marshal and federal law enforcement officer to be killed in the line of duty
- Richard Griffith (1814–1862), Brigadier General for the Confederacy during the Civil War
- Wild Bill Hickok (1837–1876), noted Western lawman; served as a Deputy U.S. Marshal at Fort Riley, Kansas 1867–1869
- Ward Hill Lamon (1826–1893), friend, and frequent bodyguard of President Abraham Lincoln, who appointed him U.S. Marshal for the District of Columbia
- James Longstreet (1832–1904), a former high-ranking Confederate general in the American Civil War who became a Republican and supporter of Reconstruction after the war. Appointed as U.S. Marshall for the Northern District of Georgia by James Garfield in June 1881 and served until July 1884.
- J. J. McAlester (1842–1920), U.S. Marshal for Indian Territory (1893–1897), Confederate Army captain, merchant in and founder of McAlester, Oklahoma as well as the developer of the coal mining industry in eastern Oklahoma, one of three members of the first Oklahoma Corporation Commission (1907–1911) and the second Lieutenant Governor of Oklahoma (1911–1915)
- Benjamin McCulloch (1811–1862), U.S. Marshal for Eastern District of Texas; became a brigadier general in the army of the Confederate States during the American Civil War
- Henry Eustace McCulloch (1816–1895), U.S. Marshal for Eastern District of Texas. Brother of Benjamin McCulloch; also a Confederate General
- James J. P. McShane (1909–1968), appointed U.S. Marshal for the District of Columbia by President John F. Kennedy then named chief marshal in 1962
- John W. Marshall, U.S. Marshal for the Eastern District of Virginia (1994–1999), first African-American to serve as Director of the U.S. Marshals Service (1999–2001)
- Bat Masterson (1853–1921), noted Western lawman; deputy to U.S. Marshal for the Southern District of New York, appointed by Theodore Roosevelt
- Joseph Meek (1810–1875), territorial marshal for Oregon
- Thomas Morris (1771–1849), U.S. Marshal for New York District
- David Neagle (1847–1925), shot former Chief Justice of California David S. Terry to protect US Supreme Court Justice Stephen Johnson Field, resulting in U.S. Supreme Court decision In re Neagle
- Israel C. O'Neal (1818-1899), Deputy U.S. Marshal for the Eastern District of Virginia and a member of the Virginia House of Delegates.
- Bob Pavlak (1924–1994), U.S. Marshal for the District of Minnesota and Minnesota legislator
- Henry Massey Rector (1816–1899), U.S. Marshal for Arkansas, later governor of that state
- Bass Reeves (July 1838 – January 1910), is thought by most to be one of the first Black men to receive a commission as a Deputy U.S. Marshal west of the Mississippi River. Before he retired from federal service in 1907, Reeves had arrested over 3,000 felons.
- Porter Rockwell (c.1813–1878), Deputy U.S. Marshal for Utah
- William Stephens Smith (1755–1816), 1789 U.S. Marshal for New York district and son-in-law of President John Adams
- Dallas Stoudenmire (1845–1882), successful city marshal who tamed and controlled the remote, wild and violent town of El Paso, Texas; became U.S. Marshal serving West Texas and New Mexico Territory just before his death
- Heck Thomas (1850–1912), Bill Tilghman (1854–1924), and Chris Madsen (1851–1944), the "Three Guardsmen" of the Oklahoma Territory
- William F. Wheeler (1824–1894), U.S. Marshal for the Montana Territory
- James E. Williams (1930–1999), U.S. Marshal for South Carolina, Medal of Honor recipient

== Criticism and controversy ==
=== Inspector General audits ===
An audit by the Office of Inspector General (OIG) (November 2010) of the Justice Department found "weaknesses in the USMS's efforts to secure federal court facilities in the six USMS district offices we visited". The report found, among other things, that the Marshals Service's Judicial Security Division had contracted private security firms to provide Court Security Officers without having completed background checks. Another incident involved the Marshals Service awarding a $300 million contract to a security guard company named USProtect Corporation, which had a known history of numerous criminal activities leading to convictions for mail fraud and bank fraud and false insurance claims in addition to a civil judgment against its chief financial officer. Technical problems included court security officers not being properly trained on security screening equipment, which also meant equipment not being used. The OIG noted that in February 2009, several courthouses failed to detect mock explosives sent by Marshals Service Headquarters in order to test security procedures. They also found that 18% of court security officers had outdated firearms qualifications.

=== Internal thefts ===
In January 2007, Deputy U.S. Marshal John Thomas Ambrose was charged with theft of Justice Department property, disclosure of confidential information, and lying to federal agents during an investigation. Deputy Ambrose had been in charge of protecting mobster-turned-informant Nicholas Calabrese, who was instrumental in sending three mob bosses to prison for life. A federal jury convicted Ambrose on April 27, 2009, of leaking secret government information concerning Calabrese to William Guide, a family friend and former Chicago police officer who had also served time in prison for corruption. Ambrose also was convicted of theft of government property but acquitted of lying to federal agents. On October 27, 2009, Ambrose was sentenced to serve four years in prison.

On March 26, 2009, the body of Deputy U.S. Marshal Vincent Bustamante was discovered in Juárez, Mexico, according to the Marshals Service. Bustamante, who was accused of stealing and pawning government property, was a fugitive from the law at the time of his death. Chihuahua State Police said the body had multiple wounds to the head – apparently consistent with an execution-style shooting.

=== Racial discrimination ===
In 1998, retired Chief Deputy U.S. Marshal Matthew Fogg won a landmark EEO and Title VII racial discrimination and retaliation lawsuit against the Justice Department, for which he was awarded $4 million. The jury found the entire Marshals Service to be a "racially hostile environment" which discriminates against black employees in its promotion practices. U.S. District Judge Thomas Penfield Jackson summarized the jurors' decision by stating that they felt there was an "atmosphere of racial disharmony and mistrust within the United States Marshal Service". As of 2011, Fogg is president of "Bigots with Badges", and executive director of CARCLE (Congress Against Racism and Corruption in Law Enforcement), and is also associated with Law Enforcement Against Prohibition (LEAP), a drug law reform organization of law enforcement officers.

In September 2023, U.S. Marshals Service settled a $15 million, nearly 30-year-old EEOC class action lawsuit filed by Matthew Fogg in January, 1994, alleging discrimination against African-American Deputy U.S. Marshal applicants, employees and Detention Officers with regard to hiring, promotions, recruitment and headquarter assignments.

=== Ruby Ridge ===
The Department of Justice under Janet Reno acknowledged wrongdoing in U.S. marshals' decisions surrounding a firefight at Ruby Ridge in 1992, where a deputy U.S. marshal shot 14-year-old Samuel Weaver in the back. Afterwards, deputy U.S. marshals became involved in a gunfight with Weaver's father, who was wanted on a federal warrant for failure to appear, and another person. Deputy U.S. marshals dispute this claim. Deputy U.S. marshal Billy Degan was killed during a surveillance operation after identifying himself as a federal agent. This led to an extended gunfight in which both sides fired several rounds. Samuel Weaver was shot and killed. His body was taken to a small building for more than a week and an autopsy was unable to determine entry and exit wounds (see Idaho Federal Court Transcripts for clarification of this incident). Newsweek described the incident as "one of the most shameful episodes in the history of American law enforcement".

== In popular culture ==
- Deputy Marshal Raylan Givens is the hero in the modern western crime TV series Justified and the spin-off miniseries Justified: City Primeval, both of which are based on Elmore Leonard stories.
- Deputy Marshal Karen Sisco is the subject of the crime comedy film Out of Sight, and a spin-off crime drama TV series, Karen Sisco. The character, created by Elmore Leonard, also appeared in a season 3 episode of Justified, while a second character, a police detective from Out of Sight, also appears in Justified: City Primeval.
- Marshal Matt Dillon is the lead in the Western drama radio and television series Gunsmoke.
- Deputy Marshal Mary Shannon is the lead in the crime drama TV series In Plain Sight.
- Deputy Marshal "Rooster" Cogburn features in the western novel True Grit, the two film versions thereof (1969 and 2010), and the first film's sequel, Rooster Cogburn.
- Deputy Marshal Wyatt Earp and his brothers Deputy Marshal Virgil, Special Deputy Marshal James and Special Deputy Marshal Warren, all based on real life U.S. Marshals, star in the western drama film Tombstone, one of many films and TV shows to feature the Earp brothers, along with brothers and local lawmen Morgan and Newton. This includes the film Wyatt Earp, TV series The Life and Legend of Wyatt Earp and streaming series Wyatt Earp and the Cowboy War.
- Deputy Marshal J. D. Cahill is the eponymous lead in the western drama film Cahill U.S. Marshal.
- Supervisory Deputy Marshal Samuel Gerard stars in the action thriller films The Fugitive, and its spin-off U.S. Marshals.
- Deputy Marshal Carrie Stetko stars in the crime thriller graphic novel Whiteout, and the 2009 film of the same name based on the novel, as the lone Deputy Marshal assigned to Amundsen–Scott South Pole Station in Antarctica.
- Deputy Marshal Winston MacBride is the protagonist in the action drama TV series The Marshal, as a lone marshal pursuing fugitives across the country.
- Deputy Marshal Vince Larkin is the lead in the action film Con Air, which largely takes place aboard a hijacked Marshals Service prisoner transport plane, nicknamed "Con Air".
- Deputy Marshal Annie Frost is principal character alongside a group of Marshals out of Houston who form the Fugitive Apprehension Team in the drama series Chase.
- A team of Deputy Marshals star in the action comedy TV series Eagleheart.
- Deputy Marshal James Anderson (retired) is a main character in the video game Outlaws.
- In the television series Marshals, Kayce John Dutton is a battle-hardened former Navy SEAL and rancher who joins an elite U.S. Marshals task force to bring "range justice" to the Montana wilderness while grappling with the recent loss of his wife.

== See also ==
- Federal law enforcement in the United States
- Law enforcement in the United States
