= 1880 United States presidential election in California =

- November 2, 1880
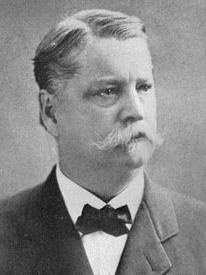

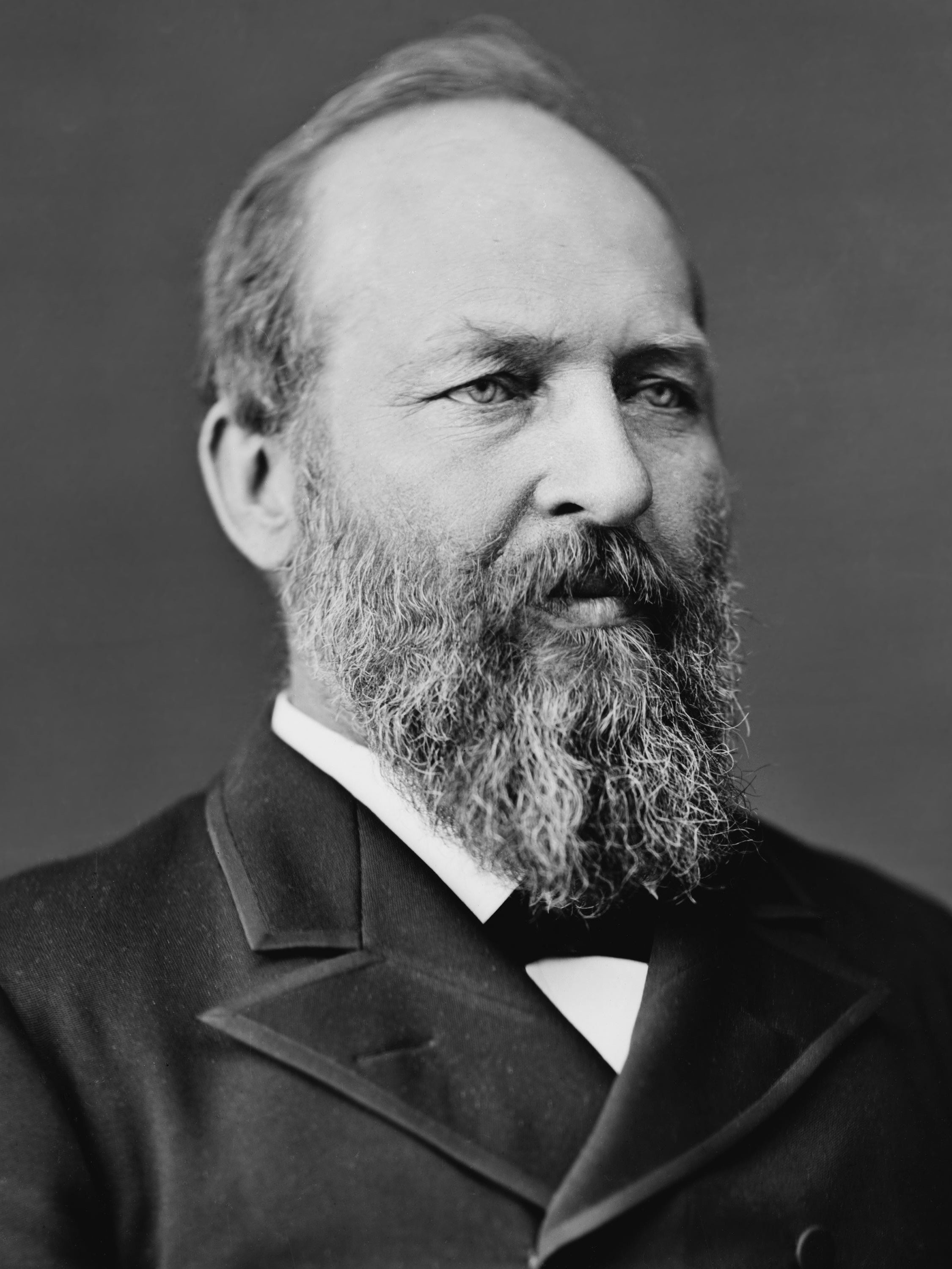
Nominee	Winfield Scott Hancock	James A. Garfield
Party	Democratic	Republican
Home state	Pennsylvania	Ohio
Running mate	William Hayden English	Chester A. Arthur
Electoral vote	5	1
Popular vote	80,442 (Note: Many sources give the Hancock vote as 80,426, which is the number of votes received by the first Democratic elector listed, but this figure is not the highest number of votes received by the Democratic ticket)	80,348 (Note: Many sources give the Garfield vote as 80,282, which is the number of votes received by the first Republican elector listed, but this figure is not the highest number of votes received by the Republican ticket)
Percentage	48.954%	48.897%
County results
Hancock
40–50%
50–60%
60–70%
Garfield
40–50%
50–60%
60–70%
President before election
Rutherford B. Hayes
Republican
Elected President
James A. Garfield
Republican

The 1880 United States presidential election in California was held on November 2, 1880, as part of the 1880 United States presidential election. State voters chose six representatives, or electors, to the Electoral College, who voted for president and vice president.

California narrowly voted for the Democratic nominee, United States Army officer Winfield Scott Hancock, over the Republican nominee, Ohio representative James A. Garfield. The 94-vote margin was the smallest in any statewide presidential election since Henry Clay won Maryland by only four votes in 1832, and as of 2024 it stands as by percentage of the vote the eleventh-closest statewide presidential election result on record – although California would later see even closer results in 1892 and 1912. (Note: Other closer results have been Florida in 2000 (closest), Maryland in 1904 (although voters voted for individual electors), Maryland in 1832, New Mexico in 2000, Kentucky in 1896 and Kentucky in 1952, Hawaii in 1960 and in New Hampshire in 1916.)

At the time, voters in California voted for individual electors, with the top six candidates being elected. One of the electors on the Democratic ticket was former Chief Justice David S. Terry, a controversial figure in California politics due to his killing of US Senator David C. Broderick in a duel in 1859. As a result, about five hundred Democratic voters scratched Terry's name off their ballots. Due to the closeness of the election, these lost votes caused Terry to receive fewer votes than the entire Republican ticket and thus a single Republican elector won the sixth-most votes to claim the last elector position. This was the first occasion in which California's electoral vote was split, rather than being awarded to a single candidate. This would subsequently occur in California three additional times in 1892, 1896, and 1912.

This result constituted the first Democratic victory in California since 1856 when the Republican Party had only recently formed. It has been argued that the unexpected Democratic win was due almost entirely to Garfield being viewed as weaker than Hancock on the hot-bed issue of controlling immigration from China – which both major parties promised to do and which the California electorate was overwhelmingly in favor of.

As a result of Garfield's loss, he became the first Republican to win the presidency without carrying California. This would not occur again until 120 years later. This was the first time ever that California voted for the losing candidate, which only occurred four times in the next 100 years- in 1884, 1912, 1960, and 1976.

== Results ==
General Election Results
Party	Pledged to	Elector	Votes
Democratic Party	Winfield Scott Hancock	R. F. Del Valle	80,442
Democratic Party	Winfield Scott Hancock	Barclay Henley	80,428
Democratic Party	Winfield Scott Hancock	William T. Wallace	80,426
Democratic Party	Winfield Scott Hancock	J. C. Shorb	80,420
Democratic Party	Winfield Scott Hancock	W. B. C. Brown	80,413
Republican Party	James A. Garfield	Henry Edgerton	80,348
Republican Party	James A. Garfield	John F. Miller	80,282
Republican Party	James A. Garfield	John A. Bauer	80,281
Republican Party	James A. Garfield	Thomas R. Bard	80,253
Republican Party	James A. Garfield	W. W. McKaig	80,245
Republican Party	James A. Garfield	Charles N. Fox	80,229
Democratic Party	Winfield Scott Hancock	David S. Terry	79,885 (Note: The state's official source gives 79,858 but this appears to be a misprint. Newspapers of the time all reported this figure as 79,885 and the county figures add up to the latter total.)
Greenback Party	James B. Weaver	J. E. Clark	3,394
Greenback Party	James B. Weaver	F. P. Dann	3,381
Greenback Party	James B. Weaver	James Kidney	3,378
Greenback Party	James B. Weaver	George T. Elliott	3,369
Greenback Party	James B. Weaver	T. J. McQuiddy	3,365
Greenback Party	James B. Weaver	J. H. Redstone	2,531
Greenback Party	James B. Weaver	B. K. Lowe	830 (Note: Appears to have replaced J. H. Redstone on some Greenback ballots)
Prohibition Party	Neal S. Dow	M. C. Winchester	61
Prohibition Party	Neal S. Dow	G. W. Caldwell	56
Prohibition Party	Neal S. Dow	W. O. Clark	56
Prohibition Party	Neal S. Dow	John Woods	56
Prohibition Party	Neal S. Dow	George Bramall	54
Prohibition Party	Neal S. Dow	G. W. Webb	49
Anti-Masonic Party	John W. Phelps	Liba Finch	6
Anti-Masonic Party	John W. Phelps	M. A. Harrow	6
Anti-Masonic Party	John W. Phelps	L. B. Lathrop	6
Anti-Masonic Party	John W. Phelps	D. Morrill	6
Anti-Masonic Party	John W. Phelps	P. Beck	5
Anti-Masonic Party	John W. Phelps	R. Metcalf	5
Write-in		Scattering	70
Votes cast (Note: Based on totals for highest elector on each ticket)			164,321

=== Results by county ===
County	Winfield Scott Hancock Democratic		James Abram Garfield Republican		James Baird Weaver Greenback		Neal S. Dow Prohibition		John W. Phelps Anti-Masonic		Scattering Write-in		Margin		Total votes cast (Note: Based on the highest elector on each ticket)
County	#	%	#	%	#	%	#	%	#	%	#	%	#	%	Total votes cast
Alameda	3,894	39.35%	5,897	59.58%	81	0.82%	0	0.00%	0	0.00%	25	0.25%	-2,003	-20.24%	9,897
Alpine	41	38.32%	66	61.68%	0	0.00%	0	0.00%	0	0.00%	0	0.00%	-25	-23.36%	107
Amador	1,411	51.12%	1,345	48.73%	4	0.14%	0	0.00%	0	0.00%	0	0.00%	66	2.39%	2,760
Butte	1,832	50.25%	1,814	49.75%	0	0.00%	0	0.00%	0	0.00%	0	0.00%	18	0.49%	3,646
Calaveras	1,137	49.18%	1,157	50.04%	18	0.78%	0	0.00%	0	0.00%	0	0.00%	-20	-0.87%	2,312
Colusa	1,607	64.49%	882	35.39%	3	0.12%	0	0.00%	0	0.00%	0	0.00%	725	29.09%	2,492
Contra Costa	1,010	43.69%	1,302	56.31%	0	0.00%	0	0.00%	0	0.00%	0	0.00%	-292	-12.63%	2,312
Del Norte	297	52.85%	263	46.80%	2	0.36%	0	0.00%	0	0.00%	0	0.00%	34	6.05%	562
El Dorado	1,520	51.30%	1,419	47.89%	24	0.81%	0	0.00%	0	0.00%	0	0.00%	101	3.41%	2,963
Fresno	1,133	64.60%	613	34.95%	8	0.46%	0	0.00%	0	0.00%	0	0.00%	520	29.65%	1,754
Humboldt	735	25.51%	1,420	49.29%	725	25.16%	1	0.03%	0	0.00%	0	0.00%	-685	-23.78%	2,881
Inyo	274	46.05%	321	53.95%	0	0.00%	0	0.00%	0	0.00%	0	0.00%	-47	-7.90%	595
Kern	661	58.44%	463	40.94%	7	0.62%	0	0.00%	0	0.00%	0	0.00%	198	17.51%	1,131
Lake	677	59.33%	454	39.79%	10	0.88%	0	0.00%	0	0.00%	0	0.00%	223	19.54%	1,141
Lassen	301	43.50%	323	46.68%	64	9.25%	2	0.29%	0	0.00%	2	0.29%	-22	-3.18%	692
Los Angeles	2,853	46.90%	2,914	47.90%	306	5.03%	10	0.16%	0	0.00%	0	0.00%	-61	-1.00%	6,083
Marin	561	41.71%	761	56.58%	23	1.71%	0	0.00%	0	0.00%	0	0.00%	-200	-14.87%	1,345
Mariposa	598	58.06%	432	41.94%	0	0.00%	0	0.00%	0	0.00%	0	0.00%	166	16.12%	1,030
Mendocino	1,313	57.34%	969	42.31%	4	0.17%	1	0.04%	0	0.00%	3	0.13%	344	15.02%	2,290
Merced	736	58.60%	516	41.08%	4	0.32%	0	0.00%	0	0.00%	0	0.00%	220	17.52%	1,256
Modoc	490	54.08%	410	45.25%	0	0.00%	6	0.66%	0	0.00%	0	0.00%	80	8.83%	906
Mono	821	46.36%	913	51.55%	22	1.24%	8	0.45%	0	0.00%	8	0.45%	-92	-5.19%	1,772
Monterey	1,205	48.16%	1,260	50.36%	37	1.48%	0	0.00%	0	0.00%	0	0.00%	-55	-2.20%	2,502
Napa	1,082	46.84%	1,199	51.90%	26	1.13%	3	0.13%	0	0.00%	0	0.00%	-117	-5.06%	2,310
Nevada	2,029	47.27%	2,241	52.21%	22	0.51%	0	0.00%	0	0.00%	0	0.00%	-212	-4.94%	4,292
Placer	1,416	45.43%	1,643	52.71%	58	1.86%	0	0.00%	0	0.00%	0	0.00%	-227	-7.28%	3,117
Plumas	645	47.99%	698	51.93%	1	0.07%	0	0.00%	0	0.00%	0	0.00%	-53	-3.94%	1,344
Sacramento	2,817	41.66%	3,794	56.11%	150	2.22%	0	0.00%	0	0.00%	1	0.01%	-977	-14.45%	6,762
San Benito	646	59.81%	429	39.72%	4	0.37%	0	0.00%	1	0.09%	0	0.00%	217	20.09%	1,080
San Bernardino	711	47.81%	730	49.09%	46	3.09%	0	0.00%	0	0.00%	0	0.00%	-19	-1.28%	1,487
San Diego	546	41.74%	743	56.80%	19	1.45%	0	0.00%	0	0.00%	0	0.00%	-197	-15.06%	1,308
San Francisco	21,471	52.06%	19,080	46.27%	672	1.63%	0	0.00%	0	0.00%	16	0.04%	2,391	5.80%	41,239
San Joaquin	2,409	48.32%	2,568	51.51%	7	0.14%	0	0.00%	1	0.02%	0	0.00%	-159	-3.19%	4,985
San Luis Obispo	729	41.99%	830	47.81%	171	9.85%	6	0.35%	0	0.00%	0	0.00%	-101	-5.82%	1,736
San Mateo	720	48.32%	760	51.01%	10	0.67%	0	0.00%	0	0.00%	0	0.00%	-40	-2.68%	1,490
Santa Barbara	717	37.38%	907	47.29%	293	15.28%	0	0.00%	0	0.00%	1	0.05%	-190	-9.91%	1,918
Santa Clara	2,821	46.67%	3,113	51.50%	105	1.74%	0	0.00%	0	0.00%	6	0.10%	-292	-4.83%	6,045
Santa Cruz	1,102	44.96%	1,236	50.43%	110	4.49%	2	0.08%	0	0.00%	1	0.04%	-134	-5.47%	2,451
Shasta	877	49.97%	868	49.46%	10	0.57%	0	0.00%	0	0.00%	0	0.00%	9	0.51%	1,755
Sierra	559	35.65%	997	63.58%	12	0.77%	0	0.00%	0	0.00%	0	0.00%	-438	-27.93%	1,568
Siskiyou	900	52.36%	800	46.54%	18	1.05%	1	0.06%	0	0.00%	0	0.00%	100	5.82%	1,719
Solano	1,959	49.70%	1,963	49.80%	13	0.33%	0	0.00%	0	0.00%	7	0.18%	-4	-0.10%	3,942
Sonoma	2,628	52.14%	2,290	45.44%	111	2.20%	11	0.22%	0	0.00%	0	0.00%	338	6.71%	5,040
Stanislaus	1,161	60.69%	752	39.31%	0	0.00%	0	0.00%	0	0.00%	0	0.00%	409	21.38%	1,913
Sutter	591	49.33%	602	50.25%	0	0.00%	5	0.42%	0	0.00%	0	0.00%	-11	-0.92%	1,198
Tehama	954	52.33%	868	47.61%	1	0.05%	0	0.00%	0	0.00%	0	0.00%	86	4.72%	1,823
Trinity	457	49.14%	464	49.89%	9	0.97%	0	0.00%	0	0.00%	0	0.00%	-7	-0.75%	930
Tulare	1,306	55.13%	917	38.71%	146	6.16%	0	0.00%	0	0.00%	0	0.00%	389	16.42%	2,369
Tuolumne	1,001	51.65%	922	47.57%	15	0.77%	0	0.00%	0	0.00%	0	0.00%	79	4.08%	1,938
Ventura	522	46.40%	599	53.24%	4	0.36%	0	0.00%	0	0.00%	0	0.00%	-77	-6.84%	1,125
Yolo	1,374	51.83%	1,256	47.38%	12	0.45%	5	0.19%	4	0.15%	0	0.00%	118	4.45%	2,651
Yuba	1,185	50.28%	1,165	49.43%	7	0.30%	0	0.00%	0	0.00%	0	0.00%	20	0.85%	2,357
Total	80,442	48.954%	80,348	48.897%	3,394	2.07%	61	0.04%	6	0.00%	70	0.04%	94	0.057%	164,321

==== Counties that flipped from Republican to Democratic ====
- Butte
- San Francisco
- Yuba

==== Counties that flipped from Democratic to Republican ====
- Calaveras
- Inyo
- Los Angeles
- San Luis Obispo
- Sutter
- Trinity

== See also ==
- United States presidential elections in California
