= 1912 United States presidential election in California =

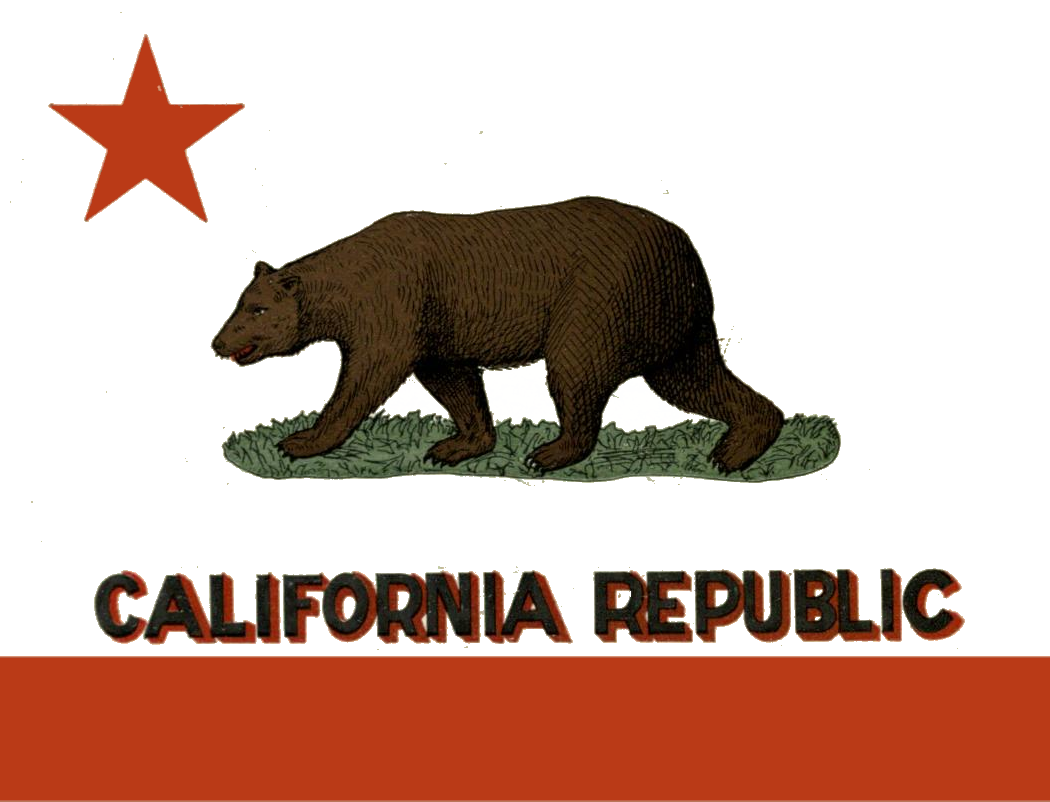
- November 5, 1912
- Turnout: 71.68% (of registered voters); 45.11% (of eligible voters)
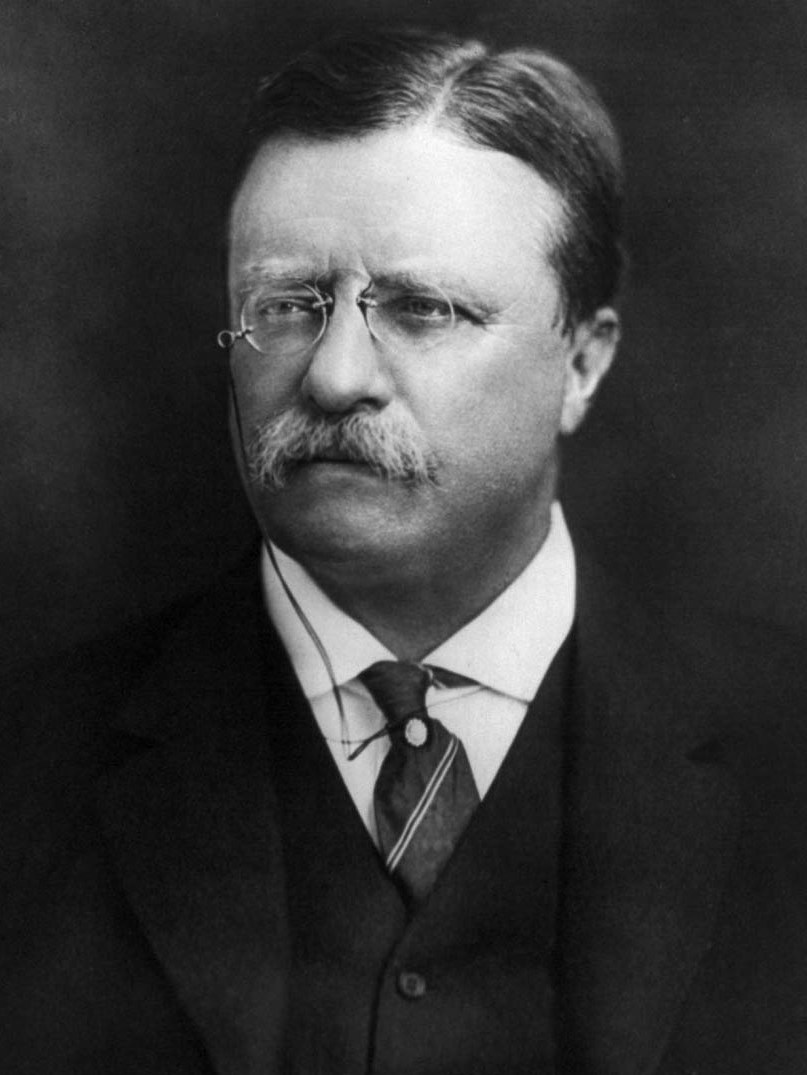

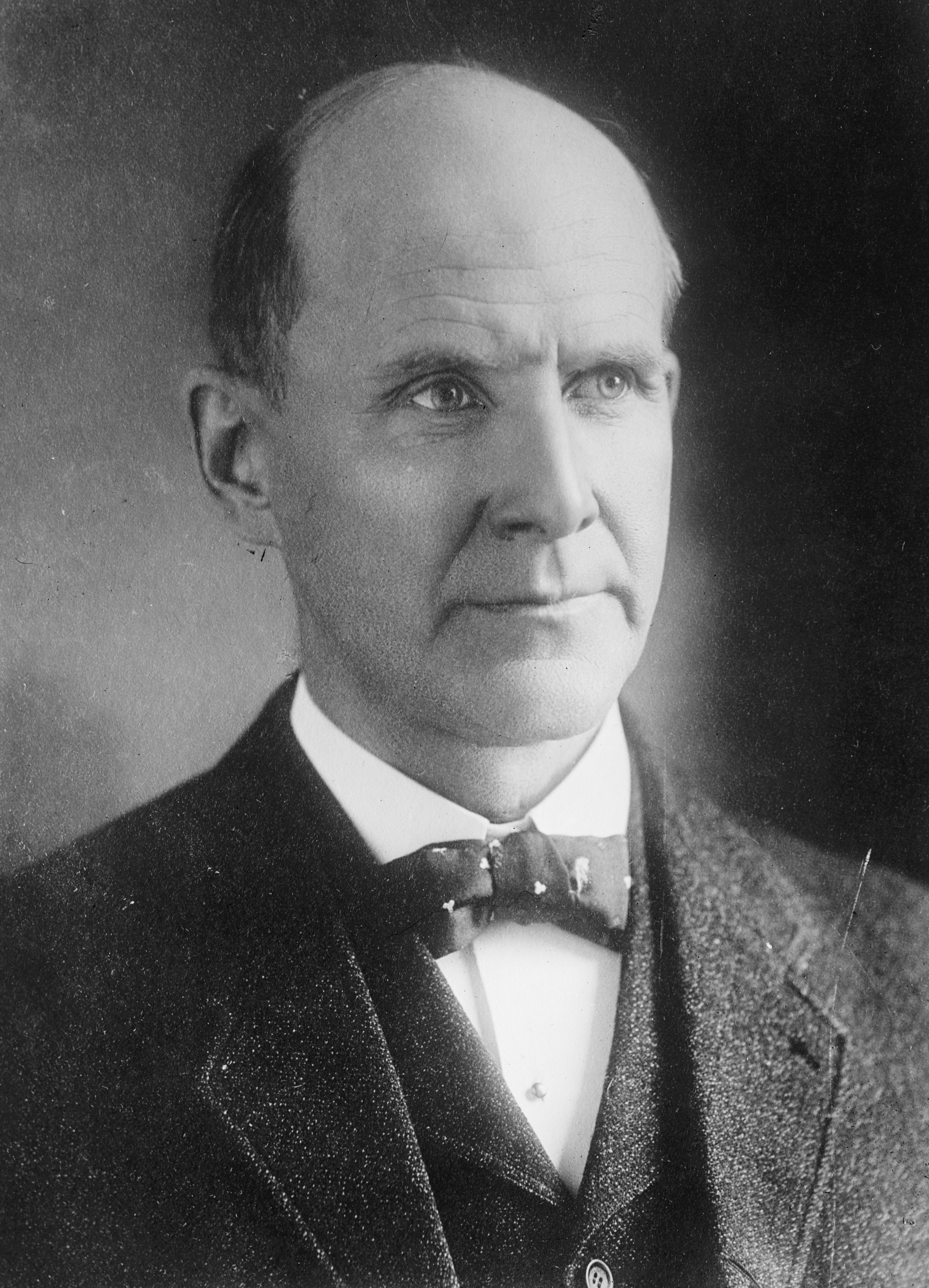
Nominee	Theodore Roosevelt	Woodrow Wilson	Eugene V. Debs
Party	Progressive	Democratic	Socialist
Alliance	Republican
Home state	New York	New Jersey	Indiana
Running mate	Hiram Johnson	Thomas R. Marshall	Emil Seidel
Electoral vote	11	2	0
Popular vote	283,610	283,436	79,201
Percentage	41.83%	41.81%	11.68%
County results
Roosevelt
30–40%
40–50%
50–60%
Wilson
40–50%
50–60%
60–70%
President before election
William Howard Taft
Republican
Elected President
Woodrow Wilson
Democratic

The 1912 United States presidential election in California took place on November 5, 1912, as part of the 1912 United States presidential election. State voters chose 13 representatives, or electors, to the Electoral College, who voted for president and vice president. Theodore Roosevelt received 11 electors by winning 174 more votes than Woodrow Wilson, who received 2 electors. This was the closest presidential election in California history.

California narrowly voted for the Progressive Party nominee, former president Theodore Roosevelt, over the Democratic nominee, New Jersey Governor Woodrow Wilson, though two electors cast their votes for Wilson. Although Roosevelt was the candidate of the “Bull Moose” Progressive Party nationally, in California and South Dakota he gained the support of the state Republican Party and acquired the "Republican" line, whilst the incumbent, and national GOP nominee William Howard Taft did not appear on the ballot and was a write-in candidate. (Note: Other incumbent Presidents not on the ballot in all states have been Benjamin Harrison in Florida in 1892, Taft in South Dakota during this 1912 election, Harry S. Truman in Alabama in 1948, and Lyndon B. Johnson also in Alabama in 1964.) Roosevelt's running mate was incumbent Governor of California Hiram Johnson.

This was the closest presidential election in California history, with Roosevelt winning by just 174 votes out of 677,944 cast, a margin of 0.02567%. It remains the fourth-closest presidential race in any state in history, behind Florida in 2000, Maryland in 1832, and Maryland in 1904, the latter of which also involved Roosevelt. (Note: Although Roosevelt won Maryland by fifty-one votes, voters in Maryland in those days voted for individual electors and only one Republican, elector, Charles Bonaparte, survived the tally. The other seven top vote recipients were Democrats.)

Although Wilson narrowly failed to win the state, he did become the first Democrat to carry Napa, Solano (Note: "Southern Democrat" John Breckinridge (Buchanan's Vice-President) did carry Solano County in 1860) and Marin Counties since James Buchanan in 1856, the first to carry San Mateo and Sierra County since Stephen A. Douglas in 1860, the first to win San Diego County since 1868, the first to ever carry Ventura County, which had been created in 1872, and the first to carry Calaveras County and Sutter County since 1876. Since this election, Solano County has voted Democratic in all but six Republican landslide elections of 1920, 1924, 1928, 1972, 1980 and 1984.

With 41.83% of the popular vote, California would prove to be Roosevelt's second-strongest state in terms of popular vote percentage in the 1912 election after South Dakota. California would not vote for the losing candidate again until 1960.

== Votes cast for individual electors ==
This was the fourth occasion in which California's electoral vote was split, rather than being awarded to a single candidate. The previous occasions when this happened were in 1880, 1892, and 1896. This occurred because, at the time, electors were not awarded based upon the popular vote in the presidential preference vote. Instead, voters cast votes for individual electors, with the thirteen top vote-getters among elector nominees becoming elected the state's members of the United States Electoral College. A split in the electoral vote would never again occur in California.

== Results ==
=== Results by Elector ===
General Election Results
Party	Pledged to	Elector	Votes
Republican Party (Progressive)	Theodore Roosevelt	A. J. Wallace	283,610
Democratic Party	Woodrow Wilson	Thomas F. Griffin	283,436
Republican Party (Progressive)	Theodore Roosevelt	Charles S. Wheeler	283,193
Republican Party (Progressive)	Theodore Roosevelt	George C. Pardee	283,057
Republican Party (Progressive)	Theodore Roosevelt	Marshall Stimson	282,910
Republican Party (Progressive)	Theodore Roosevelt	Philip Bancroft	282,888
Republican Party (Progressive)	Theodore Roosevelt	John P. McLaughlin	282,868
Republican Party (Progressive)	Theodore Roosevelt	Frank H. Devlin	282,790
Republican Party (Progressive)	Theodore Roosevelt	Florence Collins Porter	282,781
Republican Party (Progressive)	Theodore Roosevelt	R. G. Fernald	282,676
Republican Party (Progressive)	Theodore Roosevelt	M. B. Harris	282,671
Republican Party (Progressive)	Theodore Roosevelt	Ralph W. Bull	282,653
Democratic Party	Woodrow Wilson	R. F. Del Valle	282,651
Republican Party (Progressive)	Theodore Roosevelt	J. W. Finney	282,594
Democratic Party	Woodrow Wilson	Henry E. Monroe	282,594
Democratic Party	Woodrow Wilson	T. W. H. Shanahan	282,579
Democratic Party	Woodrow Wilson	Clarence F. Lea	282,578
Democratic Party	Woodrow Wilson	Joseph F. Tobin	282,530
Democratic Party	Woodrow Wilson	F. B. Lynch	282,516
Democratic Party	Woodrow Wilson	Stephen J. Sill	282,432
Republican Party (Progressive)	Theodore Roosevelt	M. A. Luce	282,383
Democratic Party	Woodrow Wilson	George W. Mordecai	282,325
Democratic Party	Woodrow Wilson	E. L. Doheny	282,309
Democratic Party	Woodrow Wilson	Mary Bourn Tucker	282,215
Democratic Party	Woodrow Wilson	Mary E. Foy	282,213
Democratic Party	Woodrow Wilson	George M. Cooley	282,198
Socialist Party	Eugene V. Debs	W. M. Boyd	79,201
Socialist Party	Eugene V. Debs	Job Harriman	78,910
Socialist Party	Eugene V. Debs	Dr. A. E. Briggs	78,905
Socialist Party	Eugene V. Debs	H. F. Whitley	78,867
Socialist Party	Eugene V. Debs	T. W. Williams	78,860
Socialist Party	Eugene V. Debs	James Andrews	78,813
Socialist Party	Eugene V. Debs	Rose Walker	78,791
Socialist Party	Eugene V. Debs	Jennie Ream	78,757
Socialist Party	Eugene V. Debs	H. J. Duffy	78,740
Socialist Party	Eugene V. Debs	Ida Kinney	78,735
Socialist Party	Eugene V. Debs	J. R. Cothran	78,709
Socialist Party	Eugene V. Debs	Ethel Lynn	78,689
Socialist Party	Eugene V. Debs	Mary Garbutt	78,534
Prohibition Party	Eugene W. Chafin	Annie E. K. Bidwell	23,366
Prohibition Party	Eugene W. Chafin	Stephen H. Taft	23,265
Prohibition Party	Eugene W. Chafin	Frank Willard Emerson	23,144
Prohibition Party	Eugene W. Chafin	Ellsworth L. Rich	23,053
Prohibition Party	Eugene W. Chafin	Lucy S. Blanchard	23,052
Prohibition Party	Eugene W. Chafin	William P. Fassett	23,040
Prohibition Party	Eugene W. Chafin	Frederick Head	23,010
Prohibition Party	Eugene W. Chafin	Stella B. Irvine	23,004
Prohibition Party	Eugene W. Chafin	Henry French	23,001
Prohibition Party	Eugene W. Chafin	Simeon P. Meads	22,997
Prohibition Party	Eugene W. Chafin	Byron E. Paddock	22,995
Prohibition Party	Eugene W. Chafin	Edward F. Van Vlear	22,988
Prohibition Party	Eugene W. Chafin	Thomas K. Bear	22,983
Republican Party	William Howard Taft	Anson S. Blake	3,914
Republican Party	William Howard Taft	Fred A. Dodge	3,908
Republican Party	William Howard Taft	Arthur E. Miller	3,903
Republican Party	William Howard Taft	Jotham Bixby	3,902
Republican Party	William Howard Taft	Charles N. Felton	3,896
Republican Party	William Howard Taft	Norman Bridge	3,783
Republican Party	William Howard Taft	Ross Campbell	3,753
Republican Party	William Howard Taft	Charles E. Clinch	3,677
Republican Party	William Howard Taft	Mrs. K. M. Flynn	3,582
Republican Party	William Howard Taft	Joseph Martin	3,525
Republican Party	William Howard Taft	Robert Sweeney	3,313
Republican Party	William Howard Taft	Simon Levi	3,057
Republican Party	William Howard Taft	Andrea Sbarboro	2,847
Write-in		Scattering	4,417
Votes cast (Note: Based on totals for highest elector on each ticket)			677,944

=== Results by county ===
County	Theodore Roosevelt Republican/Progressive "Bull Moose"		Woodrow Wilson Democratic		Eugene V. Debs Socialist		Eugene W. Chafin Prohibition		William Howard Taft Republican (write-in)		Scattering Write-in		Margin		Total votes cast (Note: Based on the highest elector on each ticket)
County	#	%	#	%	#	%	#	%	#	%	#	%	#	%	Total votes cast
Alameda	31,542	47.47%	24,418	36.75%	9,332	14.04%	1,160	1.75%	0	0.00%	0	0.00%	7,124	10.72%	66,452
Alpine	36	45.00%	34	42.50%	2	2.50%	0	0.00%	8	10.00%	0	0.00%	2	2.50%	80
Amador	684	27.33%	1,622	64.80%	135	5.39%	57	2.28%	5	0.20%	0	0.00%	-938	-37.48%	2,503
Butte	3,365	38.14%	4,028	45.66%	930	10.54%	489	5.54%	10	0.11%	0	0.00%	-663	-7.52%	8,822
Calaveras	750	24.28%	1,869	60.51%	399	12.92%	66	2.14%	5	0.16%	0	0.00%	-1,119	-36.23%	3,089
Colusa	810	29.26%	1,760	63.58%	111	4.01%	84	3.03%	3	0.11%	0	0.00%	-950	-34.32%	2,768
Contra Costa	3,539	42.38%	3,290	39.40%	1,300	15.57%	181	2.17%	40	0.48%	0	0.00%	249	2.98%	8,350
Del Norte	376	44.60%	323	38.32%	104	12.34%	40	4.74%	0	0.00%	0	0.00%	53	6.29%	843
El Dorado	776	28.40%	1,613	59.04%	278	10.18%	49	1.79%	16	0.59%	0	0.00%	-837	-30.64%	2,732
Fresno	8,839	42.71%	8,891	42.96%	2,278	11.01%	590	2.85%	95	0.46%	3	0.01%	-52	-0.25%	20,696
Glenn	906	37.21%	1,325	54.41%	126	5.17%	67	2.75%	11	0.45%	0	0.00%	-419	-17.21%	2,435
Humboldt	3,609	42.20%	2,887	33.76%	1,781	20.83%	177	2.07%	93	1.09%	5	0.06%	722	8.44%	8,552
Imperial	1,420	42.17%	1,295	38.46%	446	13.25%	193	5.73%	13	0.39%	0	0.00%	125	3.71%	3,367
Inyo	431	26.49%	806	49.54%	305	18.75%	77	4.73%	8	0.49%	0	0.00%	-375	-23.05%	1,627
Kern	3,647	33.88%	5,569	51.73%	1,300	12.08%	182	1.69%	67	0.62%	0	0.00%	-1,922	-17.85%	10,765
Kings	1,419	35.94%	1,967	49.82%	406	10.28%	156	3.95%	0	0.00%	0	0.00%	-548	-13.88%	3,948
Lake	649	30.10%	1,118	51.86%	266	12.34%	123	5.71%	0	0.00%	0	0.00%	-469	-21.75%	2,156
Lassen	559	39.59%	644	45.61%	148	10.48%	34	2.41%	27	1.91%	0	0.00%	-85	-6.02%	1,412
Los Angeles	75,593	45.73%	55,110	33.34%	19,895	12.04%	8,190	4.95%	2,181	1.32%	4,327	2.62%	20,483	12.39%	165,296
Madera	943	38.98%	1,154	47.71%	226	9.34%	89	3.68%	1	0.04%	6	0.25%	-211	-8.72%	2,419
Marin	2,750	42.97%	2,849	44.52%	733	11.45%	68	1.06%	0	0.00%	0	0.00%	-99	-1.55%	6,400
Mariposa	306	26.15%	689	58.89%	138	11.79%	17	1.45%	20	1.71%	0	0.00%	-393	-32.74%	1,170
Mendocino	2,237	39.61%	2,507	44.39%	752	13.31%	141	2.50%	11	0.19%	0	0.00%	-270	-4.78%	5,648
Merced	1,571	37.16%	1,978	46.78%	441	10.43%	228	5.39%	10	0.24%	0	0.00%	-407	-9.63%	4,228
Modoc	608	35.47%	941	54.90%	119	6.94%	45	2.63%	1	0.06%	0	0.00%	-333	-19.43%	1,714
Mono	106	28.73%	182	49.32%	67	18.16%	11	2.98%	3	0.81%	0	0.00%	-76	-20.60%	369
Monterey	3,081	42.02%	3,392	46.26%	557	7.60%	301	4.11%	1	0.01%	0	0.00%	-311	-4.24%	7,332
Napa	2,432	42.52%	2,662	46.55%	478	8.36%	126	2.20%	0	0.00%	21	0.37%	-230	-4.02%	5,719
Nevada	1,381	34.40%	1,851	46.11%	648	16.14%	111	2.77%	23	0.57%	0	0.00%	-470	-11.71%	4,014
Orange	5,143	45.03%	4,406	38.58%	896	7.85%	852	7.46%	123	1.08%	1	0.01%	737	6.45%	11,421
Placer	1,913	43.91%	1,823	41.84%	481	11.04%	125	2.87%	15	0.34%	0	0.00%	90	2.07%	4,357
Plumas	762	42.78%	742	41.66%	236	13.25%	30	1.68%	11	0.62%	0	0.00%	20	1.12%	1,781
Riverside	5,146	50.94%	2,963	29.33%	1,036	10.25%	834	8.25%	124	1.23%	0	0.00%	2,183	21.61%	10,103
Sacramento	7,534	39.23%	9,869	51.39%	1,553	8.09%	213	1.11%	36	0.19%	0	0.00%	-2,335	-12.16%	19,205
San Benito	1,054	40.96%	1,253	48.70%	179	6.96%	74	2.88%	13	0.51%	0	0.00%	-199	-7.73%	2,573
San Bernardino	6,202	40.42%	5,835	38.03%	1,901	12.39%	1,233	8.04%	172	1.12%	0	0.00%	367	2.39%	15,343
San Diego	7,922	36.46%	9,731	44.79%	2,873	13.22%	1,139	5.24%	63	0.29%	0	0.00%	-1,809	-8.33%	21,728
San Francisco	38,610	38.17%	48,953	48.40%	12,354	12.21%	1,158	1.14%	65	0.06%	8	0.01%	-10,343	-10.23%	101,148
San Joaquin	4,314	31.40%	7,969	58.00%	995	7.24%	426	3.10%	35	0.25%	0	0.00%	-3,655	-26.60%	13,739
San Luis Obispo	2,373	42.73%	2,248	40.48%	704	12.68%	214	3.85%	13	0.23%	1	0.02%	125	2.25%	5,553
San Mateo	2,825	40.44%	3,246	46.47%	827	11.84%	80	1.15%	7	0.10%	0	0.00%	-421	-6.03%	6,985
Santa Barbara	3,395	46.78%	2,819	38.84%	619	8.53%	357	4.92%	68	0.94%	0	0.00%	576	7.94%	7,258
Santa Clara	10,868	46.97%	9,173	39.64%	2,068	8.94%	824	3.56%	173	0.75%	33	0.14%	1,695	7.33%	23,139
Santa Cruz	3,059	42.77%	2,875	40.20%	892	12.47%	323	4.52%	3	0.04%	0	0.00%	184	2.57%	7,152
Shasta	1,636	34.93%	2,040	43.55%	938	20.03%	54	1.15%	16	0.34%	0	0.00%	-404	-8.63%	4,684
Sierra	483	41.71%	515	44.47%	133	11.49%	13	1.12%	10	0.86%	4	0.35%	-32	-2.76%	1,158
Siskiyou	1,740	34.99%	2,465	49.57%	633	12.73%	104	2.09%	29	0.58%	2	0.04%	-725	-14.58%	4,973
Solano	3,353	41.95%	3,650	45.66%	781	9.77%	169	2.11%	40	0.50%	0	0.00%	-297	-3.72%	7,993
Sonoma	5,806	40.89%	6,500	45.78%	1,494	10.52%	367	2.58%	32	0.23%	0	0.00%	-694	-4.89%	14,199
Stanislaus	3,143	39.78%	3,127	39.58%	749	9.48%	864	10.94%	17	0.22%	0	0.00%	16	0.20%	7,900
Sutter	846	41.11%	1,063	51.65%	79	3.84%	65	3.16%	5	0.24%	0	0.00%	-217	-10.54%	2,058
Tehama	1,218	36.01%	1,595	47.16%	388	11.47%	168	4.97%	13	0.38%	0	0.00%	-377	-11.15%	3,382
Trinity	343	34.44%	461	46.29%	182	18.27%	9	0.90%	1	0.10%	0	0.00%	-118	-11.85%	996
Tulare	4,283	42.21%	4,293	42.31%	1,233	12.15%	265	2.61%	73	0.72%	0	0.00%	-10	-0.10%	10,147
Tuolumne	755	28.76%	1,459	55.58%	363	13.83%	38	1.45%	8	0.30%	2	0.08%	-704	-26.82%	2,625
Ventura	2,055	42.52%	2,108	43.62%	426	8.81%	169	3.50%	71	1.47%	4	0.08%	-53	-1.10%	4,833
Yolo	1,332	33.35%	2,239	56.06%	301	7.54%	113	2.83%	9	0.23%	0	0.00%	-907	-22.71%	3,994
Yuba	1,132	43.36%	1,242	47.57%	186	7.12%	34	1.30%	17	0.65%	0	0.00%	-110	-4.21%	2,611
Total	283,610	41.834%	283,436	41.808%	79,201	11.68%	23,366	3.45%	3,914	0.58%	4,417	0.65%	174	0.026%	677,944

=== Counties that flipped from Republican to Democratic ===
- Amador
- Butte
- Calaveras
- Fresno
- Kern
- Kings
- Lassen
- Madera
- Marin
- Mendocino
- Merced
- Modoc
- Mono
- Monterey
- Napa
- Nevada
- Sacramento
- San Benito
- San Diego
- San Francisco
- San Joaquin
- San Mateo
- Shasta
- Sierra
- Siskiyou
- Solano
- Sonoma
- Sutter
- Tehama
- Tulare
- Trinity
- Tuolumne
- Ventura
- Yolo
- Yuba

== See also ==
- United States presidential elections in California
