= 1892 United States presidential election in California =

- November 8, 1892

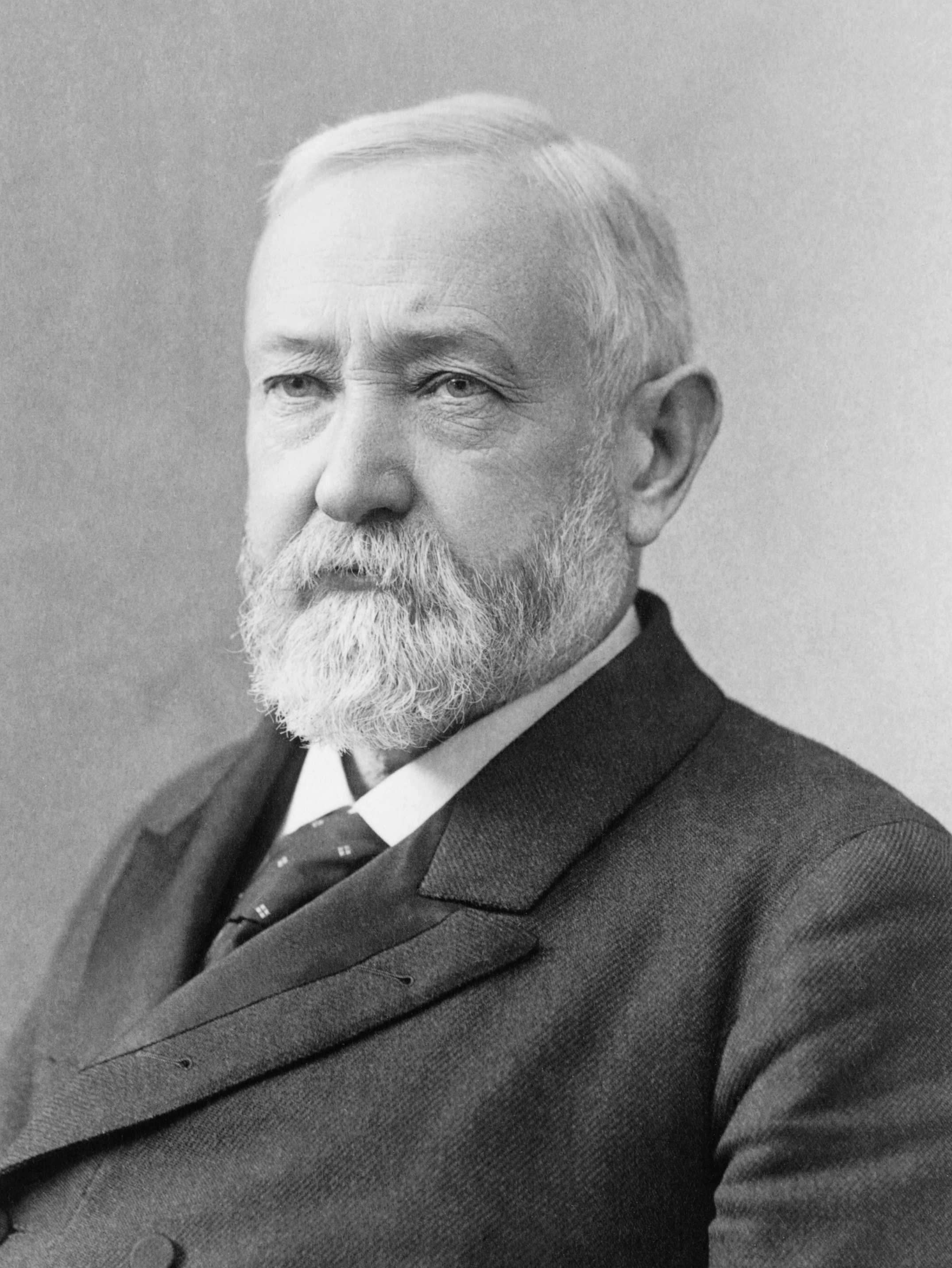

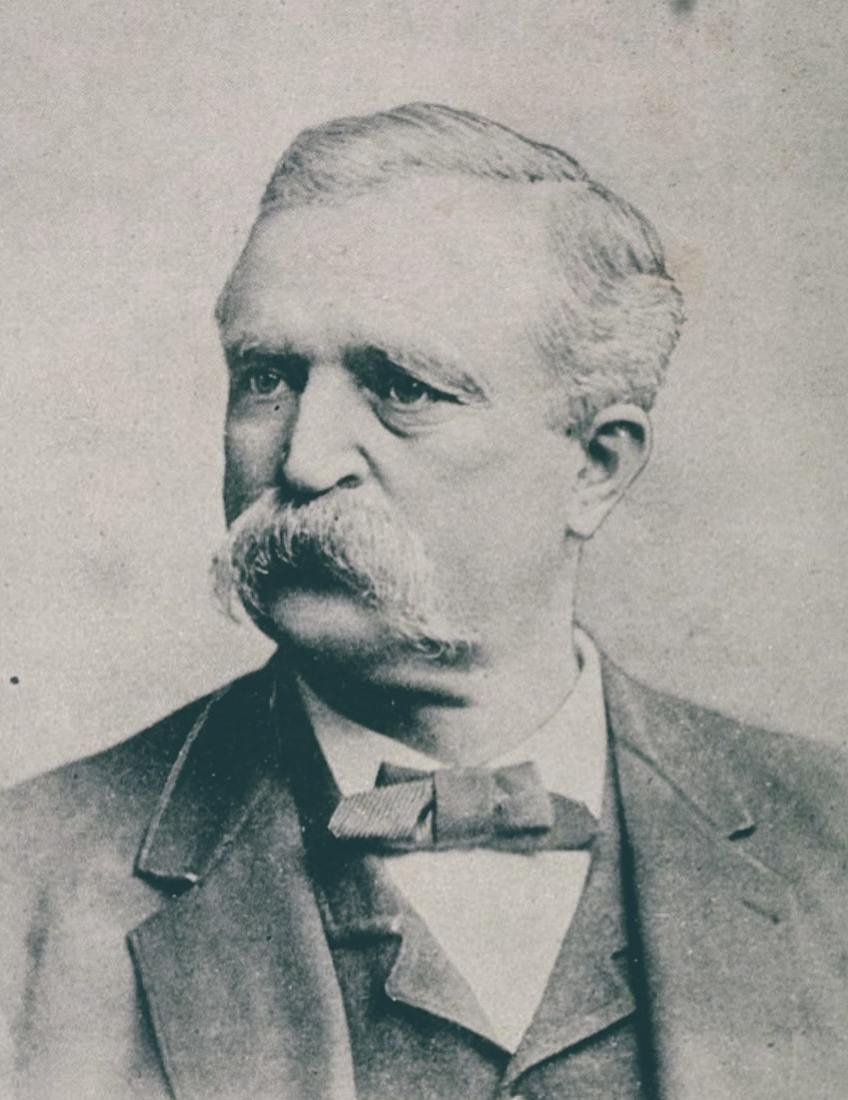
Nominee	Grover Cleveland	Benjamin Harrison	James B. Weaver
Party	Democratic	Republican	Populist
Home state	New York	Indiana	Iowa
Running mate	Adlai Stevenson I	Whitelaw Reid	James G. Field
Electoral vote	8	1	0
Popular vote	118,174	118,027	25,311
Percentage	43.83%	43.78%	9.39%
County results
Cleveland
40–50%
50–60%
Harrison
30–40%
40–50%
50–60%
70–80%
President before election
Benjamin Harrison
Republican
Elected President
Grover Cleveland
Democratic

The 1892 United States presidential election in California was held on November 8, 1892, as part of the 1892 United States presidential election. State voters chose nine representatives, or electors, to the Electoral College, who voted for president and vice president.

Incumbent President Benjamin Harrison’s administration had been plagued by divisions within his party and by controversy over foreign relations, notably with Italy and Chile. In California, Harrison became less popular because it was believed that Senator Leland Stanford was dictating policies in the interest of the Southern Pacific Railroad. Opposition to its power had already spawned several unsuccessful reform movements in California since 1873, and the growing Populist movement also gained substantial support from small farmers in the state's Central Valley region. The relative weakness of partisan loyalties in California helped give the movement much more influence than in the East, however the much greater urban character of the state's economy, the diversity of its agricultural sector and the access of its wheat growers – the basis for Populist victories in the Plains States – to major ocean ports severely weakened the Populist Party under 1880 Greenback nominee James B. Weaver in California. Consequently, California would prove Weaver's weakest state west of the Missouri River, giving him less than ten percent of the vote.

California voted for the Democratic challenger, former president Grover Cleveland, over the Republican incumbent, Benjamin Harrison by an extremely narrow margin of just 147 votes, or a 0.05452% margin, which constitutes the fifth-closest statewide presidential election result on record, behind Florida in 2000, Maryland in 1832 and 1904, and California itself 20 years later in 1912. Because the vote was so close and voters voted for individual electors, the ninth Cleveland elector received fewer votes than one Harrison elector, who was thus elected. This was the second occasion in which California's electoral vote was split, rather than being awarded to a single candidate. The first occasion was in 1880. Such a split would only subsequently occur in California two subsequent times (1896, and 1912). California is one of the three states that voted Republican in both 1884 and 1888 but flipped to Cleveland in 1892, the others being Illinois and Wisconsin.

== Results ==
General Election Results
Party	Pledged to	Elector	Votes
Democratic Party	Grover Cleveland	R. A. Long	118,174
Democratic Party	Grover Cleveland	J. A. Filcher	118,151
Democratic Party	Grover Cleveland	R. P. Hammond	118,112
Democratic Party	Grover Cleveland	William Graves	118,109
Democratic Party	Grover Cleveland	Jackson Hatch	118,096
Democratic Party	Grover Cleveland	J. D. Lynch	118,029
Republican Party	Benjamin Harrison	Thomas R. Bard	118,027
Democratic Party	Grover Cleveland	M. Rosenthal	118,008
Democratic Party	Grover Cleveland	W. L. Silman	117,962
Democratic Party	Grover Cleveland	J. F. Thompson	117,840
Republican Party	Benjamin Harrison	William Carson	117,747
Republican Party	Benjamin Harrison	J. C. Campbell	117,743
Republican Party	Benjamin Harrison	J. A. Waymire	117,717
Republican Party	Benjamin Harrison	H. V. Morehouse	117,711
Republican Party	Benjamin Harrison	M. L. Mery	117,670
Republican Party	Benjamin Harrison	Isaac Hecht	117,613
Republican Party	Benjamin Harrison	J. R. Willoughby	117,605
Republican Party	Benjamin Harrison	S. L. Hanscom	117,504
People's Party	James B. Weaver	S. Bowers	25,311
People's Party	James B. Weaver	A. L. Warner	25,256
People's Party	James B. Weaver	J. S. Dore	25,254
People's Party	James B. Weaver	J. N. Barton	25,243
People's Party	James B. Weaver	L. F. Moulton	25,237
People's Party	James B. Weaver	T. V. Cator	25,229
People's Party	James B. Weaver	William McCormick	25,217
People's Party	James B. Weaver	W. C. Bowman	25,201
People's Party	James B. Weaver	D. T. Fowler	25,176
Prohibition Party	John Bidwell	R. H. McDonald	8,096
Prohibition Party	John Bidwell	William P. Miller	8,029
Prohibition Party	John Bidwell	F. M. Porter	8,028
Prohibition Party	John Bidwell	A. McArthur	8,007
Prohibition Party	John Bidwell	F. E. Kellogg	7,995
Prohibition Party	John Bidwell	T. L. Hierlihy	7,991
Prohibition Party	John Bidwell	F. E. Caton	7,980
Prohibition Party	John Bidwell	H. H. Luse	7,972
Prohibition Party	John Bidwell	S. Fowler	7,921
Write-in		Scattering	1
Votes cast (Note: Based on totals for highest elector on each ticket)			269,609

=== Results by county ===
County	Grover Cleveland Democratic		Benjamin Harrison Republican		James B. Weaver People's		John Bidwell Prohibition		Scattering Write-in		Margin		Total votes cast (Note: Based on the highest elector on each ticket)
County	#	%	#	%	#	%	#	%	#	%	#	%	Total votes cast
Alameda	7,114	38.52%	8,792	47.60%	2,114	11.45%	450	2.44%	0	0.00%	-1,678	-9.09%	18,470
Alpine	17	19.77%	65	75.58%	4	4.65%	0	0.00%	0	0.00%	-48	-55.81%	86
Amador	1,255	48.01%	1,125	43.04%	164	6.27%	70	2.68%	0	0.00%	130	4.97%	2,614
Butte	2,141	45.89%	2,180	46.73%	183	3.92%	161	3.45%	0	0.00%	-39	-0.84%	4,665
Calaveras	1,276	46.79%	1,355	49.69%	75	2.75%	21	0.77%	0	0.00%	-79	-2.90%	2,727
Colusa	1,187	57.20%	645	31.08%	191	9.20%	52	2.51%	0	0.00%	542	26.12%	2,075
Contra Costa	1,332	42.30%	1,631	51.79%	121	3.84%	65	2.06%	0	0.00%	-299	-9.50%	3,149
Del Norte	339	52.72%	235	36.55%	59	9.18%	10	1.56%	0	0.00%	104	16.17%	643
El Dorado	1,270	48.00%	1,159	43.80%	174	6.58%	43	1.63%	0	0.00%	111	4.20%	2,646
Fresno	3,453	42.35%	3.031	37.18%	1,295	15.88%	374	4.59%	0	0.00%	422	5.18%	8,153
Glenn	808	51.70%	528	33.78%	183	11.71%	44	2.82%	0	0.00%	280	17.91%	1,563
Humboldt	1,844	33.98%	2,416	44.53%	1,036	19.09%	130	2.40%	0	0.00%	-572	-10.54%	5,426
Inyo	266	33.25%	409	51.13%	85	10.63%	40	5.00%	0	0.00%	-143	-17.88%	800
Kern	1,266	50.38%	992	39.47%	201	8.00%	54	2.15%	0	0.00%	274	10.90%	2,513
Lake	644	44.97%	532	37.15%	208	14.53%	48	3.35%	0	0.00%	112	7.82%	1,432
Lassen	524	46.66%	540	48.09%	40	3.56%	19	1.69%	0	0.00%	-16	-1.42%	1,123
Los Angeles	8,119	35.64%	10,226	44.89%	3,086	13.55%	1,348	5.92%	0	0.00%	-2,107	-9.25%	22,779
Marin	949	42.88%	1,186	53.59%	59	2.67%	19	0.86%	0	0.00%	-237	-10.71%	2,213
Mariposa	526	51.98%	404	39.92%	70	6.92%	12	1.19%	0	0.00%	122	12.06%	1,012
Mendocino	2,023	49.56%	1,709	41.87%	158	3.87%	192	4.70%	0	0.00%	314	7.69%	4,082
Merced	995	50.46%	782	39.66%	126	6.39%	69	3.50%	0	0.00%	213	10.80%	1,972
Modoc	596	52.05%	406	35.46%	106	9.26%	37	3.23%	0	0.00%	190	16.59%	1,145
Mono	166	30.97%	286	53.36%	77	14.37%	7	1.31%	0	0.00%	-120	-22.39%	536
Monterey	1,606	39.14%	1,709	41.65%	686	16.72%	102	2.49%	0	0.00%	-103	-2.51%	4,103
Napa	1,478	42.43%	1,769	50.79%	173	4.97%	63	1.81%	0	0.00%	-291	-8.35%	3,483
Nevada	1,634	39.84%	1,757	42.84%	616	15.02%	94	2.29%	0	0.00%	-123	-3.00%	4,101
Orange	1,000	34.49%	1,152	39.74%	480	16.56%	267	9.21%	0	0.00%	-152	-5.24%	2,899
Placer	1,524	43.08%	1,743	49.27%	185	5.23%	86	2.43%	0	0.00%	-219	-6.19%	3,538
Plumas	537	43.62%	642	52.15%	27	2.19%	25	2.03%	0	0.00%	-105	-8.53%	1,231
Sacramento	3,498	39.23%	4,362	48.92%	889	9.97%	168	1.88%	0	0.00%	-864	-9.69%	8,917
San Benito	759	45.56%	616	36.97%	256	15.37%	35	2.10%	0	0.00%	143	8.58%	1,666
San Bernardino	2,546	33.65%	3,686	48.71%	721	9.53%	614	8.11%	0	0.00%	-1,140	-15.07%	7,567
San Diego	2,334	30.26%	3,525	45.71%	1,519	19.70%	334	4.33%	0	0.00%	-1,191	-15.44%	7,712
San Francisco	31,022	53.09%	24,416	41.78%	2,508	4.29%	489	0.84%	0	0.00%	6,606	11.30%	58,435
San Joaquin	3,106	44.19%	2,958	42.08%	592	8.42%	373	5.31%	0	0.00%	148	2.11%	7,029
San Luis Obispo	1,199	31.88%	1,433	38.10%	997	26.51%	132	3.51%	0	0.00%	-234	-6.22%	3,761
San Mateo	1,020	47.40%	1,088	50.56%	32	1.49%	12	0.56%	0	0.00%	-68	-3.16%	2,152
Santa Barbara	1,228	34.88%	1,483	42.12%	639	18.15%	170	4.83%	1	0.03%	-255	-7.24%	3,521
Santa Clara	4,167	40.12%	4,620	44.48%	1,091	10.50%	509	4.90%	0	0.00%	-453	-4.36%	10,387
Santa Cruz	1,512	36.77%	1,843	44.82%	562	13.67%	195	4.74%	0	0.00%	-331	-8.05%	4,112
Shasta	1,137	39.41%	1,234	42.77%	436	15.11%	78	2.70%	0	0.00%	-97	-3.36%	2,885
Sierra	529	38.61%	787	57.45%	46	3.36%	8	0.58%	0	0.00%	-258	-18.83%	1,370
Siskiyou	1,605	49.74%	1,493	46.27%	109	3.38%	20	0.62%	0	0.00%	112	3.47%	3,227
Solano	2,174	44.52%	2,403	49.21%	213	4.36%	93	1.90%	0	0.00%	-229	-4.69%	4,883
Sonoma	3,451	49.65%	3,016	43.40%	297	4.27%	186	2.68%	0	0.00%	435	6.26%	6,950
Stanislaus	1,369	53.69%	992	38.90%	58	2.27%	131	5.14%	0	0.00%	377	14.78%	2,550
Sutter	735	46.64%	745	47.27%	45	2.86%	51	3.24%	0	0.00%	-10	-0.63%	1,576
Tehama	1,045	46.80%	969	43.39%	170	7.61%	49	2.19%	0	0.00%	76	3.40%	2,233
Trinity	457	46.92%	495	50.82%	19	1.95%	3	0.31%	0	0.00%	-38	-3.90%	974
Tulare	2,613	42.09%	1,984	31.96%	1,410	22.71%	201	3.24%	0	0.00%	629	10.13%	6,208
Tuolumne	916	50.27%	739	40.56%	113	6.20%	54	2.96%	0	0.00%	177	9.71%	1,822
Ventura	958	34.80%	1,283	46.60%	415	15.07%	97	3.52%	0	0.00%	-325	-11.81%	2,753
Yolo	1,707	50.74%	1,372	40.78%	135	4.01%	150	4.46%	0	0.00%	335	9.96%	3,364
Yuba	1,198	50.42%	1,079	45.41%	57	2.40%	42	1.77%	0	0.00%	119	5.01%	2,376
Total	118,174	43.83%	118,027	43.78%	25,311	9.39%	8,096	3.00%	1	0.00%	147	0.05%	269,609

==== Counties that flipped from Republican to Democratic ====
- San Joaquin

==== Counties that flipped from Democratic to Republican ====
- Butte
- Lassen
- Trinity

== See also ==
- United States presidential elections in California
