= 2000 United States presidential election in Florida =

- November 7, 2000
- Turnout: 70.1% (▲2.7 pp)

Nominee	George W. Bush	Al Gore
Party	Republican	Democratic
Home state	Texas	Tennessee
Running mate	Dick Cheney	Joe Lieberman
Electoral vote	25	0
Popular vote	2,912,790	2,912,253
Percentage	48.847%	48.838%

Bush
40–50%
50–60%
60–70%
70–80%
80–90%
90–100%
Gore
40–50%
50–60%
60–70%
70–80%
80–90%
90–100%
Tie/No Votes
President before election
Bill Clinton
Democratic
Elected President
George W. Bush
Republican

The 2000 United States presidential election in Florida took place on November 7, 2000, as part of the nationwide presidential election. Florida, a swing state, had a major recount dispute that took center stage in the election. The outcome of the 2000 United States presidential election was not known for more than a month after balloting because of the extended process of counting and recounting Florida's presidential ballots. State results tallied on election night gave 246 electoral votes to Republican nominee Texas Governor George W. Bush and 255 to Democratic nominee Vice President Al Gore, with New Mexico (5), Oregon (7), and Florida (25) too close to call that evening. Gore won New Mexico and Oregon over the following few days, but the result in Florida was decisive, regardless of how those two states had voted.

After an intense recount process and the United States Supreme Court's decision in Bush v. Gore, Bush won Florida's electoral votes by a margin of only 537 votes out of almost six million cast (0.009%) and, as a result, became the president-elect. The process was extremely divisive and led to calls for electoral reform in Florida. If Gore had been declared the winner, he would have won the election with a total of 292 electoral votes. Post-election analysis has found that Palm Beach County's butterfly ballot misdirected over 2,000 votes from Gore to third-party candidate Pat Buchanan, tipping Florida—and the election—to Bush.

The final official Florida count gave the victory to Bush by 537 votes, making it by percentage not only the closest state of the election (New Mexico was decided by 366 votes but has a much smaller population, representing a 0.061% margin), but also the closest of any state in any United States presidential election ever. (Note: The previous closest statewide presidential elections were two in Maryland, that in 1832 being decided by just four votes or 0.0104%, and that of 1904 by just fifty-one votes or 0.023%. Next, closest were two elections in California, that of 1912 being decided by 0.026% or 174 votes, and that of 1892 – which gave Grover Cleveland a second term as president – by 0.055% or 147 votes.) This was the closest margin in any tipping-point state in history, surpassing the record of the 1884 United States presidential election in New York.

As of the 2024 presidential election, this is the last election in which the Democratic candidate won Pasco County and Hernando County. It was also the first time the Democratic candidate won Orange County since Franklin D. Roosevelt in 1944. This county, along with Charles County, Maryland, were the only two Gore flipped from the previous election. Bush became the first Republican to win the White House without carrying Palm Beach County since the county's founding in 1909.

== General election ==
=== Campaign ===
Initially, Florida had been considered fertile territory for Republicans. It was governed by Jeb Bush, a staunch conservative and George W. Bush's brother. Nonetheless, Republicans put significant advertising resources into the state, and later polls indicated that the state was very much in play as late as September 2000. Some late momentum for Gore and his Jewish running mate Joe Lieberman may have come from southern Florida's significant Jewish population. Voters from reliably Democratic states in the Northeast had also been migrating to Florida since the 1950s. The state's electorate was becoming more diverse in general, with growing Asian and Hispanic immigrant populations.

Meanwhile, there was a heavy backlash in the Cuban-American population against Democrats during the Elian Gonzalez dispute, during which Janet Reno, President Bill Clinton's Attorney General, ordered the six-year-old Cuban refugee to be returned to Cuba. The Democrats' share of the Cuban-American vote dropped dramatically after 1996.

In late October, one poll found that Gore was leading Bush and third parties by 44–42–4 among registered voters and 46–42–4 among likely voters, but that poll had a margin of error of four percentage points, making the race too close to call.

On election day itself, the extent of the mix-ups in the electoral rolls was such that "in a number of precincts in Florida's inner cities, the polling locations were heavily fortified with police."

=== Polling ===
Poll source	Date(s)	Sample size	Margin of error	George W. Bush (R)	Al Gore (D)	Ralph Nader (G)	Other / undecided (Note: Calculated by taking the difference of 100% and all other listed candidates combined. For polls that do not report a figure for Nader, this includes his support.)
SurveyUSA	November 5, 2000	500	—	45%	50%	—	5%
Zogby Analytics	November 5, 2000	593	—	46%	48%	6%	0%
Harris Insights & Analytics	November 3, 2000	17,033	—	46%	49%	3%	2%
Zogby Analytics	November 2, 2000	600	—	45%	46%	5%	4%
Rasmussen Reports	November 1, 2000	577	—	47%	45%	—	8%
SurveyUSA	November 1, 2000	500	—	45%	50%	—	5%
American Research Group	October 31, 2000	600	—	44%	49%	2%	5%
Mason-Dixon Polling & Strategy	October 31, 2000	812	—	46%	44%	2%	8%
Zogby Analytics	October 30, 2000	600	—	41%	48%	5%	6%
Los Angeles Times	October 28, 2000	401	—	48%	44%	2%	6%
Zogby Analytics	October 27, 2000	600	—	42%	49%	3%	6%
Rasmussen Reports	October 25, 2000	864	—	46%	45%	—	9%
CBS News/The New York Times	October 23, 2000	514 (Note: Average of multiple versions or turnout models listed in the poll.)	—	45%	48.5%	3%	3.5%
American Research Group	October 22, 2000	600	—	45%	49%	2%	4%
Fleming & Associates	October 20, 2000	606	—	46%	41%	4%	9%
McLaughlin & Associates (R) (Note: Poll conducted for Bill McCollum.)	October 17, 2000	600	—	44%	43%	3%	10%

=== Results ===
2000 United States presidential election in Florida
Party	Candidate	Running mate	Votes	Percentage	Electoral votes
Republican	George W. Bush	Dick Cheney	2,912,790	48.847%	25
Democratic	Al Gore	Joe Lieberman	2,912,253	48.838%	0
Green	Ralph Nader	Winona LaDuke	97,488	1.64%	0
Reform	Patrick Buchanan	Ezola Foster	17,484	0.29%	0
Libertarian	Harry Browne	Art Olivier	16,415	0.28%	0
Natural Law	John Hagelin	Nat Goldhaber	2,281	0.04%	0
Workers World	Monica Moorehead	Gloria La Riva	1,804	0.03%	0
Constitution	Howard Phillips	Curtis Frazier	1,371	0.02%	0
Socialist	David McReynolds	Mary Cal Hollis	622	0.01%	0
Socialist Workers	James Harris	Margaret Trowe	562	0.01%	0
Write-in			36	<0.01%	—
Totals			5,963,110	100.00%	25

Florida was the second of the 50 states (after Louisiana) to report its official results to the federal government (in a Certificate of Ascertainment submitted to the National Archivist, the manner prescribed for presidential elections).

==== Results by county ====
County	George W. Bush Republican		Al Gore Democratic		Ralph Nader Green		Pat Buchanan Reform		Various candidates Other parties		Margin		Total
County	#	%	#	%	#	%	#	%	#	%	#	%	Total
Alachua	34,135	39.80%	47,380	55.25%	3,228	3.76%	263	0.31%	751	0.88%	-13,245	-15.45%	85,757
Baker	5,611	68.80%	2,392	29.33%	53	0.65%	73	0.90%	26	0.32%	3,219	39.47%	8,155
Bay	38,682	65.70%	18,873	32.06%	830	1.41%	248	0.42%	243	0.41%	19,809	33.64%	58,876
Bradford	5,416	62.43%	3,075	35.45%	84	0.97%	65	0.75%	35	0.40%	2,341	26.98%	8,675
Brevard	115,253	52.75%	97,341	44.55%	4,471	2.05%	571	0.26%	852	0.39%	17,912	8.20%	218,488
Broward	177,939	30.93%	387,760	67.41%	7,105	1.24%	795	0.14%	1,640	0.29%	-209,821	-36.48%	575,239
Calhoun	2,873	55.52%	2,156	41.66%	39	0.75%	90	1.74%	17	0.33%	717	13.86%	5,175
Charlotte	35,428	52.96%	29,646	44.31%	1,462	2.19%	182	0.27%	182	0.27%	5,782	8.65%	66,900
Citrus	29,801	52.06%	25,531	44.60%	1,383	2.42%	270	0.47%	263	0.46%	4,270	7.46%	57,248
Clay	41,903	72.80%	14,668	25.48%	565	0.98%	186	0.32%	237	0.41%	27,235	47.32%	57,559
Collier	60,467	65.58%	29,939	32.47%	1,405	1.52%	122	0.13%	269	0.29%	30,528	33.11%	92,202
Columbia	10,968	59.24%	7,049	38.07%	258	1.39%	89	0.48%	150	0.81%	3,919	21.17%	18,514
DeSoto	4,256	54.48%	3,321	42.51%	157	2.01%	36	0.46%	42	0.54%	935	11.97%	7,812
Dixie	2,697	57.79%	1,827	39.15%	75	1.61%	29	0.62%	39	0.84%	870	18.64%	4,667
Duval	152,460	57.49%	108,039	40.74%	2,762	1.04%	653	0.25%	1,267	0.48%	44,421	16.75%	265,181
Escambia	73,171	62.62%	40,990	35.08%	1,733	1.48%	502	0.43%	460	0.39%	32,181	27.54%	116,856
Flagler	12,618	46.53%	13,897	51.25%	435	1.60%	83	0.31%	83	0.31%	-1,279	-4.72%	27,116
Franklin	2,454	52.83%	2,047	44.07%	85	1.83%	33	0.71%	26	0.56%	407	8.76%	4,645
Gadsden	4,770	32.38%	9,736	66.09%	139	0.94%	38	0.26%	48	0.33%	-4,966	-33.71%	14,731
Gilchrist	3,300	61.17%	1,910	35.40%	97	1.80%	29	0.54%	59	1.09%	1,390	25.77%	5,395
Glades	1,841	54.71%	1,442	42.85%	56	1.66%	9	0.27%	17	0.51%	399	11.86%	3,365
Gulf	3,553	57.79%	2,398	39.00%	86	1.40%	71	1.15%	40	0.65%	1,155	18.79%	6,148
Hamilton	2,147	54.14%	1,723	43.44%	37	0.93%	23	0.58%	36	0.91%	424	10.70%	3,966
Hardee	3,765	60.38%	2,342	37.56%	75	1.20%	30	0.48%	24	0.38%	1,423	22.82%	6,236
Hendry	4,747	58.32%	3,240	39.81%	104	1.28%	22	0.27%	26	0.32%	1,507	18.51%	8,139
Hernando	30,658	47.00%	32,648	50.05%	1,501	2.30%	243	0.37%	186	0.29%	-1,990	-3.05%	65,236
Highlands	20,207	57.48%	14,169	40.31%	545	1.55%	127	0.36%	104	0.30%	6,038	17.17%	35,152
Hillsborough	180,794	50.17%	169,576	47.06%	7,496	2.08%	847	0.24%	1,641	0.46%	11,218	3.11%	360,354
Holmes	5,012	67.77%	2,177	29.43%	94	1.27%	76	1.03%	37	0.50%	2,835	38.34%	7,396
Indian River	28,639	57.71%	19,769	39.84%	950	1.91%	105	0.21%	164	0.33%	8,870	17.87%	49,627
Jackson	9,139	56.06%	6,870	42.14%	138	0.85%	102	0.63%	54	0.33%	2,269	13.92%	16,303
Jefferson	2,478	43.91%	3,041	53.89%	76	1.35%	29	0.51%	19	0.34%	-563	-9.98%	5,643
Lafayette	1,670	66.67%	789	31.50%	26	1.04%	10	0.40%	10	0.40%	881	35.17%	2,505
Lake	50,010	56.44%	36,571	41.27%	1,460	1.65%	289	0.33%	281	0.32%	13,439	15.17%	88,611
Lee	106,151	57.57%	73,571	39.90%	3,588	1.95%	305	0.17%	785	0.43%	32,580	17.67%	184,400
Leon	39,073	37.88%	61,444	59.57%	1,934	1.87%	282	0.27%	421	0.41%	-22,371	-21.69%	103,154
Levy	6,863	53.91%	5,398	42.40%	285	2.24%	67	0.53%	117	0.92%	1,465	11.51%	12,730
Liberty	1,317	54.65%	1,017	42.20%	19	0.79%	39	1.62%	18	0.75%	300	12.45%	2,410
Madison	3,038	49.29%	3,015	48.92%	54	0.88%	29	0.47%	27	0.44%	23	0.37%	6,163
Manatee	58,023	52.58%	49,226	44.61%	2,494	2.26%	271	0.25%	330	0.30%	8,797	7.97%	110,344
Marion	55,146	53.55%	44,674	43.39%	1,810	1.76%	563	0.55%	778	0.76%	10,472	10.16%	102,971
Martin	33,972	54.78%	26,621	42.93%	1,118	1.80%	112	0.18%	193	0.31%	7,351	11.85%	62,016
Miami-Dade	289,574	46.29%	328,867	52.57%	5,355	0.86%	560	0.09%	1,196	0.19%	-39,293	-6.28%	625,552
Monroe	16,063	47.39%	16,487	48.64%	1,090	3.22%	47	0.14%	208	0.61%	-424	-1.25%	33,895
Nassau	16,408	68.98%	6,955	29.24%	253	1.06%	90	0.38%	81	0.34%	9,453	39.74%	23,787
Okaloosa	52,186	73.69%	16,989	23.99%	988	1.40%	268	0.38%	388	0.55%	35,197	49.70%	70,819
Okeechobee	5,057	51.32%	4,589	46.57%	131	1.33%	43	0.44%	34	0.35%	468	4.75%	9,854
Orange	134,531	48.02%	140,236	50.06%	3,879	1.38%	446	0.16%	1,063	0.38%	-5,705	-2.04%	280,155
Osceola	26,237	47.11%	28,187	50.61%	733	1.32%	145	0.26%	388	0.70%	-1,950	-3.50%	55,690
Palm Beach	152,964	35.31%	269,754	62.27%	5,566	1.28%	3,411	0.79%	1,527	0.35%	-116,790	-26.96%	433,222
Pasco	68,607	48.05%	69,576	48.73%	3,394	2.38%	570	0.40%	622	0.44%	-969	-0.68%	142,769
Pinellas	184,849	46.38%	200,657	50.35%	10,023	2.52%	1,013	0.25%	1,984	0.50%	-15,808	-3.97%	398,526
Polk	90,310	53.56%	75,207	44.60%	2,059	1.22%	533	0.32%	520	0.31%	15,103	8.96%	168,629
Putnam	13,457	51.29%	12,107	46.14%	379	1.44%	148	0.56%	148	0.56%	1,350	5.15%	26,239
Santa Rosa	36,339	72.10%	12,818	25.43%	726	1.44%	311	0.62%	208	0.41%	23,521	46.67%	50,402
Sarasota	83,117	51.63%	72,869	45.27%	4,071	2.53%	305	0.19%	615	0.38%	10,248	6.36%	160,977
Seminole	75,790	55.00%	59,227	42.98%	1,949	1.41%	195	0.14%	644	0.47%	16,563	12.02%	137,805
St. Johns	39,564	65.10%	19,509	32.10%	1,217	2.00%	229	0.38%	252	0.41%	20,055	33.00%	60,771
St. Lucie	34,705	44.50%	41,560	53.29%	1,368	1.75%	124	0.16%	233	0.30%	-6,855	-8.79%	77,990
Sumter	12,127	54.48%	9,637	43.29%	306	1.37%	114	0.51%	77	0.35%	2,490	11.19%	22,261
Suwannee	8,009	64.27%	4,076	32.71%	180	1.44%	108	0.87%	88	0.71%	3,933	31.56%	12,461
Taylor	4,058	59.59%	2,649	38.90%	59	0.87%	27	0.40%	17	0.25%	1,409	20.69%	6,810
Union	2,332	60.95%	1,407	36.77%	33	0.86%	37	0.97%	17	0.44%	925	24.18%	3,826
Volusia	82,368	44.84%	97,313	52.98%	2,910	1.58%	498	0.27%	585	0.32%	-14,945	-8.14%	183,674
Wakulla	4,512	52.54%	3,838	44.70%	149	1.74%	46	0.54%	42	0.49%	674	7.84%	8,587
Walton	12,186	66.51%	5,643	30.80%	265	1.45%	120	0.65%	109	0.59%	6,543	35.71%	18,323
Washington	4,995	62.24%	2,798	34.86%	93	1.16%	88	1.10%	52	0.65%	2,197	27.38%	8,026
Totals	2,912,790	48.85%	2,912,253	48.84%	97,488	1.63%	17,484	0.29%	23,095	0.39%	537	0.01%	5,963,110

===== Counties that flipped from Democratic to Republican =====
- Calhoun (largest city: Blountstown)
- Citrus (largest city: Homosassa Springs)
- Dixie (largest city: Cross City)
- Franklin (largest city: Eastpoint)
- Gilchrist (largest city: Trenton)
- Glades (largest city: Moore Haven)
- Gulf (largest city: Port St. Joe)
- Hamilton (largest city: Jasper)
- Hendry (largest city: Clewiston)
- Hillsborough (largest city: Tampa)
- Levy (largest city: Williston)
- Madison (largest city: Madison)
- Okeechobee (largest city: Okeechobee)
- Putnam (largest city: Palatka)
- Sumter (largest city: The Villages)
- Taylor (largest city: Perry)
- Wakulla (largest city: Sopchoppy)

===== Counties that flipped from Republican to Democratic =====
- Orange (largest city: Orlando)

==== By congressional district ====
Bush won 13 of 23 congressional districts, including one that elected a Democrat. Gore won 10, including three that elected Republicans.

District	Bush	Gore	Representative
1st	68%	30%	Joe Scarborough
2nd	49%	48%	Allen Boyd
3rd	37%	62%	Corrine Brown
4th	63%	35%	Tillie K. Fowler
4th	63%	35%	Ander Crenshaw
5th	46%	50%	Karen Thurman
6th	58%	39%	Cliff Stearns
7th	50%	48%	John Mica
8th	53%	45%	Bill McCollum
8th	53%	45%	Ric Keller
9th	52%	45%	Michael Bilirakis
10th	44%	53%	Bill Young
11th	44%	53%	Jim Davis
12th	55%	43%	Charles Canady
12th	55%	43%	Adam Putnam
13th	52%	45%	Dan Miller
14th	59%	38%	Porter Goss
15th	53%	44%	Dave Weldon
16th	46%	52%	Mark Foley
17th	15%	84%	Carrie Meek
18th	61%	38%	Ileana Ros-Lehtinen
19th	30%	69%	Robert Wexler
20th	36%	63%	Peter Deutsch
21st	62%	37%	Lincoln Diaz-Balart
22nd	39%	58%	Clay Shaw
23rd	19%	79%	Alcee Hastings

== Analysis and aftermath ==
Election fairness was a major problem that had gained much attention in the 1990s; for example, the 1997 Miami mayoral election was tainted by scandal. According to The Palm Beach Post, "State lawmakers decided to weed out felons and other ineligible voters in 1998 after a Miami mayoral election was overturned because votes had been cast by the convicted and the dead."

This initiative occurred without sufficient protection of voting rights. In particular, from summer 1999 to spring 2000, Florida's voter list was subject to an unusually high number of problems. "The state's highest officials responsible for ensuring efficiency, uniformity, and fairness in the election failed to fulfill their responsibilities." The U.S. Commission on Civil Rights found that an "overall lack of leadership in protecting voting rights was largely responsible for the broad array of problems in Florida during the 2000 election."

Michael Moore in his 2001 book Stupid White Men described allegations of efforts to deny black citizens in Florida the right to vote. As a result of the state's contract with Database Technologies, "173,000 registered voters in Florida were permanently wiped off the voter rolls" and after an elections supervisor in Madison County was barred from voting; she and others "tried to get the state to rectify the problem, but their pleas fell on deaf ears."

=== Recount ===
The presidential election in Florida was closely scrutinized after Election Day. Due to the narrow margin of the original vote count, Florida Election Code 102.141 mandated a statewide machine recount, which began the day after the election. It was ostensibly completed on November 10 in the 66 Florida counties that used vote-counting machines and reduced Bush's lead to 327 votes. According to legal analyst Jeffrey Toobin, later analysis showed that a total of 18 counties—accounting for a quarter of all votes cast in Florida—did not carry out the legally mandated machine recount, but "No one from the Gore campaign ever challenged this view" that the machine recount had been completed. Once the closeness of the election in Florida was clear, both the Bush and Gore campaigns organized themselves for the ensuing legal process. On November 9, the Bush campaign announced they had hired George H. W. Bush's former Secretary of State James Baker and Republican political consultant Roger Stone to oversee their legal team, and the Gore campaign hired Bill Clinton's former Secretary of State Warren Christopher.

=== Westgate controversy ===
In 2012, David Siegel, the owner of the Florida-based Westgate Resorts hotel corporation, admitted to surveying his 8,000 Westgate employees, including many in Florida itself, and taking steps to make voting in the election easier for those who favored Bush and harder for those who favored Gore, which may have provided the number of votes needed for Bush, who only won the state by 537 votes, to secure the win in Florida.

Siegel said in an interview:

"Whenever I saw a negative article about Gore, I put it in with the paychecks of my 8,000 employees. I had my managers do a survey on every employee. If they liked Bush, we made them register to vote. But not if they liked Gore. The week before [the election] we made 80,000 phone calls through my call center—they were robo-calls. On Election Day, we made sure everyone who was voting for Bush got to the polls. I didn't know he would win by 527 votes. Afterward, we did a survey among the employees to find out who voted who wouldn't have otherwise. One thousand of them said so."

Shortly before admitting this, Siegel acknowledged beforehand that his role in Bush's 2000 election victory "may not necessarily have been legal."

=== Film ===
- Fahrenheit 9/11
- Recount is a made-for-TV political drama about the 2000 US presidential election. The show was written by Danny Strong, directed by Jay Roach, and produced by Kevin Spacey (who also stars in the film). It premiered on HBO on May 25, 2008, and the DVD was released on August 19, 2008.
- Orwell Rolls in His Grave

== Electors ==
The electoral college during the certification of the 2000 election in Florida

Technically, the voters of Florida cast their ballots for electors, representatives to the Electoral College. In 2000, Florida was allocated 25 electors because it had 23 congressional districts and 2 senators. All candidates who appear on the ballot or qualify to receive write-in votes must submit a list of 25 electors who pledge to vote for their candidate and their running mate. Whoever wins the most votes in the state is awarded all 25 electoral votes. Their chosen electors then vote for president and vice president. Although electors are pledged to their candidate and running mate, they are not obligated to vote for them. An elector who votes for someone other than their candidate is known as a faithless elector.

The electors of each state and the District of Columbia met on December 18, 2000, to cast their votes for president and vice president. The Electoral College itself never meets as one body. Instead, the electors from each state and the District of Columbia met in their respective capitols.

The following were the members of the Electoral College from the state. All were pledged to and voted for George W. Bush and Richard B. Cheney:

1. Alred S. Austin
2. Deborah L. Brooks
3. Armando Codina
4. Maria De La Milera
5. Sandra M. Faulkner
6. Thomas C. Feeney III
7. Feliciano M. Foyo
8. Jeanne Barber Godwin
9. Dawn Guzzetta
10. Cynthia M. Handley
11. Adam W. Herbert
12. Al Hoffman
13. Glenda E. Hood
14. Carole Jean Jordan
15. Charles W. Kane
16. Mel Martinez
17. John M. McKay
18. Dorsey C. Miller
19. Berta J. Moralejo
20. H. Gary Morse
21. Marsha Nippert
22. Darryl K. Sharpton
23. Tom Slade
24. John Thrasher
25. Robert L. Woody

== Bibliography ==
- Ceaser, James W.; Busch, Andrew (2001). The Perfect Tie: The True Story of the 2000 Presidential Election. Lanham, Maryland: Rowman & Littlefield. ISBN 0-7425-0836-6. "perfect tie."
- Keating, Dan and Balz, Dan. 'Florida Recounts Would Have Favored Bush But Study Finds Gore Might Have Won Statewide Tally of All Uncounted Ballots.' The Washington Post, published Nov. 12, 2001.
- See also Category: Books about the 2000 United States presidential election
