= 1896 United States presidential election in California =

- November 3, 1896

Nominee	William McKinley	William Jennings Bryan
Party	Republican	Democratic
Alliance		Populist
Home state	Ohio	Nebraska
Running mate	Garret Hobart	Arthur Sewall
Electoral vote	8	1
Popular vote	146,688	144,766
Percentage	49.16%	48.51%
County results
McKinley
40–50%
50–60%
60–70%
Bryan
40–50%
50–60%
60–70%
Tie
40–50%
President before election
Grover Cleveland
Democratic
Elected President
William McKinley
Republican

The 1896 United States presidential election in California took place on November 3, 1896, as part of the 1896 United States presidential election. State voters chose nine representatives, or electors, to the Electoral College, who voted for president and vice president.

California narrowly voted for the Republican nominee, Ohio Governor William McKinley, over the Democratic nominee, former Nebraska representative William Jennings Bryan. McKinley won the state by a narrow margin of 0.65%.

Eight of the state's electoral votes were awarded to McKinley, while one was awarded to Bryan. This was the third occasion in which California's electoral vote was split, rather than being awarded to a single candidate. The previous two occasions were in 1880 and 1892. Such a split would only subsequently occur in California one more time (in 1912).

Bryan would lose California to McKinley again four years later and would later lose the state again in 1908 to William Howard Taft.

== Results ==
General Election Results
Party	Pledged to	Elector	Votes
Republican Party	William McKinley	Duncan E. McKinley	146,688
Republican Party	William McKinley	Irving M. Scott	146,133
Republican Party	William McKinley	Claus Spreckels	145,886
Republican Party	William McKinley	Howell A. Powell	145,812
Republican Party	William McKinley	Julius M. Walling	145,631
Republican Party	William McKinley	George M. Francis	145,590
Republican Party	William McKinley	Joseph S. Spear Jr.	145,587
Republican Party	William McKinley	Elwood Cooper	145,474
Democratic Party & People's Party	William Jennings Bryan	J. W. Martin	144,766 (Note: 123,143 on the Democratic ticket and 21,623 on the Populist ticket)
Republican Party	William McKinley	Thomas Flint	144,618
Democratic Party & People's Party	William Jennings Bryan	J. V. Webster	144,185 (Note: 122,451 on the Democratic ticket and 21,734 on the Populist ticket)
Democratic Party & People's Party	William Jennings Bryan	William Craig	144,113 (Note: 122,507 on the Democratic ticket and 21,606 on the Populist ticket)
Democratic Party & People's Party	William Jennings Bryan	Jo Hamilton	143,959 (Note: 122,333 on the Democratic ticket and 21,626 on the Populist ticket)
Democratic Party & People's Party	William Jennings Bryan	D. T. Fowler	143,913 (Note: 122,330 on the Democratic ticket and 21,583 on the Populist ticket)
Democratic Party & People's Party	William Jennings Bryan	S. I. Allard	143,874 (Note: 122,289 on the Democratic ticket and 21,585 on the Populist ticket)
Democratic Party & People's Party	William Jennings Bryan	M. R. Merritt	143,725 (Note: 122,208 on the Democratic ticket and 21,517 on the Populist ticket)
Democratic Party & People's Party	William Jennings Bryan	C. W. Thresher	143,664 (Note: 122,245 on the Democratic ticket and 21,419 on the Populist ticket)
Democratic Party & People's Party	William Jennings Bryan	Daniel McKay	143,024 (Note: 121,457 on the Democratic ticket and 21,567 on the Populist ticket)
Prohibition Party	Joshua Levering	W. R. Goodwin	2,573
Prohibition Party	Joshua Levering	B. F. Taylor	2,562
Prohibition Party	Joshua Levering	Stephen Bowers	2,500
Prohibition Party	Joshua Levering	Elam Biggs	2,491
Prohibition Party	Joshua Levering	Dr. P. McCargar	2,481
Prohibition Party	Joshua Levering	Robert Thompson	2,480
Prohibition Party	Joshua Levering	M. J. Hall	2,446
Prohibition Party	Joshua Levering	R. H. Young	2,445
Prohibition Party	Joshua Levering	H. H. Luse	2,444
National Democratic Party	John M. Palmer	James K. O'Brien	2,006
National Democratic Party	John M. Palmer	Clay W. Taylor	1,730
Socialist Labor Party	Charles H. Matchett	Emil Liess	1,611
Socialist Labor Party	Charles H. Matchett	Lemuel D. Biddle	1,564
National Democratic Party	John M. Palmer	John Rosenfeld	1,563
National Democratic Party	John M. Palmer	Thomas B. Bond	1,532
National Democratic Party	John M. Palmer	Jeremiah Lynch	1,529
National Democratic Party	John M. Palmer	Charles Anderson	1,510
National Democratic Party	John M. Palmer	John Roth	1,476
National Democratic Party	John M. Palmer	Robert Y. Hayne	1,472
National Democratic Party	John M. Palmer	L. B. Hakes	1,411
National Party	Charles E. Bentley	John Bidwell	1,047
National Party	Charles E. Bentley	William Kelly	947
National Party	Charles E. Bentley	Henry French	931
National Party	Charles E. Bentley	R. F. Burns	922
National Party	Charles E. Bentley	F. W. Hooper	896
National Party	Charles E. Bentley	J. M. Glass	890
National Party	Charles E. Bentley	W. H. Bone	860
National Party	Charles E. Bentley	F. Hilton	855
National Party	Charles E. Bentley	Jesse Yarnell	834
Write-in		Scattering	4
Votes cast (Note: Based on totals for highest elector on each ticket)			298,419

=== Results by county ===
County	William McKinley Republican		William Jennings Bryan Democratic & People's		Joshua Levering Prohibition		John M. Palmer National Democratic		Charles H. Matchett Socialist Labor		Charles Eugene Bentley National		Scattering Write-in		Margin		Total votes cast (Note: Based on the highest elector on each ticket)
County	#	%	#	%	#	%	#	%	#	%	#	%	#	%	#	%	Total votes cast
Alameda	13,429	60.43%	8,394	37.77%	132	0.59%	111	0.50%	101	0.45%	56	0.25%	0	0.00%	5,035	22.66%	22,223
Alpine	40	49.38%	39	48.15%	1	1.23%	1	1.23%	0	0.00%	0	0.00%	0	0.00%	1	1.23%	81
Amador	1,144	44.39%	1,398	54.25%	20	0.78%	4	0.16%	2	0.08%	9	0.35%	0	0.00%	-254	-9.86%	2,577
Butte	2,075	48.31%	2,120	49.36%	20	0.47%	42	0.98%	6	0.14%	32	0.75%	0	0.00%	-45	-1.05%	4,295
Calaveras	1,541	49.92%	1,518	49.17%	5	0.16%	11	0.36%	7	0.23%	5	0.16%	0	0.00%	23	0.75%	3,087
Colusa	581	30.86%	1,250	66.38%	10	0.53%	31	1.65%	9	0.48%	2	0.11%	0	0.00%	-689	-35.53%	1,883
Contra Costa	1,834	56.10%	1,381	42.25%	14	0.43%	15	0.46%	4	0.12%	21	0.64%	0	0.00%	453	13.86%	3,269
Del Norte	345	49.50%	334	47.92%	7	1.00%	9	1.29%	2	0.29%	0	0.00%	0	0.00%	11	1.58%	697
El Dorado	1,130	39.54%	1,674	58.57%	16	0.56%	14	0.49%	7	0.24%	17	0.59%	0	0.00%	-544	-19.03%	2,858
Fresno	2,686	40.22%	3,790	56.75%	85	1.27%	47	0.70%	39	0.58%	12	0.48%	0	0.00%	-1,104	-16.53%	6,679
Glenn	479	36.54%	825	62.93%	1	0.08%	2	0.15%	2	0.15%	2	0.15%	0	0.00%	-346	-26.39%	1,311
Humboldt	3,142	55.37%	2,465	43.44%	32	0.56%	19	0.33%	8	0.14%	9	0.16%	0	0.00%	677	11.93%	5,675
Inyo	286	34.01%	532	63.26%	10	1.19%	6	0.71%	2	0.24%	5	0.59%	0	0.00%	-246	-29.25%	841
Kern	1,430	43.80%	1,763	54.00%	28	0.86%	26	0.80%	12	0.37%	6	0.18%	0	0.00%	-333	-10.20%	3,265
Kings	673	43.06%	862	55.15%	13	0.83%	6	0.38%	2	0.13%	6	0.38%	1	0.06%	-189	-12.09%	1,563
Lake	546	38.00%	854	59.43%	20	1.39%	10	0.70%	0	0.14%	5	0.35%	0	0.00%	-308	-21.43%	1,437
Lassen	420	43.66%	528	54.89%	3	0.31%	5	0.52%	3	0.31%	3	0.31%	0	0.00%	-108	-11.23%	962
Los Angeles	16,891	49.62%	16,043	47.13%	787	2.31%	131	0.38%	108	0.32%	82	0.24%	0	0.00%	848	2.49%	34,042
Madera	452	37.32%	739	61.02%	13	1.07%	4	0.33%	1	0.08%	2	0.17%	0	0.00%	-287	-23.70%	1,211
Marin	1,448	61.41%	874	37.07%	3	0.13%	7	0.30%	21	0.89%	5	0.21%	0	0.00%	574	24.34%	2,358
Mariposa	563	39.68%	829	58.42%	7	0.49%	18	1.27%	0	0.00%	2	0.14%	0	0.00%	-266	-18.75%	1,419
Mendocino	2,093	48.92%	2,120	49.56%	24	0.56%	28	0.65%	3	0.07%	10	0.23%	0	0.00%	-27	-0.63%	4,278
Merced	653	36.24%	1,117	61.99%	15	0.83%	5	0.28%	4	0.22%	8	0.44%	0	0.00%	-464	-25.75%	1,802
Modoc	300	33.00%	588	64.69%	9	0.99%	7	0.77%	4	0.44%	1	0.11%	0	0.00%	-288	-31.68%	909
Mono	259	44.27%	315	53.85%	1	0.17%	8	1.37%	1	0.17%	1	0.17%	0	0.00%	-56	-9.57%	585
Monterey	1,878	45.82%	2,149	52.43%	21	0.51%	20	0.49%	11	0.27%	20	0.49%	0	0.00%	-271	-6.61%	4,099
Napa	2,032	57.03%	1,472	41.31%	23	0.65%	18	0.51%	8	0.22%	9	0.25%	1	0.03%	560	15.72%	3,563
Nevada	1,985	44.76%	2,360	53.21%	32	0.72%	26	0.59%	10	0.23%	22	0.50%	0	0.00%	-375	-8.46%	4,435
Orange	1,932	51.06%	1,712	45.24%	99	2.62%	24	0.63%	2	0.05%	15	0.40%	0	0.00%	220	5.81%	3,784
Placer	1,890	51.41%	1,721	46.82%	8	0.22%	14	0.38%	9	0.24%	34	0.92%	0	0.00%	169	4.60%	3,676
Plumas	678	53.47%	575	45.35%	7	0.55%	6	0.47%	0	0.00%	2	0.16%	0	0.00%	103	8.12%	1,268
Riverside	2,063	53.06%	1,684	43.31%	112	2.88%	18	0.46%	4	0.10%	7	0.18%	0	0.00%	379	9.75%	3,888
Sacramento	4,600	47.68%	4,831	50.07%	49	0.51%	71	0.74%	58	0.60%	39	0.40%	0	0.00%	-231	-2.39%	9,648
San Benito	729	42.48%	956	55.71%	7	0.41%	8	0.47%	6	0.35%	10	0.58%	0	0.00%	-227	-13.23%	1,716
San Bernardino	2,818	48.54%	2,740	47.20%	188	3.24%	26	0.45%	12	0.21%	21	0.36%	0	0.00%	78	1.34%	5,805
San Diego	3,631	46.86%	3,908	50.44%	96	1.24%	23	0.30%	71	0.92%	19	0.25%	0	0.00%	-277	-3.58%	7,748
San Francisco	31,041	49.20%	30,649	48.58%	109	0.17%	320	0.51%	784	1.24%	183	0.29%	0	0.00%	392	0.62%	63,086
San Joaquin	3,500	48.83%	3,500	48.83%	54	0.75%	46	0.64%	31	0.43%	36	0.50%	0	0.00%	0	0.00%	7,167
San Luis Obispo	1,671	43.74%	2,056	53.82%	39	1.02%	22	0.58%	8	0.21%	24	0.63%	0	0.00%	-385	10.08%	3,820
San Mateo	1,607	61.10%	987	37.53%	14	0.53%	12	0.46%	8	0.30%	2	0.08%	0	0.00%	620	23.57%	2,630
Santa Barbara	2,004	49.48%	1,916	47.31%	60	1.48%	41	1.01%	20	0.49%	9	0.22%	0	0.00%	88	2.17%	4,050
Santa Clara	6,315	53.51%	5,191	43.99%	68	0.58%	41	0.35%	82	0.69%	104	0.88%	0	0.00%	1,124	9.52%	11,801
Santa Cruz	1,969	48.24%	1,960	48.02%	46	1.13%	56	1.37%	23	0.56%	28	0.69%	0	0.00%	9	0.22%	4,082
Shasta	1,210	37.55%	1,936	60.09%	20	0.62%	38	1.18%	9	0.28%	9	0.28%	0	0.00%	-726	-22.53%	3,222
Sierra	707	56.61%	527	42.19%	6	0.48%	6	0.48%	0	0.00%	3	0.24%	0	0.00%	180	14.41%	1,249
Siskiyou	1,473	44.98%	1,724	52.64%	7	0.21%	37	1.13%	6	0.18%	26	0.79%	2	0.06%	-251	-7.66%	3,275
Solano	2,702	53.19%	2,284	44.96%	27	0.53%	44	0.87%	10	0.20%	13	0.26%	0	0.00%	418	8.23%	5,080
Sonoma	4,053	51.86%	3,595	46.00%	28	0.36%	84	1.07%	31	0.40%	25	0.32%	0	0.00%	458	5.86%	7,816
Stanislaus	1,007	40.92%	1,398	56.81%	14	0.57%	22	0.89%	1	0.04%	19	0.77%	0	0.00%	-391	-15.89%	2,461
Sutter	796	51.89%	713	46.48%	12	0.78%	11	0.72%	0	0.00%	2	0.13%	0	0.00%	83	5.41%	1,534
Tehama	969	45.39%	1,135	53.16%	11	0.52%	8	0.37%	2	0.09%	10	0.47%	0	0.00%	-166	-7.78%	2,135
Trinity	502	46.44%	545	50.42%	4	0.37%	26	2.41%	2	0.19%	2	0.19%	0	0.00%	-43	-3.98%	1,081
Tulare	1,410	33.80%	2,673	64.07%	35	0.84%	10	0.24%	31	0.74%	13	0.31%	0	0.00%	-1,263	-30.27%	4,172
Tuolumne	834	38.06%	1,308	59.70%	24	1.10%	16	0.73%	5	0.23%	4	0.18%	0	0.00%	-474	-21.63%	2,191
Ventura	1,533	50.41%	1,465	47.55%	35	1.14%	14	0.45%	9	0.29%	5	0.16%	0	0.00%	88	2.86%	3,081
Yolo	1,485	44.84%	1,753	52.93%	32	0.97%	33	1.00%	4	0.12%	5	0.15%	0	0.00%	-268	-8.09%	3,312
Yuba	1,204	53.82%	991	44.30%	10	0.45%	22	0.98%	4	0.18%	6	0.27%	0	0.00%	213	9.52%	2,237
Total	146,688	49.16%	144,766	48.51%	2,573	0.86%	1,730	0.58%	1,611	0.54%	1,047	0.35%	4	0.00%	1,922	0.64%	298,419

==== Counties that flipped from Republican to Democratic ====
- Butte
- Inyo
- Lassen
- Mono
- Monterey
- Nevada
- Sacramento
- San Diego
- San Luis Obispo
- Shasta
- Trinity

==== Counties that flipped from Democratic to Republican ====
- Del Norte
- San Francisco
- San Joaquin (became tied)
- Sonoma
- Yuba

== See also ==
- United States presidential elections in California
