= David C. Broderick =

American politician (1820–1859)

David Broderick
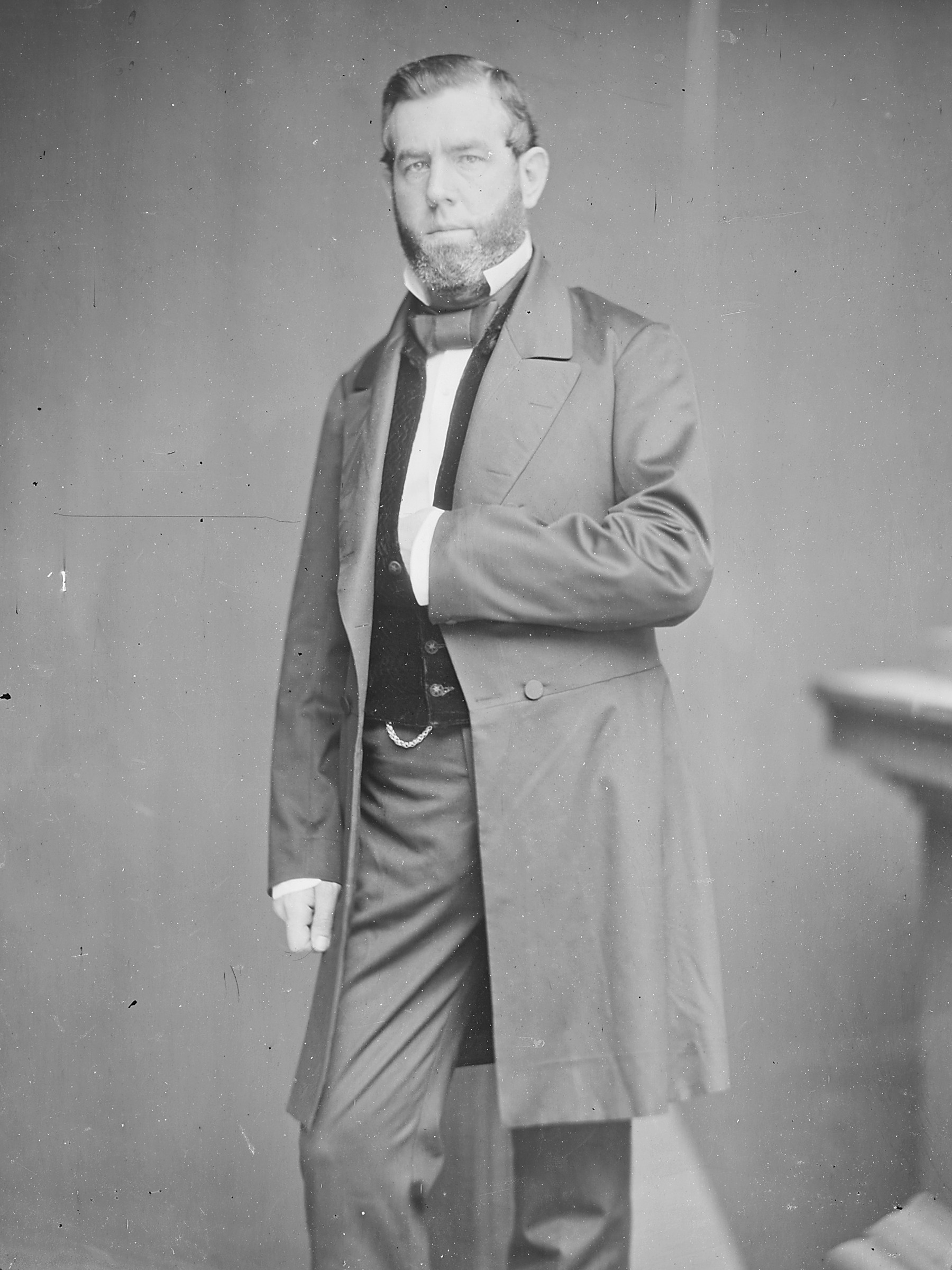
- Portrait by Brady c. 1857–1859

United States Senator from California
- In office March 4, 1857 – September 16, 1859
- Preceded by: John B. Weller
- Succeeded by: Henry P. Haun

2nd Lieutenant Governor of California
- Acting; January 9, 1851 – January 8, 1852
- Governor: John McDougall
- Preceded by: John McDougall
- Succeeded by: Samuel Purdy

Member of the California Senate
- In office January 8, 1850 – January 5, 1852
- Preceded by: Multi-member district
- Succeeded by: Multi-member district
- Constituency: San Francisco district (1850–1851); 6th district (1851–1852)

Personal details
- Born: David Colbreth Broderick; February 4, 1820 Washington, D.C., U.S.
- Died: September 16, 1859 (aged 39) San Francisco, California, U.S.
- Cause of death: Homicide by duel
- Party: Democratic
- Other political affiliations: Whig (1850); Free Soil (1850s)

David Colbreth Broderick (February 4, 1820 – September 16, 1859) was an attorney and politician, elected by the legislature as Democratic U.S. Senator from California. He lived in New York until moving to California during the Gold Rush. He was a first cousin of politicians Andrew Kennedy of Indiana and Case Broderick of Kansas. At age 39, Broderick was fatally wounded in a duel with jurist David S. Terry, a former friend.

== Early years ==
Broderick was born in 1820 in Washington, D.C., on East Capitol Street just west of 3rd Street. He was the son of an Irish stonecutter and his wife. His father had come to the United States in order to work on the construction of the United States Capitol. In 1823, Broderick moved with his parents to New York City; there, he attended public schools and was apprenticed to a stonecutter.

== Political career ==
Broderick became active in politics as a young man, joining the Democratic Party. In 1846, he was the Democratic candidate for U.S. Representative from New York's 5th congressional district, but lost the election to Whig candidate Frederick A. Tallmadge, who gained 42% of the vote to Broderick's 38%.

== State Senate career ==
Broderick was a member of the California State Senate from 1850 to 1852, serving as its president from 1851 to 1852. Broderick was acting Lieutenant Governor from January 9, 1851, to January 8, 1852, following incumbent John McDougall's succession to the governorship. From then on, Broderick effectively had political control of San Francisco, which under his "utterly vicious" rule soon became notorious for municipal corruption. In the words of his biographer Jeremiah Lynch:

In San Francisco he became the dictator of the municipality. His political lessons and observations in New York were priceless. He introduced a modification of the same organization in San Francisco with which Tammany has controlled New York for lo! these many years. It was briefly this. At a forthcoming election a number of offices were to be filled; those of sheriff, district attorney, alderman, and places in the legislature. Several of these positions were very lucrative, notably that of the sheriff, tax-collector, and assessor. The incumbents received no specified salaries, but were entitled to all or a certain proportion of the fees. These fees occasionally exceeded $50,000 per annum. Broderick would say to the most popular or the most desirable aspirant: "This office is worth $50,000 a year. Keep half and give me the other half, which I require to keep up our organization in the state. Without intelligent, systematic discipline, neither you nor I can win, and our opponents will conquer, unless I have money enough to pay the men whom I may find necessary. If you agree to that arrangement, I will have you nominated when the convention assembles, and then we will all pull together until after the election." Possibly this candidate dissented, but then someone else consented, and as the town was hugely Democratic, his selections were usually victorious.

Broderick became rich from this system.

In 1857, Broderick was elected by the state legislature as U.S. Senator from California (popular election of senators did not start until the 20th century). Broderick began his term on March 4, 1857.

== Feud and death ==
Broderick-Terry Dueling Place
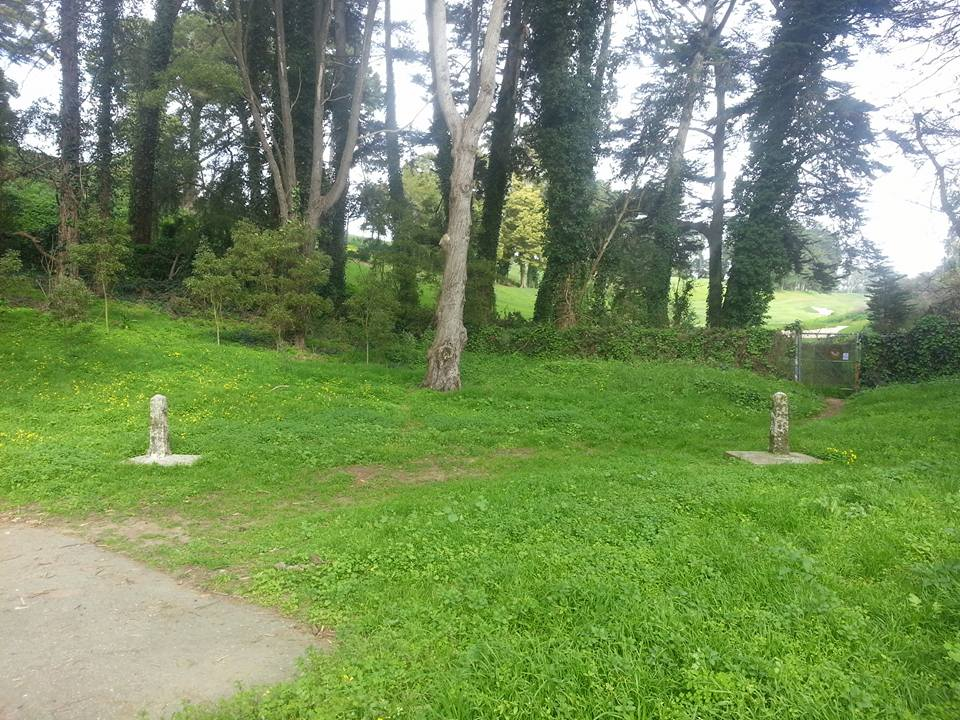
- Broderick-Terry Dueling Place

- Location within California Location within the United States
- 37.7081°N 122.4842°W
- Location: 1100 Lake Merced Boulevard, Daly City, California

History
- Built: 1859

Site notes
- Architect(s): David S. Terry and Broderick

California Historical Landmark
- Designated: June 1, 1932
- Reference no.: 19

At that time, just prior to the start of the American Civil War, the Democratic Party of California was divided between pro-slavery and "Free Soil" factions. Broderick led the Free Soilers. One of his closest friends was David S. Terry, formerly the Chief Justice of the California State Supreme Court. He advocated extending slavery into California. Terry lost his re-election bid because of his pro-slavery platform, and he blamed Broderick for the loss.

Terry, considered even by his friends as caustic and aggressive, made some inflammatory remarks at a party convention in Sacramento, which Broderick read. He took offense, and sent Terry an equally vitriolic reply, describing:

Terry to be a "damned miserable wretch" who was as corrupt as President James Buchanan and William Gwin, California's other senator. "I have hitherto spoken of him as an honest man—as the only honest man on the bench of a miserable, corrupt Supreme Court—but now I find I was mistaken. I take it all back. He is just as bad as the others."

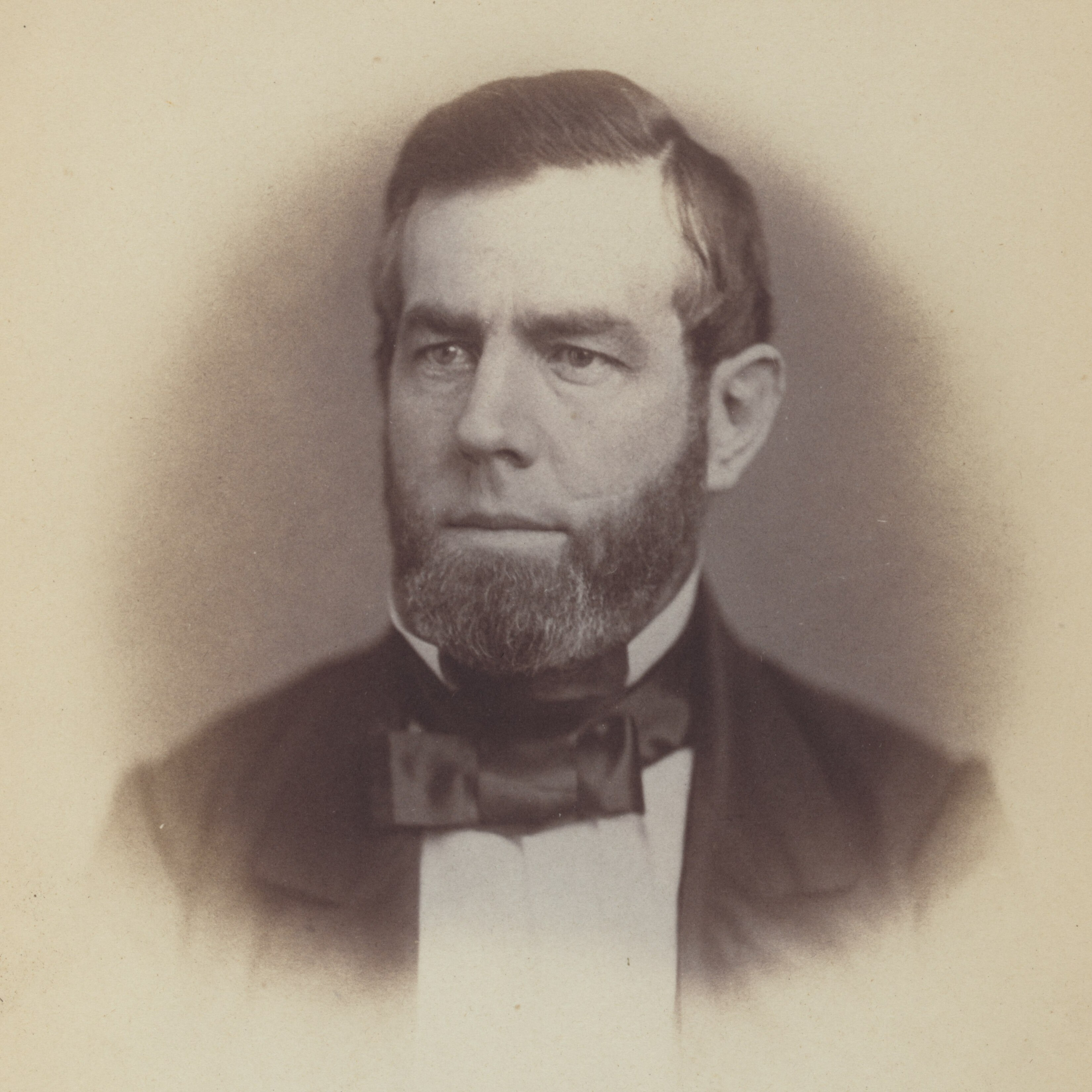
Photograph of Broderick by Julian Vannerson, 1859

Passions escalated; on September 13, 1859, former friends Terry and Broderick, both expert marksmen, met outside of San Francisco city limits at Lake Merced for a duel. The pistols chosen for the duel had hair triggers, and Broderick's discharged prior to the final "1-2-3" count, firing prematurely into the ground. Thus disarmed, he was forced to stand as Terry shot him in the right lung. Terry at first believed the shot to be only a flesh wound, but it proved to be fatal. Broderick died three days later, and was buried under a monument erected by the state in Lone Mountain Cemetery in San Francisco. He is the only U.S. Senator ever to be killed in a duel while in office.

In 1942, he was reinterred at Cypress Lawn Memorial Park in Colma, California.

== Legacy ==
George Wilkes wrote a long eulogy to his friend that appeared in the Wilkes's Spirit of the Times in October 1859.

Edward Dickinson Baker, a close friend of Abraham Lincoln, spoke at Broderick's funeral. He expressed the widely held belief that Broderick was killed because of his anti-slavery stance:

His death was a political necessity, poorly veiled beneath the guise of a private quarrel. . .What was his public crime? The answer is in his own words; "I die because I was opposed to a corrupt administration and the extension of slavery."

Some maintain that in his death Broderick became a martyr to the anti-slavery cause, and the episode was part of a national spiral towards civil war. At the Republican National Convention in Chicago in May 1860, a portrait of the late Senator Broderick was hung. In 1864 another portrait would be hung from the flagstaff of the Hibernian Lincoln and Johnson Club in San Francisco.

About thirty years later, Terry was shot to death by Deputy United States Marshal David Neagle while threatening Supreme Court Justice Stephen Johnson Field, a friend of Broderick.

Broderick County, Kansas Territory was named for the senator. The former town of Broderick, California, and Broderick Street in San Francisco were also named in his honor.

In 1963, Carroll O'Connor was cast as Broderick, with Brad Dexter as Justice Terry, in "A Gun Is Not a Gentleman" on the syndicated television anthology series, Death Valley Days, hosted by Stanley Andrews. The program portrays Terry mortally wounding Senator Broderick in 1859. Though past allies as Democrats, Terry, a defender of slavery, challenges the anti-slavery Broderick to a duel. After he fatally shoots Broderick, Terry is tried, but the case is dismissed.

== See also ==
- List of members of the United States Congress killed or wounded in office
- List of members of the United States Congress who died in office (1790–1899)

Political offices
Preceded by John McDougall	Lieutenant Governor of California; Acting; 1851–1852	Succeeded by Samuel Purdy
U.S. Senate
Preceded by John B. Weller	U.S. Senator (Class 1) from California; 1857–1859; Served alongside: William M. Gwin	Succeeded by Henry P. Haun
