= Broderick–Terry duel =

September 13, 1859 duel in California

Coordinates: 37.7082°N 122.4842°W

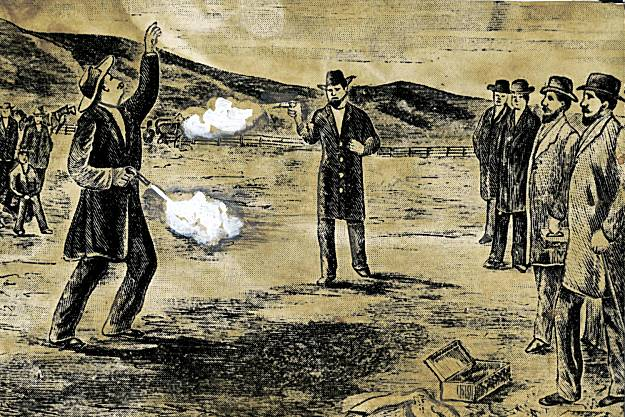
The duel between David C. Broderick and David S. Terry

The Broderick–Terry duel (subsequently called "the last notable American duel") was fought between United States Senator David C. Broderick, of California, and ex-Chief Justice David S. Terry, of the Supreme Court of California, on September 13, 1859. The two men had been friends and political allies within the Democratic Party. However, Broderick was opposed to slavery but not an abolitionist, whereas Terry was pro-slavery. Intense political disagreements led to bitter resentments, which in turn led to a challenge to a duel and the fatal encounter in a ravine near Lake Merced in San Francisco.

Not long after the duel, both public opinion and legislation turned strongly against the custom of dueling. The site of the duel is now a registered California Historical Landmark.

== Background ==
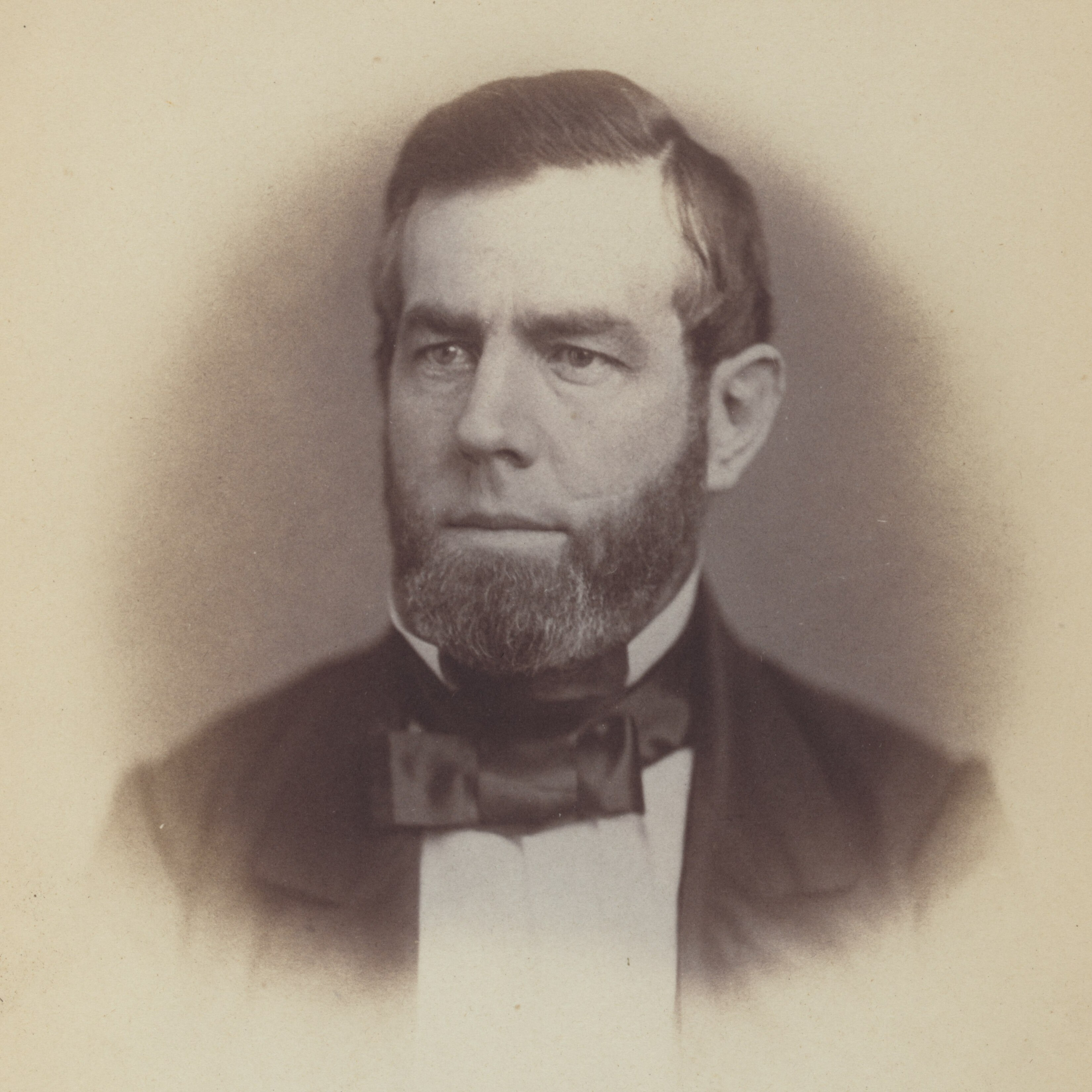
David C. Broderick

David S. Terry

Broderick and Terry belonged to opposite wings of the Democrat Party, Terry to the Chivalrist or Southern wing which sought to split California into two states and bring the southern half in as a slave state, and Broderick the leader of the anti-slavery wing which opposed the expansion of slavery. They were occasional allies, but never close friends. During the vigilante days of 1856, Broderick had said of Terry that he considered him to be "the only honest man on the Supreme bench". Broderick supported Terry and sought his freedom when Terry was imprisoned by the Citizens Vigilance Committee of 1856 .

The situation between the two men worsened during the election of 1859. The Democrats were in open rebellion over the issue of the expansion of slavery to the west. There were two Democrat conventions in Sacramento that year, the first in early June was the Broderick wing of the party, opposed to slavery. The Chivalrists stormed the convention and attempted to seize control, but were forced out. The second convention was the Chivalrist wing. The Chiv's were the dominant wing of the party, and controlled both houses of the legislature and the Governor's office. Terry was renominated as a Supreme Court Justice, but lost the election to a party stalwart by a huge margin, in large part because he had abandoned the party a few years earlier to become a Know Nothing. Terry sought to re-cement his role as a leading Democrat and following his election loss, delivered a fiery speech in favor of slavery, and vilifying the Chiv's principal enemy, David Broderick. Terry accused the anti-slavery faction as being followers of David Broderick, and insultingly, followers not of Stephen Douglas, the Little Giant, but of Frederick Douglas, the abolitionist, and of the delegates of belonging "heart soul body and breeches" to the abolitionists and their "master" Broderick. Broderick read the comments at breakfast at the International Hotel, and reportedly said:

"I see that Terry has been abusing me. I now take back the remark I once made that he is the only honest judge in the Supreme Court. I was his friend when he was in need of friends, for which I am sorry. Had the vigilance committee disposed of him as they did of others, they would have done a righteous act."

The remarks were overheard by Terry's old law partner, Duncan Perley, who relayed the comments to Terry. Perley challenged Broderick to a duel on behalf of his former partner, which Broderick declined on the basis that he was campaigning for his Broderick Democrats through the rest of the summer, and also because Perley was a Canadian and not of equal social standing.

The elections went against the Broderick wing of the party, and in Sept, Terry followed up with a letter to Broderick which was in fact a challenge to fight a duel:

Oakland, September 8, 1859.

Hon. D. C. Broderick—Sir: Some two months since, at the public table of the International Hotel, in San Francisco, you saw fit to indulge in certain remarks concerning me, which were offensive in their nature. Before I had heard of the circumstance, your note of 20th of June, addressed to Mr. D. W. Perley, in which you declared that you would not respond to any call of a personal character during the political canvass just concluded, had been published.

I have, therefore, not been permitted to take any notice of those remarks until the expiration of the limit fixed by yourself. I now take the earliest opportunity to require of you a retraction of those remarks. This note will be handed to you by my friend, Calhoun Benham, Esq., who is acquainted with its contents, and will receive your reply.

D. S. Terry.

After a few clarifications on what in particular Terry found to be offensive in his statements, Broderick agreed that it was Terry's call to decide whether those statements were offensive. Terry insisted on his interpretation of Broderick's statements, Broderick refused to retract them and the duel was scheduled. The day before the duel, Terry resigned as Chief Justice.

The first attempt to stage the duel was made a few days before September 13. This first attempt failed because of police intervention. Both Terry and Broderick agreed to make another attempt, and the location for the duel was moved to a secluded area near Lake Merced. The day was set for September 13. The weapons chosen were Belgian .58 caliber pistols. Terry was familiar with that model of pistol and had practiced with one before the duel, whereas Broderick did not.

As it was described later, "Both pistols had hair triggers, but Broderick's was more delicately set than Terry's, so much so that a jar might discharge it. Broderick's seconds were inexperienced men, and no one realized the importance of this difference."

In 1881, James O'Meara provided an eyewitness account of the duel. He wrote concerning Broderick:

His rigor of frame was so intense that, in the effort to adjust his pistol to the required position, he was obliged to use his left hand to bring his right arm into proper form; and in the effort he also so swerved his whole body that his right leg was pressed out of place, downward and forward, out of line with the left leg, and his chest was thrown out and quartering toward his antagonist, so as to present a larger surface for the chance of a shot aimed at him. He held his pistol in vise-like grip; and his wrist, instead of being in condition for ease of motion, was as an iron bolt, to move only with and as rigidly as the arm. He seemed the impersonation of that order of courage which faces death without terror, which prefers doom to the reproach of fear.

After Broderick was wounded and fell to the ground, one of the spectators tried to charge at Terry with a pistol. The spectator's name was Davis, and he claimed to be Broderick's friend. He was outraged by what he had interpreted as a murder.

Broderick had indeed been seriously wounded, and fought for his life for three days. He died at 9:20 a.m. on September 16, 1859.

One of Broderick's last pronouncements was: "They have killed me because I was opposed to slavery and a corrupt administration."

== Funeral of Broderick ==
After his violent death, Broderick was treated as a hero and a martyr for his cause - the fight against slavery. His funeral became one of the most prominent demonstrations of public support that the city of San Francisco had ever seen. He was buried at Lone Mountain Cemetery.

== Arrest and trial of Terry ==
Captain of Detectives I. W. Lees and Detective H. H. Ellis proceeded to Terry's home with a warrant against him. Ellis described the arrest:

Lees and I procured a warrant against Terry and had it properly endorsed. We then proceeded to Terry's home. When we arrived within about one hundred feet of the house, a window was thrown open and Calhoun Benham, Tom Hayes, Sheriff O'Neill and Terry leveled shotguns at us and told us to 'halt.' We did so and announced that we were officers with a warrant for Terry. He stated that he was certain that he would not receive a fair trial and feared violence at that time, but agreed to surrender three days afterward in Oakland. Knowing that he would keep his word in this, as we also knew he would do when he told us that if we came nearer to his house they would all shoot, we decided to allow him to dictate terms. He surrendered as per agreement, and the case was heard by Judge James Hardy in Marin County, a change of venue having been granted because of the alleged prejudice against Terry in San Francisco. This case was dismissed but Terry was subsequently indicted by the Grand Jury in San Mateo County. The point was then raised that he had been once in jeopardy, and being well taken, that case was also dismissed.

The Marin County trial of Terry was "most remarkable" in the sense that Judge Hardy, a political ally of Terry's, with the acquiescence of the district attorney, also an ally of Terry's, had allegedly set the clock in his courtroom an hour ahead of the time called for the trial, and then instructed the hastily impaneled jurors to find Terry not guilty when the prosecution witnesses were not present. When they eventually showed up, on time, the trial was already over.

== Commemoration ==
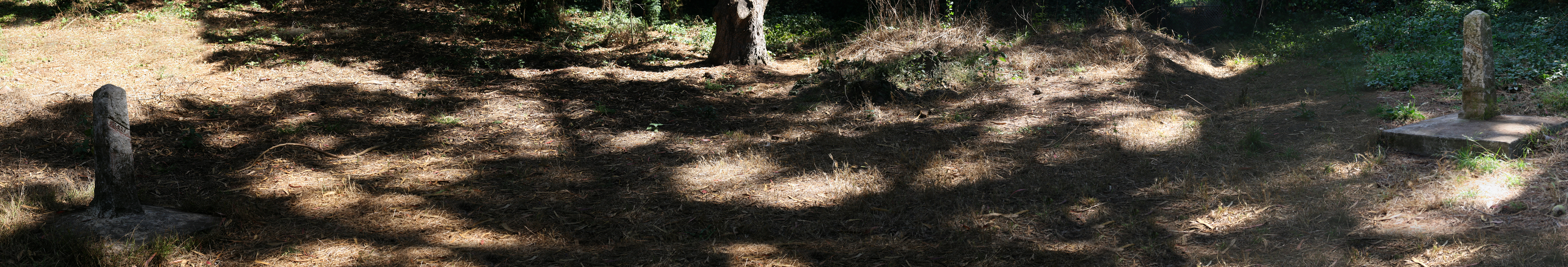
The site of the duel is marked with two small stone obelisks showing where each of the duelists stood. The obelisk on the left has the name Terry engraved on it, the right has the name Broderick engraved on it.

On June 1, 1932, the site of the duel was registered as California Registered Historical Landmark number 19, and in 1949, marker 19 was erected at the beginning of the trail that leads to the site. The marker was erected by the California Centennial Commission, County Board of Supervisors, and the San Mateo County Historical Association. There is also a directional obelisk which points towards the site of the duel. At the site itself, two more granite obelisks, each one engraved with the name of one of the combatants, mark the places where Broderick and Terry stood, 10 yards apart. The landmark and duel site is located at 1100 Lake Merced Boulevard, San Francisco, CA, 94015.

Dueling in California had been outlawed in the state's constitution of 1850, and had always been illegal, though the penalty in the Constitution was only that someone convicted of dueling could not hold state office.

Article XI, Section 10 provided:

Any citizen of this State who may hereafter be engaged, either directly or indirectly, in a duel, either as principal or accessory before the fact, shall forever be disqualified from holding any office under the Constitution and laws of this State.

That stricture was largely ignored prior to 1859. The outrage over Broderick's murder meant that this was the last duel of any great note. In 1872, 13 years after this duel the legislature passed laws against dueling, with enhanced punishment if the duel resulted in death. On November 25, 1998, the pistols that were used in the duel were sold at auction in San Francisco for $34,500.

== See also ==
- List of duels in the United States
