= 1904 United States presidential election in Maryland =

- November 8, 1904
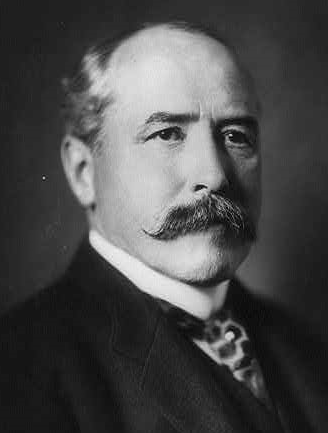

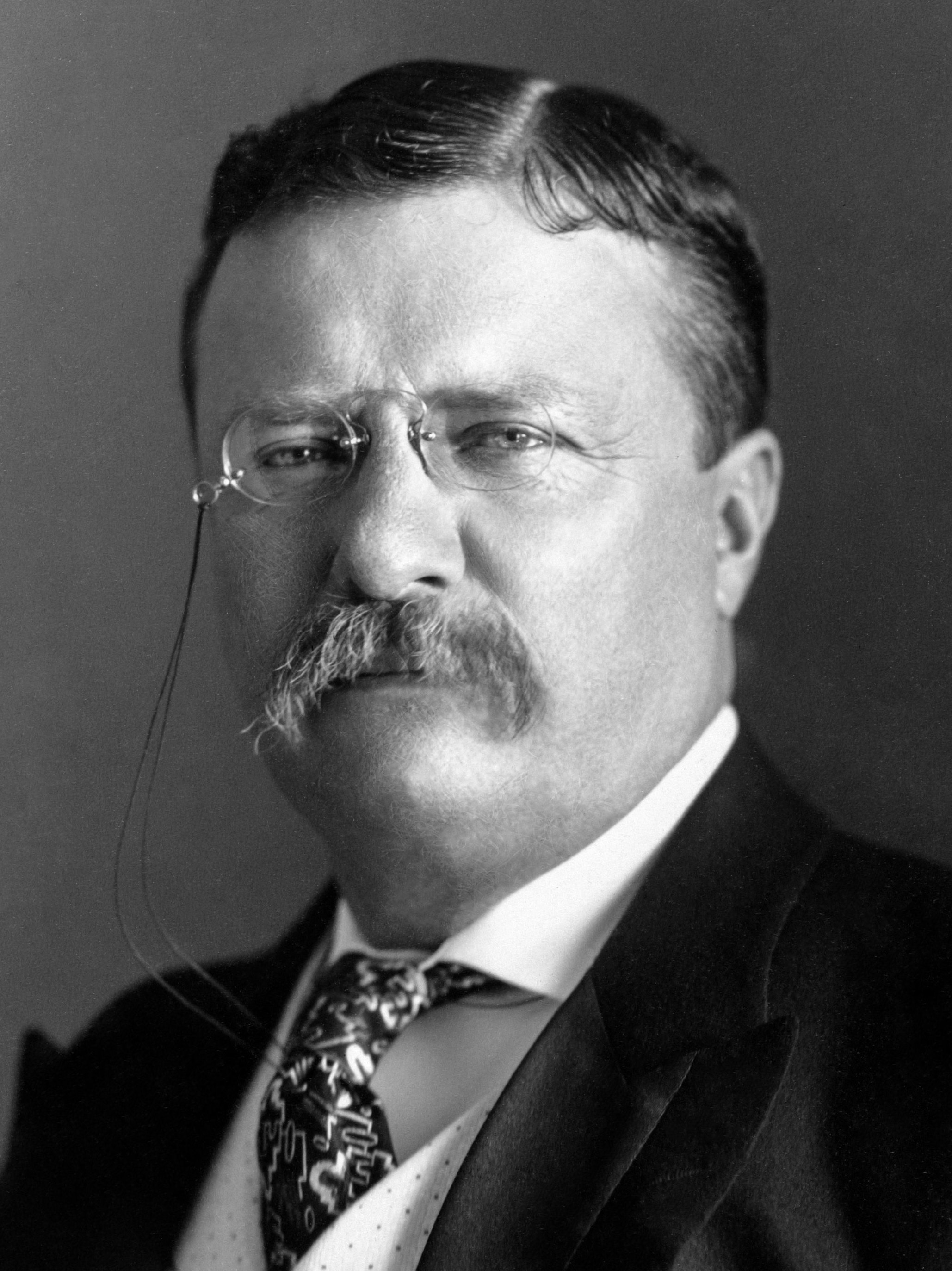
Nominee	Alton B. Parker	Theodore Roosevelt
Party	Democratic	Republican
Home state	New York	New York
Running mate	Henry G. Davis	Charles W. Fairbanks
Electoral vote	7 (Note: Seven of the eight highest electors were for Parker, but the highest Roosevelt elector, Charles J. Bonaparte, had 51 more votes than the highest Parker elector, Frank Brown.)	1
Popular vote	109,446	109,497
Percentage	48.81%	48.83%
County results
Parker
40–50%
50–60%
Roosevelt
50–60%
60–70%
President before election
Theodore Roosevelt
Republican
Elected President
Theodore Roosevelt
Republican

The 1904 United States presidential election in Maryland took place on November 8, 1904. All contemporary 45 states were part of the 1904 United States presidential election. State voters chose eight electors to the Electoral College, which selected the president and vice president.

The winner in Maryland depended on the votes, supposedly due to the "Wilson Law" designed to make it easier for Democrats to cast ballots for both Presidential electors and Congress by a simple turning down of a single fold in the ballot paper. Seven electoral votes were won by the Democratic nominees, Chief Judge Alton B. Parker of New York and his running mate Henry G. Davis of West Virginia, while the Republican nominees, President Theodore Roosevelt of New York and his running mate Charles W. Fairbanks of Indiana, won the popular vote and one electoral vote. Roosevelt's popular vote margin is the second-closest presidential election margin by number of votes on record, behind Henry Clay's four-vote 1832 win, also in Maryland. In this election, Maryland voted 18.81% more Democratic than the nation at-large.

== Results ==
General Election Results
Party	Pledged to	Elector	Votes
Republican Party	Theodore Roosevelt	Charles J. Bonaparte	109,497
Democratic Party	Alton B. Parker	Frank Brown	109,446
Democratic Party	Alton B. Parker	Elihu E. Jackson	107,477
Democratic Party	Alton B. Parker	Ferdinand Williams	107,460
Democratic Party	Alton B. Parker	John E. George	107,343
Democratic Party	Alton B. Parker	James King	107,333
Democratic Party	Alton B. Parker	T. Herbert Shriver	107,285
Democratic Party	Alton B. Parker	Samuel A. Mudd	107,278
Democratic Party	Alton B. Parker	Charles H. Knapp	107,276
Republican Party	Theodore Roosevelt	Calton L. Bretz	106,993
Republican Party	Theodore Roosevelt	Alfred G. Sturgiss	106,896
Republican Party	Theodore Roosevelt	R. Rastall Walker	106,876
Republican Party	Theodore Roosevelt	Robert Ogle	106,787
Republican Party	Theodore Roosevelt	Edward M. Allen, Jr.	106,721
Republican Party	Theodore Roosevelt	J. Webb Thomas	106,709
Republican Party	Theodore Roosevelt	George A. Hartman	106,694
Prohibition Party	Silas C. Swallow	William Gisriel	3,034
Prohibition Party	Silas C. Swallow	Frank Higgins	2,971
Prohibition Party	Silas C. Swallow	William Kleinle	2,874
Prohibition Party	Silas C. Swallow	Lawrence Hastings	2,849
Prohibition Party	Silas C. Swallow	Samuel R. Neave	2,849
Prohibition Party	Silas C. Swallow	Summerfield Baldwin	2,848
Prohibition Party	Silas C. Swallow	John M. Macklem	2,838
Prohibition Party	Silas C. Swallow	Edward Richardson	2,821
Socialist Party	Eugene V. Debs	Martin Glass	2,247
Socialist Party	Eugene V. Debs	Edward A. Ferrari	2,225
Socialist Party	Eugene V. Debs	Benjamin W. Diffenbaugh	2,180
Socialist Party	Eugene V. Debs	Alexander Monroe	2,177
Socialist Party	Eugene V. Debs	Moses Miller	2,160
Socialist Party	Eugene V. Debs	Frank Mareck	2,151
Socialist Party	Eugene V. Debs	Patrick O'Connor	2,146
Socialist Party	Eugene V. Debs	Charles F. Saunders	2,145
Write-in	N/A	Scattering	4
People's Party	Thomas E. Watson	N/A	1
Votes cast (Note: Based on totals for highest elector on each ticket)			224,229

=== Results by county ===
County	Theodore Roosevelt Republican		Alton Brooks Parker Democratic		Silas Comfort Swallow Prohibition		Eugene Victor Debs Social Democratic		Margin		Total votes cast
County	#	%	#	%	#	%	#	%	#	%	Total votes cast
Allegany	5,232	56.32%	3,326	35.81%	318	3.42%	413	4.45%	1,906	20.52%	9,289
Anne Arundel	2,849	47.64%	3,001	50.18%	108	1.81%	22	0.37%	-152	-2.54%	5,980
Baltimore	7,570	43.89%	9,394	54.47%	194	1.12%	88	0.51%	-1,824	-10.58%	17,246
Baltimore City	47,444	48.64%	47,901	49.11%	731	0.75%	1,461	1.50%	-457	-0.47%	97,537
Calvert	1,030	57.48%	740	41.29%	17	0.95%	5	0.28%	290	16.18%	1,792
Caroline	1,452	43.09%	1,809	53.68%	86	2.55%	23	0.68%	-357	-10.59%	3,370
Carroll	3,357	47.77%	3,527	50.19%	130	1.85%	13	0.19%	-170	-2.42%	7,027
Cecil	2,425	48.14%	2,554	50.70%	53	1.05%	5	0.10%	-129	-2.56%	5,037
Charles	1,659	57.80%	1,180	41.11%	24	0.84%	7	0.24%	479	16.69%	2,870
Dorchester	2,680	55.04%	2,087	42.86%	86	1.77%	16	0.33%	593	12.18%	4,869
Frederick	5,788	52.83%	5,004	45.67%	149	1.36%	15	0.14%	784	7.16%	10,956
Garrett	2,051	66.96%	947	30.92%	47	1.53%	18	0.59%	1,104	36.04%	3,063
Harford	2,561	43.91%	3,151	54.02%	117	2.01%	4	0.07%	-590	-10.11%	5,833
Howard	1,258	39.00%	1,914	59.33%	40	1.24%	14	0.43%	-656	-20.33%	3,226
Kent	1,841	47.91%	1,956	50.90%	44	1.14%	2	0.05%	-115	-2.99%	3,843
Montgomery	2,711	46.09%	3,082	52.40%	79	1.34%	10	0.17%	-371	-6.31%	5,882
Prince George's	2,845	55.36%	2,270	44.17%	18	0.35%	6	0.12%	575	11.19%	5,139
Queen Anne's	1,487	38.28%	2,258	58.12%	130	3.35%	10	0.26%	-771	-19.85%	3,885
Somerset	1,874	51.53%	1,580	43.44%	177	4.87%	6	0.16%	294	8.08%	3,637
St. Mary's	1,174	48.00%	1,247	50.98%	21	0.86%	4	0.16%	-73	-2.98%	2,446
Talbot	1,999	50.53%	1,861	47.04%	89	2.25%	7	0.18%	138	-3.49%	3,956
Washington	4,581	51.86%	4,064	46.01%	103	1.17%	85	0.96%	517	5.85%	8,833
Wicomico	2,179	44.47%	2,593	52.92%	127	2.59%	1	0.02%	-414	-8.45%	4,900
Worcester	1,450	40.19%	2,000	55.43%	146	4.05%	12	0.33%	-550	-15.24%	3,608
Totals	109,497	48.83%	109,446	48.81%	3,034	1.35%	2,247	1.00%	51	0.02%	224,229 (Note: This total include five write-in votes not grouped by county, one of which was for Populist nominee Thomas E. Watson, who was on the ballot in 34 of the contemporary 45 states.)

==== Counties that flipped from Republican to Democratic ====
- Anne Arundel
- Baltimore (County)
- Baltimore (City)
- Caroline
- Carroll
- Kent
- St. Mary's

== See also ==
- United States presidential elections in Maryland
- 1904 United States presidential election
- 1904 United States elections
