= The House On Octavia Street =

1984 horror novel by Jacqueline La Tourrette

- First edition
- Author: Jacqueline La Tourrette
- Language: English
- Genre: Gothic fiction Supernatural fiction Historical fiction
- Publisher: Beaufort Books
- Publication date: 1984
- Publication place: United States
- ISBN: 9780825301940 (hardcover edition)
- OCLC: 10162326

The House On Octavia Street is a 1984 gothic occult historical fiction novel written by Jacqueline La Tourrette. Allegedly based on true events, the book follows the story of Teresa Percy, a poor farm girl who flees domestic violence and becomes the elegant but sheltered protégé of a powerful woman who uses black magic and voodoo to seduce wealthy men.

== Background ==
The House On Octavia Street was written as a gothic historical fiction based on the occupants of California's Bell Mansion at 1661 Octavia Street, San Francisco, California, including owner Thomas Bell and his co-inhabiting business partner, Mary Ellen Pleasant, who had designed much of the mansion in real-life. Teresa Clingnan-Harris Bell, Thomas Bell's wife, also occupied the house until her death in 1922. The story of these three occupants, particularly Mary Ellen Pleasant, is considerably less sensational in real-life and includes no true historical record of her using black magic to commit or attract murder in her lifetime, instead being largely involved with politics and civil rights for African Americans. According to NBC News, Mary Ellen Pleasant "faced animosity and vicious rumors that painted her as merely Bell’s mistress and denigrated her boarding houses as brothels while claiming she practiced voodoo".

A fact which The House On Octavia Street does report correctly is the alleged illegitimacy of Teresa Clingnan-Harris Bell's many children (Teresa claimed that none of her husband's children were biologically or legally hers and left each of them just $5 from her late husband's $10 million dollar fortune). Other aspects of the book, including the possibility of Mary Ellen Pleasant running brothels, taking on the nickname "Mammy" herself, having a secret sexual affair with Thomas Bell or practicing the occult, are contentious and considered rumour by a number of critics. Commenting on the rumours about Mary Ellen Pleasant in an article for HouseHistree, historian Mark Meredith stated, "Mary Ellen's many achievements speak for themselves, but she remains an elusive figure and stories about her run wild, both good and bad. A key to her success had been keeping a low profile, but this also gave fuel to her detractors of which there were no shortage. They were all too happy to repeat and add spice to any seditious stories made to smear her character. Perhaps some were true - but the majority were almost certainly not." In fact, Mary Ellen was left insolvent by the time of her death in 1904. Other historians disagree on the facts of Mary Ellen Pleasant's life, such as Susheel Bibbs and Lydia Hudson, both of whom noted that tabloid newspapers have largely confused society on the true facts of who Mary Ellen was and what she did in life.

== Plot ==
Teresa Percy flees her abusive husband, a gambling addict, from New York City to San Francisco in the mid-19th century. Her new friend Lizzie, a prostitute, introduces her to Ms. Mary Ellen "Mammy" Pleasant, a mysterious local socialite infamous for having "rescued" and gainfully employed numerous black people who were former slaves and part of southern America's African-American diaspora. Teresa is lured to Mammy's boarding house and given a chance to receive a proper education, which also includes language lessons, etiquette and an introduction to wild herbs and flowers in the area, as Mammy uses them for cooking and is renowned for this talent. Despite Teresa's transformation from a humble farm girl into an elegant lady, she is naive and still harbours prejudices towards non-white classes, including Billy, a black man employed by Mammy. Billy takes a liking to Teresa, and Teresa gradually accepts him as a friend. Teresa is surprised when Billy makes disparaging remarks about Mammy in secrecy one day, warning Teresa to flee because other girls taken in by Mammy have been murdered in the past. Teresa finds this odd, but she takes it to heart and begins keeping a private diary to record the increasingly peculiar events going on in her life.

After a biracial girl named Melba is murdered during a party hosted by Mammy, which involves occult rituals and religious dancing, Teresa becomes increasingly suspicious of Mammy. It is revealed that Mammy took Teresa in to seduce her wealthy, kind-hearted old business partner Thomas Bell (who runs a mercury mining company), while Mammy herself hopes to marry him. Through an elaborate scheme, Mammy leads the man to believe that he has fathered a bastard child, which Teresa agrees to raise for him, despite the child not being hers biologically. The bizarre establishment of Teresa's new quasi-family unfolds with the revelation that Mammy herself is partly black by race, deeply hurt by the slavery that affected her family in the past, having dabbled in occultism and gradually becoming an experienced priestess in order to gain more power for herself.

== Reception ==
The House On Octavia Street received a largely negative reception from Kirkus Reviews, which praised the book's political exposition and compared the story to Pygmalion, but argued that the book's characters were "stodgy" and that the plot was repetitive. The Asbury Park Press was more positive, stating of the book, "this intriguing novel is set in turn-of-the-century San Francisco, when white slavery, murder and mayhem ran rampant and nobody did too much about it." The Publishers Weekly praised the portrayal of Mary Ellen Pleasant as "a rich, self-effacing, influential woman who takes young girls under her wing", but had little else to say about the book in terms of criticism or praise.
