= David Neagle =

United States law enforcement officer (1847–1925)

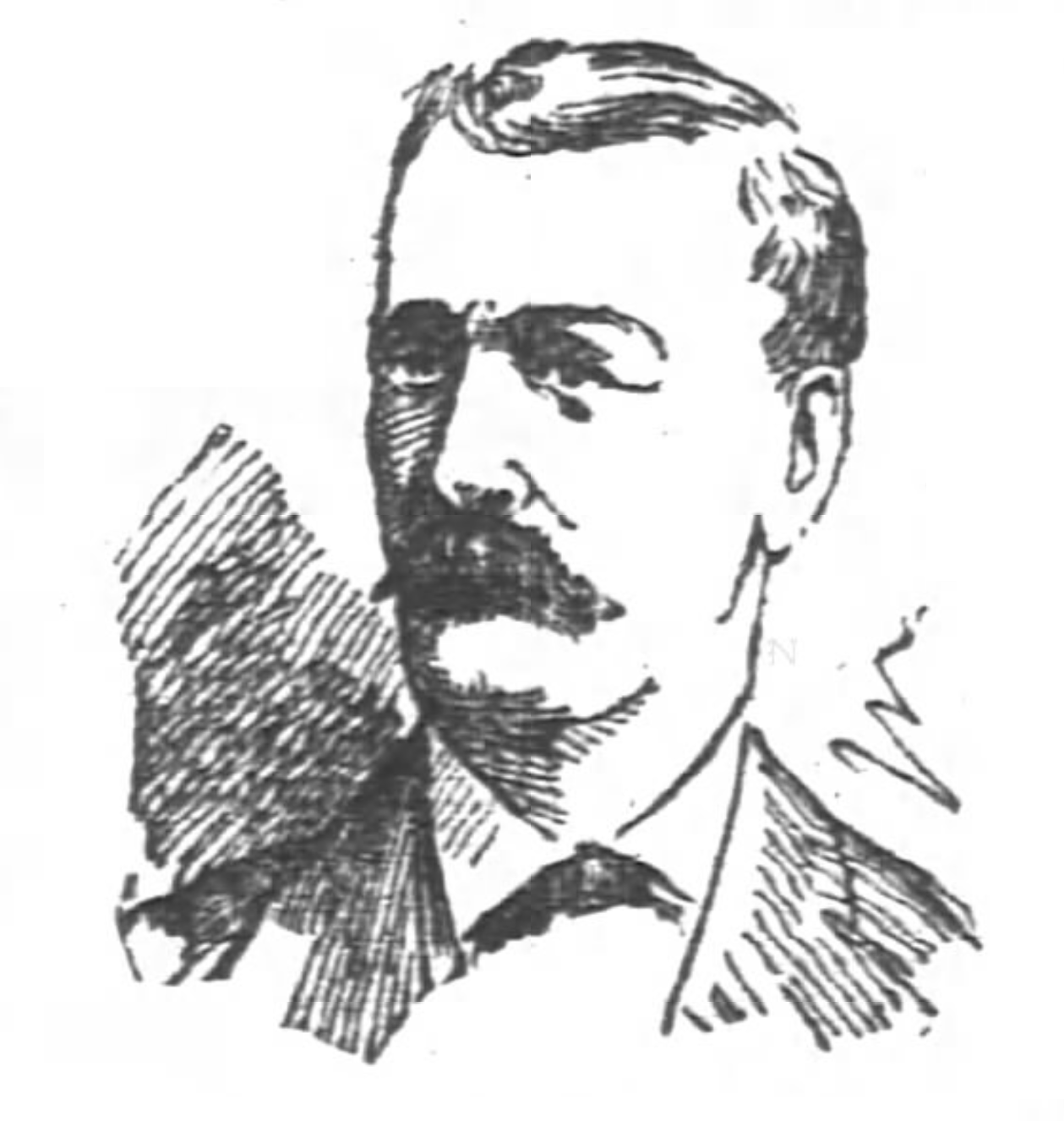
- David J. Neagle
- Born: October 10, 1847; Boston, Massachusetts
- Died: November 28, 1925 (aged 78); Oakland, California
- Occupations: Saloon owner, miner, police officer, Deputy U.S. Marshal
- Years active: 1870–1906
- Known for: Killing former California Supreme Court Chief Justice David S. Terry; Establishing precedent In re Neagle for U.S. Marshals to protect judges
- Spouse: Bertha Blanch (m. 1874)

David Butler Neagle (October 10, 1847—November 28, 1925) was a Deputy U.S. Marshal who, while guarding Associate Supreme Court Justice Stephen J. Field, killed former California Chief Justice David S. Terry when he assaulted Field. Neagle was arrested by the county sheriff and charged with murder. Insisting he was acting within his capacity as a federal marshal, his case went to the U.S. Supreme Court, which in In re Neagle affirmed the executive branch's right to protect judges and the supremacy of federal law over state law.

He met Bertha Blanch in 1870. They had two daughters, Louisa and Emma, who died before their sixth birthday. They were married in 1874 and later had Winifred Mary and Albert Victor. He was also a saloon owner, miner and deputy town marshal in Tombstone, Arizona Territory shortly after the Gunfight at the OK Corral.

== Early life ==
Neagle was the son of Irish immigrants William Neagle and Bridget (née) Donahue. He was born in Boston on October 10, 1847. In 1852 his parents took him and his sister Mary to San Francisco. His mother Bridget died soon after their arrival, and his father placed Mary in the Female Orphan Asylum. At age 10 David began attending the Roman Catholic School at Santa Clara, which later became Santa Clara College. San Francisco was the financial center through which the wealth of the California Gold Rush and the Comstock Lode passed. At age 15 in 1862 Neagle left for Florence, Idaho Territory, where gold had been discovered the prior year. He returned to San Francisco in 1863 and resumed his schooling, but soon left to join the miners in Virginia City, Treasure City, and later Pioche, Nevada.

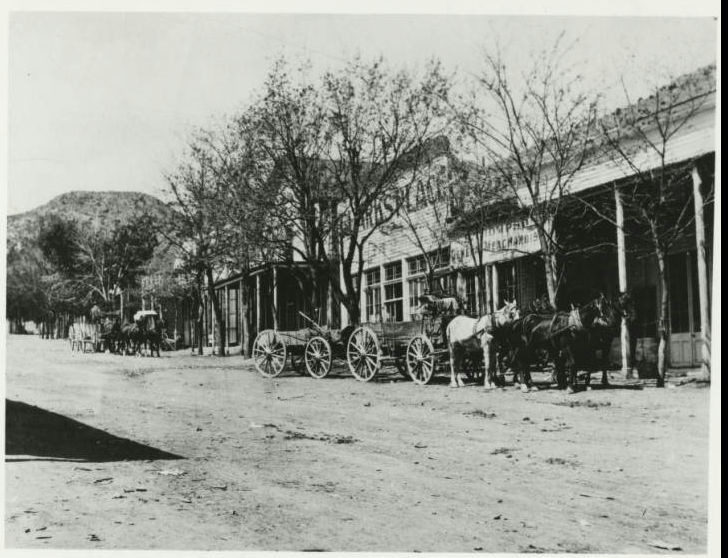
Pioche, Nevada in 1906

Outside the Midnight Star Saloon in Pioche on the evening of May 30, 1871, Neagle's friend Mike Casey and Tom Gasson had a heated argument. Casey pulled his pistol and shot Gasson. Before Gasson died a week later, he wrote out a will that promised $5,000 (approximately $134,000 today). to the man who avenged his death.

Casey claimed self defense at the inquest, but miner and witness Jim Leavy contradicted his testimony. Casey was furious and called on Leavy to defend himself. Leavy did not own a pistol, so he borrowed one. In one of the few known instances, they faced each other in a classic Western shoot out in an alley. Leavy shot first, grazing Casey's skull, and then shot him in the neck. Casey fell to the ground, mortally wounded, and Leavy charged him and pistol-whipped him. Neagle was also in the alley. He shot Leavy, hitting him in the face. His bullet perforated both of Leavy's cheeks and shattered his jaw, but Leavy survived, although permanently disfigured.

Leavy collected the $5,000 and developed a reputation as a gunfighter, leading to his death in Tucson, Arizona Territory in 1882. Neagle earned a reputation as "being one of the fastest pistol shots in the West, and of indisputable courage."

In 1874 Neagle learned of a promising silver and copper find in Panamint, California, near Death Valley, and was one of the first to arrive in the newly founded boom town. He opened a saloon named the Oriental with boards across two barrels in front of a tent. It grew into an elaborate frame building with a black walnut bar, fixtures valued at $10,000, a billiard table, paintings of nude women, and two gambling rooms. He bought an entire town block and subdivided it. To protect customers from stray bullets in the untamed town, he reinforced the walls of his saloon with sheets of corrugated iron. The national bank panic beginning in 1873 and the subsequent collapse of the Bank of California on August 26, 1875 caused investor confidence to fail, and by November 1875 Panamint was virtually abandoned. Neagle may have left with about $20,000 (or about $586,000 today). He reported a murder in Darwin City, Nevada on August 5, 1875, to the state capital in Carson City. On July 24, 1876, a flash flood roared down the canyon and washed out most of the town.

Neagle returned to Virginia City, where his sister Mary lived with her husband Jim Kelley and son Tom, and opened a saloon named The Capital. After about six months he took his family and was soon employed as a mine foreman while working a gold claim of his own near Prescott, Arizona Territory. In 1877, he hurt his leg badly in a fall, and for the next year he struggled to get well, so he returned to San Francisco. He later worked mines in Utah, Idaho, Wyoming, Arizona, and Sonora, Mexico. He was in Tucson on June 28, 1880, and soon moved to the silver-mining boom town of Tombstone, Arizona Territory.

== Life in Tombstone ==
On July 15, 1880, Neagle, his wife Bertha and their infant daughter Winnie arrived in Tombstone, Arizona. John Behan, who he knew from his time in Prescott three years prior, arrived with his young son Albert on September 14, 1880. Neagle hoped to operate a mine as he had in the past. But he was hired by Behan as a Pima County deputy sheriff and pursued stage robbers and stock rustlers, one time alongside Wyatt and Morgan Earp.

Deputy US Marshal and Tombstone City Marshal Virgil Earp was on the January ballot as the Citizen's Party candidate for city marshal when he was ambushed and severely wounded on December 27, 1881, Neagle, representing the People's Independent Party, was elected city marshal on January 4, 1882. Four months later, he and one of his new deputies Joe Poynton attempted to quell a group of Mexicans celebrating Cinco de Mayo by shooting their weapons on the air. Antonio Figueroa shot and seriously wounded Poynton. Neagle pursued Figueroa, and when he would not stop, shot him in the back, killing him.

Neagle was careful in choosing his friends, and never became closely allied with the loose confederation of outlaws known as the Cochise County Cowboys. This won him respect from both Democrats and Republicans in Tombstone. Fred Dodge described Neagle as a "square man [who] could not tolerate the work of Johnny Behan and there was a sure and final break between the two." Both Behan and Neagle wanted the job as county sheriff. Behan could not secure enough backing from other Democrats and dropped out of the race. Neagle, disenchanted by the Democratic back room dealing, was on the ballot on November 15, 1882, for Cochise County sheriff as an independent, but lost to Republican Jerome L. Ward.

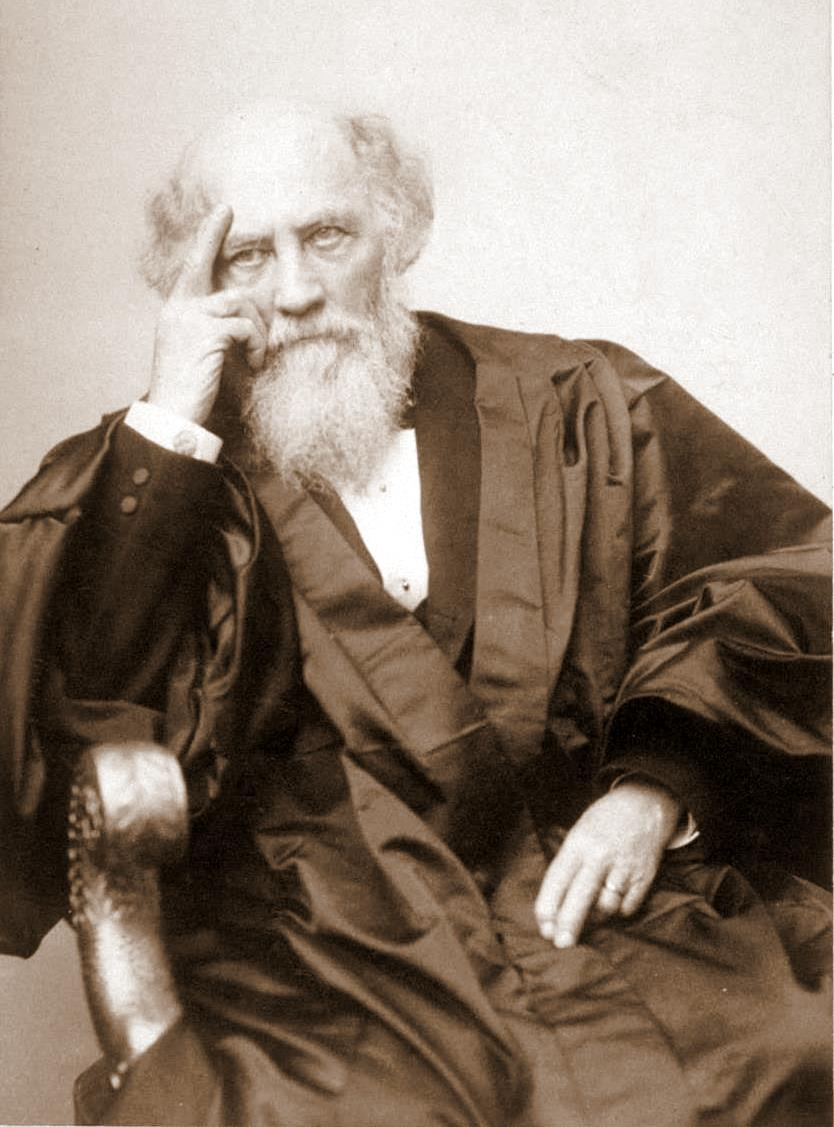
Stephen Johnson Field

== Mining interests ==
In 1883 Neagle worked in Anaconda, Montana Territory in the booming mining district around Butte. He won a woodcutting contract from Marcus Daly, owner of the Anconda Smelting Works, for 30,000 cords of wood at $2.60 per cord, worth $75,000 (around $2,592,000 today). He hired dozens of men to fulfill the contract. He also built the flume to transport the lumber to the mill site. When his partner Maginnis absconded with their employees' wages, Neagle went after him. On March 1, 1884, he confronted Maginnis and demanded he return the money. One account states that Mcginnis attacked Neagle with a knife, while another reports he shot Mcginnis in the back. The local paper of Deer Lodge Montana reported "the ball entered the breast." Neagle shot Mcginnis, though he survived. Cleared at a hearing, Neagle was viewed as a hero by his employees. He owned considerable property in the area before he left.

== Career as marshal ==
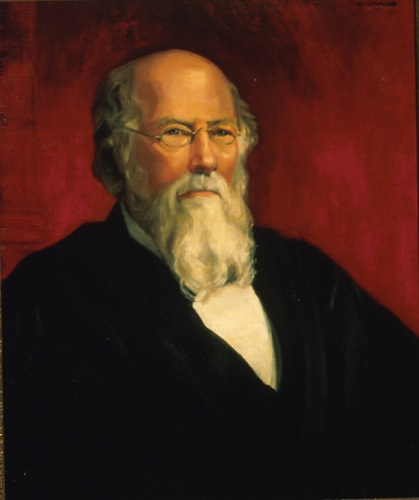
Associate Supreme Court Justice Stephen J. Field

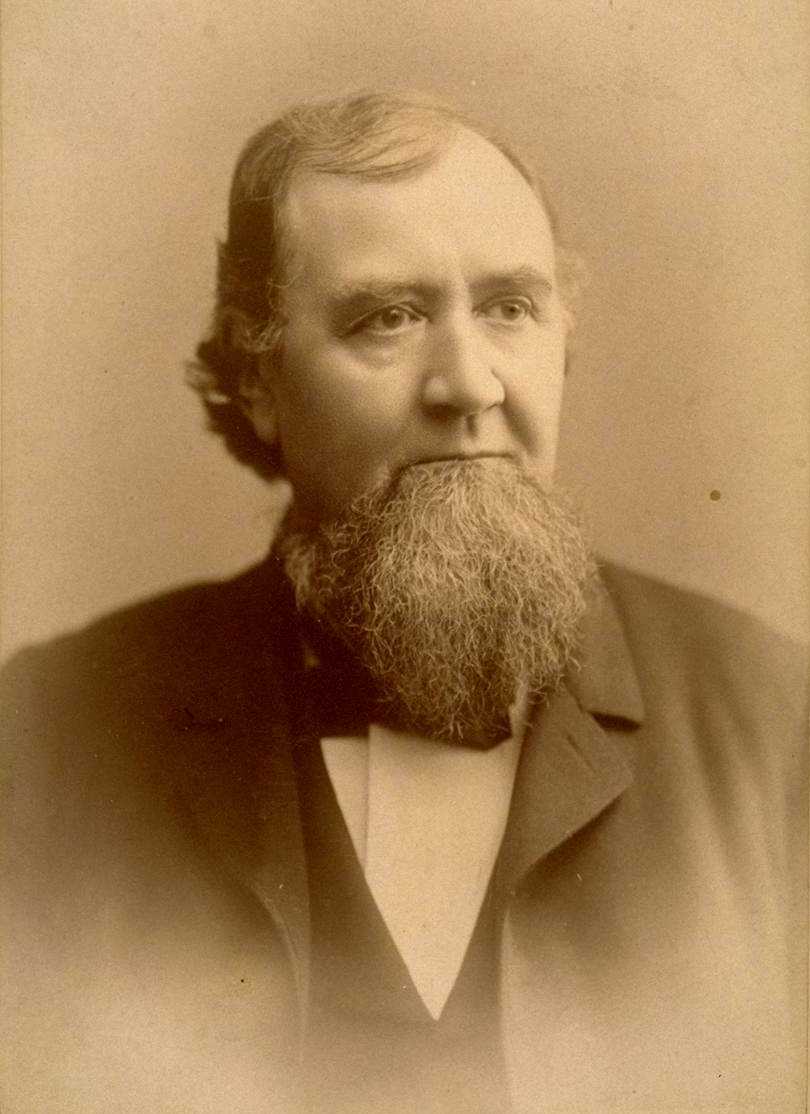
Attorney and former Chief Justice of the California Supreme Court David S. Terry.

In 1859 Stephen J. Field had replaced the former Chief Justice of the California Supreme Court, David S. Terry, after Terry killed California United States Senator David Colbreth Broderick in a duel. Terry was charged with a crime, but was acquitted while the witnesses were en route and left the state. Thirty years after the two men first met, Field had another encounter with Terry in a volatile public scandal. Terry was a big man, known for his physical strength and for his skill with the Bowie knife he routinely carried in a sheath under his coat.

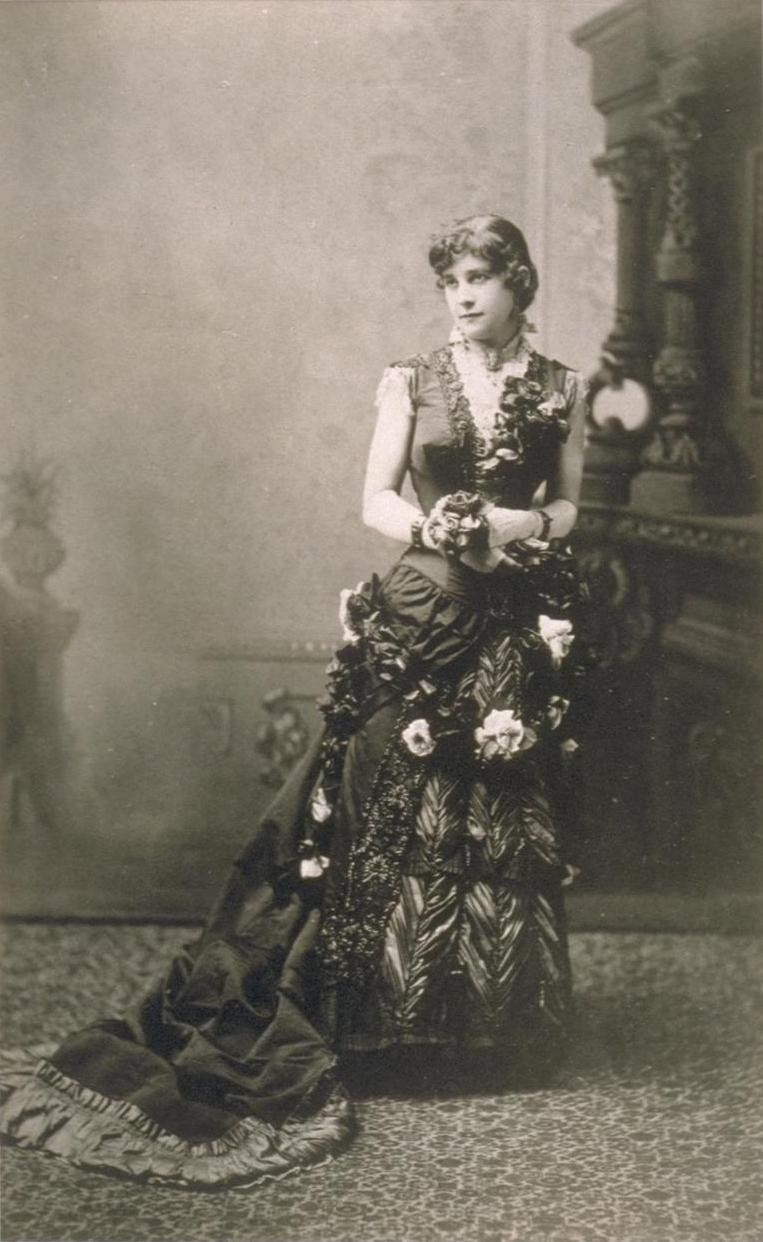
Sarah Althea Hill

Sarah Althea Hill was a 30-year-old mentally unstable woman with a history of violent behavior. She carried a small-caliber Colt revolver in her purse and did not hesitate to threaten all who crossed her. She attracted the attention of 60-year-old widower and millionaire William Sharon, president of the Bank of California and owner of the Palace Hotel and of other properties. He gave her $500 (about $17,000 today) per month and a room in the San Francisco Grand Hotel, adjoining the Palace Hotel where he lived, for the pleasure of her companionship. After just over a year, he tried to end the relationship, but she would not agree. He finally evicted her from the room by having the carpets ripped up and the door hinges removed, along with a $7,500 (around $259,000) payment.

When he began a relationship with another woman, she claimed to be his wife and sued him for adultery. One of her attorneys was David Terry. Sharon countersued, claiming that the marriage contract she produced was fraudulent.

=== Sharon vs. Sharon ===
As was the custom at the time, U.S. Supreme Court Associate Justice Fields was assigned to assist the California Circuit Court. He was coincidentally assigned to the Sharon vs. Sharon case. After William Sharon died on November 13, 1885, his son and son-in-law carried on the case. Hill/Sharon produced a handwritten will that she said she had found in his desk. It gave Sharon's entire estate to Hill and nothing to his son Frederick and son-in-law Frank Newlands. Those who knew Sharon doubted its authenticity. She married her attorney Terry on January 7, 1886, in Stockton.

=== Judge Sawyer attacked ===
In January 1886, a U.S. circuit court judge and a U.S. district court judge sitting as a Circuit Judge rendered a decision against the defendants, ruling the marriage contract was a forgery. The Terrys were jailed when they refused to comply with the court's order to turn over the invalid contract to the court. They returned to the court in March 1888, seeking further relief. Oral arguments was heard by Justice Field, sitting as circuit court justice, Circuit Court Judge Lorenzo Sawyer, and District Court Judge George Myron Sabin. The court took the matter under advisement. After the court hearing, Judge Sawyer encountered the Terrys on a train between Fresno and San Francisco on August 14, 1888. When Terry and his wife saw Sawyer on the train, the newspapers reported:

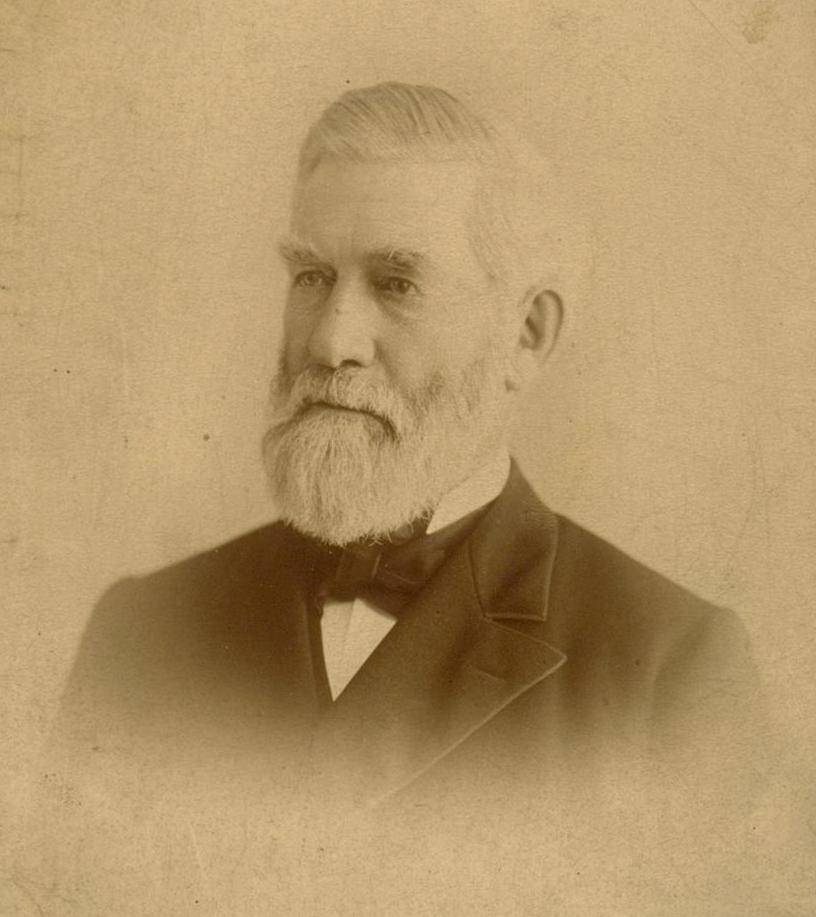
Judge Lorenzo Sawyer

Mrs. Terry grossly insulted Judge Sawyer... pulled his hair with a vicious jerk, and then, in an excited manner... said: "I will give him a taste of what he will get by and by. Let him render this decision if he dares." Terry then made a remark about too many witnesses being in the railroad car, adding that the best thing to do with him [Judge Sawyer] would be to take him out into the bay, and drown him.

Her husband watched her actions and smilingly approved.

=== Judge Field rules against Terrys ===
On September 3, 1888, Field delivered the final Circuit Court opinion. He ruled that the will was a forgery. Althea suddenly stood up, screamed obscenities at the judge, and fumbled in her handbag for her revolver. When Marshal John Franks and others attempted to escort her from the courtroom, attorney Terry rose to defend his wife and drew his Bowie knife. He hit Frank, knocking out a tooth, and the marshals drew their handguns. Spectators subdued Terry and led him out of the courtroom, where he pulled his Bowie knife again, threatening all around him. David Neagle was among the spectators present and put his pistol in Terry's face. Both Terrys were subdued and placed under arrest. Justice Field had them returned to the courtroom and sentenced both to jail for contempt of court. David Terry got six months in jail, and Sarah Terry got one month.

While being transported to jail and while serving their sentences, Terry and his wife repeatedly threatened Field. The Terrys suffered several more setbacks. Both David and Althea were indicted by a federal grand jury on criminal charges arising out of their behavior in the courtroom before Justice Field. In May 1889, the U.S. Supreme Court refused to review the order that invalidated Althea Terry's marriage contract with Senator Sharon. Then, in July, with only one of the four judges who had earlier ruled in their favor, the California Supreme Court reversed itself. It ruled that because Althea Terry and Sharon had kept their alleged marriage a secret, they were never legally married. While in jail or shortly afterward, pregnant Althea suffered a miscarriage.

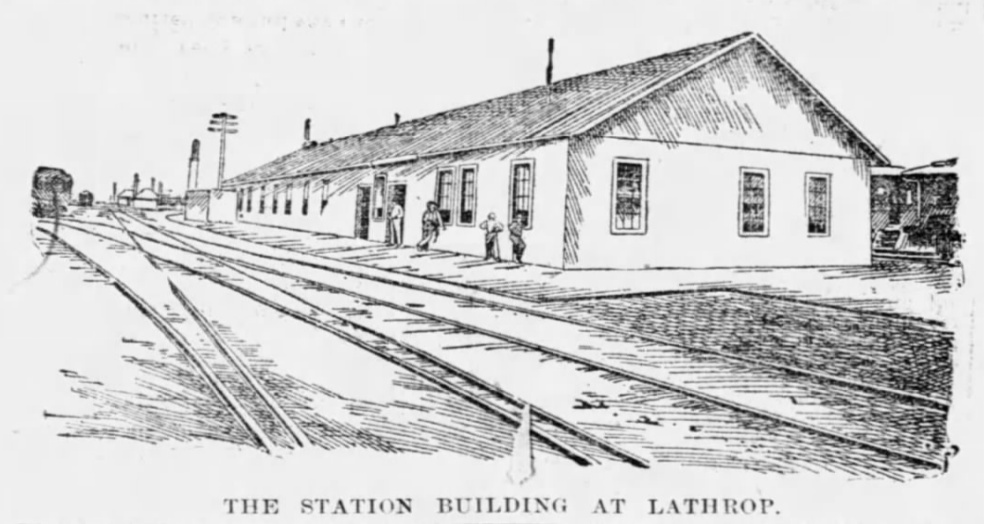
Lathrop, California rail road station in 1889

=== Attack expected ===
The newspapers followed the case and repeatedly speculated about the likelihood of an attack on Field. In 1886 and 1888, Franks had appointed Neagle a special deputy to supervise congressional election returns in a rough precinct of San Francisco. When Field returned to California as judge of the 9th Circuit Court in 1889, U.S. Attorney General William Miller instructed Franks to appoint Neagle as a deputy marshal with responsibility for protecting Field.

It is due to the dignity and independence of the court, and the character of its judge, that no effort on the part of the government shall be spared to make them feel entirely safe and free from anxiety in the discharge of their high duties.

=== Terry killed ===
When David and Althea Terry were released from jail, they returned to Fresno. On August 14, 1889, they boarded a train in Fresno on which, unbeknownst to them, Field and Neagle were returning from Los Angeles. Field soon learned of Terry's presence. At 7:10 am, the train stopped at Lathrop, California for breakfast. Neagle encouraged Judge Field to remain aboard the train, but he refused. All of the passengers disembarked to eat breakfast in the railroad station dining room. Neagle told the conductor to send for the local constable and request that he come at once, but the constable could not be immediately located.

After entering the dining room, Althea Terry saw Field. She quickly exited and returned to her railroad car, apparently to fetch the satchel in which she was known to carry a pistol. Her husband slowly came across the dining room and walked behind Field. Neagle watched him out of the corner of his eye and thought Terry might be exiting the dining room. Suddenly Terry slapped Field. The account in the San Francisco Chronicle the next day reported that Terry slapped Field on the cheek with great force from behind. Field was staggered by the blow and his glasses were knocked off. Other reports said Terry slapped Field twice.

Neagle, who was 5'7" tall and weighed 145 pounds, testified that the 6'3", 250-pound Terry recognized Neagle from the earlier confrontation in the courtroom. Neagle later said he saw a look of determination and victory on Terry's face. Neagle rose from his chair and said, "Stop that! I am an officer." Terry drew back his hand, and Neagle was not sure if he was about to deliver another blow, or reaching for his knife. Neagle drew his .45 caliber revolver and shot Terry in the heart at point-blank range. As Terry fell backward, Neagle fired again, nicking his ear. Neagle announced to the 80 to 100 people in the dining room, "I am a United States Marshal and I defy anyone to touch me!" Field told them that Terry had assaulted him "and my officer shot him."

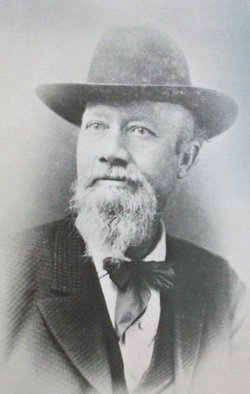
San Joaquin County Sheriff Thomas Cunningham

Althea was held at the door by one of the dining room proprietors. She screamed and pushed her way through the crowd, throwing herself over her husband's body. Neagle thought he saw her covertly remove David Terry's knife from his vest. She challenged the crowd to search his body, insistent he was unarmed. The knife was later found in her satchel with the pistol.

=== Neagle arrested ===
Neagle and Field reboarded the train and locked themselves in their cabin. Althea attempted to enter their car, saying she wished to slap Field. Neagle insisted that she be kept out or he would kill her too. A few minutes later Constable Walker of Lathrop and Stanislaus County Sheriff Purvis arrived. Neagle provided a document issued by the U.S. Attorney General appointing him as a special Marshal to protect Field. Walker arrested Neagle and took him to the county jail in Stockton. Neagle refused to say anything about the shooting. San Joaquin Sheriff Thomas Cunningham telegraphed San Francisco officers requested that Field be arrested upon his arrival in Oakland. This was not done. Field telegraphed the Marshal's office in Stockton, who relayed the information to the U.S. Attorney General. The United States Attorney in San Francisco filed a writ of habeas corpus for Neagle's release. The circuit court held a hearing and issued the writ. Sheriff Cunningham, with the aid of the State of California, appealed to the United States Supreme Court. Cunningham's appeal was based on whether Neagle acted in pursuance of the law when he shot Terry. Neagle's defense was based on the letter from Miller to Marshal Franks.

Neagle later described the shooting.

Justice Field and myself were at breakfast. I saw Terry coming. He approached Justice Field from behind. As he stood over him with clenched fists, as though about to strike him, or apparently to fall upon him in the excitement and anger, I sprang up and forward, and with my right hand grasped him by the coat, while I drew my revolver with my left. As he turned toward me I had him just right. I thrust the revolver forward and pulled twice. It was a self actor (Note: A self-acting pistol fires a round each time the trigger is pulled, as opposed to a single-action, which requires the shooter to manually cock the gun before pulling the trigger to fire.) and he fell.

Sarah Terry, widowed by her husband's death, gradually went insane. She wandered the streets of San Francisco aimlessly, ignoring her appearance. She constantly talked to "spirits," especially that of her husband. She was diagnosed with "dementia praecox," an early term for schizophrenia. On March 2, 1892, she was found insane and committed at age 41 to the California Asylum at Stockton, where she lived for 45 years until her death. Justice Field remained on the bench another decade before retiring.

== Supreme Court precedent ==
In a 6–2 decision (Justice Field abstained), the Supreme Court ruled on April 14, 1890, that Neagle "was acting under the authority of the law of the United States, and was justified in so doing; and that he is not liable to answer in the courts of California on account of his part in that transaction." Defending judges is a duty of an officer of the court and does not require a specific statute.

The ruling "In re Neagle (Cunningham v. Neagle)", on the supremacy of federal law over state law (135 U.S. 1; 10 S. Ct. 658; 34 L. Ed. 55 (1890)) found that the President, as the source of all Executive authority, could act in the absence of specific statutory authority since there were no laws that provided for protection of federal judges by the Executive branch. Constitutionally, the decision determined that the Executive branch exercised its own "necessary and proper" authority.

== Later life ==
After his defense of Justice Field, Neagle found himself in demand as a bodyguard for high officials, including H. E. Huntington of the Southern Pacific. In early August, 1896, while protecting Huntington, he prevented a former employee named A. J. Collins from talking with Huntington. According to James H. Barry, the editor of the San Francisco Star, Neagle grabbed Collins "from behind, seized him by the throat and threw him into the street." Barry had previously attacked Neagle for his "cold-blooded murder" of Terry. He wrote, "That infernal miscreant Neagle, who murdered Judge Terry at Judge Field's instance, and who should long since have dangled on the gallows, is now, it appears, employed as hired villain by the Southern Pacific." The newspaper depicted Neagle's confrontation with Collins in large type on its front page, titled Murderer Neagle Still On Deck. Neagle confronted Barry on Montgomery Street in San Francisco, spitting at him, withdrawing a pistol from this pocket, and twirling it at his side, apparently intending to provoke Barry. Barry, forewarned, did nothing.

Neagle also guarded Patrick Calhoun of the United Railroad. Senator William Stewart hired him as a bodyguard during his 1887 campaign for reelection in Nevada. Neagle also worked as a special investigator for prominent criminal lawyer Earl Rogers. However, his interest in mining activity never lagged. As late as 1912, when he was 65 years old, he held a job as mine superintendent in California's Tuolumne County.

He died on November 28, 1925, at age 78 in Oakland, California.
