= Fred Bell =

Fred Bell may refer to:

- Fred Bell (heir) (1875-1934), American millionaire heir
- Fred Bell (rugby union) (1876-1947), English international rugby union player
- Fred Bell (footballer), (1877-1928), English footballer, see List of Bury F.C. players (1–24 appearances)
- Fred Bell (baseball) (1902-1936), American baseball pitcher

== See also ==
- Frederick Bell (disambiguation)
