= Thomas Bell (capitalist) =

Scottish-American investor and banker (1822–1892)

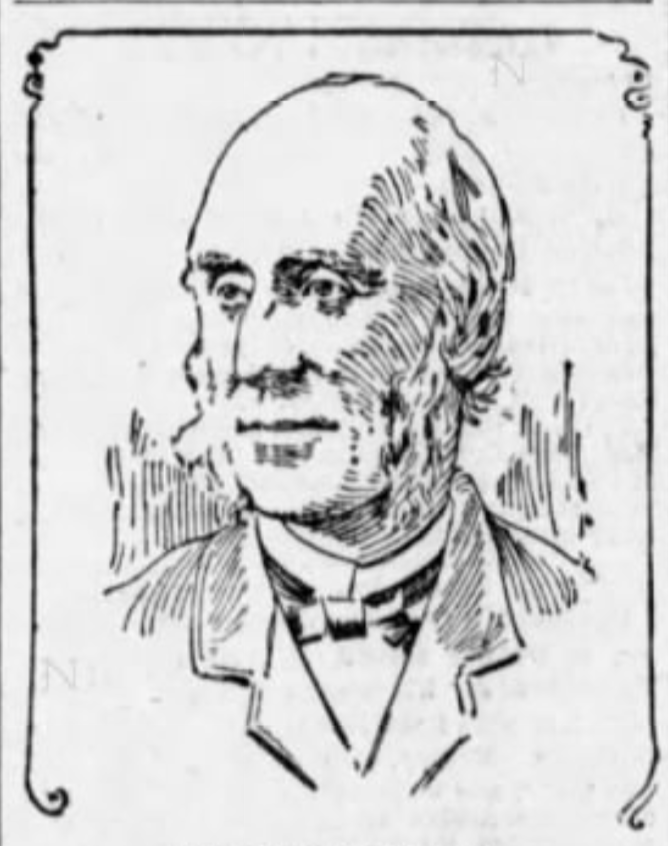
Thomas Bell, capitalist, died October 16, 1892

Thomas Bell (1822–October 16, 1892) was a Scottish-American capitalist. He was an investor, banker, and co-founder of the Bank of California. He began his career with Barron, Forbes & Company as a clerk in Tepic, Mexico, he later became partner and then owner of the house, which was renamed to Thomas Bell & Company. He took on a partner, George Staacke in 1879. Bell was the director of the California Bank by 1875. He entered into a lucrative, yet boundary crossing and entwined, relationship with Mary Ellen Pleasant that may have complicated Bell's personal life, while it also helped manage family relationships. After his death the relationship with Pleasant resulted in a years-long lawsuit filed by his wife against Pleasant.

== Early life ==
Bell was born in the Highlands of Scotland in 1822. He was also said to have been a native of Dundee, Scotland. He sailed from London for Valparaíso, Chile when he was 18 years old. (Note: He is said to have come to the United States when he was 25 years old by the San Francisco Examiner.)

== Career ==
He became a clerk at Chile's largest commission house, where relatives were employed. (Note: He was said by the Examiner to have sailed from New York in 1849 for Mexico.) He went to Tepic, Mexico in 1849 where he worked for Barron, Forbes & Company as a clerk. Next known as Bolton, Barron & Company, it was located in London and had branches in Mexico, South America, and San Francisco. The Tepic house was a branch office that conducted general banking and commission business in Mexico and South America. It also controlled the Almaden quicksilver mines (now the site of New Almaden).

Bell settled in San Francisco in 1851, at the height of the California Gold Rush (1848–1855), (Note: Without mentioning Tepic, he was said by the San Francisco Examiner to have come to San Francisco in early 1850, returned to Valparaíso for a year, and then settled in San Francisco.) or in 1856, after having worked in Mexico. The firm name had changed by that time to Bolton, Barron & Company and he located in the city to help manage the office that was located at Merchant and Montgomery Streets. It focused on local mercantile, financial, and mining businesses, including the Comstock Lode, and founded the old bank of California. He became a partner by 1871 and, in 1871 or later, he bought out the other interests and owned the company outright and renamed it Thomas Bell & Company. Bell operated the business by himself until May 1, 1879 when he brought in George Staacke, a fellow clerk in their younger days, to be his partner. Bell was the director the California Bank by 1875. He moved his corporate Thomas Bell & Company office to the upper floors of the California Bank building after it was constructed.

Bell invested in numerous California enterprises during its early American pioneer years, including ventures in silver, quicksilver, and quartz mining, as well as in railroads and real estate. His investments were located in the United States and its Territories and Mexico. Bell entered into a partnership with a widow and philanthropist Mary Ellen Pleasant, making investments and establishing businesses that made her $30 million (equivalent to $879,545,455 in 2025) by 1875. She put most of her investments in Bell's name, because it would have been harder for a black woman to have managed the transactions on her own. She had two strikes against her at the time: she was a rich woman and she was rich black person, the latter of which made it very difficult to ensure the safety of her fortune.

He and Darius Ogden Mills were responsible for managing the bank collapse of 1875 and depositors demands for money. They made arrangements with the Rothchilds and other European bankers to secure $3 million equivalent to $87,954,545 in 2025 to keep the bank open. The collapse brought him in contact with William Sharon, who became notorious during the Sharon v. Sharon trial. A lawsuit was filed by Sarah Althea Hill who claimed to have been his wife. Her legal fees were paid by Pleasant, and since their finances has become co-mingled, Bell was accused of being involved in the suit as well. Bell and Sharon were unable to repair the damage to their relationship. Bell retired from the daily activities of the bank after the bank's collapse, but remained on the Board of Directors through 1877 per San Francisco Chronicle notices.

=== Santa Barbara property ===
Bell had a close relationship with his nephew John S. Bell during most of the time that they were both alive. Thomas owned a large tracts of land, primarily farm land, in Santa Barbara County that were managed by John. From the start, Thomas expressed that John was due a portion of the profits and any monies earned from selling off some of the acreage. John was led to believe that he would receive the land upon Thomas' death.

== Personal life ==
=== Marriage ===
Bell was a decades-long bachelor when Pleasant introduced him to Teresa Percy Hoey, who had been one of her "protégés". (Note: Pleasant helped women get established in San Francisco with housing and clothing. She advised them about how to carry themselves and dress. She arranged marriages, too.) Teresa's maiden name was Harris and she was a widow when she married Bell.

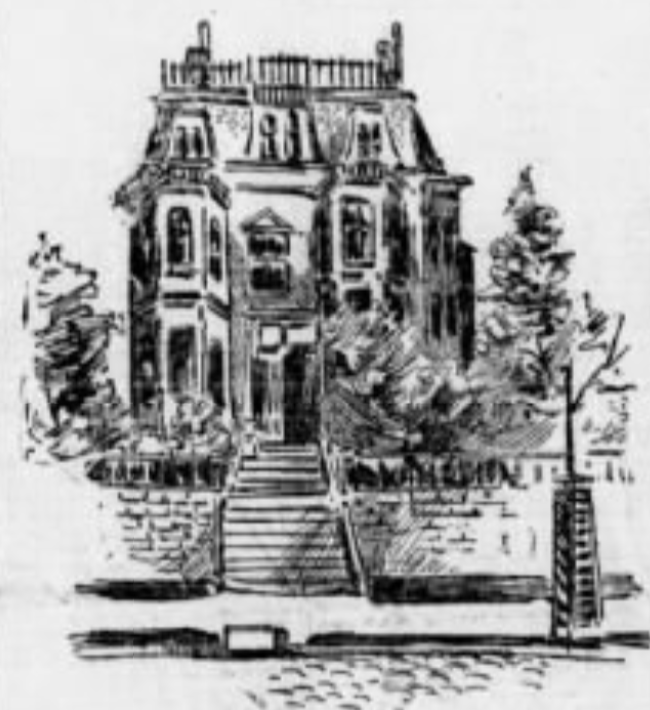
Home of Mary Ellen Pleasant and Thomas Bell's family, 1861 Octavia, San Francisco, California

Thomas and Teresa were said to have married a few months after they met in 1879. They lived at a 30-room mansion in San Francisco that was built and furnished by Pleasant by 1880. (Note: Thomas, his wife Teresa, and three children lived in the residence with Pleasant, eight servants, and a five-year-old child. The Bells had three children at that time: Frederick, Mary Terressa and Viola S. Bell.) There was an air of mystery about life in the mansion, much of it having to do with the unusual relationship between Pleasant and the Bells.

After their marriage, the Bells lived separate lives, and much of Teresa's life was controlled by Pleasant. Teresa has been thought to be mentally ill, with the Bell children calling her insane. Besides overseeing housekeeping and managing the servants, Pleasant selected Teresa's clothes and social activities and controlled the disbursement of money. She also mediated between Bell and his wife. Pleasant was described as the housekeeper of the mansion, but she built the mansion. Because she controlled the activities at the residence, and turned away visitors, Bell's friends and acquaintances were discouraged from calling on them at the mansion. Teresa had a full social life before her marriage, which was significantly curtailed afterwards.

Thomas and Teresa had a difficult marriage. Teresa and her five youngest children moved to the Beltane ranch about 1889. Frederick remained with his father in the mansion on Octavia Street. Teresa, concerned about being a poor widow, negotiated that Thomas Bell would leave at least $50,000 (equivalent to $1,791,667 in 2025) for each of the children he fathered. He considered options for disbursement of his estate and even though he felt he had been wronged by Teresa, he decided that the best option would be one that would not involve a long trial contesting the will, which would have been hard on the children.

=== Children ===
The couple had six children. Four of the children are consistently in the will and Supreme Court case:

- Thomas Frederick "Fred" Bell (born May 10, 1875, baptized on December 8, 1875) (Note: Both Thomas Frederick and Mary Teresa were on a baptismal records, with both Teresa and Thomas' names on the baptismal record.) on the 1880 Federal Census. He was also in the will, the Supreme Court paperwork, and the 1926 final estate decree.
- Muriel Bell Hoster is listed in the will and the Supreme Court paperwork, and the 1926 final estate decree.
- Reginald Bell is listed in the will the Supreme Court paperwork. and the 1926 final estate decree.
- Eustice or Eustace Bell (deceased by 1926) was in the will, the Supreme Court paperwork, and the 1926 final estate decree.

The following are females listed in some of the records:

- Mary Teresa Bell, also known as Marie, (born March 26, 1876, baptized on June 16, 1877) on the 1880 Federal Census. She is in the will.
- Rebecca Bell was listed on the will.
- Robina Bell Hessel in the Supreme Court paperwork and the 1926 final estate decree.

During the trials that involved Teresa Bell, questions about when Thomas and Theresa met and whether each of the children were the biological children of both Teresa and Thomas. Initially, Teresa claimed that she was a widow who had two children, Fred and Marie. In 1897, she stated that she was married to Thomas Bell in 1878, but there were baptismal certificates for Mary T. Bell from 1877 with both Thomas and Teresa Bell on the certificate. In court testimony she also said that the children were not born to her. She saw them, saw that they were in need, and took them in. From the court testimony, Teresa stated she had no other names than Harris, Percy and Hoey. However, the baptismal record for Mary (Marie) refers to Teresa Bell as formerly Clingham. Frederick stated that he had been told that his parents were married in 1874 in New York.

=== Interests ===
He was known as a man of integrity with few close friends, but whom he would "go further the almost any one else" to help them in their time of need. He was a member of the Pacific-Union Club, where many of his friends were members. He was a good friend of Captain I. W. Lees, the chief of the city's police detectives. They first met in 1849 in Tepic, Mexico to explore investment opportunities. He and his family also had a ranch in Sonoma County, where Teresa and her children would stay for extended periods. He was charitable, without wanting his donations announced, and was said to have never turned down a deserving poor person.

== Death ==
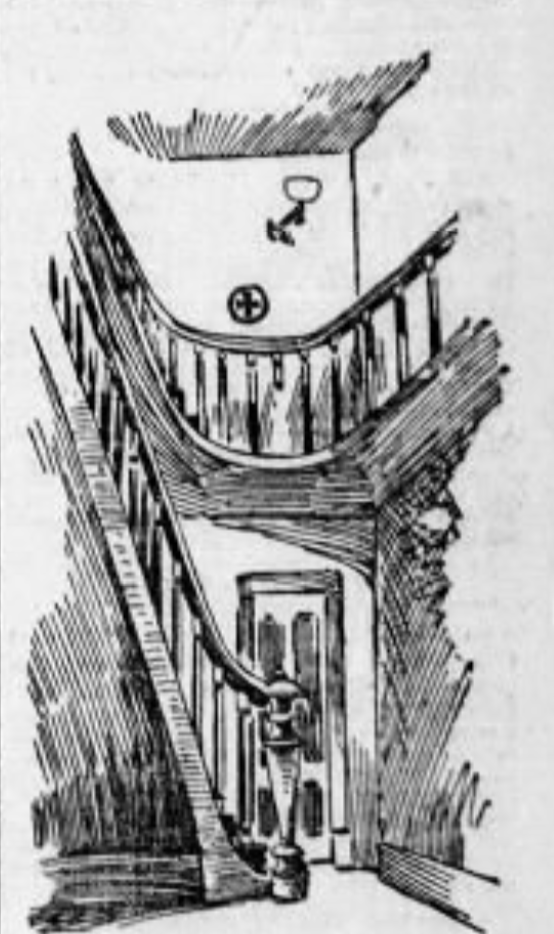
Staircase of the Pleasant-Bell Mansion where Thomas Bell fell about twenty feet from the back first floor landing (x on the image) down to the basement floor and died October 16, 1892.

Bell was ill for two months with a skin disease and other ailments (Note: The Chronicle stated that and he was attended to by Pleasant alone.) before the night of October 16, 1892. He fell down the rear stairs of the mansion in a state of confusion. He sustained severe brain and other injuries and died within several hours. An inquest was held on October 18, with testimony by two attending physicians, and it was ruled that he died of a concussion due to an accident. He was buried at Laurel Hill Cemetery and it was said that he was buried in a grave plot owned by Pleasant.

== Estate ==
At the time of his death, Bell was estimated to have a fortune of $1 or $2 million. In his will, Bell conveyed that a trust was established to manage the assets from his estate. The principal was managed by George Staacke, Henry Pichoir, and John W. C. Maxwell, based upon their expertise, with the income divided in thirds. One third went to Teresa for expenses for her and the children, another third to Teresa to use as she wished, and the last third to be split up equally among the children to use as they wished. He stated in the will that the estate included all that he had amassed before his marriage to Teresa.

Viola Smith Bell (born around 1874) was on the 1880 census, and tried to claim that she was the Bell's daughter in a Supreme Court ruling. By May 1926, she was taken care of out of court and had dropped her case.

After hearing the will, and that he was not mentioned in the will, John S. Bell contented to his friends that he believed he was the only living natural heir to the estate. John had a number of sources, he said, who could vouch for his uncle's intention to leave the ranches in Santa Barbara County to him. If John's contention that he was the only living natural heir was true, it meant that Thomas had not fathered any of Teresa's six children. John won the case against Thomas Bell's estate on October 26, 1897, giving him the 10,000 acres Los Alamos Ranch, worth around $300,000 (~$9.7 million in 2024). To receive ownership of the property, he had to resolve a debt of $110,000 due to the estate. (Note: In what may be a related issue: In 1895, John was arranging for the lease of three properties in Santa Barbara: Bell Ranch (also known as Canda de Los Armos), Belden Ranch, and Bella Mar for a total of about 1,000 acres.) Final payments from the estate were made on or around June 8, 1917, with Teresa gaining control of the large estate.

His widow Teresa sued to gain control of Pleasant's investment that were in Thomas Bell's name. She was determined to seek retribution for acts that she believed Pleasant to have committed. Without evidence required to charge her of illegal acts, she fought her in court.

Teresa Bell died on August 11, 1922. Her will was contested by her children, claiming that she was of unsound mind.

In 1923, John S. Bell inherited $100,000 from Teresa Bell's estate.
