= Mary Ellen Pleasant =

American entrepreneur, financier, real estate magnate and abolitionist (1815–1904)

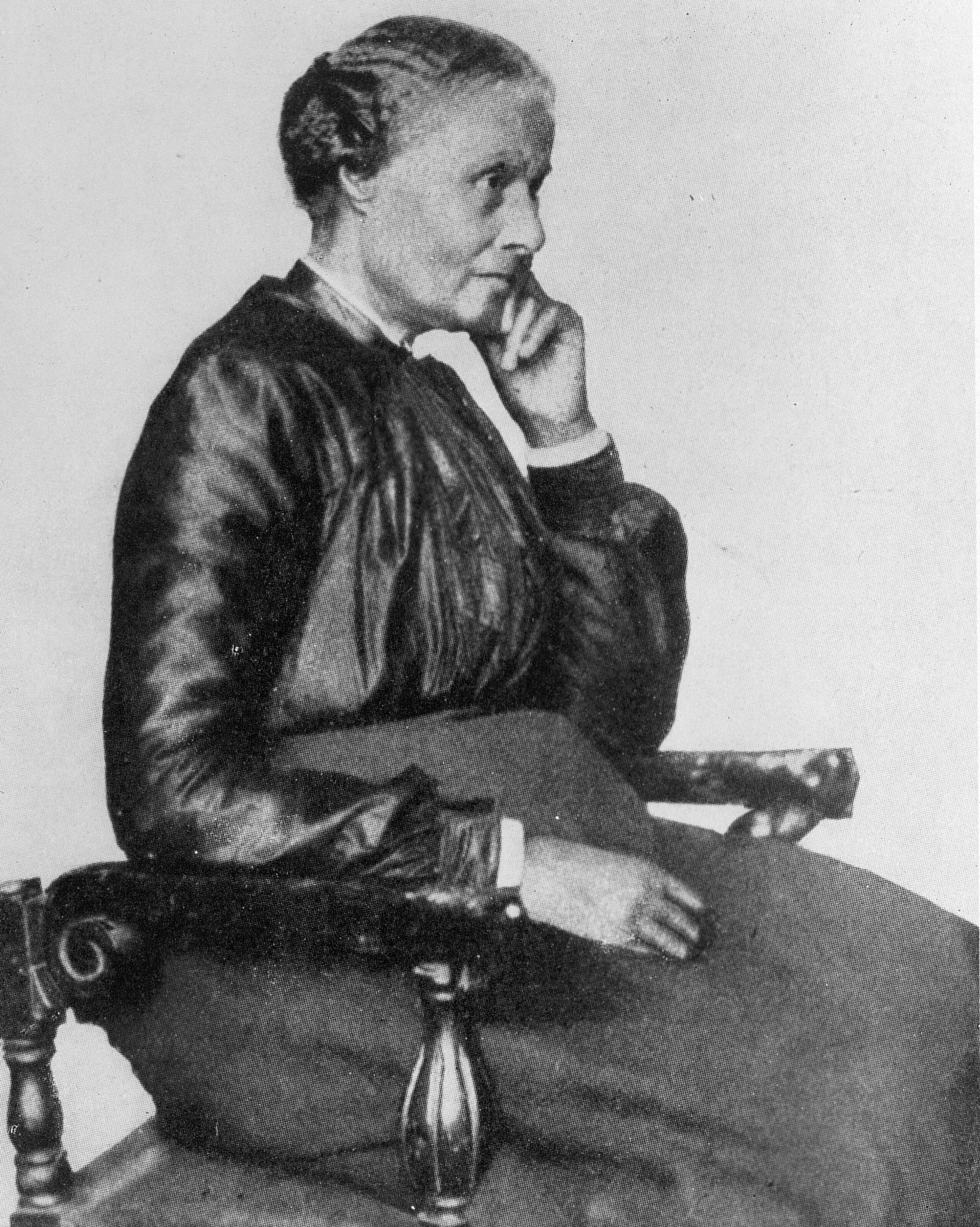
- Born: August 19, c. 1814 (Note: There are different accounts about her origins. Pleasant has said that she was born free on August 19, 1814, in Pennsylvania (1890 census taker), "in Barley Street" in Philadelphia (interview), or born at "9 Barley Street in Philadelphia." (her memoir). She has also said that she was born in 1812. Her father was said to have been a Cherokee Indian, a Kanaka / Hawaiian merchant, or a white slave holder. Her mother was "a full-blooded Louisiana negress" or a Georgia voodoo queen. In her memoirs, she stated that her mother's name was Mary, but she knew very little about her. She also stated that her parents were a Caribbean voodoo priestess and a wealthy planter from Virginia. There are reports that she was born a slave from 1814 to 1817 in Georgia, one account stating that she was born in Augusta, Georgia in 1817 to a son of a Virginian governor and a Haitian slave. Based upon a date of death of January 11, 1904, at the age of 89 years, 4 months, and 22 days of age, her date of birth is August 20, 1814.); Georgia, Virginia, or Philadelphia, Pennsylvania, U.S.
- Died: January 11, 1904 (Note: She is said to have died on January 4. Her death is officially recorded as January 11, 1904 In addition, as a cross-check of date of birth and death: A date of death of January 11, 1904, at the age of 89 years, 4 months, and 22 days of age, means her date of birth is August 19/20, 1814.); San Francisco, California, U.S.
- Known for: Entrepreneur, financier, real estate magnate, abolitionist

Mary Ellen Pleasant (August 19, 1814 – January 11, 1904) was an American entrepreneur, financier, real estate magnate and abolitionist. She was arguably the first self-made millionaire of African-American heritage, preceding Madam C. J. Walker by decades.

She identified herself as "a capitalist by profession" in the 1890 United States census. Her aim was to earn as much money as she was able to help as many people as she could. With her riches she was able to provide transportation, housing, and food for survival. She trained people how to stay safe, succeed, carry themselves, and more. The "one woman social agency" served African Americans before and during the Civil War, as well as meeting a different set of needs after Lincoln's Emancipation Proclamation.

She worked on the Underground Railroad and expanded it westward during the California Gold Rush era. She was a friend and financial supporter of John Brown and was well known among abolitionists. She helped women who lived in California during the California Gold Rush to stay safe and become self-sufficient. After the Civil War, she won several civil rights victories that resulted in her being called "The Mother of Human Rights in California". Legal battles, though, had mixed results.

Realizing that she was in a tenuous position as a black woman who had gained political and financial power, she sought ways to blend in to the culture of the times. She portrayed herself as a housekeeper and a cook, long after she was wealthy, but she used these roles to get to know wealthy citizens and gain information for her investments. In the 1870s, she made the acquaintance of Thomas Bell, a wealthy banker and capitalist, which helped her make money and keep her riches and true financial status a secret. She spent her money, and developed the plans, to build a large mansion that outwardly was to seem as if it was the Bells' residence. She assumed the role of housekeeper for the Bells, but it was not a secret in the city that she actually ran the household, managed the servants, and also managed the relationships among the Bells.

Author Edward White said of her: "As an entrepreneur, civil-rights activist, and benefactor, Mary Ellen Pleasant made a name and a fortune for herself in Gold Rush–era San Francisco, shattering racial taboos."

== Early life ==
Pleasant was likely born on August 19, 1814. There are various accounts about where she was born, who her parents were, and if she was born free or not. She claimed that she was born free in Philadelphia on Barley Street. Others state that she was born into slavery in Georgia or Virginia. She may have been the daughter of a voodoo priestess from the Caribbean, a Hawaiian merchant, or a wealthy Virginian. It was said that she had so many stories about her origins to "please her audience or justify her behavior."

After her mother disappeared when she was a child, she lived with Mr. and Mrs. Williams and was known as Mary Ellen Williams. When she was six (Note: In her memoir, Pleasant said that she went to Nantucket at age six.) or eleven years of age, she was taken from a household in Philadelphia or Cincinnati. Mr. Williams brought her to Nantucket, Massachusetts, to be a domestic or indentured servant to the Hussey-Gardner family, who were Quakers and abolitionists. (Note: She is also said to have been a bond servant, but money was left for her care. Other than the conflicting information from two sources, there is nothing found to clarify if she was brought on as an indentured servant or bonded servant.) He left some money for her education with the Husseys, yet Pleasant did not get a formal education. She later said, "I often wonder what I would have been with an education." (Note: Madam Neergaard stated, [If she] had been a man and well-educated, she would have been a general or a statesman.) Pleasant stated in her memoir that she was brought to Nantucket by her father, but she had no memories of life before Nantucket or why she went there.

Mrs. Hussey in her shop sold everything from fish hooks to a ton of coal... Buying wholesale and selling retail was the way she did it and it paid. I was finally placed in the store as a clerk, and I could make change and talk to a dozen people all at once and never make a mistake, and I could remember all the accounts and at the end of the day she could put them down, and they would always be right as I remembered them.

— Mary Ellen Pleasant, quoted in Agency: Married Women Traders of Nantucket 1765-1865

When she arrived, c. 1820, Nantucket was in the "golden era of Nantucket whaling." As she grew up, she worked in the Husseys' store. Located on Union Street, it was run by Mary Hussey, (Note: She may have been Deborah or Mary Hussey, the latter of whom advertised her store in Nantucket newspapers in the 1820s.) whom she called "Grandma Hussey". Hussey was the grandmother of Phebe Hussey Gardner, who was married to Captain Edward W. Gardner, a whaler. Pleasant sought to create a better life for herself by focusing on learning what she could from her surroundings. Working at the store helped her develop a friendly manner and business acumen. She said of that time: "I was a girl full of smartness [who] let books alone and studied men and women a good deal … I have always noticed that when I have something to say, people listen. They never go to sleep on me." She was considered a member of the family by 1839 when she was taken into the home of abolitionists Phebe Hussey Gardner and Edward Gardner. Their son Thomas Gardner taught her how to read and write. She left Nantucket c. 1840. Thenceforth she exchanged letters with Phebe Gardner and Ariel Hussey until they died. Phebe and her husband Edward were lost at sea in 1863, and Ariel was also dead by that time. (Note: They sailed the Anita near the Polynesian Friendly Islands during a hurricane on January 11, 1863. The ship was driven ashore and found empty. All the passengers were believed to have perished, including Captain Edward W. Gardner and his wife.)

== The Underground Railroad ==
Female abolitionists often were accused of overstepping the bonds of appropriate behavior. The actions of female reformers and abolitionists… roused public opinion and placed their private as well as public lives under scrutiny.

— Lynn Maria Hudson, author of The Making of "Mammy Pleasant"

Pleasant was an apprentice for a tailor in Boston on Merrimac Street, and she may have met her first husband in the shop. She married James Smith in Boston in the 1840s. (Note: There are many stories of who Smith may have been. He was said by Hudson to be James Smith, a tobacco plantation owner in Charles Town, West Virginia, as well as a merchant and land-owner, owning land near Harper's Ferry, and a widower with a daughter named Emma. She stated that she married James Henry Smith, "a foreman carpenter and contractor," from Philadelphia, "who had a good business and possessed considerable means." His name is also stated to be James W. Smith or Alexander Smith. He was said to be part Cuban, or to be able to pass as Cuban. Pleasant stated that a governor of a Southern state brought a black or mixed race woman and their children, who were fair enough to pass as whites, to Ohio. After learning trades, the sons settled in northern free states, including Pennsylvania.) Her husband was an abolitionist, and together they helped people who had been enslaved make it north to freedom in Nova Scotia via the Underground Railroad. They coordinated transportation through contacts in Nantucket and New Bedford, Massachusetts, Ohio, and perhaps New Orleans. They were in danger from slavers, as well as subject to prosecution and imprisonment under the Fugitive Slave Act of 1793 and the later act of 1850 that imposed new penalties on those in the Underground Railroad.

Smith was an agent for The Liberator, an anti-slavery newspaper published by William Lloyd Garrison. Pleasant was likely to have attended Anti-Slavery Society meetings in Nantucket, led by Anna Gardner, during and after her marriage. Smith, who had been abusive to Pleasant, died after around four years of marriage. Pleasant was left an estate worth tens of thousands of dollars. She continued their work as a conductor on the Underground Railroad, for three or four years.

It was dangerous work and she was harassed for helping runaways and ultimately had to leave the east coast. Nonetheless, for this work and later acts, W.E.B. Du Bois classed her with Harriet Tubman as two " women who rose out of the black mass of slaves not only to guide their own folk but to influence the nation."

Pleasant claimed, in an autobiography partially dictated on her deathbed, to have been one of the financial backers of abolitionist John Brown's raid on Harpers Ferry. In her scholarly monograph on Pleasant's life, historian Lynn M. Hudson argues that there is adequate proof of the credibility of this claim. She and John Brown met together in Chatham, Ontario, a terminus of the Underground Railroad and a centre of abolitionist activism, in 1858 a year before the raid.

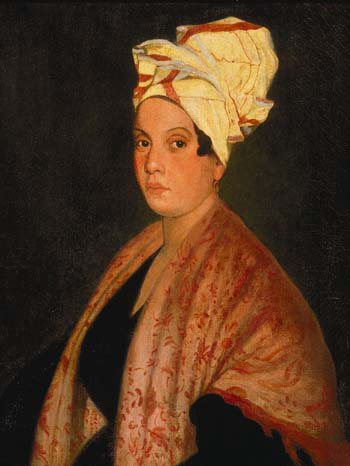
Frank Schneider, Portrait of Marie Laveau (1794–1881), 1920, Louisiana State Museum, New Orleans. Based on an 1835 painting by George Catlin. Pleasant is reputed to have learned about Louisiana Voodoo from Laveau.

During that time, she returned to Nantucket for a short period after her husband's death. Edward Gardner had helped transport fugitives to their freedom, and he helped Pleasant manage her husband's estate after his death.

At some point, Pleasant developed a relationship with John James Pleasants, (Note: His name was also spelled Pleasance and Plaissance.) who was a former slave. He had been the Creole foreman of her husband's plantation or a waiter in New Bedford, Massachusetts. They were married c. 1848. During their marriage, he worked as a cook-seaman. She had a baby daughter named Elizabeth "Lizzie" J. Smith in the late 1840s. Lizzie was likely left behind on the east coast as Pleasant established herself in San Francisco. Lizzie later made the journey west with Mrs. Martha Steele of Boston.

A number of fellow abolitionists from Boston, Philadelphia, and New Bedford migrated west to California c. 1850; More than 700 people, at least 25 of whom were Hussey and Gardner family members, left Nantucket for the gold coast in 1849. (Note: New Bedford had become the center of the whaling industry, and Nantucket suffered a fire in 1846, both of which made the Gold Rush appealing. When she arrived in California, she was reacquainted with many people she knew from the east coast.) She sailed on a ship to New Orleans, where she arranged for the flight of enslaved people, took cooking lessons, and was said to have taken lessons from Voodoo Queen Marie Laveau. Just as she was about to be arrested for her Underground Railroad feats, she returned to San Francisco in 1849, or in April 1852 on the steamer Oregon, after traveling through Panama. She left New Orleans . The voyage to California took about four months.

== California Gold Rush and civil rights ==
The California Gold Rush (1848–1855) provided a unique opportunity for Black people. As one African American miner wrote to his wife, "This is the best place for black folks on the globe. All a man has to do is to work, and he will make money." Many Black Americans were made rich through prospecting.

Since only one out of ten pioneers coming to the state were women, Pleasant realized that she could seize a very lucrative opportunity to cook and provide lodging for the miners. There was a wrinkle. American southerners also made a run for the Gold Coast, taking their enslaved people with them. There were slave catchers and slaveholders who came looking for runaways. Governor Peter Hardeman Burnett was such a southerner who wanted to eliminate all blacks from the state. In addition, there was a California law that allowed any black person to be sold into slavery if they did not have appropriate papers.

== Money-making ==
When she arrived in San Francisco, word had spread that she would be arriving in San Francisco and she was met by a group of men who got into a bidding war to engage her as a cook.

She is said to have had $15,000 (equivalent to $580,500 in 2025) in gold coins when she arrived in San Francisco. She managed her money cleverly. She exchanged gold into silver through Panama $1,000 at a time when the value of gold was high. She deposited silver into a bank, and took it out in gold, she said that she "was able to turn my money over rapidly". She put some of her money into a number of banks. She also divided money between a black Baptist minister, Thomas Randolph; William West of West & Harper, and Frank Langford with a 10% interest rate.

She worked as a live-in domestic and made investments based upon conversations that she overheard from wealthy men as she attended to them during meals and conferences. She established boarding houses, a string of laundries, and brothels. She was a co-founder of the Bank of California and she established several restaurants, including the Case and Heiser. John James Pleasant was a sea-cook, who was often at sea during their 30-year marriage. He worked with her for more than two decades as an abolitionist. He also worked in the fight against discrimination in the 1860s. He died in 1877.

=== Philanthropy, civil rights, and schemes ===
What a woman, what a shrewd, calculating, dominating, old drill sergeant-psychiatrist she must have been!

— Lerone Bennett Jr., Ebony

The more that she made, the more that she had to share to help people in need. For her own safety, she initially went by the name Mrs. Ellen Smith, rather than Pleasant, and was considered by her neighbors to be a white landlady and cook. She was Mrs. Pleasant to former slaves who worked at any of her businesses, which included livery stables, a dairy farm, a tenant farm, and a money-lending business. She was careful to keep her name out of Underground Railroad–related transactions; however, among other abolitionists, she was known as Mrs. Pleasant(s). Among the transactions that she made during Underground Railroad activities, she assisted fugitive slaves in obtaining safe transportation, housing, and jobs. She funded her efforts through the monies that she had left from her first husband's estate.

When she came to California, it was possible for fugitive slaves to be apprehended from other states and blacks who were unable to give testimony in courts. She became a "one woman social agency" that provided for the transportation of black men and women to California. Once there, she ensured their daily needs were met until they were employed or had established businesses, both of which she helped them accomplish. She helped William Marcus West establish a boarding house that doubled as a safe house for runaways as was her house, and that of wealthy white home owners. She helped enslaved people, who traveled with their owners, to escape while in California.

She attained legal resources for black people when attempts were made to extradite them out of California and return them to slavery. For instance, she paid for legal fees and housing for Archy Lee during his case of 1857, in which a judge from Texas ultimately ruled against California's state constitution and for the slaveholder. Since testimony of African Americans was not allowed in court, she worked and funded the repeal of the banned-testimony law. She campaigned for the end of slavery in the state. She became known as the "Mother of civil rights in California" for her efforts.

She helped women of any ethnicity, who were at significant risk on their own in the early San Franciscan days, by helping them with housing and clothing, as well as advising them about how to carry themselves and dress. She also helped women find homes for their children, if they could not support them. She arranged marriages between wealthy men and her "protégés", who kept detailed records about the men's activities—illegitimate children, infidelities, and political and financial shenanigans—which may have been used for blackmail.

== Harper's Ferry ==
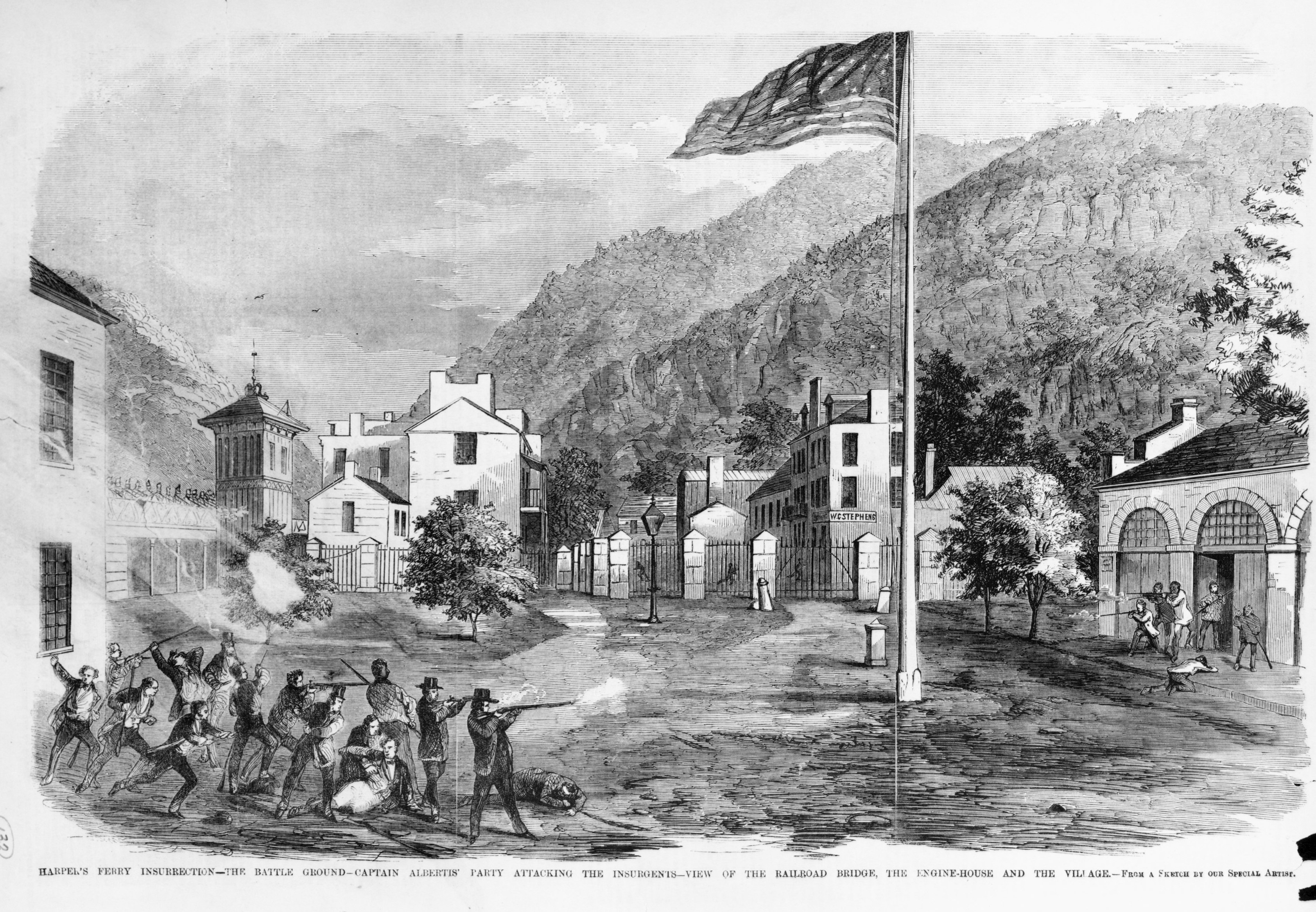
Battleground of the Harper's Ferry insurrection, with Captain E. G. Alburtis' party attacking the insurgents, wood engraving, November 5, 1859, Frank Leslie's Illustrated Newspaper.

She left San Francisco from 1857 to 1859 to help John Brown. She claimed to have actively supported his cause with money and work. There was a note from her in his pocket when he was arrested after the Harpers Ferry Armory incident, but as it was only signed with the initials "MEP" (which were misread as "WEP") she was not caught. She returned to San Francisco to continue her work there, where she was known as the "Black City Hall."

When Brown was hanged on December 2, 1859, for murder and treason, a note found in his pocket read, "The ax is laid at the foot of the tree. When the first blow is struck, there will be more money to help." Officials most likely believed it was written by a wealthy Northerner who had helped fund Brown's attempt to incite, and arm, an enormous slave uprising by taking over an arsenal at Harpers Ferry in Virginia. No one suspected that the note was written by Pleasant.

Pleasant told Davis, "Before I pass away, I wish to clear the identity of the party who furnished John Brown with most of his money to start the fight at Harpers Ferry and who signed the letter found on him when he was arrested." The sum she donated was $30,000 (equivalent to $1,075,000 in 2025). She has said that it was the "most important and significant act of her life".

== Post-war life ==
Here was a colored woman who became one of the shrewdest business minds of the State. She anticipated the development in oil; she was the trusted confidante of many of the California pioneers… and for years was a power in San Francisco affairs.

— W. E. B. Du Bois

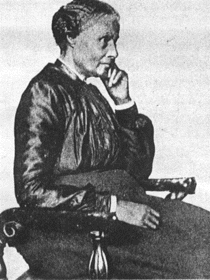
Mary Ellen Pleasant

With her fortune and the exorbitant money she made as a cook, ten times what she could have made in the East, she invested in a number of businesses in California that served the miners, like laundries, lodging, and Wells Fargo. She developed a long-lasting partnership with Thomas Bell, a white banker and investor in the east. Her investments and businesses, made her and Thomas Bell $30 million (equivalent to $879,545,455 in 2025) by 1875. After the end of the war, she invested in the same types of businesses, but more luxurious accommodations, which drew the elite.

After the end of the war, she began to identify herself as a woman of color, such as in the city directory. She stopped working as a housekeeper to have more time to spend on civil rights activities, including housing for blacks, establishing black schools, and repealing or fighting against Jim Crow laws. She established a 1,000-acre ranch in Sonoma County called Beltane Ranch (now Calabazas Creek Open Space Preserve) in 1890 and 1891.

In the spring of 1865, her daughter Lizzie married R. Berry Phillips at the African Methodist Episcopal (A.M.E.) Zion Church in San Francisco followed by a reception. (Pleasant herself was Catholic.)

== Legal cases ==
=== Streetcar lawsuits ===
Pleasant successfully attacked racial discrimination in San Francisco public conveyances after she and two other black women were ejected from a city streetcar in 1866. She filed two lawsuits. The first, against the Omnibus Railroad Company, was withdrawn after the company promised to allow African-Americans to board their streetcars. The second case, Pleasant v. North Beach & Mission Railroad Company, went to the California Supreme Court and took two years to complete. In the city, the case outlawed segregation in the city's public conveyances. Pleasant won the case and was awarded $500 by the jury, in part due to the eye-witness testimony of Lisette Woodworth, a white woman who had hired Pleasant, who the woman called "Mamma", for domestic work years ago. Although the woman saw Pleasant as a friend, their relationship and the use of the endearment, "Mamma" was twisted in the newspapers. At the State Supreme Court, the damages awarded to Pleasant at the trial court were reversed, having been found excessive.

The publicity of this case highlighted her differences from others: a woman of mixed ancestry, who lived her life boldly before her time, and who had a significant change in class from the time of her birth. Pleasant was regularly called the derogatory slur "Mammy Pleasant" by local whites. The press also called her "Mammy" Pleasant but she did not approve: "I don't like to be called mammy by everybody. Put. that. down. I am not mammy to everybody in California. I received a letter from a pastor in Sacramento. It was addressed to Mammy Pleasant. I wrote back to him on his own paper that my name was Mrs. Mary E. Pleasant. I wouldn't waste any of my paper on him."

=== Sharon v. Sharon ===
A lawsuit between Sarah Althea Hill and Senator William Sharon involved the breakup of their arrangement and whether there were damages. They had a contractual relationship in which Sharon agreed to pay $500 each month to her so that they could sleep together from time to time. Hill and Pleasant understood it as marriage contract (kept secret for political and other reasons) and that now Sharon wanted to be rid of her. Pleasant paid Hill's legal fees. David Terry was one of her lawyers who became emotionally involved in the case.

Pleasant was accused by Sharon's lawyer and the press of having sinister intentions and manipulating Hill to drum up the case. The trial received national attention in the press, much of which was unpleasant. There were unsubstantiated claims that Pleasant tried to poison Sharon's food and cast spells over him. She was presumed to have an evil intention for listening to Hill's concerns, as if "confiding one's secrets in a mammy was simply what well-brought-up white ladies do." When she was called to the stand Pleasant was "articulate, measured, and consistent", not overly kindly nor evil as she had been portrayed.

Ultimately Justice Stephen J. Field ruled for Sharon. By this time Hill had married David Terry, who went into a rage at the verdict and was sentenced to six months in jail. In August 1889, Terry was killed by a bodyguard that Justice Field had hired for protection.

Although there are some reports that this destroyed Pleasant's reputation, within San Francisco she was still respected and remembered fondly for her efforts. The number of friends dwindled over the years as some moved out of town and others were dead. The culture of the city had changed quite a bit from the pioneering days when Pleasant was a force to be reckoned with.

== Later life with the Bell family ==
Pleasant lived the last 20 years of her life in a 30-room mansion that spanned two San Francisco city blocks. In 1880, she had fifteen people living in her house. There were five members of Thomas Bell's family, including his wife Terressa (or Teresa) Bell, and their children Frederick, Mary Terressa and Viola S. Bell. Aside from herself, the rest were servants (including two Black men and a young Native American couple) and a five-year-old boy. (Note: Pleasant's detractors claimed that her partnership with Bell was illicit and that the mansion she built for them in San Francisco was used as a brothel. There were also rumors that damaged Pleasant's reputation. "Story has it that Mammy kept the feeble, near-senile Bell a prisoner in his mansion at the corner of Octavia and Bush, and that she fed his children dog meat and stale bread.") While the Bells and Pleasant lived together, Pleasant controlled the combined Bell and Pleasant money. If Teresa wanted money, she asked Pleasant for the money, who thought about it and, if the request seemed reasonable, she checked in with Thomas Bell for his reaction. After Thomas Bell died in 1892, the cumulation of events meant that she had lost most of her estate. She still had her investments, but she was cash-poor, and the courts declared that Pleasant was insolvent. That same year, she had donated today's equivalent of about $10,000 to help found Saint Mary's College.

Teresa, who had emotional and mental instability, claimed that tens of thousands of dollars had been stolen by Pleasant and that her husband had been manipulated. When the case went to trial it was difficult to discern what were Bell's and what were Pleasant's assets, because the transactions were so entwined. Pleasant could show that she paid for construction of her mansion, but she left it either because it was ruled that ownership should be transferred to Teresa or Pleasant complied with Teresa's request for her to leave the house in 1899. As soon as she made arrangements, she moved into a six-room apartment on Webster Street and began a legal crusade of her own to recover her property, including a diamond collection. The case was not settled by the time of Pleasant's death.

Pleasant lived on Webster Street in San Francisco with a maid. She was visited by the Bell children there. They called her "Auntie" and she called them "Dear". She turned down an offer by a reporter to pay generously for her stories of people from the past, because she said she would never betray her friends.

== Death ==
Pleasant became quite weakened and near death and a friend, Olive Sherwood, took her to her house, the Lyman Sherwood residence on Filbert Street. She died there on January 11, 1904, and was interred at Tulocay Cemetery in Napa, California. Her gravesite is marked with a metal sculpture and the site was dedicated on June 11, 2011, and her gravestone contains the words "She was a friend of John Brown", as she had requested before her death. Her former mansion was demolished and has been replaced by the Mary Ellen Pleasant Memorial Park.

== Posthumous recognition ==
Pleasant has been featured or mentioned in several works of fiction. Michelle Cliff's 1993 book Free Enterprise is subtitled "A Novel of Mary Ellen Pleasant" and features her abolitionist activities. The ghost of Mary Ellen Pleasant is a character in the 1997 novel Earthquake Weather, by Tim Powers. Karen Joy Fowler's historical novel Sister Noon, published in 2001, features Pleasant as a central character, and Thomas Bell and Teresa Bell as secondary characters. She was an important character in Andre Norton's Velvet Shadows, a romantic suspense novel set in San Francisco. The American composer, David Garner, wrote an opera, based on her life and experiences, called Mary Pleasant at Land's End, which was workshopped at the San Francisco Conservatory of Music in 2017.

Pleasant's life has also been discussed in film and television, including in the 2008 documentary Meet Mary Pleasant, and a segment of a 2013 episode of the Comedy Central series Drunk History in which Pleasant was portrayed by Lisa Bonet.

In 1974, the city of San Francisco designated eucalyptus trees that Pleasant had planted outside her mansion at the southwest corner of Octavia and Bush streets in San Francisco as a Structure of Merit. The trees and associated plaque are now known as Mary Ellen Pleasant Memorial Park, which is the smallest park in San Francisco. Her burial site has been designated a "Network to Freedom" site by the National Park Service. Pleasant Street on Nob Hill is named for her.

== See also ==
- List of people associated with the California Gold Rush
