= Fred J. Dodge =

American detective and cattleman

- Born: August 24, 1854; Butte County, California
- Died: December 16, 1938 (aged 84); Boerne, Texas
- Occupation: Lawman
- Known for: Wells Fargo detective; Constable, Tombstone, Arizona

Frederick J. Dodge (August 29, 1854 — December 16, 1938) was an undercover Wells Fargo detective, a constable in Tombstone, Arizona, and a Texas cattleman. He was born in Spring Valley in northern Butte County, California, and was raised in Sacramento.

As a young man, Dodge learned to drive two-, four-, and six-horse hitches, and "fast freight handling fruit into the mining camps." He kept a store and managed a railroad eatery for his parents, but he was "lonesome for the mountains and the excitement of the mining camps", he later wrote. Dodge moved around, including to Pioche, Nevada, and Bodie, California, and met notable individuals in the mining camps, including David Neagle, Pat Holland, and Nellie Cashman.

He worked as undercover agent for Wells Fargo in California, Nevada, and Arizona. In December 1879, he was working in Tombstone, Arizona, and recommended that Wyatt Earp be hired as a guard and messenger for the stage line. The two quickly became good friends and Dodge supported Wyatt and his brothers in their troubles in Tombstone that led up to the Gunfight at the O.K. Corral and afterward. He was a personal friend of Wyatt and Virgil Earp and remained friends with them the rest of their lives. He was also a friend of lawman Heck Thomas. He was personally involved in the investigations that led to the demise of the Doolin and Dalton Gangs.

During the Earp Vendetta Ride, Earp borrowed a short, 22-inch, 10-gauge, double-barrel percussion shotgun from Dodge. Earp used it to kill Curly Bill Brocius in a shootout at Iron Springs on March 24, 1882. Some cowboy confederates disputed Brocius' death, and Dodge interviewed three participants afterward, confirming that Earp had killed Brocius.

Dodge used the shotgun throughout his 40-year career, and the gun was also registered to U.S. Marshal Heck Thomas. It passed through several owners. It was sold at auction in February, 2020, for $375,000.00.

He kept a daily diary of his life, a total of 27 volumes, which he used as the basis for the book on the Life and Times of Wyatt Earp. A book about the unvarnished recollections of Fred Dodge titled Undercover for Wells Fargo was edited by Carolyn Lake, who discovered Dodge's journals among Stuart N. Lake's papers. His diaries describe dozens of his cases, including stage robberies, train holdups, long pursuits across the badlands, and even a lawsuit against Wells Fargo for "delay to a corpse".

Fred Dodge and Morgan Earp looked alike, and when he first arrived on the stagecoach in Tombstone in 1879, Wyatt and Virgil promptly introduced themselves to the stranger who looked so much like their brother. Dodge posed as a gambler and none of the Earps initially knew he was a Wells Fargo agent. Dodge later teamed up with Heck Thomas to hunt down outlaws in Kansas and Oklahoma, and was personally involved in the investigations that led to the end of the Doolin and Dalton Gangs.
