= Jim Leavy =

Irish gunfighter in the American Old West

James H. Leavy
- Born: c. 1842; Dublin, Ireland
- Died: June 5, 1882; Tucson, Arizona
- Cause of death: gunshot wound

James H. Leavy (c. 1842 – June 5, 1882) was an Irish gunfighter in the Old West. He is remembered today by Western historians for participating in at least two instances of a quick draw duel. In his time, Leavy was one of the most notorious gunmen in the Old West known for challenging other gunmen to a duel. He is featured in the book Deadly Dozen, written by author Robert K. DeArment as one of the twelve most underrated gunmen of the 19th century West.

Historian Erik J. Wright notes that Leavy's name was in fact spelled "Leavy" as it was spelled this way on a number of primary documents from his time in Nevada and Arizona.

== Early life ==
Jim Leavy was born in Dublin, Ireland in about 1842. While some historians claim Leavy was of Jewish descent, no proof of this exists. All contemporary sources spell his name "Leavy." While he was young, his parents took him with them and immigrated to the United States.

== Known gunfights ==
=== First duel ===
By the spring of 1871, Leavy arrived in Pioche, Nevada near the remote eastern border of the state and went to work as a miner. Michael Casey and three partners arrived in Pioche about the same time. Founded in 1868, the town quickly gained fame for its “toughest town” reputation. It was reported that nearly 60 percent of the homicides reported in Nevada during 1871-72 took place in and around Pioche.

Due mostly to confusion over the exact location of mining claims, mine owners finally resorted to hiring guards. Casey and his three friends offered their services to William H. Raymond and John Ely, whose claim had been squatted on and stolen at the point of a gun by hired men loyal to Tom and Ed Newland. Casey and friends offered to drive off the armed squatters in exchange for a thirty-day lease on the mine. Raymond and Ely readily agreed. With the lease in hand, the four men obtained a $60,000 loan.

On May 30, 1871, Casey went to the bank to deposit his one-quarter share and ran into Tom Gossen. Gossen reminded Casey that he owed him $100, and Casey directed the teller to hand over the loan to Gossen. Gossen then asked Casey to pay interest, which Casey resented. The men exchanged words and when the argument got heated, they drew their pistols. Each stepped out a different door of the bank and found themselves facing each other. They exchanged gun fire and Casey shot Gossen. Before Gossen died the next day, he divided his $25,000 stake between his friends, except for $5,000, which he set aside as a reward for anyone who killed Casey.

His partners thought it too risky to take on the assignment to kill Casey themselves, but made sure he didn't leave town. The citizenry were outraged at Gossen's murder. They argued about who had shot first. Casey's friends said it was Gossen, and Gossen's friends believed it was Casey. Casey found Leavy in Felsenthal's store and argued with Leavy, claiming he had shot Gossen in self-defense, but Leavy swore that it was not true. Casey was infuriated and verbally abused Leavy. Leavy told Casey he only dared to abuse him because Casey was carrying a gun, while Leavy was still wearing his mining gear. Casey told him, "Go get your gun and come a-shooting."

Leavy went to his cabin and retrieved his gun. He returned to the store where he had last seen Casey. David Neagle, a friend of Casey's, was waiting on the front porch, but Leavy avoided him and arrived via a side alley alongside the store, surprising Casey. The two men exchanged gun fire, and Leavy shot Casey in the neck. As Casey fell to the ground gravely wounded, Leavy charged and buffaloed him, killing him. Neagle fired his gun at Leavy, shooting Leavy through both cheeks, shattering his jaw, and knocking out several teeth. Leavey creased Neagle's skull with a shot, but Leavy was disfigured for life.

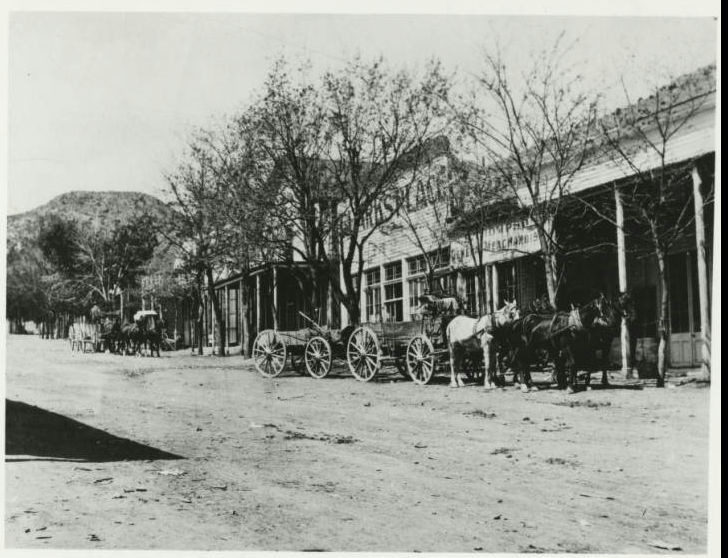
Pioche, Nevada in 1906

Leavy was soon after arrested but was later acquitted for self-defense. Leavy then collected his reward and quit his job as a miner. He traveled to Virginia City, Nevada; to Cheyenne, Wyoming; Deadwood, South Dakota; Leadville, Colorado; and to Tombstone and Tucson, Arizona Territory over the next 10 years, working as a gambler and gunman. In 1873, it was reported that he had another gunfight with a man named Thomas Ryan before leaving Nevada, but he was again acquitted.

=== Second duel ===
On the night of March 9, 1877 at Shingle & Locke's Saloon in Cheyenne, Wyoming, Leavy heard Charlie Harrison make a disparaging remark about another Irishman and took offense. Leavy began to draw his pistol, but Harrison stopped him, protesting that he wasn't "heeled" (armed). Harrison promised to return and give Leavy his chance. Harrison went to his hotel room and got his pistol. He met Leavy in front of Frency's Saloon. Harrison had a local reputation as a deadly gunman, but Leavy's prior gunfighting experience was unknown, and onlookers thought that Harrison would easily win the duel. Both gunmen drew their pistols at the same time. The men fired seven shots, and one of Leavy's rounds struck Harrison in the breast, wounding him. Leavy charged up to Harrison, lying on the ground, and shot him again in the lower abdomen, seriously wounding him. Harrison was taken to a hotel and treated, but died from his wounds a week later. Leavy stood trial for murder but was acquitted.

=== Third duel and death ===
While in Tucson, Arizona, on June 5, 1882, Leavy had an argument with a faro dealer named John Murphy.

William Moyer was dealing at John Murphy's Faro table in the Fashion Saloon when Leavy arrived drunk. He lost about $100 and lost his temper. He accused Moyer of cheating. Murphy was furious when he learned of Leavy's accusations and told Leavy's friends that he needed to apologize. Leavy returned to the Faro table with a friend and denied he'd said anything like that. Police chief Adolph G. Buttner and another officer had heard there might be trouble and intervened. He heard Leavy tell Murphy, "nothing but a fight will do me." Leavy repeatedly made threats against Moyer and Murphy, promising to "waltz on their layout and shoot their checks from the table." They argued further and the exchange of words escalated. Leavy told Murphy, "he was going to the Mexican line and [they] would fight across the wagon track." Murphy agreed.

Leavy borrowed $50 from a Matt Reading, owner of the El Dorado Saloon, to buy a pistol and hire a wagon and team. He told him he intended to "make the sons of bitches fight or he would kill them all." The men agreed to drive the team to Calabasas the next morning.

Murphy likely knew of Leavy's ability as a gunfighter, and decided to ambush Leavy. He recruited two friends and they killed Leavy as he was leaving the Palace Hotel. The three men were arrested immediately afterward.

All three men immediately surrendered and were placed in the jail and in the custody of Pima County Sheriff Robert Havlin “Bob” Paul. In court on June 19, the men were represented by Tom Fitch, who had previously represented Wyatt Earp during the preliminary hearing after he killed several outlaw Cowboys during the Earp Vendetta Ride.

Murphy lived his life as a gambler in southern Arizona and is buried in Tucson. Gibson continued to work in mining and prospecting and died in Prescott, Arizona. Moyer, however, worked at periods as a hired gun and was involved in the Johnnie Mine fight in Nevada in 1895. He was last seen in Alaska around the turn of the twentieth century.

== Legacy ==
Although he is virtually unheard of today, Leavy was one of the most notorious gunfighters of his time. Both Bat Masterson and Wyatt Earp mentioned his name and his abilities.

Jim Leavy is included in a list of twelve most underrated and less-popular gunfighters in history, in the book Deadly Dozen by author Robert K. DeArment.
