= Frederick Bell (disambiguation) =

Frederick Bell may refer to:

- Frederick Bell (cricketer) (1830-1871), English first-class cricketer and umpire
- Frederick Bell (1875-1954), Australian recipient of the Victoria Cross

== See also ==
- Fred Bell
