= William Sharon =

American businessman (1821–1885)

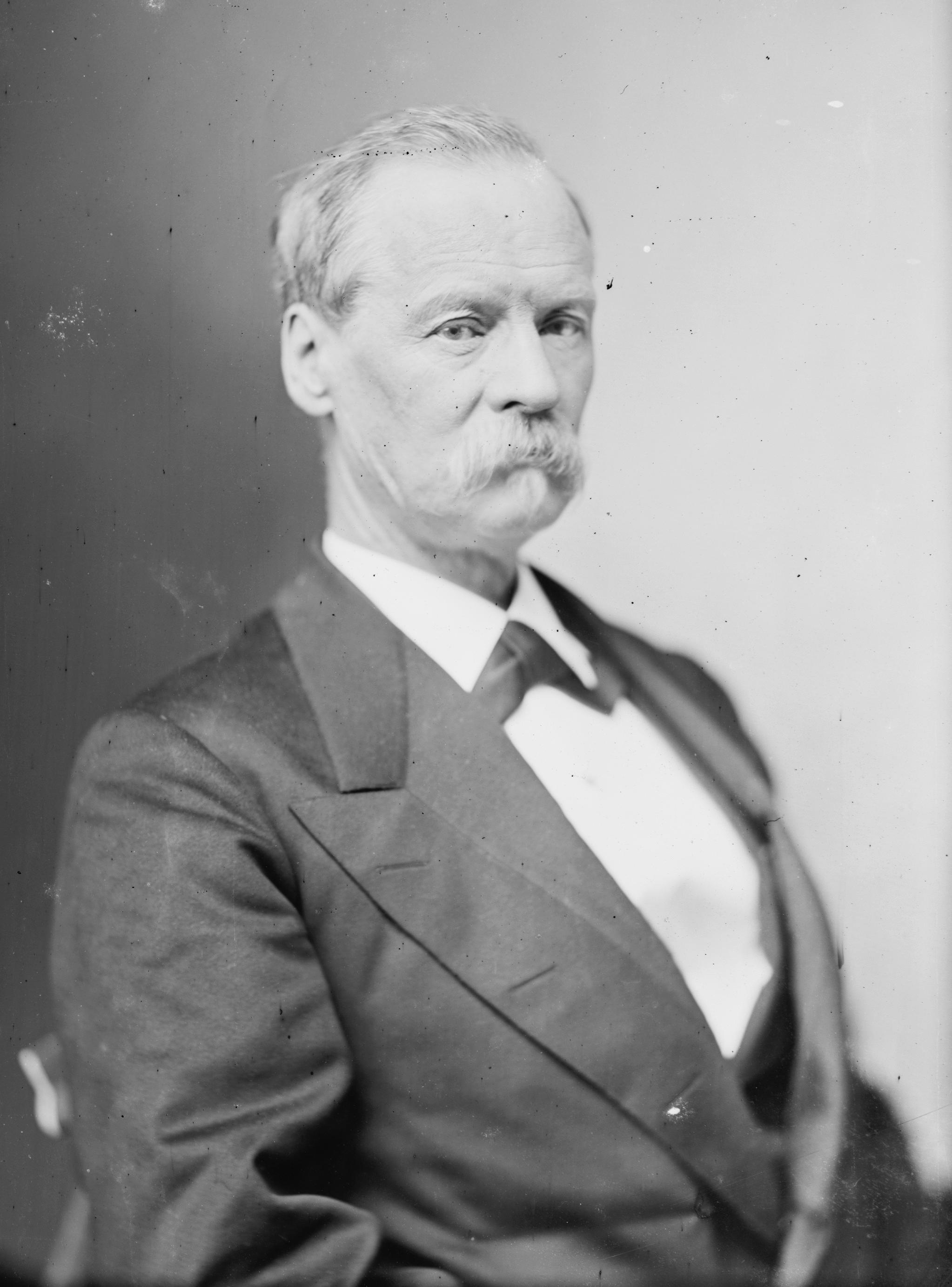

United States Senator from Nevada
- In office March 4, 1875 – March 3, 1881
- Preceded by: William M. Stewart
- Succeeded by: James G. Fair

Personal details
- Born: William Tang Sharon; January 9, 1821 Smithfield, Ohio
- Died: November 13, 1885 (aged 64) San Francisco, California
- Party: Republican
- Spouse: Maria Malloy
- Domestic partner: Sarah Althea Hill
- Profession: Attorney, Real estate

William Tang Sharon (January 9, 1821 – November 13, 1885) was a United States senator, banker, and business owner from Nevada who profited from the Comstock Lode.

== Early life ==
Sharon was born in Smithfield, Ohio, January 9, 1821, the son of William Sharon and Susan Kirk. He attended Ohio University. After studying law in St. Louis, Missouri, he was admitted to the bar. In addition to practicing law, he engaged in mercantile pursuits in Carrollton, Illinois.

== Career in the West ==
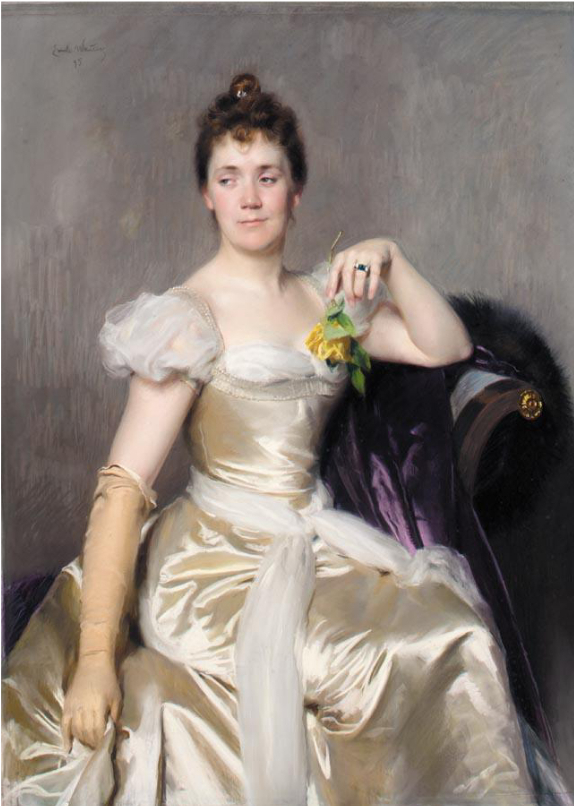
Portrait of his daughter, Florence, Lady Fermor-Hesketh, by Emile Wauters, 1895.

Sharon moved to California in 1849, accompanied by his friend John Douglas Fry (July 1, 1819 – February 3, 1901). Sharon and Fry engaged in business together for a short time in Sacramento. Sharon then moved to San Francisco in 1850, where he dealt in real estate. In 1852, he married Maria Malloy (Quebec, 1832 – San Francisco, May 14, 1875). He moved to Virginia City, Nevada in 1864 as manager of the branch of the Bank of California and became interested in silver mining.

Sharon was a business partner of Darius Mills and William Ralston, as well as the Nevada agent for the Bank of California. The bank profited greatly from loaning money to mining and milling operations and then foreclosing on those operations when the owners defaulted. The Bank of California owned mines as well as reduction mills, which Sharon controlled. In his efforts to monopolize the Comstock mining region, Sharon directed mined ore be sent to this mill or that, and effectively "starved out" competition—i.e., those who had come to the bank for loans. The bank also built and owned the Virginia and Truckee Railroad.

William Sharon acquired many of Ralston's assets in 1875 when Ralston's financial empire collapsed and he died. He was thought by some of his contemporaries to have actually aided the collapse. He certainly was the main beneficiary of Ralston's assets. Those assets included the Palace Hotel in San Francisco and Ralston Hall in Belmont, California.

His daughter Clara married Francis G. Newlands, who became a Congressman and Senator from Nevada. He was also the father of Florence Emily Sharon, who married Sir Thomas George Fermor-Hesketh, 7th Baronet. His son, Frederick, married Louise (née Tevis) Breckinridge, the daughter of banker Lloyd Tevis and divorced wife of John Witherspoon Breckinridge (a son of former Vice President John C. Breckinridge).

== Senator ==
He was elected as a Republican to the United States Senate from Nevada and served from March 4, 1875, to March 3, 1881. He served as the chairman of the Committee on Mines and Mining in the 45th United States Congress.

Sharon spent the majority of his term in office living in California, missing more than 90% of votes.

== Sharon v. Sharon ==
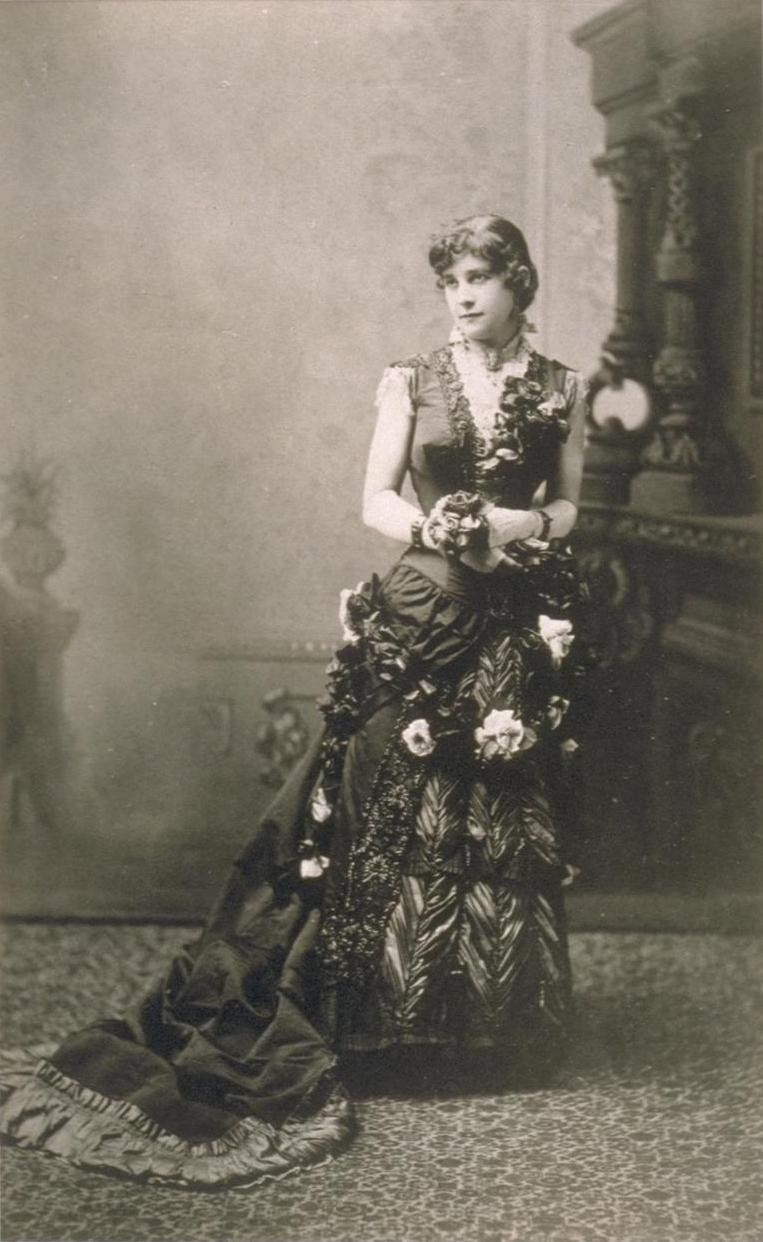
Photograph of his mistress, Sarah Althea Hill

Sarah Althea Hill was a 30-year-old mentally unstable woman with a history of violent behavior. She carried a small-caliber Colt revolver in her purse and did not hesitate to threaten all who crossed her. She attracted the attention of 60-year-old Sharon. He was at the time reportedly earning over $100,000 per month. He gave her $500 (about $17,000) a month and a room in the San Francisco Grand Hotel, adjoining the Palace Hotel where he lived, and enjoyed her companionship from time to time. After just over a year, he tried to end the relationship, but she would not allow it, and kept inviting herself to his office and sent repeated pleas for him to reconsider his decision. He finally evicted her from her room by having the carpets ripped up and the door hinges removed, along with a $7,500 (around $259,000) payment.

When he began a relationship with another woman, she claimed to be his wife and sued him for adultery. One of her attorneys was former Chief Justice of the California Supreme Court David S. Terry. Sharon countersued, claiming that the marriage contract she produced was fraudulent.

As was the custom at the time, U.S. Supreme Court Associate Justice Stephen J. Field was assigned to assist the California Circuit Court. He was assigned to the Sharon vs. Sharon case. Coincidentally, Fields had in 1859 replaced David Terry on the California Supreme Court after Terry killed U.S. Senator David Colbreth Broderick of California in a duel. Although he was not charged with a crime, Terry resigned and left the state.

After William Sharon died on November 13, 1885, his son Frederick and son-in-law Francis Newlands carried on the case. Hill produced a handwritten will that she said she had found in his desk, purporting to bequeath Sharon's entire estate to her. Many were suspicious of its authenticity. She soon married her attorney Terry.

In January 1886, a U.S. Circuit Court Judge and a U.S. District Court Judge sitting as a Circuit Judge rendered a decision that the marriage contract was a forgery. The Terrys appealed in 1888, and were again denied by Field's final Circuit Court opinion. Sarah Terry suddenly stood up, screamed obscenities at the judge, and fumbled in her handbag for her revolver. David Neagle was among the Marshals present and put his pistol in Terry's face. Both Terrys were arrested and jailed.

On August 14, 1889, they boarded a train in Fresno on which, unknown to them, Field and Neagle were returning from Los Angeles. During an altercation, Terry was shot by Neagle, who claimed to be acting as a federal officer. In 1890, the Supreme Court ruled In re Neagle that federal officers are immune from state prosecution for actions taken within the scope of their federal authority.

Sarah Terry, widowed by her husband's death, gradually went insane. On March 2, 1892, she was found insane and committed at age 42 to the California Asylum at Stockton, where she lived for 45 years until her death.

== Death ==
Sharon was buried in Laurel Hill Cemetery in San Francisco; and his remains were moved to Cypress Lawn Memorial Park in Colma, California.

== Legacy ==
The portion of Sharon's estate bequeathed to his daughter Clara was used by her husband Francis Newlands to finance the development of Chevy Chase, Maryland.

The prolonged legal battle over the Sharon fortune was the inspiration for Eleazar Lipsky's novel The Devil's Daughter (1969).

== Notes ==
U.S. Senate
| Preceded by William M. Stewart | U.S. senator (Class 1) from Nevada; 1875–1881; Served alongside: John P. Jones | Succeeded by James G. Fair |
