= Fred Bell (heir) =

American millionaire heir (1875–1934)

Thomas Frederick Bell, Jr. (May 10, 1875 – June 9, 1934) was an American millionaire heir, the son of banker Thomas Bell and his wife Teresa.

== Mary Pleasant litigation ==
Bell's father had been an associate of African-American businesswoman Mary Ellen Pleasant, and with her assistance he had built a fortune of $30 million ($1,070 million today). He died in 1892 after falling down a flight of stairs, leaving a third of his estate and a substantial allowance to his family. Pleasant and his mother, Teresa, oversaw the family finances together, but by 1897 the family was deeply in debt. Fred Bell blamed Pleasant, and he filed a series of lawsuits directed at gaining control of the estate. The litigation perpetuated the image of Pleasant, a light-skinned woman who had once passed for white, as a devious "mammy."

The first lawsuit, filed against Teresa, claimed that she was wasting the family fortune under Pleasant's influence, and demanded that she be removed as head of the household. Two years later Bell publicly accused Pleasant of murdering his father, and Teresa evicted her from the family home. The litigation continued even after Pleasant's death in 1904.

== Career ==
Teresa Bell died in 1922, leaving her children $5 each. They successfully fought the will in court. Out of his mother's $1,000,000.00 estate Fred received only $75,000.00. He invested his money in the stock market, benefitting handsomely from the ongoing stock boom, and was known as "Champagne Fred." By his own admission ,at the time of the death of his third wife ,Alvide H. Thurson ,in May 1929 ,he was broke. The 1929 stock market crash left him destitute. Bell, impoverished despite his three-piece suit and cane, came to symbolize the country's reversal of fortune during the Great Depression. He lost his fortune in the stock market crash, so he sold apples to support himself. On March 7, 1931, a photographer made a picture of him selling apples on a street corner in San Francisco. He died in a poor house.
