= Sarah Althea Hill =

American socialite

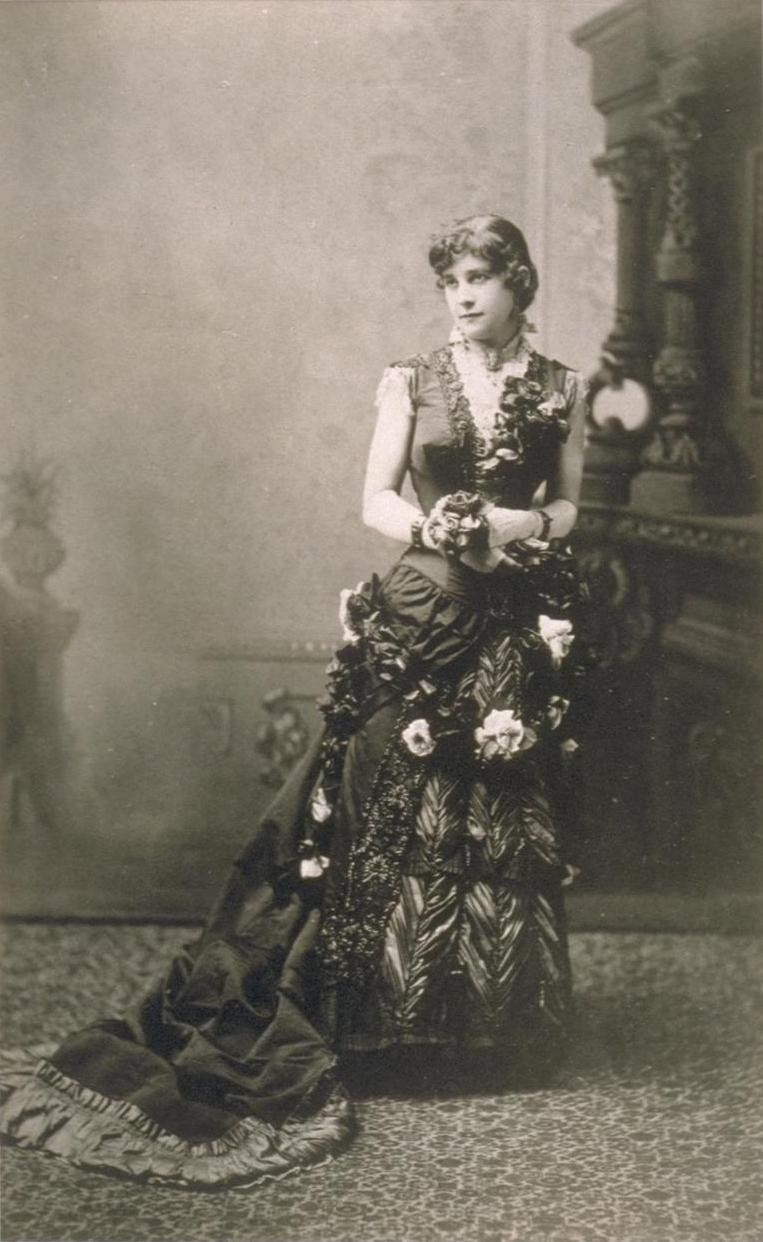
- Sarah Althea Hill
- Born: March 26, 1850; Cape Girardeau, Missouri
- Died: February 14, 1937 (aged 86); Stockton, California
- Other name: Sarah Terry
- Known for: Claimed to be married to millionaire William Sharon
- Spouse: David S. Terry (m. 1886; died 1889)

Sarah Althea Hill (March 26, 1850 – February 14, 1937) was a California socialite who became a national celebrity when she sued millionaire Senator William Sharon for divorce, citing adultery, in 1883. She claimed he had secretly married her three years earlier in a private contract. She was known to carry a small-caliber Colt revolver in her purse and did not hesitate to threaten all who crossed her. The divorce case and related lawsuits set legal precedent and spawned numerous spinoff lawsuits that dragged on for nearly a decade. Two months after Sharon died, she married her attorney David S. Terry, and was declared insane after his death.

== Early years ==
Hill was born in Pleasant Hill, Missouri, the daughter of attorney Samuel H. Hill and Julia Sloan. Her older brother was Hiram Morgan Hill, for whom the California town of Morgan Hill is named. Both of their parents died while they were minors, leaving them to be cared for by relatives. When they came of age, they received $20,000 (or about $538,000 today) each as their inheritance from their parents.

In 1871, at the age of 21, Hill came to San Francisco with her brother, where they lived with their relatives, William and Ada Bryan. In 1880, she had a love affair with attorney Reuben H. Lloyd. When he ended the affair, she attempted suicide on May 10, 1880, in his office by drinking poison. She was saved when her stomach was pumped.

== San Francisco socialite ==
In the fall of 1880, at age 30, Hill met millionaire Senator William Sharon, the president of the Bank of California, the owner of the Palace Hotel, and other properties. At the time, he was 60, a widower, and one of the richest men in the country. He gave her $500 (about $17,000 today) per month and a room in the San Francisco Grand Hotel, adjoining the Palace Hotel where he lived, for the pleasure of her companionship. After just over a year, he tried to end the relationship, but she would not agree. He finally evicted her from the room by having the carpets ripped up and the door hinges removed, along with a $7,500 (around $259,000) payment. When he began a relationship with another woman, she claimed to be his wife and sued him for divorce, claiming adultery.

One of her attorneys was David S. Terry. Sharon claimed he had hired Hill merely as his mistress. Hill produced a marriage contract dated August 20, 1880, and said Sharon had sworn her to secrecy for two years. His reasons, she testified, were that he was up for re-election and could not afford the scandal that would result when his mistress back east heard about the marriage. Sharon countersued, claiming that the marriage contract she produced was fraudulent.

== Sharon vs. Sharon ==
Hill initially won the first case in December 1884. Judge Jeremiah F. Sullivan declared her the legal wife of William Sharon and awarded her alimony and the right to half of his accumulated wealth since the date of their marriage. Because of continuing counter-suits and appeals, Hill never received any of Sharon's money.

William Sharon died on November 13, 1885. Hill produced a handwritten will, supposedly made not long before his death, that she said she found in his desk. Those who knew Sharon doubted its authenticity. It gave Sharon's entire estate to Hill and nothing to his son Frederick and son-in-law Francis Newlands. On January 7, 1886, Hill married one of her lawyers, former California Supreme Court Justice David S. Terry. Terry was well known for killing Senator David C. Broderick in a duel in 1859. Hill and Terry were married at St. Mary's Church in Stockton, California, Terry's home town. The Sharon family continued to fight Hill.

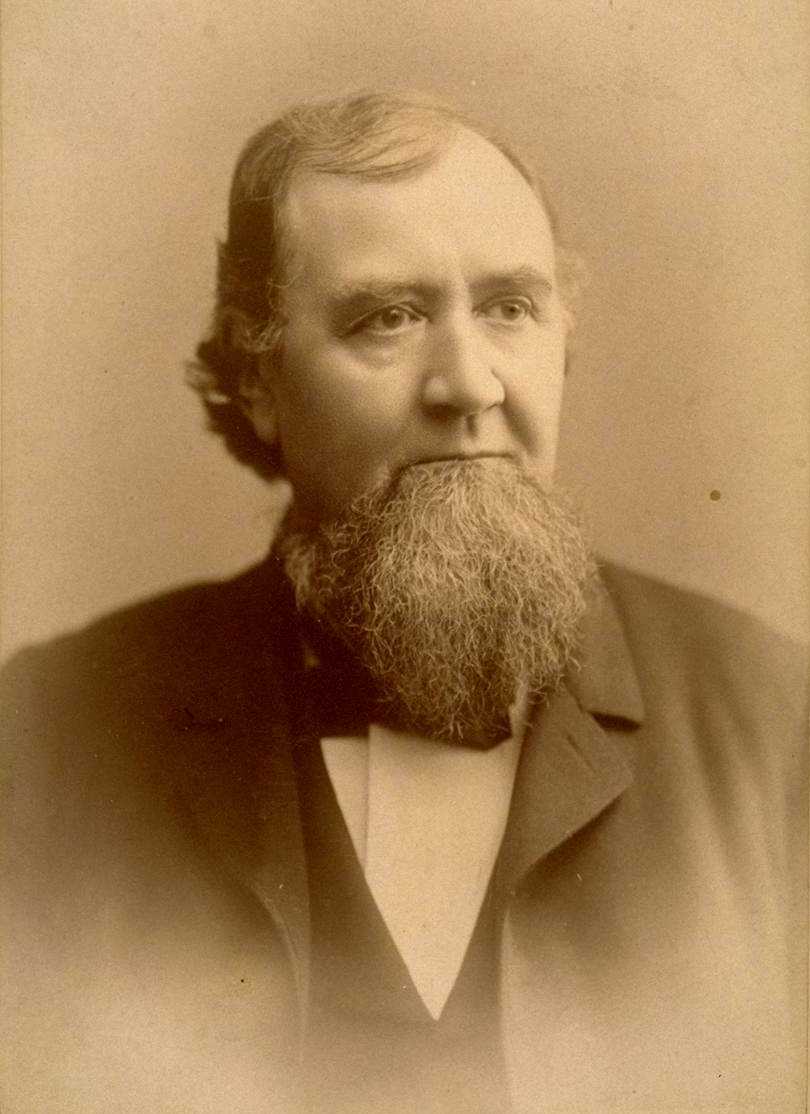
Attorney and former Chief Justice of the California Supreme Court David S. Terry.

As was the custom at the time, U.S. Supreme Court Associate Justice Stephen Johnson Field was assigned to assist the California Circuit Court. He was coincidentally assigned to the Sharon vs. Sharon case. After William Sharon died, his son and son-in-law carried on the case. Many were suspicious of the authenticity of the will Hill claimed to have found. Hill's expenses were primarily bankrolled by her friend, Mary Ellen Pleasant, an elderly black entrepreneur. The lawsuit propelled Hill into the national spotlight and earned her the nickname "The Rose of Sharon".

=== Forged marriage contract ===
In January 1886, a U.S. Circuit Court Judge and a U.S. District Court Judge sitting as a Circuit Judge rendered a decision that the marriage contract was a forgery. The Terrys were jailed when they refused to comply with the Court's order to give the court the marriage contract. They returned to the court in March 1888, seeking further relief. Oral arguments were heard before Justice Stephen J. Field, sitting as Circuit Court Justice, Circuit Court Judge Lorenzo Sawyer, and District Court Judge George Myron Sabin. The Court took the matter under advisement. After the court hearing, Judge Sawyer encountered the Terrys on a train between Fresno and San Francisco on August 14, 1888. When Terry and his wife saw Sawyer on the train, she personally threatened to kill Sawyer.

=== Will a forgery ===
On September 3, 1888, Field delivered the final Circuit Court opinion. He ruled that the will was a forgery. Sarah Althea Hill suddenly stood up, screamed obscenities at the judge, and fumbled in her handbag for her revolver. When Marshal John Franks and others attempted to escort her from the courtroom, attorney Terry rose to defend his wife and drew his Bowie knife. He hit Franks, knocking out a tooth, and the marshals drew their handguns. Spectators subdued Terry and led him out of the courtroom, where he pulled his Bowie knife and threatened all around him. David Neagle was among the Marshals present and put his pistol in Terry's face. Both Terrys were subdued and placed under arrest. Justice Field had them returned to the courtroom and sentenced both to jail for contempt of court. David Terry got six months in jail, and Sarah Terry got one month.

While being transported to jail and while serving their sentences, Terry and his wife repeatedly threatened Justice Field. The Terrys suffered several more setbacks. Both David and Althea were indicted by a federal grand jury on criminal charges arising out of their behavior in the courtroom before Justice Field. In May 1889, the U.S. Supreme Court refused to review the order that invalidated Althea Terry's marriage contract with Senator Sharon. Then, in July, with only one of the four judges who had earlier ruled in their favor, the California Supreme Court reversed itself. It ruled that because Althea Terry and Sharon had kept their alleged marriage a secret, they were never legally married. While in jail or shortly afterward, pregnant Althea suffered a miscarriage.

=== Attack expected ===
The newspapers followed the case and repeatedly speculated about the likelihood of an attack on Field. When Field returned to California as a circuit riding judge for the 9th Circuit Court again the next year, U.S. Attorney General William Miller instructed Marshal Franks on May 6, 1889, to appoint Neagle as a Marshal with the responsibility to protect Field.

It is due to the dignity and independence of the court, and the character of its judge, that no effort on the part of the government shall be spared to make them feel entirely safe and free from anxiety in the discharge of their high duties.

=== Terry killed ===
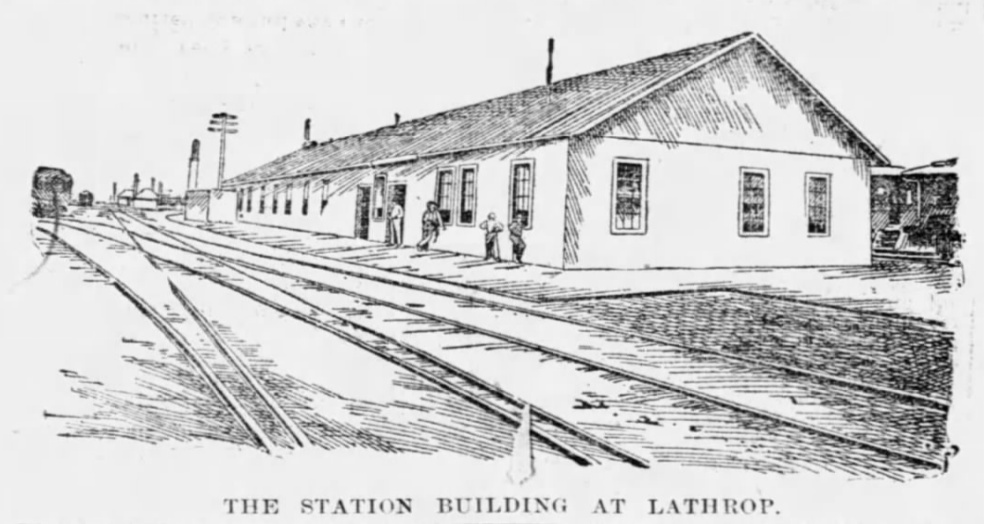
Lathrop, California rail road station in 1889

When David and Althea Terry were released from jail, they returned to Fresno. On August 14, 1889, they boarded a train in Fresno on which unknown to them Field and Neagle were returning from Los Angeles. At 7:10 am, all of the passengers disembarked the train to eat breakfast in the railroad station dining room at Lathrop, California. The conductor immediately sent word to Constable Walker that both men were on board and requested that he come at once to the railroad station, but he couldn't be found right away.

After entering the dining room, Althea Terry saw Field. She quickly exited and returned to her railroad car, apparently to fetch her satchel in which she was known to carry a pistol. When Terry saw Field, he slowly came across the dining room and approached Field from the rear. The account in the San Francisco Chronicle the next day reported that Terry slapped Field on his cheek twice with such force that his glasses were knocked off. Other reports said Terry attempted to slap Field, or to grab him by the whiskers.

Neagle, who was 5'7" tall and weighed 145 pounds, testified that the 6'3", 250-pound Terry recognized Neagle from the earlier confrontation in the courtroom. Neagle later said he saw a look of determination and victory on Terry's face. Neagle rose from his chair and said, "Stop that! I am an officer." Terry drew back his hand again and Neagle drew his .45-caliber revolver and shot Terry at point-blank range in the heart. As Terry fell backward, Neagle fired again, nicking his ear. Neagle announced to the 80 to 100 people in the dining room, "I am a United States Marshal and I defy anyone to touch me!" Field told them that Terry had assaulted him "and my officer shot him."

Althea Hill Terry had been held at the door by one of the dining room proprietors, who had searched the satchel and found a gun within it. She screamed and pushed her way through the crowd, throwing herself over her husband's body. Neagle thought he saw her covertly remove David Terry's knife from his vest. She challenged the crowd to search his body, insistent he was unarmed. The knife was later found in her satchel with the pistol.

Neagle and Field reboarded the train and locked themselves in their cabin. Sarah Terry attempted tried to enter their car, saying she wished to slap Field. Neagle insisted that she be kept out or he would kill her too. The satchel she had fetched from the train was searched and a pistol was found within it. A few minutes later Constable Walker of Lathrop and Stanislaus County Sheriff Purvis arrived. Neagle provided a document issued by the U.S. Attorney General appointing him as a special Marshal to protect Field. Walker arrested Neagle and took him to the county jail in Stockton. Neagle refused to say anything about the shooting. San Joaquin County Sheriff Thomas Cunningham telegrammed San Francisco officers and sought Field's arrest on his arrival in Oakland. This was not done. Judge Fields telegraphed the Marshal's office in Stockton, who relayed the information to the US Attorney General. The United States Attorney in San Francisco filed a writ of habeas corpus for Neagle's release. The circuit court issued the writ after a hearing and ordered Neagle's release.

=== Federal law supreme ===
Sheriff Cunningham, with the aid of the State of California, appealed to the United States Supreme Court. Cunningham's appeal was based on whether Neagle acted in pursuance of the law when he shot Terry. Neagle's defense was based on the letter from Miller to Marshal Franks, which gave him federal authority to act as a law enforcement officer. In 1890, the Supreme Court ruled In re Neagle that federal officers are immune from state prosecution for actions taken within the scope of their federal authority.

== Declared insane ==
After her husband's death, Sarah Terry became obsessed with spiritualism, hiring medium after medium to put her in touch with David Terry. Eventually, since she had no money to hire lawyers, the Sharon case gradually came to an end as the final cases were either dismissed or quickly decided against her. By February, 1892, newspapers were reporting that Mrs. Terry was insane. She wandered aimlessly in the streets of San Francisco, ignoring her appearance. She constantly talked to "spirits", especially that of her husband, and could not sleep. She had periods of violence and believed that she was being tormented by electricity and hypnotism.

Abandoned by her relatives since the beginning of the Sharon case, Terry's fate was left to the only friends she had left, R. Porter Ashe and Mary Ellen Pleasant. Pleasant initiated action to have Terry committed to an insane asylum. After a brief examination by the Insanity Commission, Sarah Terry was committed at age 41 to the California Asylum at Stockton (later known as the Stockton State Hospital) on March 11, 1892.

Diagnosed with "dementia praecox", an early term for schizophrenia, she was extremely violent and had to be restrained for years in the asylum. Despite being termed "our best known patient" by Dr. Asa Clark, the hospital superintendent, Terry received almost no visitors over the years other than a few authors researching her case. She was not treated except with sedatives and eventually adapted to her life in the institution but was deluded into thinking that she was a rich and grand lady, the hospital was her mansion, and the staff her servants.

She remained incarcerated for forty-five years, from ages 42 to 86. When she died of pneumonia, Cornelia Terry, the granddaughter of David Terry, stepped forward to offer her a proper burial, saving Sarah Terry from being buried on the hospital grounds. Sarah Althea Hill Terry is buried in the Terry family plot in the Stockton Rural Cemetery.

== Other sources ==
- Holdredge, Helen (1953). Mammy Pleasant. New York City: G. P. Putnam and Sons. ISBN ASIN: B0006ATHHQ.
- W. H. L. Barnes, Argument for the Defendant, Sarah Althea Sharon vs. William Sharon (San Francisco: Barry, Baird & Co., 1884).
- Oscar T. Shuck, ed., History of the bench and bar of California (Los Angeles: The Commercial Printing House, 1901).
- John D. Lawson, ed., American State Trials, Volume XV (St. Louis: Thomas Law Book Co., 1926).
