= Stockton State Hospital =

Hospital in San Joaquin County, California, US

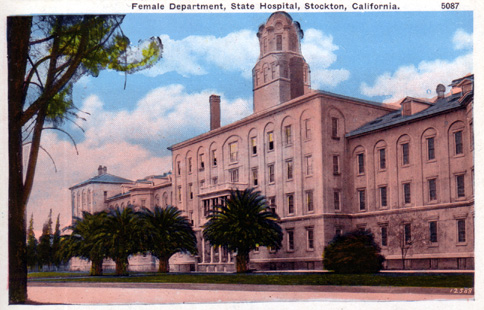
- Stockton State Hospital

Geography
- Location: Stockton, California, United States
- Coordinates: 37°57′58″N 121°17′10″W

Organization
- Type: Specialist

Services
- Speciality: Psychiatric

History
- Former names: Stockton Developmental Center; 1851, Insane Asylum of California at Stockton
- Opened: 1851

Links
- Lists: Hospitals in California

Stockton Developmental Center
- Interactive map of Stockton Developmental Center

History
- Built: 1853

California Historical Landmark
- Designated: March 10, 1995
- Reference no.: 1016

Stockton State Hospital or the Stockton Developmental Center was California's first psychiatric hospital. The hospital opened in 1851 in Stockton, California, United States, and closed 1995–1996. The site is currently used as the Stockton campus of California State University, Stanislaus.

== History ==
It was constructed as the Insane Asylum of California at Stockton in 1851. It was on 100 acres (0.40 km^{2}) of land donated by Captain Charles Maria Weber. The legislature at the time felt that existing hospitals were incapable of caring for the large numbers of people who suffered from mental and emotional conditions as a result of the California Gold Rush, and authorized the creation of the first public mental health hospital in California. The hospital is #1016 on the Office of Historic Preservation's California Historical Landmark list, and today is home to California State University's Stanislaus – Stockton Campus. A cemetery for patients who died there is located on the property.

In April 1888 Frank A. Peltret, an investigative reporter for the San Francisco Examiner, posed as an insane man to be admitted into the California State Insane Asylum at Stockton. He remained in the asylum for several weeks before his colleague outside the asylum obtained Peltret's release. Peltret wrote a revealing newspaper article about his personal experiences and observations as an inmate. He gave a generally favorable report. He said the experience was better than he had expected. Nevertheless, he thought the asylum needed workshops to give the inmates something to do, more variation in the dining hall menu, more physicians, and closer supervision and training of the asylum attendants.

On May 17, 1853, the Stockton General Hospital changed its name to the Insane Asylum of the State of California.

In April 1856 Dr. Samuel Langdon, the second Superintendent of the asylum in its history, fought a duel with Dr. William Ryer, his assistant physician, resulting in a bullet wound to Dr. Langdon's knee and his eventual replacement as Superintendent.

William Troy was originally buried in the hospital's cemetery.

== Notable patients ==
- Carroll Cole (1938–1985), serial killer
- Sarah Althea Hill (1850–1937), socialite with schizophrenia
- Martín Ramírez (1895–1963), Mexican artist with schizophrenia
- Ad Wolgast (1888–1955), lightweight boxing champion

== See also ==
- California Historical Landmarks in San Joaquin County
