= People v. Murray (1859) =

Criminal case

- Supreme Court of California

Decided 1859
- Full case name: The People v. Murray
- Citation(s): 14 Cal. 159

Holding
- To charge a defendant with a crime, the defendant must have made an attempt to commit the crime itself; acts performed in preparation of the crime are not sufficient. Judgement reversed.

Court membership
- Chief Justice: Stephen Johnson Field
- Associate Justices: Joseph G. Baldwin, Warner Cope

Case opinions
- Majority: Field, joined by Baldwin, Cope

People v. Murray, Supreme Court of California, 14 Cal. 159 (1859), is a criminal case that distinguished between preparation and attempt. The court held that when a defendant acts in preparation to commit a crime, in order for these acts to be an attempt, and not mere preparation, the acts must be a final step that would consummate the crime, but for intervention by forces outside the control of the defendant. Murray was charged with attempt to incestuously marry his niece.Murray declared an intention to marry his cousin, then made many numerous preparations to do so, including eloping with his niece, and requesting a witness to go to the magistrate wedding officer to perform the ceremony.

The court found these were merely "preparatory to the marriage; but until the officer was engaged, and the parties stood before him, ready to take the vows... it cannot be said, in strictness, that the attempt was made. The attempt... must be manifested by acts which would end in the consummation of the particular offense, but for the intervention of circumstances independent of the will of the [defendant]."
