= David S. Terry =

American judge (1823–1889)

4th Chief Justice of California
- In office September 18, 1857 – September 12, 1859
- Preceded by: Hugh Murray
- Succeeded by: Stephen J. Field

Associate Justice of the Supreme Court of California
- In office November 15, 1855 – September 17, 1857
- Preceded by: Charles Henry Bryan
- Succeeded by: Warner Cope

Delegate to the Second Constitutional Convention of California
- In office September 28, 1878 – March 3, 1879
- Preceded by: Office established
- Succeeded by: Office abolished
- Constituency: San Joaquin

Personal details
- Born: March 8, 1823 Russellville, Kentucky, U.S.
- Died: August 14, 1889 (aged 66) Lathrop, California, U.S.
- Cause of death: Gunshot wound
- Party: Democratic
- Spouses: Cornelia Runnels (m. 1852; died 1884) Sarah Althea Hill (m. 1886)
- Relations: Benjamin Franklin Terry (brother)

Military service
- Allegiance: United States; Confederate States
- Branch/service: United States Cavalry; Confederate States Army
- Rank: Colonel
- Unit: 8th Texas Cavalry
- Commands: 37th Texas Cavalry
- Battles/wars: Mexican–American War; American Civil War; Battle of Rowlett's Station; Battle of Chickamauga

David Smith Terry (March 8, 1823 – August 14, 1889) was an American politician and jurist who served as the fourth chief justice of the Supreme Court of California; he was an author of the state's 1879 Constitution.

Terry killed U.S. Senator David C. Broderick in a duel in 1859. On August 14, 1889, Terry attacked Associate Supreme Court Justice Stephen J. Field and was shot and killed by Deputy U.S. Marshal David Neagle.

== Early life ==
Terry was born in Todd County, Kentucky. In 1831, his family moved and settled in Brazoria County, Texas. He studied law in the office of his uncle, T. J. B. Hadley, and was admitted to the bar in Galveston in 1845. During the Mexican–American War, Terry served in Captain Samuel L. S. Ballowe's company of Colonel John Coffee Hays's First Regiment of Texas Mounted Rifle Volunteers and participated in the Battle of Monterrey. In 1847, he lost the election for district attorney of Galveston, and in 1849 he joined the gold rush to California, where he attained success with his law practice in Stockton and became active in politics as a Democrat.

== Widow Sanchez case ==
In 1855, he took up the cause of the "Widow Sanchez". Maria Encarnacion Ortega de Sanchez, the widow of a wealthy rancher, was being cheated by local authorities, including the Sheriff, William Roach, who took her fortune under the guise of guardianship. After kidnapping Roach with the help of a local gunslinger named Anastacio Garcia, they held Roach in a jail cell in Stockton until he agreed to release the widow's gold. But Roach had bribed a guard to ride to Monterey and urge Roach's family to hide the gold. The treasure was hidden somewhere in Carmel Valley by Roach's brother-in-law, Jerry MacMahon. MacMahon was killed in a barroom brawl before he could reveal the location of the money.

== Early political career ==
Portrait by William Shew c. 1865

In August 1855, he was nominated by the American Party (Know Nothings), in the special election for the Supreme Court of California seat left vacant by the death of Alexander Wells. He won the election and served from November 15, 1855, to September 12, 1859, as a State Supreme Court Justice; from September 18, 1857, to the end of his term, he was the 4th Chief Justice of California.

In 1856, the San Francisco Committee of Vigilance challenged the corrupt city government controlled by David C. Broderick. Hundreds of armed "Vigilantes" seized two notorious murderers from the city jail and hanged them. The State of California, sympathetic to Broderick, declared San Francisco to be in a state of insurrection. Judge Terry, a Broderick ally, traveled from Sacramento to San Francisco for negotiations between the Vigilance Committee and Broderick's henchmen. He was seized by Vigilance Committee gunmen. Terry was a big man, known for his physical strength and for his skill with the Bowie knife he routinely carried in a sheath under his coat. He stabbed Vigilante Sterling A. Hopkins, who survived. Terry was tried and convicted by the Vigilance Committee, but released, "the usual punishments in their power to inflict, not being applicable, in the present instance."

On January 8, 1858, Chief Justice Terry administered the oath of office at the inauguration of Governor John B. Weller.

== Duel with Senator Broderick ==
On June 25, 1859, the California Democratic Party state convention nominated Warner Cope for Supreme Court over Terry. Although Terry was a close friend of Democratic U.S. Senator from California David Broderick, Terry accused Broderick, a Free Soil advocate, of having engineered Terry's loss for nomination for re-election in the 1859 state elections.

Terry made inflammatory comments at a state convention in Sacramento, which offended Broderick.

On September 13, 1859, Terry and Broderick, having agreed to a duel, met just outside San Francisco city limits. Terry won the coin toss to select weapons and chose pistols. Broderick's discharged early, leaving him open for Terry's shot. At first Terry thought that he had only wounded Broderick, but the senator died three days later. The day before the duel, Terry had resigned as Chief Justice. In June 1860, he was acquitted of murder.

== Civil War ==
In November 1862, Terry campaigned for the Breckenridge Democratic Party. But by March 1863 he left the state for Texas. He fought during the American Civil War, serving in the 8th Texas Cavalry Regiment of the Confederate States Army. The unit was raised by his brother Benjamin Franklin Terry and was also known as Terry's Texas Rangers. Terry later became Colonel of the 37th Texas Cavalry Regiment and was wounded at the Battle of Chickamauga. In November 1865, after the war was over, he moved to a ranch at Guadalajara, near Mazatlan, Mexico.

== Later political career ==
In 1869, Terry came back to Nevada, and by 1870 returned to Stockton and engaged in private practice. From March 1878 to March 1879, he was a delegate from San Joaquin County, California, to the state Constitutional Convention. Terry was chair of the Committee on Legislative Department, and his proposed language on bank directors' liability to depositors was adopted.

In August 1879, the Democratic Party nominated Terry for California Attorney General. The nomination triggered criticism of his record of dueling with Broderick and fighting for the Confederacy. Terry lost the election to Republican Augustus L. Hart. Terry was also on the ballot as one of the Democratic electors for president in that election, as at the time voters in California chose individual electors by name. The Presidential election in California was very close with a narrow lead for the Democratic ticket of Winfield Scott Hancock, but a small number (some four or five hundred) of otherwise Democratic voters refused to vote for Terry, causing one of California's six electoral votes to go to the Republican ticket of James A. Garfield.

== Marriage to Althea Hill ==
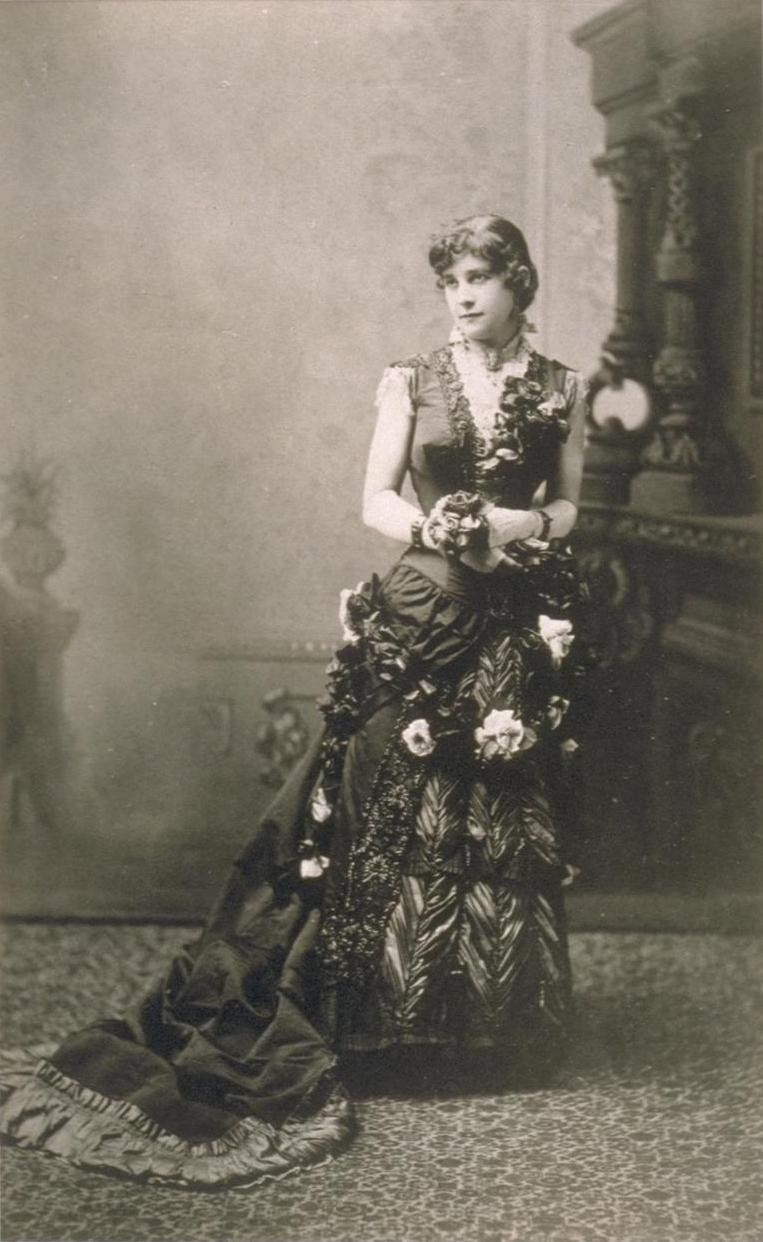
Sarah Althea Hill

In the 1880s, Terry became entangled in a volatile public scandal, representing thirty year old Sarah Althea Hill, who had been the mistress of 60 year old silver millionaire and former U.S. Senator William Sharon. When Sharon ended the relationship and took up with another woman, Hill sued for divorce, claiming adultery.

Sharon countersued, claiming that the marriage contract Hill had provided was a forgery, and that they had never married. Hill wanted a share of Sharon's wealth. The court ruled that the marriage contract was a forgery. Terry appealed the ruling to the United States Supreme Court. After Sharon died on November 13, 1885, Althea married Terry on January 7, 1886, in Stockton. She produced a will that she said she found in Sharon's desk which gave her all of his assets. United States Supreme Court Justice Stephen J. Field, a former friend of Broderick's, heard the case in 1888 as the senior justice of the Federal circuit court in California.

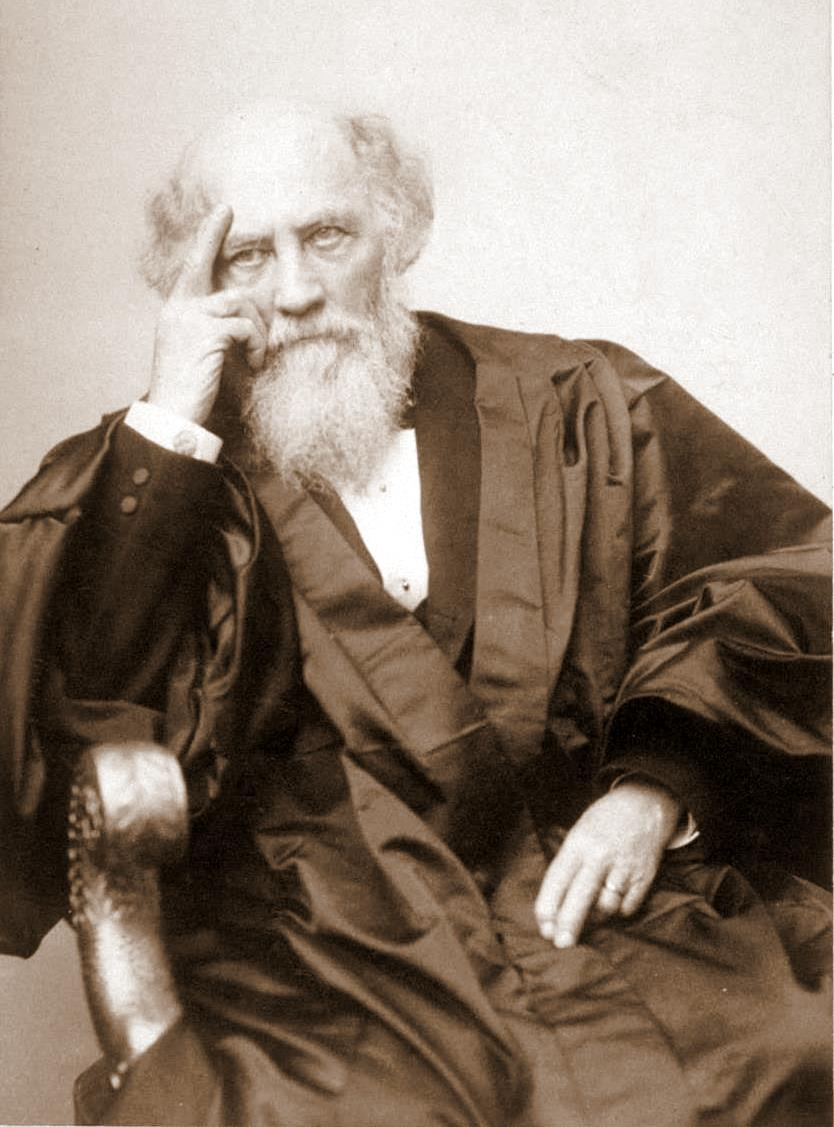
Associate Supreme Court Justice Stephen Field

On September 3, 1888, Field delivered the final Circuit Court opinion. He ruled that the will was a forgery. Sarah Althea Hill suddenly stood up, screamed obscenities at the judge, and fumbled in her handbag for her revolver. When Marshal John Franks and others attempted to escort her from the courtroom, attorney Terry rose to defend his wife and drew his Bowie knife. He hit Franks, knocking out a tooth, and the marshals drew their handguns. Spectators subdued Terry and led him out of the courtroom, where he pulled his Bowie knife and threatened all around him. David Neagle was among the Marshals present and put his pistol in Terry's face. Both Terrys were subdued and placed under arrest. Justice Field had them returned to the courtroom and sentenced both to jail for contempt of court. David Terry got six months in jail, and Sarah Terry got one month.

While being transported to jail and while serving their sentences, Terry and his wife repeatedly threatened Judge Field. The Terrys suffered several more setbacks. Both David and Althea were indicted by a federal grand jury on criminal charges arising out of their behavior in the courtroom before Justice Field. In May 1889, the U.S. Supreme Court refused to review the order that invalidated Althea Terry's marriage contract with Senator Sharon. Then, in July, with only one of the four judges who had earlier ruled in their favor, the California Supreme Court reversed itself. It ruled that because Althea Terry and Sharon had kept their alleged marriage a secret, they were never legally married. While in jail or shortly afterward, pregnant Althea suffered a miscarriage.

== Attack on Justice Field and death ==
A year later, on August 14, 1889, David Terry and Justice Field were on the same train headed to San Francisco when it stopped at the train station in Lathrop for breakfast. Terry slapped Field in the face. Field's bodyguard, Deputy United States Marshal David B. Neagle, fearing that Terry was reaching for the Bowie knife he was known to carry in his breast pocket, shot and killed Terry. Neagle was arrested by San Joaquin County Sheriff Tom Cunningham on a charge of murder. The United States attorney general secured the release of Neagle on a writ of habeas corpus. The issue was resolved by In re Neagle, 135 U.S. 1 (1890), a United States Supreme Court decision that determined that the United States Attorney General had authority to appoint U.S. Marshals as bodyguards.

Terry is buried at Stockton Rural Cemetery in Stockton.

=== Wife declared insane ===
The widow Sarah Terry gradually went insane. She wandered the streets of San Francisco aimlessly, ignoring her appearance. She constantly talked to "spirits," especially that of her husband. She was diagnosed with dementia praecox, an early term for schizophrenia. On March 2, 1892, she was found insane and committed at age 41 to the California Asylum at Stockton, where she lived for 45 years until her death. She is buried in the same grave as her husband. Terry's first wife, Cornelia Runnels, who died in December 1884, is also buried next to him.

== In popular media ==
In the 1952 novel, Incident at Sun Mountain, by Todhunter Ballard, Judge Terry is the leader of a chapter of the Knights of the Golden Circle operating in Virginia City and Carson City, Nevada, on the eve of the Civil War.

In 1963, Brad Dexter was cast as Justice Terry, with Carroll O'Connor as Senator Broderick, in "A Gun Is Not a Gentleman" on the syndicated television anthology series, Death Valley Days, hosted by Stanley Andrews. Though past allies as Democrats, Terry, a defender of slavery, challenged the anti-slavery Broderick to a duel.

== See also ==
- List of justices of the Supreme Court of California
- Hugh Murray
- Peter Hardeman Burnett
- Solomon Heydenfeldt
- Stephen Johnson Field

Legal offices
Preceded by Hugh C. Murray	Chief Justice of California; 1857–1859	Succeeded by Stephen J. Field
Preceded by Charles Henry Bryan	Associate Justice of the California Supreme Court; 1855–1857	Succeeded by Warner Cope
