= California Style Manual =

Legal style manual for California courts

- Subject: Legal citations
- Published: 1942–present
- Publisher: Supreme Court of California

The California Style Manual is "the official organ for the styles to be used in the publication of the Official Reports" of decisions by California's courts, as specified by order of the Supreme Court of California and pursuant to statute. A person filing a document in a California state court may use either the style for legal citations prescribed in the Manual or the very different system promulgated in The Bluebook: A Uniform System of Citation but must use the same style consistently throughout the document. Most California state courts and lawyers practicing in those courts use the Manual's citation style. As of 2025, the latest edition of the Manual is the fourth edition, which was published in 2000 by West Group.

== History ==
The California Style Manual was first published in 1942 by Bernard E. Witkin, who was the California Reporter of Decisions from 1940 to 1949. Originally intended primarily for court staff and the Reporter of Decisions themselves, the Manual soon became popular amongst attorneys. The second edition was written by William Nankervis in 1961, who served as Reporter from 1949 to 1969; the second revised and third editions were written by Robert E. Formichi in 1976 and 1986, respectively, during his term as Reporter from 1969 to 1989.

The fourth and latest edition was published in 2000 by Edward W. Jessen, who served as Reporter from 1989 to 2014. The fifth edition will be written by Lawrence W. Striley, the current reporter of decisions since 2014, and will be published by LexisNexis under contract with the Supreme Court.
