= People v. Hall =

Appealed murder case in the United States

- Supreme Court of California

Decided 1854
- Citation(s): People v. Hall, 4 Cal 399 (1854).

Court membership
- Judges sitting: Chief Justice Murray, Justices Solomon Heydenfeldt and Alexander Wells

Case opinions
- Decision by: Murray, joined by Heydenfeldt
- Dissent: Wells

The People of the State of California v. George W. Hall or People v. Hall, 4 Cal. 399, was an appealed murder case in the 1850s, in which the California Supreme Court established that Chinese Americans and Chinese immigrants had no rights to testify against white citizens. The opinion was delivered in 1854 by Chief Justice Hugh Murray with the concurrence of Justice Solomon Heydenfeldt and the dissent of Justice Alexander Wells.

The ruling effectively freed Hall, a white man, who had been convicted and sentenced to death for the murder of Ling Sing, a Chinese miner in Nevada County. Three Chinese witnesses had testified to the killing.

The case has been described as "containing some of the most offensive racial rhetoric to be found in the annals of California appellate jurisprudence" and "the worst statutory interpretation case in history."

== Background ==
=== Accession of California to the United States ===
With the conclusion of the Mexican–American War, the area of Alta California (which contains the modern U.S. state of California and some other states to its east) came under the control of the United States. Formally, the area was ceded to the United States as part of the Treaty of Guadalupe Hidalgo. In 1850, California formally joined the United States as the 31st state. Other parts of Alta California that became all or part of later U.S. states included Arizona, Nevada, Utah, Colorado, and Wyoming.

=== California Gold Rush and Chinese migration to California ===
In early 1848, gold was discovered in California. This led to the California Gold Rush, where people from the United States, Mexico, and China arrived at California in search of gold. Although mining was the original attraction, many Chinese moved into the cities to provide services. Although their competition in mining was not liked by the whites in California, their presence in city services was initially highly appreciated.

=== Chinese Labor Strike of 1867 ===
In June 1867 a labor strike occurred in the Sierra Nevada mountains by Chinese workers building the Transcontinental Railroad. Because the workers had no formal rights to complain, they mounted one of the earliest instances of peaceful, Confucian-style collective action in a situation where no formal civil rights exist.

=== Legal background ===
Section 14 of the Act concerning Crime and Punishment, passed in 1850, stated that "No black or mulatto person, or Indian, shall be allowed to give evidence in favor of, or against a white man." As written, the Section did not appear to apply to Chinese witnesses.

Between 1849 and 1854, Chinese had made use of the California court systems, with varying degrees of success. For instance, Ah Toy, a woman from China who arrived at San Francisco in 1848, started a brothel in 1850, becoming the first Chinese madam operating in the United States. She attempted to use California's court system to seek justice twice:

- She unsuccessfully sued a group of miners for paying her in brass filings instead of gold dust.
- In August 1852, she threatened to sue Yee Ah Tye, a notorious Chinese leader, for extortion, claiming that he had demanded that her prostitutes pay him a tax. Yee Ah Tye backed down, although he would later be imprisoned for other charges.

== Case decision ==
In 1853, a California court convicted George Hall, a white man, of the murder of Ling Sing, a Chinese miner, based on the testimony of Chinese witnesses. George Hall appealed the verdict, arguing that the testimony of the Chinese witnesses should not be accepted and that Section 394 of the Act Concerning Civil Cases, which barred the use of testimony by blacks, mulattoes, and Indians against whites, should also be extended to banning the testimony of Chinese. The California Supreme Court, in an opinion delivered by Chief Justice Hugh Murray and joined by Justice Solomon Heydenfeldt, sided with Hall.

In support of its decision to include Chinese people within the class prohibited from giving evidence in favor of or against a white man, the California Supreme Court in the majority opinion stated the following about Chinese people:

The same rule which would admit them to testify, would admit them to all the equal rights of citizenship, and we might soon see them at the polls, in the jury box, upon the bench, and in our legislative halls.

This is not a speculation which exists in the excited and over-heated imagination of the patriot and statesman, but it is an actual and present danger.

The anomalous spectacle of a distinct people, living in our community, recognizing no laws of this State, except through necessity, bringing with them their prejudices and national feuds, in which they indulge in open violation of law; whose mendacity is proverbial; a race of people whom nature has marked as inferior, and who are incapable of progress or intellectual development beyond a certain point, as their history has shown; differing in language, opinions, color, and physical conformation; between whom and ourselves nature has placed an impassable difference, is now presented, and for them is claimed, not only the right to swear away the life of a citizen, but the further privilege of participating with us in administering the affairs of our Government.

— Chief Justice Hugh Murray

The case had a dissenting opinion written by Justice Alexander Wells which simply stated: "From the opinion of the Chief Justice, I most respectfully dissent."

== Consequences and responses ==
The case did not make violence against Chinese de jure legal: it was still possible to convict a white person of murdering Chinese if credible white witnesses, or other reliable evidence, could be produced. However, it de facto made it much easier for whites to get away with violence against Chinese.

Ah Toy, the successful Chinese madam, closed down her brothel in 1854. While this was primarily because of the 1854 anti-prostitution laws instituted in California, it is also believed to have been motivated in part by the increased risk of harassment due to the decision in People v. Hall.

In January 1855, William Speer, the Presbyterian minister in San Francisco Chinatown, responded strongly, "The principles of the Magna Carta, the prerogatives of juries, the rights of judges and advocates, Republicanism and Christianity, and common humanity are all outraged by this iniquitous decision of the Supreme Court of California".

In April 1857, the San Francisco Evening Bulletin editorialized, "We regret this action, based as it is entirely on prejudice, and can only express our conviction that a period will ultimately arrive when it will be clear to all that the law as it stands is mischievous and prejudicial to the highest degree to the public interests."

In 1860, Pun Chi, a businessman from China, wrote an impassioned appeal challenging the verdict in People v. Hall and in general challenging the negative view of Chinese in California. His appeal was translated to English by the Presbyterian minister William Speer in 1870.

The California Civil Practice Act of 1872 invalidated all testimony laws, and therefore overrode the decision in People v. Hall.

== See also ==
- Racism in the United States
