= Insider Exclusive =

Insider Exclusive logo

The Insider Exclusive television show regularly produces original Dateline, 60 Minutes, 20/20, and prime time style television shows for the public and broadcasts them on major cable networks such as PBS, CNN, MSNBC, TruTV, Fox, Time Warner and Comcast, Cox, Charter, A&E, Discovery, TLC, and Bravo. The focus is primarily on "Important Business, Legal and Public Policy Issues". The Insider Exclusive also features important cases that represent injustice, unfairness and/or deception, either for individuals or groups seeking to vindicate their civil rights.

Created and hosted by Steve Murphy, the format is original programming based on exclusive and personal interviews, similar to PBS's Bill Moyers, CNN's Anderson Cooper, and PBS's Charlie Rose shows. Each show features the lives of local and national newsmakers, entertainers, lawyers, entrepreneurs, celebrities, and best-selling authors. The shows feature rare, behind-the-scenes, exclusive perspectives of headline stories.

== Series overview ==
- Insider Exclusive Special Feature Series
- America's Finest Trial Lawyer Series
- America's Best TV Judges
- America's Best Civil Leaders
- America's Prominent Doctors Series
- America's Best TV Anchors & legal Commentators
- Headline Civil Rights News Series
- Headline Legal News Series
- Headline Business News Series
- Helping America's Children Series
- The IRS & You: Solving Tax Related Collection problems
- The Energy & Environmental Advisor Series
- Mass Torts & Pharmaceutical Drug Litigation News Series
- Los Angeles Most Influential Women Series
- Southern California's Premier Law Firms Series
- Houston's Premier Law Firms Series
- Chicago's Premier Law Firms Series
- New York's Premier Law Firms Series

== List of guests ==
- William Bratton
- Rikki Klieman
- Linda Fairstein
- Winston Mckesson
- John Manly
- Jane Valez-Mitchell
- Rocky Delgadillo
- Tom Mesereau
- Lee Goldberg
- Ricardo Echeverria
- Shernoff Bidart Darras
- Scott Marks
- Kenn M. Spivak
- Tim Pulido
- Paul Henderson
- Dr. Lois Lee
- Yvonne Burke
- Lloyd Levine
- Paul Cohen
- Marshall Oldman
- Dr. Eve Wood
- Laura Miranda
- Daniel Petrocelli
- Robert L. Shapiro
- Miton C. Grimes
- Judge Cristina Perez
- Mayor Jimmy Delshad
- Brian Dunn
- Randy McMurray
- Joseph M. Barett
- Julia Sylvia
- Daniel Cargnelutti
- Valerie Brennan
- Genie Harrison
- Tennie Pierce
- Gary S. Casselman
- Bradley C. Cage
- Patricia J. Barry
- Donna Armstrong
- Camille Lombardo
- Madelyn Alfano
- Dr. Kathy Magliato
- Conroy Kanter
- Ninon De Vera De Rosa
- Bonnie Nijst
- Irina J. Drill
- Marilyn Fox
- Dorothy Green
- Jane W. Scott
- Lucia Diaz
- Gail McPherson
- Maureen Faulkner
- Neville L. Johnson
- Paul Kiesel

== Most highly rated shows ==
1. NY Times Bestseller: Murdered by Mumia: A Life Sentence of Loss, Pain, and Injustice.
2. Whistleblower Lawsuits at the Los Angeles DWP
3. Civil Rights News: Police Brutality at the Hawthorne Police
4. Wrongfully Convicted - Life After Exoneration Program
5. Crisis in Los Osos, California
6. Police Misconduct at The LA Sheriff's Dept
7. Ray Boucher & The Consumer Attorneys of California:
8. Randy H. McMurray, Esq. of McMurray Henriks, LLP & Consumer Attorneys Association of Los Angeles ("CAALA")
9. Tom Girardi & Howard Miller & Girardi & Keese of Girard & Keese
10. Paul Kiesel: Changes Needed in the Medical Injury Compensation Reform Act (MICRA)
