= Edward Norton (judge) =

American judge (1808–1872)

Associate Justice of the California Supreme Court
- In office January 2, 1862 – January 2, 1864
- Appointed by: Direct election
- Preceded by: Joseph G. Baldwin
- Succeeded by: Elections under 1862 amendment to California constitution and 1863 enabling law

Personal details
- Born: October 29, 1808 Canandaigua, New York, U.S.
- Died: May 2, 1872 (aged 63) London, United Kingdom
- Education: Union College (B.A.)

Edward Norton (October 29, 1808 – May 2, 1872) was an American lawyer and Associate Justice of the Supreme Court of California from January 2, 1862, to January 2, 1864.

== Biography ==
Born in Canandaigua, New York, Norton received a liberal arts education at Union College. After his admission to the Bar, he practiced law for several years in Buffalo, and then in the New York City. In 1849, he moved to California and practiced in San Francisco. In 1851, he served as a member of the Whig Party central committee in Sacramento.

Also in 1851, he was appointed Reporter of Decisions, and began drafting his reports. But after his drafts were destroyed in a city fire on May 4, 1851, he resigned from the position, and was replaced by Nathaniel Bennett.

In November 1852, the Democratic Party nominated Norton for Judge of the San Francisco county District Court, running against the Whig candidate, Delos Lake, who won by merely 21 votes. In June 1854, Governor John Bigler appointed Norton as a Judge of the Twelfth District Court, to stand at the next election. In September 1854, Norton was elected on the ticket of both the Democratic Party and Know Nothings to a full term on that Court. On December 16, 1860, having continued on the District bench for a full term of six years, he retired on account of his health, which had become seriously impaired.

Norton determined to visit to Europe, intending to be absent several years. After his arrival in Europe, and without his knowledge, he was elected to the Supreme Court of California on the Republican Party ticket. On receiving the news, he returned to California to commence his term in January 1862. Chief Justice Stephen Johnson Field described Norton as a skilled trial court judge who was unsuited to the appellate bench. In October 1863, elections were held for all seats on the Supreme Court due to an 1862 amendment to the California constitution and 1863 enabling law, and Norton chose to retire rather than seek re-election.

One anecdote from Norton's service on the court involves him giving a young lawyer an examination for admission to the bar:

Justice Edward Norton asked the applicant two questions. First, "What is the purpose of a demurrer?" The student answered, "For the delay." The judge trumpeted, "Young man, that's not the law." The judge asked the second question, "If a man brought you a promissory note past due and wanted it collected by law in the most expeditious manner, what would you do?" The student responded, "I would collect my fee." The Judge again declared that was "not the law," but leaned over his desk to his clerk and ordered, "Mr. Clerk, swear him in." Although the prospective lawyer did not give the "law" answers expected, he did give the judge the practical "lawyering" answers necessary for successful practice in frontier California.

On May 2, 1872, Norton died while on a trip to London, England.

== See also ==
- List of justices of the Supreme Court of California
- California Reporter of Decisions
- Stephen Johnson Field
- Edwin B. Crocker
- Warner Cope

Legal offices
Preceded by Joseph G. Baldwin	Associate Justice of the California Supreme Court; 1862–1864	Succeeded by Elections under 1862 amendment to California constitution and 1863 enabling law
