= Shew =

Shew is a surname. Notable people with the surname include:

- Bobby Shew (born 1941), American jazz trumpeter
- Joel Shew (1816–1855), American physician, hydrotherapist, and natural hygiene advocate
- William Shew (1820–1903), American photographer
- Etienne Shew-Atjon (born 1974), Dutch footballer
