= Senator Chamberlain (disambiguation) =

George E. Chamberlain (1854–1928) was a U.S. Senator from Oregon from 1909 to 1921. Senator Chamberlain may also refer to:

- Calvin T. Chamberlain (1795–1878), New York State Senate
- E. Kirby Chamberlain (fl. 1840s–1850s), California State Senate
- George Henry Chamberlain (1862–1943), Ohio State Senate
- Loyed Ellis Chamberlain (fl. 1890s), Massachusetts State Senate
- Mellen Chamberlain (1821–1900), Massachusetts State Senate
- Roger Chamberlain (born 1963), Minnesota State Senate
- Robert P. Chamberlin (born 1965), Mississippi State Senate
