= Solomon Heydenfeldt =

American judge

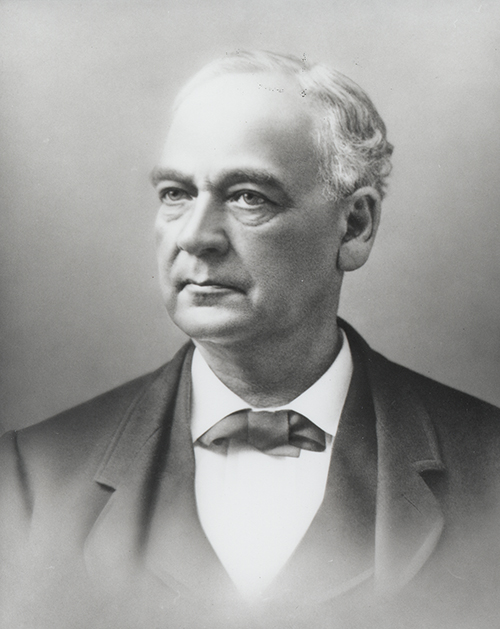

Associate Justice of the California Supreme Court
- In office January 1, 1852 – January 6, 1857
- Appointed by: Direct election
- Preceded by: Serranus Clinton Hastings
- Succeeded by: Peter H. Burnett

Personal details
- Born: 1816 Charleston, South Carolina, U.S.
- Died: September 15, 1890 (age 73–74) San Francisco, California, U.S.
- Spouse: Catherine Heydenfeldt (death 1887); Elisabeth A. Heydenfeldt

Solomon Heydenfeldt (1816 – September 15, 1890) was an American attorney who was an associate justice of the California Supreme Court from 1852 to 1857. He was the second Jewish justice of the court, after Henry A. Lyons, but was the first elected by direct vote of the people.

== Biography ==
In 1816, Heydenfeldt was born in Charleston, South Carolina. He read law in the offices of William F. De Saussure, a son of the noted Chancellor Henry William de Saussure. In 1837, at 21 years of age, Heydenfeldt moved to Russell County and Tallapoosa County, Alabama. There, he was admitted to the state bar, practiced law, and in 1841 served as a judge.

In 1850, he moved to California and was admitted to the bar. In 1851, his brother, Elcan Heydenfeldt, served as President pro tempore of the California State Senate, and Solomon unsuccessfully sought the Democratic Party nomination to the United States Senate.

In October 1851, he ran against Whig Party candidate, Tod Robinson, to fill the seat of Serranus Clinton Hastings, and won a six year term. Heydenfeldt's notable opinions include Irwin v. Phillips, which established the doctrine of prior appropriation in western water law jurisprudence. In March 1852, he returned to Alabama to visit his family, and his absence from the state led to a court opinion on whether his seat was "vacant".

In 1854, he concurred with a decision delivered by California Chief Justice Hugh Murray in People v. Hall, ruling that the use of testimony by black, mullato, and Indian witnesses against whites should also be extended to banning the testimony of Chinese witnesses.

The same rule which would admit them to testify, would admit them to all the equal rights of citizenship, and we might soon see them at the polls, in the jury box, upon the bench, and in our legislative halls.

— Chief Justice Hugh Murray

On January 6, 1857, he stepped down from the bench, and joined Vermont-born brothers Oscar L. Shafter and James McMillan Shafter in forming the law firm of Shafter, Shafter, Park and Heydenfeldt, along with Trevor Park, in San Francisco. While in private practice, Heydenfeldt argued before the California Supreme Court in Ex Parte Newman (1858), where he successfully defended a Jewish man's right to work on Sunday.

In 1862, during the Civil War, he refused on principle to take a test oath for lawyers of loyalty to the Union cause against slavery (as did Virginia-born James D. Thornton), which led to his semi-retirement from the Bar.

== Civic activities ==
Heydenfeldt helped found the first free kindergarten in San Francisco, along with New York professor Felix Adler.

== Personal life ==
He married twice: first, in Alabama, to Catherine Heydenfeldt, who died July 3, 1887, and then, in California, to Elisabeth A. Heydenfeldt, who survived him. He had ten children. His son, Solomon, graduated from Santa Clara University and in October 1872 became an attorney, and his nephew, Walter P. Levy, was a judge of the San Francisco Superior Court.

== See also ==
- List of Jewish American jurists
- List of justices of the Supreme Court of California
- Alexander O. Anderson
- Alexander Wells
- Charles Henry Bryan
- David S. Terry
- Hugh Murray
- State Bar of California

Political offices
Preceded by Serranus Clinton Hastings	Associate Justice of the California Supreme Court; 1852–1857	Succeeded by Peter H. Burnett
