= Joseph G. Baldwin =

American judge (1815–1864)

Joseph Glover Baldwin
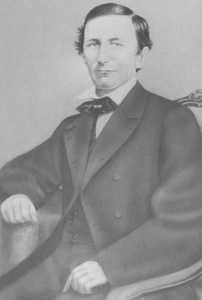

Associate Justice of the California Supreme Court
- In office October 2, 1858 – January 2, 1862
- Appointed by: Direct election
- Preceded by: Hugh Murray
- Succeeded by: Edward Norton

State Representative in the Alabama House of Representatives
- In office 1843–1849
- Appointed by: Direct election

Personal details
- Born: January 21, 1815 Winchester, Virginia, U.S.
- Died: September 29, 1864 (aged 49) San Francisco, California, U.S.
- Spouse: Sidney Gaylard White (m. 1839)
- Children: Alexander W. Baldwin, son

Joseph Glover Baldwin (January 21, 1815 – September 29, 1864) was an American attorney and humor writer who served as an associate justice of the Supreme Court of California from October 2, 1858, to January 2, 1864.

== Biography ==
Born in Winchester, Virginia, Baldwin was educated in Stanton, Virginia. He displayed precocious talents; while still a teenager he worked as a Deputy Court Clerk and a newspaper editor. He read law in the office of his uncle, Judge Briscoe G. Baldwin, to become a lawyer and was admitted to the bar by age 19. In 1836, Joseph Baldwin moved to DeKalb County, Alabama, thereafter moving to Gainesville, Alabama in 1838. There, he practiced law with his brother, Cornelius C. Baldwin, and with J. Bliss. Another brother, Oliver P. Baldwin, was a lawyer, newspaper editor, and speaker in Cleveland and later Richmond, Virginia. Gainesville was in Sumter County, which had a sizeable and growing population profiting from a booming economy and from enslaved labor farming the rich soil; the people Baldwin associated with were "men of the first rank in the legal profession, of high attainments in scholarship, of genuine literary taste and culture, and of fun-loving spirits and mirth-provoking propensities"—these were the "flush times" he would describe in his first book.

In 1843, Baldwin was elected as a Whig to the Alabama House of Representatives. In August 1849, he was defeated by Democrat Samuel Williams Inge in a bid for the United States Congress by only 400 votes. In 1850, Baldwin moved to Livingston, Alabama, where he continued to practice and to write. He published a book of humorous stories, The Flush Times of Alabama and Mississippi: A Series of Sketches (1853), and a collection of sketches of US politicians, Party Leaders (1855).

In 1853, Baldwin moved to Mobile, and in 1854 to California, where he served as counsel on a number of important cases. In 1858, following the death of Chief Justice Hugh Murray, Baldwin was nominated by the Democratic Party, as well as endorsed by the Lecompton Democrat convention, and elected by the people to serve out the remainder of Murray's term on the California Supreme Court from October 2, 1858, until January 2, 1862. Chief Justice Stephen Johnson Field praised Baldwin's opinion in Hart v. Burnett (1860), concerning pueblo land grants, as a model of scholarly learning. In July 1861, he was put forward for nomination by the Breckenridge Democratic Party for another term on the court, but he declined the nomination. Edward Norton was elected to fill Baldwin's seat.

After stepping down from the bench, Baldwin resumed the practice of law in San Francisco. In April 1864, he signed the loyalty oath to the Union required of attorneys that fellow Southerners Solomon Heydenfeldt and James D. Thornton refused to sign.

Baldwin died in San Francisco on September 29, 1864.

== Personal life ==
In 1839, he married Sidney Gaylard White and they had at least six children. Their son, Alexander W. Baldwin, became an attorney and was appointed as a judge of the United States District Court for the District of Nevada. He died in November 1869 in a railway accident in Alameda County, California. In 1863, during the American Civil War, another son, Joseph G. Baldwin Jr., was accused of plotting with a group of sympathizers with the Confederate States of America to capture military posts in California. He died August 14, 1864, at 20 years of age, in Warm Springs, California. Their daughter, Kate S. Baldwin, married John B. Felton, who was her father's law partner and later mayor of Oakland. She died December 13, 1888, in Oakland. Of the three other children: two sons, Sidney died young and John died in 1868 at age 22; and a daughter, Cornelia Baldwin, resided with her mother.

== Selected publications ==
- Baldwin, Joseph G. (1853). The flush times of Alabama and Mississippi. A series of sketches. Archive.org.
- Baldwin, Joseph G. (1855). Party leaders; sketches of Thomas Jefferson, Alex'r Hamilton, Andrew Jackson, Henry Clay, John Randolph, of Roanoke, including notices of many other distinguished American statesmen. Archive.org.

== See also ==
- List of justices of the Supreme Court of California
- Stephen Johnson Field
- Warner Cope

Legal offices
Preceded by Hugh Murray	Associate Justice of the California Supreme Court; 1858–1862	Succeeded by Edward Norton
Preceded by	State Representative in the Alabama House of Representatives; 1843–1849	Succeeded by
