= Alexander O. Anderson =

American judge

Alexander Outlaw Anderson
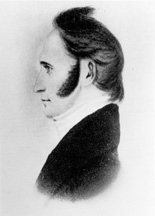

United States Senator from Tennessee
- In office February 26, 1840 – March 3, 1841
- Preceded by: Hugh Lawson White
- Succeeded by: Spencer Jarnagin

Associate Justice of the California Supreme Court
- In office April 6, 1852 – January 2, 1853
- Appointed by: Governor John Bigler
- Preceded by: Henry A. Lyons
- Succeeded by: Alexander Wells

Personal details
- Born: November 10, 1794 Jefferson County, Tennessee (now Hamblen County, Tennessee)
- Died: May 23, 1869 (aged 74) Knoxville, Tennessee
- Party: Democratic
- Spouses: Maria Hamilton (m. 1821; died 1825) Eliza Rosa Deaderick (m. 1825; died 1866)
- Relations: Joseph Anderson, father; Pierce B. Anderson, brother; James W. Deaderick, cousin
- Education: Washington College
- Profession: Politician, Lawyer, Judge

Alexander Outlaw Anderson (November 10, 1794 – May 23, 1869) was an American slave owner and attorney who represented Tennessee in the United States Senate, and later served in the California State Senate, and on the California Supreme Court.

== Early life ==
The son of Patience Outlaw and longtime U.S. Senator Joseph Anderson, he was born at his father's home, "Soldier's Rest" in Jefferson County (now Hamblen County), Tennessee. He was named for his maternal grandfather, frontiersman Alexander Outlaw (1738–1826).

As a youth he graduated from Washington College near Greeneville, Tennessee. He volunteered for service in the War of 1812 and fought under Andrew Jackson in the Battle of New Orleans in 1815. Later that year he was admitted to the bar and began a practice in Dandridge, Tennessee. In 1821, Jackson was appointed Territorial Governor of Florida, and Anderson the United States district attorney of West Florida.

Afterward, he moved to Knoxville, and then served as the superintendent of the United States United States General Land Office in Alabama in 1836. He was an agent in the Indian removals of 1838 for Alabama and Florida, and held a contract through 1848.

== Senate and legal career ==
In February 1840, Anderson was elected to the United States Senate by the Tennessee General Assembly to the vacancy caused by the resignation of Senator Hugh Lawson White. He was a member of the Whig party whose resignation was orchestrated by Governor James K. Polk so that a Democratic senator could be appointed. Anderson served in that body from February 26, 1840, to March 3, 1841, when the term expired. In May 1840, he was a delegate to the national Democratic Party convention in Baltimore, Maryland. Anderson did not stand for reelection to the seat; it was to remain vacant for a period when a group of Tennessee Democratic legislators called the "Immortal Thirteen" refused to meet and give a quorum sufficient to allow the election of a successor, apparently preferring no representation to that by a member of the other party, the Whigs.

After leaving the Senate, Anderson remained active in politics. In September 1844, he published a series of letters on the admission of Texas as a new state, which were published as a book. In July 1847, he announced his support for Zachary Taylor of Louisiana as a candidate for President of the United States.

Anderson was a leader of an overland company of leaving from Independence, Missouri, and going to California in 1849. He served in the California State Senate in 1852 as a Democrat. In February 1852, his name was put forward for U.S. Senator, but he lost the Democratic Party nomination. He then was appointed by Governor John Bigler as an associate justice of the California Supreme Court, serving from April 6, 1852, to January 2, 1853, before returning to Tennessee in 1853 or 1854. While in the California Supreme Court, he co-authored a ruling supporting the Fugitive Slave Act, writing, "Slaves are not parties to the Constitution, and although ‘persons,’ they are property."

Anderson later practiced law in Washington, D.C., appearing before both the Court of Claims and the Supreme Court of the United States. During the American Civil War he returned to Alabama, practicing law in Mobile and Camden. Again returning to Tennessee, he died in Knoxville on May 23, 1869, and is buried in the Old Gray Cemetery.

== Personal life ==
In 1821, he married Maria Hamilton in Washington, D.C., who died in 1825 in Jonesboro, Tennessee. On June 7, 1825, he remarried married to Eliza Rosa Deaderick, his cousin, and they had 11 children. She died October 15, 1866, in Knoxville, Tennessee.

== See also ==
- List of justices of the Supreme Court of California
- Hugh Murray
- Solomon Heydenfeldt

== Footnotes ==
U.S. Senate
Preceded by Hugh L. White	U.S. senator (Class 2) from Tennessee; February 26, 1840 – March 3, 1841; Served alongside: Felix Grundy and Alfred O. P. Nicholson	Succeeded by Spencer Jarnagin
Legal offices
Preceded by Henry A. Lyons	Associate Justice of the California Supreme Court; April 6, 1852–January 2, 1853	Succeeded by Alexander Wells
