= Spencer Jarnagin =

American politician (1792–1851)

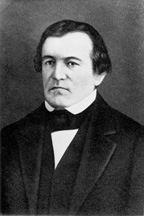

United States Senator from Tennessee
- In office October 17, 1843 – March 3, 1847
- Preceded by: Alexander O. Anderson
- Succeeded by: John Bell

Member of the Tennessee Senate
- In office 1833–1835

Personal details
- Born: 1792 Grainger County, Tennessee
- Died: June 25, 1851 (aged 58–59) Memphis, Tennessee
- Party: Whig
- Profession: Politician, Lawyer

Spencer Jarnagin (1792 – June 25, 1851) was a United States Senator from Tennessee from 1843 to 1847.

== Life and career ==
Jarnagin was born in what was shortly to become Grainger County, Tennessee. He graduated from Greenville College in 1813 and after the study of law was admitted to the bar in 1817. He served in the Tennessee State Senate from 1833 to 1835. From 1836 to 1851 he served on the Board of Trustees for East Tennessee College, now the University of Tennessee. He continued his practice of law after moving to Athens, Tennessee in 1837. Jarnagin was an elector for the Whig ticket of William Henry Harrison and John Tyler in the 1840 United States presidential election.

In 1841 he was nominated for U.S. Senator by the Whig caucus in the Tennessee General Assembly. However, some of the Democrats in the legislature decided that no Senator would be preferable to a Whig. Known as the "Immortal Thirteen" by Tennessee Democrats, they refused to allow a quorum on the issue. By the time Jarnagin was eventually elected to the seat and sworn in, over two and half years, almost half of the term, had elapsed. Jarnagin finally assumed office on October 17, 1843 and served until March 3, 1847. During this time, he served as the Chairman of the Committee on Revolutionary Claims. The Whigs nominated him for a second term in 1847, but he was not elected, apparently the Democrats being more amenable to John Bell, another Whig who was eventually elected his successor; a subsequent campaign by Jarnagin for the Tennessee Supreme Court was likewise unsuccessful. Jarnagin moved to Memphis and continued his practice of law there. Jarnagin died from cholera at 1 A.M. on the morning of June 25, 1851 in Memphis. He was interred in that city's Elmwood Cemetery.

U.S. Senate
Preceded by Alexander O. Anderson	U.S. senator (Class 2) from Tennessee; October 17, 1843 – March 3, 1847; Served alongside: Ephraim H. Foster and Hopkins L. Turney	Succeeded by John Bell
