= Benjamin F. Keene =

3rd President pro tempore of the California State Senate
- In office January 8, 1852 – January 2, 1854
- Preceded by: Elcan Heydenfeldt
- Succeeded by: Royal Sprague

Member of the California State Senate
- In office 1854–1856
- Constituency: 18th district
- In office 1851–1854
- Constituency: 12th district

Personal details
- Born: September 1, 1809 Lynn, Massachusetts, U.S.
- Died: September 5, 1854 (aged 45) Placerville, California, U.S.
- Party: Democratic
- Spouses: Harriet Bell (m. 1831, died); Ann Eliza Frances Reese (m. 1841; died 1843)
- Education: Thomas Jefferson University (MD)
- Occupation: Physician, surgeon

Military service
- Branch/service: First Regiment of Texas Mounted Rifle Volunteers
- Years of service: 1847–1848
- Rank: Corporal
- Battles/wars: Mexican-American War

Benjamin Franklin Keene (September 1, 1809 – September 5, 1854) was an American physician, pioneer, and politician who served in the California State Senate and was the third President pro tempore of the California State Senate. Keene was also the founder of the California Medical Association.

== Biography ==
Keene was born in Lynn, Massachusetts and attended school in Rhode Island. He later learned the trade of medicine with an uncle of his in Nantucket, Massachusetts in 1829, and eventually earned a Doctor of Medicine degree from Thomas Jefferson University. After this he went to Georgia in 1830 where he practiced medicine; establishing a practice in Jasper County and working in some other locations. He married twice with both his wives dying. In 1847 he joined the American forces in the Mexican American War. After the war he went to California where he was for a time a miner in Placerville, California. He later worked as a medical doctor in Placerville.

A Democrat, Keene was elected to the California State Senate in 1850, representing the 12th district. He would be reelected in 1854 to the 18th district. In the Senate, he was the author of a bill that authorized the Governor of California to procure blocks of marble to construct the Washington Monument in Washington, D.C.. Between 1852 and 1854, Keene served as the 3rd President pro tempore of the California State Senate.

Preceded by Elcan Heydenfeldt	President pro tempore of the California State Senate; 1852–1854	Succeeded by Royal Sprague
