= Nathaniel Bennett =

American judge

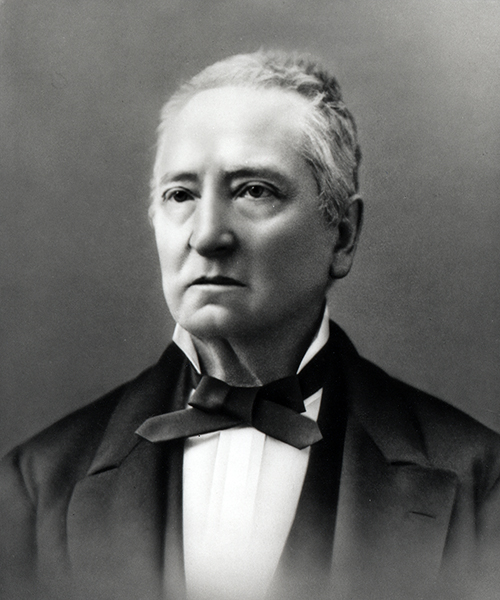

Associate Justice of the California Supreme Court
- In office December 22, 1849 – January 1, 1852
- Appointed by: Legislature
- Preceded by: New office created by adoption of the Constitution of 1849
- Succeeded by: Hugh Murray

Senator from the district of San Francisco, California State Senate
- In office December 15, 1849 – December 21, 1849
- Appointed by: Direct election
- Preceded by: New seat at creation of state
- Succeeded by: David C. Broderick

Personal details
- Born: June 27, 1818 Clinton, New York, U.S.
- Died: April 20, 1886 (aged 67) San Francisco, California, U.S.
- Education: Hamilton College; Yale University (B.A.)

Nathaniel Bennett (June 27, 1818 – April 20, 1886) was one of the first Associate Justices of the California Supreme Court.

== Early life and education ==
On June 27, 1818, Bennett was born in Clinton, New York, to a family of merchants and farmers. Bennett was raised on a farm in Erie County, New York, and beginning at age 12 he attended military academies in Buffalo and then in Canandaigua, New York. In 1835, he studied at Hamilton College for one year, and then completed his degree at Yale University. After graduation, he read law and was admitted to the New York bar in 1840 as an attorney and in 1843 as a counselor. He then engaged in private practice with Eli Cook, whose brother was an attorney in California.

In Bennett's youth, he was a follower of the Democratic Party, but a horseback tour in Fall 1842 of several southern states caused him to switch his allegiance. Questioning his previous politics, he followed the Barnburner faction of the Democratic Party, attending the 1848 convention in Buffalo that nominated Martin Van Buren for President of the United States. In 1856, Bennett joined the Republican Party at its formation.

== Legal and judicial career ==
In January 1849, Bennett and a group of friends decided to move to California. Arriving in June 1849, they went to mine the gold fields on the Tuolumne River. In Fall 1849, he returned to San Francisco and began a law firm with John Satterlee, who was part of the group which moved with Bennett and in 1851 became a judge of the San Francisco Superior Court. After the adoption of the constitution of California in November 1849, Bennett was elected a state senator from the district of San Francisco.

In December 1849, the new legislature elected Bennett, along with Henry A. Lyons, as the first associate justices, and S. Clinton Hastings as chief justice. On December 24, 1849, Bennett resigned his Senate seat to take up his court position. In the winter of 1849–1850, he helped prepare the Senate Judiciary committee report to the Legislature on recommendations on adoption of the civil or common law. One commentator describes Bennett as one "whose decisions alone, among the early justices, show any considerable acquaintance with the Spanish Mexican system." In October 1850, he delivered a speech on the occasion of California statehood before a large crowd in San Francisco. On October 3, 1851, he resigned from the court, having accepted "financial inducements" from a group of influential land owners who were hoping the court would reverse his decision in Woodworth v. Fulton (1850) 1 Cal. 295. His seat was filled by Governor John McDougall with the appointment of Hugh Murray.

During 1851 to 1852, Bennett served as California Reporter of Decisions and, in 1853, he published the first volume of Supreme Court cases.

After leaving the court, Bennett joined a law practice with Horace Hawes, William G. Wood, and Elisha Cook (the brother of Eli Cook, his former partner in New York) in the firm of Hawes, Wood & Cook. In 1852–1853, Bennett returned home to New York to visit his family. On his return to California, he continued to practice law, including real estate title and mining litigation.

In May 1856, Bennett was a delegate from the Fourth Ward of San Francisco and served as president of the Republican Party Convention held in San Francisco. At the convention, the Party nominated him to run again for the California Supreme Court on the same platform as Edward Stanly for governor, but he lost the 1857 election for Chief Justice to Stephen J. Field.

After the defeat, in 1858 Bennett returned to Washington, D.C., on business and to his home to New York for two years. In 1859, while in Washington, he successfully argued before the Supreme Court of the United States the pueblo land grant case involving Rancho Corral de Tierra (Vasquez). Back in California, he continued to practice law and appeared many times before the state Supreme Court. In 1863, he advertised a law partnership with H. S. Love, called Bennett & Love. In January 1867, he and Elisha Cook began a law practice and published the Pacific Law Magazine, targeted at the bar. Later, he formed the firm of Bennett, Machin & Owen.

Bennett maintained an active role in public life. In May 1869, he delivered another speech in San Francisco at the completion of the Pacific Railroad. In July 1869, continuing his interest in politics, his name was put forward at the state Republican convention to fill the Supreme Court vacancy from the retirement of Oscar L. Shafter. However, O. L. Pratt received the nomination instead. In October 1879, Bennett ran for Chief Justice of the California Supreme Court under the New Constitution Party, but garnered only one-third of the votes cast for the victor, Robert F. Morrison.

On April 20, 1886, Bennett died in San Francisco, and in his will he bequeathed his volume of Isocrates Orations to the Mercantile Library. The book was referred to as "probably the oldest printed book in California."

== Civic activities ==
Bennett was a member of the Society of California Pioneers.

== Personal life ==
Bennett's wife died a few months before him. They had no children.

== See also ==
- List of justices of the Supreme Court of California
- California Reporter of Decisions
- S. Clinton Hastings
- Henry A. Lyons

Legal offices
Preceded by New office created by adoption of the Constitution of 1849	Associate Justice of the California Supreme Court; 1849–1852	Succeeded by Hugh Murray
Preceded by New seat at creation of state	Senator from the district of San Francisco, California State Senate; November 1849–December 21, 1849	Succeeded by David C. Broderick
