= California Medical Association =

Professional organization of physicians

The California Medical Association (CMA) is a professional organization based in California that advocates on behalf of more than 50,000 physician members in legislative, legal, regulatory, economic, and social issues. The organization was founded in 1856 and is a member of the American Medical Association. The group's members can access 5,000 pages of information in the organization's health law library.

== History ==
The CMA and its leaders:

- Started the state public health department in the 1870s;
- Made immunizations compulsory for school-children in the 1880s;
- Began looking at ways to fund healthcare for the poor in the 1930s;
- Performed what were some of the first cornea transplants, and set up some of the first organ transplant guidelines in the country; and
- Started California's first medical schools, which later became Stanford University School of Medicine and the University of California San Francisco School of Medicine (UCSF School of Medicine).

=== Organization ===
On 12 March 1856, the Medical Society of the state of California held its first meeting at Pioneer Hall on "J" Street in what is now Old Town Sacramento. The society's first president, Benjamin F. Keene, M.D.—also a state senator representing El Dorado County—led the meeting of 1875.

Following the 1850 Sacramento cholera outbreak, the surviving physicians became close colleagues and friends, and they began to establish county medical societies. The first ones were established in Sacramento and San Francisco. Each society stayed in touch, and society secretaries Thomas Logan, M.D. (Sacramento) and Elias Cooper, M.D. (San Francisco)—both historical figures in their own right—organized that historic first meeting in 1856. Dr. Logan, a noted medical scholar, later reorganized the CMA after years of strife, reorganizing the society in 1875 and eventually serving as the state's Director of Public Health as well as president of the CMA and then the American Medical Association. Dr. Cooper, an eye surgeon who had previously co-founded the Illinois Medical Society, would build Stanford University School of Medicine.

A credentials committee was established to "avoid admissions of unsuitable persons" as a result of controversy about which doctors were reputable. The Medical Society's first censor, Dr. Morse, served as the forerunner to the present-day Medical Board of California.

Because travel was difficult in the early years, the society's focus remained in Northern California. Its counterpart, the Southern California Medical Society, was founded in 1898. County societies sprouted up throughout the late 1800s and early 1900s. Membership in the CMA cost $10 in 1900 and included malpractice insurance. To conform to name changes at other state medical associations and the American Medical Association, the society renamed itself the California Medical Association in 1923.

John Frederick Morse, M.D., a historian and journal editor for the medical society who would form some of the first disciplinary and licensing terms for state physicians, is credited with starting the first journal of the Medical Society, starting with his own funds a short-lived publication called the California State Journal of Medicine. There were several revivals of publications over the years. In 1873, the society published the first Transactions of the Medical Society of California, a volume published annually until Volume 31, issued in April 1901. In that year it was recommended that, because the annual transactions were "an extravagant and unnecessary way of perpetuating the proceedings of the society, the more rational one of publishing a monthly journal" be adopted. Thus, The California State Journal of Medicine was revived. In 1924 its name was changed to California and Western Medicine, and in 1946 to California Medicine. Philip Mills Jones, M.D., is regarded as that journal's founder.

The publication changed its name to The Western Journal of Medicine in 1974 as part of a proposal to establish a regional medical journal for the West. The Western Journal has been the official publication of the CMA, six research and specialty societies, and the state medical associations of Arizona, Idaho, Montana, Nevada, Utah, Washington, and Wyoming for more than 20 years. The Journal stopped publishing after the British Medical Journal took over in 1998.

=== Merger with the California Osteopathic Association ===
In 1961, the CMA merged with the California Osteopathic Association. At the time, the CMA consisted of 40 medical societies, which were organized by county; after the merger, the COA became the 41st medical society. In 1975, full CMA membership was offered to qualified osteopathic physicians (D.O.). In 1999, the CMA passed a resolution to work with the current osteopathic medical association, Osteopathic Physicians and Surgeons of California, on issues that concern both M.D. and D.O. physicians. In 2005, the CMA opposed efforts to consolidate the D.O. and M.D. medical boards.

=== Medicine ===
The physicians who founded the Medical Society of the State of California were veterans in the fight against cholera, encephalitis, typhoid and smallpox—diseases that became prevalent in the newly minted lands of California after the Gold Rush of 1849. They dedicated their organization to "promote the science and art of medicine, protection of public health, and the betterment of the medical profession."

A deadly cholera epidemic struck Sacramento in October 1850. Despite their unfamiliarity with these diseases, physicians remained committed to helping their patients. About 5,000 people in Sacramento and the surrounding areas died of cholera, and thousands of others deserted the area in fear of the disease.

Dr. Morse noted physicians' remarkable commitment: "Not one educated physician turned his back upon the city in its distress and threatened destruction." The dead in the cholera epidemic included seventeen physicians, a third of the physician population of California. They are memorialized in a plaque at the historic Sacramento City Cemetery, with only one of them buried in a marked grave.

The CMA also helped to establish some of the first blood banks and cornea banks in the West and helped create the California Tumor and Tissue Registry in 1947—what is today the second largest tumor and tissue registry in the world.

=== Politics and activism ===
During the 20th century and beyond, the CMA has fought against tobacco use and smoking and insisted early on—in the face of criticism and fear of the newly found disease—that HIV and AIDS patients deserve needed health care. The CMA also advocated for broader immunization against disease and the implementation of the Affordable Care Act.

In 1975, the CMA preserved access to care for many when it forged ahead on a plan to keep medical malpractice rates affordable. Hearing the outcry of CMA physicians who had faced rate increases up to 400 percent, threatening practice viability, Governor Jerry Brown called together a special session of the legislature to discuss the malpractice cost crisis. They passed that year a collection of statutes called the Medical Injury Compensation Reform Act (MICRA), a model for national medical liability reform. At the insistence of CMA physicians, MICRA kept patients whole and ensured compensation for their injuries while setting a cap on non-economic damages, going a long way in keeping malpractice insurance premiums affordable. CMA continued the fight to protect MICRA against a ballot measure funded by trial lawyers, eventually contributing to the loss of Proposition 46 in the November 2014 general election.

By the 1960s, it was clear to the CMA that the managed care industry needed oversight and regulation. In the 1970s, the CMA sponsored a key piece of legislation, the Knox-Keene Health Care Services Act. The law instituted financial and quality standards for HMOs, set a basic minimum benefit package, required plans to ensure continuity of patient care, and protected the physician-patient relationship in health care decisions. In 2000, the CMA sponsored AB 1455, which gave the Department of Managed Health Care the authority to levy penalties and fines against health plans that engage in unfair business and payment practices.

While the CMA had made some progress in the Legislature, physicians were frustrated that despite three decades of legislative and regulatory efforts, health plans still ran roughshod over physicians and patients often could not get the care they needed. In 2000, in a historic action, the CMA filed a Racketeer Influenced and Corrupt Organizations Act (RICO) lawsuit against for-profit HMOs in California, alleging that they were using fraud and other illegal activities to interfere in the physician-patient relationship. Eventually, more than 800,000 physicians and 19 state and county medical association's joined the CMA as plaintiffs, becoming the largest class action health care lawsuit in U.S. history.

Of the 10 defendants, six settled (including the now merged Anthem/Wellpoint/Blue Cross), and three had their cases dismissed by the court. The settling health plans agreed to pay a combined $585 million in monetary damages. But of even greater value were the binding commitments made by the insurers to change the way they do business with physicians. These prospective commitments have been valued far in excess of the monetary relief, at well over $1 billion over four years.

In 2015, the CMA co-sponsored California Senate Bill 277, authored by Senator Dr. Richard Pan, which removes the personal belief exemption from school vaccination requirements. The bill was signed into law by Governor Jerry Brown on June 30, 2015. The CMA was also a partner in the Save Lives California coalition, which passed California Proposition 56 (2016) to raise tobacco taxes by $2 per pack. CMA, in conjunction with the California Dental Association, has announced it intends to run a sugary drink tax on the 2020 ballot.

In 2021 Democratic Assemblyman Jim Wood introduced AB 890 to allow nurse practitioners in California to practice without physician oversight. The association, in partnership with conservative advocacy group Physicians for Patient Protection, lobbied against the bill. Governor Gavin Newsom signed the bill into law which goes into effect in 2023.

=== Demography ===
At the medical society's second annual session in 1857, the Committee on Education declared that at the very least German, French—but especially Spanish—should be part of a medical student's education, stating: "In no country in the world is there such a national admixture of languages as this State." CMA began on the principles that all patients of all ethnicities should be treated for their illnesses, and the CMA supplied the nation with some of its first ethnic medical leaders. Just as in 1857, the CMA continues to work toward bridging language and ethnic barriers with patients by placing new physicians in underserved areas of the state through the Stephen M. Thompson Loan Forgiveness Program, and studying the effects of limited English proficiency on patient care.

In recent decades, the CMA House of Delegates approved "mode-of-practice" forums to provide representation for physicians based on the type of practice they are in—solo/small group, medium, large and very large group, academic, hospital-based, or government employed. An ethnic physicians' forum also was established.

Today, the California Medical Association has more than 50,000 members in all modes of practice and specialties representing the patients of California.

== Physicians for a Healthy California (formerly CMA Foundation) ==
The CMA Foundation - renamed Physicians for a Healthy California (PHC) in 2018 - primarily began in 1963 as a charitable arm of the California Medical Association, disbursing over $1 million in grants and loans to medical students. The CMA, while supporting the interests of California's physicians, realized that it was important to help along future physicians during their educational years, and so remained as a source of resources for medical students until 1995, when Dr. Rolland C. Lowe, M.D., CMAF Board Chair, recommended that the Foundation expand its role to encompass community health.

New projects began in 1996 and 1997, such as ComPACT (tobacco education) and the Physician Leadership Recognition Dinner. The Pharmacy Partnership Project, begun in 1996, gathered pharmacists from across California working in independent pharmacies to remove tobacco products from their stores. The project had a nearly 80% success rate (currently 78% of independent pharmacies in California are tobacco free). In July 2000, the Partnership changed its name to Prescription for Change to encourage chain pharmacies to go tobacco free as well. Overall, the mission of this project is to facilitate public education campaigns, advertisements, and media coverage that focus on increasing consumer awareness about pharmacies selling tobacco.

Beginning in 2000, PHC initiated its community involvement by launching the AWARE Project (Alliance Working for Antibiotic Resistance Education), a nationally recognized project. In addition, there are many other health projects, public outreach programs, and physician conferences that point to PHC's commitment to improving the health of California's residents.

== Institute for Medical Quality ==
In January 1996, the California Medical Association launched a new not-for-profit subsidiary, the Institute for Medical Quality (IMQ), to help improve the quality of care delivered to patients in California. Its programs include ambulatory care facility accreditation, the Consolidated Accreditation and Licensure Survey program, continuing medical education accreditation and certification, correctional health care accreditation and membership, peer review consultations, extensive educational programs and research.

== Audio-Digest Foundation ==
The Audio-Digest Foundation is a continuing education provider that was an affiliate of the California Medical Association (CMA).

In January 2008, Audio-Digest Foundation and Marathon Multimedia became Learners Digest International (LDI). LDI was formed by Housatonic, who acquired and consolidated these two businesses formerly owned by the California Medical Association. In August 2015, LDI was acquired by Wolters Kluwer Health Division for $150 million cash.

The organization was established in 1953 and was founded by Jerry Lyle Pettis. It currently employs 70 full-time staff members and is based in Glendale, California. The organization produces continuing medical education/continuing education (CME/CE) audio programs for physicians and health care professionals who subscribe. Programs are published on 15 specialties. These are typically audio tapes of meetings (such as seminars, short courses at universities, conferences and symposia) at which experts present new research.

The organization is accredited to provide continuing education to physicians by the Accreditation Council for Continuing Medical Education, to nurses (by the American Nurses Credentialing Center's Commission of Accreditation), and to physician assistants (by the American Academy of Physician Assistants, which accepts educational activities by ACCME-accredited organizations up to a certain number of credits).
