= Elcan Heydenfeldt =

American politician

Member of the California State Assembly from the 6th district
- In office April 18th, 1853 – January 1855
- Preceded by: Himself
- In office January 1853 – April 1, 1853
- Succeeded by: Himself

2nd President pro tempore of the California State Senate
- In office January 9, 1851 – January 8, 1852
- Preceded by: E. Kirby Chamberlain
- Succeeded by: Benjamin F. Keene

Member of the California State Senate from the 6th district
- In office 1851–1853

Personal details
- Born: September 15, 1821 Charleston, South Carolina, U.S.
- Died: February 23, 1898 (age 76) San Francisco, California, U.S.
- Party: Whig
- Relatives: Solomon Heydenfeldt (brother)

Elcan Heydenfeldt (September 15, 1821 – February 23, 1898) was an American politician who served in the California State Assembly and California State Senate.

Heydenfeldt was elected to the state senate in 1850, representing San Francisco, and was elected its second president pro tempore. He was then elected to the state assembly's 6th district in 1852, being the first person to go from serving in the state senate to the state assembly.

In 1853, Heydenfeldt and four other assemblymembers all resigned their seats. All but one, including Heydenfeldt, then all ran in the special elections for the vacant seats, and were reelected.

California Supreme Court justice Solomon Heydenfeldt was his brother.

Preceded by E. Kirby Chamberlain	President pro tempore of the California State Senate; 1851-1852	Succeeded by Benjamin F. Keene
