= Charles Henry Bryan =

American judge (1822–1877)

Associate Justice of the California Supreme Court
- In office November 24, 1854 – November 15, 1855
- Appointed by: Governor John Bigler
- Preceded by: Alexander Wells
- Succeeded by: David S. Terry

Senator from the 15th Senatorial district of the California State Senate
- In office January 1854 – March 1854
- Appointed by: Direct election

Personal details
- Born: October 20, 1822 Ellicottville, New York, U.S.
- Died: May 14, 1877 (aged 54) Carson City, Nevada, U.S.
- Relations: John A. Bryan, father; John B. Weller, brother-in-law

Charles Henry Bryan (October 20, 1822 – May 14, 1877) was a politician and jurist in California, who served as an associate justice of the California Supreme Court.

== Biography ==
Bryan was born on October 20, 1822, in Ellicottville, New York. By 1833, the family moved to Ohio. He was well educated and read law. His father, John A. Bryan, was a United States diplomat, and his brother-in-law, John B. Weller, was a United States Senator and Governor of California.

In September 1851, Bryan ran for District Attorney of Yuba County against incumbent Jesse O. Goodwin. In June 1852, he was elected a delegate to the state Democratic convention held in Benicia, California, on July 20, 1852. In 1854, Bryan was elected as a Democratic member of the California State Senate from the 15th Senatorial district.

Afterwards, Governor John Bigler appointed Bryan as an associate justice of the Supreme Court of California to finish the unexpired term of Alexander Wells, which position Bryan held from November 24, 1854, to November 15, 1855. In September 1855, the Democratic Party nominated Bryan for Supreme Court, and the Know Nothing branch of the party nominated David S. Terry, who won the election.

Both during and after Bryan's court service, he remained active in Democratic Party politics. In June 1855 and September 1856, he was a delegate from Yuba County to the Democratic Party state convention. By August 1858, he had joined the Anti-Lecompton Democrat branch of the party. In June 1859, near the outbreak of the American Civil War, he attended the Anti-Lecompton Democrat convention, whose factions culminated in the California gubernatorial election, 1859.

In 1862, Bryan moved to Nevada, and won a franchise to operate a toll road. In 1863, he was a delegate to the State Constitutional Convention. In November 1864, although a life-long Democrat, he campaigned for the re-election of Republican President Abraham Lincoln.

In May 1864, Bryan's prize thoroughbred, Lodi, won a race at San Jose that established her as the fastest horse in the state. On May 23, 1865, at Ocean Race Course outside San Francisco, he raced Lodi against a challenger, Norfolk, and lost. The race was the subject of Mark Twain's short story, "How I Went to the Great Race Between Lodi and Norfolk".

Suffering from severe drinking and gambling problems, Bryan left California to live in Utah. In 1871, he lived in Polk County, Oregon, and raised thoroughbred horses, after having won a large contingency fee case there.

In 1875, he returned to Virginia City, Nevada. He died May 14, 1877, in Carson City, Nevada, with no wife or children but survived by a brother, Marshall Bryan, of New York.

== See also ==
- List of justices of the Supreme Court of California
- Hugh Murray
- Solomon Heydenfeldt

Legal offices
Preceded by Alexander Wells	Associate Justice of the California Supreme Court; 1854–1855	Succeeded by David S. Terry
Preceded by	Senator in the 15th Senatorial district of the California State Senate; January – March 1854	Succeeded by
