= Bernard E. Witkin =

American lawyer (1904–1995)

- Born: Bernard Ernest Witkin; May 24, 1904; Holyoke, Massachusetts, U.S.
- Died: December 23, 1995 (aged 91); Berkeley, California, U.S.
- Education: University of California, Berkeley (BA, LLB)
- Occupations: Lawyer, writer, scholar
- Employer: California Supreme Court
- Known for: Treatise on California law
- Spouse: Alba Pichetto Kuchman (m. 1978) Frances Jane Kauffman Lemert (m. 1969; died 1977) Gladys Burke Schwatka (m. 1957; div. 1968) Elizabeth "Betty" Ord Hillier (m. 1937; div. 1956)
- Children: Cara Monson, Lucy Davaly, Joel Witkin
- Parent(s): Albert Witkin; Pauline Horvitz
- Website: Witkin Legal Institute

Bernard Ernest Witkin (May 22, 1904 – December 23, 1995) was an American lawyer and author. He is best remembered as the founder of the California law treatise, Summary of California Law, which came to be known as "Witkin" and gave rise to the Witkin Library of legal treatises.

== Biography ==
In 1928, Witkin was an unhappy law student at Boalt Hall (UC Berkeley) who thought that the Socratic method used in law school teaching was not an efficient way to learn the law. He seldom went to class and was in danger of flunking out. About the time the dean told him he needed to shape up, Witkin had an epiphany: law is like any other discipline; it has rules that can be taught. He thought legal education should be more like science education and should teach students the rules of the discipline in an organized way. As Samuel Williston and Arthur Linton Corbin had done with their treatises on contracts, Witkin's approach was to reduce case law to black letter rules. He created an outline for each of his courses and started selling his notes to his fellow students.

Following graduation, Witkin took a job with a law firm in San Francisco for two years, while continuing to develop and sell his outlines. Following that job, Witkin clerked for the California Supreme Court. At the same time, he started to teach a bar review course. He later clerked for the Chief Justice of the California Supreme Court. Around the same time, Witkin developed his outlines into a lengthy hardcover book arranged by subject matter.

In 1940, Witkin became the California Reporter of Decisions. In that role, Witkin standardized the rules of appellate practice and wrote the California Style Manual. Later he became interested in judicial education and legal reform. Over the years, his Summary of California Law grew into four inter-related treatises, which still reflect his original work.

In 1968, Witkin gave a speech roasting each member of the California Supreme Court.

== Honors and legacy ==
Witkin's treatises continue to be updated by the Witkin Legal Institute. Among many other honors, the California State Law Library is named in his honor. His collection of science fiction publications is held by the University of California, Davis Library. Just prior to his death in 1995, he and his wife received the Benjamin Ide Wheeler Award for service to the City of Berkeley. On March 27, 1983, Loyola Law School awarded Witkin the St. Thomas More Medallion, with speeches by former justices Otto Kaus and Donald R. Wright.

In San Diego, the Law Library Justice Foundation holds an annual awards ceremony in honor of Bernard E. Witkin. The Bernard E. Witkin Award honors members of the legal community for civic leadership and excellence in teaching, practice, enactment, or adjudication of the law.

== Personal life ==
In 1937, Witkin married Elizabeth "Betty" Ord Hillier; they divorced in 1956. He married Gladys Burke Schwatka in 1957; they divorced in 1968. In 1969, he married Frances Jane (née Kauffman) Lemert (m. 1969), an arts patron, who died on August 10, 1977. In 1981, Witkin donated her art collection to the Crocker Art Museum in Sacramento, California.

In 1978, he married Alba Kuchman (née Pichetto; November 15, 1919 – December 26, 2014), with whom he established his charitable foundation.

== See also ==
- California Reporter of Decisions
