= John A. Bryan =

American diplomat and politician

United States Assistant Postmaster General
- In office 1843–1843
- President: John Tyler
- Preceded by: Philo C. Fuller
- Succeeded by: J. Washington Tyson

Member of the New York State Assembly from the Cattaraugus County district
- In office 1827–1827

Ohio State Auditor
- In office 1833–1839
- Governor: Robert Lucas
- Preceded by: Ralph Osborn
- Succeeded by: John Brough

Personal details
- Born: John Alexander Bryan; April 13, 1794 Berkshire County, Massachusetts
- Died: May 24, 1864 (aged 70) Menasha, Wisconsin

John Alexander Bryan (April 13, 1794 in Berkshire County, Massachusetts – May 24, 1864 in Menasha, Wisconsin) was an American diplomat and politician from New York and Ohio.

He moved to Ellicottville, New York, and was a member of the New York State Assembly (Cattaraugus Co.) in 1827.

Then he moved to Columbus, Ohio, and was Ohio State Auditor from 1833 to 1839. In 1840, Bryan settled at, and co-founded, what would become the city of Bryan, Ohio. He was U.S. Chargé d'Affaires to Peru in 1845.

Later he lived in Milwaukee and Menasha, Wisconsin. He served as editor of The Daily Milwaukee News. He was buried in Neenah, Wisconsin.

His son, Charles Henry Bryan, was a California State Senator, and his son-in-law John B. Weller was a U.S. Senator from California.
