= Serranus Clinton Hastings =

American judge and politician (1814-1893)

Serranus C. Hastings
- Hastings c. 1881

3rd Attorney General of California
- In office January 5, 1852 – January 2, 1854
- Governor: John Bigler
- Preceded by: James A. McDougall
- Succeeded by: John R. McConnell

1st Chief Justice of California
- In office December 20, 1849 – December 1851
- Preceded by: Office established
- Succeeded by: Henry A. Lyons

3rd Chief Justice of the Iowa Supreme Court
- In office January 26, 1848 – January 14, 1849
- Preceded by: Joseph Williams
- Succeeded by: Joseph Williams

Member of the U.S. House of Representatives from Iowa's at-large district
- In office December 28, 1846 – March 3, 1847
- Preceded by: District established
- Succeeded by: District abolished

Personal details
- Born: November 22, 1814 Watertown, Jefferson County, New York
- Died: February 18, 1893 (aged 78) San Francisco, California
- Party: Democratic
- Spouse: Azalea Brodt
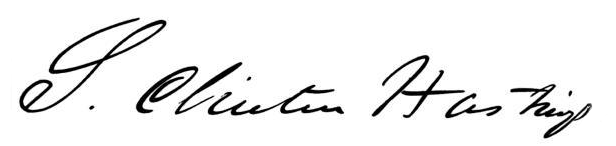
- Signature

Serranus Clinton Hastings (November 22, 1814 – February 18, 1893) was an American politician, rancher, and lawyer in California. Born in Watertown, New York, he studied law as a young man and moved to the Iowa District in 1837 to open a law office. Iowa became a territory a year later, and he was elected a member of the House of Representatives of the Iowa Territorial General Assembly. When the territory became the state of Iowa in 1846, he won an election to represent the state in the United States House of Representatives. After his term ended, he became Chief Justice of the Iowa Supreme Court.

After one year in office, Hastings resigned and moved to California. He was appointed to the California Supreme Court as Chief Justice a few months later. He won an election to be Attorney General of California, and assumed office shortly after his term as Chief Justice ended. He began practicing law again as Attorney General. He earned a small fortune with his law practice and used that fortune to finance his successful real estate ventures. In 1878, he founded the Hastings College of the Law (now University of California College of the Law, San Francisco) with a donation of $100,000 (equivalent to $3,340,000 in 2025).

Responding to press reports about Hastings' involvement in killing and dispossessing Yuki people in the 1850s, a commission of Hastings College of the Law concluded in 2020 that Hastings participated in the California genocide in Mendocino County, California. The commission initially opposed a change in the name of the college, but in November 2021, the Board of Directors of UC Hastings voted to change the name of the institution.

== Early life ==
Hastings was born in Watertown, Jefferson County, New York, on November 22, 1814, to Robert Collins Hastings and Patience Brayton. Robert Collins Hastings was a good friend and supporter of DeWitt Clinton, from whom Serranus got his middle name. When Robert died in 1824, the family moved to St. Lawrence County, New York. He completed a six-year course at Gouverneur Academy, and in 1834, he taught and became the principal at Norwich Academy, located in Chenango County, New York. He introduced the Hamiltonian system of instruction and the Angletean system of mathematics to the academy. In 1835, he resigned from his position at the academy to study law.

Hastings began to study law with Charles Thorpe, Esq., of Norwich. After a few months of study, he decided to move to Lawrenceburg, Indiana. He completed his legal studies there with Daniel S. Majors, Esq. He did not immediately enter the practice of law and instead became an editor of the Indiana Signal, where he supported Martin Van Buren in his presidential campaign. He moved to Terre Haute, Indiana, in December 1836 and underwent a legal examination by Judge Porters of the Circuit Court.

== Career ==
Engraving by John Chester Buttre c. 1846–1847

In January 1837, Hastings moved to the Iowa District, which was part of the Wisconsin Territory. He settled in Burlington for a short time and then moved to Bloomington, which would later become Muscatine, Iowa. He was examined by Judge Irwin, was admitted to the bar, and opened a law office. Shortly after this, he was commissioned Justice of the Peace by Wisconsin Territorial Governor Henry Dodge. He had jurisdiction over the 90 miles between Burlington, Iowa, and Davenport, Iowa, the western boundary was undefined. He only had one case to deal with: a man accused of stealing US$30 from a citizen and $3 from the court. He found the man guilty and sentenced him to be tied to an oak tree, receive 33 lashes across his back, be transported across the Mississippi River to Illinois, and be banished from the territory forever. When Iowa Territory was organized in 1838, he won an election to represent Muscatine County, Louisa County, and Slaughter County in the House of Representatives of the Iowa Territorial General Assembly. He served from November 12, 1838, to January 25, 1839. He was reelected to that position in 1839, this time representing Muscatine County and Johnson County from November 4, 1839, to January 14, 1840. In 1840, a border conflict with Missouri called the Honey War took place. He received the military title of Major and helped capture a sheriff. No battle took place, and the two states compromised on the border issue.

Hastings married Azalea Brodt on June 10, 1840, in Muscatine, Iowa. They had two children while living in Muscatine, Marshall and Clara L. He was elected to the Legislative Council that year, representing Muscatine County and Johnson County again, and served from November 3, 1840, to January 15, 1841. He was re-elected the following year, and served from December 6, 1841, to February 18, 1842. He was not elected to the Fifth and Sixth General Assemblies. He was elected President of the Legislative Council for the Seventh General Assembly, and also represented Muscatine County and Johnson County on the council. He served from May 5, 1845, to June 11, 1845. He was elected to the council for the Eight General Assembly, which was also the final one since Iowa was to become a state on December 28, 1846. He represented the same counties he had previously, and served from December 1, 1845, to January 19, 1846. During his time on the Legislative Council he helped compile the "Blue Book" of Iowa laws. It became known as the "Old Blue Book" and was the first legal code for the Iowa, Nebraska, Dakota, and Montana Territories.

In 1846, Hastings was nominated to represent Iowa at large in the United States House of Representatives as a Democrat. On December 29, 1846, he was elected over the Whig candidate G. C. R. Mitchell. He was the second youngest member serving in Congress at that time. He served during the second session of the 29th United States Congress, which ended on March 3, 1847. Close to a year after his term ended as a member of the House of Representatives, Governor Ansel Briggs appointed him as the third Chief Justice of the Iowa Supreme Court. He started his term on January 26, 1848, and resigned on January 14, 1849, to move to California, his family deciding to stay in Iowa.

Hastings settled in Benicia, California. In September 1849, he served as Prosecuting Attorney for the newly established court in Alameda County. A few months later, California legislature selected him to be the first chief justice of the California Supreme Court. He started his term on December 20, 1849, but the court did not assemble until March 4, 1850. In 1851, his family moved from Iowa to live with him in California. During his term as Chief Justice he ran for the office of Attorney General of California. Elections were held on September 3, 1851, and he won with 52.2% of the votes. The Whig candidate, William D. Fair, received the rest of the votes. His term as Chief Justice ended in December 1851, and he assumed office as Attorney General on January 5, 1852. While serving as Attorney General, he could practice law as well, something he could not do as chief justice. The wealth he earned during this time became the foundation of the larger fortune he would later earn in real estate. He ended his two-year term on January 2, 1854.

== Accused of Native American genocide ==
In 1860 the California Legislature formed a committee to investigate the Round Valley massacres of the Yuki people from 1856 to 1859. The committee obtained statements and documents from a number of individuals, including Serranus Hastings, a large landowner in Round Valley. In his statement Hastings attested that "until the investigations of this committee" he had been "entirely ignorant" of the "outrages" committed by Walter Jarboe and the other members of the Eel River Rangers. However, the same investigation resulted in several mentions of Hastings as being an organizer and financer of Jarboe's Rangers and requesting U.S. military and California government help to suppress the Yukis. In the archives is also a letter from Jarboe to Hastings saying he (Jarboe) planned to attack a group of 500 Indians.

The issue of Hastings' involvement in the massacres became prominent in 2017. The San Francisco Chronicle published an op-ed in which a Berkeley law professor, John Briscoe, reported that a UCLA history professor, Benjamin Madley, had asserted that Hastings had "helped to facilitate genocide" against Native Americans in California by promoting and funding "Indian-hunting expeditions in the 1850s."

The book contains two sentences about Hastings. The first is that Hastings had facilitated the delivery to California Governor John Weller of a petition that requested the governor to commission the organization of a militia company to defend life and property in the Eden and Round Valleys north of Ukiah. The second is: "[Walter] Jarboe engaged men to hunt Indians, promising them payment from the state, or if Sacramento failed to pay, from the operation’s extremely wealthy mastermind, Judge Hastings, who owned an Eden Valley ranch and may have wanted to eliminate the Yuki [Indians who lived in and around the Eden and Round Valleys] in order to protect his stock."

Brendan Lindsay in Murder State: California’s Native American Genocide, 1846-1873, Univ. of Nebraska Press (2012), offered a judgment regarding Serranus Hastings's purported involvement in the indiscriminate killing of Yuki Indians in the Eden and Round Valleys: "Hastings and many others used the democratic process and the structures of republican government to call for and execute a massive genocide of 'Indians' during the second half of the nineteenth century. Hastings and his fellows committed, directly and indirectly, some of the foulest depredations that men have committed against their fellow men in human history."

David Faigman, Chancellor of Hastings College, appointed a Legacy Review Committee to advise him and hired Lindsay to write a "white paper" to inform the dean and the members of the committee regarding Hastings' involvement in the killing of Yuki Indians in the Eden and Round Valleys. In May 2018 Lindsay delivered his white paper. Faigman distributed Lindsay's executive summary in which he stated:

"[S]ome have charged that he [Serranus Hastings] is responsible in part for fomenting violence and atrocity against California Indians, particularly in and around his holdings in Eden Valley. According to the historical record - including depositions, letters, and statements by Hastings' contemporaries - significant proof exists that this was the case."

"The operation of the company [of men called the Eel River Rangers] seem to have been well known to Hastings. The captain of the Eel River Rangers, Walter S. Jarboe, a notoriously violent "Indian fighter," kept Hastings apprised of the Rangers' activities in back-channel reports . . . For Hastings, Henley, and the local white population, the operations of the Rangers were a huge success."

Faigman had a series of interactions with descendants of the Yuki and other Indians who had resided in the Eden and Round Valleys in 1859 that he described collectively as "restorative justice." In July 2020 the members of the Legacy Review Committee issued a report in which they accepted, as did Faigman, the verdict Lindsay rendered regarding Hastings, and lauded the "restorative justice" actions Faigman had initiated. However, with one dissenter, the members of the committee recommended that the name of UC Hastings College of the Law not be changed.

Fifteen months later, on October 27, 2021 The New York Times published a story that featured a photograph of Faigman and reported that he had "led a campaign to keep the school's name." At Faigman’s instigation, the members of the Hastings Board of Directors held a "special meeting" six days after the article was published, during which they reversed their earlier decision and passed a motion that accused Serranus Hastings of promoting and funding "genocide against members of the Yuki Tribe and other Native Californians," and directed Faigman "to work with the California Legislature, the Governor's Office, and other offices to enact legislation changing the name of the school." The board has since appointed a committee to advise the members of the board whether they should reconsider their passage of that motion.

In February 2022 in the California Legislature, Assembly Member James Ramos introduced Assembly Bill 1936 and Senator Tom Umberg introduced Senate Bill 1288, bills whose enactment will direct that Hastings College of the Law be renamed. The bills differ in that SB 1288 renames the school College of the Law, while AB 1936 directs that a new name be "determined by the Board of Directors of the college, the Round Valley Tribal Council, and Yuki Indian Committee." The Council and the Committee expressed a desire for the school to be given a Yuki name; however, Faigman pressed for the school to be renamed "UC San Francisco School of Law." As a consequence, at his urging, and over the protestation of the Round Valley Tribal Council and the Yuki Indian Committee, on April 6, 2022, the members of the Senate Education Committee favorably reported SB 1288. Faigman released a statement on the name change on May 25, saying that consultation with the Council and Committee would take place in June. On November 2, 2021, the Board of Directors for the University of California, Hastings College of the Law, voted unanimously to remove Serranus Clinton Hastings from the name of the college. On July 27, 2022, the board of directors voted unanimously to rename the college the University of California College of the Law, San Francisco (UC Law SF). The name change bill was signed into law by Governor Newsom on September 23, 2022. The transition to the new name of the college took place in 2023.

=== Defense of Hastings ===
A defense of Hastings was published in 2023 stating "there is no assertion and no evidence that [Hastings] killed, or knew in advance of any plan to kill, Indians. In fact, he testified under oath in the legislature's 1860 investigation into the Mendocino Indian Wars that he had no knowledge of any Indian killings before they occurred, and that the militia that committed the killings he is now accused of was appointed and controlled by the California Governor.

"Rather, Hastings used the California law of the time to help settlers petition the Governor to establish a local police force (the militia), which was charged with protecting his and the other settlers' lives and property."

The article also states that "the school's leadership's decision to change the name had more to do with money and political clout than weighing against his alleged shortcomings objective factors that compared a notable individual's contributions to society and the school," and that "the school's leadership and California's legislature and governor simply accepted as gospel what the New York Times said about him [...]"

== Later life ==
Hastings continued to practice law after his term as Attorney General ended, and also became a member of the Henley, Hastings & Co. bank firm located in Sacramento, California. The banking firm failed, though with little loss to Hastings himself. Around 1857, he left professional life, and started investing in real estate. He and his wife had seven more children after this: Charles Foster Dio., Douglas, Uhler, Robert Paul, Flora Azalea, Ella, and Lillie. He gradually acquired around one hundred lots of real estate in San Francisco, and bought large tracts of land in Solano, Napa, Lake, and Sacramento counties. He later sold some of this land in Napa County to former Railroad Commissioner Charles J. Beerstecher. In 1861, Hastings put up many four-room buildings in the south side of San Francisco for the poor with the money he earned in real estate. The rent was $10 a month, and as a business venture it was a success. By 1862, he was worth $900,000, which was largely attributed to his real estate investments. In 1865, he traveled to Europe; four years later he accompanied William H. Seward to view the recently purchased territory of Alaska.

Hastings College of Law, which later became part of the University of California, was founded on March 28, 1878, from his donation of $100,000. The college offered him the position of dean and he accepted the offer. He was professor of comparative jurisprudence at the college as well, a position he held until 1887. He helped establish St. Catherine Academy in Benicia, California, with a donation of $6,000. He also helped publish two volumes of the botany of the Pacific coast. His contribution to botany would later be recognized by having the plant genus Hastingsia named after him.

Hastings died at the age of 78 on February 18, 1893, in San Francisco, California. He was buried at St. Helena Public Cemetery in St. Helena, California.

== See also ==
- Henry A. Lyons
- List of justices of the Supreme Court of California
- Nathaniel Bennett

U.S. House of Representatives
New district	Member of the U.S. House of Representatives from Iowa's at-large congressional district December 29, 1846 – March 3, 1847	District eliminated
Legal offices
Preceded by Joseph Williams	3rd Chief Justice of the Iowa Supreme Court; January 26, 1848 – January 14, 1849	Succeeded by Joseph Williams
New office	1st Chief Justice of California; December 20, 1849 – December 1851	Succeeded by Henry A. Lyons
Preceded by James A. McDougall	3rd Attorney General of California; January 5, 1852 – January 2, 1854	Succeeded by John R. McConnell
