= Alexander Wells (California judge) =

American judge (1819–1854)

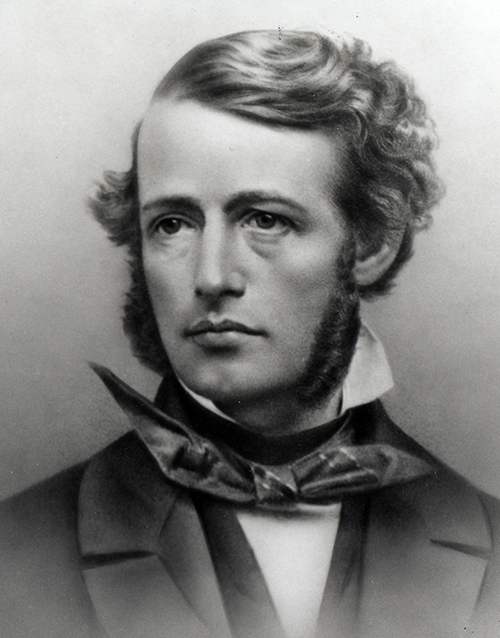

Associate Justice of the California Supreme Court
- In office January 3, 1853 – October 31, 1854
- Preceded by: Alexander O. Anderson
- Succeeded by: Charles Henry Bryan

Member of the New York State Assembly for New York Co.
- In office January 1, 1846 – December 31, 1846

Personal details
- Born: October 7, 1819 New York City, New York, U.S.
- Died: October 31, 1854 (aged 35) San Jose, California, U.S.
- Spouse: Annie Van Rensselaer Van Wyck (m. 1846)

Alexander Wells (October 7, 1819 – October 31, 1854) was an associate justice of the Supreme Court of California.

== Early life ==
Wells was born on October 7, 1819, in New York City.

== Career ==
He was admitted to the bar about 1842, and practiced law in New York City. He also entered politics as a Democrat, and was a member of the New York State Assembly in 1846.

About 1850, he moved to California. In April 1852, he was appointed a temporary Associate Justice of the California Supreme Court, to serve during the absence of Justice Solomon Heydenfeldt, and remained on the bench until October.

In 1852, he won the Democratic nomination in a special election for Associate Justice of the Supreme Court of California, defeating the incumbent Alexander O. Anderson who had been appointed to the vacancy caused by the resignation of Henry A. Lyons. On November 2, 1852, Wells was elected for the remainder of the term, which expired at the end of 1854. In 1854, he was nominated for election to a full term, but died before the election. One historian summed up his judicial career as follows: "The sixth associate justice, Alexander Wells, who came to the bench in 1853 at the age of 59, [sic] died a year later, leaving no published legal mark on the court".

== Personal life ==
On October 7, 1846, he married Annie Van Rensselaer Van Wyck (1822–1919), the daughter of Philip Gilbert Van Wyck (1786–1870) and Mary Smith (née Gardiner) Van Wyck (1788–1858). Her paternal grandparents were Catherine Van Cortlandt (1751–1829) and Abraham Van Wyck (1748–1786) and her uncles were Pierre Van Cortlandt Van Wyck and David Gardiner. Wells was introduced to Annie by her cousin, Stephen Van Rensselaer. Together they had:

- Ann Van Cortlandt Wells (1848–1848), who died young.
- Gertrude Van Cortlandt Wells (1849–1944), who married Schuyler Hamilton, Jr. (1853–1907), the son of Schuyler Hamilton and grandson of Alexander Hamilton, in 1877. Before their divorce in 1884, they had three children. In 1901, she married the Baron Raoul Nicholas de Graffenried. He was the son of Baron Emanuel de Graffenried, Ambassador from Switzerland to Austria, and his wife, Baroness Gabrielle de Barco, lady-in-waiting to the Empress of Austria, assassinated at Geneva, while traveling the Swiss Alps. They divorced in 1908.
- Grady Wells (1852–1854), who died young.

Wells died suddenly on October 31, 1854, at his home in San Jose, California. In 1903, his widow inherited the estate of her sister, Joanna L. Van Wyck, estimated at several million dollars.

== See also ==
- List of justices of the Supreme Court of California
- Hugh Murray
- Solomon Heydenfeldt

Legal offices
Preceded by Alexander O. Anderson	Associate Justice of the California Supreme Court; 1853–1854	Succeeded by Charles Henry Bryan
