= E. Kirby Chamberlain =

American politician

1st President pro tempore of the California State Senate
- In office 1849–1851
- Preceded by: Position established
- Succeeded by: Elcan Heydenfeldt

Member of the California State Senate for the Los Angeles district
- In office 1849–1851

Personal details
- Born: April 24, 1805 Litchfield County, Connecticut, US
- Died: 28 December 1852 (aged 47) Near Acapulco, Mexico
- Party: Non-partisan
- Spouse: Susan Pennock Clark
- Education: Columbia University

Ephraim Kirby Chamberlain (April 24, 1805 – December 28, 1852) was a politician in California. He served in the California State Senate and was President pro tempore of the California State Senate in 1849.

Chamberlain was born in Colebrook, Connecticut on April 24, 1805. His parents moved to Elbridge, New York in 1815, and Chamberlain was raised and educated in Elbridge. He graduated from New York City's College of Physicians and Surgeons in 1828. He subsequently established a medical practice in New Brighton, Pennsylvania. In 1836, Chamberlain married Susan Pennock Clark (d. 1846). In 1841, he moved to Cincinnati, where he continued to practice medicine.

During the Mexican–American War he served in the U.S. Army as surgeon of a volunteer regiment from Ohio. After the war, he was one of the commissioners named to establish the border between California and Mexico. After arriving in California, Chamberlain became involved in several businesses, including gold mines. When California attained statehood, Chamberlain was elected to represent the San Diego area in the first state senate, and was chosen to serve as the body's president pro tempore.

While on a trip to San Francisco, Chamberlain became ill in Panama. He died aboard ship near Acapulco on December 28, 1852, and was buried at sea.
