= California Reporter of Decisions =

Reporter of Decisions of California
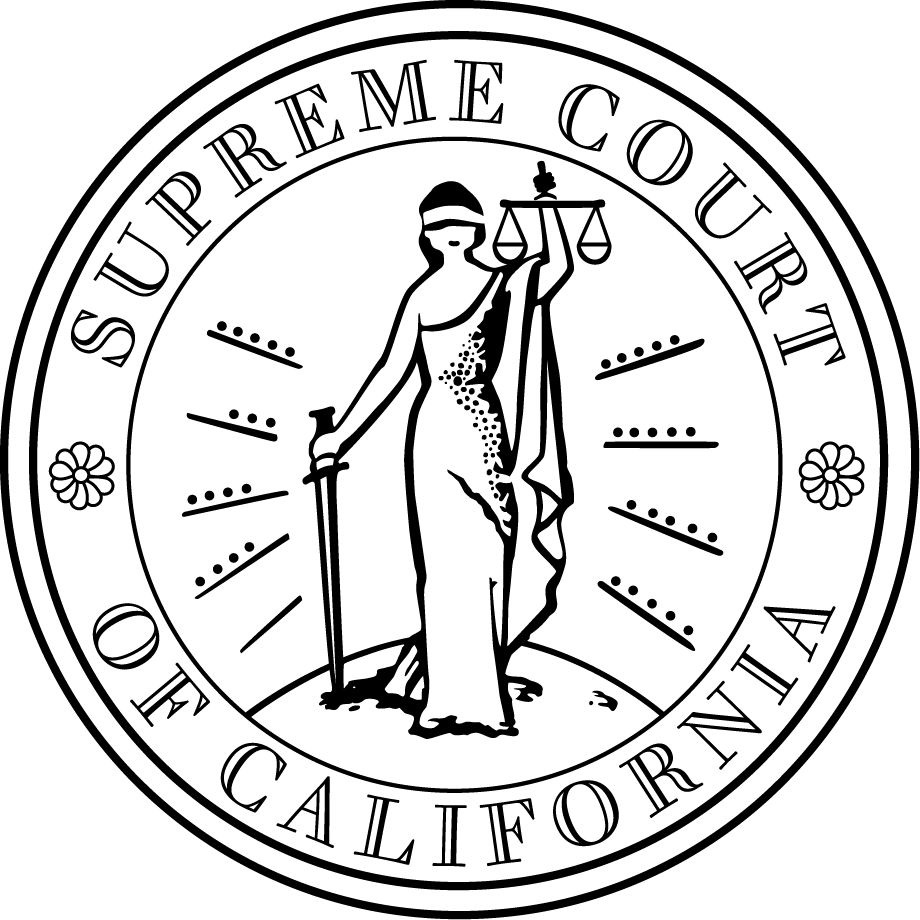
- Incumbent; Lawrence W. Striley since 2014
- Reports to: Supreme Court of California
- Inaugural holder: Edward Norton
- Formation: 1850

The California Reporter of Decisions is a reporter of decisions supervised by the Supreme Court of California responsible for editing and publishing the published opinions of the judiciary of California. The Supreme Court's decisions are published in official reporters known as California Reports and the decisions of the Courts of Appeal are published in the California Appellate Reports.

== List of Reporters ==
Name	Term
Edward Norton	1850–1851
Nathaniel Bennett	1851–1852
Rufus A. Lockwood	1852
H. P. Hepburn	1852–1854
Wm. Gouverneur Morris	1855
H. Toler Booraem	1856–1858
Harvey Lee	1858–1859
John B. Harmon	1859–1860
David T. Bagley	1860–1862
Curtis J. Hillyer	1862–1863
Charles A. Tuttle	1863–1867
J. E. Hale	1867–1869
Tod Robinson	1869
R. Aug. Thompson	1870–1871
Charles A. Tuttle	1871–1878
G. J. Carpenter	1878
George H. Smith	1879–1882
W. W. Cope	1883–1887
C. P. Pomeroy	1887–1917
Randolph V. Whiting	1917–1940
B. E. Witkin	1940–1949
Wm. Nankervis, Jr.	1949–1969
Robert E. Formichi	1969–1989
Edward W. Jessen	1989–2014
Lawrence W. Striley	2014–present
