= Warner Cope =

American judge (1824–1903)

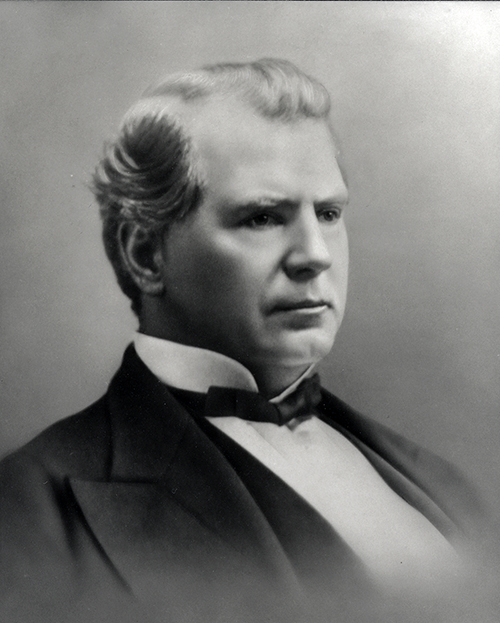

6th Chief Justice of California
- In office May 20, 1863 – January 2, 1864
- Preceded by: Stephen J. Field
- Succeeded by: Silas W. Sanderson

Associate Justice of the California Supreme Court
- In office September 20, 1859 – May 20, 1863
- Appointed by: Governor John B. Weller
- Preceded by: David S. Terry
- Succeeded by: Edwin B. Crocker

Personal details
- Born: January 31, 1824 Kentucky, U.S.
- Died: January 17, 1903 (aged 78) San Francisco, California, U.S.
- Spouse: Martha Ann Neal (m. 1845)

Warner Walton Cope (January 31, 1824 – January 17, 1903), also known as W. W. Cope, was the sixth Chief Justice of California.

== Biography ==
Born in Kentucky, Cope came to California in 1850 and tried mining, but found little success. In 1853 he resumed work as an attorney, first in El Dorado County and the next year in Jackson, Amador County. In October 1858, he was elected to the California State Assembly from Amador as a Democrat.

In June 1859 he was nominated by Alvinza Hayward, also of Amador County, to be the candidate of the Democratic Lecompton Party for associate justice of the Supreme Court of California. In September 1859, he was elected, but before his term was to begin he was appointed by Governor John B. Weller to fill a vacancy on the court starting September 20, 1859, when David S. Terry resigned to fight a duel. He became Chief Justice on March 11, 1863, filling the vacancy after President Abraham Lincoln appointed Stephen J. Field to the U.S. Supreme Court. Cope himself left the court at the end of that year when a constitutional amendment required new judicial elections.

In 1877, Cope was a judge on the Fourth District Court. In 1880, he was a delegate to the Democratic Party state convention. In 1883, Cope became the California Reporter of Decisions, and in March 1885 was appointed to a four-year term as commissioner of the Supreme Court.

After leaving the court, Cope returned to private practice until about 1893, when he retired to Contra Costa County, where he raised nuts and fruit. He died in San Francisco on January 17, 1903.

== Bar activities ==
From 1880 to 1885, Cope was president of the San Francisco Bar Association.

== Personal life ==
On April 19, 1845, Cope married Martha Ann Neal in Shelby County, Kentucky. He traveled to California in 1850, and his wife followed in 1856. They had three sons and three daughters. One of his sons, Walter B. Cope, was a Santa Barbara County Superior Court judge and a prominent California lawyer in the firm of Morrison, Cope & Brobeck. Like his father, Walter also served as president of the San Francisco Bar Association, from 1906 to 1909.

== See also ==
- List of justices of the Supreme Court of California
- California Reporter of Decisions
- Stephen Johnson Field
- Joseph G. Baldwin
- Edward Norton
- Edwin B. Crocker

Legal offices
Preceded by Stephen J. Field	Chief Justice of California; 1863–1864	Succeeded by Silas Sanderson
Preceded by David S. Terry	Associate Justice of the California Supreme Court; 1859–1863	Succeeded by Edwin B. Crocker
