= Medical Injury Compensation Reform Act =

The Medical Injury Compensation Reform Act (MICRA) of 1975 was a statute enacted by the California Legislature in September 1975 and signed into law by Governor Jerry Brown in September. This Act was intended to lower medical malpractice liability insurance premiums for healthcare providers in California by decreasing their potential tort liability.

MICRA's stated justification, in turn, was to keep healthcare providers as a whole financially solvent, thus lowering the cost of healthcare services and increasing their availability. MICRA's constitutionality was repeatedly challenged during the 1970s and 1980s, but most of it was eventually upheld as constitutional under rational basis review by the Supreme Court of California or the California Courts of Appeal. Almost all of MICRA is still in effect and still part of California law, though many of its provisions were updated in 2022 by AB 35.

== History ==
In 1975, soaring malpractice insurance premiums culminated in Argonaut Insurance Company of Menlo Park no longer extending group coverage to Northern California doctors. Individual policies costed 400% more. A physicians' strike began on May 1 and the end was announced May 28. The Governor called a special session of the California Legislature on medical liability, with his proposals becoming the Medical Injury Compensation Reform Act of 1975 (MICRA).

== Provisions ==
=== Damage cap ===
Non-economic damages are limited to $250,000. Non-economic damages include claims for pain and suffering, loss of consortium, both of which permit the financial recovery for losing limbs, losing sight or hearing, the ability to walk, and all other losses that do not directly relate to economic losses.

Only two other states, Kansas and Montana, have a cap on non-economic damages in medical malpractice cases as low as California's. In 21 states and the District of Columbia there is no cap on medical malpractice damage awards. (That includes two states, Maine and Oregon, that have no specific cap on medical malpractice damages but have a cap on noneconomic damages in any wrongful death action.) Six other states have no cap on medical malpractice damages under some circumstances. Florida joined that list in 2014 when the Florida Supreme Court struck down its cap on non-economic damages in medical malpractice cases involving wrongful death.

California law does not include any provision to adjust the cap for inflation, so it has remained at $250,000 since it was enacted in 1975. Seven states with a cap (Idaho, Maryland, Michigan, North Carolina, South Carolina, Virginia and West Virginia) have a statutory provision for increasing that cap over time, adjusting for inflation or other factors.

=== Attorney's fee ===
Attorney fees that are taken from the amount of the settlement are limited. The plaintiff's attorneys cannot receive more than 40% of the first $50,000 recovered; 33-1/3% of the next $50,000 recovered; 25% of the next $500,000 recovered; and 15% of any amount recovered in excess of $600,000. Recovered "means the net sum recovered after deducting any disbursements or costs incurred in connection with prosecution or settlement of the claim….the attorney's office-overhead costs or charges are not deductible costs for such purpose."

=== Time limits ===
It has a shortened statute of limitations for actions against healthcare providers.

=== Periodic payments ===
Doctors are allowed to pay the award over time, as codified by a number of different locations in the California Codes: Business & Professions Code Section 6146, Civil Code Sections 3333.1 and 3333.2, and Code of Civil Procedure Section 667.7.

== Results ==
A RAND report estimates that defendants' liabilities were reduced by 30% as a result of MICRA. Between 1985 and 1988, malpractice premiums rose 47 percent. After 1988, the insurance premiums in California experienced a decrease. It is contested as to whether this decrease was a result of Proposition 103. Proposition 103 enacted Section 1861.01 of the California Insurance Code, which explicitly required the rollback of insurance premiums by "at least 20%".

== Influence ==
The perceived success of MICRA in helping California healthcare providers stay financially solvent in turn inspired similar tort reform initiatives in other states. A prominent example was Nevada's Question 3, which was enacted by the voters of that state in 2004 by a 60% majority. Like MICRA, Question 3 set a maximum schedule for attorney's fees, and capped noneconomic damages at a slightly higher number, $350,000. Question 3 was also known as the KODIN Initiative after its main sponsor, Keep Our Doctors In Nevada. KODIN promoted Question 3 by pointing to an alleged trend of Nevada doctors fleeing the state for states with lower malpractice premiums like California. To directly counter KODIN, the Nevada plaintiffs' bar put Questions 4 and 5 on the same ballot, and both 4 and 5 were defeated.

== Controversy ==
There is an argument that government regulation and restriction on jury awards in medical malpractice suits is detrimental to the public and primarily protects insurance companies. The rationale behind this argument is that regulation of jury awards has substantially decreased (1) the average amount of the award and (2) the number of suits actually filed, but has not created a correlating decrease in malpractice insurance rates. (See RAND Report, supra.) Thus, the benefit to the public is negligible. However, as a result of government regulation, juries may be prevented from awarding an amount that the jury feels is fair. The attorney is prevented from contracting for a price that he feels is fair. As a practical effect, fewer attorneys are willing to take medical malpractice cases. Regulation also has emboldened malpractice insurance carriers to take cases all the way to trial, instead of settling the cases, because their potential exposure is capped. This significantly increases the cost of litigation. Those attorneys who do take medical malpractice cases are very careful only to take very large damages cases. The end result has the practical effect to preventing people who have legitimate, but smaller, malpractice complaints from ever finding an attorney - thus effectively limiting many victims' access to the courts.

Malpractice victim advocates, plaintiffs in malpractice lawsuits and trial attorneys, particularly the Consumer Attorneys of California (CAOC), have continuously fought against MICRA since its inception. Due to the $250,000 cap on non-economic damages, lawyers' fees are also restricted due to the attorney fee percentage cap. In late 2013, Bob Pack, a former NetZero executive, along with Consumer Watchdog and the Consumer Attorneys of California, launched a campaign to place a California ballot proposition onto the November 2014 ballot. This campaign was largely funded by trial lawyers across California. The No On Prop 46 campaign was largely funded by insurance companies, hospitals, and doctors.

Supporters of the initiative reported submitting an estimated 830,000 signatures on March 24, 2014, versus the requirement of 504,760 valid signatures. The initiative was certified on May 15, 2014 by the California Secretary of State.

On November 4, 2014, Proposition 46 failed, with 67% of voters rejecting the measure. California Proposition 46 would have raised the MICRA cap to current inflation standards (approximately $1.1 million), with future annual adjustments. Supporters of the measure included California Senator Barbara Boxer, Congresswoman Nancy Pelosi, Consumer Advocate Erin Brockovich, Consumer Federation of California, Candace Lightner, Founder of Mothers Against Drunk Driving, and the Congress of California Seniors. Many of California's health, medical, business and community organizations, including the California Medical Association, the California Teachers Association, Planned Parenthood, and community clinics and health centers, were in opposition to the ballot measure.

== Constitutional debate after enactment ==
Eight years after MICRA’s enactment, the first case decided by the California Supreme Court was American Bank & Trust v. Community Hospital, 33 Cal. 3d 674 (1983). In a 4-3 opinion, the majority found that the periodic payment provision violated equal protection, because it treated malpractice plaintiffs differently from other plaintiffs that sued for personal injuries. Immediately after this decision, the health care providers petitioned for rehearing, which was granted — a rare occasion. This time, the Court decided 4-3 the opposite way.

== Proposed "Fairness for Injured Patients Act" initiative ==
In 2019, a new coalition (including Consumer Watchdog and trial lawyers Nicholas Rowley and James Harrison) filed paperwork for a new "Fairness for Injured Patients Act" ballot initiative, which would have removed MICRA's cap on noneconomic damages. In January 2020, the initiative's sponsors submitted signatures to qualify the initiative for the November 2020 general election ballot; however, they later withdrew the signatures and filed to place the initiative on the November 2022 general election ballot due to the outbreak of the coronavirus pandemic.

== AB 35 ==
In April 2022, Assemblymember Eloise Gomez Reyes and State Senator Tom Umberg worked together to draft AB 35, a legislative compromise on MICRA reform. Under AB 35, the caps on non-economic damages will rise and become indexed to inflation. Over the first ten years, the cap on non-economic damages for non-death cases will increase steadily to $750,000, and that for cases involving a death to $1 million; after this, the caps will adjust for inflation annually by 2%. In addition, the limits on contingency fees for plaintiffs' attorneys will be increased and attorneys will be allowed to request a higher fee by filing a motion.

The bill was endorsed by both the Consumer Attorneys of California and Californians Allied for Patient Protection, two groups who opposed each other in the debate over Proposition 46. It was also endorsed by the coalition behind the Fairness for Injured Patients Act, who withdrew their initiative from the ballot one week after the compromise passed both houses of the state legislature. Reporter Dan Walters states that this compromise was reached as a result of fatigue on both sides from an almost five decade long battle over this issue, and fear on both sides that the result of a qualified ballot initiative would have had the voters immutably deciding the issue.

Governor Gavin Newsom signed the bill into law on May 23, 2022.
