= William Shew =

American daguerreotypist and photographer (1820–1903)

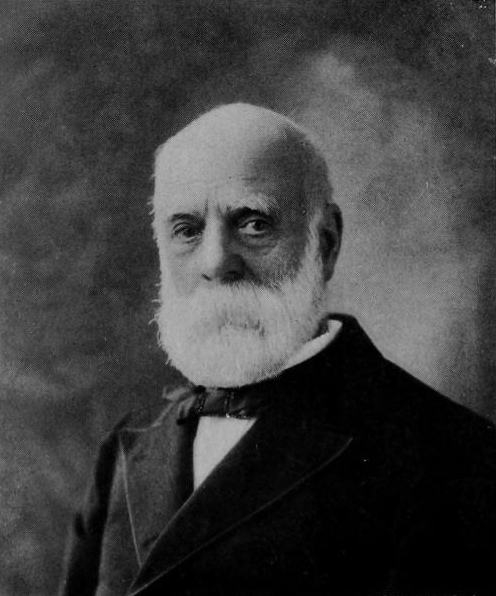
- Shew, c. 1901
- Born: March 23, 1820 near Watertown, New York, U.S.
- Died: February 5, 1903 (aged 82); San Francisco, California, U.S.
- Occupation: Photographer
- Known for: Daguerreotype portraiture; "Daguerreotype Saloon"
- Children: Theodora Alice Shew

William Shew (March 23, 1820 – February 5, 1903) was an American daguerreotypist and photographer active in Boston and San Francisco. He was among the early photographers to work in California and is associated with a mobile studio that he called the "Daguerreotype Saloon". His work included portraiture, views of Gold Rush-era California, and later exhibition photographs shown in San Francisco in the late 1860s.

== Early life and Boston career ==
Shew was born near Watertown, New York, on March 23, 1820. He studied daguerreotype photography with Samuel F. B. Morse, as did his brothers Truman, Jacob, and Myron. All four brothers later worked for photographer John Plumbe. William Shew worked in Plumbe's Boston studio from 1841 to 1844 before establishing a daguerreian case manufacturing business, William Shew and Company, and later working in partnership with daguerreotypist Marsena Cannon.

In Boston, Shew was a member of the Massachusetts Anti-Slavery Society. One surviving work from his eastern career is an 1846 daguerreotype of John Pendleton Kennedy now in the collection of the National Portrait Gallery.

== California career ==
In 1851, Shew followed his brother Jacob to California and established himself in San Francisco. That year he set up a mobile studio on Dupont Street, later moving it to Washington Street opposite the offices of the Alta California newspaper. He referred to the wagon studio as the "Moveable Daguerreotype Saloon". He was also recruited by John Wesley Jones to make daguerreotypes of California for Jones's projected Great Pantoscope of California, the Rocky Mountains, Salt Lake City, Nebraska and Kansas.

Shew later occupied studio addresses on Clay, Montgomery, and Kearny streets as his business expanded. Calmenson identified him as the probable author of the July 1854 article "Photography" in The Pioneer, or California Monthly Magazine, a short essay on the state of photographic practice in San Francisco.

Among Shew's documented California views is a five-part daguerreotype panorama of San Francisco harbor from Rincon Point, made about 1852 and now preserved by the Smithsonian Institution. The panorama shows vessels abandoned in the harbor during the California Gold Rush.

When the first Japanese diplomatic mission to the United States arrived in San Francisco in 1860, Fukuzawa Yukichi sat for a studio portrait with Shew's daughter Theodora Alice Shew.

== Public life ==
Shew was active in local political and civic life during the 1850s and 1860s. On October 8, 1852, he hosted the first San Francisco Free-Soil Convention at his rooms on the Plaza. He also served briefly on the Board of Education and hosted meetings of the Temperance Society.

== Later career and legacy ==
Shew continued to work in San Francisco after the daguerreotype era. Museum records identify later Shew works in albumen print as well as earlier daguerreotypes and ambrotypes. During the late 1860s he exhibited photographs of hydraulic, placer, and quartz mining, as well as views of Lake Tahoe, the Big Trees, Yosemite, Chinese and China subjects, and a set of eclipse photographs at the 1869 Industrial Exhibition in San Francisco.

Shew also photographed destruction caused by the 1868 Hayward earthquake; the Bancroft Library preserves an 1868 view of the San Leandro court house attributed to him. His studio also served as an early training ground for later western photographers. Frank G. Abell began his photography career at Shew's Montgomery Street gallery in the early 1860s.

Shew was the most commercially successful of the Shew brothers. He married Elizabeth Marie Studley in Boston in 1847, and their daughter Theodora Alice was born in 1848. After Elizabeth's death in 1889, he married Annie Katherine Haven in San Francisco in 1891. He died in San Francisco on February 5, 1903.

== Works ==
Selected surviving or documented works by Shew include the San Francisco harbor panorama from Rincon Point, an 1846 portrait of John Pendleton Kennedy, photographs of the 1868 Hayward earthquake, and the 1869 Industrial Exhibition photographs. Another later work attributed to Shew is Untitled (Self-Portrait with Group of Chinese Immigrants, San Francisco), dated about 1882.

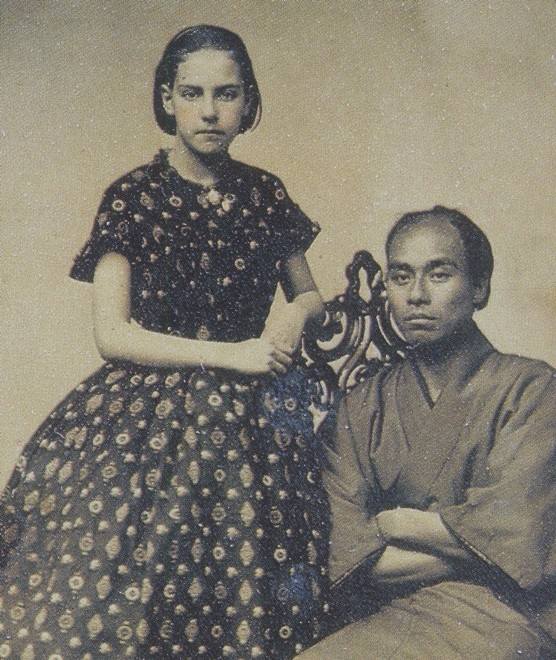
Fukuzawa Yukichi (posing with the photographer's twelve year old daughter: Theodora Alice Shew) in San Francisco, 1860.

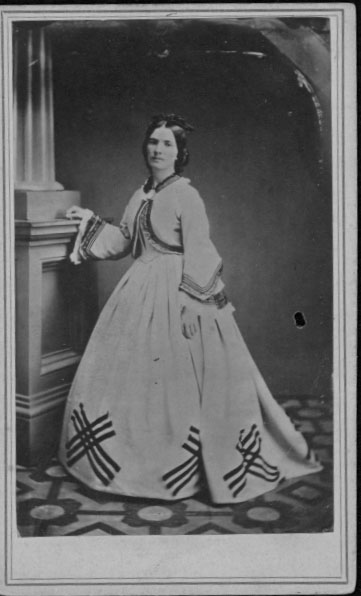
Alice Brown Von Holt Mackintosh

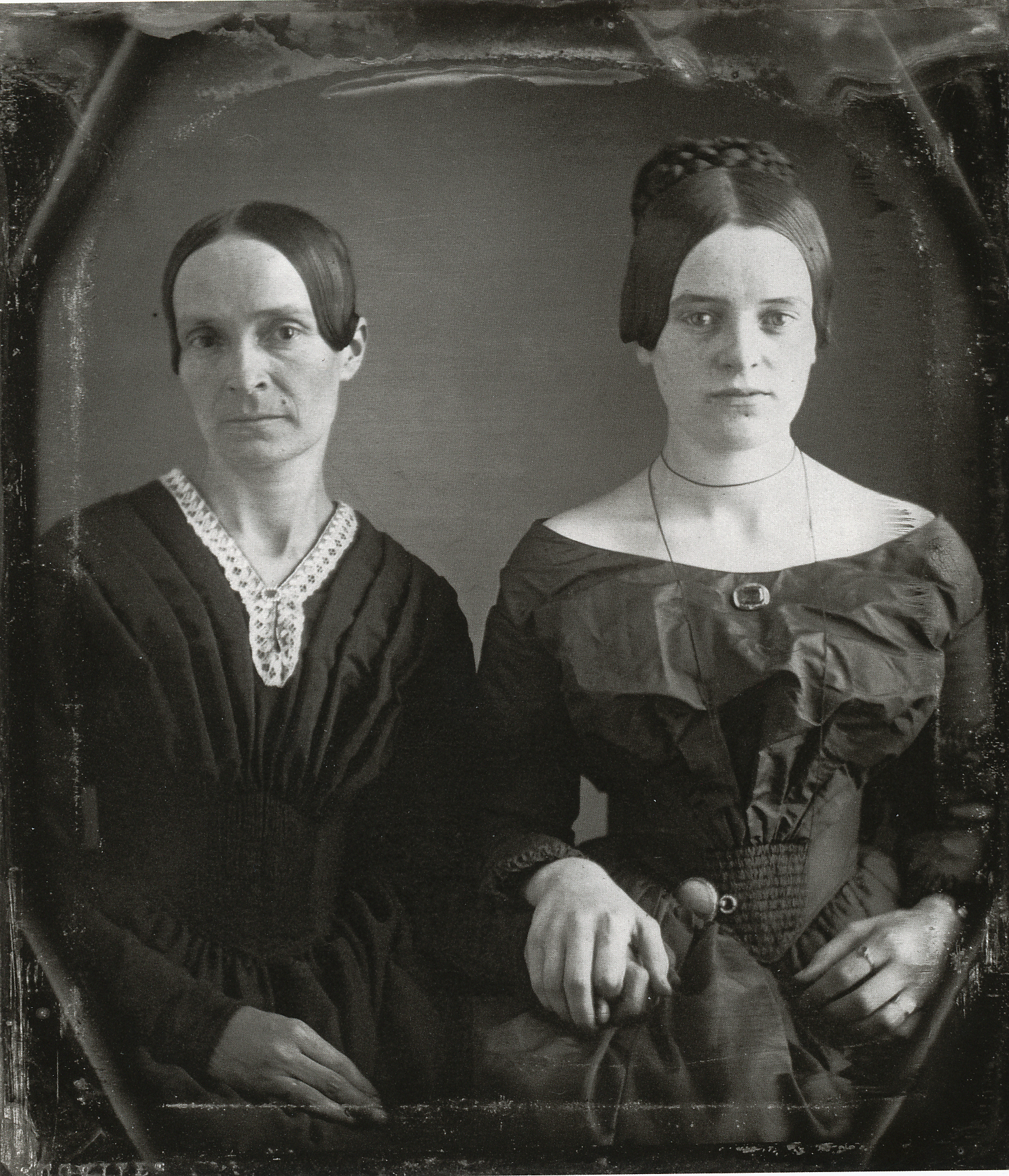
Mother and Daughter

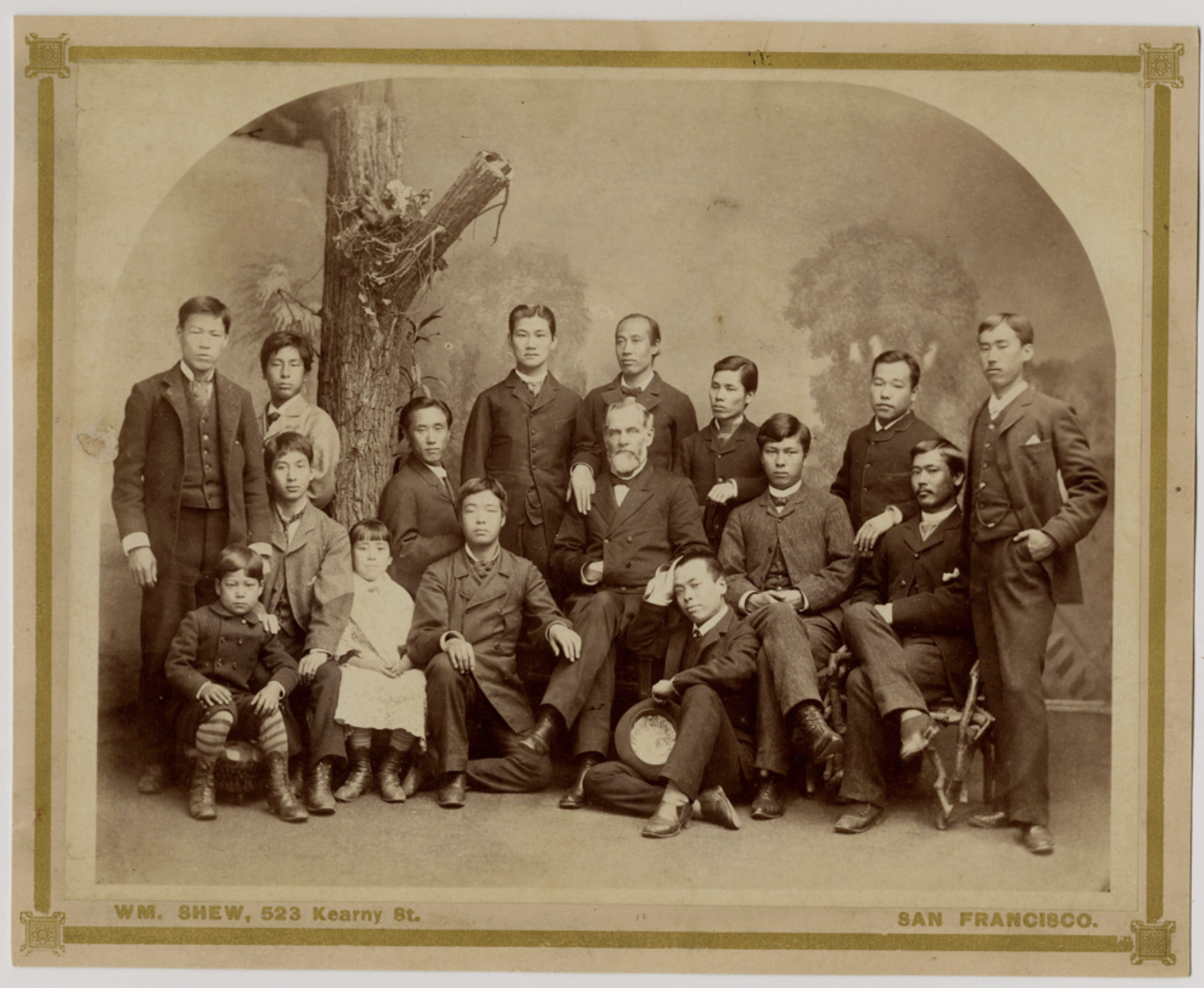
Untitled (Self-Portrait with Group of Chinese Immigrants, San Francisco), c. 1882
