= Hugh Murray (judge) =

American judge

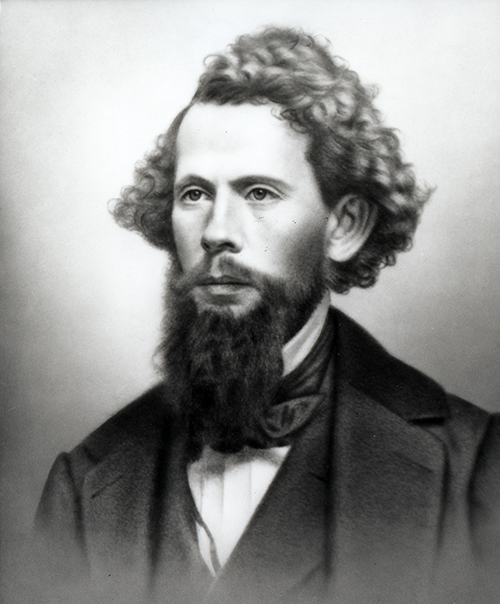

3rd Chief Justice of California
- In office March 1852 – September 18, 1857
- Preceded by: Henry A. Lyons
- Succeeded by: David S. Terry

Associate Justice of the California Supreme Court
- In office October 11, 1851 – March 1852
- Appointed by: Governor John McDougall
- Preceded by: Nathaniel Bennett
- Succeeded by: Stephen Johnson Field

Personal details
- Born: April 22, 1825 St Louis, Missouri, U.S.
- Died: September 18, 1857 (aged 32) Sacramento, California, U.S.

Hugh Campbell Murray (April 22, 1825 – September 18, 1857) was an American lawyer and the third Chief Justice of California.

== Biography ==
Murray was born in St Louis, Missouri before his family moved to Alton, Illinois when he was a child. Little is known of his schooling except that he almost certainly studied Latin. In 1846 he began studying at the law firm of N.D. Strong in Alton. On March 8, 1847, following the outbreak of the Mexican–American War he was commissioned as a second lieutenant in the 14th Infantry Regiment. After the end of the war he resigned his commission on March 31, 1848, and returned to Alton to study.

After completing his studies he was called to the Bar and moved to California, where he gained a large circle of friends and a lucrative practice as a lawyer. On January 8, 1850, at the age of 24, he was elected a member of the San Francisco ayuntamiento (town council), and continued to work as a lawyer. On April 20, 1850, he was made a Judge of the San Francisco Superior Court. On October 11, 1851, at the age of 26, he was made an associate justice of the Supreme Court of California, the youngest ever appointed.

In March 1852, upon the resignation of Henry A. Lyons, he became Chief Justice at the age of 27, the youngest ever Chief Justice of California. He was subsequently elected to another term as chief justice. As Chief Justice, his annual salary in 1854 was US$8,000.

As Chief Justice, he was noted for his dislike of changing the law through his decisions and for his irascible temper. Having heard that a man had called him "the meanest Chief Justice ever," Murray found the man and beat him with his cane. He was consequently fined by the city recorder of Sacramento the sum of $50 plus costs. Murray wrote the majority opinion of the court in People v. Hall, 4 Cal. 399 (1854), which Charles J. McClain describes as "containing some of the most offensive racial rhetoric to be found in the annals of California appellate jurisprudence."

On September 18, 1857, he died in office of consumption. He is interred in Sacramento Historic City Cemetery. In the October 1857 election, Stephen Johnson Field was elected to fill his seat.

== Civic activities ==
He was a member of the Society of California Pioneers.

== See also ==
- Alexander Wells
- Charles Henry Bryan
- Henry A. Lyons
- List of justices of the Supreme Court of California
- Solomon Heydenfeldt

== Bibliography ==
- Camp, Edgar Whittlesey (December 1941). "Hugh C. Murray: California's Youngest Chief Justice". California Historical Society Quarterly. 20 (4). California Historical Society: 365–373. doi:10.2307/25160965. ISSN 0008-1175. JSTOR 25160965.

Legal offices
Preceded by Henry A. Lyons	Chief Justice of California; March 1852 – September 1857	Succeeded by David S. Terry
Preceded by Nathaniel Bennett	Associate Justice of the California Supreme Court; 1851 – March 1852	Succeeded by Stephen Johnson Field
