= Henry A. Lyons =

American judge (1809-1872)

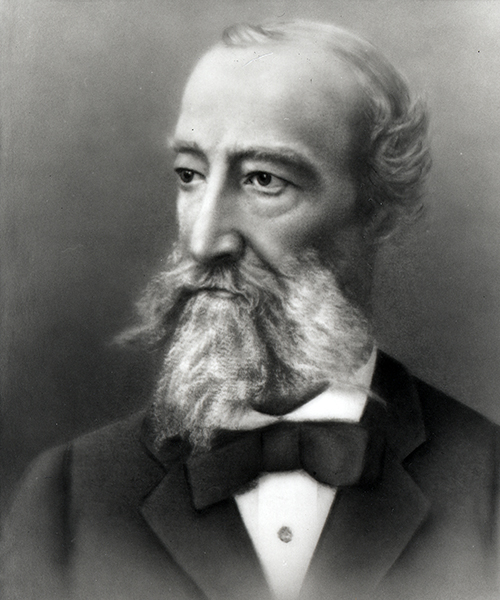

2nd Chief Justice of California
- In office January 1, 1852 – March 31, 1852
- Preceded by: Serranus Clinton Hastings
- Succeeded by: Hugh Murray

Associate Justice of the California Supreme Court
- In office December 1849 – December 31, 1851
- Preceded by: New office created by adoption of the Constitution of 1849
- Succeeded by: Alexander O. Anderson

Personal details
- Born: October 5, 1809 Philadelphia, Pennsylvania, U.S.
- Died: July 27, 1872 (aged 62) San Francisco, California, U.S.

Henry Augustus Lyons (October 5, 1809 – July 27, 1872) was the second Chief Justice of California, appointed to the court by the California State Legislature at the formation of the state. He was the first Jewish justice on the court.

== Background ==
Lyons was one of five sons and a daughter born to Solomon and Sarah (also known as Rebecca) Lyons in Philadelphia, Pennsylvania. Around 1834, Lyons's older brother Zaligman Selwin became an attorney and moved to Jackson, Louisiana. Lyons then followed and settled in St. Francisville. In May 1846, Governor Isaac Johnson appointed Lyons as an aide-de-camp to the commander-in-chief of the Louisiana militia during the Mexican–American War. In April 1849, Lyons lost a lawsuit over a promissory note for $2,200 he signed in April 1843 in West Feliciana Parish, Louisiana.

Lyons married Eliza Pirrie in 1840. Pirrie was already twice a widow and had a boy, Robert Hillard Jr, from her first husband Robert Hillard, and two children (Isabelle and James Pirrie Bowman) with her second husband William Robert Bowman. Together with Lyons, they had three daughters and a son: Lucy Pirrie, Cora August and Eliza (who died in childhood in 1853), and Henry A. Lyons, Jr. In 1851, Lyons's wife died aged 46. On February 27, 1891, his daughter, Cora, died in San Rafael, California, at the age of 46, the same age as her mother.

== Career in California ==
Lyons left his family to travel to California during the Gold Rush, ultimately settling in the Sonora area. In 1849, he ran for State Senate. In 1849, he sought a seat on the newly formed state Supreme Court. An experienced attorney, he came in second for the votes by the state Senate for the California Supreme Court (behind Justice Serranus Clinton Hastings). Hastings had a two-year term ending in 1852, and Lyons then took over as chief justice. Lyons resigned as Chief on March 31, 1852, after serving only three months. Lyons wrote a total of eleven opinions during his term on the Court: nine as an associate justice and two as Chief.

After his term, Lyons remained active in politics but did not return to practicing law. Instead, he focused on his business interests in San Francisco and mining ventures. In June 1852, Lyons served as a delegate from California to the Democratic National Convention held in Baltimore, Maryland.

Lyons died on July 27, 1872, in San Francisco.

== See also ==
- List of Jewish American jurists
- List of justices of the Supreme Court of California

Legal offices
Preceded by Serranus Clinton Hastings	Chief Justice of California; January 1, 1852 – March 31, 1852	Succeeded by Hugh C. Murray
Preceded by New office created by adoption of the Constitution of 1849	Associate Justice of the California Supreme Court; 1849 – 1851	Succeeded by Alexander O. Anderson
