= California Proposition 7 =

California Proposition 7 may refer to:

- California Proposition 7 (1911), Senate Constitutional Amendment No. 22
- California Proposition 7 (1924), Boxing and Wrestling Contests
- California Proposition 7 (1978), Death Penalty Act
- California Proposition 7 (2008), Standards for Renewable Resource Portfolios

== See also ==
- Proposition 7 (disambiguation)
