= List of California ballot propositions =

The following is a list of California ballot propositions broken down by decade. Propositions can be placed on the ballot either through the exercise of the initiative power by the voters or by a vote of the state legislature. The state initiative power was added to the California constitution by Proposition 7, which was approved by voters in a special election on October 10, 1911, as part of the Progressive Era reforms instituted by Governor Hiram Johnson.

== By decade ==
- 1880–1889
- 1890–1899
- 1900–1909
- 1910–1919
- 1920–1929
- 1930–1939
- 1940–1949
- 1950–1959
- 1960–1969
- 1970–1979
- 1980–1989
- 1990–1999
- 2000–2009
- 2010–2019
- 2020–2029

== History ==
Ballot measures were not numbered prior to the general election of 1914. Until the November 1982 general election, proposition numbers started with "1" for each election. After November 1982, subsequent propositions received sequentially increasing numbers until November 1998 when the count was reset to "1". Starting with November 1998, the count is reset in 10-year cycles.

Until 1960, citizen-led initiative measures appeared on general election ballots only. From 1960 to 2012, initiative measures appeared on primary, general, and special election ballots. In October 2011, Governor Jerry Brown signed into law a bill (Senate Bill No. 202) which requires all future ballot initiatives to be listed only in general elections (held in November in even-numbered years), rather than during any statewide election. Two propositions had already qualified for the next statewide election (which was the June 2012 presidential primaries) prior to the signing of the law, making the June 2012 primaries the last statewide non-general election in California to have statewide initiatives on the ballot. Propositions originating in the State Legislature can still appear on non-general election ballots, as was the case with Propositions 41 and 42 in June 2014.

=== Notable propositions ===
Some notable propositions which have become part of the Constitution of the State of California:

Proposition (year)	Status	About
Proposition 4 (1911)	Passed	Granting women the constitutional right to vote in California.
Proposition 7 (1911)	Passed	Establishing the constitutional direct democracy powers of initiative and referendum in California.
Proposition 8 (1911)	Passed	Establishing the constitutional direct democracy power of recall in California.
Proposition 14 (1964)	Passed, declared unconstitutional in 1967, and repealed in 1974	Prohibiting government agencies from denying, limiting, or abridging the right of any property owner to decline to sell, lease, or rent residential real property to any person the property owner, in their absolute discretion, chooses. It was declared unconstitutional in 1967, and repealed in 1974 via Proposition 7
Proposition 7 (1974)	Passed	Clarified existing rights and laws within the California Constitution, deleted obsolete provisions, and added federal rights into the California Constitution. Repealed Proposition 14
Proposition 13 (1978)	Passed	Significant property tax reduction and limits; imposing 2/3 vote requirement of the Legislature for state taxes and 2/3 voter approval requirement for local special taxes.
Proposition 65 (1986)	Passed	Notification of hazardous materials.
Proposition 98 (1988)	Passed	School funding (requires minimum percentage of budget to be directed toward education with increases based on inflation).
Proposition 184 (1994)	Passed, upheld in 2003, and amended in 2012	Mandatory sentencing for third-strike convictions. Proposition 184 was upheld as constitutional in 2003, and was amended by Proposition 36, in 2012
Proposition 187 (1994)	Passed, declared unconstitutional in 1997, and killed in 1999. Unenforceable provisions repealed in 2014	Denying illegal immigrants eligibility to receive public services (immediate stay was federally imposed and is still in effect). Proposition 187 was declared unconstitutional in 1997, and mediation by Governor Gray Davis from a Ninth Circuit Court of Appeals lawsuit, in 1999, effectively killed the law. In 2014, the unenforceable provisions of Proposition 187 were repealed by California Senate Bill 396
Proposition 209 (1996)	Passed	Banning affirmative action in the public sector (employment, education, etc.)
Proposition 215 (1996)	Passed	Legalizing medical marijuana under California law.
Proposition 218 (1996)	Passed	Right to vote on local taxes; assessment and property-related fee reforms; initiative power expansion in regard to local revenue reduction or repeal. Constitutional follow-up to Proposition 13 (1978).
Proposition 22 (2000)	Passed, declared unconstitutional in 2008, and repealed in 2014	Statutory ban on same-sex marriage. It was declared unconstitutional, in May 2008, via the In re Marriage Cases, and was repealed in April 2014. Later, in November 2008, a same-sex marriage ban was added to the State Constitution, via Proposition 8, which itself was later struck down as unconstitutional in 2010, in violation of the Fourteenth Amendment's equal protection clause and Due Process Clause, and was repealed in 2024, via Proposition 3
Proposition 71 (2004)	Passed	On the use of stem cells in scientific research.
Proposition 83 (2006)	Passed	Various restrictions of civil liberties for paroled sex offenders (Jessica's Law).
Proposition 8 (2008)	Passed, declared unconstitutional in 2010, and repealed in 2024	Constitutional ban on same-sex marriage in order to override the In re Marriage Cases decision made earlier that year, in May 2008, that legalized same-sex marriage by ruling that Proposition 22 was unconstitutional, leading to its repeal in April 2014. Whilst it did pass, in November 2008, Proposition 8 was later declared unconstitutional in 2010, and was repealed in 2024 with Proposition 3.
Proposition 11 (2008)	Passed. Amended in 2010	Created the California Citizens Redistricting Commission and gave the commission the power to draw the boundaries for California's State Legislature, and Board of Equalisation boundaries, as opposed to the state legislature. Was amended in 2010 allowing the commission the power to the boundaries of California's congressional districts.
Proposition 14 (2010)	Passed	Establishing a non-partisan top-two primary in place of semi-closed party primaries.
Proposition 20 (2010)	Passed	Amended Proposition 11 to allow the Citizens Redistricting Commission to draw the boundaries for California's congressional districts. Propostion 50 passed in 2025 overrode the boundaries drawn by the commission on a one-time basis.
Proposition 36 (2012)	Passed	Reducing the mandatory minimum sentences for most individuals convicted under the state's three-strikes law. Amended Proposition 184
Proposition 47 (2014)	Passed	Redefining some nonviolent offenses as misdemeanors, rather than felonies, as they had previously been categorized. Partially repealed by Proposition 36
Proposition 64 (2016)	Passed	Legalises marijuana for recreational use by adults
Proposition 1 (2022)	Passed	Constitutional right to reproductive freedom
Proposition 3 (2024)	Passed	Constitutional right to same-sex marriage. Repealed Proposition 8
Proposition 36 (2024)	Passed	Modified and increased penalties for drug and theft related crimes, and reclassified certain misdemeanors as felonies. Partly repealed Proposition 47
Proposition 50 (2025)	Passed	A constitutional amendment for a one-time mid-decade redistricting ballot measure which redrew boundaries of the state's congressional districts, overriding the boundaries drawn up by the California Citizens Redistricting Commission following the 2020 United States census.

== See also ==
- Elections in California
