= List of California ballot propositions: 1970–1979 =

This is a list of California ballot propositions from 1970–1979.

== Elections ==
=== June 2, 1970 ===
- 1 – Failed – University Of California Health Science Facilities.
- 2 – Passed – Partial Constitutional Revision: Local Government.
- 3 – Failed – Partial Constitutional Revision: Public Utilities, Corporations And Water Use.
- 4 – Failed – Partial Constitutional Revision: Various.
- 5 – Failed – Partial Constitutional Revision: Future Constitutional Amendments, State Civil Service.
- 6 – Passed – State And County Boards Of Education: Textbooks.
- 7 – Passed – Interest Rate On State Bonds.
- 8 – Failed – Taxation For Schools And Social Welfare.

=== November 3, 1970 ===
- 1 – Passed – The Clean Water Bond Law of 1970.
- 2 – Failed – Vacancies in Specified Constitutional Offices.
- 3 – Passed – State Budget.
- 4 – Failed – Appropriation For Public Schools.
- 5 – Passed – Regents University Of California: Public Meetings.
- 6 – Passed – Teachers' Retirement Fund: Investments.
- 7 – Passed – State Colleges: Speaker Member Of Governing Body.
- 8 – Failed – Superintendent Of Public Instruction.
- 9 – Failed – County Superintendent Of Schools.
- 10 – Failed – Interest Rate Limitation.
- 11 – Passed – Chiropractors: Rules.
- 12 – Passed – Compensation Of County Supervisors.
- 13 – Passed – Tax Exemption For Disabled Veterans And Blind Veterans.
- 14 – Passed – State Civil Service.
- 15 – Passed – Partial Constitutional Revision.
- 16 – Passed – Constitutional Amendments.
- 17 – Passed – Partial Constitutional Revision: Social Welfare.
- 18 – Failed – Motor Vehicle Taxation And Revenues.
- 19 – Passed – Usury.
- 20 – Passed – The Recreation And Fish And Wildlife Enhancement Bond Act.

=== June 6, 1972 ===
- 1 – Passed – The Veterans Bond Act Of 1971.
- 2 – Passed – The State School Building Aid And Earthquake Reconstruction And Replacement Bond Law Of 1972.
- 3 – Passed – Right To Assistance Of Counsel.
- 4 – Passed – Open Presidential Primary.
- 5 – Passed – Appointment Of Regents, University Of California.
- 6 – Passed – Naturalized Citizen Voting Eligibility.
- 7 – Passed – Valuation Of Single-Family Dwellings For Tax Purposes.
- 8 – Passed – Chiropractors.
- 9 – Failed – Clean Environment Act.
- 10 – Passed – Partial Constitutional Revision.

=== November 7, 1972 ===
- 1 – Passed – Bonds To Provide Public Community College Facilities.
- 2 – Passed – Bonds To Provide Health Science Facilities.
- 3 – Passed – Environmental Pollution Bond Authorization.
- 4 – Passed – Legislative Reorganization.
- 5 – Passed – School Districts.
- 6 – Passed – Miscellaneous Constitutional Revisions.
- 7 – Passed – Elections And Presidential Primary.
- 8 – Failed – Tax Exemption For Anti-Pollution Facilities.
- 9 – Passed – Bond Vote For Structurally Unsafe School Buildings.
- 10 – Passed – Blind Veterans Tax Exemption.
- 11 – Passed – Right Of Privacy.
- 12 – Passed – Disabled Veterans Tax Exemption.
- 13 – Passed – Workmen's Compensation.
- 14 – Failed – Property Tax Limitations.
- 15 – Failed – State Employee Salaries.
- 16 – Failed – Salaries. California Highway Patrol.
- 17 – Passed – Death Penalty.
- 18 – Failed – Obscenity Legislation.
- 19 – Failed – Marijuana – Removal Of Penalty For Personal Use.
- 20 – Passed – Coastal Zone Conservation Act.
- 21 – Passed – Assignment Of Students To Schools.
- 22 – Failed – Agricultural Labor Relations.

=== November 6, 1973 ===
- 1 – Failed – Tax And Expenditure Limitations.

=== June 4, 1974 ===
- 1 – Passed – Recreational Lands Bond Act.
- 2

=== November 5, 1974 ===
- 1 – Passed – State School Building Aid And Earthquake Reconstruction And Replacement Bond Law.
- 2 – Passed – Charters For Counties And Cities.
- 3 – Failed – Postsecondary Education Commission Personnel – Civil Service.
- 4 – Passed – Regents, University Of California.
- 5 – Passed – Residence Of Local Government Employee.
- 6 – Passed – Property Tax Exemptions.
- 7 – Passed – Declaration Of Rights.
- 8 – Passed – Taxation And State Funds.
- 9 – Passed – Recall Of Public Officers.
- 10 – Passed – Right To Vote.
- 11 – Passed – Miscellaneous Language Changes Regarding Gender.
- 12 – Passed – Public Utilities.
- 13 – Passed – San Diego County Judicial Districts.
- 14 – Failed – State College System.
- 15 – Failed – Low Rent Housing.
- 16 – Failed – Student Tuition, University Of California.
- 17 – Failed – Wild And Scenic Rivers Initiative.

=== June 8, 1976 ===
- 1 – Failed – The State School Building Lease-Purchase Bond Law Of 1976.
- 2 – Passed – Veterans Bond Act Of 1976.
- 3 – Passed – California Safe Drinking Water Bond Law Of 1976.
- 4 – Failed – Bonds To Provide Public Community College Facilities.
- 5 – Passed – Banks, Corporations, Franchises And Insurers-Taxation.
- 6 – Passed – Insurance Company Home Office Tax Deduction.
- 7 – Passed – Taxation of Restricted Historic Property.
- 8 – Passed – Deposit of Public Money In Savings and Loan Associations.
- 9 – Passed – Bingo.
- 10 – Failed – Bonds To Refund State Indebtedness.
- 11 – Passed – Motor Vehicle Taxes--Local Surplus Property.
- 12 – Failed – Interest Rate.
- 13 – Passed – Property Tax Postponement.
- 14 – Passed – Miscellaneous Constitutional Revisions.
- 15 – Failed – Nuclear Power Plants-Initiative Statute.

=== November 2, 1976 ===
- 1 – Failed – Housing Finance Bond Law Of 1975.
- 2 – Passed – Nejedly-Hart State, Urban and Coastal Park Bond Act of 1976.
- 3 – Failed – Residential Energy Conservation Bond Law.
- 4 – Passed – University of California. Competitive Bidding. Grounds for Denial of Admission.
- 5 – Failed – Interest Rates Allowable.
- 6 – Failed – Bills and Statutes-Effective Date. Governor's Consideration. Referendum.
- 7 – Passed – Judges. Censure, Removal, Judicial Performance Commission.
- 8 – Passed – County Superintendents of Schools and Boards of Education.
- 9 – Passed – State Constitutional Offices. Filling Vacancies In. Confirmation.
- 10 – Passed – Property Taxation by Local Governments Whose Boundaries Include Area in Two or More Counties.
- 11 – Passed – Tax Rates on Unsecured Property.
- 12 – Failed – Loans by State for Energy Conservation Improvements in Residential Structures.
- 13 – Failed – Greyhound Dog Racing – Initiative Statute.
- 14 – Failed – Agricultural Labor Relations – Initiative Statute.
- 15 – Passed – Chiropractors, Board of Examiners. Licensing Requirements.

=== June 6, 1978 ===
- 1 – Failed – State School Building Aid Bond Law of 1978.
- 2 – Passed – Clean Water and Water Conservation Bond Law of 1978.
- 3 – Failed – Taxation Exemption – Alternative Energy Systems.
- 4 – Passed – City Charters – Boards of Education.
- 5 – Passed – Administrative Agencies.
- 6 – Passed – Sheriffs.
- 7 – Passed – Local Agencies – Insurance Pooling Arrangements.
- 8 – Failed – Owner Occupied Dwellings – Tax Rate.
- 9 – Passed – Interest Rate – Judgments.
- 10 – Failed – Taxation – Rehabilitated Property.
- 11 – Failed – Taxation – County Owned Real Property.
- 12 – Failed – Constitutional Officers, Legislators and Judges Compensation.
- 13 – Passed – Property Tax Limitation.

=== November 7, 1978 ===
- 1 – Passed – Veterans Bond Act of 1978.
- 2 – Failed – Public Utilities Commission.
- 3 – Passed – State Surplus Coastal Property.
- 4 – Passed – Chiropractors. School Accreditation and License Revocation.
- 5 – Failed – Regulation of Smoking.
- 6 – Failed – School Employees. Homosexuality.
- 7 – Passed – Murder. Penalty.
- 8 – Passed – Post Disaster Taxation.

=== November 6, 1979 ===
- 1 – Passed – School Assignment and Transportation of Pupils.
- 2 – Passed – Loan Interest Rates.
- 3 – Passed – Property Taxation – Veteran's Exemption.
- 4 – Passed – Limitation of Government Appropriations.
