= Proposition 7 =

Proposition 7 may refer to:

- Proposition 7 (Wittgenstein) of Wittgenstein's Tractatus Logico-Philosophicus
- California Proposition 7 (2008) (concerning renewable energy)
- California Proposition 7 (1978) (concerning death penalty)
- California Proposition 7 (1911) (concerning direct democracy)
- California Proposition 7 (2018) (concerning daylight saving time)
