= California Proposition 11 =

California Proposition 11 may refer to:

- California Proposition 11 (1972)
- California Proposition 11 (2008)
- California Proposition 11 (2018)
