= California gubernatorial recall election =

California gubernatorial recall election may refer to:

- 2003 California gubernatorial recall election, in which Governor Gray Davis was recalled and Arnold Schwarzenegger elected in his place
- 2021 California gubernatorial recall election, which unsuccessfully sought to recall and replace governor Gavin Newsom

== See also ==
- 1911 California Proposition 8, which introduced the recall law
