= 1972 California Proposition 19 =

Failed measure to legalize marijuana

Proposition 19
- November 7, 1972
- California Marijuana Initiative (CMI)

Results
Choice	Votes	%
Yes	2,733,120	33.47%
No	5,433,393	66.53%
For
50%–60%
Against
80%–90%
70%–80%
60%–70%
50%–60%

Proposition 19, also known as the California Marijuana Initiative (CMI), was a ballot initiative on the November 7, 1972 California statewide ballot. This was the first attempt to legalize marijuana by ballot measure in the history of the United States. If it had passed, the measure would have removed penalties in the State of California for persons 18 years of age or older for using, possessing, growing, processing, or transporting marijuana for personal use. The California Marijuana Initiative's organizers coordinated a huge grassroots organizing drive to place the measure on the ballot. The initiative qualified for the November statewide ballot in June 1972. The initiative was defeated by the voters with 66.5% No votes to 33.5% Yes votes.

Supporters of Proposition 19 argued that legalization was supported by scientific research and the government's own experts and that enforcing criminal penalties was costing a fortune in taxpayer dollars and ruining the lives of ordinary people. Opponents contended that marijuana was dangerous and unpredictable and that legalization would encourage drug abuse and damage society.

== Effects of the Bill ==
Proposition 19 would have legalized the personal use, possession, and manufacture of marijuana by adults in the state of California. It would not have affected existing laws against sales, other commercial activities, and dangerous behavior. The official ballot summary stated that the measure "Removes state penalties for personal use. Proposes a statute which would provide that no person eighteen years or older shall be punished criminally or denied any right or privilege because of his planting, cultivating, harvesting, drying, processing, otherwise preparing, transporting, possessing or using marijuana. Does not repeal existing, or limit future, legislation prohibiting persons under the influence of marijuana from engaging in conduct that endangers others." Indeed, if Proposition 19 had succeeded in legalizing personal marijuana activities in California, those activities would still have remained criminal violations of Federal law under the Controlled Substances Act.

== Fiscal Impact ==
The cost analysis by California's Legislative Analyst showed no increase in state or local costs. The analysis suggested a potential decrease in state and local criminal justice costs related to marijuana.

== Main Arguments ==
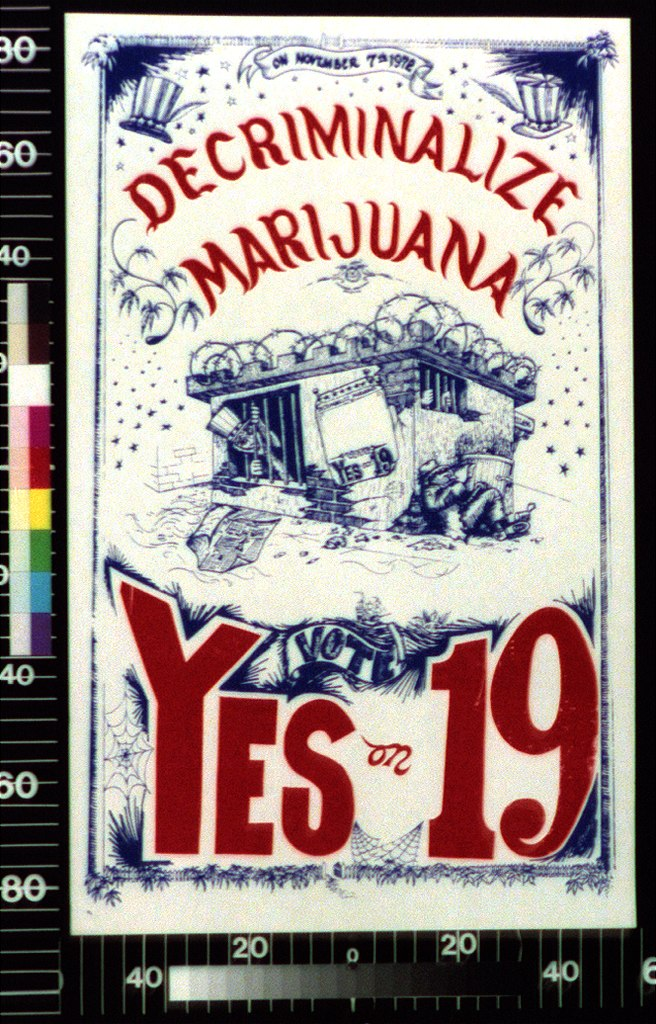
"Yes on 19" campaign poster

Arguments in favor of Proposition 19 were made by Joel Fort, M.D. (Public Health Specialist and Criminologist; former Consultant on Drug Abuse for the World Health Organization), Mary Jane Fernandez (Educator), and Gordon S. Brownell, J.D. (Former Member of White House Staff [1969-1970]). Arguments opposing Proposition 19 were made by H. L. Richardson (State Senator, 19th District) and Dr. Harden Jones, Ph.D. (Professor of Medical Physics and Physiology; Asst. Director of Donner Laboratory, U.C. Berkeley).

Arguments In Favor

- Proposition legalizes personal use activities. It does not legalize sale of marijuana or encourage its use.
- Marijuana has been thoroughly researched and its effects are well understood. Decriminalization is recommended by President Nixon's Shafer Commission and other conservative authorities.
- Marijuana is relatively safe compared to alcohol and tobacco, the two most popular legal drugs.
- Measure will save hundreds of millions in taxpayer dollars through reductions in criminal justice expenditures.
- Current system destroys the lives of hundreds of thousands of normal people for engaging in personal behavior.

Arguments In Opposition

- Laws are deterrents. Legalization will encourage use and abuse.
- Marijuana is poorly researched and understood and has dangerous, unpredictable side effects.
- Marijuana is a gateway drug and potentially addicting.
- Countries that experimented with marijuana legalization experienced negative social consequences and again imposed criminal penalties.
- Marijuana legalization will result in social disintegration.

== History ==
Proposition 19 began in late 1971 as a concept by Foster City attorney Leo Paoli for a ballot initiative to reform California's marijuana laws. Mr. Paoli enlisted the help of Stanford law professor John Kaplan and several leaders of fledgling reform groups including Blair Newman and Mike Aldrich, the founder and the co-director of Amorphia, and Keith Stroup, the founder of the National Organization for the Reform of Marijuana Laws (NORML) as well as Russ Gamlin, Michael Walden of Shasta County, and Peter James, a veterans rights advocate with the Northern California Veterans Coalition. The reformers agreed upon a legalization measure and formed the California Marijuana Initiative (CMI) to lead the drive to obtain the 326,000 signatures required for the initiative's inclusion on the ballot. CMI's statewide efforts were coordinated by two attorneys with grassroots campaign experience: Robert H. A. Ashford, an anti-war activist, and Gordon Brownell, an ex-Republican campaign strategist. The CMI campaign attracted thousands of volunteers and 522,000 signatures by the June deadline.

== Polling History ==
Date of opinion poll	Conducted by	Sample size	Yes	No	Undecided	Margin of error
July 31–August 6, 1972	Field Poll	471	33%	62%	5%	±6.7%
September 29-October 7, 1972	Field Poll	1275	32%	61%	7%	±3%
October 30-November 1, 1972	Field Poll	1467	32%	51%	17%	±3%

== Outcome ==
The California Marijuana Initiative appeared as Proposition 19 on the ballot for California's statewide election held on Tuesday, November 7, 1972. Despite a passionate grassroots movement, supporters of the measure failed to persuade a majority of the electorate and it was defeated. The final voting results were Yes: 2,733,120 (33.5%); No: 5,433,393 (66.5%). However, the initiative did receive 51.26% of the votes in San Francisco County and 71.25% in Berkeley.

== See also ==
- Cannabis in California
- California Proposition 19 (2010)
- Decriminalization of non-medical cannabis in the United States
- List of California ballot propositions 1970–79
