= 2024 California Proposition 3 =

Proposition 3
- November 5, 2024
- Constitutional Right to Marry; Amends California Constitution to recognize fundamental right to marry, regardless of sex or race. Removes language in California Constitution stating that marriage is only between a man and a woman.

Results
Choice	Votes	%
Yes	9,477,435	62.62%
No	5,658,187	37.38%
Total votes	15,135,622	100.00%
Registered voters/turnout	22,595,659	66.98%

Yes
90–100%
80–90%
70–80%
60–70%
50–60%
No
90–100%
80–90%
70–80%
60–70%
50–60%
- Source: Statement of Vote at the Wayback Machine (archived February 10, 2025)

Proposition 3, titled Constitutional Right to Marry, was a California ballot proposition that passed by vote in the 2024 general election on November 5, 2024. The proposition repealed Proposition 8, passed during the 2008 general election, and amended the state constitution to protect same-sex marriage. It also ensured that same-sex couples would have the right to marry in California in case the United States Supreme Court ever overturns Obergefell v. Hodges, thus making it a symbolic gesture until then.

== Text ==
The proposition amended Article I, Section 7.5 of the Constitution of California to read:

~~"Only marriage between a man and a woman is valid or recognized in California.~~ (a) The right to marry is a fundamental right. (b) This section is in furtherance of both of the following: (1) The inalienable rights to enjoy life and liberty and to pursue and obtain safety, happiness, and privacy guaranteed by Section 1. (2) The rights to due process and equal protection guaranteed by Section 7."

== Support ==
In the state voter guide, supporters of the proposition argued that "although marriage equality for same-sex couples has been the law of the land in the United States for years, California’s Constitution still says that same-sex couples are not allowed to marry [and that] recent threats against fundamental rights have made it clear California must be proactive in protecting the freedom to marry regardless of gender or race."

Supporters

Statewide officials

- Gavin Newsom, Governor of California (2019–present)

State legislators

- Toni Atkins, state senator from the 39th district (2016–present) and former president pro tempore (2018–2024)
- Scott Wiener, state senator from the 11th district (2016–present)
- Evan Low, state assemblyman from the 26th district (2014–2024)
- Chris Ward, state assemblyman from the 78th district (2020–present)

Local officials

- Todd Gloria, mayor of San Diego (2020–present)

Political parties

- California Democratic Party
- Libertarian Party of California
- Peace and Freedom Party
- Green Party of California

Newspapers

- Bakersfield Californian
- Long Beach Press-Telegram
- Los Angeles Times
- Pasadena Star-News
- San Gabriel Valley Tribune
- The Mercury News
- The Orange County Register
- The Sacramento Bee
- The San Diego Union-Tribune
- San Francisco Chronicle

Organizations

- ACLU of Northern California
- Equality California
- Human Rights Campaign
- Planned Parenthood Affiliates of California
- TransLatina Coalition

== Opposition ==
In the state voter guide, opponents of the proposition argued that it "removes ALL protections on marriage, including limits on children, close relatives, and three or more people marrying each other" as well as "[overriding] all laws on marriage [and a] 'fundamental right' to marry [meaning] it would remove protections against child marriages, incest, and polygamy" and that "changing the definition of marriage, this measure also suggests that children don’t need both a mom and a dad [as Prop 3] goes against years of research showing that kids do best when raised by their mother and father in a stable, married home [and that] children without a mother or father are more likely to have emotional issues, take part in risky behaviors, struggle in school, and face financial problems."

Opponents

Organizations

- The American Council for Evangelicals
- California Capitol Connection
- California Family Council
- Concerned Women for America Legislative Action Committee
- Freedom in Action
- Real Impact

== Polling ==
Poll source	Date(s) administered	Sample size (Note: Key: A – all adults RV – registered voters LV – likely voters V – unclear)	Margin of error	Support	Oppose	Undecided
Public Policy Institute of California	October 7–15, 2024	1,137 (LV)	± 3.7%	67%	32%	1%
USC/CSU Long Beach/Cal Poly Pomona	September 12–25, 2024	1,685 (LV)	± 2.4%	66%	24%	10%
Public Policy Institute of California	August 29 – September 11, 2024	1,071 (LV)	± 3.7%	68%	31%	1%
USC/CSU Long Beach/ Cal Poly Pomona	January 21–29, 2024	1,416 (LV)	± 2.6%	73%	20%	7%

== Results ==
On November 5, 2024, at 8:00 PM PT, polls in California closed. With 62.6% in favor, Proposition 3 was approved.

Proposition 3
Choice	Votes	%
For	9,477,435	62.62
Against	5,658,187	37.38
Total	15,135,622	100.00
Registered voters/turnout	22,595,659	66.98

=== Results by county ===
	YES		NO		Total votes
County	#	%	#	%	#
Alameda	484,349	74.9%	162,389	25.1%	646,738
Alpine	521	72.0%	203	28.0%	724
Amador	9,728	45.4%	11,687	54.6%	21,415
Butte	51,240	56.3%	39,753	43.7%	90,993
Calaveras	11,429	44.9%	14,014	55.1%	25,443
Colusa	2,841	42.9%	3,786	57.1%	6,627
Contra Costa	354,545	69.8%	153,595	30.2%	508,140
Del Norte	4,819	47.0%	5,432	53.0%	10,251
El Dorado	56,464	52.7%	50,746	47.3%	107,210
Fresno	155,136	49.3%	159,795	50.7%	314,931
Glenn	4,149	41.6%	5,835	58.4%	9,984
Humboldt	44,423	71.3%	17,921	28.7%	62,344
Imperial	25,454	48.7%	26,829	51.3%	52,283
Inyo	4,658	54.2%	3,940	45.8%	8,598
Kern	119,523	43.4%	155,599	56.6%	275,122
Kings	18,283	45.0%	22,335	55.0%	40,618
Lake	14,540	57.0%	10,949	43.0%	25,489
Lassen	3,766	34.3%	7,224	65.7%	10,990
Los Angeles	2,277,244	65.7%	1,188,271	34.3%	3,465,515
Madera	22,497	42.7%	30,145	57.3%	52,642
Marin	119,254	86.0%	19,470	14.0%	138,724
Mariposa	4,153	45.6%	4,963	54.4%	9,116
Mendocino	25,895	68.6%	11,856	31.4%	37,751
Merced	40,741	49.8%	40,996	50.2%	81,737
Modoc	1,387	35.6%	2,506	64.4%	3,893
Mono	3,926	67.2%	1,918	32.8%	5,844
Monterey	93,834	66.2%	48,009	33.8%	141,843
Napa	43,574	69.7%	18,975	30.3%	62,549
Nevada	37,848	63.1%	22,179	36.9%	60,027
Orange	767,402	57.5%	566,501	42.5%	1,333,903
Placer	121,006	53.4%	105,599	46.6%	226,605
Plumas	4,870	49.5%	4,968	50.5%	9,838
Riverside	488,115	53.8%	418,428	46.2%	906,543
Sacramento	393,738	62.7%	234,223	37.3%	627,961
San Benito	15,863	59.1%	10,987	40.9%	26,850
San Bernardino	368,109	50.1%	365,924	49.9%	734,033
San Diego	929,477	65.6%	488,011	34.4%	1,417,488
San Francisco	327,877	84.7%	59,058	15.3%	386,935
San Joaquin	130,128	51.8%	120,858	48.2%	250,986
San Luis Obispo	87,056	59.7%	58,764	40.3%	145,820
San Mateo	236,724	75.3%	77,562	24.7%	314,286
Santa Barbara	117,376	66.1%	60,284	33.9%	177,660
Santa Clara	505,248	69.8%	218,403	30.2%	723,651
Santa Cruz	103,970	79.9%	26,174	20.1%	130,144
Shasta	34,720	40.9%	50,161	59.1%	84,881
Sierra	763	45.0%	932	55.0%	1,695
Siskiyou	9,955	48.1%	10,762	51.9%	20,717
Solano	111,727	61.2%	70,800	38.8%	182,527
Sonoma	184,233	76.0%	58,225	24.0%	242,458
Stanislaus	93,352	49.4%	95,431	50.6%	188,783
Sutter	16,028	42.8%	21,457	57.2%	37,485
Tehama	9,735	38.0%	15,865	62.0%	25,600
Trinity	2,873	52.6%	2,594	47.4%	5,467
Tulare	58,504	43.8%	75,000	56.2%	133,504
Tuolumne	12,935	46.3%	15,010	53.7%	27,945
Ventura	232,949	62.0%	142,671	38.0%	375,620
Yolo	63,657	70.4%	26,736	29.6%	90,393
Yuba	12,824	45.3%	15,479	54.7%	28,303
Totals	9,477,435	62.6%	5,658,187	37.4%	15,135,622

=== Results by city ===
By municipality

Official outcome by city and unincorporated areas of counties, of which Yes won 413 and No won 127.
City	County	Yes		No		Margin		Total Votes	Swing from 2024 Presidential (Harris to "Yes")%
City	County	#	%	#	%	#	%	Total Votes	Swing from 2024 Presidential (Harris to "Yes")%
Alameda	Alameda	31,123	81.30%	7,158	18.70%	23,965	62.60%	38,281	-1.07%
Albany	Alameda	8,410	89.13%	1,026	10.87%	7,384	78.25%	9,436	-0.11%
Berkeley	Alameda	53,057	92.85%	4,087	7.15%	48,970	85.70%	57,144	1.05%
Dublin	Alameda	17,415	66.30%	8,852	33.70%	8,563	32.60%	26,267	-3.19%
Emeryville	Alameda	4,522	87.43%	650	12.57%	3,872	74.86%	5,172	-1.21%
Fremont	Alameda	50,552	62.96%	29,741	37.04%	20,811	25.92%	80,293	-8.13%
Hayward	Alameda	32,030	67.03%	15,754	32.97%	16,276	34.06%	47,784	-8.12%
Livermore	Alameda	28,352	67.00%	13,965	33.00%	14,387	34.00%	42,317	9.26%
Newark	Alameda	10,759	65.53%	5,660	34.47%	5,099	31.06%	16,419	-4.04%
Oakland	Alameda	141,356	84.83%	25,272	15.17%	116,084	69.67%	166,628	-6.54%
Piedmont	Alameda	6,413	88.72%	815	11.28%	5,598	77.45%	7,228	2.66%
Pleasanton	Alameda	24,383	67.92%	11,517	32.08%	12,866	35.84%	35,900	1.15%
San Leandro	Alameda	21,890	69.01%	9,828	30.99%	12,062	38.03%	31,718	-7.48%
Union City	Alameda	16,521	64.59%	9,059	35.41%	7,462	29.17%	25,580	-7.76%
Unincorporated Area	Alameda	37,566	66.41%	19,005	33.59%	18,561	32.81%	56,571	-4.50%
Unincorporated Area	Alpine	521	71.96%	203	28.04%	318	43.92%	724	11.94%
Amador	Amador	101	76.52%	31	23.48%	70	53.03%	132	21.15%
Ione	Amador	1,202	40.43%	1,771	59.57%	-569	-19.14%	2,973	21.44%
Jackson	Amador	1,293	51.97%	1,195	48.03%	98	3.94%	2,488	18.65%
Plymouth	Amador	295	47.58%	325	52.42%	-30	-4.84%	620	22.28%
Sutter Creek	Amador	807	52.99%	716	47.01%	91	5.98%	1,523	14.50%
Unincorporated Area	Amador	6,030	44.08%	7,649	55.92%	-1,619	-11.84%	13,679	18.36%
Biggs	Butte	281	40.32%	416	59.68%	-135	-19.37%	697	18.55%
Chico	Butte	29,901	68.78%	13,571	31.22%	16,330	37.56%	43,472	14.03%
Gridley	Butte	1,084	46.07%	1,269	53.93%	-185	-7.86%	2,353	7.58%
Oroville	Butte	2,707	46.10%	3,165	53.90%	-458	-7.80%	5,872	15.54%
Paradise	Butte	2,534	45.45%	3,041	54.55%	-507	-9.09%	5,575	16.97%
Unincorporated Area	Butte	14,733	44.61%	18,291	55.39%	-3,558	-10.77%	33,024	18.08%
Angels	Calaveras	984	49.60%	1,000	50.40%	-16	-0.81%	1,984	20.68%
Unincorporated Area	Calaveras	10,445	44.52%	13,014	55.48%	-2,569	-10.95%	23,459	17.72%
Colusa	Colusa	980	46.58%	1,124	53.42%	-144	-6.84%	2,104	20.23%
Williams	Colusa	547	49.06%	568	50.94%	-21	-1.88%	1,115	-4.11%
Unincorporated Area	Colusa	1,314	38.56%	2,094	61.44%	-780	-22.89%	3,408	15.92%
Antioch	Contra Costa	25,170	61.09%	16,034	38.91%	9,136	22.17%	41,204	-9.85%
Brentwood	Contra Costa	18,610	59.82%	12,502	40.18%	6,108	19.63%	31,112	7.19%
Clayton	Contra Costa	4,467	64.75%	2,432	35.25%	2,035	29.50%	6,899	11.27%
Concord	Contra Costa	35,632	69.26%	15,818	30.74%	19,814	38.51%	51,450	3.29%
Danville	Contra Costa	17,959	70.12%	7,653	29.88%	10,306	40.24%	25,612	13.51%
El Cerrito	Contra Costa	12,180	87.79%	1,694	12.21%	10,486	75.58%	13,874	0.07%
Hercules	Contra Costa	8,028	67.96%	3,785	32.04%	4,243	35.92%	11,813	-13.75%
Lafayette	Contra Costa	12,532	81.51%	2,842	18.49%	9,690	63.03%	15,374	7.91%
Martinez	Contra Costa	14,655	72.94%	5,437	27.06%	9,218	45.88%	20,092	9.24%
Moraga	Contra Costa	7,274	79.06%	1,927	20.94%	5,347	58.11%	9,201	4.80%
Oakley	Contra Costa	10,509	57.10%	7,897	42.90%	2,612	14.19%	18,406	7.20%
Orinda	Contra Costa	10,036	82.73%	2,095	17.27%	7,941	65.46%	12,131	7.70%
Pinole	Contra Costa	5,965	69.64%	2,600	30.36%	3,365	39.29%	8,565	-5.26%
Pittsburg	Contra Costa	15,498	63.31%	8,981	36.69%	6,517	26.62%	24,479	-12.25%
Pleasant Hill	Contra Costa	13,750	75.85%	4,378	24.15%	9,372	51.70%	18,128	6.46%
Richmond	Contra Costa	27,700	75.21%	9,132	24.79%	18,568	50.41%	36,832	-13.14%
San Pablo	Contra Costa	4,939	67.99%	2,325	32.01%	2,614	35.99%	7,264	-15.16%
San Ramon	Contra Costa	24,740	66.15%	12,658	33.85%	12,082	32.31%	37,398	-1.40%
Walnut Creek	Contra Costa	30,138	77.58%	8,710	22.42%	21,428	55.16%	38,848	5.03%
Unincorporated Area	Contra Costa	54,763	68.92%	24,695	31.08%	30,068	37.84%	79,458	8.13%
Crescent City	Del Norte	682	56.13%	533	43.87%	149	12.26%	1,215	13.53%
Unincorporated Area	Del Norte	4,137	45.78%	4,899	54.22%	-762	-8.43%	9,036	10.03%
Placerville	El Dorado	2,816	58.44%	2,003	41.56%	813	16.87%	4,819	14.97%
South Lake Tahoe	El Dorado	6,062	70.78%	2,502	29.22%	3,560	41.57%	8,564	14.56%
Unincorporated Area	El Dorado	47,586	50.72%	46,241	49.28%	1,345	1.43%	93,827	17.73%
Clovis	Fresno	24,153	45.12%	29,374	54.88%	-5,221	-9.75%	53,527	10.66%
Coalinga	Fresno	1,603	44.10%	2,032	55.90%	-429	-11.80%	3,635	5.84%
Firebaugh	Fresno	883	52.25%	807	47.75%	76	4.50%	1,690	-7.87%
Fowler	Fresno	1,336	46.41%	1,543	53.59%	-207	-7.19%	2,879	3.10%
Fresno	Fresno	84,925	54.27%	71,566	45.73%	13,359	8.54%	156,491	0.32%
Huron	Fresno	399	60.18%	264	39.82%	135	20.36%	663	-15.07%
Kerman	Fresno	2,079	47.78%	2,272	52.22%	-193	-4.44%	4,351	1.38%
Kingsburg	Fresno	1,874	33.37%	3,741	66.63%	-1,867	-33.25%	5,615	4.38%
Mendota	Fresno	735	50.07%	733	49.93%	2	0.14%	1,468	-13.09%
Orange Cove	Fresno	875	53.39%	764	46.61%	111	6.77%	1,639	-8.63%
Parlier	Fresno	1,405	57.39%	1,043	42.61%	362	14.79%	2,448	-12.23%
Reedley	Fresno	3,025	45.35%	3,646	54.65%	-621	-9.31%	6,671	-3.38%
San Joaquin	Fresno	320	59.04%	222	40.96%	98	18.08%	542	-27.59%
Sanger	Fresno	3,690	49.19%	3,811	50.81%	-121	-1.61%	7,501	-8.33%
Selma	Fresno	3,002	47.71%	3,290	52.29%	-288	-4.58%	6,292	-5.13%
Unincorporated Area	Fresno	24,832	41.72%	34,687	58.28%	-9,855	-16.56%	59,519	7.73%
Orland	Glenn	1,233	48.70%	1,299	51.30%	-66	-2.61%	2,532	13.47%
Willows	Glenn	944	46.30%	1,095	53.70%	-151	-7.41%	2,039	22.11%
Unincorporated Area	Glenn	1,972	36.43%	3,441	63.57%	-1,469	-27.14%	5,413	18.64%
Arcata	Humboldt	7,471	88.25%	995	11.75%	6,476	76.49%	8,466	9.11%
Blue Lake	Humboldt	532	80.97%	125	19.03%	407	61.95%	657	13.71%
Eureka	Humboldt	8,637	75.58%	2,790	24.42%	5,847	51.17%	11,427	11.94%
Ferndale	Humboldt	537	62.59%	321	37.41%	216	25.17%	858	17.22%
Fortuna	Humboldt	2,858	55.08%	2,331	44.92%	527	10.16%	5,189	17.51%
Rio Dell	Humboldt	698	54.11%	592	45.89%	106	8.22%	1,290	32.15%
Trinidad	Humboldt	178	82.03%	39	17.97%	139	64.06%	217	11.65%
Unincorporated Area	Humboldt	23,512	68.67%	10,728	31.33%	12,784	37.34%	34,240	14.69%
Brawley	Imperial	3,677	47.52%	4,061	52.48%	-384	-4.96%	7,738	-0.36%
Calexico	Imperial	6,261	53.49%	5,443	46.51%	818	6.99%	11,704	-10.35%
Calipatria	Imperial	429	49.60%	436	50.40%	-7	-0.81%	865	1.64%
El Centro	Imperial	6,679	49.27%	6,877	50.73%	-198	-1.46%	13,556	-4.44%
Holtville	Imperial	875	49.05%	909	50.95%	-34	-1.91%	1,784	2.73%
Imperial	Imperial	3,614	46.73%	4,119	53.27%	-505	-6.53%	7,733	10.47%
Westmorland	Imperial	237	49.17%	245	50.83%	-8	-1.66%	482	-16.61%
Unincorporated Area	Imperial	3,682	43.72%	4,739	56.28%	-1,057	-12.55%	8,421	1.45%
Bishop	Inyo	990	64.62%	542	35.38%	448	29.24%	1,532	14.44%
Unincorporated Area	Inyo	3,668	51.91%	3,398	48.09%	270	3.82%	7,066	10.80%
Arvin	Kern	1,717	57.18%	1,286	42.82%	431	14.35%	3,003	-5.24%
Bakersfield	Kern	59,987	44.80%	73,914	55.20%	-13,927	-10.40%	133,901	5.03%
California City	Kern	1,866	47.92%	2,028	52.08%	-162	-4.16%	3,894	2.73%
Delano	Kern	4,800	53.90%	4,105	46.10%	695	7.80%	8,905	-0.88%
Maricopa	Kern	93	29.62%	221	70.38%	-128	-40.76%	314	27.20%
McFarland	Kern	1,214	53.48%	1,056	46.52%	158	6.96%	2,270	-1.88%
Ridgecrest	Kern	5,366	47.05%	6,040	52.95%	-674	-5.91%	11,406	18.79%
Shafter	Kern	2,570	43.37%	3,356	56.63%	-786	-13.26%	5,926	10.41%
Taft	Kern	700	31.88%	1,496	68.12%	-796	-36.25%	2,196	27.10%
Tehachapi	Kern	1,572	40.99%	2,263	59.01%	-691	-18.02%	3,835	13.94%
Wasco	Kern	2,018	45.81%	2,387	54.19%	-369	-8.38%	4,405	-2.96%
Unincorporated Area	Kern	37,620	39.57%	57,447	60.43%	-19,827	-20.86%	95,067	12.06%
Avenal	Kings	702	52.86%	626	47.14%	76	5.72%	1,328	6.77%
Corcoran	Kings	1,371	50.07%	1,367	49.93%	4	0.15%	2,738	2.40%
Hanford	Kings	9,425	46.22%	10,968	53.78%	-1,543	-7.57%	20,393	13.50%
Lemoore	Kings	3,875	45.96%	4,557	54.04%	-682	-8.09%	8,432	14.90%
Unincorporated Area	Kings	2,910	37.66%	4,817	62.34%	-1,907	-24.68%	7,727	14.62%
Clearlake	Lake	2,267	56.45%	1,749	43.55%	518	12.90%	4,016	11.34%
Lakeport	Lake	1,296	58.80%	908	41.20%	388	17.60%	2,204	12.70%
Unincorporated Area	Lake	10,977	56.97%	8,292	43.03%	2,685	13.93%	19,269	16.65%
Susanville	Lassen	1,441	39.71%	2,188	60.29%	-747	-20.58%	3,629	25.02%
Unincorporated Area	Lassen	2,325	31.59%	5,036	68.41%	-2,711	-36.83%	7,361	21.37%
Agoura Hills	Los Angeles	8,035	70.38%	3,381	29.62%	4,654	40.77%	11,416	18.01%
Alhambra	Los Angeles	17,828	64.57%	9,784	35.43%	8,044	29.13%	27,612	-2.41%
Arcadia	Los Angeles	11,308	54.83%	9,315	45.17%	1,993	9.66%	20,623	-1.17%
Artesia	Los Angeles	2,806	53.62%	2,427	46.38%	379	7.24%	5,233	-3.44%
Avalon	Los Angeles	653	63.15%	381	36.85%	272	26.31%	1,034	12.59%
Azusa	Los Angeles	8,438	57.97%	6,118	42.03%	2,320	15.94%	14,556	-5.30%
Baldwin Park	Los Angeles	10,619	59.16%	7,330	40.84%	3,289	18.32%	17,949	-10.28%
Bell	Los Angeles	4,329	60.74%	2,798	39.26%	1,531	21.48%	7,127	-10.41%
Bell Gardens	Los Angeles	4,815	62.44%	2,897	37.56%	1,918	24.87%	7,712	-9.45%
Bellflower	Los Angeles	12,594	53.80%	10,816	46.20%	1,778	7.60%	23,410	-14.04%
Beverly Hills	Los Angeles	10,558	67.34%	5,120	32.66%	5,438	34.69%	15,678	39.53%
Bradbury	Los Angeles	221	52.37%	201	47.63%	20	4.74%	422	8.33%
Burbank	Los Angeles	33,918	70.09%	14,475	29.91%	19,443	40.18%	48,393	6.32%
Calabasas	Los Angeles	8,601	71.86%	3,368	28.14%	5,233	43.72%	11,969	25.68%
Carson	Los Angeles	20,480	57.19%	15,329	42.81%	5,151	14.38%	35,809	-27.58%
Cerritos	Los Angeles	12,374	53.34%	10,823	46.66%	1,551	6.69%	23,197	-11.72%
Claremont	Los Angeles	12,245	68.89%	5,529	31.11%	6,716	37.79%	17,774	1.70%
Commerce	Los Angeles	2,394	60.92%	1,536	39.08%	858	21.83%	3,930	-13.47%
Compton	Los Angeles	13,713	59.77%	9,229	40.23%	4,484	19.54%	22,942	-36.12%
Covina	Los Angeles	10,876	55.24%	8,813	44.76%	2,063	10.48%	19,689	-2.24%
Cudahy	Los Angeles	2,654	63.52%	1,524	36.48%	1,130	27.05%	4,178	-9.09%
Culver City	Los Angeles	17,614	82.06%	3,850	17.94%	13,764	64.13%	21,464	-0.51%
Diamond Bar	Los Angeles	10,719	49.81%	10,799	50.19%	-80	-0.37%	21,518	-7.70%
Downey	Los Angeles	21,872	55.11%	17,814	44.89%	4,058	10.23%	39,686	-6.05%
Duarte	Los Angeles	5,322	59.39%	3,639	40.61%	1,683	18.78%	8,961	-6.85%
El Monte	Los Angeles	13,104	60.07%	8,712	39.93%	4,392	20.13%	21,816	-3.56%
El Segundo	Los Angeles	6,707	71.83%	2,630	28.17%	4,077	43.66%	9,337	13.27%
Gardena	Los Angeles	12,249	60.44%	8,018	39.56%	4,231	20.88%	20,267	-22.00%
Glendale	Los Angeles	39,368	58.37%	28,075	41.63%	11,293	16.74%	67,443	4.33%
Glendora	Los Angeles	12,565	50.11%	12,509	49.89%	56	0.22%	25,074	5.68%
Hawaiian Gardens	Los Angeles	1,906	56.86%	1,446	43.14%	460	13.72%	3,352	-12.81%
Hawthorne	Los Angeles	15,675	63.57%	8,984	36.43%	6,691	27.13%	24,659	-18.32%
Hermosa Beach	Los Angeles	8,452	78.53%	2,311	21.47%	6,141	57.06%	10,763	19.80%
Hidden Hills	Los Angeles	703	70.44%	295	29.56%	408	40.88%	998	31.19%
Huntington Park	Los Angeles	6,753	63.24%	3,926	36.76%	2,827	26.47%	10,679	-12.60%
Industry	Los Angeles	32	47.76%	35	52.24%	-3	-4.48%	67	2.67%
Inglewood	Los Angeles	23,922	66.56%	12,019	33.44%	11,903	33.12%	35,941	-34.69%
Irwindale	Los Angeles	358	53.12%	316	46.88%	42	6.23%	674	-17.71%
La Canada Flintridge	Los Angeles	7,385	63.93%	4,167	36.07%	3,218	27.86%	11,552	5.80%
La Habra Heights	Los Angeles	1,329	46.00%	1,560	54.00%	-231	-8.00%	2,889	7.86%
La Mirada	Los Angeles	10,206	48.64%	10,776	51.36%	-570	-2.72%	20,982	-3.92%
La Puente	Los Angeles	5,988	58.79%	4,197	41.21%	1,791	17.58%	10,185	-10.70%
La Verne	Los Angeles	8,584	52.21%	7,858	47.79%	726	4.42%	16,442	6.69%
Lakewood	Los Angeles	21,566	57.73%	15,788	42.27%	5,778	15.47%	37,354	-0.55%
Lancaster	Los Angeles	26,769	51.08%	25,641	48.92%	1,128	2.15%	52,410	-6.35%
Lawndale	Los Angeles	5,572	62.60%	3,329	37.40%	2,243	25.20%	8,901	-5.29%
Lomita	Los Angeles	4,667	58.05%	3,372	41.95%	1,295	16.11%	8,039	4.84%
Long Beach	Los Angeles	116,101	70.04%	49,653	29.96%	66,448	40.09%	165,754	-0.10%
Los Angeles	Los Angeles	924,407	72.10%	357,790	27.90%	566,617	44.19%	1,282,197	0.61%
Lynwood	Los Angeles	8,751	59.59%	5,935	40.41%	2,816	19.17%	14,686	-22.06%
Malibu	Los Angeles	4,192	74.62%	1,426	25.38%	2,766	49.23%	5,618	21.48%
Manhattan Beach	Los Angeles	15,295	75.76%	4,893	24.24%	10,402	51.53%	20,188	20.25%
Maywood	Los Angeles	3,171	62.40%	1,911	37.60%	1,260	24.79%	5,082	-14.01%
Monrovia	Los Angeles	10,875	64.81%	5,906	35.19%	4,969	29.61%	16,781	0.21%
Montebello	Los Angeles	11,910	61.25%	7,536	38.75%	4,374	22.49%	19,446	-10.03%
Monterey Park	Los Angeles	10,839	60.63%	7,039	39.37%	3,800	21.26%	17,878	-3.05%
Norwalk	Los Angeles	18,840	56.87%	14,291	43.13%	4,549	13.73%	33,131	-9.97%
Palmdale	Los Angeles	26,474	52.70%	23,762	47.30%	2,712	5.40%	50,236	-8.60%
Palos Verdes Estates	Los Angeles	5,250	64.46%	2,894	35.54%	2,356	28.93%	8,144	17.68%
Paramount	Los Angeles	7,469	59.53%	5,077	40.47%	2,392	19.07%	12,546	-17.36%
Pasadena	Los Angeles	47,427	75.82%	15,127	24.18%	32,300	51.64%	62,554	-1.15%
Pico Rivera	Los Angeles	12,931	59.84%	8,678	40.16%	4,253	19.68%	21,609	-13.09%
Pomona	Los Angeles	23,399	58.19%	16,811	41.81%	6,588	16.38%	40,210	-8.46%
Rancho Palos Verdes	Los Angeles	13,262	59.82%	8,907	40.18%	4,355	19.64%	22,169	5.84%
Redondo Beach	Los Angeles	26,196	73.15%	9,616	26.85%	16,580	46.30%	35,812	12.25%
Rolling Hills	Los Angeles	614	54.87%	505	45.13%	109	9.74%	1,119	24.60%
Rolling Hills Estates	Los Angeles	2,857	60.40%	1,873	39.60%	984	20.80%	4,730	12.82%
Rosemead	Los Angeles	6,988	60.39%	4,583	39.61%	2,405	20.78%	11,571	2.55%
San Dimas	Los Angeles	8,231	50.27%	8,143	49.73%	88	0.54%	16,374	4.15%
San Fernando	Los Angeles	4,121	61.80%	2,547	38.20%	1,574	23.61%	6,668	-10.36%
San Gabriel	Los Angeles	6,911	60.29%	4,552	39.71%	2,359	20.58%	11,463	-0.87%
San Marino	Los Angeles	3,785	60.20%	2,502	39.80%	1,283	20.41%	6,287	5.11%
Santa Clarita	Los Angeles	60,120	55.43%	48,348	44.57%	11,772	10.85%	108,468	8.10%
Santa Fe Springs	Los Angeles	3,816	55.59%	3,048	44.41%	768	11.19%	6,864	-11.47%
Santa Monica	Los Angeles	40,750	84.51%	7,470	15.49%	33,280	69.02%	48,220	8.75%
Sierra Madre	Los Angeles	4,783	70.91%	1,962	29.09%	2,821	41.82%	6,745	5.34%
Signal Hill	Los Angeles	3,279	68.89%	1,481	31.11%	1,798	37.77%	4,760	-3.88%
South El Monte	Los Angeles	2,693	59.16%	1,859	40.84%	834	18.32%	4,552	-7.21%
South Gate	Los Angeles	14,092	60.71%	9,120	39.29%	4,972	21.42%	23,212	-13.98%
South Pasadena	Los Angeles	10,737	78.96%	2,861	21.04%	7,876	57.92%	13,598	-0.17%
Temple City	Los Angeles	6,534	52.59%	5,890	47.41%	644	5.18%	12,424	-3.13%
Torrance	Los Angeles	40,064	61.58%	24,993	38.42%	15,071	23.17%	65,057	5.24%
Vernon	Los Angeles	40	57.14%	30	42.86%	10	14.29%	70	-16.48%
Walnut	Los Angeles	6,212	51.09%	5,947	48.91%	265	2.18%	12,159	-9.64%
West Covina	Los Angeles	21,911	56.68%	16,749	43.32%	5,162	13.35%	38,660	-4.28%
West Hollywood	Los Angeles	17,378	89.70%	1,996	10.30%	15,382	79.40%	19,374	15.12%
Westlake Village	Los Angeles	3,202	66.01%	1,649	33.99%	1,553	32.01%	4,851	17.54%
Whittier	Los Angeles	21,331	58.27%	15,278	41.73%	6,053	16.53%	36,609	-0.37%
Unincorporated Area	Los Angeles	201,160	59.95%	134,373	40.05%	66,787	19.90%	335,533	-6.20%
Chowchilla	Madera	1,747	41.20%	2,493	58.80%	-746	-17.59%	4,240	11.04%
Madera	Madera	7,268	47.67%	7,979	52.33%	-711	-4.66%	15,247	-3.04%
Unincorporated Area	Madera	13,482	40.66%	19,673	59.34%	-6,191	-18.67%	33,155	10.06%
Belvedere	Marin	1,077	84.87%	192	15.13%	885	69.74%	1,269	19.86%
Corte Madera	Marin	5,042	87.41%	726	12.59%	4,316	74.83%	5,768	6.33%
Fairfax	Marin	4,481	91.52%	415	8.48%	4,066	83.05%	4,896	5.66%
Larkspur	Marin	6,495	87.17%	956	12.83%	5,539	74.34%	7,451	7.41%
Mill Valley	Marin	8,044	91.48%	749	8.52%	7,295	82.96%	8,793	4.16%
Novato	Marin	21,562	79.45%	5,576	20.55%	15,986	58.91%	27,138	9.24%
Ross	Marin	1,191	86.68%	183	13.32%	1,008	73.36%	1,374	14.45%
San Anselmo	Marin	7,168	90.87%	720	9.13%	6,448	81.74%	7,888	5.74%
San Rafael	Marin	22,288	85.55%	3,764	14.45%	18,524	71.10%	26,052	6.57%
Sausalito	Marin	4,073	89.28%	489	10.72%	3,584	78.56%	4,562	9.60%
Tiburon	Marin	4,536	84.49%	833	15.51%	3,703	68.97%	5,369	11.17%
Unincorporated Area	Marin	33,297	87.25%	4,867	12.75%	28,430	74.49%	38,164	8.99%
Unincorporated Area	Mariposa	4,153	45.56%	4,963	54.44%	-810	-8.89%	9,116	12.18%
Fort Bragg	Mendocino	2,116	75.52%	686	24.48%	1,430	51.03%	2,802	8.49%
Point Arena	Mendocino	167	85.64%	28	14.36%	139	71.28%	195	11.88%
Ukiah	Mendocino	3,914	66.28%	1,991	33.72%	1,923	32.57%	5,905	7.61%
Willits	Mendocino	1,256	66.84%	623	33.16%	633	33.69%	1,879	13.09%
Unincorporated Area	Mendocino	18,442	68.38%	8,528	31.62%	9,914	36.76%	26,970	10.95%
Atwater	Merced	4,611	49.30%	4,742	50.70%	-131	-1.40%	9,353	7.72%
Dos Palos	Merced	688	43.60%	890	56.40%	-202	-12.80%	1,578	-5.26%
Gustine	Merced	888	48.76%	933	51.24%	-45	-2.47%	1,821	9.07%
Livingston	Merced	2,071	53.86%	1,774	46.14%	297	7.72%	3,845	1.07%
Los Banos	Merced	7,123	55.51%	5,708	44.49%	1,415	11.03%	12,831	4.22%
Merced	Merced	14,258	55.65%	11,362	44.35%	2,896	11.30%	25,620	1.02%
Unincorporated Area	Merced	11,102	41.60%	15,587	58.40%	-4,485	-16.80%	26,689	6.29%
Alturas	Modoc	420	39.62%	640	60.38%	-220	-20.75%	1,060	22.06%
Unincorporated Area	Modoc	967	34.13%	1,866	65.87%	-899	-31.73%	2,833	16.47%
Mammoth Lakes	Mono	2,188	74.85%	735	25.15%	1,453	49.71%	2,923	13.94%
Unincorporated Area	Mono	1,738	59.50%	1,183	40.50%	555	19.00%	2,921	14.34%
Carmel-by-the-Sea	Monterey	1,649	76.17%	516	23.83%	1,133	52.33%	2,165	12.74%
Del Rey Oaks	Monterey	705	73.21%	258	26.79%	447	46.42%	963	12.25%
Gonzales	Monterey	1,319	63.08%	772	36.92%	547	26.16%	2,091	0.25%
Greenfield	Monterey	1,996	61.83%	1,232	38.17%	764	23.67%	3,228	-7.52%
King City	Monterey	1,272	56.43%	982	43.57%	290	12.87%	2,254	4.42%
Marina	Monterey	6,275	68.69%	2,860	31.31%	3,415	37.38%	9,135	0.79%
Monterey	Monterey	9,432	75.90%	2,995	24.10%	6,437	51.80%	12,427	6.37%
Pacific Grove	Monterey	6,796	80.56%	1,640	19.44%	5,156	61.12%	8,436	5.53%
Salinas	Monterey	24,778	62.15%	15,093	37.85%	9,685	24.29%	39,871	-2.99%
Sand City	Monterey	117	70.48%	49	29.52%	68	40.96%	166	8.59%
Seaside	Monterey	6,910	69.62%	3,016	30.38%	3,894	39.23%	9,926	-1.56%
Soledad	Monterey	2,736	59.82%	1,838	40.18%	898	19.63%	4,574	-5.63%
Unincorporated Area	Monterey	29,849	64.04%	16,758	35.96%	13,091	28.09%	46,607	7.55%
American Canyon	Napa	5,745	62.57%	3,436	37.43%	2,309	25.15%	9,181	-7.86%
Calistoga	Napa	1,525	77.22%	450	22.78%	1,075	54.43%	1,975	5.25%
Napa	Napa	25,579	71.70%	10,096	28.30%	15,483	43.40%	35,675	5.54%
St. Helena	Napa	2,152	77.97%	608	22.03%	1,544	55.94%	2,760	7.44%
Yountville	Napa	939	71.35%	377	28.65%	562	42.71%	1,316	-1.01%
Unincorporated Area	Napa	7,634	65.57%	4,008	34.43%	3,626	31.15%	11,642	10.72%
Grass Valley	Nevada	4,258	65.22%	2,271	34.78%	1,987	30.43%	6,529	12.45%
Nevada City	Nevada	1,639	81.26%	378	18.74%	1,261	62.52%	2,017	12.30%
Truckee	Nevada	7,466	80.76%	1,779	19.24%	5,687	61.51%	9,245	10.02%
Unincorporated Area	Nevada	24,485	57.97%	17,751	42.03%	6,734	15.94%	42,236	14.92%
Aliso Viejo	Orange	15,199	62.27%	9,211	37.73%	5,988	24.53%	24,410	15.92%
Anaheim	Orange	63,236	56.92%	47,862	43.08%	15,374	13.84%	111,098	4.77%
Brea	Orange	11,952	53.03%	10,585	46.97%	1,367	6.07%	22,537	7.36%
Buena Park	Orange	15,403	52.17%	14,119	47.83%	1,284	4.35%	29,522	-0.66%
Costa Mesa	Orange	29,447	63.30%	17,075	36.70%	12,372	26.59%	46,522	21.37%
Cypress	Orange	12,312	52.95%	10,940	47.05%	1,372	5.90%	23,252	2.88%
Dana Point	Orange	11,420	60.10%	7,581	39.90%	3,839	20.20%	19,001	26.79%
Fountain Valley	Orange	15,200	54.22%	12,836	45.78%	2,364	8.43%	28,036	13.53%
Fullerton	Orange	31,745	56.59%	24,353	43.41%	7,392	13.18%	56,098	2.70%
Garden Grove	Orange	32,712	55.29%	26,456	44.71%	6,256	10.57%	59,168	13.19%
Huntington Beach	Orange	57,857	55.86%	45,718	44.14%	12,139	11.72%	103,575	20.54%
Irvine	Orange	72,597	63.04%	42,570	36.96%	30,027	26.07%	115,167	4.63%
La Habra	Orange	12,204	52.61%	10,993	47.39%	1,211	5.22%	23,197	0.99%
La Palma	Orange	3,614	51.40%	3,417	48.60%	197	2.80%	7,031	-4.97%
Laguna Beach	Orange	10,588	74.29%	3,665	25.71%	6,923	48.57%	14,253	23.23%
Laguna Hills	Orange	8,780	57.73%	6,428	42.27%	2,352	15.47%	15,208	15.45%
Laguna Niguel	Orange	21,297	60.31%	14,017	39.69%	7,280	20.62%	35,314	20.60%
Laguna Woods	Orange	7,282	58.42%	5,183	41.58%	2,099	16.84%	12,465	0.88%
Lake Forest	Orange	24,076	58.00%	17,436	42.00%	6,640	16.00%	41,512	12.36%
Los Alamitos	Orange	3,247	57.18%	2,432	42.82%	815	14.35%	5,679	13.60%
Mission Viejo	Orange	29,125	56.64%	22,295	43.36%	6,830	13.28%	51,420	14.29%
Newport Beach	Orange	27,695	58.30%	19,808	41.70%	7,887	16.60%	47,503	33.49%
Orange	Orange	33,467	57.25%	24,986	42.75%	8,481	14.51%	58,453	11.51%
Placentia	Orange	13,416	54.85%	11,045	45.15%	2,371	9.69%	24,461	9.40%
Rancho Santa Margarita	Orange	13,873	56.24%	10,794	43.76%	3,079	12.48%	24,667	16.71%
San Clemente	Orange	20,556	56.12%	16,071	43.88%	4,485	12.25%	36,627	25.95%
San Juan Capistrano	Orange	10,029	56.11%	7,844	43.89%	2,185	12.23%	17,873	20.16%
Santa Ana	Orange	47,840	61.51%	29,940	38.49%	17,900	23.01%	77,780	-0.73%
Seal Beach	Orange	9,232	58.69%	6,498	41.31%	2,734	17.38%	15,730	12.06%
Stanton	Orange	6,208	56.41%	4,798	43.59%	1,410	12.81%	11,006	7.21%
Tustin	Orange	18,518	60.93%	11,874	39.07%	6,644	21.86%	30,392	6.29%
Villa Park	Orange	1,788	47.45%	1,980	52.55%	-192	-5.10%	3,768	21.13%
Westminster	Orange	18,887	54.55%	15,737	45.45%	3,150	9.10%	34,624	18.07%
Yorba Linda	Orange	17,906	46.90%	20,275	53.10%	-2,369	-6.20%	38,181	15.08%
Unincorporated Area	Orange	38,694	56.59%	29,679	43.41%	9,015	13.19%	68,373	20.72%
Auburn	Placer	4,593	57.40%	3,409	42.60%	1,184	14.80%	8,002	12.26%
Colfax	Placer	454	51.13%	434	48.87%	20	2.25%	888	21.23%
Lincoln	Placer	16,398	53.15%	14,453	46.85%	1,945	6.30%	30,851	16.88%
Loomis	Placer	1,758	44.15%	2,224	55.85%	-466	-11.70%	3,982	21.77%
Rocklin	Placer	20,329	54.79%	16,776	45.21%	3,553	9.58%	37,105	16.15%
Roseville	Placer	43,814	55.30%	35,412	44.70%	8,402	10.61%	79,226	13.27%
Unincorporated Area	Placer	33,660	50.58%	32,891	49.42%	769	1.16%	66,551	16.44%
Portola	Plumas	413	50.37%	407	49.63%	6	0.73%	820	18.90%
Unincorporated Area	Plumas	4,457	49.42%	4,561	50.58%	-104	-1.15%	9,018	15.67%
Banning	Riverside	6,137	51.13%	5,865	48.87%	272	2.27%	12,002	5.69%
Beaumont	Riverside	11,739	49.02%	12,206	50.98%	-467	-1.95%	23,945	6.72%
Blythe	Riverside	1,496	45.03%	1,826	54.97%	-330	-9.93%	3,322	9.80%
Calimesa	Riverside	2,408	42.60%	3,245	57.40%	-837	-14.81%	5,653	16.53%
Canyon Lake	Riverside	2,681	40.86%	3,880	59.14%	-1,199	-18.27%	6,561	37.68%
Cathedral City	Riverside	13,628	72.74%	5,107	27.26%	8,521	45.48%	18,735	8.50%
Coachella	Riverside	5,615	63.18%	3,273	36.82%	2,342	26.35%	8,888	-0.49%
Corona	Riverside	31,017	50.41%	30,514	49.59%	503	0.82%	61,531	6.89%
Desert Hot Springs	Riverside	5,138	63.17%	2,996	36.83%	2,142	26.33%	8,134	10.18%
Eastvale	Riverside	12,966	48.73%	13,642	51.27%	-676	-2.54%	26,608	1.76%
Hemet	Riverside	14,490	49.37%	14,862	50.63%	-372	-1.27%	29,352	3.85%
Indian Wells	Riverside	1,666	60.58%	1,084	39.42%	582	21.16%	2,750	33.82%
Indio	Riverside	17,801	59.47%	12,134	40.53%	5,667	18.93%	29,935	10.25%
Jurupa Valley	Riverside	15,910	50.67%	15,489	49.33%	421	1.34%	31,399	2.84%
La Quinta	Riverside	11,678	61.01%	7,464	38.99%	4,214	22.01%	19,142	21.62%
Lake Elsinore	Riverside	13,114	51.27%	12,464	48.73%	650	2.54%	25,578	11.08%
Menifee	Riverside	25,068	48.43%	26,689	51.57%	-1,621	-3.13%	51,757	9.72%
Moreno Valley	Riverside	32,371	54.25%	27,297	45.75%	5,074	8.50%	59,668	-9.61%
Murrieta	Riverside	24,247	49.58%	24,661	50.42%	-414	-0.85%	48,908	17.11%
Norco	Riverside	4,510	40.31%	6,678	59.69%	-2,168	-19.38%	11,188	24.06%
Palm Desert	Riverside	16,869	65.92%	8,721	34.08%	8,148	31.84%	25,590	22.66%
Palm Springs	Riverside	20,704	86.66%	3,188	13.34%	17,516	73.31%	23,892	11.99%
Perris	Riverside	10,538	54.93%	8,648	45.07%	1,890	9.85%	19,186	-8.92%
Rancho Mirage	Riverside	8,508	75.05%	2,828	24.95%	5,680	50.11%	11,336	23.30%
Riverside	Riverside	58,200	55.24%	47,164	44.76%	11,036	10.47%	105,364	3.25%
San Jacinto	Riverside	7,347	48.35%	7,850	51.65%	-503	-3.31%	15,197	0.25%
Temecula	Riverside	27,417	54.19%	23,173	45.81%	4,244	8.39%	50,590	18.72%
Wildomar	Riverside	7,213	46.28%	8,373	53.72%	-1,160	-7.44%	15,586	18.24%
Unincorporated Area	Riverside	77,639	50.17%	77,107	49.83%	532	0.34%	154,746	12.30%
Citrus Heights	Sacramento	20,319	55.17%	16,514	44.83%	3,805	10.33%	36,833	16.41%
Elk Grove	Sacramento	46,311	59.34%	31,729	40.66%	14,582	18.69%	78,040	0.26%
Folsom	Sacramento	25,457	60.08%	16,917	39.92%	8,540	20.15%	42,374	13.76%
Galt	Sacramento	5,193	49.29%	5,343	50.71%	-150	-1.42%	10,536	16.39%
Isleton	Sacramento	158	59.40%	108	40.60%	50	18.80%	266	14.50%
Rancho Cordova	Sacramento	18,032	58.20%	12,953	41.80%	5,079	16.39%	30,985	5.13%
Sacramento	Sacramento	139,784	72.03%	54,280	27.97%	85,504	44.06%	194,064	-1.50%
Unincorporated Area	Sacramento	138,484	58.96%	96,379	41.04%	42,105	17.93%	234,863	9.81%
Hollister	San Benito	9,468	60.75%	6,117	39.25%	3,351	21.50%	15,585	0.36%
San Juan Bautista	San Benito	723	70.33%	305	29.67%	418	40.66%	1,028	8.76%
Unincorporated Area	San Benito	5,672	55.41%	4,565	44.59%	1,107	10.81%	10,237	13.30%
Adelanto	San Bernardino	4,058	52.10%	3,731	47.90%	327	4.20%	7,789	-6.88%
Apple Valley	San Bernardino	12,562	41.44%	17,752	58.56%	-5,190	-17.12%	30,314	11.31%
Barstow	San Bernardino	2,783	47.24%	3,108	52.76%	-325	-5.52%	5,891	8.32%
Big Bear Lake	San Bernardino	1,094	53.34%	957	46.66%	137	6.68%	2,051	23.34%
Chino	San Bernardino	16,911	49.43%	17,300	50.57%	-389	-1.14%	34,211	1.40%
Chino Hills	San Bernardino	16,740	49.07%	17,374	50.93%	-634	-1.86%	34,114	2.60%
Colton	San Bernardino	7,716	53.64%	6,668	46.36%	1,048	7.29%	14,384	-10.45%
Fontana	San Bernardino	35,810	52.31%	32,649	47.69%	3,161	4.62%	68,459	-7.75%
Grand Terrace	San Bernardino	2,665	48.80%	2,796	51.20%	-131	-2.40%	5,461	1.83%
Hesperia	San Bernardino	13,671	43.65%	17,648	56.35%	-3,977	-12.70%	31,319	10.62%
Highland	San Bernardino	9,337	50.25%	9,245	49.75%	92	0.50%	18,582	2.75%
Loma Linda	San Bernardino	4,584	50.83%	4,434	49.17%	150	1.66%	9,018	-9.67%
Montclair	San Bernardino	5,872	55.72%	4,666	44.28%	1,206	11.44%	10,538	-6.41%
Needles	San Bernardino	662	47.69%	726	52.31%	-64	-4.61%	1,388	15.46%
Ontario	San Bernardino	30,144	53.95%	25,727	46.05%	4,417	7.91%	55,871	-3.45%
Rancho Cucamonga	San Bernardino	37,498	49.62%	38,075	50.38%	-577	-0.76%	75,573	3.04%
Redlands	San Bernardino	18,674	55.79%	14,796	44.21%	3,878	11.59%	33,470	5.77%
Rialto	San Bernardino	15,977	52.84%	14,259	47.16%	1,718	5.68%	30,236	-14.62%
San Bernardino	San Bernardino	27,804	53.92%	23,760	46.08%	4,044	7.84%	51,564	-6.32%
Twentynine Palms	San Bernardino	2,978	57.94%	2,162	42.06%	816	15.88%	5,140	25.21%
Upland	San Bernardino	18,342	53.10%	16,198	46.90%	2,144	6.21%	34,540	5.69%
Victorville	San Bernardino	18,372	50.25%	18,191	49.75%	181	0.50%	36,563	-2.33%
Yucaipa	San Bernardino	10,347	40.44%	15,236	59.56%	-4,889	-19.11%	25,583	15.56%
Yucca Valley	San Bernardino	4,567	51.78%	4,253	48.22%	314	3.56%	8,820	23.86%
Unincorporated Area	San Bernardino	48,941	47.44%	54,213	52.56%	-5,272	-5.11%	103,154	13.21%
Carlsbad	San Diego	45,730	68.61%	20,925	31.39%	24,805	37.21%	66,655	20.24%
Chula Vista	San Diego	67,174	60.17%	44,461	39.83%	22,713	20.35%	111,635	3.46%
Coronado	San Diego	6,087	67.78%	2,894	32.22%	3,193	35.55%	8,981	28.51%
Del Mar	San Diego	2,050	76.81%	619	23.19%	1,431	53.62%	2,669	26.31%
El Cajon	San Diego	17,798	52.89%	15,851	47.11%	1,947	5.79%	33,649	19.20%
Encinitas	San Diego	27,977	75.85%	8,909	24.15%	19,068	51.69%	36,886	19.72%
Escondido	San Diego	31,977	59.43%	21,828	40.57%	10,149	18.86%	53,805	11.51%
Imperial Beach	San Diego	5,405	61.76%	3,346	38.24%	2,059	23.53%	8,751	18.50%
La Mesa	San Diego	20,144	70.47%	8,442	29.53%	11,702	40.94%	28,586	13.89%
Lemon Grove	San Diego	6,523	61.83%	4,027	38.17%	2,496	23.66%	10,550	2.28%
National City	San Diego	9,292	59.18%	6,409	40.82%	2,883	18.36%	15,701	0.00%
Oceanside	San Diego	49,993	62.63%	29,833	37.37%	20,160	25.25%	79,826	13.93%
Poway	San Diego	16,168	62.04%	9,892	37.96%	6,276	24.08%	26,060	19.09%
San Diego	San Diego	426,945	72.80%	159,550	27.20%	267,395	45.59%	586,495	11.96%
San Marcos	San Diego	25,834	63.71%	14,718	36.29%	11,116	27.41%	40,552	14.33%
Santee	San Diego	16,460	57.09%	12,374	42.91%	4,086	14.17%	28,834	26.52%
Solana Beach	San Diego	5,959	76.51%	1,830	23.49%	4,129	53.01%	7,789	22.65%
Vista	San Diego	23,083	62.33%	13,949	37.67%	9,134	24.67%	37,032	14.10%
Unincorporated Area	San Diego	124,878	53.59%	108,154	46.41%	16,724	7.18%	233,032	21.34%
San Francisco	San Francisco	327,877	84.74%	59,058	15.26%	268,819	69.47%	386,935	4.67%
Escalon	San Joaquin	1,363	40.30%	2,019	59.70%	-656	-19.40%	3,382	18.71%
Lathrop	San Joaquin	6,164	54.36%	5,176	45.64%	988	8.71%	11,340	-0.87%
Lodi	San Joaquin	12,129	48.31%	12,978	51.69%	-849	-3.38%	25,107	15.58%
Manteca	San Joaquin	16,817	51.64%	15,749	48.36%	1,068	3.28%	32,566	8.89%
Ripon	San Joaquin	3,055	38.08%	4,968	61.92%	-1,913	-23.84%	8,023	15.00%
Stockton	San Joaquin	48,310	56.72%	36,869	43.28%	11,441	13.43%	85,179	-3.23%
Tracy	San Joaquin	18,033	56.25%	14,026	43.75%	4,007	12.50%	32,059	2.39%
Mountain House	San Joaquin	3,973	54.09%	3,372	45.91%	601	8.18%	7,345	-6.65%
Unincorporated Area	San Joaquin	20,284	44.11%	25,701	55.89%	-5,417	-11.78%	45,985	12.33%
Arroyo Grande	San Luis Obispo	6,075	57.21%	4,543	42.79%	1,532	14.43%	10,618	5.27%
Atascadero	San Luis Obispo	8,861	55.11%	7,217	44.89%	1,644	10.23%	16,078	9.70%
El Paso de Robles	San Luis Obispo	7,470	53.03%	6,617	46.97%	853	6.06%	14,087	10.63%
Grover Beach	San Luis Obispo	3,604	59.34%	2,469	40.66%	1,135	18.69%	6,073	8.17%
Morro Bay	San Luis Obispo	4,411	66.41%	2,231	33.59%	2,180	32.82%	6,642	5.82%
Pismo Beach	San Luis Obispo	2,965	57.35%	2,205	42.65%	760	14.70%	5,170	7.23%
San Luis Obispo	San Luis Obispo	18,173	77.00%	5,428	23.00%	12,745	54.00%	23,601	5.00%
Unincorporated Area	San Luis Obispo	35,497	55.86%	28,054	44.14%	7,443	11.71%	63,551	10.04%
Atherton	San Mateo	2,888	77.70%	829	22.30%	2,059	55.39%	3,717	11.71%
Belmont	San Mateo	10,451	78.73%	2,824	21.27%	7,627	57.45%	13,275	1.86%
Brisbane	San Mateo	1,764	78.96%	470	21.04%	1,294	57.92%	2,234	1.67%
Burlingame	San Mateo	11,285	77.27%	3,319	22.73%	7,966	54.55%	14,604	3.39%
Colma	San Mateo	370	68.14%	173	31.86%	197	36.28%	543	-9.38%
Daly City	San Mateo	21,165	67.52%	10,183	32.48%	10,982	35.03%	31,348	-7.03%
East Palo Alto	San Mateo	4,322	68.73%	1,966	31.27%	2,356	37.47%	6,288	-20.24%
Foster City	San Mateo	9,743	72.28%	3,736	27.72%	6,007	44.57%	13,479	-2.79%
Half Moon Bay	San Mateo	4,871	78.91%	1,302	21.09%	3,569	57.82%	6,173	7.03%
Hillsborough	San Mateo	4,453	72.22%	1,713	27.78%	2,740	44.44%	6,166	9.97%
Menlo Park	San Mateo	13,117	82.84%	2,717	17.16%	10,400	65.68%	15,834	0.32%
Millbrae	San Mateo	6,431	64.02%	3,614	35.98%	2,817	28.04%	10,045	-2.36%
Pacifica	San Mateo	15,163	76.62%	4,627	23.38%	10,536	53.24%	19,790	4.36%
Portola Valley	San Mateo	2,536	85.44%	432	14.56%	2,104	70.89%	2,968	9.16%
Redwood City	San Mateo	25,897	78.55%	7,073	21.45%	18,824	57.09%	32,970	0.75%
San Bruno	San Mateo	12,180	70.04%	5,211	29.96%	6,969	40.07%	17,391	-0.01%
San Carlos	San Mateo	13,791	81.48%	3,134	18.52%	10,657	62.97%	16,925	3.99%
San Mateo	San Mateo	33,230	77.46%	9,669	22.54%	23,561	54.92%	42,899	2.58%
South San Francisco	San Mateo	16,874	68.18%	7,874	31.82%	9,000	36.37%	24,748	-7.09%
Woodside	San Mateo	2,662	80.33%	652	19.67%	2,010	60.65%	3,314	13.12%
Unincorporated Area	San Mateo	23,531	79.56%	6,044	20.44%	17,487	59.13%	29,575	2.69%
Buellton	Santa Barbara	1,660	61.25%	1,050	38.75%	610	22.51%	2,710	13.21%
Carpinteria	Santa Barbara	4,493	71.08%	1,828	28.92%	2,665	42.16%	6,321	0.08%
Goleta	Santa Barbara	11,273	71.98%	4,388	28.02%	6,885	43.96%	15,661	1.63%
Guadalupe	Santa Barbara	1,074	51.81%	999	48.19%	75	3.62%	2,073	-10.18%
Lompoc	Santa Barbara	7,302	56.04%	5,727	43.96%	1,575	12.09%	13,029	4.36%
Santa Barbara	Santa Barbara	33,423	79.50%	8,620	20.50%	24,803	58.99%	42,043	2.89%
Santa Maria	Santa Barbara	13,088	51.74%	12,210	48.26%	878	3.47%	25,298	1.93%
Solvang	Santa Barbara	1,920	61.01%	1,227	38.99%	693	22.02%	3,147	12.39%
Unincorporated Area	Santa Barbara	43,143	64.03%	24,235	35.97%	18,908	28.06%	67,378	9.81%
Campbell	Santa Clara	14,333	73.70%	5,115	26.30%	9,218	47.40%	19,448	2.41%
Cupertino	Santa Clara	16,334	66.98%	8,054	33.02%	8,280	33.95%	24,388	-10.26%
Gilroy	Santa Clara	14,620	63.95%	8,242	36.05%	6,378	27.90%	22,862	1.26%
Los Altos	Santa Clara	13,892	78.68%	3,764	21.32%	10,128	57.36%	17,656	-1.45%
Los Altos Hills	Santa Clara	3,729	75.08%	1,238	24.92%	2,491	50.15%	4,967	4.17%
Los Gatos	Santa Clara	13,633	75.86%	4,339	24.14%	9,294	51.71%	17,972	7.19%
Milpitas	Santa Clara	15,370	61.67%	9,551	38.33%	5,819	23.35%	24,921	-3.25%
Monte Sereno	Santa Clara	1,637	74.31%	566	25.69%	1,071	48.62%	2,203	14.58%
Morgan Hill	Santa Clara	14,292	66.08%	7,336	33.92%	6,956	32.16%	21,628	5.64%
Mountain View	Santa Clara	24,965	80.31%	6,119	19.69%	18,846	60.63%	31,084	-1.57%
Palo Alto	Santa Clara	26,825	81.56%	6,066	18.44%	20,759	63.11%	32,891	-1.28%
San Jose	Santa Clara	243,975	68.05%	114,552	31.95%	129,423	36.10%	358,527	0.23%
Santa Clara	Santa Clara	28,970	69.63%	12,634	30.37%	16,336	39.27%	41,604	-2.22%
Saratoga	Santa Clara	11,674	66.92%	5,772	33.08%	5,902	33.83%	17,446	-7.37%
Sunnyvale	Santa Clara	37,111	72.21%	14,282	27.79%	22,829	44.42%	51,393	-4.02%
Unincorporated Area	Santa Clara	23,888	68.92%	10,773	31.08%	13,115	37.84%	34,661	5.26%
Capitola	Santa Cruz	4,417	80.25%	1,087	19.75%	3,330	60.50%	5,504	5.56%
Santa Cruz	Santa Cruz	27,210	89.18%	3,301	10.82%	23,909	78.36%	30,511	6.08%
Scotts Valley	Santa Cruz	5,298	74.24%	1,838	25.76%	3,460	48.49%	7,136	5.58%
Watsonville	Santa Cruz	9,466	68.44%	4,365	31.56%	5,101	36.88%	13,831	-6.98%
Unincorporated Area	Santa Cruz	57,579	78.70%	15,583	21.30%	41,996	57.40%	73,162	7.27%
Anderson	Shasta	1,682	40.40%	2,481	59.60%	-799	-19.19%	4,163	21.11%
Redding	Shasta	18,958	44.72%	23,434	55.28%	-4,476	-10.56%	42,392	18.09%
Shasta Lake	Shasta	1,945	42.88%	2,591	57.12%	-646	-14.24%	4,536	20.16%
Unincorporated Area	Shasta	12,135	35.91%	21,655	64.09%	-9,520	-28.17%	33,790	17.92%
Loyalton	Sierra	115	34.95%	214	65.05%	-99	-30.09%	329	11.89%
Unincorporated Area	Sierra	648	47.44%	718	52.56%	-70	-5.12%	1,366	14.79%
Dorris	Siskiyou	81	34.32%	155	65.68%	-74	-31.36%	236	10.51%
Dunsmuir	Siskiyou	458	65.52%	241	34.48%	217	31.04%	699	9.42%
Etna	Siskiyou	152	45.24%	184	54.76%	-32	-9.52%	336	19.09%
Fort Jones	Siskiyou	116	40.14%	173	59.86%	-57	-19.72%	289	10.74%
Montague	Siskiyou	238	39.60%	363	60.40%	-125	-20.80%	601	22.71%
Mt. Shasta	Siskiyou	1,184	66.67%	592	33.33%	592	33.33%	1,776	13.27%
Tulelake	Siskiyou	59	42.75%	79	57.25%	-20	-14.49%	138	10.69%
Weed	Siskiyou	460	55.02%	376	44.98%	84	10.05%	836	12.71%
Yreka	Siskiyou	1,460	47.01%	1,646	52.99%	-186	-5.99%	3,106	18.98%
Unincorporated Area	Siskiyou	5,747	45.25%	6,953	54.75%	-1,206	-9.50%	12,700	15.11%
Benicia	Solano	11,465	72.61%	4,324	27.39%	7,141	45.23%	15,789	7.42%
Dixon	Solano	4,838	52.47%	4,383	47.53%	455	4.93%	9,221	9.83%
Fairfield	Solano	26,701	60.63%	17,339	39.37%	9,362	21.26%	44,040	-5.31%
Rio Vista	Solano	3,956	61.38%	2,489	38.62%	1,467	22.76%	6,445	0.97%
Suisun City	Solano	6,519	60.75%	4,212	39.25%	2,307	21.50%	10,731	-9.96%
Vacaville	Solano	24,255	56.52%	18,656	43.48%	5,599	13.05%	42,911	10.92%
Vallejo	Solano	29,447	66.33%	14,945	33.67%	14,502	32.67%	44,392	-13.00%
Unincorporated Area	Solano	4,546	50.52%	4,452	49.48%	94	1.04%	8,998	14.50%
Cloverdale	Sonoma	2,797	69.80%	1,210	30.20%	1,587	39.61%	4,007	9.13%
Cotati	Sonoma	2,965	77.01%	885	22.99%	2,080	54.03%	3,850	8.71%
Healdsburg	Sonoma	4,840	80.53%	1,170	19.47%	3,670	61.06%	6,010	3.53%
Petaluma	Sonoma	25,970	78.80%	6,985	21.20%	18,985	57.61%	32,955	7.84%
Rohnert Park	Sonoma	14,701	72.51%	5,573	27.49%	9,128	45.02%	20,274	8.44%
Santa Rosa	Sonoma	60,626	76.06%	19,087	23.94%	41,539	52.11%	79,713	3.13%
Sebastopol	Sonoma	4,019	88.04%	546	11.96%	3,473	76.08%	4,565	6.21%
Sonoma	Sonoma	5,061	79.85%	1,277	20.15%	3,784	59.70%	6,338	5.71%
Windsor	Sonoma	9,221	68.68%	4,206	31.32%	5,015	37.35%	13,427	6.36%
Unincorporated Area	Sonoma	54,033	75.76%	17,286	24.24%	36,747	51.52%	71,319	6.67%
Ceres	Stanislaus	7,354	51.47%	6,933	48.53%	421	2.95%	14,287	4.23%
Hughson	Stanislaus	1,355	41.87%	1,881	58.13%	-526	-16.25%	3,236	16.46%
Modesto	Stanislaus	39,767	53.24%	34,929	46.76%	4,838	6.48%	74,696	7.89%
Newman	Stanislaus	1,842	50.45%	1,809	49.55%	33	0.90%	3,651	3.91%
Oakdale	Stanislaus	4,273	43.10%	5,642	56.90%	-1,369	-13.81%	9,915	20.40%
Patterson	Stanislaus	4,658	59.71%	3,143	40.29%	1,515	19.42%	7,801	3.69%
Riverbank	Stanislaus	4,443	49.34%	4,561	50.66%	-118	-1.31%	9,004	9.29%
Turlock	Stanislaus	12,801	48.49%	13,599	51.51%	-798	-3.02%	26,400	12.47%
Waterford	Stanislaus	1,289	41.67%	1,804	58.33%	-515	-16.65%	3,093	14.64%
Unincorporated Area	Stanislaus	15,570	42.43%	21,130	57.57%	-5,560	-15.15%	36,700	12.32%
Live Oak	Sutter	1,346	44.03%	1,711	55.97%	-365	-11.94%	3,057	5.39%
Yuba City	Sutter	11,283	45.32%	13,612	54.68%	-2,329	-9.36%	24,895	16.97%
Unincorporated Area	Sutter	3,399	35.66%	6,134	64.34%	-2,735	-28.69%	9,533	20.84%
Corning	Tehama	836	43.70%	1,077	56.30%	-241	-12.60%	1,913	9.67%
Red Bluff	Tehama	2,230	45.92%	2,626	54.08%	-396	-8.15%	4,856	21.93%
Tehama	Tehama	85	44.74%	105	55.26%	-20	-10.53%	190	14.86%
Unincorporated Area	Tehama	6,584	35.32%	12,057	64.68%	-5,473	-29.36%	18,641	17.74%
Unincorporated Area	Trinity	2,873	52.55%	2,594	47.45%	279	5.10%	5,467	14.49%
Dinuba	Tulare	2,594	46.06%	3,038	53.94%	-444	-7.88%	5,632	-2.30%
Exeter	Tulare	1,369	37.28%	2,303	62.72%	-934	-25.44%	3,672	11.96%
Farmersville	Tulare	1,014	51.73%	946	48.27%	68	3.47%	1,960	-1.45%
Lindsay	Tulare	1,078	51.28%	1,024	48.72%	54	2.57%	2,102	-7.36%
Porterville	Tulare	6,807	46.88%	7,714	53.12%	-907	-6.25%	14,521	7.63%
Tulare	Tulare	8,396	42.67%	11,279	57.33%	-2,883	-14.65%	19,675	8.49%
Visalia	Tulare	23,402	45.77%	27,722	54.23%	-4,320	-8.45%	51,124	11.28%
Woodlake	Tulare	837	52.94%	744	47.06%	93	5.88%	1,581	-5.71%
Unincorporated Area	Tulare	13,007	39.13%	20,230	60.87%	-7,223	-21.73%	33,237	7.77%
Sonora	Tuolumne	1,300	57.07%	978	42.93%	322	14.14%	2,278	16.23%
Unincorporated Area	Tuolumne	11,635	45.33%	14,032	54.67%	-2,397	-9.34%	25,667	14.28%
Camarillo	Ventura	22,304	59.18%	15,385	40.82%	6,919	18.36%	37,689	9.95%
Fillmore	Ventura	3,524	56.78%	2,682	43.22%	842	13.57%	6,206	3.66%
Moorpark	Ventura	10,907	60.07%	7,250	39.93%	3,657	20.14%	18,157	11.12%
Ojai	Ventura	3,389	78.20%	945	21.80%	2,444	56.39%	4,334	12.86%
Oxnard	Ventura	37,421	63.73%	21,295	36.27%	16,126	27.46%	58,716	-4.64%
Port Hueneme	Ventura	4,569	63.69%	2,605	36.31%	1,964	27.38%	7,174	1.27%
San Buenaventura	Ventura	37,424	67.11%	18,340	32.89%	19,084	34.22%	55,764	8.40%
Santa Paula	Ventura	5,789	57.73%	4,238	42.27%	1,551	15.47%	10,027	-6.25%
Simi Valley	Ventura	34,963	55.07%	28,527	44.93%	6,436	10.14%	63,490	14.29%
Thousand Oaks	Ventura	43,986	63.95%	24,799	36.05%	19,187	27.89%	68,785	14.70%
Unincorporated Area	Ventura	28,673	63.33%	16,605	36.67%	12,068	26.65%	45,278	13.94%
Davis	Yolo	26,367	85.75%	4,381	14.25%	21,986	71.50%	30,748	0.60%
West Sacramento	Yolo	13,798	64.29%	7,665	35.71%	6,133	28.57%	21,463	5.92%
Winters	Yolo	2,103	60.80%	1,356	39.20%	747	21.60%	3,459	9.11%
Woodland	Yolo	14,951	60.98%	9,566	39.02%	5,385	21.96%	24,517	4.36%
Unincorporated Area	Yolo	6,438	63.08%	3,768	36.92%	2,670	26.16%	10,206	11.67%
Marysville	Yuba	1,860	48.95%	1,940	51.05%	-80	-2.11%	3,800	22.12%
Wheatland	Yuba	677	41.71%	946	58.29%	-269	-16.57%	1,623	21.15%
Unincorporated Area	Yuba	10,287	44.96%	12,593	55.04%	-2,306	-10.08%	22,880	15.19%
Totals		9,477,435	62.62%	5,658,187	37.38%	3,819,248	25.23%	15,135,622	5.09%

Cities & Unincorporated Areas that voted "Yes" on Proposition 3 and for Donald Trump

- Jackson (Amador)
- Sutter Creek (Amador)
- Crescent City (Del Norte)
- Unincorporated Area (El Dorado)
- Fortuna (Humboldt)
- Rio Dell (Humboldt)
- Unincorporated Area (Inyo)
- Avenal (Kings)
- Corcoran (Kings)
- Unincorporated Area (Lake)
- Beverly Hills (Los Angeles)
- Bradbury (Los Angeles)
- Glendora (Los Angeles)
- La Verne (Los Angeles)
- Rolling Hills (Los Angeles)
- San Dimas (Los Angeles)
- Brea (Orange)
- Dana Point (Orange)
- Fountain Valley (Orange)
- Garden Grove (Orange)
- Huntington Beach (Orange)
- Mission Viejo (Orange)
- Newport Beach (Orange)
- Rancho Santa Margarita (Orange)
- San Clemente (Orange)
- San Juan Capistrano (Orange)
- Westminster (Orange)
- Unincorporated Area (Orange)
- Colfax (Placer)
- Lincoln (Placer)
- Rocklin (Placer)
- Roseville (Placer)
- Unincorporated Area (Placer)
- Portola (Plumas)
- Banning (Riverside)
- Corona (Riverside)
- Indian Wells (Riverside)
- Jurupa Valley (Riverside)
- Lake Elsinore (Riverside)
- Temecula (Riverside)
- Unincorporated Area (Riverside)
- Citrus Heights (Sacramento)
- Unincorporated Area (San Benito)
- Big Bear Lake (San Bernardino)
- Highland (San Bernardino)
- Twentynine Palms (San Bernardino)
- Yucca Valley (San Bernardino)
- El Cajon (San Diego)
- Santee (San Diego)
- Unincorporated Area (San Diego)
- Manteca (San Joaquin)
- El Paso de Robles (San Luis Obispo)
- Weed (Siskiyou)
- Dixon (Solano)
- Unincorporated Area (Solano)
- Ceres (Stanislaus)
- Modesto (Stanislaus)
- Newman (Stanislaus)
- Unincorporated Area (Trinity)
- Sonora (Tuolumne)
- Simi Valley (Ventura)

Cities & Unincorporated Areas that voted "No" on Proposition 3 and for Kamala Harris

- Williams (Colusa)
- Sanger (Fresno)
- Selma (Fresno)
- El Centro (Imperial)
- Westmorland (Imperial)
- Diamond Bar (Los Angeles)
- La Mirada (Los Angeles)

== Analysis ==
18 counties (Butte, El Dorado, Inyo, Lake, Los Angeles, Nevada, Orange, Placer, Riverside, Sacramento, San Benito, San Bernardino, San Diego, San Joaquin, San Luis Obispo, Solano, Trinity and Ventura) flipped from Yes on Proposition 8 in 2008 to Yes on Proposition 3 in 2024, while no counties flipped in the opposite direction.

While Alpine, Mono and Yolo were the only interior counties to vote against Proposition 8, 15 interior counties (Alpine, Butte, El Dorado, Inyo, Lake, Mono, Nevada, Placer, Riverside, Sacramento, San Benito, San Bernardino, San Joaquin, Trinity and Yolo) voted in favor of Proposition 3. While seven coastal counties (Del Norte, Los Angeles, Orange, San Diego, San Luis Obispo, Solano and Ventura) voted for Proposition 8, Del Norte was the only coastal county to vote against Proposition 3.

Butte, El Dorado, Inyo, Lake, Placer, Riverside, San Bernardino, San Joaquin, and Trinity counties voted for Donald Trump in the concurrent presidential election and voted for Proposition 3. No county voted for Kamala Harris and against Proposition 3.

== See also ==
- 2008 California Proposition 8
- 2024 Colorado Amendment J
- 2024 Hawaii Amendment 1
- 2024 United States ballot measures
- List of California ballot propositions
- Same-sex marriage in California
