= List of California ballot propositions: 1990–1999 =

This is a list of California ballot propositions from 1990 to 1999.

== Elections ==
=== June 5, 1990 ===
- 107 – Passed – Housing And Homeless Bond Act Of 1990.
- 108 – Passed – Passenger Rail And Clean Air Bond Act Of 1990
- 109 – Passed – Governor's Review Of Legislation. Legislative Deadlines.
- 110 – Passed – Property Tax Exemption For Severely Disabled Persons.
- 111 – Passed – The Traffic Congestion Relief And Spending Limitation Act Of 1990.
- 112 – Passed – State Officials, Ethics, Salaries. Open Meetings.
- 113 – Passed – Practice Of Chiropractic. Legislative Initiative Amendment.
- 114 – Passed – Murder Of A Peace Officer. Criminal Penalties. Special Circumstance. Peace Officer Definition.
- 115 – Passed – Criminal Law.
- 116 – Passed – Rail Transportation. Bond Act.
- 117 – Passed – Wildlife Protection.
- 118 – Failed – Legislature. Reapportionment. Ethics.
- 119 – Failed – Reapportionment By Commission. Initiative. Constitutional Amendment And Statute.
- 120 – Passed – New Prison Construction Bond Act Of 1990.
- 121 – Passed – Higher Education Facilities Bond Act Of June 1990.
- 122 – Passed – Earthquake Safety And Public Buildings Rehabilitation Bond Act Of 1990.
- 123 – Passed – 1990 School Facilities Bond Act.

=== November 6, 1990 ===
- 124 – Failed – Local Hospital Districts.
- 125 – Failed – Motor Vehicle Tax. Rail Transit Funding.
- 126 – Failed – Alcoholic Beverages. Taxes.
- 127 – Passed – Earthquake Safety. Property Tax Exclusion.
- 128 – Failed – Environment. Public Health. Bonds.
- 129 – Failed – Drug Enforcement, Prevention, Treatment, Prisons. Bonds.
- 130 – Failed – Forest Acquisition. Timber Harvesting Practices. Bond Act.
- 131 – Failed – Limits On Terms Of Office. Ethics. Campaign Financing.
- 132 – Passed – Marine Resources. Initiative Constitutional Amendment.
- 133 – Failed – Drug Enforcement And Prevention. Taxes. Prison Terms.
- 134 – Failed – Alcohol Surtax.
- 135 – Failed – Pesticide Regulation.
- 136 – Failed – State, Local Taxation.
- 137 – Failed – Initiative And Referendum Process.
- 138 – Failed – Forestry Programs. Timber Harvesting Practices.
- 139 – Passed – Prison Inmate Labor. Tax Credit.
- 140 – Passed – Limits On Terms Of Office, Legislators' Retirement, Legislative Operating Costs.
- 141 – Failed – Toxic Chemical Discharge. Public Agencies. Legislative Statute.
- 142 – Passed – Veterans' Bond Act Of 1990.
- 143 – Failed – Higher Education Facilities Bond Act Of November 1990.
- 144 – Failed – New Prison Construction Bond Act Of 1990-B.
- 145 – Failed – California Housing Bond Act Of 1990.
- 146 – Passed – School Facilities Bond Act Of 1990.
- 147 – Failed – County Correctional Facility Capital Expenditure And Juvenile Facility Bond Act Of 1990.
- 148 – Failed – Water Resources Bond Act Of 1990.
- 149 – Failed – California Park, Recreation, And Wildlife Enhancement Act Of 1990.
- 150 – Failed – County Courthouse Facility Capital Expenditure Bond Act Of 1990.
- 151 – Failed – Child Care Facilities Financing Act Of 1990.

=== June 2, 1992 ===
- 152 – Passed – School Facilities Bond Act of 1992
- 153 – Passed – Higher Education Facilities Bond Act of June 1992
- 154 – Failed – Property Tax Postponement.

=== November 3, 1992 ===
- 155 – Passed – 1992 School Facilities Bond Act.
- 156 – Failed – Passenger Rail and Clean Air Bond Act of 1992.
- 157 – Failed – Toll Roads and Highways.
- 158 – Failed – Office of California Analyst.
- 159 – Failed – Office of the Auditor General.
- 160 – Passed – Property Tax Exemption.
- 161 – Failed – Physician-Assisted Death. Terminal Condition.
- 162 – Passed – Public Employees' Retirement Systems.
- 163 – Passed – Ends Taxation of Certain Food Products.
- 164 – Passed – Congressional Term Limits.
- 165 – Failed – Budget Process. Welfare. Procedural and Substantive Changes.
- 166 – Failed – Basic Health Care Coverage.
- 167 – Failed – State Taxes.

=== November 2, 1993 ===
- 168 – Failed – Low Rent Housing Projects.
- 169 – Failed – Budget Implementation.
- 170 – Failed – Property Taxes. Schools. Development-Fee Limits.
- 171 – Passed – Property Taxation. Transfer of Base Year Value.
- 172 – Passed – Local Public Safety Protection and Improvement Act of 1993.
- 173 – Failed – California Housing and Jobs Investment Bond Act. $185 Million Legislative Bond Act.
- 174 – Failed – Education. Vouchers.

=== June 7, 1994 ===
- 1A – Failed – Earthquake Relief and Seismic Retrofit Bond Act of 1994.
- 1B – Failed – School Facilities Bond Act of 1994.
- 1C – Failed – Higher Education Facilities Bond Act of June 1994.
- 175 – Failed – Renters' Income Tax Credit.
- 176 – Passed – Taxation: Nonprofit Organizations.
- 177 – Passed – Property Tax Exemption. Disabled Persons' Access.
- 178 – Failed – Property Tax Exclusion. Water Conservation Equipment.
- 179 – Passed – Murder: Punishment.
- 180 – Failed – Park Lands, Historic Sites, Wildlife and Forest Conservation Bond Act.

=== November 8, 1994 ===
- 181 – Failed – Passenger Rail and Clean Air Bond Act of 1994.
- 182 – Passed by voters, but courts struck it down.
- 183 – Passed – Recall Elections. State Officers.
- 184 – Passed – Increased Sentences. Repeat Offenders (Three Strikes)
- 185 – Failed – Public Transportation Trust Funds. Gasoline Sales Tax. Initiative Statute.
- 186 – Failed – Health Services. Taxes.
- 187 – Passed – Illegal Aliens. Ineligibility for Public Services. Verification and Reporting.
- 188 – Failed – Smoking and Tobacco Products. Local Preemption. Statewide Regulation.
- 189 – Passed – Bail Exception. Felony Sexual Assault.
- 190 – Passed – Commission on Judicial Performance.
- 191 – Passed – Abolish Justice Courts

=== March 26, 1996 ===
- 192 – Passed – Seismic Retrofit Bond Act of 1996.
- 193 – Passed – Property Appraisal. Exception. Grandparent-Grandchild Transfer.
- 194 – Passed – Prisoners. Joint Venture Program. Unemployment Benefits. Parole.
- 195 – Passed – Punishment. Special Circumstances. Carjacking. Murder of Juror.
- 196 – Passed – Punishment for Murder. Special Circumstances. Drive-By Shootings.
- 197 – Failed – Amendment of the California Wildlife Protection Act of 1990 (Proposition 117). Mountain Lions.
- 198 – Passed – Elections. Open Primary.
- 199 – Failed – Limits on Mobilehome Rent Control. Low-Income Rental Assistance. Initiative Statute.
- 200 – Failed – No-Fault Motor Vehicle Insurance. Initiative Statute.
- 201 – Failed – Attorneys' Fees. Shareholder Actions. Class Actions.
- 202 – Failed – Attorneys' Contingent Fees. Limits.
- 203 – Passed – Public Education Facilities Bond Act of 1996.

=== November 5, 1996 ===
- 204 – Passed – Safe, Clean, Reliable Water Supply Act.
- 205 – Failed – Youthful and Adult Offender Local Facilities Bond Act of 1996.
- 206 – Passed – Veterans' Bond Act of 1996.
- 207 – Failed – Attorneys. Fees. Right to Negotiate. Frivolous Lawsuits.
- 208 – Passed – Campaign Contributions and Spending Limits. Restricts Lobbyists.
- 209 – Passed – Prohibition Against Discrimination or Preferential Treatment by State and Other Public Entities.
- 210 – Passed – Minimum Wage Increase.
- 211 – Failed – Attorney-Client Fee Arrangements. Securities Fraud. Lawsuits.
- 212 – Failed – Campaign Contributions and Spending Limits. Repeals Gift and Honoraria Limits. Restricts Lobbyists.
- 213 – Passed – Limitation on Recovery to Felons, Uninsured Motorists, Drunk Drivers.
- 214 – Failed – Health Care. Consumer Protection. Initiative Statute.
- 215 – Passed – Compassionate Use Act of 1996. Medical Use of Marijuana.
- 216 – Failed – Health Care. Consumer Protection. Taxes on Corporate Restructuring.
- 217 – Failed – Top Income Tax Brackets. Reinstatement. Revenues to Local Agencies.
- 218 – Passed – Voter Approval for Local Government Taxes. Limitations on Fees, Assessments, and Charges.

=== June 2, 1998 ===
- 219 – Passed – Ballot Measures. Application.
- 220 – Passed – Courts. Superior and Municipal Court Consolidation.
- 221 – Passed – Subordinate Judicial Officers. Discipline.
- 222 – Passed – Murder. Peace Officer Victim. Sentence Credits.
- 223 – Failed – Schools. Spending Limits on Administration.
- 224 – Failed – State-Funded Design and Engineering Services. Initiative Constitutional Amendment.
- 225 – Passed – Limiting Congressional Terms. Proposed U.S. Constitutional Amendment.
- 226 – Failed – Political Contributions by Employees, Union Members, Foreign Entities.
- 227 – Passed – English Language in Public Schools.

=== November 3, 1998 ===
- 1A – Passed – Class Size Reduction Kindergarten-University Public Education Facilities Bond Act of 1998.
- 1 – Passed – Property Taxes: Contaminated Property.
- 2 – Passed – Transportation: Funding.
- 3 – Failed – Partisan Presidential Primary Elections.
- 4 – Passed – Trapping Practices. Bans Use of Specified Traps and Animal Poisons.
- 5 – Passed – Tribal-State Gaming Compacts. Tribal Casinos.
- 6 – Passed – Criminal Law. Prohibition on Slaughter of Horses and Sale of Law. Prohibition on Slaughter of Horses and Sale of Horsemeat for Human Consumption.
- 7 – Failed – Air Quality Improvement. Tax Credits.
- 8 – Failed – Public Schools. Permanent Class Size Reduction. Parent- Teacher Councils. Teacher Credentialing. Pupil Suspension for Drug Possession. Chief Inspector's Office.
- 9 – Failed – Electric Utilities. Assessments. Bonds.
- 10 – Passed – State and County Early Childhood Development Programs. Additional Tobacco Surtax.
- 11 – Passed – Local Sales and Use Taxes—Revenue Sharing.
