= Peter Sperling =

American businessman (born 1960)

- Born: 1960 (age 65–66)
- Education: University of California at Santa Barbara; University of Phoenix
- Occupations: Chairman of Apollo Group; Chairman of CallWave
- Relatives: John Sperling

Peter V. Sperling (born 1960) is an American billionaire businessman. Sperling is the former chairman of Apollo Group, and CallWave, Inc.

== Early life and education ==
Sperling is the son of entrepreneur and educator John Sperling, co-founder of the University of Phoenix, and Sandra Sperling, who was also an educator and actively involved in the family's philanthropic endeavors. He earned his Bachelor of Arts degree in economics from the University of California at Santa Barbara and his MBA from the University of Phoenix.

== Career ==
Perter Sperling joined Apollo Education in 1986. He took over as chairman at the Apollo Education Group when his father retired in 2001. He remained in that position until 2017 when the group was bought and made private. This came as the University of Phoenix was facing a number of state and federal investigations into many of its practices.

After stepping down from Apollo, Sperling became joined CallWave, a communication services company, as chairman and a 19% owner.

== Political activity ==
Sperling sponsored and financially backed Proposition 7 of California's November 2008 general election. Also in 2008, Sperling was listed as one of the 400 wealthiest Americans. Sperling’s net worth is estimated at US$1.7 billion.
