= 2012 California Proposition 36 =

Referendum changing the three-strikes law

Proposition 36
- Three Strikes Law

Results
| Choice | Votes | % |
|---|---|---|
| Yes | 8,575,619 | 69.30% |
| No | 3,798,216 | 30.70% |
| Total votes | 12,373,835 | 100.00% |
| Registered voters/turnout | 18,245,970 | 67.82% |
- County results Yes 80–90% 70–80% 60–70% 50–60%

Proposition 36, also titled A Change in the "Three Strikes Law" Initiative, was a California ballot measure that was passed in November 2012 to modify California's Three Strikes Law (passed in 1994). The latter law punishes habitual offenders by establishing sentence escalation for crimes that were classified as "strikes", and requires a mandatory minimum sentence of 25 to life for a "third-strike offense."

Proposition 36 adjusted the law so that, in order to be classified as a third strike, the offense must be a "serious or violent felony". This serious or violent clause does not apply to defendants previously convicted of rape, murder or child molestation. Additionally, the initiative added a provision in the California Penal Code that establishes a review process of sentences for people currently serving life sentences as a result of a nonviolent or non-serious third-strike offenses; it allowed courts to provide shorter sentences or release.

Supporters of the proposition included Steve Cooley, the LA district attorney at the time, George Soros, and the NAACP. Opponents included Henry T. Nicholas, the author of California's Victims Bill of Rights, the California Police Chiefs’ Association, and the Criminal Justice Legal Foundation.

The proposition was passed on November 6, 2012, with 8,575,619 people (69.3%) voting Yes and 3,798,218 people (30.7%) voting No. It was passed by a majority of voters in every county.

== Background to Three Strikes Law ==
Proposition 36 was predated by two major trends since the late 20th century: rapidly increasing incarceration rates and the expansion of the private prison industry. Beginning with the 1970s, President Richard Nixon announced the "war on drugs," which led to 'tough on crime' policies by a range of politicians. Changes included mandatory minimum sentencing, harsh penalties barring inmates from being granted parole or probation, and stricter punishments for drug users both in and out of the prison. Neither party wanted to appear "soft on crime", and criminalization of minor offenses continued, resulting in high rates of incarceration. In response to but surpassing the growing numbers of inmates, the private prison industry expanded nearly 1600% between 1990-2009.

By 2011, private prison companies were responsible for about 6% of state prisoners and 16% of federal prisoners. Corrections Corporation of America (CCA), for example, in 2011 owned and operated 66 facilities, and it earned $1.7 billion in revenue. The rate of private prison expansion far outpaced the rate of overall growth in incarceration. By 2015, the two largest prison companies derived from 45 to 50% of their revenues from federal contracts and had incentives to keep prisons full.

As a result of the continuing war on crime in the 1990s, numerous states passed what are known as Three Strikes laws. Between December 1993 and January 1996, twenty-four states passed such laws, which were designed to punish repeat felons. Under these laws, criminals convicted of a second felony must receive a sentence twice as harsh as a first-time offender. A criminal convicted of a third felony, regardless of its violence or severity, is to be sentenced to a mandatory minimum of 25 years to life imprisonment. These laws limited the judges’ ability to exercise discretion when sentencing repeat criminals and required lengthy sentences even for non-violent crimes. Poor people of color have been disproportionately affected by the high rate of incarceration for even relatively minor offenses. In 2016 the United States had 5% of the population in the world and 25% of the world's prisoners.

The first Three Strike Law was passed in Washington State, with overwhelming support from the voters. Its passage was attributed to public outrage over the murder of Diane Ballasiotes, who was kidnapped, raped, and brutally stabbed by Gene Kane Jr., an escapee from Seattle work-release. Similar outrage in California arose over the murders of Kim Reynolds and Polly Klaas, both of whom were killed by repeat felons. California also passed a three strike law.

The three-strikes laws were representative of prevailing public dissatisfaction with the states’ policies regarding repeat offenders. Studies suggest that public concern is related to fears about threat related to crime, a threat repeatedly emphasized by politicians seeking support for re-election, and an opinion that courts were not dealing with it adequately. Most people have a fear of crime that does not realistically relate to their risk. Psychologists Zimring and Hawkins suggest that people are motivated to protect themselves and their communities from threats and thus support severe punishment. Also, people are motivated to punish criminals because rule-breaking behavior poses a threat to the moral cohesion of society; punishment reasserts social value and the obligation to obey social rules.

== Studies of effects of Three Strikes Law ==
Since Three Strikes has gone into effect in California, a number of studies have examined the effects of the law on sentencing patterns and crime levels. Overall, results from these studies have been mixed, with some concluding that Three Strikes has reduced crime rates, while others arguing it has had little impact if any.

A 1994 study by analyst Peter Greenwood and colleagues at RAND assessed potential effects of the proposed law. Relying mostly on projected data from statistical models, the authors predicted that three strikes could result in up to a 28% reduction in serious or violent crime, but questioned whether or not the public would be willing to fully fund the bill's estimated cost of $5.5 billion to support a much larger prison population serving lengthy sentences.

A study published in 2001 by Franklin Zimring and colleagues assessed the effects over several years of implementing the law and reached a more negative conclusion about its efficacy. Zimring examined samples of felony arrests from three major California cities between 1993 and 1995, and found that the group targeted by Three Strikes, namely people who had committed one or more serious or violent offenses, accounted for 10% of the total crime prior to the law's enactment; they did not differ significantly from the average criminal population. In terms of the law's effects, the study found that second-strike offenders were more likely to be punished, as well as to receive a longer average prison sentence than before, while third- strike offenders were sentenced to lengthier punishments. The authors conclude that Three Strikes could not be solely responsible for the large drop in aggregated California crime rates over the 1990s. This trend began before Three Strikes was enacted and continued at roughly the same rate of reduction afterward. Zimring argues that the law had only a weak deterrent effect on crime at best.

A 2002 study conducted by Joanna M. Shepherd claimed that both of the above studies underestimate the deterrent effect of the law because they examined only what she calls "partial deterrence" effects of three strikes: that is, deterring of those criminals committing a third strike. She suggests that if this was the case, the expected result would be a small general decrease in all felonies, as any felony can qualify for a third-strike offense. Using statistical regression models, Shepard found that the result was a stronger decrease in serious or violent felonies that qualify for first and second strikes; she concluded that the Three Strikes law deterred the general criminal population as well. She attributed the deterrence of nearly 400,000 crimes, the vast majority of which are burglaries, to the law in its first two years of enactment.

A 2001 study by criminologists Marvell and Moody found that homicide rates increased following the passage of Three Strikes Law. The authors argued that criminals, even when committing relatively minor crimes, were more motivated after the law to murder victims, witnesses, or law enforcement personnel in order to avoid apprehension and the mandatory harsh sentences. They found that the law would increase the total number of homicides in states enforcing three strikes laws by approximately 17%.

A study published in 2012 by John Sutton focused more on the law's effects on sentencing and imprisonment. Sutton evaluated whether or not probability and severity of sentencing increased under Three Strikes, whether or not average sentencing uncertainty declined, and whether or not race played a significant role in sentencing before and after Three Strikes. He concluded that Three Strikes did increase the number of prison sentences and their average length in California. However, he also found that there is "no evidence of systematic prosecutorial manipulation" as a result of Three Strikes sentencing.

In terms of race, Sutton found that black defendants were more likely to receive longer sentences under Three Strikes, but did not find other race-related effects of Three Strikes. He highlights the singular nature of this finding as worthy of further study.

== Criticisms of Three Strikes Law and movement towards Proposition 36 ==
Despite Proposition 184's easy passage, by the early 2000s many California citizens were beginning to consider reforming the law. Some common criticisms of the law include it resulting in prison overcrowding, inconsistent application of the law across the state, increasing costs of funding the growing prison population, and disillusion with particular applications of Three Strikes Law to minor offenses.

=== Immediate inmate population increase and dramatic increases in prison funding ===
Within the first four years of the implementation of Three Strikes Law, 40,511 people were convicted under the laws in California. The rapidly growing inmate population resulted in an additional $1 billion spent on adult corrections in four years, from approximately $3 billion to over $4 billion. According to the California Department of Corrections and Rehabilitation, the budget for fiscal year 2011-2012 has increased to $6.4 billion. In addition, with the AB900, the ballot that was signed into law in May 2007 granting $7.4 billion for prison expansion, taxpayers will shell out an average of $315,000 per bed for the projects.

In California specifically, citizens are concerned over the billions of dollars spent by the state legislature on prison construction in the past few years, including $500 million via SB 1022 and $1.2 billion through AB 900. A number of anti-prison organizations have developed. Among them is California United for a Responsible Budget (CURB). As a broad-based coalition of more than 40 organizations, CURB seeks to "curb" prison spending by reducing the number of people in prison and the number of prisons in the state. The group works to provide resources and broader exposure in the field of prison divestment and to increase the outreach possibilities to the prison abolition movement.

=== Clogging of courts ===
Under the Three Strikes Laws, there were more than 7,400 second and third-strike cases filed statewide at the end of August 1994. Historically, more than 90% of the defendants would plea bargain for more lenient sentence or dismissal of other charges. However, knowing the consequence of having three strikes, in 1995 plea bargaining with guilty pleas dropped to a frequency of 14% of defendants with second-strike cases and 6% of defendants with third-strike cases. As a result of the significant decrease in plea bargaining, prosecutors and public defenders face a high volume of jury trials, which are more expensive and which slow other business in the courts.

=== Inconsistent implementation ===
Instead of a uniformity of ruling, counties throughout California evaluate the seriousness of crime differently. In 1996, San Francisco County announced that the county would no longer pursue third-strike conviction against drug cases and non-violent felonies, as it had found juries unwilling to convict in such cases given the harsh consequences. On the other hand, prosecutors in San Diego County were willing to pursue Three Strikes conviction for any felonies. San Diego has sent more three-strike defendants to prison than any other county with a comparable violent crime rate.

=== Ewing v. California ===
In 2003, Gary Ewing was sentenced 25 years to life in prison after he committed his third felony, stealing three golf clubs from a local shop in California Under California law, certain offenses known as "wobblers" may be classified as either misdemeanors or felonies. The court refused to exercise its discretion to reduce the conviction to a misdemeanor for Ewing, which triggered the Three Strikes Law. Ewing appealed, saying that his sentence was grossly disproportionate to the crime under the Eighth Amendment, but the US Supreme Court affirmed the court's ruling in Ewing v. California. The harsh sentence and later ruling for a crime of shoplifting not only shocked many people but was also questioned by some judges. This controversial case can be seen to have led to getting Proposition 66 on the ballot.

=== Proposition 66 ===
In 2004, Proposition 66 was placed on the California ballot. Proposition 66 would limit felonies that trigger the second and third strike applications to violent or serious crimes and would increase penalties for child molesters. Supporters believed that it restored the original purpose of the Three Strikes Law to keep dangerous criminals in prison and off the streets. Proposition 66 was backed by Citizens Against Violent Crime, a California political action committee, and Sacramento businessman Jerry Keenan, whose son was serving time for manslaughter in a car accident. But, voters rejected proposition 66 with 52.7% no votes, reportedly due to fear that as many as 26,000 inmates would be released to the streets if it were passed.

== Support and opposition for Prop 36, 2012 ==
=== Support ===
Proponents argued that Proposition 36 would remove "draconian" standards of doling out punishment for third felonies that are neither serious nor violent. They claimed that the proposition presents rather modest reforms that would eliminate overly harsh sentencing of minor felonies, while keeping serious career criminals behind bars. They noted that repeat offenders would continue to serve longer sentences under Proposition 36. Supporters rejected opponents’ claims that Prop 36 would lead to a flood of career criminals into the streets. They said that fewer than 3,000 inmates statewide were eligible to petition for resentencing, and that many of these had already served long sentences, making them older and less likely to return to crime (which is committed primarily by younger people).

Supporters noted the proposition could save California more than $100 million per year in prison costs and reduce overcrowding of prisons. Major supporters included District Attorneys Steve Cooley, George Gascon and Jeffrey F Rosen, Mike Romano, the NAACP, and the Democratic Party.

=== Opposition ===
Opponents of Prop 36 argued that the Three Strikes Law was widely popular at its passage, was successful in keeping dangerous criminals off the streets, and reduced crime rates in the past two decades. (Note: This link has not been proved by studies.) They dismissed claims that its passage would reduce overcrowding, noting that those inmates serving 25-life under Three Strikes Law made up 6.6 percent of the prison population, while those serving a life sentence with a third non-serious, non-violent felony comprise only 3.5 percent of the entire population. Opponents contended that Proposition 36 creates a "one size fits all" approach that strips judges of their discretion in Three Strikes cases. They said that savings of money should not be at the expense of public safety or the state's commitment to being tough on crime. The opposition said that Prop 36 was unnecessary, as the original bill had safeguards that allowed individual judges to assign sentences in accordance with each criminal's background and local standards. Major opponents includes Mike Reynolds, who drafted the Three Strikes Law, Keith Royal, and the Republican Party.

== Passage ==
The proposition was passed on November 6, 2012, with 8,575,619 people (69.3%) voting Yes and 3,798,218 people (30.7%) voting No. It passed by a majority in all counties of the state. It was most strongly supported in San Francisco (84.5%), Marin (83.2%), and Alameda (78.6%) counties. Madera county passed it with a slight majority of 52%.

== Implementation ==
Due to its relatively recent passage, a thorough analysis of its implementation and effects has yet to be conducted. However, Stanford Law Three Strikes Project at Stanford Law School and the NAACP Legal Defense and Education Fund compiled a preliminary report of the progress of Proposition 36 in October 2013. The report said that more than 1,000 prisoners had been released as a direct result of Three Strikes reform. The report also found that Proposition had already saved California $10–13 million, and projected up to $1 billion in savings in the next ten years. The report found the recidivism rate of released third strikers to be 2%, a rate dramatically lower than the statewide average of 16% of past inmates committing new crimes within 90 days of release. More than 2,000 additional inmates were awaiting resentencing review. The urgency with which county courts have reviewed these petitions has varied widely: San Bernardino has reviewed 73% of eligible petitions and Los Angeles has completed review of 19%. Of the petitions filed, 66% are pending, 32% have been granted, and 2% have been denied. The very low denial rate of release suggests that judges and prosecutors have concluded that a majority of the third strikers qualifying for review under Proposition 36 do not pose a threat to society.

That portion of Proposition 36 relating to sentencing of current repeat felons convicted of a nonviolent, non-serious third felony has been implemented statewide. Such individuals have been sentenced to twice the length of a sentence of a criminal convicted of that crime as a first offense.

=== Problems of implementation ===
Halfway through the two-year period allotted for court review of inmate petitions, more than two-thirds of such petitions have yet to be reviewed. The inconsistencies of implementation of Proposition 36 related to currently imprisoned populations is also problematic. The report also stresses the difficulties faced by released Third Strikers in re-entry to society. Unlike all other prisoners released from California jails, they are ineligible for state and county support, jobs, housing, and drug treatment. Some inmates have been released without warning to their families or authorities, and without qualifying for parole, probation, or any other form of state-sponsored assistance in returning to society.

Other critics contend that inadequate prosecutorial resources and attorney's intent upon denying or delaying resentencing to eligible inmates are also serious impediments to full implementation.
