= 2008 California Proposition 7 =

California Proposition 7, would have required California utilities to procure half of their power from renewable resources by 2025. In order to make that goal, levels of production of solar, wind and other renewable energy resources would more than quadruple from their current output of 10.9%. It would also require California utilities to increase their purchase of electricity generated from renewable resources by 2% annually to meet Renewable Portfolio Standard (RPS) requirements of 40% in 2020 and 50% in 2025. Current law AB32 requires an RPS of 20% by 2010.

The 42 page measure, 7 pages of which is new law, is an initiated state statute that had qualified for the November 2008 ballot in California, and was disapproved by voters on November 4 of that year.

== Provisions in the initiative ==
- All electric utilities (including municipally owned utilities) will be required to provide half of their electricity from solar and clean energy facilities by 2025. Current law requires the state’s investor-owned utilities (Edison and PG&E, for example) to reach 20 percent renewable energy by 2010.
- The California Energy Commission will be required to identify solar and clean energy zones, primarily in the desert, to jump-start clean power plants.
- Renewable plant construction permits would be fast-tracked for approval by the California Energy Commission once all environmental reviews are in place. Fast-tracking would limit the period for local comments and participation to 100 days.
- Penalties levied on utilities for specific acts of non-compliance would be reduced from 5% to 1%, but the total cap on fines that can be imposed on a utility would be eliminated.
- The California Energy Commission (CEC) will have the authority and responsibility to allocate funds from these penalties into the construction and implementation of new and existing transmission lines to provide access for renewable energy to the grid.
- Utilities will be prohibited from passing along penalties to their electric rate-payers.
- Caps price impacts on consumer's electricity bills at less than 3 percent. However, the non-partisan California Legislative Analyst's Office states that “the measure includes no specific provisions to implement or enforce this declaration”.
- Renewable energy sources include solar thermal, photovoltaic, wind, geothermal, small hydro, biomass, and tidal, etc., as provided for in current law Public Resources Code section 25741.
- Utilities entering into contracts with alternative fuel providers will be required to sign 20-year contracts.

=== Estimated fiscal impact ===
The California Legislative Analyst's Office, the nonpartisan state agency charged with providing a neutral estimate about the fiscal impact on the state of ballot initiatives and state legislative bills, has arrived at the following summary of Prop. 7's estimated costs:

- Increased state administrative costs of up to $3.4 million annually for the regulatory activities of the California Energy Resources Conservation and Development Commission and the California Public Utilities Commission, paid for by fee revenues.
- Unknown impact on state and local government costs and revenues due to the measure’s uncertain impact on retail electricity rates. In the short term, the prospects for higher rates - and therefore higher costs, lower sales and income tax revenues, and higher local utility tax revenues - are more likely. In the long term, the impact on electricity rates, and therefore state and local government costs and revenues, is unknown.

== Supporters ==
The official committee supporting Prop 7 is called Californians for Solar and Clean Energy.

- Dr. Donald Aitken
- David Freeman - energy policy advisor to Presidents John Kennedy and Lyndon Johnson.
- The Community Environmental Council of Santa Barbara
- Alice Wang (Vice-chair of the California Democratic Party)
- Christine Pelosi, former Executive Director of the Democratic Party
- Dolores Huerta, co-founder of the United Farm Workers Union

For the full list of supporters, see: List of Proposition 7 supporters

=== Arguments made in favor of Prop. 7 ===
- Three Nobel Prize–winning scientists have said that Proposition 7 provides powerful and necessary tools to reach the goals of 50% renewable energy by 2025.
- It would make California the world leader in clean power technology.
- It would help create over 370,000 new high wage jobs.
- It meets environmental protection standards as outlined in the Warren-Alquist Act and Desert Protection Act.
- Will have no negative impact on small-scale renewables and will likely benefit small-scale renewables
- Does not limit projects to those over 30 megawatts
- Provides a "feed-in tariff" for any size project, under which utilities must buy power offered by renewable energy companies that is cost-effective
- Strengthens penalties for utility non-compliance by eliminating the current cap on penalties imposed by the Public Utilities Commission

=== Donors who support Prop. 7 ===
The primary financial backer of the initiative is Peter Sperling.

As of September 18, two donors have contributed $5,000 or more to support Prop. 7. They are:

- Peter Sperling. $5,250,000.
- Jim Gonzalez & Associates. $101,500.

=== Campaign consultants ===
Jim Gonzalez, founding partner of the political consulting firm Jim Gonzalez & Associates in Sacramento, is the initiative's chief spokesperson.

== Opponents ==
The official committee opposing Prop. 7 is called Californians Against Another Costly Energy Scheme.

- Pacific Gas and Electric Company
- Edison Electric
- Sempra Electric
- The California Democratic Party
- The California Republican Party
- The California Labor Federation
- The California Taxpayers' Association
- The League of California Cities
- The California Solar Energy Industries Association
- The Sierra Club of California
- The California League of Conservation Voters
- The Natural Resources Defense Council
- The Union of Concerned Scientists

See also: List of Proposition 7 opponents.

=== Arguments made against Prop. 7 ===
- The measure is poorly written and so complicated that it could hurt the cause of renewable energy in the state.
- It will force small wind and solar companies out of the market because it excludes small renewable plants smaller than 30 MW from counting towards new requirements.
- It will guarantee that electricity consumers will pay 10% above market rates for renewable power forever, even when the costs of solar and wind sources become more competitive.
- It requires a two-thirds vote of the Legislature to change it."
- It would automatically lead us to litigation."

=== Donors who oppose Prop. 7 ===
As of August 2, three donors are listed as having given $5,000 or more to defeat this initiative. They are:

- PG&E, $13,720,250
- Edison, $13,720,250
- Sempra, $104,000,

=== Campaign consultants ===
The opposition coalition as of July 14, 2008 had paid about $175,000 to the campaign consulting firm of Townsend, Raimundo, Besler & Usher.

== Polling information ==
A poll released on July 22, 2008 by Field Poll showed Proposition 7 with 63% support and 24% opposition. 82% of those surveyed had no initial awareness of Proposition 7.

Month of Poll	In Favor	Opposed	Undecided
July 2008	63 percent	24 percent	13 percent

== Newspapers Opposed to Proposition 7 ==
- The Imperial Valley Press
- The Riverside Press-Enterprise
- The San Diego Union-Tribune
- The San Jose Mercury News
- The Santa Cruz Sentinel
- The Los Angeles Times
- The Santa Rosa Press Democrat

== Path to the ballot ==
The petition drive to qualify the measure for the ballot was conducted by Progressive Campaigns, Inc. at a cost of $1.367 million.

== Lawsuits over ballot language ==
Supporters and opponents of Proposition 7 filed lawsuits in Sacramento Superior Court regarding the wording of ballot arguments that voters will see in the official voter's guide.

The lawsuit filed by proponents of Proposition 7 claimed that the opposition’s ballot arguments contained false and misleading statements that should have been deleted. Specifically, proponents sued over the opponents' claim that small renewable providers would be shut out of the market. Noting that there is no language in the measure that states that, Sacramento County Superior Court Judge Michael Kenny refused to take sides on the issue.

The lawsuit filed by opponents of Proposition 7 wanted the removal of three statements in the voter's guide:

- Prop 7 will help create over 370,000 new prevailing wage jobs
- Prop 7 prohibits the utilities from passing on their penalty costs to consumers if they fail to meet renewable energy standards
- Prop 7 is guaranteed to never add more than 3% per year to consumer electricity bills

The opponent's petition was denied in its entirety, with Judge Kenny stating that the opponents had not sufficiently established that those statements were misleading.

== Results ==
Electoral results by county.

Proposition 7
Choice	Votes	%
For	4,502,235	35.57
Against	8,155,181	64.43
Total	12,657,416	100.00
Valid votes	12,657,416	92.10
Invalid/blank votes	1,085,761	7.90
Total votes	13,743,177	100.00
Registered voters/turnout		79.42

=== Basic information ===
- California Voter's Guide for Proposition 7
- Text of initiative as scanned images
- Text of initiative as PDF
- Text of initiative as plain text
- Arguments in favor of 7, proposed for official ballot book.
- California Voter Online guide to Proposition 7
- Smart Voter Guide to Proposition 7
- Arguments against 7, proposed for official ballot book.
- CaliforniaPropositions.org Prop 7 information page

=== Supporters ===
- Yes on Prop 7, website of supporters.
- Solar & Clean Energy Initiative campaign committee Details of income and expenditures
- Supporter funding sources

=== Opponents ===
- No on Prop 7, website of opponents.
- Opponent funding sources
