= 1911 California Proposition 8 =

Referendum allowing the recall of public officials

Proposition 8 of 1911 (or Senate Constitutional Amendment No. 23) was an amendment of the Constitution of California that introduced, for the first time, the recall of public officials. This allows the governor, state senators and assemblymen, and other elected officials to be removed from office early by a public vote. It was approved by voters in a referendum held as part of a special election on 10 October. On the same day voters approved two other major political reforms, Proposition 4, which granted women the vote, and Proposition 7, which introduced the initiative and the optional referendum.

Proposition 8 added Article 23 of the Constitution of California. This began: "Every elective public officer of the State of California may be removed from office at any time by the electors entitled to vote for a successor of such incumbent". Article 23 has since been repealed, but today a modified version of the recall procedure is contained in Article 2.

This measure was used to successfully recall Governor Gray Davis in 2003 and unsuccessfully used in an attempt to recall Governor Gavin Newsom in 2021.

== Full text of the proposition and amendment ==
Source: Charles A. Beard and Birl E. Shultz (eds.), Documents on the State-wide Initiative, Referendum & Recall (New York: The Macmillan Company, 1912), 264-270.

Senate Constitutional Amendment No. 23. A resolution to propose to the people of the State of California an amendment to the constitution of the state by adding a new article thereto to be numbered Article XXIII, providing for the recall by the electors, of public officials.
The legislature of the State of California, at its regular session commencing on the second day of January, 1911, two-thirds of all the members elected to each of the two houses of said legislature voting in favor thereof, hereby proposes that a new article be added to the constitution of the State of California to be numbered Article XXIII thereof, to read as follows:—

=== Article XXIII ===
Section 1. Every elective public officer of the State of California may be removed from office at any time by the electors entitled to vote for a successor of such incumbent, through the procedure and in the manner herein provided for, which procedure shall be known as the recall, and is in addition to any other method of removal provided by law.
The procedure hereunder to effect the removal of an incumbent of an elective public office shall be as follows: A petition signed by electors entitled to vote for a successor of the incumbent sought to be removed, equal in number to at least twelve per cent of the entire vote cast at the last preceding election for all candidates for the office which the incumbent sought to be removed occupies; provided, that if the officer sought to be removed is a state officer who is elected in any political subdivision of the state, said petition shall be signed by electors entitled to vote for a successor to the incumbent sought to be removed, equal in number to at least twenty per cent of the entire vote cast at the last preceding election for all candidates for the office which the incumbent sought to be removed occupies, demanding an election of a successor to the officer named in said petition, shall be addressed to the secretary of state and filed with the clerk, or registrar of voters, of the county or city and county in which the petition was circulated; provided, that if the officer sought to be removed was elected in the state at large such petition shall be circulated in not less than five counties of the state, and shall be signed in each of such counties by electors equal in number to note less than one per cent of the entire vote cast, in each of said counties, at said election, as above estimated. Such petition shall contain a general statement of the ground on which the removal is sought, which statement is intended solely for the information of the electors, and the sufficiency of which shall not be open to review.
When such petition is certified as is herein provided to the secretary of state, he shall forthwith submit the said petition, together with a certificate of its sufficiency, to the governor, who shall thereupon order and fix a date for holding the election, not less than sixty days nor more than eighty days from the date of such certificate of the secretary of state.
The governor shall make or cause to be made publication of notice for the holding of such election, and officers charged by law with duties concerning elections shall make all arrangements for such election and the same shall be conducted, returned, and the result thereof declared, in all respects as are other state elections. On the official ballot at such election shall be printed, in not more than two hundred words, the reasons set forth in the petition for demanding his recall. And in not more than three hundred words there shall also be printed, if desired by him, the officer's justification of his course in office. Proceedings for the recall of any officer shall be deemed to be pending from the date of the filing with any county, or city and county clerk, or registrar of voters, of any recall petition against such officer; and if such officer shall resign at any time subsequent to the filing thereof, the recall election shall be held notwithstanding such resignation, and the vacancy caused by such resignation, or from any other cause, shall be filled as provided by law, but the person appointed to fill such vacancy shall hold his office only until the person elected at the said recall election shall qualify.
Any person may be nominated for the office which is to be filled at any recall election by a petition signed by electors, qualified to vote at such recall election, equal in number to at least one per cent of the total number of votes cast at the last preceding election for all candidates for the office which the incumbent sought to be removed occupies. Each such nominating petition shall be filed with the secretary of state not less than twenty-five days before such recall election.
There shall be printed on the recall ballot, as to every officer whose recall is to be voted on thereat, the following question: "Shall (name of person against whom the recall petition is filed) be recalled from the office of (title of the office)?" following which question shall be the words "yes" and "no" on separate lines, with a blank space at the right of each, in which the voter shall indicate, by stamping a cross (X), his vote for or against such recall. On such ballots, under each such question, there shall also be printed the names of those persons who have been nominated as candidates to succeed the person recalled, in case he shall be removed from office by said recall election; but no vote cast shall be counted for any candidate for said office unless the voter also voted on said question of the recall of the person sought to be recalled from said office. The name of the person against whom the petition is filed shall not appear on the ballot as a candidate for office. If a majority of those voting on said question of the recall of any incumbent from office shall vote "No," said incumbent shall continue in said office. If a majority shall vote "Yes," said incumbent shall thereupon be deemed removed from such office, upon the qualification of his successor. The canvassers shall canvass all votes for candidates for said office and declare the result in like manner as in a regular election. If the vote at any such recall election shall recall the officer, then the candidate who has received the highest number of votes shall be thereby declared elected, for the remainder of the term. In case the person who received the highest number of votes for the office shall fail to qualify within ten days after receiving the certificate of election, the office shall be deemed vacant and shall be filled according to law.
Any recall petition may be presented in sections, but each section shall contain a full and accurate copy of the title and text of the petition. Each signer shall add to his signature his place of residence, giving the street and number, if such exist. His election precinct shall also appear on the paper after his name. The number of signatures appended to each section shall be at the pleasure of the person soliciting signatures to the same. Any qualified elector of the state shall be competent to solicit such signatures within the county, or city and county, of which he is an elector. Each section of the petition shall bear the name of the county, or city and county in which it is circulated, and only qualified electors of such county or city and county shall be competent to sign such section. Each section shall have attached thereto the affidavit of the person soliciting signatures to the same stating his qualifications and that all the signatures to the attached section were made in his presence and that to the best of his knowledge and belief each signature to the section is the genuine signature of the person whose name it purports to be; and no other affidavit thereto shall be required. The affidavit of any person soliciting signatures hereunder shall be verified free of charge by any officer authorized to administer an oath. Such petition so verified shall be prima facie evidence that the signatures thereto appended are genuine and that the persons signing the same are qualified electors. Unless and until it is otherwise proven upon official investigation, it shall be presumed that the petition presented contains the signatures of the requisite number of electors. Each section of the petition shall be filed with the clerk, or registrar of voters, of the county or city and county in which it was circulated; but all such sections circulated in any county or city and county shall be filed at the same time. Within twenty days after the date of filing such petition, the clerk, or registrar of voters, shall finally determine from the records of registration what number of qualified electors have signed the same; and, if necessary, the board of supervisors shall allow such clerk or registrar additional assistants for the purpose of examining such petition and provide for their compensation. The said clerk or registrar, upon the completion of such examination, shall forthwith attach to such petition his certificate, properly dated, showing the result of such examination, and submit said petition, except as to the signatures appended thereto, to the secretary of state and file a copy of said certificate in his office. Within forty days from the transmission of said petition and certificate by the clerk or registrar of voters to the secretary of state, a supplemental petition, identical with the original as to the body of the petition but containing supplemental names, may be filed with the clerk or registrar of voters, as aforesaid. The clerk or registrar of voters shall within ten days after the filing of such supplemental petition make like examination thereof as of the original petition, and upon the conclusion of such examination shall forthwith attach to such petition his certificate, properly dated, showing the result of such examination, and shall forthwith transmit such supplemental petition, except as to the signatures thereon, together with his said certificate, to the secretary of state.
When the secretary of state shall have received from one or more county clerks, or registrars of voters, a petition certified as herein provided to have been signed by the requisite number of qualified electors, he shall forthwith transmit to the county clerk or registrar of voters of every county or city and county in the state a certificate showing such fact; and such clerk or registrar of voters shall thereupon file said certificate for record in his office.
A petition shall be deemed to be filed with the secretary of state upon the date of the receipt by him of a certificate or certificates showing the said petition to be signed by the requisite number of electors of the state.
No recall petition shall be circulated or filed against any officer until he has actually held his office for at least six months; save and except it may be filed against any member of the state legislature at any time after five days from the convening and organizing of the legislature after his election.
If at any recall election the incumbent whose removal is sought is not recalled, he shall be repaid from the state treasury any amount legally expended by him as expenses of such election, and the legislature shall provide an appropriation for such purpose, and no proceedings for another recall election of the said incumbent shall be initiated within six months after such election.
If the governor is sought to be removed under the provisions of this article, the duties herein imposed upon him shall be performed by the lieutenant governor; and if the secretary of state is sought to be removed, the duties herein imposed upon him shall be performed by the state controller; and the duties herein imposed upon the clerk or registrar of voters, shall be performed by such registrar of voters in all cases where the office of registrar of voters exists.
The recall shall also be exercised by the electors of each county, city and county, city and town of the state, with reference to the elective officers thereof, under such procedure as shall be provided by law.
Until otherwise provided by law, the legislative body of any such county, city and county, city or town may provide for the manner of exercising such recall powers in such counties, cities and counties, cities and towns, but shall not require any such recall petition to be signed by electors more in number than twenty-five per cent of the entire vote cast at the last preceding election for all candidates for the office which the incumbent sought to be removed occupies. Nothing herein contained shall be construed as affecting or limiting the present or future powers of cities or counties or cities and counties having charters adopted under the authority given by the constitution.
In the submission to the electors of any petition proposed under this article all officers shall be guided by the general laws of the state, except as otherwise herein provided.
This article is self-executing, but legislation may be eneacted to facilitate its operation, but in no way limiting or restricting the provisions of this article or the powers herein reserved.

== See also ==
- Recall election § California
