= 1972 California Proposition 11 =

Proposition 11, sometimes known as the "Privacy Initiative" or the "Right to Privacy Initiative", was a ballot initiative to amend the constitution of the state of California to include privacy as an inalienable right to citizens in "Article 1: Declaration of Rights" of the constitution.

== Overview ==
The Proposition was co-authored by California State Assemblyman Kenneth Cory (D-Garden Grove) and California State Senator George Moscone (D-San Francisco) as a protective measure against government agencies collecting personal information from citizens. Assemblyman Cory also expressed specific concern for privacy due to the potential threat that new technology had on compromising privacy. Opponents of the measure argued that such an initiative was unnecessary since the courts and State Legislature already had the power to address issues of privacy.

On November 7, 1972, the proposition overwhelmingly passed and consequently resulted in explicit references to privacy in the California State Constitution.

Subsequently, Supreme Court of California decisions have used this enumerated right to grant additional rights beyond those of the California Constitution. Abortion restrictions and occupancy rules that required blood relations for residents in single family zoned homes were struck down under Proposition 11's guarantee to privacy, as well as discovery regarding a sexual harassment victim's sexual history and drug tests of college athletes.
