= 1911 California Proposition 7 =

Referendum on referendums

Proposition 7 of 1911 (or Senate Constitutional Amendment No. 22) was an amendment of the Constitution of California that introduced, for the first time, the initiative and the optional referendum. Prior to 1911 the only form of direct democracy in California was the compulsory referendum.

Since the first state constitution was enacted in 1849, it has been obligatory for constitutional amendments and certain other measures to be approved by voters in a referendum in order to become law. Proposition 7 introduced a form of optional (or facultative) referendum on ordinary statutes. This means that a proposed law passed by the state legislature must be put before the electorate if a specific number of voters sign a petition requesting a referendum. The amendment also introduced the more powerful initiative procedure. This means that a certain number of voters can propose an entirely new statute or constitutional amendment, which then must be put to a vote of the people.

Proposition 7 was part of the Progressive Era of reforms. On the same day voters approved Proposition 4, which granted women the vote, and Proposition 8, which introduced another instrument of direct democracy, the recall of elected representatives.

== Provisions ==
Proposition 7 was approved by the California Legislature on 20 February 1911. It was ratified by voters in a referendum held as part of a special election on 10 October. The amendment altered the state constitution by rewriting and adding a long set of provisions to Article 4, Section 1, which dealt with the legislature. As amended, the section began,

The legislative power of this state shall be vested in a senate and assembly which shall be designated "The legislature of the State of California," but the people reserve to themselves the power to propose laws and amendments to the constitution, and to adopt or reject the same, at the polls independent of the legislature, and also reserve the power, at their own option, to so adopt or reject any act, or section or part of any act, passed by the legislature.

It continued, "the first power reserved to the people shall be known as the initiative" and "the second power reserved to the people shall be known as the referendum". The provisions on direct democracy have since been moved, and reworded somewhat. Today they are contained in Article 2.

== See also ==
- California ballot proposition (the initiative and referendum in California)
