= 1978 California Proposition 7 =

Referendum on the death penalty

California Proposition 7, or the Death Penalty Act, is a ballot proposition approved in California by statewide ballot on November 7, 1978. Proposition 7 increased the penalties for first degree murder and second degree murder, expanded the list of special circumstances requiring a death sentence or life imprisonment without the possibility of parole, and revised existing law relating to mitigating or aggravating circumstances.

== Background ==
Conservative politician John V. Briggs recruited attorney Donald J. Heller to draft the proposal. The official ballot title and summary of the ballot measure prepared by the California Attorney General read:

Murder. Penalty. Initiative Statute.
Changes and expands categories of first degree murder for which penalties of death or confinement without possibility of parole may be imposed. Changes minimum sentence for first degree murder from life to 25 years to life. Increases penalty for second degree murder. Prohibits parole of convicted murderers before service of 25 or 15 year terms, subject to good-time credit. During punishment stage of cases in which death penalty is authorized: permits consideration of all felony convictions of defendant; requires court to impanel new jury if first jury is unable to reach a unanimous verdict on punishment. Financial impact: Indeterminable future increase in state costs."

== Election results ==
- Yes: 4,480,275 (71.1%)
- No: 1,818,357 (28.9%)

== Impact ==
Since its creation until the end of 2011, the law had resulted in 13 executions and cost taxpayers $4 billion, according to a study co-authored by Loyola Law School professor Paula Mitchell. Mitchell and U.S. 9th Circuit Court of Appeals Judge Arthur Alarcón estimated California was spending $184 million a year on lawyers, expert witnesses and secure prisons associated with the death row population created by Proposition 7. Ron Briggs, son of John Briggs, joined Heller and others in seeking to repeal Proposition 7, including Jeanne Woodford, a former warden at San Quentin State Prison, and former Los Angeles district attorney Gil Garcetti. Arguments for repeal have focused on the costs and the ethics of the death penalty.
