= 1996 California elections =

- November 5, 1996
- Registered: 15,662,075
- Turnout: 65.53% (▲5.08 pp)

Elections were held in California on November 5, 1996. Primary elections were held on March 26, 1996. Up for election were all 80 seats of the State Assembly, 20 of the 40 seats of the State Senate, all 52 House seats, the presidential election, and 15 statewide ballot measures.

== House of Representatives ==
The delegation went from being tied to slightly majority-Democratic, with Democrats gaining 3 seats.

United States House of Representatives elections in California, 1996
Party	Votes	%	Before	After	+/–
Democratic	4,706,278	49.61%	26	29	+3
Republican	4,292,128	45.25%	26	23	-3
Libertarian	213,583	2.25%	0	0	0
Natural Law	131,023	1.38%	0	0	0
Reform	57,513	0.61%	0	0	0
Peace and Freedom	48,136	0.51%	0	0	0
American Independent	17,814	0.19%	0	0	0
Independent	9,845	0.10%	0	0	0
Green	8,805	0.09%	0	0	0
Write-ins	541	0.01%	0	0	0
Invalid or blank votes	780,588	7.60%	—	—	—
Totals	10,266,254	100.00%	52	52	—

== California Legislature elections ==
=== State Senate ===
There are 40 seats in the State Senate. For this election, candidates running in odd-numbered districts ran for four-year terms. The Democrats retained control of the State Senate.

California State Senate - 1996	Seats
Democratic-Held	22
Republican-Held	16
Independent-Held	1
1996 Elections
Democratic Held and Uncontested	10
Contested	20
Republican Held and Uncontested	10
Total	40

=== State Assembly ===
All 80 biennially elected seats of the State Assembly were up for election this year. Each seat has a two-year term. The Democrats won control of the State Assembly, which they had lost two years prior.

California State Assembly - 1996	Seats
Democratic-Held	43
Republican-Held	37
1996 Elections
Democratic Incumbent and Uncontested	19
Republican Incumbent and Uncontested	29
Contested, Open Seats	32
Total	80

== Statewide ballot propositions ==
Fifteen (15) ballot propositions qualified to be listed on the general election ballot in California. Eight measures passed while seven failed.

=== Proposition 204 ===
(Safe, Clean, Reliable Water Supply Act.) Proposition 204 passed with 62.84% of the vote.

Proposition 204 results by county Yes: 70–80%; 60–70%; 50–60%; No: 60–70%; 50–60%

=== Proposition 205 ===
(Youthful and Adult Offender Local Facilities Bond Act of 1996.) Proposition 205 failed with 40.62% of the vote.

Proposition 205 results by county No: 70–80%; 60–70%; 50–60%; Yes: 50–60%

=== Proposition 206 ===
(Veterans' Bond Act of 1996.) Proposition 206 passed with 53.56% of the vote.

Proposition 206 results by county Yes: 50–60%; No: 50–60%

=== Proposition 207 ===
(Attorneys. Fees. Right to Negotiate. Frivolous Lawsuits.) Proposition 207 failed with 34.22% of the vote.

Proposition 207 results by county No: 70–80%; 60–70%; 50–60%

=== Proposition 208 ===
(Campaign Contributions and Spending Limits. Restricts Lobbyists.) Proposition 208 passed with 61.27% of the vote.

Proposition 208 results by county Yes: 70–80%; 60–70%; 50–60%

=== Proposition 209 ===
(Prohibition Against Discrimination or Preferential Treatment by State and Other Public Entities.) Proposition 209 passed with 54.55% of the vote.

Proposition 209 results by county Yes: 70–80%; 60–70%; 50–60%; No: 70–80%; 60–70%; 50–60%

=== Proposition 210 ===
(Minimum Wage Increase.) Proposition 210 passed with 61.45% of the vote.

Proposition 210 results by county Yes: 70–80%; 60–70%; 50–60%; No: 50–60%

=== Proposition 211 ===
(Attorney-Client Fee Arrangements. Securities Fraud. Lawsuits.) Proposition 211 failed with 25.65% of the vote.

Proposition 211 results by county No: 80–90%; 70–80%; 60–70%

=== Proposition 212 ===
(Campaign Contributions and Spending Limits. Repeals Gift and Honoraria Limits. Restricts Lobbyists.) Proposition 212 failed with 49.16% of the vote.

Proposition 212 results by county No: 50–60%; Yes: 50–60%

=== Proposition 213 ===
(Limitation on Recovery to Felons, Uninsured Motorists, Drunk Drivers.) Proposition 213 passed with 76.83% of the vote.

Proposition 213 results by county Yes: 80–90%; 70–80%; 60–70%; 50–60%

=== Proposition 214 ===
(Health Care. Consumer Protection. Initiative Statute.) Proposition 214 failed with 42.04% of the vote.

Proposition 214 results by county No: 70–80%; 60–70%; 50–60%; Yes: 60–70%

=== Proposition 215 ===
(Medical Use of Marijuana.) Proposition 215 passed with 55.58% of the vote.

Proposition 215 results by county Yes: 70–80%; 60–70%; 50–60%; No: 60–70%; 50–60%

=== Proposition 216 ===
(Health Care. Consumer Protection. Taxes on Corporate Restructuring.) Proposition 216 failed with 38.76% of the vote.

Proposition 216 results by county No: 70–80%; 60–70%; 50–60%; Yes: 50–60%

=== Proposition 217 ===
(Top Income Tax Brackets. Reinstatement. Revenues to Local Agencies.) Proposition 217 failed with 49.20% of the vote.

Proposition 217 results by county No: 60–70%; 50–60%; Yes: 60–70%; 50–60%

=== Proposition 218 ===
(Voter Approval for Local Government Taxes. Limitations on Fees, Assessments, and Charges.) Proposition 218 passed with 56.55% of the vote.

Proposition 218 results by county Yes: 70–80%; 60–70%; 50–60%; No: 60–70%; 50–60%

== See also ==
- California State Legislature
- California State Assembly
- California State Assembly elections, 1996
- California State Senate
- California State Senate elections, 1996
- Districts in California
- Political party strength in U.S. states
- Political party strength in California
- Elections in California
- California Proposition 209
- California Proposition 215
- California Proposition 218
- California Proposition 218 Local Initiative Power
