= Taxation in California =

Overview of taxation in the U.S. state of California

Taxes in California are collected by state and local governments through a number of tax categories. In total, for fiscal year 2022, California state and local governments together collected an average of $10,319 per capita from residents, the third highest per capita collections in the nation, with the nationwide average being $7,109. California does not have an estate tax or inheritance tax.

Sales tax: As of 2024, a 7.25% state sales tax is imposed on the sale of tangible goods. Unprepared food purchased in grocery stores, soap, medical devices, diapers, and feminine hygiene products are all excluded from sales tax. Local taxes are legislatively capped at an additional 2%, though because over 140 jurisdictions have exemptions to this cap, some cities have a sales tax as high as 11.25%. The average combined state and local sales tax rate is 8.85 percent. Use tax is imposed on the storage, use, or other consumption of tangible personal property purchased from a retailer.

Property tax: Property tax is imposed at a uniform 1% rate of assessed value with annual increases of assessed value restricted to an inflation factor, not to exceed 2% per year due to California's Proposition 13. It prohibits reassessment of a new base year value except in cases of (a) change in ownership, or (b) completion of new construction. People 55 or older can benefit from exemptions. Prop 13 applies equally to all real estate, residential and commercial—whether owned by individuals or corporations. For 2023, the effective property tax rate on owner-occupied housing value was 0.7%.

Income tax: California has a progressive personal income tax system, with rates which range from 1% to 13.3%. The 13.3% rate is the highest in the country, and applies to income over $1 million. Due to this progressivity the state's income tax collections are extremely dependent on high income earners; the top 10% of earners pay 75% of the state's total income tax revenue, (with the top 1% paying 33% and the top 0.1% paying 17%), while the bottom 90% of income earners pay 25%. California's corporate income tax is a flat tax with a rate of 8.84%. Banks and financial institutions are subject to a slightly higher rate of 10.84%.

Other taxes: The state also imposes payroll taxes for unemployment insurance, as well as the state's own disability insurance system. Gasoline is taxed at $0.71 / gallon (in 2025), and the cigarette excise tax is $2.87 / pack.

== Revenue from taxes ==
2020-2024 California State Tax Collections (in billions)
	2020	2021	2022	2023	2024
Property Taxes	$3.1	$3.4	$3.0	$3.4	$3.6
Sales and Gross Receipts Taxes	$63.6	$64.4	$71.7	$72.5	$74.1
License Taxes	$12.0	$13.6	$13.4	$13.3	$15.0
Income Taxes	$94.2	$172.4	$192.2	$126.3	$164.5
Other Taxes	$0.1	$1.3	$2.6	$2.2	$8.4
TOTAL	$173.0	$254.8	$282.9	$217.7	$265.6

== Tax burden ==
The state and local tax burden in 2022, which is the state and local taxes paid by a state's residents divided by that state's share of net national product, was 13.5% for California (11.2% national average), 5th highest in the nation. California has had the 4th or 5th highest tax burden by this metric from 2019 to 2022.

However, breaking out the tax burden by income brackets reveals a different story. The lowest 20% bracket of family income paid an effective tax rate of 11.7% in California compared to the national average of 11.4%, and large states like Texas (12.8%) and Florida (13.2%). The next 20% income bracket of family income paid an effective tax rate of 10.3% in California compared to the national average of 10.4%, and Texas (11.2%) and Florida (10.9%). According to the Institute on Taxation and Economic Policy, in 2024 California had the 5th least regressive state and local tax system, after D.C., Minnesota, Vermont, and New York.

== Sales tax ==
Sales and use taxes in California (state and local) are collected by the California Department of Tax and Fee Administration, whereas income and franchise taxes are collected by the Franchise Tax Board.

At 7.25%, California has the highest minimum statewide sales tax rate in the United States.

Groceries, diapers, soap, medical devices, feminine hygiene products are all excluded from the California sales taxes.

The statewide base sales tax rate of 7.25% is allocated as follows:

- 7.25% – State + Local
  - 6.00% – State
    - 3.9375% – State – General Fund
    - 0.50% – State – Local Public Safety Fund
    - 0.50% – State – Local Revenue Fund for local health and social services
    - 1.0625% – State – Local Revenue Fund (2011)
  - 1.25% – Uniform Local Tax
    - 0.25% – Local County – Transportation funds
    - 1.00% – Local City/County – Operational funds

The statewide sales tax in California was first imposed on August 1, 1933, at the rate of 2.50% under the "Retail Sales Act of 1933." No local sales taxes were levied at that time. In an editorial dated September 5, 1933, the Los Angeles Times had criticized the 2.50% sales tax rate in stating that the "sales-tax rate should not have exceeded 1 per cent" and that the tax rate was "so high as to discourage business, which will make the tax less productive."

=== Local sales taxes ===
Supplementary local sales taxes may be added by cities, counties, service authorities, and various special districts. Local county sales taxes for transportation purposes are especially popular in California. Additional local sales taxes levied by counties and municipalities are formally called "District Taxes."

The effect from local sales taxes is that sales tax rates vary in California from 7.25% (in areas where no additional local sales taxes are levied) to 11.25% (two cities located in Los Angeles County).

For example, the city of Sacramento, the state capital, has a combined 8.75% sales tax rate, and Los Angeles, the largest city in California, has a combined 9.50% sales tax rate.

As of July 1, 2022, 62 local jurisdictions levy no additional local sales tax, while 6 cities (all located in Alameda County) have the highest combined sales tax rate in California at 10.75%.

==== Local sales tax rate cap ====
The combined tax rate of all local sales taxes in any county is generally not allowed to exceed 2.00 percent. However, this is a statutory restriction and the California Legislature routinely allows some local governments, through the adoption of separate legislation, to exceed the 2.00 percent local tax rate cap. The 2.00 percent local tax rate cap is exceeded in any city with a combined sales tax rate in excess of 9.25% (7.25% statewide tax rate plus the 2.00% tax rate cap).

As of July 1, 2022, 140 California local jurisdictions have a combined sales tax rate in excess of the 2.00 percent local tax rate cap:

==== SB 566 (2003) and the rise in local sales tax increases ====
The number of local sales taxes greatly increased following the passage of SB 566 in 2003. SB 566 legally authorized all California cities to levy additional local sales taxes. SB 566 also increased the maximum combined local sales tax rate (local sales tax rate cap) that can be levied by local governments from 1.50% to the current 2.00%.

As of April 1, 2017, 176 cities and 32 counties have approved local sales tax increases. Not only has the number of local city sales taxes greatly increased since the passage of SB 566, but the magnitude of the sales tax increases (as measured by the sales tax rate increase) has also significantly increased as more cities are seeking larger sales tax rate increases.

=== Local sales taxes subject to voter approval under Proposition 218 ===
All local sales taxes are subject to voter approval under Proposition 218 ("Right to Vote on Taxes Act") which California voters approved in November 1996. Whether simple majority voter approval or two-thirds voter approval is required depends upon the type of sales tax levied and the type of local government imposing the sales tax.

Unrestricted general sales taxes are subject to majority vote approval by local voters. General sales taxes can be spent by local politicians for any general governmental purpose, including public employee salaries and benefits. General sales tax spending decisions are made after the tax election by local politicians as part of the regular annual local government budget process.

Special sales taxes dedicated for one or more specific purposes are subject to two-thirds voter approval by local voters. Any sales tax imposed by a local government other than a city or a county (e.g., a special district such as a local transportation agency) must be a special tax subject to two-thirds voter approval by local voters.

Proposition 218 does not legally authorize any local government to levy a sales tax. The legal authority to levy a local sales tax must come from a state statute. A two-thirds vote of all members of the legislative body of the local government is usually required before a local sales tax measure may be presented to voters at an election.

==== Relationship between sales tax increases and public employee costs ====
In 2016, the driving force behind many local sales tax increases is skyrocketing public pension costs and public employee retiree healthcare. Research has shown that local sales tax increases are concentrated in California localities that have the largest pension problems.

==== County transportation sales taxes ====
Countywide sales taxes for transportation purposes are very popular in California. However, transportation sales taxes are regressive and also shift the financial base of transportation systems from user fees to taxes paid by all taxpayers without regard to direct reliance on those transportation systems. Some counties have passed multiple transportation sales taxes increases such as Los Angeles County that has passed four transportation sales tax increases for a combined rate of 2.00%.

=== Local sales tax reduction or repeal using Proposition 218 ===
Proposition 218 ("Right to Vote on Taxes Act") was a 1996 initiative constitutional amendment approved by California voters. Proposition 218 includes a provision constitutionally reserving to local voters the right to use the initiative power to reduce or repeal any local tax, assessment, fee or charge, including provision for a significantly reduced petition signature requirement to qualify a measure on the ballot. A local sales tax, including a sales tax previously approved by local voters, is generally subject to reduction or repeal using the local initiative power under Proposition 218.

A local sales tax used to repay bonds is a legally more complex situation because federal contract impairment issues may preclude the exercise of the local initiative power under Proposition 218. Local voter-approved transportation sales taxes often include at least a portion of the tax proceeds to repay bonds. Advice from legal counsel is generally needed in situations where bonds have been issued and sales tax revenues have been pledged to repay the bonds. A local compensatory initiative under Proposition 218 is an alternative option when contract impairment problems are present.

=== Recent statewide sales tax increases ===
Recent temporary statewide sales tax increases include:

- From April 1, 2009 until June 30, 2011, the state sales and use tax increased by 1% from 7.25% to 8.25% as a result of the 2008-2009 California budget crisis.
- Effective January 1, 2013, the state sales and use tax increased by 0.25% from 7.25% to 7.50% as a result of Proposition 30 passed by California voters in the November 6, 2012 election. The change was a four-year temporary tax increase that expired on December 31, 2016.

=== Taxation of online sales ===
As of July 1, 2011, California applies sales tax to online retailer purchases. It is the retailer's responsibility to collect the state sales tax on all purchases made within (or shipped to) California regardless where the retailer/supplier is located. Businesses with multiple locations in the state may attribute all online sales taxes to a single jurisdiction, which had led to district-shopping for revenue-sharing deals with cities that return a portion of the collected sales tax to the business. In 2019, SB 531 was approved by the legislature to close this loophole, but was vetoed by Governor Gavin Newsom.

=== Exemptions ===
Occasional or one-time sales not part of a regular business are exempt, except that sales of three or more non-food animals (puppies, kittens, etc.) per year are taxed.

There are also exemptions for numerous specific products, from telephone lines and poles, to liquid petroleum gas for farm machinery, to coins, to public transit vehicles. There are partial exemptions for such varied items as racehorse breeding stock, teleproduction service equipment, farm machinery, and timber-harvesting equipment. For an organized list of exemptions, with estimates for how much revenue the state loses and the people saves for each, see Publication 61 of the Board of Equalization.

Sales tax is charged on gasoline. The tax is levied on both the gasoline and on the federal and state excise taxes, resulting in a form of "double taxation". The sales tax is included in the metered price at the pump. The California excise tax on gasoline as of mid-2011 is 35.7 cents per gallon for motor fuel plus a 2.25% sales and use tax, 13 cents per gallon for diesel plus a 9.12% sales and use tax.

The California Department of Tax and Fee Administration provides an online list of sales taxes in the local communities of the state.

=== Software electronically transmitted to customers ===
According to Regulation 1502, the sale of noncustom (canned) software to customers who download the software from a server is generally not subject to sales tax because the transaction does not involve tangible personal property. However, if the customer is provided a copy of the software on a physical storage medium such as a CD-ROM or a DVD, the entire transaction is generally subject to sales tax. Thus, a customer can generally avoid sales tax liability by purchasing a downloadable version of software instead of a physical version. While this exemption currently remains in place, legislative reforms (SB 122) establish sales and use tax applicability for SaaS and digital services beginning in 2027.

=== Debate ===
Critics of the current California sales tax system contend that it gives local governments an incentive to promote commercial development through zoning and other regulations (known as fiscalization of land use) over residential development, including the use of eminent domain condemnation proceedings to transfer real estate to higher sales tax generating businesses.

== Property tax ==
Property tax is imposed at a uniform 1% rate of assessed value with annual increases of assessed value restricted to an inflation factor, not to exceed 2% per year due to California's Proposition 13. It prohibits reassessment of a new base year value except in cases of (a) change in ownership, or (b) completion of new construction. People 55 or older can benefit from exemptions. Prop 13 applies equally to all real estate, residential and commercial—whether owned by individuals or corporations. For 2023, the effective property tax rate on owner-occupied housing value was 0.7%.

Because property prices have increased in California faster than 2.0%, on average, older properties are taxed at "effective" rates that are lower than newly sold properties.

== Income tax ==
California has a progressive income tax, with rates ranging from 1% to 12.3%.

The standard deduction is a dollar amount that people can subtract from their taxable income. This reduces their taxes. The standard deduction is $5,706 for individuals and $11,412 for couples.

For example, let's imagine a single California man with an income of $59,706.

His standard deduction is $5706.

- $59,706 - $5706 = $54,000

So his taxable income is $54,000.

- The first $10,412 would be taxed at 1%
- The next $10,412 to $24,684 would be taxed at 2%
- The next $25,499 to $40,245 would be taxed at 3%
- The next $40,245 to $54,000 would be taxed at 6%

Single Individuals
Standard deduction	$5,706
Taxable income	Rate
$0 - $10,756	1.00%
$10,756 - $25,499	2.00%
$25,499 - $40,245	4.00%
$40,245 - $55,866	6.00%
$55,866 - $70,606	8.00%
$70,606 - $360,659	9.30%
$360,659 - $432,787	10.30%
$432,787 - $721,314	11.30%
$721,314 - $1,000,000	12.30%
$1,000,000+	13.30%

There is an additional 1% tax (the California Mental Health Services Act tax) if one's taxable income is more than $1,000,000, which results in a top income tax rate of 13.3% in California which is the highest statewide income tax rate in the United States.

Due to this progressivity the state's income tax is highly dependent on high income earners; the top 10% of earners pay 75% of the state's total income tax revenue, (with the top 1% paying 33% and the top 0.1% paying 17%), while the bottom 90% of income earners pay 25%.

== Payroll taxes ==
=== Unemployment insurance ===
As of 2020, California charges between 3.4 (new employers) and 6.2 percent (maximum) in Unemployment Insurance (UI) Tax on the first $7,000 of wages in a year, paid by the employer. Employment Training Tax (ETT) is 0.1 percent, paid by some employers, on the first $7,000 of wages. State Disability Insurance (SDI) Tax is 1.20 percent.

=== Employment Training Tax ===
The Employment Training Tax (ETT) rate for 2014 is 0.1 percent on the first $7,000 per employee per calendar year.

=== State Disability Insurance ===
The State Disability Insurance (SDI) withholding rate for 2014 is 1.0 percent up to a salary limit of $101,636 income—maximum disability tax for each employee is $1,016.36.

== Gasoline tax ==
In 2025, California's gasoline tax was $0.71 per gallon.

== Excise taxes ==
=== Cigarette tax ===
As of 2025, the state charges an excise tax on cigarettes of $2.87 / pack of 20.

== See also ==
- California Proposition 218
- California Proposition 218 Local Initiative Power
