= Howard Jarvis Taxpayers Association =

American lobbying group

- Founded: 1978; 48 years ago
- Founder: Howard Jarvis
- Type: 501(c)(4)
- Tax ID no.: 95-4239620
- Purpose: 1978 California Proposition 13; 1996 California Proposition 218; Property tax Fiscal Conservatism
- Location(s): Sacramento, California, US; Los Angeles, California, US
- Region served: California
- Affiliations: Howard Jarvis Taxpayers Foundation
- Revenue: $5.9 million (2015)
- Expenses: $5.7 million (2015)
- Website: www.hjta.org
- Formerly called: California Tax Reduction Movement

The Howard Jarvis Taxpayers Association, priorly called the California Tax Reduction Movement, is a California-based nonprofit lobbying and policy organization that sponsored the landmark tax-limiting state constitutional amendments Proposition 13 and Proposition 218. The organization opposes raising taxes in California. It is a nonpartisan organization, meaning that it does not officially support any particular political party.

== Opposition to taxes ==
The Howard Jarvis Taxpayers Association is known for its opposition to taxes. It mobilizes its members to support or oppose legislation, including ballot initiatives. It also endorses candidates in California elections and, through its separate campaign committees, is a source of campaign funds for the elections of candidates and ballot measures in California.

It was a driving force behind Proposition 13, which was approved by California voters in June 1978. Proposition 13 significantly reduced property taxes, causing a short-term budget crisis due to a drop in tax revenue of 60%. It also permanently limited the rate at which California property tax assessments could rise, so long as the property is not sold. This results in a property tax bill that is predictable from one year to the next, and, because the rate is lower than the market rate, also in substantial tax inequity between neighboring properties that have been owned for different lengths of time.

== History ==
Following the passage of Proposition 13 in June 1978, anti-tax activist Howard Jarvis founded an organization called the California Tax Reduction Movement. The goals of this organization were to protect Proposition 13 and further the "taxpayer revolt."

Upon Jarvis's death in 1986, his former personal assistant Joel Fox took over as the organization's head, formally incorporating and changing its name to Howard Jarvis Taxpayers Association. Fox was the first president of the association, and served until the end of 1998. During this time, the association became a politically powerful organization in California.

=== Nordlinger v. Hahn Legal Challenge to Proposition 13 ===
Fox guided the association against a successful legal challenge to Proposition 13 that landed before the United States Supreme Court. The case, known as Nordlinger v. Hahn, involved the issue of whether Proposition 13's reassessment scheme violated the Equal Protection Clause of the Fourteenth Amendment to the United States Constitution. On June 18, 1992, the court held that Proposition 13's acquisition-value assessment scheme does not violate the federal Equal Protection Clause.

When the court agreed to hear the Nordlinger case, Fox said the case was "life or death for Proposition 13." Fox also said:

We will prove once and for all time that Proposition 13 is constitutional. We will show the court that Proposition 13 is sound policy benefiting all California property owners. By basing property taxes on the ability to pay at the time of voluntary purchase, and guaranteeing certainty as to what taxes will be in the future, Proposition 13 protects taxpayers from losing their homes to the tax collector. These benefits are available equally to all property owners.

=== Proposition 218 (1996) ===
In 1996, the association successfully led Proposition 218 ("Right To Vote On Taxes Act"), sponsored by the association, as a constitutional follow-up to Proposition 13. Proposition 218 established constitutional limits on the ability of local governments to levy benefit assessments on real property and property-related fees and charges. Proposition 218 also requires voter approval before a local government can impose, increase, or extend any local tax. Proposition 218 also constitutionally reserves to local voters the right to use the initiative power to reduce or repeal any local tax, assessment, fee or charge. The Proposition 218 constitutional amendment is the only successful statewide ballot initiative sponsored by the association since its formation.

=== New president ===
In 1999, Jon Coupal, who had been Director of Legal Affairs for the association from 1991 to 1998, became its second president. Coupal writes a column on California issues every Sunday in the Opinion section on the Southern California News Group's eleven newspapers and websites.

Starting in 2003, the association began distributing a weekly opinion piece known as California Commentary.

=== 2026 California Proposition 43 ===
The Howard Jarvis Taxpayers Association is leading the effort to help pass Proposition 43 on the November 2026 ballot in California. Proposition 43 is a proposed constitutional amendment that would close the court-created Upland loophole and restore the two-thirds voter approval requirement for special taxes under Proposition 13 to once again include special taxes placed on the ballot under the initiative power. Proposition 43 would restore the state of the law that existed in California for decades before the 2017 Upland decision which has allowed politicians and groups supporting local tax increases to evade the two-thirds voter approval requirement for special taxes under Proposition 13.
