= Mello-Roos =

Special districts in California, US

Community Facilities Districts (CFDs), more commonly known as Mello-Roos, are special districts established by local governments in California as a means of obtaining additional public funding. Counties, cities, special districts, joint powers authority, and school districts in California use these financing districts to pay for public works and some public services.

== History ==
The Community Facilities Act was a law enacted by the California State Legislature in 1982. The name Mello-Roos is derived from its co-authors, Senator Henry J. Mello (D-Watsonville) and Assemblyman Mike Roos (D-Los Angeles).

When Proposition 13 passed in California in 1978, it limited the property tax rate and the ability of local governments to increase the assessed value of real property by not more than an annual inflation factor. As a result, the budget for public services and for the construction of public facilities could not continue unabated. New ways to fund local public improvements and services were considered and adopted by the California State Legislature. A Mello-Roos tax is not a parcel tax, however it still circumvents Proposition 13 (which limits property taxes based on the assessed value of real property) because it is levied on the assessed value of land, rather than real estate value (including land and improvements).

== Districts and taxes ==
California Proposition 218 (1996) constitutionally requires two-thirds (2/3) voter approval to approve the formation of a Mello-Roos Community Facilities District. In instances where the number of registered voters within a Community Facilities District is very small, the required election is held as a property owner election. Sometimes a real estate developer is the only "voter" in such property owner elections that approve a Mello-Roos tax.

Once approved, a Mello-Roos Community Facilities District is formed. Once formed, a special tax (which is different from regular property tax) is imposed on all property within the community facilities district. The Mello-Roos special tax is in addition to the regular ad valorem property tax on the property. The Mello-Roos special tax is based on a formula that is specific to that district, that was approved in proceedings. The formula can be based on a variety of factors but cannot be based on the value of the property. In practice, most Mello-Roos community facilities districts base the special tax on a number of common formulas, such as the square footage of the improvements, or proximity to a specific improvement, or based on the acreage of the lot. This is spelled out in the "Rate and Method of Apportionment" of the special tax, which is a legal document approved in the proceedings.

These districts can be used to pay for ongoing services (such as enhanced landscaping within a community). Or, if approved by voters, the special tax may be used as the security on which to issue land-secured municipal bonds (debt). If debt is approved, the special tax will repay the bond principal and interest each year.

Mello-Roos community facilities districts may pay for the following public improvements and services: streets, water, sewage and drainage, electricity, infrastructure, schools, parks and police protection to newly developing areas.

== Tax deduction ==
There is conflicting information on whether Mello-Roos taxes are deductible from federal and state income taxes. In general, only "ad valorem" property taxes (based on the value of the property) are deductible. Mello-Roos taxes are not ad valorem property taxes, but rather are generally flat parcel taxes. However, the IRS has stated that:

Assessments on real property owners, based other than on the assessed value of the property, may be deductible if they are levied for the general public welfare by a proper taxing authority at a like rate on owners of all properties in the taxing authority's jurisdiction, and if the assessments are not for local benefits (unless for maintenance or interest charges).

California uses the federal standard for deductibility of property taxes on state income tax. In either case, the taxpayer has the burden to establish that the deduction of Mello-Roos taxes falls under these criteria on audit.

== New communities ==
Many communities requiring new schools or other public infrastructure such as public parks and roads impose Mello-Roos taxes as an alternative to (or in addition to) impact fees paid directly by real estate developers. While real property taxes are generally levied as a percentage of the assessed value of the parcel, a Mello-Roos tax is levied independent of assessed property value (a parcel tax), and is not subject to Proposition 13 property tax rate limitations.

== Older communities ==
Many older communities have imposed Mello-Roos taxes on areas that include older homes not previously subject to Mello-Roos taxes. This is done when property tax revenues fall short of what is deemed "necessary" by the local government, or expenditures increase such as from the increased burden resulting from public employee salaries and benefits (including pensions). Many Community Facilities Districts also renew expiring Mello-Roos taxes and increase existing Mello-Roos taxes. Two-thirds (2/3) voter approval is required under Proposition 218 (1996) to increase or extend a Mello-Roos tax.

== Reduction or repeal using Proposition 218 ==
Proposition 218 was an initiative constitutional amendment approved by California voters on November 5, 1996. Called the "Right to Vote on Taxes Act," Proposition 218 was a constitutional follow-up to Proposition 13. Proposition 218 includes a provision constitutionally reserving to local voters the right to use the initiative power to reduce or repeal any local tax, assessment, fee or charge, including provision for a significantly reduced petition signature requirement to qualify a measure on the ballot.

A Mello-Roos tax or charge levied to finance a service is generally subject to reduction or repeal using the local initiative power under Proposition 218, including the significantly reduced petition signature requirement thereunder. This provides local voters within a Community Facilities District with a readily available legislative remedy to address issues of inequity associated with the financing of local public services in a community.

Examples where the reduction or repeal of a Mello-Roos tax on services may be appropriate include where voters desire to eliminate or reduce a public service currently provided by a local government, where voters believe certain public services currently provided by a local government can be more cost-effectively delivered by the private sector such as by a local property owners association, where voters did not previously vote in a registered voter election on a Mello-Roos tax, and where voters believe they are bearing a disproportionate and/or unfair tax burden compared to others in the community.

A Mello-Roos tax or charge levied to repay bonds is a legally more complex situation because federal contract impairment issues may preclude the exercise of the local initiative power under Proposition 218. Advice from legal counsel is generally needed in such situations. A local compensatory initiative under Proposition 218 is an alternative option when contract impairment problems are present.

== See also ==
- Community Development District -The Florida model for the Mello-Roos Community Facilities Act
- Parcel tax
- Property Tax
