= Mike Roos =

American politician

Majority Leader of the California Assembly
- In office December 2, 1980 – November 30, 1986
- Preceded by: Howard Berman
- Succeeded by: Thomas M. Hannigan

Member of the California State Assembly from the 46th district
- In office June 24, 1977 – March 20, 1991
- Preceded by: Charles Warren
- Succeeded by: Barbara Friedman

Personal details
- Born: Michael Yancey Roos; August 6, 1945 (age 81) Memphis, Tennessee, U.S.
- Party: Democratic
- Spouses: Ann Marie Roos (m. 1967; div. 1980) Tracey Baird (m. 2010)
- Children: 4
- Education: University of Southern California; Tulane University
- Occupation: Public Affairs Management
- Website: www.mroosco.com

Michael Yancey Roos (born August 6, 1945) is an American political strategist and former legislative leader in the California State Assembly, which he served for over 14 years. He is known for the Community Facilities District Act, alternatively known as the Mello-Roos Act.

== Career ==
=== Early career ===
Before his election to the California State Assembly, he was chief deputy to Los Angeles City Councilmember, Marvin Braude, and served as executive director of the Coro Foundation, a leadership training program for future leaders in government and public affairs.

In 1976, he served as a member of the State Finance Committee for Jimmy Carter's presidential campaign. President Carter named him to the position of state director of his 1980 presidential campaign in California. In 1988, he was the California co-chair for U.S. senator Paul Simon’s presidential campaign.

=== State assembly ===
In 1977, he ran during a special election as the Democratic candidate for Assembly to succeed Charles Warren, who Carter appointed to head the Council on Environmental Quality in Washington, DC. In 1977 he was elected to the California State Assembly, serving 14 years in various capacities.

In his second legislative term, he was chosen by his caucus as Majority Floor Leader. He served as (Democrat) Majority Floor Leader for six years until he was elected Speaker Pro Tempore of the California State Assembly. Some of his major legislative achievements include the Roberti-Roos Weapons Control Act of 1989 - landmark legislation banning assault weapons, the first in the history of the United States, and the Mello-Roos Community Facilities Act of 1982, which provided local government with an innovative, alternate method of financing basic and much needed public facilities. The first and strictest laws to date protecting the confidentiality of HIV test results were authored by him in 1985, as well as the law creating the pioneer Alternative Test Sites Program, which established centers where individuals could receive free, anonymous testing for the AIDS antibody. He also authored legislation prohibiting sex discrimination in California educational institutions and was instrumental in enacting a model curriculum for K-12 students to explore the issues of human rights, genocide and the internment of Japanese Americans during World War II. Near the end of his final term, Roos left the legislature and became President and CEO of LEARN.

=== Private Enterprise ===
Mike Roos served as president and CEO of LEARN, a coalition of civic leaders and representatives of Los Angeles’ diverse education, ethnic, business, labor, academic, religious and social advocacy constituencies organized in 1991, to implement systemic reform and restructuring within the Los Angeles Unified School District.

In 1997, Mike approached Actor/Director/Producer, Rob Reiner with an idea to link an increase in the cigarette tax with Reiner's passion and policy interest in early childhood development. Roos served as the campaign director for California Children and Families Initiative. In 1998, this initiative qualified as Prop 10, State and County Early Childhood Development Programs. As of 2018, it raises approximately a billion dollars annually distributed to programs designed by each of California's 58 counties. He was also the chair of Prop 34 which passed in 2000, and Prop 46 that passed in 2002. He was also the chair of Prop 34, which passed in 2000, and Prop 46 that passed in 2002.

After his career in the California State Assembly, he became the founder and chief-consultant of Mike Roos and Company, a public affairs and management company Roos founded in 1999. The company that he founded includes

- government relations
- corporate issues management
- media relations
- ballot measure campaigns

== Legislative achievements ==
- Roberti-Roos Weapons Control Act of 1989 – landmark legislation banning assault weapons
- Mello Roos Community Facilities Act of 1982

== Positions ==
Mike served as chairman of the Fraternity of Friends of the Music Center. He served on the Queenscare board of directors, a non-profit Healthcare Foundation, and is co-chair of the Los Angeles Children's Museum. He was appointed by Mayor James Hahn to serve as president of the Los Angeles Recreation and Parks Commission and as a member of the Los Angeles Memorial Coliseum Commission. He was president of the Los Angeles Memorial Coliseum Commission in 1998. In 2003, he was elected to the board of directors for the Southern California Golf Association Foundation. He is currently the president of the Southern California Leadership Council, a non-partisan, non-profit, public policy partnership led by three former governors and almost three dozen presidents and CEOs of top Southern California companies.

== Personal information ==
Mike was born in 1945 in Memphis, Tennessee. He is the son of Walter Roos and Francis Melissa, both of Memphis, Tennessee. He was the first of three children. A former resident of Silver Lake estates, He continues to live in Los Angeles with his wife and near his daughters Shelby and Melissa and stepdaughters Alexandra and Whitney.

== Education ==
Mike Roos attended and graduated Christian Brothers High School (Memphis). He received a Bachelor of Arts degree in political science from Tulane University in New Orleans, where he earned a grant-in-aid for baseball. He lettered all four years and had the distinction of being the last Tulane baseball player, along with Ronnie Scott, selected to an all south eastern conference baseball team. In 2005, he was inducted into the Tulane Athletic Hall of Fame. After receiving a political science degree in 1967, he moved west to accept a National Institute of Child Health Fellowship at the University of Southern California, and graduated in 1970 with a master's degree in public administration.

== Legacies ==
A collection of his official papers resides at the Loyola Marymount University Department of Archives and Special Collections.
