= Parcel tax =

Form of real estate tax

The parcel tax is a form of real estate tax. Unlike most real estate taxes or a land value tax, it is not directly based on property value. It funds K–12 public education and community facilities districts, which are usually known as "Mello-Roos" districts. The California parcel tax, in its typical form as a flat tax, is regressive.

Most parcel taxes are a fixed amount per parcel, but some are based on the size of the parcel or its improvements.

== Origin ==
Parcel taxes originated in response to California's Proposition 13 (1978), a state initiative constitutional amendment approved by California voters in June 1978. Proposition 13 limited the property tax rate based on the assessed value of real estate to 1% per year. However, a parcel tax circumvents the property tax rate limits of Proposition 13 because it does not vary according to the assessed value of the property. As a result, a parcel tax does not violate the ad valorem property tax rate limits of Proposition 13.

== Operation ==
=== Voter approval ===
Simple majority vote parcel taxes were found unconstitutional under the uniformity of property taxation provision of the California Constitution. To the extent parcel taxes are legally authorized and allowed by law, Proposition 218 (1996) ("Right to Vote on Taxes Act") requires every parcel tax be levied as a special tax (a tax legally dedicated for specific purposes) subject to two-thirds voter approval. The two-thirds voter approval requirement has also been applied to a local parcel tax initiative measure proposed by the electorate exercising the local initiative power.

=== Uniformity requirement and other statutory limitations ===
The legal authority to levy a parcel tax comes from California state statutes which usually include additional restrictions and limitations on the ability of a local government to levy a parcel tax. The requirement that many parcel taxes apply uniformly to all taxpayers or all real property within a local government is a direct result of statutory restrictions imposed by the California Legislature and not as a result of any requirements under the California Constitution, including Proposition 13. There has been significant political opposition to easing the statutory uniformity requirement for parcel taxes, especially from the business community which would incur a significant increased (but generally more equitable) property tax burden if the uniformity requirement were eased by the California Legislature.

== Fairness ==
Due to the statutory uniformity requirement for most local government parcel taxes, major tax fairness issues arise. Flat parcel taxes are very regressive because they require owners of smaller or lower valued property to pay the same total amount as owners of larger or higher valued property, which many homeowners believe to be unfair. To be less regressive, parcel taxes should not be flat but instead be based on parcel size.

When the Alameda Unified School District attempted to mitigate this inequity by imposing a parcel tax that would require large commercial properties to pay a larger tax amount than residential homeowners, a California appeals court declared the tax invalid. In response, the California State Senate passed a bill by Governance and Finance Chair Lois Wolk to authorize school districts to levy a higher parcel tax on commercial property, but the bill then subsequently failed to pass in an Assembly committee.

=== Proportion of single-family residential parcels ===
Since in most California communities the vast majority of taxable parcels are single-family residential, the statutory uniformity requirement results in most of the tax burden for a parcel tax falling on single-family residential property owners. For example, in Los Angeles County about 79% of the taxable parcels are single-family residential parcels (including condominiums). As another example, in Santa Clara County about 88% of the taxable parcels are single-family residential parcels (including condominiums). It is for this reason local business communities are often supportive of parcel taxes because the tax burden on commercial parcels, especially large commercial parcels, is very low. Business interest groups in California such as the Bay Area Council, the Silicon Valley Leadership Group, and the Los Angeles Area Chamber of Commerce frequently support parcel taxes that disproportionately burden single-family residential parcels.

=== Burden on property owners over other potential revenue sources ===
Significant fairness issues associated with parcel taxes also arise concerning the appropriateness of singling out property owners to bear the additional tax burden for financing some public services and programs, especially those services and programs that provide general benefits to the community at large (other than property owners) or benefits to nonresidents of a community who may pay little or no taxes to the local government. However, a study shows that the percentage of renters in a school district has no impact on the likelihood of getting a parcel tax measure approved in school districts.

=== Burden versus benefits ===
Parcel taxes also don’t legally require any relationship between the tax amount paid (or the ability to pay) and the benefits received. As a result, it is up to local voters in a parcel tax election to carefully weigh and evaluate the merits of any parcel tax proposal.

In some instances, other types of taxes may be more equitable. In other instances, other financing mechanisms may be more appropriate to finance all or part of the public services or improvements under consideration. For example, special assessments on real property are appropriately used to finance public services and improvements that specially benefit property above and beyond benefits received by the community at large. This is particularly appropriate where a small number of parcels, such as large commercial (business) parcels, receive special benefits not shared by the rest of the community.

==== Cumulative tax burden ====
Local voters must also consider the cumulative tax burden associated with a specific parcel tax proposal. Some parcel tax proposals may be relatively modest in amount but when added to the other parcel levies that already appear on the property tax bill would add to a cumulative tax burden that may already be unacceptable to many property taxpayers (especially homeowners). Furthermore, passage of a parcel tax establishes political precedent that can lead to additional and often more expensive parcel tax measures in the future by the same or other local governments in the area.

==== Effects on K-12 school funding ====
Research has shown that California school districts able to pass parcel tax measures tend to be more prosperous and to have lower percentages of minority students than those where parcel tax measures failed, or were never proposed. For example, in Oakland, California, where 68.5% of the students qualify for free lunch programs, property owners pay a $195 annual parcel tax while in its enclave Piedmont, where 0.3% of students qualify for free lunch programs, owners pay at minimum a $1,200 annual parcel tax. Over 80% of school districts with voter-approved parcel taxes are in the relatively wealthy San Francisco Bay Area. In addition, in the case of school parcel taxes, a study shows that school districts where home values are more or less similar have a greater likelihood of raising parcel tax revenues, compared to school districts where home values are greatly different.

The preceding also raises significant school funding equity issues under the California Supreme Court Serrano decisions. The Serrano cases did not specifically address the legality of K-12 public education parcel taxes because such taxes did not exist at that time.

== Reduction-or-repeal process ==
Proposition 218 (1996) ("Right to Vote on Taxes Act") constitutionally reserves to local voters the right to use the initiative power to reduce or repeal any local tax, assessment, fee or charge, including provision for a significantly reduced petition signature requirement to qualify a measure on the ballot. A local initiative under Proposition 218 can target for reduction or repeal local government parcel taxes, especially in situations where major tax fairness issues are present in a particular community.

A local initiative under Proposition 218 could also be pursued as a tie-in initiative that would tie the continued imposition of a parcel tax to satisfaction of specified conditions. For example, a local initiative could attach an annual matching contribution condition whereby a parcel tax would be reduced or repealed if the specified annual matching contribution condition is not satisfied. A matching contribution condition is intended to leverage additional financial support as well as to demonstrate a strong financial commitment to the purposes for which the parcel tax is imposed, especially from those interests who promoted the parcel tax. Matching contributions typically come from the private sector in the form of voluntary payments such as from the local business community. This approach is particularly appropriate in places like Los Angeles County and the Silicon Valley where the local business community tends to be big supporters of tax increases that disproportionately burden ordinary taxpayers, such as parcel taxes, but generally opposes tax increases on the business community for the same public purposes.

== See also ==
- California Proposition 13 (1978)
- California Proposition 218 (1996)
- California Proposition 218 (1996) Local Initiative Power
- Property tax
- Mello-Roos taxes and districts
