= Bradley-Burns Uniform Local Sales and Use Tax Law =

Tax law of California, United States

California State Legislature
- Introduced: 1955; 70 years ago
- Signed into law: 1955; 70 years ago
- Governor: Goodwin Knight
- Code: California Revenue and Taxation Code
- Section: Part 1.5, Division 2
- Website: cdtfa.ca.gov

Status: Amended

The Bradley-Burns Uniform Local Sales and Use Tax Law is a California law enacted in 1955 that governs the imposition and collection of local sales and use taxes.

== History and purpose ==
The Bradley-Burns law was introduced as a response to the proliferation of local sales and use tax ordinances enacted by California cities and counties between the 1940s and 1950s. This explosion of diverse tax regulations created compliance difficulties for both taxpayers and tax administrators. The primary purpose of the law was to establish a uniform system for sourcing and collecting local sales and use taxes, thereby simplifying the tax landscape for businesses and local governments.

== Key provisions ==
=== Authorization for local taxes ===
The Bradley-Burns law authorizes counties and cities to impose local sales and use taxes in accordance with its provisions. These taxes apply to tangible personal property sold at retail in the county or city, or purchased for storage, use, or other consumption within the jurisdiction.

=== Tax rate and structure ===
Under the Bradley-Burns law, local jurisdictions can adopt a uniform local sales and use tax rate of up to 1% based on the price of property sold at retail. This 1% is typically broken down as follows:

- 0.75% goes to the city where the sale occurs (or to the county if the sale occurs in an unincorporated area)
- 0.25% goes to the county transportation fund

=== Place of sale ===
The law stipulates that all retail sales are consummated at the place of business of the retailer unless otherwise specified.

=== Administration and collection ===
Local agencies are required to contract with the California Department of Tax and Fee Administration (CDTFA) for the administration and collection of these taxes. The CDTFA is responsible for transmitting the collected taxes to the respective cities or counties.

== Impact ==
=== Revenue generation ===
The Bradley-Burns tax is a significant source of revenue for local governments in California. On average, it provides around 30% of a city's general-purpose revenues, although this percentage can vary widely among different municipalities.

=== General fund allocation ===
The basic Bradley-Burns rate is considered a general tax, meaning its uses are unrestricted and can be allocated for general government purposes. These revenues typically go into a city's general fund, providing flexibility in their use for various municipal needs.

=== Constitutional protections ===
The Bradley-Burns tax revenues have received constitutional protection through voter-approved measures. Proposition 1A in 2004 and Proposition 22 in 2010 prohibit the state from reducing the local sales and use tax rate or altering its allocation method, ensuring a level of fiscal stability for local governments.

== See also ==
- Taxation in California
