= California Senate Bill 531 (2019) =

California State Legislature
- Introduced: February 21, 2019
- Assembly voted: September 5, 2019 (48-21)
- Senate voted: May 16, 2019 (27-8)
- Sponsor(s): Steve Glazer, Robert Hertzberg
- Governor: Gavin Newsom
- Code: Government Code
- Section: § 53084.5
- Bill: SB 531
- Associated bills: AB 485 (2019)
- Website: Text

Status: Not passed (Vetoed)

In the 2019-2020 regular session of the California State Legislature, SB 531 was introduced to ban local governments from providing sales tax kickbacks to e-commerce businesses for using that jurisdiction as the point of sale. The bill passed both houses of the legislature, but was vetoed by Governor Gavin Newsom.

== Background ==
The California State Board of Equalization generally requires that online sales be taxed according to a seller's location. Companies can consolidate all of their online sales into a single location, giving its local jurisdiction the benefit of all online sales taxes collected by the company statewide. In order to redirect local tax revenues into their own treasuries, cities have created revenue-sharing incentives for companies to use their jurisdictions as the point of sale. The companies typically receive half of the city's sales tax revenue as a rebate, which is therefore lost from being spent on public services statewide. Examples of such arrangements include:

- Ontario: QVC and Nike, Inc.
- Dinuba: Best Buy
- Fresno: Ulta Beauty
- Sacramento: Macy's
- Cupertino: Apple Inc.
- San Bruno: Walmart
