= 2026 California Proposition 43 =

Ballot initiative

Proposition 43
- November 3, 2026
- Restoration Two-Thirds Vote Requirement for Local Initiative Special Taxes Amendment
- Reporting: 96% as of November 13, 2026 at 7:34 PM PST

Results
Choice	Votes	%
Yes	5,300,843	42.39%
No	7,204,200	57.61%
Total votes	12,505,043	100.00%
County results
Yes
60–70%
50–60%
No
70–80%
60–70%
50–60%

Proposition 43 is a proposed legislative constitutional amendment that was on the November 3, 2026, ballot in California.

The initiative, which was rejected by voters, would have expanded the two-thirds voter approval requirement to impose, extend, or increase a local special (legally dedicated) tax under Proposition 13 to specifically include any proposed special tax that qualifies for the ballot under the local initiative power. Proposition 43 would have also prohibited local governments, including under the local initiative power, from imposing additional ad valorem taxes on real property (taxes based on the assessed value of property), except as otherwise allowed under the California Constitution.

Proposition 43 was proposed to overturn appellate court rulings following the 2017 California Cannabis Coalition v. City of Upland decision by the California Supreme Court, which held that there was a distinction between taxes proposed by the governing body of a local government and taxes proposed under the local initiative power for purposes of applying the two-thirds voter approval requirement for special taxes under Proposition 13. These appellate court rulings held that citizen-led special tax proposals under the local initiative power were not subject to the two-thirds voter approval requirement under Proposition 13.

Proposition 43 was placed on the ballot by legislative referral with bipartisan support from both Democrats and Republicans in the California State Legislature, as a compromise for the withdrawal of a broader initiative proposal. Most Democratic legislators supported the compromise resulting in the placement of Proposition 43 on the ballot, but opposed the proposition itself.

== Background ==
On three previous occasions, California voters approved the two-thirds voter approval requirement for local special taxes when they adopted the Proposition 13 initiative constitutional amendment in 1978, the Proposition 62 statutory initiative in 1986, and the Proposition 218 (“Right to Vote on Taxes Act”) initiative constitutional amendment in 1996.

In 1987, a California appellate court in Altadena Library District v. Bloodgood held that the two-thirds voter approval requirement for local special taxes under Proposition 13 did apply to a local initiative special tax increase proposed by the electorate under the local initiative power. The Altadena Library case was later cited with approval by the California Supreme Court in a 1995 case upholding the statutory voter approval requirements for local taxes under 1986 Proposition 62, including the two-thirds voter approval requirement for local special taxes. The precedent established by the Altadena Library case, that local special tax initiatives were subject to two-thirds voter approval under Proposition 13, held until 2017.

=== 2017 Upland decision and later court rulings ===
In the 2017 California Cannabis Coalition v. City of Upland case relating to Proposition 218 (“Right to Vote on Taxes Act”—a constitutional follow-up to Proposition 13), a divided California Supreme Court held that there was a distinction between taxes proposed by the governing body of a local government and taxes proposed under the local initiative power for purposes of applying the voter approval requirements under constitutional tax limitation laws such as Proposition 13.

The Upland decision was controversial and had an extensive dissenting opinion written by Justice Leondra Kruger and joined by Justice Goodwin Liu, both appointed by former Democratic Governor Jerry Brown. In her dissenting opinion, Kruger wrote that the voters never intended to distinguish between taxes placed on the ballot by the governing body and those proposed under the initiative power so as to create an exemption from Proposition 13 voter approval requirements for special tax increases proposed under the local initiative power.

Local special taxes placed on the ballot by a local governing body such as a city council or a county board of supervisors are subject to two-thirds voter approval under Proposition 13. However, the majority opinion in the Upland case contained ambiguous language on whether or not the two-thirds vote requirement under Proposition 13 applied to citizen-led special tax initiatives. This ambiguity led to lower appellate courts subsequently ruling that the two-thirds vote requirement for special taxes under Proposition 13 does not apply to citizen-led initiatives. To date, the California Supreme Court has not clarified the ambiguous language in the Upland decision or to resolve the conflict with the 1987 Altadena Library case which applied the two-thirds voter approval requirement to a local initiative special tax.

The Upland decision and following appellate court rulings thus lowered the threshold required to enact local special tax measures proposed under the initiative power. Following these rulings, many local initiative special tax increases passed with simple majority rather than two-thirds voter approval. These include the Measure ULA (2022) “mansion tax” in Los Angeles, the Proposition C business tax in San Francisco, and several local sales and property tax increases. The primary purpose of Proposition 43 is to restore the higher approval threshold for special taxes proposed under the local initiative power.

== History ==
=== Proposed initiative constitutional amendment ===
In response to local special tax increases imposed simple majority rather than two-thirds voter approval, an initiative constitutional amendment known as the “Local Taxpayer Protection Act to Save Proposition 13” was filed and later obtained sufficient signatures to appear on the November 2026 statewide ballot in California.

The “Local Taxpayer Protection Act to Save Proposition 13” initiative contained several integrated components that included: (1) specifying that the two-thirds vote requirement under Proposition 13 applies to special taxes proposed under the local initiative power; (2) significantly limiting the ability of local governments to impose real property transfer taxes like the Measure ULA "mansion tax" in Los Angeles; (3) ending existing initiative parcel taxes enacted without two-thirds voter approval; and (4) ending existing real property transfer taxes levied in charter cities, including the Measure ULA “mansion tax” in Los Angeles.

=== Legislative proposal and Proposition 43 ===
Ultimately, a bipartisan compromise was reached that resulted in the “Local Taxpayer Protection Act to Save Proposition 13” initiative being withdrawn from the ballot by the initiative proponent in favor of a more limited proposed constitutional amendment placed on the ballot by the California Legislature (ACA 22). In exchange for withdrawal of the initiative measure, the Legislature also agreed to remove from the ballot another proposed legislative constitutional amendment (ACA 13) that would have required tax limitation constitutional amendments containing supermajority vote requirements to be passed by the same supermajority vote requirement that they require. ACA 22 was passed with bipartisan support by a 68–2 vote in the California State Assembly and by a 35–1 vote in the California State Senate. While most Democratic legislators voted in favor of ACA 22 as a compromise, most Democrats opposed the proposition itself; its author, Democratic Assemblymember Buffy Wicks, "said she wrote it merely to kill a worse proposal". ACA 22 was numbered as Proposition 43 on the ballot.

Under Proposition 43, only the portion that would extend the two-thirds vote requirement to include special taxes proposed by initiative appeared on the November 2026 ballot in California. Other components of the initiative proposal did not appear on the November 2026 ballot, including the limitations on real property transfer taxes and the provisions ending any already existing local taxes.
