= 1996 California Proposition 218 (Local Initiative Power) =

Referendum on taxation

Proposition 218 is an adopted initiative constitutional amendment in the state of California that appeared on the November 5, 1996, statewide election ballot. Proposition 218 revolutionized local and regional government finance in California. Called the “Right to Vote on Taxes Act,” Proposition 218 was sponsored by the Howard Jarvis Taxpayers Association as a constitutional follow-up to the landmark Proposition 13 property tax revolt initiative constitutional amendment approved by California voters on June 6, 1978. Proposition 218 was drafted by constitutional attorneys Jonathan Coupal and Jack Cohen.

One of the most significant provisions of Proposition 218 constitutionally reserves to local voters the exercise of the initiative power to reduce or repeal any local tax, assessment, fee, or charge. This includes a significantly reduced signature requirement making ballot qualification easier for local voters. Proposition 218 was the first successful initiative measure in California history to alter the scope of the constitutional initiative power.

== Overview of local initiative power under Proposition 218 ==
The initiative is the constitutionally reserved power of the voters to propose laws and thereafter to adopt or reject them. The local initiative power under Proposition 218 is a powerful tool available to voters, particularly when local elected officials are not responsive to their constituents in matters relating to local taxes, assessments, fees, and charges.

The specific constitutional language applicable to the local initiative power under Proposition 218 (contained in Section 3 of Article XIII C of the California Constitution) states:

“SEC. 3. Initiative Power for Local Taxes, Assessments, Fees and Charges. Notwithstanding any other provision of this Constitution, including, but not limited to, Sections 8 and 9 of Article II, the initiative power shall not be prohibited or otherwise limited in matters of reducing or repealing any local tax, assessment, fee or charge. The power of initiative to affect local taxes, assessments, fees and charges shall be applicable to all local governments and neither the Legislature nor any local government charter shall impose a signature requirement higher than that applicable to statewide statutory initiatives.”

The Impartial Analysis of Proposition 218 prepared by the California Legislative Analyst, as contained in the Official Ballot Pamphlet provided to California voters, stated:

“Initiative Powers. The measure states that Californians have the power to repeal or reduce any local tax, assessment, or fee through the initiative process. This provision broadens the existing initiative powers available under the State Constitution and local charters.”

Shortly after the passage of Proposition 218, the California Legislative Analyst wrote the following about the local initiative power under Proposition 218:

“Proposition 218 eliminates any ambiguity regarding the power of local residents to use the initiative by stating that residents of California shall have the power to repeal or reduce any local tax, assessment, or fee. In addition, the measure forbids the Legislature and local governments from imposing a signature requirement for local initiatives that is higher than that applicable to statewide statutory initiatives. As a consequence of these provisions, the only limits on local residents’ ability to overturn local revenue raising measures appear to be those in the federal constitution, such as the federal debt impairment clause.”

== Reduced signature requirement ==
The local initiative power under Proposition 218 is also subject to a significantly reduced signature requirement which cannot exceed the requirement applicable to statewide statutory initiatives. Thus, the specific maximum signature requirement under Proposition 218 is five percent (5%) of the votes cast for all candidates for Governor at the last gubernatorial election within the territory of the local government.

Data needed to compute the applicable signature requirement for a local government with respect to the exercise of the local initiative power under Proposition 218 (total number of gubernatorial election votes) is generally available from local county registrars of voters. The Supplement to the Statement of Vote published by the California Secretary of State also contains data needed to calculate the applicable signature requirement in counties as well as cities, and a copy of the supplement must legally be made available upon request to any California voter.

== Example uses ==
The local initiative power under Proposition 218 can be used to reduce or repeal local taxes like utility user taxes, sales taxes, business taxes, parcel taxes, and also to reduce or repeal local fees and charges such as stormwater fees, groundwater fees, public ambulance/paramedic fees, public park/sports fees, public parking fees, or utility fees and charges for water (including drought fees and surcharges), sewer, or refuse collection services.

The local initiative power under Proposition 218 has been used to propose the repeal of local taxes in sanctuary cities. Significant controversy has also occurred from use of the local initiative power under Proposition 218 to reduce or repeal public agency domestic water rates and charges.

=== Accountability Tool ===
Exercise of the local initiative power under Proposition 218 gives voters a powerful tool to use such as when local government officials are not responsive to the needs of their constituents, when local voters have not previously voted on a particular levy (including special taxes for services in many Mello-Roos Districts), when there has been significant waste or mismanagement by a local government, when there has been a controversial expenditure of revenue proceeds by a local government, when the amount of a local levy is excessive or unreasonable, or when promises previously made by local politicians about the imposition of a levy are broken.

Sometimes even the mere mention or threat by voters to pursue a local reduction or repeal initiative under Proposition 218 will result in local government officials being more responsive to the concerns of the public regarding a particular local tax, assessment, fee or charge.

=== Alternative to Litigation ===
The local initiative power under Proposition 218 can also be used as an alternative to litigation (such as when cost, time delay, or legal risk issues might not make litigation an attractive option), and has also been successfully used as a legislative remedy to reduce or repeal a local levy following the defeat of a lawsuit challenging the validity of the levy under Proposition 218. There have also been instances where the local initiative power under Proposition 218 has been successfully used concurrently with pending litigation.

=== When Legal Remedy Not Available ===
The local initiative power under Proposition 218 is also an available legislative remedy in situations where a legal remedy may not be available such as when the applicable statute of limitations has run or when other legal procedural impediments are present (e.g., exhaustion of remedies, standing, or claims requirements).

== Example Levies Subject to Reduction or Repeal ==
The local initiative power under Proposition 218 can be used to target specific components of a local government levy to better achieve public policy goals as well as to increase the chances of a local initiative being approved by voters. This approach is especially useful in situations where a local levy repeal is politically or legally problematic. Often, a more specifically targeted levy reduction will have a significantly better chance of being approved by local voters and withstanding a legal challenge.

=== Local Utility User Taxes ===
An example application involves local utility user taxes. Utility user taxes are imposed on one or more utility services, including water, electricity, sewer, gas, telephone, cable television, and refuse collection.

Utility user taxes are sometimes a significant revenue source for a local government. This can make the complete repeal of a local utility users tax politically problematic. Rather than providing for a complete repeal of a local utility user tax, a local initiative could target tax relief for just the residential utility customers while leaving utility tax rates for commercial customers unchanged. Another application could target a particular utility service for tax relief while leaving the tax rate for other utility services unchanged. Similar to the foregoing would involve reducing just a utility users tax for electric service to offset historical and/or current electricity utility fee transfers to the general fund of the local government, which transfers the courts have generally allowed.

Yet another application could target local utility user tax “modernization” measures that have been approved by voters over the past few years. In some instances, voters may have unknowingly authorized the imposition of a tax on online video streaming services in approving a local utility user tax “modernization” measure. The local initiative power can be used to reduce or repeal a local tax on online video streaming services previously approved under a utility user tax “modernization” measure.

=== Local Utility Fees and Charges ===
Another example involves the reduction or repeal of local government utility fees and charges, particularly local utility fees and charges for domestic water or sanitary sewer services which are not subject to a mandatory election under Proposition 218 prior to their imposition.

Drafting an initiative to reduce or repeal local utility fees or charges generally requires the assistance of expert legal counsel because of numerous legal issues that must be properly addressed, especially if federal contract impairment issues may be present. Furthermore, if state statutes or other laws require local utility rates to be set at specified service levels, those issues must also be taken into consideration and satisfactorily addressed in drafting an initiative.

Local government utility rate repeals are more drastic in their impact, are often more difficult to legally defend, and historically are more difficult to get approved by local voters. Utility rate reductions, especially more modest reduction amounts or reductions spread over time, generally have a better chance of being approved by local voters and withstanding legal scrutiny.

=== Local Stormwater Fees and Charges ===
New or increased stormwater fees and charges imposed by local governments in California (also sometimes referred to as “clean water” fees) are subject to a mandatory property-related fee or charge election under Proposition 218. However, local government imposed stormwater fees and charges existing before Proposition 218 was enacted are not subject to a mandatory election by local voters so long as those fees and charges are not increased. A local initiative could target for reduction or repeal local government stormwater fees and charges existing before Proposition 218 became law, including existing local street cleaning or sweeping fees and charges.

Any new or increased stormwater fee or charge imposed by a local government without complying with the election requirement under Proposition 218 may also be reduced or repealed by the electorate using the local initiative power under Proposition 218. This includes any attempt by a local government relying on SB 231 (2017) to evade the constitutional election requirement for stormwater fees and charges under Proposition 218.

=== Local Sales Taxes ===
A local initiative can target for reduction or repeal local government sales taxes, especially where there has been significant waste and/or mismanagement of sales tax proceeds, when there has been controversial or questionable spending of sales tax proceeds by a local government such as using tax proceeds to pay for excessive public employee salaries and/or benefits like pensions and retiree healthcare, when the programs and services financed from sales tax proceeds are not delivered at an acceptably high level, when voters desire to lower the local sales tax rate in situations where the current tax rate is excessive and/or unreasonably high, when another tax election is desired especially where a local sales tax increase was narrowly approved by voters or otherwise approved under controversial circumstances, or when campaign promises made by local politicians about the expenditure of local sales tax proceeds are broken after voter approval, including in situations where legally nonbinding promises concerning the spending of general sales tax proceeds were made by local politicians before the election.

In some situations, all or a portion of local sales tax proceeds may be pledged to repay bonds issued by the local government (such as for transportation purposes). Consultation with legal counsel is usually needed where bonds are issued and sales tax proceeds are pledged by the local government to repay the bonds.

=== Local Parcel Taxes ===
A local initiative under Proposition 218 can target for reduction or repeal local government parcel taxes, especially in situations where major tax fairness issues are present in a particular community.

=== Local Mello-Roos Taxes ===
Special property taxes for services under the Mello-Roos Community Facilities Act of 1982 are sometimes controversial in a community. A Mello-Roos tax or other charge levied to finance a service is generally subject to reduction or repeal using the local initiative power under Proposition 218.

Examples where the reduction or repeal of a Mello-Roos tax on services may be appropriate include where voters desire to eliminate or reduce a local public service currently provided by government, where voters believe certain local services currently provided by government can be more cost-effectively delivered by the private sector such as by a local property owners association, where voters did not previously vote in a registered voter election on a Mello-Roos tax, and where voters believe they are bearing a disproportionate and/or unfair financial burden compared to others in the community with regard to the financing of one or more general governmental services.

A Mello-Roos tax or other charge levied to repay bonds is a legally more complex situation because federal contract impairment issues may preclude the exercise of the local initiative power. Advice from legal counsel is typically needed in such situations.

=== Local Majority Vote Initiative Special Taxes ===
Following the controversial 2017 California Supreme Court decision in California Cannabis Coalition v. City of Upland, local tax increase initiatives have appeared on the ballot that seek to evade the constitutional two-thirds voter approval requirement for special taxes under Proposition 13 and Proposition 218. These tax increase initiatives appear on the ballot as a result of the exercise of the local initiative power by the electorate as opposed to being placed on the ballot by the governing body of the local government. As a political remedy, a separate local initiative under Proposition 218 can be used to reduce or repeal an initiative special tax approved by less than a two-thirds vote following the California Cannabis Coalition decision. Such an initiative can be done as an alternative to, or concurrent with, any legal remedy for noncompliance with any applicable constitutional voter approval requirements under Proposition 13 and Proposition 218.

=== Local Groundwater Fees ===
The California Supreme Court in 2017 held that a local fee (imposed upon persons) on the extraction of groundwater was generally no longer a property-related fee under Proposition 218. A local initiative under Proposition 218 can be used to reduce or repeal a groundwater fee approved by a local government even though such a fee is no longer subject to constitutional protections applicable to property-related fees.

=== Local General Obligation Bond Taxes ===
When voters approve a local general obligation bond measure in California, the bonds are paid off by property owners via ad valorem (based on assessed value) property tax increases. In some instances, the local initiative power under Proposition 218 may be used to reduce or repeal bond tax authorizations. Because significant federal contract impairment issues are typically present which may preclude the exercise of the local initiative power with respect to such bond taxes, advice from legal counsel is almost always needed. In circumstances where bonds have been authorized but not yet issued by the local government, voters will generally have their best opportunity to reduce or repeal the bond tax authorization.

== Types of local initiatives ==
An initiative to reduce or repeal a local levy may be as simple as a straight reduction or repeal of the levy, or more complex such as tying the reduction or repeal of the levy to satisfaction of specific performance standards set forth in the initiative. Local initiatives generally fall into three types.

=== Traditional Initiatives ===
A traditional initiative involves a straight reduction or repeal of a local tax, assessment, fee or charge. Traditional initiatives usually include specific findings and/or declarations describing the policy reasons for pursuing the initiative.

=== Compensatory Initiatives ===
A compensatory initiative targets one or more alternative revenue sources for reduction or repeal to compensate for the inability, such as for legal or political reasons, to reduce or repeal a particular revenue source. Compensatory initiatives typically contain specific findings and declarations setting forth the compensatory policy reasons for pursuing the local initiative, including reasons why the particular revenue source cannot be pursued and the compensatory nature of the alternative revenue source(s) being reduced or repealed. Several examples follow.

==== Countering Contract Impairment Issues ====
In some instances, it may not be legally possible to target a particular revenue source for reduction or repeal because revenue proceeds have been pledged to repay bonds, and a violation of the contract impairment clause of the United States Constitution would occur if the pledged revenue source were reduced or repealed. A compensatory initiative would target an alternative revenue source for reduction or repeal to compensate for the desired relief not otherwise available due to federal legal constraints.

==== Countering State Restriction Issues ====
In some instances, it may not be legally possible to target a particular utility service fee or charge for reduction or repeal because of California statutory or case law restrictions affecting the exercise of the local initiative power. A compensatory initiative could target an alternative revenue source for reduction or repeal, such as a related utility users tax, to the extent any such legal restrictions exist.

==== Countering Utility Fee and Charge General Fund Transfers ====
In some situations, a local government may be legally allowed to transfer utility fee or charge proceeds to the general fund of the local agency to thereafter be spent at the discretion of local politicians. Such situations may include controversial reimbursements to the general fund for services and/or other benefits provided by the local government to the utility, and legally allowable return on investment (“profit”) utility fee overcharges for electrical or gas service which are not subject to the cost of service constitutional protections under Proposition 218.

An example illustrating the foregoing involves the transfer of “profit” fees and charges by a local government in connection with the provision of electric service. This occurs when the local government overcharges ratepayers for electric service and then transfers a percentage of the utility fee and charge proceeds to the general fund of the local agency to be spent at the discretion of local politicians. If the local agency also levies a utility users tax on electric service, then it may be a better option to pursue a compensatory initiative providing for the repeal or reduction of the utility users tax as it pertains to electric service.

=== Tie-In Initiatives ===
A tie-in initiative ties the magnitude of a levy reduction, or the timing of a levy repeal or reduction, to satisfaction of specified objective performance standards or conditions contained in the local initiative. A properly drafted tie-in initiative generally requires the assistance of legal counsel to ensure compliance with all applicable legal requirements, including the levy reduction or repeal requirement. In addition, technical expertise in the subject area of a tie-in initiative is also usually required. For example, a tie-in initiative involving transportation may also require technical assistance from a transportation professional.

Tie-in initiatives can be applied to existing local revenue sources where voter approval may not have been previously obtained. Tie-in initiatives may also be applied to revenue sources approved by voters in an election required under Proposition 218 but where voters want to hold local government officials accountable for obtaining continued positive results after the election.

==== Satisfaction of Objective Performance Standards ====
An example of a tie-in initiative is the reduction or repeal of a local transportation sales tax if traffic and/or road conditions over time do not significantly improve relative to conditions existing before the imposition of the sales tax. Other examples of tie-in initiatives include tying an education parcel tax to improved student achievement, tying a public safety tax to reduced crime, and tying a utility service fee to completion of specified public improvement projects on schedule and without cost overruns.

==== Matching Contributions ====
A tie-in initiative can also include specific conditions associated with the continued imposition of a levy. For example, a local initiative could attach an annual matching contribution condition whereby a levy such as a tax would be reduced or repealed if the specified annual matching contribution condition is not satisfied. A matching contribution condition is intended to leverage additional financial support as well as to demonstrate a strong financial commitment to the purposes for which the levy is imposed, especially from those interests who promoted the levy. Matching contributions typically come from either other government sources or from the private sector in the form of voluntary payments such as from the local business community. An annual matching condition does not create a legal obligation to pay, but if at any time during the life of the tax the condition is not satisfied, the tax would either be reduced or repealed in accordance with the terms of the local initiative.

== Pure vs. mixed initiatives ==
A pure initiative under Proposition 218 contains subject matter exclusively within the scope of the initiative power thereunder. Such initiatives provide for the reduction or repeal of a local tax, assessment, fee or charge, and generally contain no other substantive provisions. With a pure initiative, the legal authority to exercise that power is derived from the constitutional provisions of Proposition 218 itself, and the initiative proponents may also take advantage of the significantly lower signature requirement.

A mixed initiative under Proposition 218 contains provisions that fall within the scope of the initiative power thereunder (i.e., the reduction or repeal of a local levy) and one or more other substantive provisions that fall outside the scope of the Proposition 218 local initiative power. Mixed initiatives present issues relating to the application of the lower signature requirement under Proposition 218 as well as the need for additional legal authority to pursue a local initiative containing provisions outside the scope of the Proposition 218 local initiative power.

The significantly reduced signature requirement for local initiatives under Proposition 218 only applies to the reduction or repeal of local government levies. Thus, if a local initiative contains one or more provisions outside the scope of the Proposition 218 initiative power, the lower signature requirement would not apply.

The second issue presented with a mixed initiative is the need for legal authority independent of Proposition 218 to pursue a local initiative containing one or more provisions outside the scope of the Proposition 218 local initiative power. If such independent legal authority does not exist, the entire initiative measure can be invalidated.

Because a mixed initiative presents additional and more complex legal issues compared to a pure initiative, it is usually preferable for local voters to pursue a pure initiative measure under Proposition 218.

== Initiative drafting and qualification issues ==
Significant legal and policy issues exist regarding the drafting and qualification of local initiatives under Proposition 218.

Due to the complexity of the procedural requirements applicable to the exercise of the local initiative power in California (which procedures vary depending upon the type of local government involved) as well as the substantive legal requirements applicable to the drafting of a local revenue reduction or repeal initiative measure under Proposition 218, the assistance of legal counsel is typically needed to draft an initiative measure as well as to properly guide the initiative proponents through the legal process.

A local initiative under Proposition 218 can be denied placement on the ballot or subsequently invalidated by the courts if all legal requirements, including procedural requirements applicable to the exercise of the local initiative power, are not completely followed by the initiative proponents. Local governments have generally been hostile to voters exercising the local initiative power under Proposition 218 which is another reason why it is important for the proponents of any such initiative to comply with all applicable legal requirements.

The Howard Jarvis Taxpayers Association has released a general publication to assist voters in repealing or reducing existing city taxes using the local initiative power under Proposition 218.

=== Findings and Declarations ===
Extensive findings and declarations language, with supporting foundations in the official record, are also generally necessary for certain reduction or repeal initiatives involving local government utility fees and charges, especially in situations where California laws may require the local governing body to levy utility fees and charges in sufficient amounts to maintain specified service levels to the community.

If a local initiative measure under Proposition 218 includes extensive findings and declarations relating to the reduction or repeal of a utility fee or charge subject to specified service levels mandated by California law, and if the local initiative measure is subsequently approved by the voters, then the findings and declarations of the people as set forth in the initiative measure should generally control for purposes of determining compliance with legal mandates related to specified utility service levels.

To avoid possible invalidation of a local initiative measure under Proposition 218 providing for the reduction or repeal of a utility fee or charge subject to specified service levels mandated by California law, any findings and declarations in an initiative generally must have a supporting basis. That supporting basis usually comes from documentation in the official record of the utility fee adoption proceedings by the governing body of the local government. Thus, voters contemplating a local initiative measure under Proposition 218 in such instances generally need to include their documentation in the official record of the utility fee adoption proceedings to counter any documentation included in the official record by the governing body of the local government.

=== Initiative Timetable Flexibility ===
Initiative proponents generally need to be flexible in developing their timetable for exercising the local initiative power under Proposition 218. Not all elements applicable to the exercise of the initiative power will necessarily go according to schedule and there will often be delays. In addition, if a local government is hostile to an initiative proposal, delay tactics on the part of the local government can be expected and need to be factored in by initiative proponents.

The actual language of a local initiative measure itself should also be flexible, particularly as it relates to the effective and operative dates of the initiative. Delay tactics by a hostile local government, including legal challenges, can sometimes result in a significant delay in an initiative appearing on the ballot. The language of an initiative needs to be flexible enough to address such scenarios so that if the initiative were to be approved by the voters any resulting delays in ballot qualification will not adversely impact the substantive provisions of the measure.

== Lawsuits involving local Proposition 218 initiatives ==
Local government opposition must generally be assumed by initiative proponents in planning their initiative timetable. It is a common tactic for a hostile local government to file a lawsuit to prevent a local initiative under Proposition 218 from appearing on the ballot. The local government typically alleges that any such initiative would have a major adverse financial impact, and in some cases, state statutory law supposedly precludes local voters from exercising the initiative power under Proposition 218. The timetable for initiative proponents must also be flexible enough to incorporate any likely delays which will result from any legal action by a hostile local government to thwart the exercise of the local initiative power under Proposition 218.

It is now a common tactic for a hostile local government to file a lawsuit against the initiative proponents even before the issuance of the ballot title and summary (which must legally be included on initiative petitions) during the early stages of the initiative process. Such lawsuits have the practical effect of prohibiting the initiative proponents from gathering signatures to place their measure on the ballot which effectively precludes the proponents from exercising the local initiative power under Proposition 218 until at least such time as the local government lawsuit concerning the ballot title and summary has either been resolved by the courts or by the parties. The initiative proponents may need to file a lawsuit against the local government to compel the local government to prepare and issue the ballot title and summary.

Sometimes a local government may refuse to place a local Proposition 218 initiative on the ballot even though the required number of signatures has been obtained and certified. Once a local initiative measure has qualified for the ballot, the responsible local entity or official generally has a mandatory duty to place the initiative on the ballot. If the responsible local entity or official refuses to place the initiative on the ballot, this can force the initiative proponents to file a lawsuit to legally require the local government to place the initiative on the ballot.

A hostile local government is also likely to file a lawsuit against a local Proposition 218 initiative should it be approved by local voters in an election. Postelection lawsuits may also be filed by private interests such as those that may have opposed the initiative during the election campaign. The initiative proponents have to be prepared for any such lawsuits. This also places emphasis on the need for initiative proponents to ensure that their local initiative under Proposition 218 is drafted in compliance with all applicable legal requirements since violation of any provision of law could result in the invalidation of part or even all of a local revenue reduction or repeal initiative.

Those filing lawsuits relating to local initiatives under Proposition 218 also have to be aware of potential liability for attorney fees under the California Anti-SLAPP (Strategic Lawsuit Against Public Participation) Law. Some local governments have successfully used the California Anti-SLAPP Law to force individuals to pay attorney fees incurred by the local government in certain lawsuits.

Even when local government lawsuits seeking to prevent a local initiative under Proposition 218 from appearing on the ballot are unsuccessful, they almost always result in significant delay which is often the real intent of the local government. When such initiatives do eventually appear on the ballot, any previous questionable conduct on the part of the local government during the initiative process, including any applicable lawsuits which also typically result in a significant waste of public funds paying for lawyers, can be a major campaign issue that increases the likelihood of the initiative measure being approved by the voters.

== Validity of local initiative power under Proposition 218 ==
Exercise of the local initiative power under Proposition 218 was generally confirmed and upheld by the California Supreme Court in Bighorn-Desert View Water Agency v. Verjil, 39 Cal. 4th 205 (July 2006). Although the California Supreme Court has yet to more precisely define the limits of the local initiative power under Proposition 218, the California Legislative Analyst has opined that, based on the actual constitutional language, the only limits appear to be those under federal law, such as the federal debt impairment clause.

== Local referendum power not included ==
Proposition 218 only applies to the local initiative power and not to the local referendum power which is a separate power under California law. The referendum is the constitutionally reserved power of the voters to approve or reject laws (or parts of laws) except urgency laws, laws calling elections, and laws providing for tax levies or appropriations for usual current expenses of government. The referendum power issue becomes more significant for local levies that do not require a mandatory election under Proposition 218 prior to their imposition. This is particularly the case concerning property-related fees and charges that are exempt from a mandatory election under Proposition 218 (property-related fees or charges for water, sanitary sewer, or refuse collection services).

In 2020, the California Supreme Court ruled in Wilde v. City of Dunsmuir that the electorate cannot legally use the local referendum power to challenge a local government's resolution setting water rates. In reversing the Court of Appeal which held that the exercise of the local referendum power was legally permissible, the California Supreme Court broadly construed the "tax levies" exception to the referendum power to include water utility rates even though these same rates are not considered "taxes" for purposes of the voter approval requirements under Propositions 218. The reasoning in Wilde also likely applies to other property-related fees or charges under Proposition 218 such as for sewer, stormwater or refuse collection services, but the California Supreme Court did not hold that every local government revenue-raising measure is exempt from the local referendum power. Rather, the holding is limited to utility rates on which local governments depend to provide essential services to their residents.

Following the California Supreme Court decision in Wilde, exercise of the local referendum power is generally no longer an available option regarding local government imposed utility rates. However, the Wilde decision did not impact the scope of the local initiative power under Proposition 218 which remains a constitutionally available option to reduce or repeal local government imposed utility rates.

== Local initiatives after Proposition 218 precondition requirements are satisfied ==
Once Proposition 218 preconditions applicable to a local government levy have been legally satisfied, a local government may generally impose the local levy. Furthermore, once a local levy is actually imposed by a local government, Proposition 218 provides no mechanism to suspend the effective date of the local levy pending a subsequent vote of the electorate.

On the other hand, the local initiative power under Proposition 218 is generally available to reduce or repeal a local government levy that has already been imposed by a local government (i.e., an existing local government levy). The most common situation where exercise of the local initiative power under Proposition 218 is considered following local government compliance with Proposition 218 precondition requirements involves the approval of property-related fees and charges where only the majority protest process (with no election) is involved. This occurs with the approval of local government property-related fees and charges for domestic water, sanitary sewer, or refuse collection services.

If the governing body of a local government is not responsive to the objections of property owners concerning a proposed property-related fee or charge that is exempt from an election, local voters generally have recourse in the subsequent exercise of the local initiative power under Proposition 218. This is especially the case if significant opposition is present but the opposition level is not great enough to reach a majority protest which, if reached, would constitutionally preclude the imposition of the property-related fee or charge.

== Amending or repealing a local Proposition 218 initiative ==
A local initiative under Proposition 218 that has been approved by the voters of a local government may be subsequently amended or repealed by the voters. Under the initiative power in general, an initiative measure may be amended or repealed by a majority vote of the applicable electorate unless the initiative measure specifically allows for amendment or repeal without voter approval.

It is not uncommon for a local government to seek to replace revenues that are lost as a result of passage of an initiative under Proposition 218 that reduces or repeals a local government levy. In many instances, other provisions of Proposition 218 will require a mandatory election for any replacement revenue source. This includes a replacement tax (a new tax or a tax increase) or a replacement property-related fee or charge (a new or increased property-related fee or charge) subject to a mandatory election under Proposition 218.

Where significant controversy often arises is when a reduced or repealed revenue source is not subject to a mandatory election under Proposition 218 in the event a replacement revenue source is pursued by a local government. This occurs primarily in regard to property-related fees and charges exempt from a mandatory election under Proposition 218 (local government fees and charges for domestic water, sanitary sewer, and refuse collection services) and other local fees and charges that are not property-related under Proposition 218 (e.g., groundwater fees). To the extent that a replacement fee or charge would be deemed a “tax” under the provisions of Proposition 26 approved by California voters in 2010, voter approval would be required for that tax under Proposition 218.

=== Initiative Amendment Issues ===
For a replacement revenue source not subject to a mandatory election under Proposition 218, a critical legal issue is whether the imposition of that replacement source would result in an amendment of the reduction or repeal local initiative measure. If an amendment of the reduction or repeal initiative is involved, then majority voter approval would be required for the amendment to become law. In this situation, the voter approval requirement results not from Proposition 218 but rather from the separate legal requirement that the amendment or repeal of an initiative measure generally requires majority voter approval for the amendment or repeal provision to become law.

In some instances, there exists reasonable uncertainty whether a replacement revenue source constitutes an amendment of a successful reduction or repeal initiative under Proposition 218. The governing body of a local government will typically seek to structure a replacement revenue source in such a manner as to avoid the replacement levy being categorized as an initiative amendment, and thereby avoid the voter approval requirement applicable to initiative amendments. On the other hand, the reduction or repeal initiative proponents will generally have a broad interpretation of the types of replacement levies that constitute an amendment of their initiative measure.

The proponents of a local initiative under Proposition 218 to reduce or repeal a local revenue source need to take into consideration the foregoing amendment issue in drafting the provisions of an initiative measure. The initiative generally needs to be drafted in such a manner to make it more difficult for a local government to avoid any potential replacement revenue proposal from being categorized as an initiative amendment which would bypass the voter approval requirement applicable to initiative amendments.

== Initiating a local government revenue source ==
Initiating a local government revenue source occurs when voters pass a local reduction or repeal initiative measure under Proposition 218 thereby making any amendment applicable to the local revenue source contained in the initiative measure subject to voter approval. The voter approval requirement results not directly from Proposition 218 itself but rather from the separate legal requirement that an amendment or repeal of an initiative measure requires voter approval for the amendment or repeal provision to go into effect and become law.

The types of local government revenue sources for which voters might want to initiate include those levies that are generally not subject to voter approval under Proposition 218. Such local levies include property-related fees and charges exempt from a mandatory election under Proposition 218 (property-related fees and charges for domestic water, sanitary sewer, or refuse collection services) as well as local government fees and charges that are not property-related under Proposition 218 and would not be deemed a “tax” under Proposition 26 approved by California voters in 2010.

If voters approve a local initiative that initiates a local government revenue source, voter approval would be subsequently required to increase the revenue that had been reduced by the local initiative under Proposition 218. As an example, suppose voters approved a local revenue initiative under Proposition 218 that reduced by a nominal amount certain water rates charged by a local government. The local government would then need voter approval before it could increase the water rates that had been reduced by the local revenue reduction initiative under Proposition 218.

== Opposition to local Proposition 218 initiatives ==
Local initiatives under Proposition 218 frequently face well organized and funded opposition, especially from local public employee unions and often from the local business community. Some of the most heated political and legal battles under Proposition 218 involve the exercise of the local initiative power to reduce or repeal local government levies.

== Local government informational campaigns in initiative elections ==
Although local governments are prohibited from spending public funds and resources to campaign against local initiatives under Proposition 218, they are allowed to expend public funds to engage in “informational” campaigns that “educate” voters about such initiatives. When questionable or controversial informational campaigns occur by local governments in connection with a local initiative under Proposition 218, often the only practical remedy available to voters is to make such informational campaigns a significant political issue during the election campaign.

The Howard Jarvis Taxpayers Association has released information to assist taxpayers in stopping illegal campaign spending by a local government, including in connection with the exercise of the local initiative power under Proposition 218.

== Availability of local government data ==
It is generally helpful for voters and initiative proponents to have financial data about a local government to help make more informed voting decisions concerning the merits of a local initiative under Proposition 218. Financial data about a local government can be obtained directly from the local government itself. Additional data that can be of value includes public employee salary and benefits data (especially pension and health benefits data), and annual budgetary and financial reports. Local government budget spending priorities, as contained in recent budgetary data, can be especially helpful with general tax reduction or repeal initiatives where local politicians decide how the proceeds from an existing general tax are spent.

Extensive public data sources outside of a local government are also available to voters in connection with local initiatives under Proposition 218. Such data can help provide a supporting basis for pursuing a local reduction or repeal initiative, including a foundation for any factual findings and declarations contained in a local initiative.

== Application of political reform act ==
Campaign reporting requirements under the California Political Reform Act of 1974 usually apply to local initiatives under Proposition 218. This will generally give both the proponents and opponents of such initiative measures an opportunity to find out where the campaign contributions are coming from and the amounts of those campaign contributions. Additional information about the California Political Reform Act of 1974 can be obtained from the California Fair Political Practices Commission.

== Local recall power as an additional tool ==
The recall is the constitutionally reserved power of the voters to remove an elective officer before the term of that officer expires. Although Proposition 218 does not directly affect the recall power, local voters can nonetheless use the local recall power in conjunction with the exercise of the local initiative power under Proposition 218. This is especially the case if one or more members of the local governing body are frustrating the exercise of the local initiative power under Proposition 218 such as by filing a lawsuit against the levy (before and/or after the election), by refusing to place an initiative on the ballot after having received the required number of signatures, or by refusing to comply with an initiative after having been approved by local voters.

Successful exercise of the recall power only provides for the removal of elective officers and does not by itself alter any prior decisions made by the governing body of the local government such as the approval of a controversial utility fee increase. The local initiative power under Proposition 218 is designed to address such matters involving prior decisions made by the governing body of the local government relating to the approval of controversial local levies.

The California Secretary of State has released a publication on the procedures for recalling local elected officials in California.

=== Holding Politicians Accountable During the Next Election ===
Even if a recall is not actually pursued, the approval of one or more controversial levies by local elected officials is a matter for which those elected officials can be held politically accountable during subsequent elections for members of the governing body. This is especially the case for controversial local levies that are not subject to a constitutionally required election under Proposition 218 such as local agency utility fees and charges for domestic water or sanitary sewer services. If an impacted local politician decides to run for another term of office, then the prior approval of one or more controversial local levies can become a significant campaign issue during the upcoming election.
