= 1996 California Proposition 218 =

Adopted initiative constitutional amendment on taxation

- Ratified: November 5, 1996
- Date effective: November 6, 1996; 30 years ago
- Author(s): Jonathan Coupal; Jack Cohen
- Subject: California local and regional government finance and taxation
- Purpose: Constitutional follow-up to 1978 California Proposition 13; Added Article XIII C and Article XIII D to the California Constitution

Proposition 218 is an adopted initiative constitutional amendment which revolutionized local and regional government finance and taxation in California. Named the "Right to Vote on Taxes Act," it was sponsored by the Howard Jarvis Taxpayers Association as a constitutional follow-up to the landmark property tax reduction initiative constitutional amendment, Proposition 13, approved in June 1978. Proposition 218 was approved and adopted by California voters during the November 5, 1996, statewide general election.

Proposition 218 amended the California Constitution by adding Article XIII C and Article XIII D. Article XIII C added constitutional voter approval requirements for all local government taxes which previously did not exist. Also included in Article XIII C is a provision significantly expanding the reserved constitutional local initiative power by voters to reduce or repeal any local government tax, assessment, fee or charge, and this constitutional reservation is also subject to a significantly reduced signature requirement making ballot qualification easier. Article XIII D added constitutional assessment and property-related fee reforms applicable to all local governments. This includes numerous additional requirements for special benefit assessments on real property and for property-related fees and charges, such as various utility fees imposed by local governments which are no longer allowed to exceed the cost of providing the utility service to a customer.

The California Senate Office of Research listed Proposition 218 as one of the most significant laws of the 20th century in California. Following the November 1996 election, a high level official from the California State Association of Counties wrote that Proposition 218 "profoundly changes the way California is governed" and "may prove to be the most revolutionary act in the history of California." Proposition 218 was also the first successful initiative constitutional amendment in California history to add more than one article to the California Constitution as well as to alter the scope of the constitutional initiative power. The measure was drafted by constitutional attorneys Jonathan Coupal and Jack Cohen.

== General information ==
The official legal title of Proposition 218 was: "Voter Approval for Local Government Taxes. Limitations on Fees, Assessments, and Charges. Initiative Constitutional Amendment."

The Findings and Declarations contained in Proposition 218 stated: "The people of the State of California hereby find and declare that Proposition 13 was intended to provide effective tax relief and to require voter approval of tax increases. However, local governments have subjected taxpayers to excessive tax, assessment, fee and charge increases that not only frustrate the purposes of voter approval for tax increases, but also threaten the economic security of all Californians and the California economy itself. This measure protects taxpayers by limiting the methods by which local governments exact revenue from taxpayers without their consent."

Proposition 218 has been part of the California Constitution for 30 years.

== Conditions leading to Proposition 218 ==
The special assessment and property-related fee reforms contained in Proposition 218 were a response to local government taxation practices in the 1980s and 1990s following the passage of Proposition 13. After Proposition 13 passed in 1978, local governments sought methods to raise additional revenues while avoiding the two-thirds voter approval requirement for special taxes under Proposition 13.

Proposition 218 supporters claimed that local governments found a particularly pernicious way to raise additional revenues and avoid the Proposition 13 two-thirds local voter approval requirement for taxes by using special benefit assessment districts. Special assessments on real property became a vehicle of choice for local politicians seeking to avoid difficult government spending decisions.

The property assessment loophole floodgates opened wide following a controversial 1992 California Supreme Court decision (known as the Knox case) holding that the two-thirds voter approval requirement for local special taxes under Proposition 13 did not apply to special benefit assessments on real property.

As a result of the Knox decision, local governments could legally impose special assessments on real property for a wide range of purposes without voter approval. Special assessments effectively became unrestricted property tax increases appearing on the property tax bills of millions of California property owners.

Once the special assessment loophole following the Knox decision was created by the courts, one lawyer working with local government politicians wrote that property assessments in California "are now limited only by the limits of human imagination." Some of the more imaginative special assessments imposed by local governments included: (1) A "view tax" in southern California – the better the view of the ocean the property owner had, the more the owner paid; (2) In northern California, property owners 27 miles away from a park were assessed because their property allegedly specially benefited from that park.

Controversial property-related fees and charges also became a significant problem following the passage of Proposition 13, as many local governments labeled taxes as "fees" or "charges" and imposed these levies without voter approval. For example, the California Supreme Court ruled that a local municipal utility, such as a city providing domestic water service, is entitled to a reasonable "return on investment" (otherwise referred to as "profit"). As a result, a local municipal utility could legally overcharge its customers in excess of the cost of providing the utility service to its customers, and then transfer the excess revenues to the general fund of the local agency to be spent at the discretion of local politicians just like an unrestricted tax. All this could generally be done without voter approval.

== Election campaign ==
Proposition 218 was considered a sleeper measure by the media as local governments were legally prohibited from using public funds and other resources to campaign against it, and because greater media attention had been given to the Proposition 209 ban on affirmative action and the Proposition 215 medical marijuana initiative measures which also appeared on the same election ballot.

Proposition 218 was initially estimated to cost local governments in California at least $100 million per year with long-term cost estimates being much greater in the many billions of dollars per year, and Moody's Investors Service warned the initiative measure would cause "significantly declining credit quality." The credit ratings issue became so heated during the Proposition 218 election campaign that the California State Treasurer, in an effort to calm the municipal bond market, took the extraordinary step of warning measure opponents against exaggerating the possible negative impacts on local government credit ratings and bond issuances when discussing Proposition 218.

Like Proposition 13 in 1978, Proposition 218 was also opposed by the vast majority of prominent newspapers and the political establishment in California. Opposition to Proposition 218 included public employee unions, local governments, local government interest organizations, environmental interest groups, public education interest groups, and private business firms that underwrite municipal bonds.

Of the total campaign contributions received against Proposition 218, 74% came from public employee unions, and those interests contributing $10,000 or more represented 91% of the total contributions received by the Proposition 218 opposition campaign.

Measure opponents often warned of dire consequences over Proposition 218's approval, including major job losses in Silicon Valley, the shuttering of many parks, senior centers, and other public buildings, and be threats to fire safety.

Supporters of Proposition 218 focused on the ability for residents to vote on local government taxes. Proposition 218 supporters also urged voters to review their property tax bill, arguing that it would confirm the growing list of property-related fees, charges and special assessments imposed by local governments without voter approval.

=== Election results ===
Proposition 218 passed with 56.55% support statewide, representing a margin of victory of 13.1 percentage points.

Results by county: Yes: 50–60%; 60–70%; 70–80%; No: 50–60%; 60–70%

California Proposition 218 (1996)
Choice	Votes	%
Yes	5,202,429	56.55
No	3,996,702	43.45
Total	9,199,131	100.00
Source: California Secretary of State, Statement of Vote November 5, 1996 General Election, p. xiii.

Proposition 218 passed in 67 of the 80 State Assembly Districts and in 34 of the 40 State Senate Districts in California (based on 2011 redistricting).

Proposition 218's victory was unusual in that it was behind in the majority of polls, with only 36% of likely voters reported as being in support in the final Field Poll. (Note: It is unclear what percentage in the survey were opposed or undecided.)

== Article XIII C – Local government taxes ==
Section 3 of Proposition 218 added Article XIII C to the California Constitution.

Section 1 of Article XIII C contains definitions applicable to the article. Section 1 also defines the types of taxes local governments may levy. A "general tax" is defined as any tax imposed for general governmental purposes. A "special tax" is defined as any tax imposed for specific purposes, including a tax imposed for specific purposes which is placed into a general fund. The general versus special tax distinction existed in California prior to Proposition 218, but Proposition 218 contains a broader definition of "special tax" as also including taxes imposed for specific purposes that are placed into a general fund.

Section 1 definitions also include the term "local government" setting forth the various public entities subject to the article. The term "local government" for purposes of Proposition 218 is broadly defined to counter a previously narrow interpretation given by the California Supreme Court under Proposition 13 which created loopholes allowing some local governments to circumvent constitutional two-thirds voter approval requirements for local taxes. Government entities subject to Proposition 218 provisions are local and regional governments, including counties, cities, a city and county, school districts, community college districts, public authorities, joint powers agencies, and special districts such as water or fire districts. The "local government" definition also expressly states that it includes charter cities having a local charter (similar to a local constitution) as their primary source of government powers and authority.

If a local government tax is legally dedicated for one or more specific purposes it is a special tax. Proposition 218 also requires certain taxes relating to real property (e.g., parcel taxes) be levied as special taxes. Proposition 218 further specifies that many local governments, including school districts, do not have the power to levy general taxes which means that such local governments (known as special purpose districts or agencies) can only legally levy special taxes.

To the extent a local government has the power to levy a general tax and that a particular tax is not required to be levied as a special tax, a tax is general only when its revenues are placed into the general fund of the local government and are available for expenditure for any and all governmental purposes.

=== Tax definition and Proposition 26 (2010) ===
During the November 2010 General Election, California voters approved Proposition 26 which, in part, added a broad constitutional definition of "tax" for purposes of Proposition 218. Proposition 218 did not include a specific constitutional definition of "tax," but California courts, prior to the passage of Proposition 26 in 2010, generally broadly construed what constitutes a "tax" such as concluding that a 911 "fee" was really a special tax subject to two-thirds voter approval.

If a local government levy, charge or exaction is a "tax" under the Proposition 26 constitutional definition, then voter approval is required under Proposition 218 if that tax is a new tax, an increased tax, or a tax extension. A local government levy that is not a tax under Proposition 26 may nonetheless be subject to Proposition 218 constitutional provisions under Article XIII D if the levy is either a special assessment on real property or a property-related fee or charge.

Local government fees and charges that are neither taxes under Proposition 26 nor subject to Article XIII D are generally subject to reduction or repeal using the local initiative power under Proposition 218, including the significantly reduced signature requirement thereunder. This gives local voters a legislative remedy to require an election concerning a nontax levy approved by a local government where an election is not legally required by Proposition 218 or any other provision of law.

One example is a fee on the extraction of groundwater. In 2017, the California Supreme Court held that a fee imposed upon persons on the extraction of groundwater is no longer a property-related fee under Proposition 218, although such fees remain subject to Proposition 26 provisions defining when a local levy is a tax.

=== Voter approval requirements and related provisions for local taxes ===
Section 2 of Article XIII C contains the voter approval requirements for local government taxes. Under Proposition 218, every local government tax is either a general tax or a special tax. Proposition 218 does not allow a local tax to be a hybrid tax. The type of tax a local government levies (whether general or special) is legally important because it determines the applicable voter approval requirement.

Special purpose districts or agencies, including school districts, have no power to levy general taxes and can only impose special taxes. This restriction is based on prior judicial interpretations of Proposition 13 which Proposition 218 constitutionalized. Generally, only a city or a county has the power to levy a majority vote general tax under Proposition 218.

The voter approval requirement under Proposition 218 was upheld by a California appellate court in 1998 as not constituting an unconstitutional referendum.

The voter approval requirement for taxes under Proposition 218 is triggered when a local government "imposes," "extends," or "increases" a tax. What constitutes a tax "increase" under Proposition 218 was broadly construed by a California appellate court in 2007. The applicable electorate for conducting a local tax election is generally the registered voters of the local government.

==== New taxes ====
New local government taxes require voter approval under Proposition 218. The term "imposed" for purposes of triggering the voter approval requirement under Proposition 218 typically refers to the first enactment of a tax.

==== Tax increase ====
When local governments increase a local tax, voter approval is required under Proposition 218. The California Legislature adopted a statute interpreting the term "increase" for purposes of Proposition 218 although the courts have the final say in interpreting the applicable constitutional language.

A tax is "increased" under Proposition 218 when a local government makes a decision that does any of the following: (1) increases any applicable rate used to calculate the tax; or (2) revises the methodology by which the tax is calculated, if that revision results in an increased amount being levied on any person or parcel of property. The term "methodology" refers to a mathematical equation for calculating taxes that is officially sanctioned by a local government. In practical terms, a tax is "increased" under Proposition 218 if the math behind it is altered so that either a larger tax rate or a larger tax base is part of the calculation.

An example application of the foregoing to an unresolved legal issue is when utility rates are increased in local governments having a related utility users tax. A utility rate increase can also result in increased utility user tax payments and revenues for the benefit of the local government. A properly levied utility rate increase can be applied for purposes of generating increased utility revenues, but if those increased utility rates are also applied for purposes of generating increased utility user tax revenues, that might be a tax "increase" and trigger the voter approval requirement under Proposition 218.

==== Tax extension ====
When a local government "extends" a local tax, voter approval is required under Proposition 218. The California Legislature adopted a statute narrowly interpreting the term "extended" for purposes of the tax provisions of Proposition 218.

A tax is "extended" for purposes of Proposition 218 when, as applied to an existing tax, a local government extends the stated effective period for the tax, including, but not limited to, amendment or removal of a sunset provision or expiration date. The term "extend" as applied to a tax has been interpreted not to apply to geographic areas in certain annexation proceedings. While expanding the geographic area subject to a tax may not constitute an "extension," it may constitute a tax "increase" and thereby require voter approval under Proposition 218 on that basis.

==== Tax modernization ====
Some local governments have combined in the same ballot measure a minor tax reduction (which by itself generally does not require voter approval) with a tax base expansion that does generally require voter approval under Proposition 218 because it constitutes a tax increase. This is often done with utility user tax "modernization" measures with the nominal tax rate reduction component serving to make the tax more politically attractive to voters. When such a ballot measure is presented to voters, the full text of the measure should be reviewed so that voters will be more fully informed about the specifics of the tax proposal, particularly as it relates to any expansion of the tax base which is the legal reason why voter approval is required.

Controversy also exists whether utility user tax "modernization" measures permit local governments to impose taxes on online video streaming services. Concerning previously voter approved tax "modernization" measures, the voters may have unknowingly authorized the imposition of taxes on online video streaming services. This places greater emphasis on the need for voters to carefully review the text of any tax modernization measure to determine whether taxes on online video streaming services would be authorized. To the extent that previously approved tax modernization measures are interpreted to include taxes on online video streaming services, voters have an available remedy using the local initiative power under Proposition 218 to reduce or repeal any tax on online video streaming services.

==== General tax vote requirement ====
Under Article XIII C, a local government may not impose, extend, or increase any general tax unless that tax is first submitted to the electorate and approved by a majority vote. Proposition 218 requires that general tax elections be consolidated with a regularly scheduled general election for members of the governing body of the local government, except in cases of an emergency declared by a unanimous vote of the governing body. The California Supreme Court construed the election consolidation requirement to not apply when a general tax is proposed by the voters exercising the local initiative power.

Some local governments, in an effort to accelerate the election date for a general tax measure, have invoked the emergency exception applicable to the election consolidation requirement under questionable circumstances. When this occurs, often the only practical remedy available to voters is to make the emergency exception controversy a political issue during the election campaign, especially since significant additional special election costs are frequently incurred as a result of invoking the emergency exception.

Since general taxes are not legally dedicated for specific purposes, they can be spent at the complete discretion of local politicians, including on public employee salaries and benefits.

Some local governments in an effort to evade the two-thirds voter approval requirement for special taxes under Proposition 218 may express legally nonbinding intent to spend general tax proceeds for one or more specific purposes. This may be done in several forms such as the adoption of intent language before the tax election date, the formation of an advisory committee relating to the expenditure of the tax proceeds, or by placing a companion advisory measure on the same election ballot. Use of a companion advisory measure associated with an unrestricted local tax measure was found by one California appellate court to be a general tax notwithstanding the expanded special tax definition under Proposition 218.

Controversial general tax measures intended for one or more specific purposes also have the effect of circumventing California accountability laws designed to protect taxpayers by ensuring that local government taxes imposed for specific purposes are actually spent as set forth in the ballot measure.

Local governments also sometimes refer to a general tax as a "vital services" tax in order to make the tax more politically attractive to voters. A legitimate general tax under Proposition 218 can be spent on public services or programs that are not deemed "vital" by a local government. This can include controversial purposes such as financing high public employee salaries and benefits or paying for excessive public employee pension obligations.

General tax proceeds placed into the general fund of a local government may generally not be subsequently pledged to repay bonded indebtedness. A general tax must also be available for expenditure for any and all governmental purposes in order to remain a valid general tax.

When a controversial general tax measure is presented by a local government, often the only practical remedy available to voters is to make the controversial tax measure a political issue during the election campaign. The Howard Jarvis Taxpayers Association has published "taxpayer tools" to assist taxpayers in such matters.

==== Special tax vote requirement ====
A local government may not impose, extend, or increase any special tax unless that tax is submitted to the electorate and approved by a two-thirds vote. Proposition 218 contains an additional requirement that any tax assessed upon a parcel of real property or upon any person as an incident of real property ownership must be a special tax subject to two-thirds voter approval. This means all parcel taxes (taxes on real property not based on assessed value) must be levied as special taxes subject to two-thirds voter approval.

==== Application of Proposition 218 to local tax initiatives (2017 Upland decision) ====
In California Cannabis Coalition v. City of Upland, 3 Cal. 5th 924 (August 2017), the California Supreme Court in a controversial 5–2 split decision held that the election consolidation requirement for general taxes under Proposition 218 does not apply to a local tax initiative placed on the ballot by the electorate exercising the local initiative power.

The Upland decision raised legal questions whether the voter approval requirements for taxes under Proposition 218 applied to local tax initiatives placed on the ballot by the electorate exercising the local initiative power. However, the case did not involve application of constitutional voter approval requirements to local tax initiatives, but rather involved a narrow election timing issue (the election consolidation requirement) applicable only to general taxes which under Proposition 218 may only be levied by cities or counties.

Although the Upland decision was narrow, it has been criticized because in granting deference to the local initiative power "the court erred in the opposite direction by adopting an overly narrow reading of Proposition 218." Another article argued that "The court's decision represents a ridiculously narrow vision of what was intended by Proposition 218."

The Upland decision applied only to the election consolidation requirement for general taxes under Proposition 218. However, in Altadena Library District v. Bloodgood, 192 Cal. App. 3d 585 (June 1987) the two-thirds voter approval requirement for special taxes under Proposition 13, an older constitutional taxpayer protection law approved in 1978, was applied to a local initiative special tax increase proposed by the electorate exercising the local initiative power. The Upland decision did not disapprove or question the 1987 Altadena Library District appellate court decision.

Following the Upland decision, multiple intermediate appellate court decisions applied Upland in holding that the two-thirds voter approval requirements for special taxes under Propositions 13 and 218 do not apply to local tax initiatives placed on the ballot by the electorate exercising the initiative power. As of 2026, the California Supreme Court had not clarified whether the Upland decision applies to the voter approval requirements under Propositions 13 and 218, or otherwise resolved the existing conflict with the 1987 Altadena Library District appellate decision relating to Proposition 13.

===== Local initiative power to reduce or repeal majority vote initiative special taxes =====
Following the Upland decision, to the extent a local special tax increase initiative does not meet the two-thirds voter approval requirement for special taxes under Propositions 13 and/or 218, as a legislative remedy that tax may be reduced or repealed by the local electorate using the local initiative power under Proposition 218, including the significantly reduced signature requirement thereunder.

===== 2026 California Proposition 43 =====
Proposition 43, a proposed constitutional amendment on the November 2026 ballot in California, would expand the two-thirds voter approval requirements for special taxes under Propositions 13 and 218 to local tax initiatives placed on the ballot by initiative. This would restore the effective legal situation before the Upland decision and following cases.

==== Legal authority to impose local taxes ====
Proposition 218 does not legally authorize any local government to impose any tax. The legal authority to levy a local government tax must come from an independent legal source such as a statute enacted by the California Legislature, and may be subject to additional statutory restrictions. The California Supreme Court has held that a local government must comply with any applicable statutory requirements as well as the constitutional requirements under Proposition 218.

An example of an additional statutory restriction is that many parcel taxes must be applied uniformly to all taxpayers or real property.

==== Temporary vs. permanent taxes ====
Under Proposition 218, taxes proposed by a local government may either be temporary or permanent. If a tax is temporary, voter approval is required to extend a tax beyond its expiration date. Permanent local government taxes continue for an indefinite period of time. However, permanent taxes can generally be reduced or repealed by either subsequent action of the local governing body or by the voters exercising the local initiative power under Proposition 218.

Historically, some ballot questions did not expressly specify the duration of a tax, including if a proposed tax would be permanent. However, effective January 1, 2018, if a proposed local government measure imposes a tax or raises the rate of a tax, the ballot must specify the duration of the tax to be levied.

== Initiative power to reduce or repeal local government levies ==
For more detailed information about the local initiative power reserved under California Proposition 218 to reduce or repeal local taxes, assessments, fees and charges, see California Proposition 218 (1996) Local Initiative Power.

One of the most significant provisions of Proposition 218 constitutionally reserves to local voters the exercise of the initiative power to reduce or repeal any local tax, assessment, fee or charge. The local initiative power under Proposition 218 is an important tool available to voters, especially when local politicians are not responsive to their constituents in matters relating to local taxes, assessments, fees and charges. The specific constitutional language applicable to the reserved local initiative power under Proposition 218 states:

SEC. 3. Initiative Power for Local Taxes, Assessments, Fees and Charges. Notwithstanding any other provision of this Constitution, including, but not limited to, Sections 8 and 9 of Article II, the initiative power shall not be prohibited or otherwise limited in matters of reducing or repealing any local tax, assessment, fee or charge. The power of initiative to affect local taxes, assessments, fees and charges shall be applicable to all local governments and neither the Legislature nor any local government charter shall impose a signature requirement higher than that applicable to statewide statutory initiatives.

The reserved local initiative power under Proposition 218 is also subject to a significantly reduced signature requirement which cannot legally exceed the requirement applicable to statewide statutory initiatives. The specific maximum signature requirement under Proposition 218 is five percent (5%) of the votes for all candidates for Governor at the last gubernatorial election within the territory of the local government.

The local initiative power under Proposition 218 can be used to reduce or repeal local taxes like utility user taxes, sales taxes, business taxes, parcel taxes, and also to reduce or repeal local government fees and charges such as stormwater fees, groundwater fees, public ambulance/paramedic fees, public park/sports fees, public parking fees, or local government utility fees and charges for water (including drought fees and surcharges), sewer, or refuse collection services.

Exercise of the local initiative power under Proposition 218 was unanimously confirmed and upheld by the California Supreme Court in Bighorn-Desert View Water Agency v. Verjil, 39 Cal. 4th 205 (July 2006). The California Legislative Analyst's Office stated that, based on the actual constitutional language of the initiative power provision, the only limits appear to be those under federal law. However, the scope of the local initiative power under Proposition 218 has yet to be fully defined by the California Supreme Court.

== Article XIII D – Assessment and property-related fee reforms ==
Section 4 of Proposition 218 added Article XIII D to the California Constitution. Article XIII D relates to special assessments on real property and property-related fees and charges. Section 1 of Article XIII D specifies that its provisions apply to all special assessments and property-related fees and charges regardless of whether such levies are imposed pursuant to state statute or local charter authority.

Section 1 further specifies that nothing in Proposition 218 provides any new authority to any local government to impose any tax, special assessment, or property-related fee or charge. This means that the legal authority to impose a local tax, special assessment, or property-related fee or charge must come from an independent legal source such as a state statute or local city charter authority.

Section 1 also specifies two types of laws that are not affected by Proposition 218. First, existing laws relating to the imposition of fees or charges as a condition of property development (e.g., developer fees). Second, existing laws relating to the imposition of timber yield taxes. Under the express language of Proposition 218, the foregoing exceptions are limited to laws existing at the time Proposition 218 became law.

=== Constitutional definitions ===
Section 2 of Article XIII D contains definitions applicable to the article. A summary of the more significant definitions follows.

The term "agency" sets forth the public entities subject to the article. An "agency" in Article XIII D incorporates the same broad definition of "local government" used in Article XIII C. As a result, if a public entity is a "local government" under Article XIII C it is an "agency" under Article XIII D.

The term "assessment" is defined as "any levy or charge upon real property by an agency for a special benefit conferred upon the real property." If a levy or charge is an "assessment," it is subject to the procedures and requirements applicable to assessments in Article XIII D.

Proposition 218 maintains the traditional requirement that a special assessment must specially benefit the assessed property. However, a key reform under Proposition 218 is that it significantly tightens what constitutes a "special benefit" for purposes of levying a lawful special assessment.

Under Proposition 218, a "special benefit" means "a particular and distinct benefit over and above general benefits conferred on real property locate in the district or to the public at large. General enhancement of property value does not constitute 'special benefit.'" The California Supreme Court unanimously confirmed and upheld the tighter "special benefit" definition in interpreting the term to mean that a special benefit must affect an assessed parcel in a way that is particular and distinct from its effect on other parcels, and that real property in general and the public at large do not share.

==== Property-related fee or charge ====
Proposition 218 created a new type of fee or charge known as a property-related fee or charge. Whether a fee or charge is "property-related" is legally significant because if a fee or charge is "property-related," it is subject to the procedures and requirements applicable to such levies in Article XIII D. The detailed procedures and requirements for property-related fees or charges are contained in Section 6 of Article XIII D.

A "property-related" fee or charge is "any levy other than an ad valorem tax, a special tax, or an assessment, imposed by an agency upon a parcel or upon a person as an incident of property ownership, including a user fee or charge for a property-related service." A "property-related service" is defined as "a public service having a direct relationship to property ownership."

Initially, the California Supreme Court in 2001 narrowly interpreted what constitutes a "property-related" fee or charge in concluding that a residential rental inspection fee was not "property-related."

In 2002, a California appellate court held that an in-lieu franchise fee for water, sewer, and refuse collection services was a "property-related" fee subject to Article XIII D. Also in 2002, another California appellate court held that a stormwater drainage fee imposed on developed parcels was a "property-related" fee subject Article XIII D.

In 2004, the California Supreme Court held that a fire suppression fee imposed as a condition for making a new connection to a water system was not a "property-related" fee because the fee was not imposed by virtue of property ownership, but instead was imposed as an incident of the voluntary act of the property owner applying for a water service connection.

In 2005, a California appellate court held that a fee in lieu of property taxes assessed upon municipal utility departments providing water, sewer, and solid waste collection services was a "property-related" fee.

In 2006, the California Supreme Court definitively held that a utility charge imposed by an agency for ongoing water delivery, including a consumption based utility charge, was a "property-related" fee. In reaching this conclusion about consumption based utility charges, the court relied on the "user fee or charge for a property-related service" component of the constitutional definition. Based on the court's reasoning, fees and charges for ongoing sewer and refuse collection services are also "property-related."

In 2017, the California Supreme Court held that a fee imposed upon persons on the extraction of groundwater was generally no longer a property-related fee under Proposition 218. The 2017 California Supreme Court decision disapproved two previous Court of Appeal published decisions holding that a fee on the extraction of groundwater was a property-related fee under Proposition 218. This was the first time the California Supreme Court disapproved a prior published Court of Appeal decision with the resulting effect of taking away Proposition 218 constitutional rights and protections previously recognized by a California appellate court.

Although fees imposed upon persons on the extraction of groundwater are generally no longer a property-related fee under Proposition 218, such levies may still be subject to local voter approval as a tax under Proposition 26 which California voters approved in 2010. However, groundwater fees imposed upon parcels of property should still be subject to Proposition 218. Furthermore, some groundwater fees may be subject to Proposition 218 compliance as a result of independent statutory requirements. For example, fees on the extraction of groundwater imposed by a groundwater sustainability agency are statutorily required to be adopted in accordance with applicable constitutional provisions of Proposition 218.

Fees on the extraction of groundwater are also generally subject to reduction or repeal using the local initiative power under Proposition 218, including the significantly reduced signature requirement thereunder. The local initiative power under Proposition 218 has been used before to repeal a local groundwater fee.

=== Proposition 218 levy limitations ===
Section 3 of Article XIII D provides that no tax, assessment, or property-related fee or charge shall be assessed by any agency upon any parcel of property or upon any person as an incident of property ownership except: (1) constitutionally permitted property taxes based on the assessed value of the property; (2) special taxes receiving a two-thirds vote under Proposition 13; (3) assessments on real property as provided by Article XIII D; and (4) property-related fees or charges for property-related services as provided by Article XIII D.

The preceding requirement generally means that all parcel taxes must be levied as special taxes subject to two-thirds voter approval. The preceding requirement also generally means that property-related fees or charges may only be imposed for property-related services.

A tax imposed on the owners of wholesale liquid fuel storage facilities based solely on the storage capacity of the facilities' tanks, regardless of whether the tanks are used or any fuel is stored in them, was found by a California appellate court to be subject to the constitutional restrictions under Section 3 of Article XIII D.

The courts have yet to fully determine what taxes (e.g., certain utility user taxes) imposed upon a "person as an incident of property ownership," thereby requiring that tax to be a special tax subject to two-thirds voter approval.

Section 3 of Article XIII D also contains an exemption that for purposes of Article XIII D only, fees and charges for electrical or gas service are not property-related fees or charges imposed as an incident of property ownership. This means that electrical or gas service fees and charges imposed by local agencies are not subject to the procedures and requirements applicable to property-related fees or charges, including the proportional cost of service requirement.

The scope of the exemption for electrical or gas service fees and charges only applies to Article XIII D. Depending upon the specific circumstances, electrical or gas service fees and charges imposed by a local agency may constitute a "tax" subject to voter approval under Article XIII C, as amended by Proposition 26 in 2010.

==== Landmark 2008 Silicon Valley Taxpayers Supreme Court case ====
Silicon Valley Taxpayers' Association, Inc. v. Santa Clara County Open Space Authority
- Supreme Court of California

Argued May 6, 2008 Decided July 14, 2008
- Full case name: Silicon Valley Taxpayers' Association, Inc. v. Santa Clara County Open Space Authority
- Citation(s): 44 Cal. 4th 431; 187 P. 3d 37; 79 Cal. Rptr. 3d 312; 38 Envtl. L. Rep. 20174

Case history
- Prior history: 30 Cal. Rptr. 3d 853; Cal. App. 6th Dist. July 6, 2005; Decision Reversed

Case opinions
- Majority: Chin, joined by George, Kennard, Baxter, Werdegar, Moreno, Corrigan

Laws applied
- Cal. Const., art. XIII D (Proposition 218); Landmark Decision

The detailed assessment reforms contained in Proposition 218 were unanimously upheld by the California Supreme Court in Silicon Valley Taxpayers' Association, Inc. v. Santa Clara County Open Space Authority, 44 Cal. 4th 431 (July 2008).

The Silicon Valley Taxpayers case is one of the most important and significant taxpayer protection cases in a generation, and is listed as one of the most important and influential decisions in the history of the California Supreme Court, in large part because of the Court’s holding on the standard of review issue. This issue addresses the level of deference a court will ordinarily give a government agency in reviewing its legislative actions. The extent of deference given by the courts has a major bearing on the outcome of a lawsuit.

Before Proposition 218 became law, in a legal challenge involving an assessment the courts reviewed the actions of a local agency under a highly deferential standard of review. Under this highly deferential standard, courts presumed an assessment was valid and the person challenging the assessment had to show that the record before the local agency clearly did not support the determinations of special benefit and proportionality.

The legal basis for the historical deferential standard of review was that levying an assessment takes place as a result of a legislative process. As a result, the constitutional separation of powers doctrine requires a more deferential standard of review by the courts. Property owners rarely won assessment lawsuits before Proposition 218. Since it was difficult to win a lawsuit before Proposition 218, lawyers were candidly advised not to bother even trying to challenge an assessment in court.

The constitutional status of the assessment requirements under Proposition 218 altered the standard of review analysis. Proposition 218 requirements for assessments are contained in constitutional provisions of dignity at least equal to the constitutional separation of powers provision. Before Proposition 218, assessment laws were generally statutory, and the constitutional separation of powers doctrine served as a foundation for a more deferential standard of review. However, after Proposition 218 became law, an assessment's validity became a constitutional question.

Relying on various provisions of Proposition 218, including the burden of demonstration provision for assessments, and language in the Proposition 218 ballot pamphlet, the California Supreme Court held that because Proposition 218's purpose was to limit government's power to exact revenue and to curtail the deference that had been traditionally accorded legislative enactments on assessments, a more rigorous standard of review was warranted. Separation of powers no longer justified allowing a local agency to usurp the judicial function of interpreting and applying the constitutional provisions that now govern assessments under Proposition 218.

Under the new standard adopted in the Silicon Valley Taxpayers case, California courts must exercise their independent judgment in reviewing whether an assessment violates Proposition 218. This new standard makes it significantly easier for taxpayers to win lawsuits challenging the validity of assessments under Proposition 218.

The California Supreme Court also stated that under Proposition 218 all legislation must be subordinate to its constitutional provisions, and in furtherance of its purpose, and must not narrow or embarrass the measure. As a result, when government, whether state or local, acts in a legislative capacity it cannot exercise its discretion in a way that violates Proposition 218 or undermines its effect. Thus, the California Legislature cannot enact statutes that narrow or undermine Proposition 218.

The Silicon Valley Taxpayers case profoundly changed the legal environment in California relating to constitutional taxpayer protections. As a California Law Review article noted following the Silicon Valley Taxpayers decision: "[T]he California Supreme Court's opinion in Silicon Valley elevates fiscal limitations to the same level as core California constitutional issues." This represented a watershed change in judicial interpretation compared to the historical interpretation of constitutional taxpayer protections in California, especially under Proposition 13, that generally resulted in a narrow construction of constitutional taxpayer protections that limited their scope, application, and impact.

Appellate counsel who represented taxpayers before the California Supreme Court in the landmark Silicon Valley Taxpayers case included Tony Tanke and Jack Cohen. The successful equal dignity argument applicable to the standard of review issue was developed by constitutional attorney Jack Cohen.

==== Local initiative power to reduce or repeal approved assessments ====
After approval of an assessment, the local initiative power under Proposition 218 can generally be used to reduce or repeal that assessment. This includes the significantly reduced signature requirement thereunder.

An example where such an initiative may be used involves inequities that occasionally occur from the weighted ballot requirement for assessments, particularly in assessment districts containing a large number of publicly owned parcels. An assessment district consisting of residential parcels paying lower assessments and a significant number of larger parcels paying higher assessments, such as large publicly owned or commercial parcels, can sometimes result in an assessment being approved under weighted voting even though a majority of the residential property owners opposed the assessment. A local initiative to reduce or repeal the assessment is an available remedy to address such an inequity. Should an assessment reduction or repeal initiative qualify for the ballot, the election would be by the registered voters and the ballots would not be weighted.

=== Property-related fees and charges – procedures and requirements ===
Section 6 of Article XIII D contains the detailed procedures and requirements for property-related fees and charges. These provisions are designed to ensure that any property-related fee or charge levied by a local agency is a legitimate fee or charge and not an unlawful tax imposed without voter approval.

The property-related fee and charge provisions only apply if a fee or charge is "property-related" under the constitutional definition contained in Proposition 218. Some property-related fees or charges are levied upon parcels and appear on the annual property tax bill sent to property owners while other property-related fees or charges are levied upon persons and may be paid by a tenant instead of the property owner.

If a fee or charge is not "property-related" under Proposition 218, it may be subject to voter approval as a "tax" under Proposition 26 (2010). Proposition 26 amended Proposition 218 by adding a broad constitutional definition of a "tax" for purposes of determining the scope of levies subject to the voter approval requirement for local taxes under Proposition 218.

Property-related fees or charges may only be levied for "property-related services." A "property-related service" is a public service having a direct relationship to property ownership. Some of the more common property-related fees or charges levied by local agencies include utility fees for ongoing domestic water, sanitary sewer, refuse collection services, stormwater fees, and flood control fees. Groundwater augmentation fees imposed upon persons are generally no longer property-related fees or charges under Proposition 218, but rather are subject to the less stringent constitutional protections under Proposition 26 (2010).

For purposes of the property-related fee and charge provisions of Proposition 218, "property ownership" includes tenancies of real property where tenants are directly liable to pay the property-related fee or charge in question. Thus, if a tenant is directly liable to pay a property-related fee or charge, that tenant is also regarded as a "property owner" for purposes of the procedures and requirements applicable to property-related fees and charges, including entitlement to notice and the right to protest.

==== Triggering events for property-related fee or charge provisions ====
The type of property-related service involved as well as whether the property-related fee or charge is new, increased, or already existing determines to what extent a levy is subject to the various procedures and requirements contained in Section 6 of Article XIII D, including whether an election is required. Starting July 1, 1997, all property-related fees or charges must comply with Section 6 of Article XIII D.

When an agency "increases" a property-related fee or charge, compliance with the property-related fee or charge process under Proposition 218 is required. The California Legislature adopted a statute interpreting the term "increase" as applied to property-related fees or charges. However, the courts have the final say in interpreting when a property-related fee or charge is "increased" under Proposition 218.

A property-related fee or charge is "increased" for purposes of Proposition 218 when an agency makes a decision that does any of the following: (1) increases any applicable rate used to calculate the property-related fee or charge; or (2) revises the methodology by which the property-related fee or charge is calculated, if that revision results in an increased amount being levied on any person or parcel of property.

A property-related fee or charge is not "increased" for purposes of Proposition 218 when an agency does either or both of the following: (1) adjusts the amount of a property-related fee or charge in accordance with a schedule of adjustments, including a clearly defined formula for inflation adjustment that was adopted by the agency prior to November 6, 1996; or (2) implements or collects a previously approved property-related fee or charge so long as the fee or charge rate is not increased beyond the level previously approved by the agency, and the methodology previously approved by the agency is not revised so as to result in an increase in the amount being levied on any person or parcel of property.

A property-related fee or charge is also not "increased" for purposes of Proposition 218 in the case in which the actual payments from a person or a parcel of property are higher than would have resulted when the agency approved the property-related fee or charge, if those higher payments are attributable to events other than an increased fee or charge rate or revised methodology, such as a change in the density, intensity, or nature of the use of land.

When an agency "extends" a property-related fee or charge, compliance with the property-related fee or charge process under Proposition 218 is required. The California Legislature adopted a statute interpreting the term "extended" for purposes of the property-related fee or charge provisions of Proposition 218. However, the courts have the final say in interpreting when a property-related fee or charge is "extended" under Proposition 218.

Under the statute, a property-related fee or charge is "extended" for purposes of Proposition 218 when, as applied to an existing property-related fee or charge, an agency extends the stated effective period for the property-related fee or charge, including amendment or removal of a sunset provision or expiration date. While expanding the geographic area subject to a property-related fee or charge does not constitute an "extension" under the statutory definition, it may nonetheless constitute a property-related fee or charge "increase" and thereby be subject to the property-related fee or charge process under Proposition 218 on that basis.

==== Procedures for new or increased property-related fees or charges ====
Subdivision (a) of Section 6 of Article XIII D sets forth the procedures an agency must follow for any new or increased property-related fee or charge. The procedures for a new or increased property-related fee or charge help ensure that a property owner receives appropriate written notice and is given an opportunity to provide input prior to the local agency deciding whether to approve a proposed property-related fee or charge.

==== Written notice and public hearing requirements ====
The parcels upon which a new or increased property-related fee or charge is proposed for imposition must be identified by the agency. The amount or rate of the property-related fee or charge proposed for imposition upon each identified parcel must also be calculated by the agency. The agency must then provide written notice by mail of the proposed property-related fee or charge to the record owner of each identified parcel upon which the property-related fee or charge is proposed for imposition. The written notice must include the amount or rate of the property-related fee or charge proposed upon each parcel, the basis upon which the amount or rate of the proposed property-related fee or charge was calculated, the reason(s) for the property-related fee or charge, together with the date, time and location of at least one public hearing on the proposed property-related fee or charge. Effective January 1, 2022, a notice by a water or sewer agency must also include a statement that there is a 120-day statute of limitations for challenging any new, increased, or extended property-related fee or charge.

The required notice may be given by including it in the agency's regular billing statement for the property-related fee or charge, or by any other mailing by the agency to the address to which the agency customarily mails the billing statement for the property-related fee or charge. However, if the agency desires to preserve any authority it may have to record or enforce a lien on the parcel to which a property-related service is provided, the agency must also mail notice to the record owner's address shown on the last equalized assessment roll if that address is different from the billing or service address.

The agency must conduct at least one public hearing upon the proposed property-related fee or charge not less than 45 days after mailing the notice of the proposed property-related fee or charge to the record owner(s) of each identified parcel upon which the property-related fee or charge is proposed for imposition.

==== Majority protest for property-related fees and charges ====
Proposition 218 allows record owners of each identified parcel upon which the property-related fee or charge is proposed to formally protest the proposed levy. At the required public hearing, the agency must consider all protests against the proposed property-related fee or charge. Only one written protest per parcel, filed by an owner or tenant of the parcel, may be counted in calculating a majority protest to a proposed new or increased property-related fee or charge. If valid written protests against the proposed property-related fee or charge are presented by a majority of owners of the identified parcels, the agency is prohibited from imposing the property-related fee or charge. Failure to comply with any legal requirement, including any applicable statutory requirements, can result in the invalidation of a protest document for purposes of determining whether a majority protest exists.

The majority protest provision for property-related fees and charges requires an absolute majority of the owners of the identified parcels to protest against a proposed property-related fee or charge to legally prohibit imposition of the levy. If a majority protest for a proposed property-related fee or charge is attained, the agency cannot legally override that majority protest.

As a result of the absolute majority requirement, majority protests for proposed property-related fees and charges occasionally occur but not that often. They are most likely to occur in situations where the proposed levy is controversial and the number of affected parcels is small. Where the number of affected parcels is large, a majority protest is very difficult to attain even for controversial levies.

Proposition 218 does not require that a protest document for a proposed property-related fee or charge be included with the required written notice. However, some agencies include a protest document with the required notice as a courtesy. Written protests are often submitted by property owners in letter form. Protest documents are generally treated as public records subject to public disclosure under the California Public Records Act. Effective January 1, 2017, written protests must be preserved by the agency for a minimum of two years following the date of the public hearing to consider written protests.

==== Local initiative power to reduce or repeal agency-approved property-related levies ====
Sometimes a proposed property-related fee or charge may be controversial and/or have significant opposition but not enough opposition to attain a majority protest. The lack of a majority protest does not legally obligate an agency to levy the property-related fee or charge. Occasionally, the governing body of an agency may be responsive to the objections and protests by the public concerning a proposed property-related fee or charge. Responses may take the form of not levying the property-related fee or charge or modifying the property-related fee or charge to make it more acceptable to the public.

However, in situations where the governing body of an agency is not responsive to the objections and protests by the public and approves a controversial property-related fee or charge, the local initiative power under Proposition 218 can generally be used to reduce or repeal the property-related fee or charge. This includes the significantly reduced signature requirement thereunder. An example application is a local initiative to reduce or repeal a significant water fee or charge increase resulting from customers conserving water under drought conditions.

==== Requirements for existing, new, or increased property-related fees and charges ====
Proposition 218 includes five legal requirements that every property-related fee or charge must satisfy. An agency may not extend, impose or increase any property-related fee or charge unless it meets all five requirements. The five requirements help ensure that any property-related fee or charge is a legitimate fee or charge and not a tax masquerading as a fee or charge. All property-related fees and charges are subject to and must comply with the five legal requirements. Property-related fees or charges existing when Proposition 218 became effective must have been in compliance by July 1, 1997.

If a property-related fee or charge is prohibited under any of the five legal requirements, Proposition 218 does not generally prohibit that levy from being structured and imposed as a tax so long as all other applicable legal requirements are satisfied, including the voter approval requirement.

For purposes of determining whether a property-related fee or charge complies with the five requirements, a member of the public may generally make a written request and receive a copy of any local agency supporting documentation pursuant to the California Public Records Act. The payment of a fee covering the direct costs of duplicating requested pages from any supporting documentation may also be required by the agency.

==== Tiered (conservation) water rates and the 2015 Capistrano decision ====
In 2015, a California appellate court in Capistrano Taxpayers Association, Inc. v. City of San Juan Capistrano, 235 Cal. App. 4th 1493 (April 2015) unanimously construed Proposition 218 as prohibiting local governments from charging higher water rates on heavier water users (tiered or conservation water rates) without complying with the cost of service requirement under the measure. The Capistrano decision received widespread international coverage in the media because the decision came down during a severe drought in California. The Capistrano decision was also criticized by then California Governor Jerry Brown.

Tiered water rates generally do not place a cap on the amount of water a parcel may use. Rather, tiered rates make the cost of using water more expensive as a price signal to encourage water conservation. This means that a parcel may generally use as much water as desired as long as the water customer pays the higher price. Thus, tiered rates also function as a revenue raising device (a tax) to the extent the rates exceed the cost of providing the service to the parcel. Property-related charges that exceed the cost of service were precisely the type of abuse by local governments that Proposition 218 was intended to no longer permit.

However, the Capistrano decision did not hold that Proposition 218 invalidated all tiered water rates in California. The appellate court merely stated that "tiers must still correspond to the actual cost of providing service at a given level of usage. The water agency here did not try to calculate the cost of actually providing water at its various tier levels. It merely allocated all its costs among the price tier levels, based not on costs, but on predetermined usage budgets."

The Capistrano decision further stated that "[t]he way Proposition 218 operates, water rates that exceed the cost of service operate as a tax, similar to the way a 'carbon tax' might be imposed on use of energy. But, we should emphasize: Just because such above-cost rates are a tax does not mean they cannot be imposed—they just have to be submitted to the relevant electorate and approved by the people in a vote . . . However, if a local government body chooses to impose tiered rates unilaterally without a vote, those tiers must be based on cost of service for the incremental level of usage, not predetermined budgets."

The Capistrano decision also rejected the argument that higher water tier prices that exceed the cost of service may be justified as "penalties" not within the purview of Proposition 218 restrictions. In holding that this argument is inconsistent with Proposition 218, the court stated that "[i]t would open up a loophole in article XIII D, section 6, subdivision (b)(3) [part of Proposition 218] so large it would virtually repeal it. All an agency supplying any service would need to do to circumvent article XIII D, section 6, subdivision (b)(3), would be to establish a low legal base use for that service, pass an ordinance to the effect that any usage above the base amount is illegal, and then decree that the penalty for such illegal usage equals the incrementally increased rate for that service. Such a methodology could easily yield rates that have no relation at all to the actual cost of providing the service at the penalty levels. And it would make a mockery of the Constitution."

However, Proposition 218 does not prohibit other options available to local governments that accomplish water conservation. Examples of such options include: restricting specific wasteful uses of water (e.g., hosing down a driveway to clear debris), water usage caps or rationing, or public disclosure of excessive water users.

The California Supreme Court subsequently denied requests by then California Attorney General Kamala Harris (representing the California State Water Resources Control Board) and local government interest organizations (Association of California Water Agencies, League of California Cities, and California State Association of Counties) to depublish the Capistrano decision. Despite the best efforts by the state's top lawyers and water experts to depublish the groundbreaking ruling, the California Supreme Court decision to keep it published meant the Capistrano decision can continue to be cited as precedent throughout California in other lawsuits involving the legality under Proposition 218 of tiered water rates charged by other local governments. The Capistrano decision is also considered a milestone in the debate over to what extent appellate court decisions in California should be published as precedent.

After the 2015 Capistrano decision, lawsuits were filed against other local agencies in California, alleging their tiered water rate structures were unconstitutional under Proposition 218.

==== Voter approval for new or increased property-related fees and charges ====
An election is also required for certain new or increased property-related fees or charges. Except for fees or charges for sewer, water, or refuse collection services, no property related fee or charge may be imposed or increased unless and until that property-related fee or charge is submitted and approved by either a majority vote of the property owners of the property subject to the property-related fee or charge or, at the option of the agency, by a two-thirds vote of the electorate residing in the affected area.

A property-related fee or charge election must be conducted not less than 45 days after the required public hearing. An agency is allowed to adopt procedures similar to those for increases in assessments in the conduct of property-related fee or charge elections. However, a property-related fee or charge election cannot be used to validate or override a property-related fee or charge otherwise prohibited under Proposition 218.

Property-related fees or charges for sewer, water, or refuse collection services are exempt from the election requirement. Since the exemptions represent exceptions to an election requirement, the election exemptions are strictly construed. Nevertheless, most property-related fees or charges fall within an election exemption as utility fees for water, sewer, or refuse collection services. Examples of new or increased property-related fees or charges that ordinarily require an election include stormwater fees or flood control fees.

===== SB 231 (2017) statutory amendment regarding stormwater fees =====
In February 2017, then-Senator Robert Hertzberg introduced Senate Bill No. 231 (SB 231) which statutorily redefined and expanded the constitutional "sewer service" election exemption under Proposition 218 as also applying to stormwater fees and charges.

SB 231 attempted to amend the California Constitution so that it would be easier for local agencies to impose fees and charges to pay for stormwater programs and services by exempting stormwater fees and charges from the constitutional election requirement under Proposition 218. However, a prior 2002 published California appellate court decision (the Salinas case) ruled that stormwater fees and charges are not exempt from the constitutional election requirement for property-related fees under Proposition 218 in stating: "We conclude that article XIII D [part of Prop. 218] required the City to subject the proposed storm drainage fee to a vote by the property owners or the voting residents of the affected area."

On October 6, 2017, SB 231 was signed into law by then-Governor Brown. The SB 231 statute became effective on January 1, 2018. Notwithstanding the SB 231 statute, local agencies remain bound by the 2002 Salinas decision interpreting the constitutional language of Proposition 218.

===== Local initiative power to reduce or repeal stormwater fees and charges =====
The property-related fee or charge election requirement for stormwater fees and charges only applies to new or increased stormwater levies. Stormwater fees and charges existing before Proposition 218 became law are not subject to the property-related fee or charge election requirement so long as those property-related fees or charges are not increased by the local agency. However, existing (before Proposition 218 became law) stormwater fees and charges imposed without voter approval can generally be reduced or repealed by the voters using the local initiative power under Proposition 218, including the significantly reduced signature requirement thereunder.

In addition, if any new or increased stormwater fee or charge is imposed by a local government without complying with the election requirement under Proposition 218, such as by a local government relying on SB 231 (2017) to evade the constitutional election requirement for stormwater fees and charges, as a legislative remedy that fee or charge may also be reduced or repealed by the voters using the local initiative power under Proposition 218, including the significantly reduced signature requirement thereunder. This can be done as an alternative to, or concurrent with, any legal remedy for noncompliance with any applicable election requirement under Proposition 218.

After property owner or voter approval of a property-related fee or charge in an election, the local initiative power under Proposition 218 can also generally be used by the electorate to reduce or repeal a stormwater levy. An example where such a local initiative may occur involves election issues or controversies associated with a property owner election, particularly where the local agency adopted controversial election procedures.

Should a property-related fee or charge reduction or repeal initiative qualify for the ballot, the initiative election would be by the registered voters since the initiative power is a power applicable to the electors.

==== Property-related fee or charge election procedures ====
If a property-related fee or charge election is required, the local agency decides whether the election will be a property owner election requiring a majority vote or a two-thirds vote registered voter election. The California Supreme Court has ruled that property owner elections for property-related fees and charges are not subject to the voting secrecy provision in the California Constitution. Historically, the constitutional right to vote in secret did not apply to property owner elections. This was not altered by the passage of Proposition 218.

The California Legislature has enacted additional legal procedures relating to property-related fee or charge elections under Proposition 218. These procedures are mandatory and are in addition to any other procedures that may be adopted by the local agency. The new procedural requirements became legally operative on July 1, 2014.

If the agency submits the proposed property-related fee or charge for approval by a two-thirds vote of the registered voters residing in the affected area, the election must be conducted by the agency's elections official or his or her designee.

If the agency submits the proposed property-related fee or charge for approval by a majority vote of the property owners who will be subject to the fee or charge, then additional procedures apply and must also be followed.

On the face of each envelope in which the notice of election and ballot are mailed, there must appear in substantially the following form the phrase "OFFICIAL BALLOT ENCLOSED" in no smaller than 16-point bold type. A local agency may additionally place the phrase "OFFICIAL BALLOT ENCLOSED" on the face of the envelope in a language or languages other than English. The ballot must include the agency's address for return of the ballot, the date and location where the ballots will be tabulated, and a place where the person returning it may indicate his or her name, a reasonable identification of the parcel, and his or her support or opposition to the proposed property-related fee or charge. The ballots must be tabulated in a location accessible to the public. The ballot must be in a form that conceals its contents once it is sealed by the person submitting it. The ballot must remain sealed until the ballot tabulation starts.

An impartial person designated by the agency who does not have a vested interest in the outcome of the proposed property-related fee or charge must tabulate the ballots. An impartial person includes, but is not limited to, the clerk of the agency. If the agency uses agency personnel for the ballot tabulation, or if the agency contracts with a vendor for the ballot tabulation and the vendor or its affiliates participated in the research, design, engineering, public education, or promotion of the property-related fee or charge, the ballots must be unsealed and tabulated in public view to permit all interested persons to meaningfully monitor the accuracy of the ballot tabulation process.

The ballot tabulation may be continued to a different time or different location accessible to the public, provided that the time and location are announced at the location at which the tabulation started and is posted by the agency in a location accessible to the public. The impartial person may use technological methods to tabulate the ballots, including, but not limited to, punchcard or optically readable (bar-coded) ballots. During and after the tabulation, the ballots are treated as public records subject to public disclosure under the California Public Records Act, and must be made available for inspection by any interested person. The ballots must be preserved for a minimum of two years, after which they may be destroyed as provided by law.

== Application to regional levies ==
Proposition 218 expressly applies to regional governments in California under its broad "local government" constitutional definition. This means that regional governments must comply with the voter approval requirements for taxes as well as the procedures and requirements applicable to special assessments and property-related fees and charges.

Regional governments can also take the form of delivering services and programs from the state level to the regional level. An example is a state administered water program limited to the Central Valley region of California. If a separate regional governmental agency is involved, the agency will generally be subject to Proposition 218. However, when a separate regional governmental agency is not involved, it is unclear whether Proposition 218 compliance is required as California courts have yet to resolve this issue.

There is a growing trend in California to address public policy issues on a regional basis. From the perspective of taxpayers and voters voting on a regional governmental levy (such as a regional tax or a regional property-related fee or charge), significant accountability concerns can arise. Depending upon the laws creating a regional governmental agency, the governing body may not be directly elected by the voters of the region. In many instances, the governing body members of a regional governmental agency are appointed.

As an accountability mechanism, a regional governmental levy can generally be reduced or repealed using the local initiative power under Proposition 218, including the significantly reduced signature requirement thereunder. However, even with the significantly reduced signature requirement, qualifying an initiative for a regional levy will generally be more difficult because of the large number of voters involved.

== Application to state levies ==
Levies imposed by the State of California are generally not subject to Proposition 218 because the state is not a "local government" under Article XIII C or an "agency" under Article XIII D.

While state taxes are not subject to Proposition 218, such taxes are generally subject to approval by two-thirds of all members of the California Legislature. The preceding requirement for state taxes was adopted when Proposition 13 was approved by California voters in 1978. Proposition 26, approved by California voters in 2010, added a broad constitutional definition of "tax" applicable to the state with the resulting effect of expanding the scope of state levies subject to two-thirds approval by the California Legislature.

Special assessments on real property as well as property-related fees and charges are generally not levied by the state. To the extent such levies may be imposed by the State of California, whether two-thirds legislative approval is required is generally determined by the provisions of Proposition 26 approved in 2010.

However, there may exist limited instances in which levies imposed by the State of California might be subject to Proposition 218. Under Proposition 218, the definition of a "special district" refers to "an agency of the State, formed pursuant to general law or a special act, for the local performance of governmental or proprietary functions with limited geographic boundaries." Accordingly, some state agencies are subject to Proposition 218 when they are a "special district." While a state agency imposing a levy at the state level is not a "special district," such an agency may be a "local or regional governmental entity" under the broad definition of a "local government," and thereby be subject to Proposition 218 if the levy is imposed within limited geographic boundaries as opposed to being imposed on a statewide basis.

An example is a state levy imposed solely within the Central Valley region of California. Another example is a state levy imposed solely within the boundaries of a local agency in situations where the state has taken partial or complete control over the local agency and is exercising powers ordinarily exercised by the local agency.

=== Article XIII D – Application to the state ===
Under Proposition 218, any real property within an assessment district that is owned or used by the State of California is generally not exempt from assessment. As a result, the State of California must pay its proportionate share of any special assessment on real property lawfully levied pursuant to Proposition 218. The State of California is also entitled to vote in assessment ballot proceedings required by Proposition 218.

The State of California is also entitled to Proposition 218 protections applicable to property-related fees and charges. This includes rights to receive written notice and protest a property-related fee or charge, the five legal substantive requirement applicable to property-related fees and charges (including "cost of service" protections), and the right to vote if a property owner election is held for a property-related fee or charge.

The California Department of General Services is required to develop compliance standards in the State Administrative Manual to inform owners of state property in California of their duties and responsibilities under Proposition 218. Under the State Administrative Manual, all state agencies are required to determine that, with respect to state properties for which an assessment is levied by a local government, the applicable assessment district was properly constituted pursuant to law and that the requisite special benefit is present. If the assessment is valid, then the state agency which owns or controls the property must promptly pay its proportionate share of the assessment.

== Liberal interpretation constitutional command ==
Section 5 of Proposition 218 contains a constitutional command that its provisions be "liberally construed to effectuate its purposes of limiting local government revenue and enhancing taxpayer consent." The liberal interpretation constitutional command is legally binding on all California courts and judges, the California Legislature, government agencies, and government officials and employees in their interpretation and application of Proposition 218.

The liberal interpretation constitutional command has positively affected the outcome of numerous Proposition 218 lawsuits when it has been properly applied by the courts as intended by the voters.

The importance and significance of the liberal interpretation constitutional command under Proposition 218 can be traced to judicial interpretations of Proposition 13 that strictly construed substantial provisions under that initiative measure to limit their application. In two leading cases in 1982, the California Supreme Court, headed by Chief Justice Rose Bird, formulated and applied a special rule of interpretation applicable only to Proposition 13 that strictly construed the circumstances in which local governments must get two-thirds voter approval to approve local tax increases. This special rule of interpretation was not consistent with the usual interpretation of initiative measures, and has not been applied by California courts in circumstances other than Proposition 13 where a supermajority vote is required.

As a result of the two-thirds voter approval requirement for local taxes under Proposition 13 being strictly construed, local governments in California were able to impose many local tax increases with either simple majority voter approval or no voter approval at all. The resulting impacts frustrated the effective tax relief provisions of Proposition 13 to the significant detriment of California taxpayers, especially homeowners. The special strict construction rule of interpretation also provided a legal basis for California courts to significantly limit the circumstances in which nontax levies such as special assessments, fees, and charges were special taxes subject to two-thirds voter approval under Proposition 13.

== Reaction to Proposition 218 by local governments ==
Proposition 218 significantly limits the ability of local governments to raise revenues without voter approval. As a result, most local governments in California opposed Proposition 218 when it appeared on the ballot, and remain opposed to Proposition 218. In nearly every Proposition 218 appellate court case of significance, local government interests, including the League of California Cities, the California State Association of Counties, and the Association of California Water Agencies have sought to limit the scope and application of Proposition 218 restrictions by arguing in favor of narrow or strict interpretations of the applicable taxpayer protections.

The actions by local governments to limit the scope and application of Proposition 218 are not limited to the courts. Through the legislative process, particularly in the California Legislature, local governments have also supported legislative proposals that limit Proposition 218's provisions. California law allows local governments to lobby in support of such legislative proposals in the California Legislature either directly or indirectly through local government interest associations such as the League of California Cities, the California State Association of Counties, and the Association of California Water Agencies.
