= List of California ballot propositions: 1980–1989 =

This is a list of California ballot propositions from 1980–1989.

== Elections ==
=== June 3, 1980 ===
- 1 – Failed – Parklands And Renewable Resources Investment Program.
- 2 – Passed – Veterans Bond Act Of 1980.
- 3 – Passed – State Capitol Maintenance.
- 4 – Failed – Low-Rent Housing.
- 5 – Passed – Freedom Of Press.
- 6 – Passed – Reapportionment.
- 7 – Passed – Disaster Assistance.
- 8 – Passed – Alternative Energy Sources Facilities Financing.
- 9 – Failed – Taxation. Income. Initiative Constitutional Amendment.
- 10 – Failed – Rent-Control Through Local Ordinance. Initiative Constitutional Amendment.
- 11 – Failed – Oil profits tax. Initiative statute.

=== November 4, 1980 ===
- 1 – Passed – Parklands Acquisition and Development Program.
- 2 – Failed – Lake Tahoe Acquisitions Bond Act of 1980.
- 3 – Failed – Insurance Guarantee Funds. Tax Offset.
- 4 – Failed – Taxation. Real Property. Property Acquisition by Taxing Entity.
- 5 – Failed – Taxation. Real Property Valuation. Disasters, Seismic Safety, Change in Ownership.
- 6 – Passed – Number of Jurors in Civil Cases.
- 7 – Passed – Taxation. Real Property Valuation. Solar Energy Systems
- 8 – Passed – Water Resources Development and Protection
- 9 – Passed – California Safe Drinking Water Bond Law Of 1976.
- 10 – Failed – Smoking and No-Smoking Sections—Initiative Statute
- 11 – Passed – Judges' Salaries.

=== June 8, 1982 ===
- 1 – Passed – New Prison Construction Bond Act of 1981.
- 2 – Failed – President of Senate.
- 3 – Passed – Taxation. Real Property Valuation. Change in Ownership.
- 4 – Passed – Bail.
- 5 – Passed – Gift And Inheritance Taxes. Initiative Statute.
- 6 – Passed – Gift And Inheritance Taxes. Initiative Statute.
- 7 – Passed – Income Tax Indexing. Initiative statute.
- 8 – Passed – Criminal Justice. Initiative Statutes & Constitutional Amendment.
- 9 – Failed – Water Facilities Including A Peripheral Canal.
- 10 – Failed – Reapportionment. Congressional Districts.
- 11 – Failed – Reapportionment. Senate Districts.
- 12 – Failed – Reapportionment. Assembly Districts.

=== November 2, 1982 ===
Beginning with the November 1982 election, the method for numbering propositions changed, such that the numbers would not repeat until 20 years had occurred, at which point the numbering system would start over again.

- 1 – Passed – State School Building Lease-Purchase Bond Law Of 1982.
- 2 – Passed – County Jail Capital Expenditure Bond Act of 1981.
- 3 – Passed – Veterans Bond Act Of 1982.
- 4 – Passed – Lake Tahoe Acquisitions Bond Act.
- 5 – Passed – First-Time Home Buyers Bond Act Of 1982.
- 6 – Failed – Public Pension Fund Investment.
- 7 – Failed – Taxation. Real Property Valuation. New Construction.
- 8 – Passed – Transfer Of Funds By Local Governments.
- 9 – Failed – School Textbooks. Nonpublic Schools.
- 10 – Failed – Unifying Superior, Municipal, And Justice Courts.
- 11 – Failed – Beverage Containers.
- 12 – Passed – Nuclear Weapons.
- 13 – Failed – Water Resources.
- 14 – Failed – Reapportionment By Districting Commission Or Supreme Court.
- 15 – Failed – Handgun Registration.

=== June 5, 1984 ===
- 16 – Passed – County Jail Capital Expenditure Bond Act Of 1984.
- 17 – Passed – New Prison Construction Bond Act Of 1984.
- 18 – Passed – California Park And Recreational Facilities Act Of 1984.
- 19 – Passed – Fish And Wildlife Habitat Enhancement Act Of 1984.
- 20 – Passed – Elected Officials. Disqualification For Libelous Or Slanderous Campaign Statements.
- 21 – Passed – Public Pension Fund Investments.
- 22 – Failed – Exempt State Civil Service Position.
- 23 – Passed – Property Taxation. Seismic Safety Construction Exclusion.
- 24 – Passed – Legislature: Rules, Procedures, Powers, Funding. Initiative Statute.

=== November 6, 1984 ===
- 25 – Passed – Clean Water Bond Law.
- 26 – Passed – State School Building Lease-Purchase Bond Law of 1984.
- 27 – Passed – Hazardous Substance Cleanup Bond Act of 1984.
- 28 – Passed – California Safe Drinking Water Bond Law of 1984.
- 29 – Passed – Veterans Bond Act of 1984.
- 30 – Passed – Senior Center Bond Act of 1984.
- 31 – Passed – Property Taxation. Fire Protection System Exclusion of 1984.
- 32 – Passed – Supreme Court. Transfer of Causes and Review of Decisions of 1984.
- 33 – Passed – Property Tax Postponement. Disabled Person.
- 34 – Failed – Property Taxation. Historic Structure Exemption.
- 35 – Removed from ballot by Uhler v. AFL-CIO.
- 36 – Failed – Taxation. Initiative Constitutional Amendment.
- 37 – Passed – State Lottery. Initiative Constitutional Amendment & Statute.
- 38 – Passed – Voting Materials in English Only. Initiative Statute.
- 39 – Failed – Reapportionment. Initiative Constitutional Amendment & Statute.
- 40 – Failed – Campaign Contribution Limitations. Elective State Offices. Initiative Statute.
- 41 – Failed – Public Aid and Medical Assistance Programs. Initiative Statute.

=== June 3, 1986 ===
- 42 – Passed – Veterans Bond Act Of 1986.
- 43 – Passed – Community Parklands Act Of 1986.
- 44 – Passed – Water Conservation And Water Quality Bond Law Of 1986.
- 45 – Passed – Deposit Of Public Moneys in Credit Union.
- 46 – Passed – Property Taxation.
- 47 – Passed – Allocation Of Vehicle License Fee Taxes To Counties And Cities.
- 48 – Passed – Legislators' And Judges' Retirement Systems.
- 49 – Passed – Nonpartisan Office.
- 50 – Passed – Property Taxation. Disasters.
- 51 – Passed – Multiple Defendants Tort Damage Liability. Initiative Statute.
- 52 – Passed – County Correctional Facility Capital Expenditure Bond Act Of 1986

=== November 4, 1986 ===
- 53 – Passed – Greene-Hughes School Building Lease-Purchase Bond Law Of 1986.
- 54 – Passed – New Prison Construction Bond Act Of 1986.
- 55 – Passed – California Safe Drinking Water Bond Law Of 1986.
- 56 – Passed – Higher Education Facilities Bond Act Of 1986.
- 57 – Passed – Retirement Benefits For Nonjudicial And Nonlegislative Elected State Constitutional Officers.
- 58 – Passed – Taxation. Family Transfers.
- 59 – Passed – Elected District Attorney.
- 60 – Passed – Taxation. Replacement Residences.
- 61 – Failed – Compensation Of Public Officials, Employees, Individual Public Contractors. Initiative Constitutional Amendment & Statute.
- 62 – Passed – Taxation. Local Governments And Districts. Initiative Statute.
- 63 – Passed – Official State Language. Initiative Constitutional Amendment.
- 64 – Failed – Acquired Immune Deficiency Syndrome (AIDS). Initiative Statute.
- 65 – Passed – Restrictions On Toxic Discharges into Drinking Water; Requirement Of Notice Of Persons' Exposure To Toxics. Initiative Statute.

=== June 7, 1988 ===
- 66 – Passed – Elected County Assessor.
- 67 – Passed – Second Degree Murder Of Peace Officer. Minimum Term.
- 68 – Passed – Legislative Campaigns. Spending and Contribution Limits. Partial Public Funding. Initiative Statute.
- 69 – Failed – Acquired Immune Deficiency Syndrome—AIDS. Initiative Statute.
- 70 – Passed – Wildlife, Coastal, And Park Land Conservation Bond Act. Initiative Statute.
- 71 – Failed – Appropriations Limit Adjustment. Initiative Constitutional Amendment.
- 72 – Failed – Emergency Reserve. Dedication Of Certain Taxes To Transportation. Appropriation Limit Change. Initiative Constitutional Amendment.
- 73 – Passed – Campaign Funding. Contribution Limits. Prohibition Of Public Funding. Initiative Statute.
- 74 – Failed – Deddeh Transportation Bond Act.
- 75 – Passed – School Facilities Bond Act Of 1988.
- 76 – Passed – Veterans Bond Act Of 1988.
- 77 – Passed – California Earthquake Safety And Housing Rehabilitation Bond Act Of 1988.

=== November 8, 1988 ===
- 78 – Passed – Higher Education Facilities Bond Act Of 1988.
- 79 – Passed – 1988 School Facilities Bond Act.
- 80 – Passed – New Prison Construction Bond Act Of 1988.
- 81 – Passed – California Safe Drinking Water Bond Act Of 1988.
- 82 – Passed – Water Conservation Bond Law Of 1988.
- 83 – Passed – Clean Water And Water Reclamation Bond Act Of 1988.
- 84 – Passed – Housing And Homeless Bond Act Of 1988.
- 85 – Passed – Library Construction And Renovation Bond Act Of 1988.
- 86 – Passed – County Correctional Facility Capital Expenditure And Youth Facility Bond Act Of 1988.
- 87 – Passed – Property Tax Revenues. Redevelopment Agencies.
- 88 – Passed – Deposit Of Public Moneys.
- 89 – Passed – Governor's Parole Review.
- 90 – Passed – Assessed Valuation. Replacement Dwellings.
- 91 – Passed – Justice Courts. Eligibility.
- 92 – Passed – Commission On Judicial Performance.
- 93 – Passed – Veteran's Property Tax Exemption.
- 94 – Passed – Judges.
- 95 – Failed – Hunger And Homelessness Funding. Initiative Statute.
- 96 – Passed – Communicable Disease Tests. Initiative Statute.
- 97 – Passed – State Occupational Safety And Health Plan. Initiative Statute.
- 98 – Passed – School Funding. Initiative Constitutional Amendment and Statute.
- 99 – Passed – Cigarette And Tobacco Tax. Benefit Fund. Initiative Constitutional Amendment and Statute.
- 100 – Failed – Insurance Rates, Regulation. Initiative Statute.
- 101 – Failed – Automobile Accident Claims And Insurance Rates. Initiative Statute.
- 102 – Failed – Reporting Exposure To AIDS Virus. Initiative Statute.
- 103 – Passed – Insurance Rates, Regulation, Commissioner. Initiative Statute.
- 104 – Failed – Automobile And Other Insurance. Initiative Statute.
- 105 – Passed – Disclosures To Consumers, Voter, Investors. Initiative Statute.
- 106 – Failed – Attorney Fees Limit For Tort Claims. Initiative Statute.
