= Proposition 64 =

Proposition 64 may refer to:

- 2012 Colorado Amendment 64
- California Proposition 64 (disambiguation)
  - 1986 California Proposition 64
  - 2004 California Proposition 64
  - 2016 California Proposition 64
