= California Proposition 90 =

California Proposition 90 may refer to:

- California Proposition 90 (1988)
- California Proposition 90 (2006)
