= California Proposition 98 =

California Proposition 98 may refer to:

- California Proposition 98 (1988), requiring a minimum of the state budget to be spent on K-14 education
- California Proposition 98 (2008), proposing limitations on the use of eminent domain and prohibition of rent control
