= League of California Cities =

The League of California Cities is an association of cities within the state of California, founded in 1898. Most of the state's 482 cities are represented in the league. The League publishes Western City, a monthly magazine, and holds an annual conference and exposition The League advocates for cities at the state capitol, including proper distribution of state taxes to the cities. The main office is in Sacramento.

== History ==
=== Founding ===
In 1898, Ben Lamborn, the city clerk of Alameda, sent a letter to the then over 100 cities in the state, inquiring about their experience with a newly introduced road roller. He added to the inquiry questions such as their name, population, date of incorporation, names of officials, among others.

Haven A. Mason, a community activist, newspaper publisher, attorney and city clerk of Santa Clara, was one recipient. Mason had read about the 1894 founding of the National Municipal League, a citizens group with a mission to fight corruption in city governments. He visited Lamborn in Alameda to discuss organizing city officials around issues such as public records and tax assessment and the introduction of electric light.

Lamborn and Mason presented the idea to Delos Druffel, the mayor of Santa Clara, who then sent letters to the other mayors in the state asking them to attend a meeting to consider this proposal.

Mason and Lamborn then visited James D. Phelan, the mayor of San Francisco. Phelan was interested in the idea of a League of Municipalities, offered San Francisco as a meeting place, and provided $3,000 of his own monies to pay for expenses. Lamborn bartered an agreement with Southern Pacific for them to provide a 3,000-mile pass, which the railroad would recoup in the anticipated travel expenses of city officials' attending the ongoing league meetings.

Druffel received positive replies from about half the cities in California. An invitation was then sent to all cities and incorporated towns, asking them to send representatives to the first meeting, at Pioneer Hall, on Fourth Street in San Francisco, on December 14, 1898. The date was deliberately set for prior to January 1899, "so that the proposed association could be formed in time to consider such matters of legislation as might be deemed expedient to submit to the Legislature then to assemble."

Thirty cities answered the invitation, with others sending words of encouragement. Thirteen cities, all from the San Francisco Bay Area, sent delegates. Phelan was elected president, Mason was named secretary and Lamborn was chosen for the League's executive committee, along with Mayor Joseph Hutchinson of Palo Alto.

== Policy positions ==
The league campaigned against 2006's Proposition 90, spending $4.1 million against it. The proposition lost. The League campaigned against Proposition 98, and for Proposition 99, in the Proposition 98/99 ballot proposals of 2008, spending $5.8 million on the measures. 98 failed, while 99 passed.

The League was an advocate of 2010's Proposition 22, a constitutional amendment that would prevent the state government from taking certain funds, such as transportation funds, from the local governments. They spent $2.8 million towards its passage. It passed with 61% of the vote.

== Helen Putnam Award of Excellence ==
The league sponsors the Helen Putnam Award of Excellence, which is presented annually to city programs that "Improve the quality of life in local communities, implement efficiencies in service delivery and operations, and provide services responsive to the local community."

The award is named after Helen Putnam, a mayor of Petaluma, and Sonoma County supervisor.

== See also ==
- List of state Municipal Leagues
