= 2008 Los Angeles County Board of Supervisors election =

2008 Los Angeles County Board of Supervisors elections

3 of the 5 seats of the Los Angeles County Board of Supervisors
	Majority party	Minority party
Party	Democratic	Republican
Seats before	3	2
Seats won	1	2
Seats after	3	2
Seat change	Steady	Steady

The 2008 Los Angeles County Board of Supervisors elections were held on June 3, 2008, coinciding with the California elections, June 2008. Three of the five seats (for the Second, Fourth and Fifth Districts) of the Los Angeles County Board of Supervisors were contested in this election. None of the incumbents were termed out.

== Results ==
=== Second District ===
2008 Los Angeles County Board of Supervisors election District 2

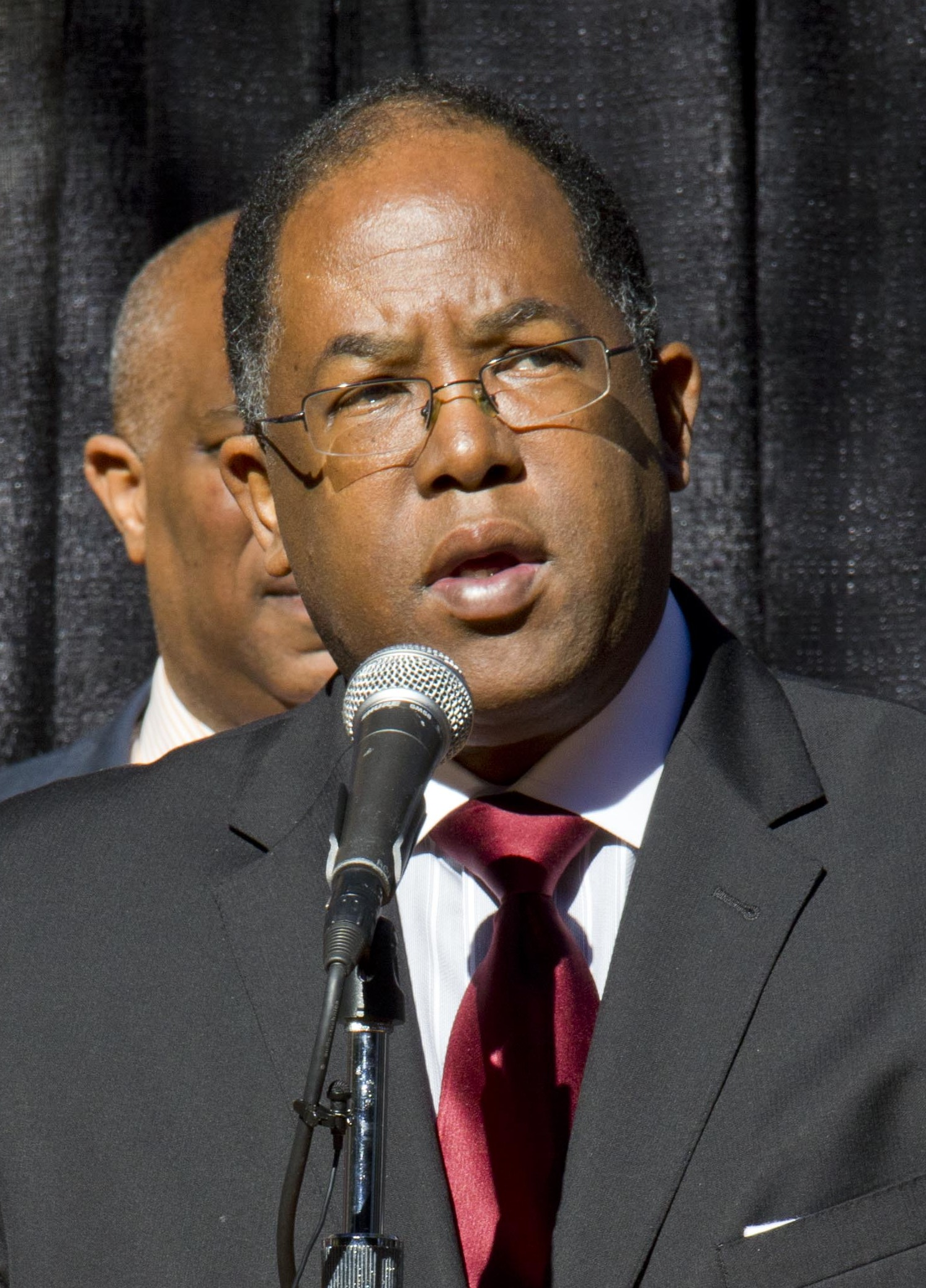

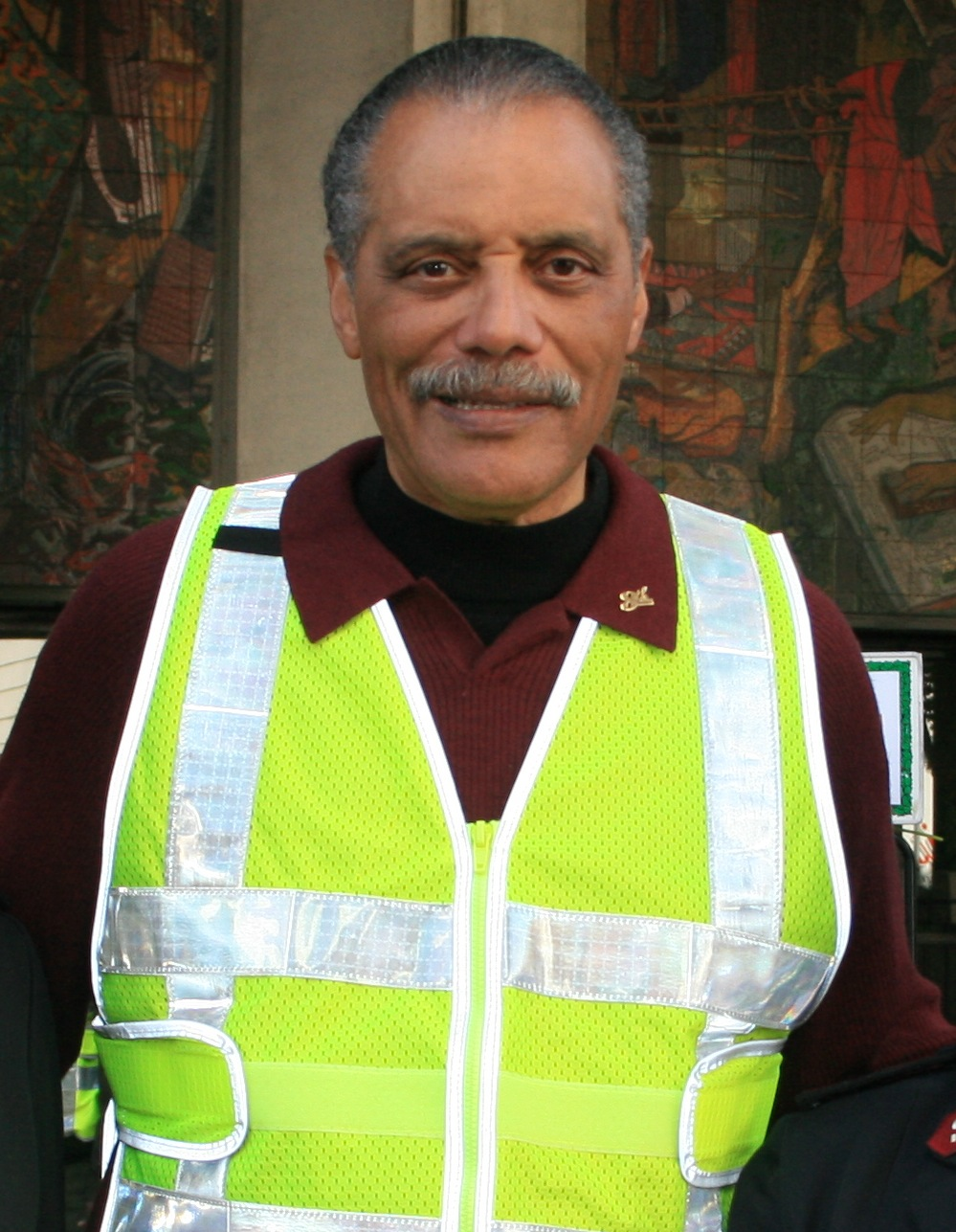
Candidate	Mark Ridley-Thomas	Bernard C. Parks
Popular vote	68,192	59,069
Percentage	45.63%	39.53%
Supervisor before election
Yvonne Brathwaite Burke
Supervisor
Mark Ridley-Thomas

2nd District supervisorial election - June 3, 2008
Candidate	Votes	%
Mark Ridley-Thomas	68,192	45.63
Bernard C. Parks	59,069	39.53
Antonio Alvarez	5,733	3.84
Martin L K Aubrey	4,803	3.21
Thomas Neusom	3,519	2.35
D "Doc" Smith Jr	2,748	1.84
Morris Griffin	2,274	1.52
Drew "Doc" Fenton	2,117	1.42
F Thompson	987	0.66
Turnout	{{{votes}}}	20.89%
Total votes	149,442	100.00

Since Second District voters failed to elect a Supervisor by a two-thirds vote, a runoff election was held on November 4, 2008, coinciding with the 2008 United States presidential election.

2nd District supervisorial election - November 4, 2008
Candidate	Votes	%
Mark Ridley-Thomas	309,654	61.18
Bernard C. Parks	196,442	38.82
Turnout	{{{votes}}}	69.18%
Total votes	506,096	100.00

=== Fourth District ===
2008 Los Angeles County Board of Supervisors election District 4

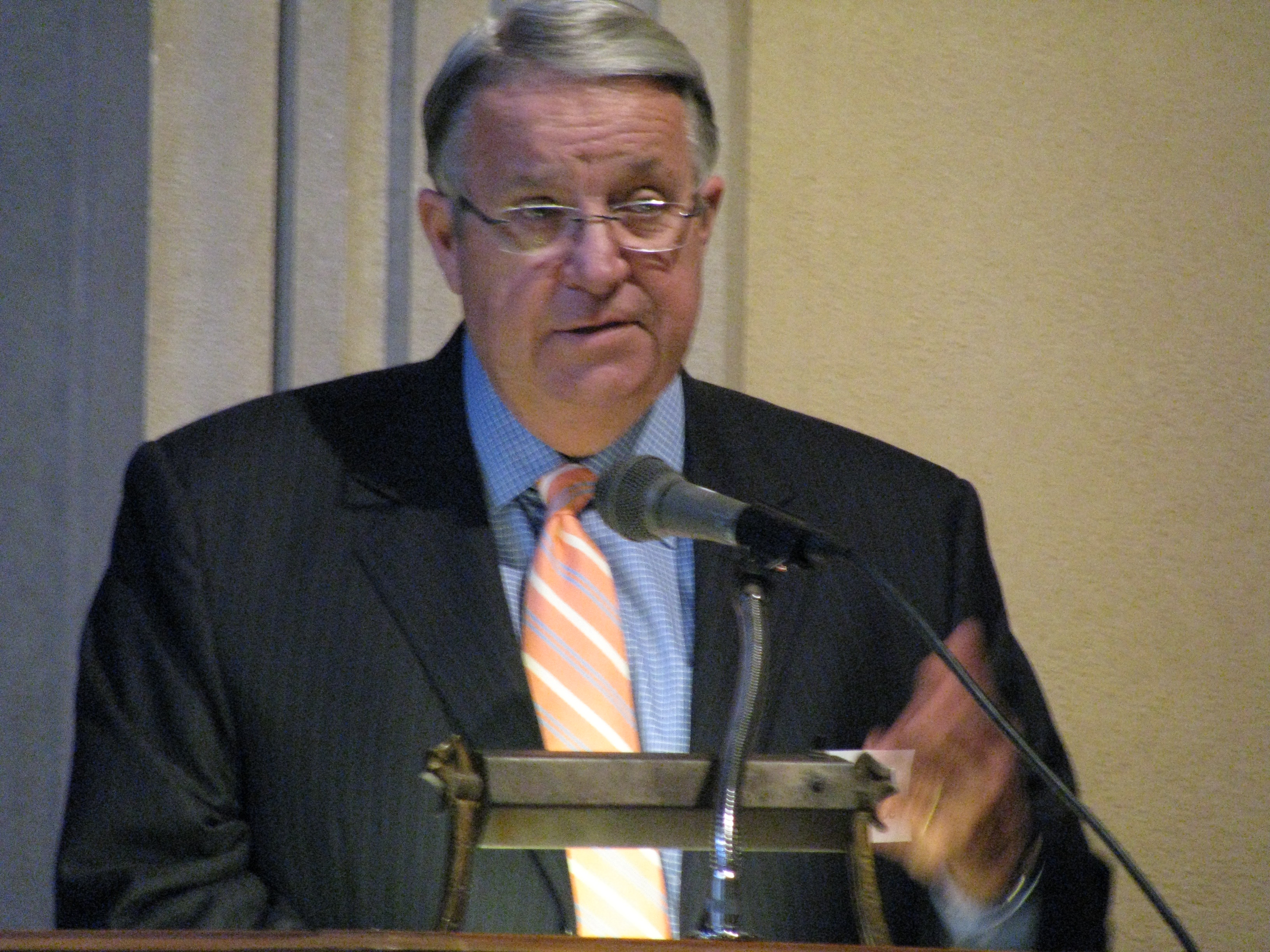

Candidate	Don Knabe	Marylou Cabral
Popular vote	95,062	23,703
Percentage	70.04	17.46
Candidate	Jay Shah
Popular vote	16,963
Percentage	12.50%
Supervisor before election
Don Knabe
Supervisor
Don Knabe

4th District supervisorial election, 2008
Candidate	Votes	%
Don Knabe (incumbent)	95,062	70.04
Marylou Cabral	23,703	17.46
Jay Shah	16,963	12.50
Turnout	{{{votes}}}	18.97%%
Total votes	135,728	100.00

=== Fifth District ===
2008 Los Angeles County Board of Supervisors election District 5

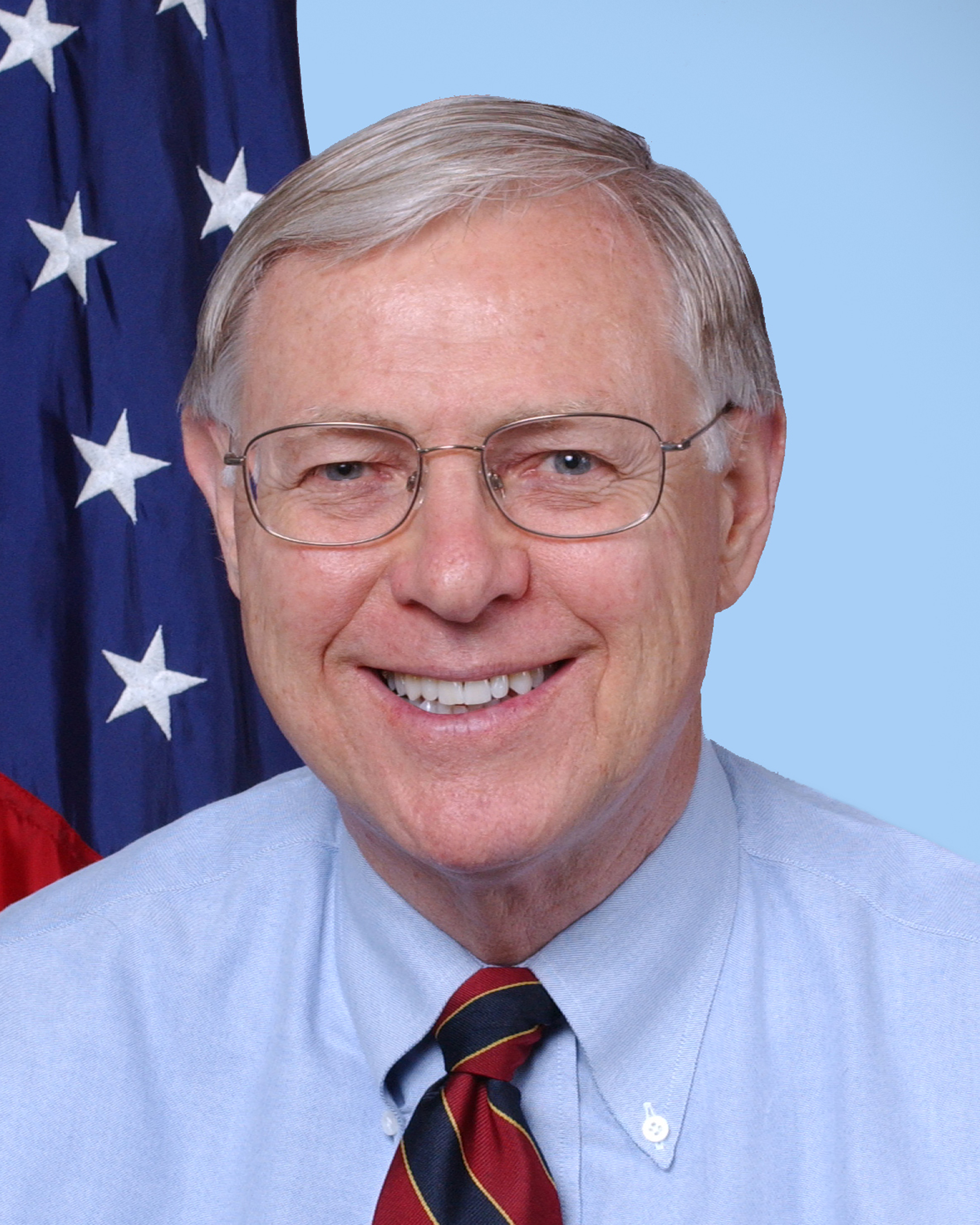
Candidate	Michael D. Antonovich	Stephen Mark Hinze
Popular vote	114,634	29,875
Percentage	79.33%	20.67%
Supervisor before election
Michael D. Antonovich
Supervisor
Michael D. Antonovich

5th District supervisorial election - June 3, 2008
Candidate	Votes	%
Michael D. Antonovich (incumbent)	114,634	79.33
Stephen Mark Hinze	29,875	20.67
Turnout	{{{votes}}}	15.06%
Total votes	144,509	100.00
