= Proposition 8 (disambiguation) =

Proposition 8 may refer to:

- 2008 California Proposition 8, which added a ban on same-sex marriage to the state Constitution
- 2018 California Proposition 8, to authorize state regulation of kidney dialysis clinics
- 1982 California Proposition 8, which provided additional rights to crime victims
- 1978 California Proposition 8, relating to the reassessment of property during a decline in value
- 1911 California Proposition 8, which introduced the recall of public officials
- 2007 Texas Proposition 8, relating to home equity loans
