= California Proposition 63 =

California Proposition 63 may refer to:

- California Proposition 63 (1986) - Official State Language. Initiative Constitutional Amendment
- California Proposition 63 (2004) - California Mental Health Services Act (MHSA)
- California Proposition 63 (2016) - Firearms and Ammunition Sales
