= 1978 California Proposition 13 =

Ballot initiative which capped property tax at 1% and yearly increases at 2%

- June 6, 1978
- People's Initiative to Limit Property Taxation

Results
Choice	Votes	%
Yes	4,280,689	64.79%
No	2,326,167	35.21%
Valid votes	6,606,856	96.55%
Invalid or blank votes	236,145	3.45%
Total votes	6,843,001	100.00%
- Results by county Yes: 70–80% 60–70% 50–60% No: 50–60%

Proposition 13 (officially named the People's Initiative to Limit Property Taxation) is an amendment of the Constitution of California enacted during 1978, by means of the initiative process, to cap property taxes and limit property reassessments to when the property changes ownership, and to require a 2/3 majority for tax increases in the state legislature. The initiative was approved by California voters in a primary election on June 6, 1978, by a nearly two to one margin. It was upheld by the Supreme Court in 1992 in Nordlinger v. Hahn, 505 U.S. 1 (1992). Proposition 13 is embodied in Article XIII A of the Constitution of the State of California.

The proposition decreased property taxes by assessing values at their 1976 value, limiting the rate of taxation to 1% of the assessed value, and restricting annual increases of assessed value to an inflation factor, not to exceed 2% per year. It prohibits reassessment of a new base year value except in cases of (a) change in ownership, or (b) completion of new construction. These rules apply equally to all real estate, residential and commercial—whether owned by individuals or corporations.

Significantly, the initiative also requires a two-thirds majority in both legislative houses for future increases of any state tax rates or amounts of revenue collected, including income tax rates. It also requires a two-thirds majority in local elections for local governments wishing to increase special taxes. (A "special tax" is a tax devoted specifically to a purpose, e.g., homelessness or road repair: money that does not go into a general fund.)

Proposition 13 has been described as California's most famous and influential ballot measure; it received enormous publicity throughout the United States. Passage of the initiative presaged a "taxpayer revolt" throughout the country that is sometimes thought to have contributed to the election of Ronald Reagan to the presidency during 1980. Of 30 anti-tax ballot measures that year, 13 passed. The proposition has been called the "third rail" (meaning "untouchable subject") of California politics, and it has generally been unpopular for lawmakers to attempt to change it.

As a consequence of Proposition 13, homeowners in California receive a property subsidy that increases the longer that they own their home. It has been described as a contributor to California's housing crisis, as its acquisition value system (where the assessed value of property is based on the date of its acquisition rather than current market value) incentivizes long-time homeowners to hold onto their properties rather than downsize, reducing the housing supply and raising housing prices.

== Purpose ==
=== Limit the tax rate for properties ===
Section 1. (a) The maximum amount of any ad valorem tax on real property shall not exceed one percent (1%) of the full cash value of such property. The one percent (1%) tax to be collected by the counties and apportioned according to law to the districts within the counties.

— California Constitution Article XIII A

Proposition 13 declared property taxes were to be assessed their 1976 value and restricted annual increases of the tax to an inflation factor, not to exceed 2% per year. A reassessment of the property tax can be made only when a) the property ownership changes or b) there is construction done.

=== State responsibility ===
The state has been given the responsibility of distributing the property tax revenues to local agencies.

=== Voting requirements state taxes ===
In addition to decreasing property taxes and changing the role of the state, Proposition 13 also contained language requiring a two-thirds (2/3) majority in both legislative houses for future increases of any state tax rates or amounts of revenue collected, including income tax rates and sales tax rates.

=== Two-thirds voter approval requirement for local special taxes ===
Proposition 13 also requires two-thirds (2/3) voter approval for cities, counties, and special districts to impose special taxes.

In Altadena Library District v. Bloodgood, 192 Cal. App. 3d 585 (June 1987), the California Court of Appeal for the Second District determined that the two-thirds (2/3) voter approval requirement for special taxes under Proposition 13 applied to citizens initiatives. California law was clear for decades that local special tax initiatives were subject to two-thirds voter approval under Proposition 13.

==== 2017 California Supreme Court Upland decision ====
In 2017, a divided California Supreme Court in the Upland case made a distinction between taxes proposed by the governing body of a local government and taxes proposed under the local initiative power for purposes of applying taxpayer protection laws such as Proposition 13. This distinction created a legal loophole that has allowed tax increase supporters and politicians to evade the two-thirds voter approval requirement for special taxes under Proposition 13 by using the initiative power to propose tax increases.

As a result of the Upland case, special taxes qualifying for the ballot under the initiative power are no longer subject to two-thirds voter approval under Proposition 13. However, special taxes placed on the ballot by the governing body of a local government such as a city council or a county board of supervisors remain subject to two-thirds voter approval under Proposition 13.

Exploitation of the Upland loophole, which was created by the courts and not by the voters, has resulted in many special tax increases being imposed without two-thirds voter approval under Proposition 13. This includes the controversial Measure ULA (2022) “mansion tax” in Los Angeles and many local sales tax and parcel tax increases that would have not been approved without use of the Upland loophole.

==== 2026 California Proposition 43 ====
Proposition 43 on the November 2026 ballot in California is a proposed constitutional amendment that would prospectively close the court-created Upland loophole and restore the two-thirds voter approval requirement for local special taxes under Proposition 13 to once again include special taxes placed on the ballot under the initiative power. Proposition 43 would have the effect of restoring the state of the law that existed in California for decades (under the 1987 Altadena Library case) prior to the 2017 Upland decision.

The Upland decision had the resulting effect of taking away from voters their constitutional right to vote on local initiative special taxes under Proposition 13, a right that was previously upheld in the 1987 Altadena Library case. The primary purpose of Proposition 43 is to restore that constitutional right to vote on all local special taxes under Proposition 13, including local special taxes proposed under the initiative power.

Proposition 43 was placed on the ballot by the California Legislature with strong bipartisan support from both Democrats and Republicans by a 68–2 vote in the State Assembly and by a 35–1 vote in the State Senate.

== Origins ==
There are several theories of the origins of Proposition 13. The evidence for or against these accounts varies.

=== Displacement of retired homeowners ===
One explanation is that older Californians with fixed incomes had increasing difficulty paying property taxes, which were rising as a result of California's population growth, continued growth in state and local government spending, increasing housing demand, government restrictions on new developments and inflation. Due to severe inflation during the 1970s, reassessments of residential property increased property taxes so much that some retired people could no longer afford to remain in homes they had purchased long before. A 2006 study published in Law & Society Review supported this explanation, reporting that older voters, homeowners, and voters expecting a tax increase were more likely to vote for Proposition 13.

Proposition 13 is not the only law in California designed to prevent tax-induced displacement. The California Tax Postponement Program, passed in 1977, ensures that "homeowners who are seniors, are blind, or have a disability to defer current-year property taxes on their principal residence if they meet certain criteria".

=== School funding equalization ===
Another explanation is Proposition 13 drew its impetus from the 1971 and 1976 California Supreme Court rulings in Serrano v. Priest, which somewhat equalized California school funding by redistributing local property taxes from wealthy to poor school districts. According to this explanation, property owners in affluent districts perceived that the taxes they paid were no longer benefiting their local schools, and chose to cap their taxes.

A problem with this explanation is that the Serrano decision and school finance equalization were popular among California voters. While Californians who voted for Proposition 13 were less likely than other voters to support school finance equalization, Proposition 13 supporters were not more likely to oppose the Serrano decision, and on average they were typically supportive of both the Serrano decision and of school finance equalization.

=== Regressive tax distributions ===
A 2020 study by Joshua Mound published in the Journal of Policy History challenged the idea that wealthy property owners' desire to cap their property taxes was the impetus for enacting Proposition 13, instead saying the "tax revolt" was rooted in lower and middle-income Americans' longstanding frustration with unfair and highly regressive tax distributions during the post-World War II decades.

The study said pro-growth Kennedy-Johnson "Growth Liberals" cut federal income taxes in the highest brackets in the 1960s while local officials raised regressive state and local taxes, creating a "pocketbook squeeze" that made voters less likely to approve local levies and bonds, which eventually led to the passage of Proposition 13. The study said the tax revolt was not limited to white voters nor associated with rising conservatism associated with the collapse of the "New Deal order" and the election of Ronald Reagan.

=== Expansion of state government ===
Another explanation that has been offered is that spending by California's government had increased dramatically during the years prior to 1978, and voters sought to limit further growth. The evidence supporting this explanation is limited, as there have been no studies relating Californians' views on the size and role of government to their views on Proposition 13. It is true that California's government had grown. Between 1973 and 1977, California state and local government expenditures per $1,000 of personal income were 8.2% higher than the national norm. From 1949 to 1979, public sector employment in California outstripped employment growth in the private sector. By 1978, 14.7% of California's civilian work force were state and local government employees, almost double the proportion of the early 1950s.

=== Junior college expansion ===
One example of the massive expansion of government in California in the decades before Proposition 13 was the rapid growth of public postsecondary education and its expansion into almost every urban area in the state. In 1900, California had only a single public university at Berkeley, the University of California, and state normal schools which provided two-year teacher training programs at Chico, Los Angeles, San Diego, and San Francisco. In 1907, the American junior college movement was launched in California when the state legislature authorized high schools to offer lower-division college-level coursework, thereby enabling more high school graduates to attempt such courses without having to move away for college. California was the proud leader of this movement, in that the United States went from zero junior colleges in 1900 to nineteen by 1915, of which eight were based in California.

In 1960, the Master Plan for Higher Education provided that junior colleges would be established within commuting distance of nearly all California residents, which required the founding of twenty-two new colleges on top of the sixty-four colleges already operating as of 1960. In 1967, the junior colleges were renamed "community colleges" and became part of the California Community Colleges system.

Before Proposition 13, community college districts were able "to levy certain taxes for special purposes without a vote of the public". Among these purposes were community services, fringe benefits, and child care. For example, before 1978, the North Orange County Community College District levied a special tax on all property owners in the district which funded a comprehensive health care plan generous enough to amount to an overall 4% increase in compensation for all employees. By severely curtailing the ability of community college districts to levy property taxes, Proposition 13 shifted the state's contribution to community colleges from 38% to 78% of their revenue.

=== Corruption ===
During the early 1960s, there were several scandals in California involving county assessors. These assessors were found rewarding friends and allies with artificially low assessments, with tax bills to match. These scandals led to the passage of Assembly Bill 80 (AB 80) in 1966, which imposed standards to hold assessments to market value. The return to market value in the wake of AB 80 could easily represent a mid-double-digit percentage increase in assessment for many homeowners. As a result, a large number of California homeowners experienced an immediate and drastic rise in valuation, simultaneous with rising tax rates on that assessed value, only to be told that the taxed monies would be redistributed to distant communities. Cynicism about the favoritism of the tax system towards the wealthy and well-connected persisted into the 1970s. The ensuing anger started to form into a backlash against property taxes which coalesced around Howard Jarvis, a former newspaperman and appliance manufacturer, turned taxpayer activist in retirement.

== Measure ==
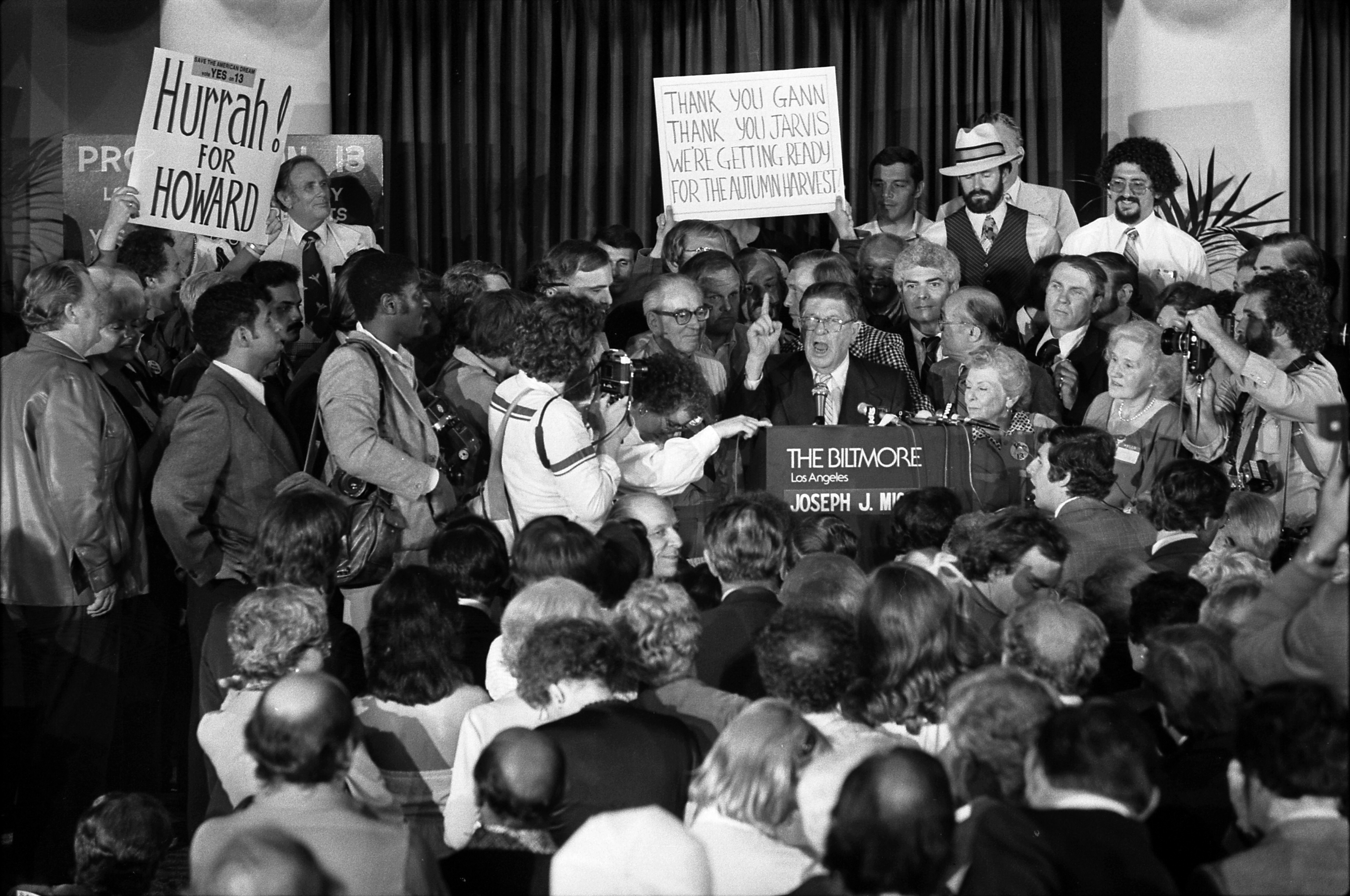
Howard Jarvis speaking to crowd after California Proposition 13 victory

Howard Jarvis and Paul Gann were the most vocal and visible advocates of Proposition 13. Officially named the People's Initiative to Limit Property Taxation, and known popularly as the Jarvis-Gann Amendment, Proposition 13 was listed on the ballot through the California ballot initiative process, a provision of the California Constitution that allows a proposed law or constitutional amendment to be offered to voters if advocates collect a sufficient number of signatures on a petition. Proposition 13 passed with roughly two-thirds of those who voted in favor and with the participation of around two-thirds of registered voters. After passage, it became article XIII A of the California Constitution.

Under Proposition 13, the annual real estate tax on a parcel of property is limited to 1% of its assessed value. This "assessed value" may be increased only by a maximum of 2% per year until, and unless, the property has a change of ownership. At the time of the change in ownership the low assessed value may be reassessed to complete current market value that will produce a new base year value for the property, but future assessments are likewise restricted to the 2% annual maximum increase of the new base year value.

The property may be reassessed under certain conditions other than a change of ownership, such as when additions or new construction occur. The assessed value is also subject to reduction if the market value of the property declines below its assessed value, such as during a real estate slump. Reductions of property valuation were not provided for by Proposition 13 itself, but were made possible by the passage of Proposition 8 (Senate Constitutional Amendment No. 67) during 1978 that amended Proposition 13. Such a real estate slump and downward reassessments occurred during 2009 when the California State Board of Equalization announced an estimated reduction of property tax base year values due to negative inflation. The property tax in California is an ad valorem tax meaning that the tax assessed generally increases and decreases with the value of the property.

== Outcome ==

Proposition 13
Choice	Votes	%
Yes	4,280,689	64.79
No	2,326,167	35.21
Total	6,606,856	100.00
Valid votes	6,606,856	96.55
Invalid/blank votes	236,145	3.45
Total votes	6,843,001	100.00
Registered voters/turnout		–

== Effects ==
=== Reduction in taxes ===
In the year after Proposition 13 was passed, property tax revenue to local governments declined by roughly 60% statewide. However, by 2003, the inflation-adjusted property tax collected by local governments exceeded the pre-1978 levels, and has continued to increase.

In 2009, the advocacy group Howard Jarvis Taxpayers Association estimated that Proposition 13 had reduced taxes paid by California taxpayers by an aggregate $528 billion.

Other estimates show that Proposition 13 may not have reduced California's overall per-capita tax burden or State spending. The think tank Tax Foundation reported that in 1978, Californians had the third highest tax burden as a proportion of state income (tax-per-capita divided by income-per-capita) of 12.4% ($3,300 tax per capita, inflation adjusted). By 2012, it had fallen slightly to the sixth highest rate, 10.9%, ($4,100 tax per capita, inflation adjusted).

California has the highest marginal income and capital gains tax rate and is in the top ten highest corporate tax and sales tax rates nationally. In 2016, California had the 17th-highest per-capita (per-person) property tax revenue in the country at $1,559, up from 31st in 1996. In 2019, WalletHub applied California's statewide effective property tax rate of 0.77% to the state median home market value of $443,400; the annual property taxes of $3,414 on the median home value was the 9th-highest in the United States.

=== Property tax equity ===
Proposition 13 sets the assessed value of properties at the time of purchase (known as an acquisition value system), with a possible 2% annual assessment increase. As a result, properties of equal value can have a great amount of variation in their assessed value, even if they are next to each other. The disparity grows when property prices appreciate by more than 2% a year. The Case–Shiller housing index shows prices in Los Angeles, San Diego, and San Francisco appreciated 170% from 1987 (the start of available data) to 2012 while the 2% cap only allowed a 67% increase in taxes on homes that were not sold during this 26-year period.

A 1993 report from the joint University of California and State of California research program, California Policy Seminar (now the California Policy Research Center), said that a property tax system based on acquisition value links property tax liability to ability to pay and has a progressive impact on the tax structure, based on income. It said that a revenue-neutral Los Angeles County reform which raises all assessments to true market value and lowers the property tax rate would harm elderly and low-income households.

The think tank Institute on Taxation and Economic Policy (ITEP) considers property tax caps like Proposition 13 poorly targeted and instead advocates "circuit breaker" caps or homestead exemptions to levy property taxes based on ability to pay; yet in 2018, ITEP ranked California's tax code as the most progressive in the United States, in part due to its high marginal income and capital gains rates. Since wealth is associated with ownership of "intangible" assets like stocks, bonds, or business equity, which are exempt from wealth taxes, ITEP says regressive state tax distributions that rely on property taxes on real property can worsen inequality, and that of all US states in 2018, California's tax code reduced inequality the most.

=== Tenure of households ===
By comparing California over the period 1970 to 2000 with other states, (using data from the US Census Bureau, not state or county-level property records) Wasi and White (2005) estimated that Proposition 13 caused homeowners to increase the duration of time spent in a given home by 9% (1.04 years), and renters to increase their tenure by 18% (0.79 years). They also estimated that this effect was more pronounced in the coastal cities, with the increase in tenancy by owner-occupiers in the Bay Area being predicted at 28% (3.0 years), Los Angeles 21% (2.3 years), and Fresno 7% (0.77 years). They speculate that renters may have longer tenure due to less turnover of owner-occupied housing to move into.

Other studies have found that increased tenure in renting can be attributed in part to rent control.

=== Funding volatility ===
A 2016 report from the California Legislative Analyst's Office found that property tax revenue to local governments was similarly volatile before and after the passage of Proposition 13. While Proposition 13 stabilized the base, prior to Proposition 13, governments would adjust the rate annually to counteract changes to the base.

=== Fiscal impact from new home construction ===
According to the California Building Industry Association, construction of a median priced house results in a slight positive fiscal impact, as opposed to the position that housing does not "pay its own way". The trade association argues that this is because new homes are assessed at the value when they are first sold. Additionally, due to the higher cost of new homes, the trade association claims that new residents are more affluent and may provide more sales tax revenues and use less social services of the host community.

=== Taxes targeted to services ===
Others argue that the real reason for the claimed negative effects is lack of trust for elected officials to spend the public's money wisely. Business improvement districts are one means by which property owners have chosen to tax themselves for additional government services. Property owners find that these targeted levies are more palatable than general taxes.

=== Sales disincentives, higher housing costs ===
Proposition 13 alters the balance of the housing market because it provides disincentives for selling property, in favor of remaining at the current property and modifying or transferring to family members to avoid a new, higher property tax assessment.

Proposition 13 reduces property tax revenue for municipalities in California. They are forced to rely more on state funding and therefore may lose autonomy and control. The amount of taxes available to the municipality in any given year largely depends on the number of property transfers taking place. Yet since existing property owners have an incentive to remain in their property and not sell, there are fewer property transfers under this type of property tax system.

California also has high rates of migrants from other countries and states, which has contributed to more demand for housing, and it has low amounts of moderately priced housing. The different tax treatment can make real estate more valuable to the current owner than to any potential buyer, so selling it often makes no economic sense.

=== Commercial property owners ===
Owners of commercial real estate benefited under the original rules of Proposition 13: If a corporation owning commercial property (such as a shopping mall) was sold or merged, but the property stayed technically deeded to the corporation, ownership of the property could effectively have changed without triggering Proposition 13's reassessment provisions. These rules were subsequently changed; under current law, a change of control or ownership of a legal entity causes a reassessment of its real property as well as the real property of entities that it controls.

The application to commercial and rental property can lead to an advantage and profit margin for incumbent individuals or corporations who purchased property at a time when prices were low. This is in contrast to the initial campaign, where Jarvis argued that lowering property tax rates would cause landlords to pass savings onto renters, who were upset at their rapidly rising rents driven by the high inflation of the 1970s. Most landlords did not do this, which became a motivating factor for rent control.

==== Property transfer loophole ====
Some businesses have exploited a property transfer loophole in Proposition 13 implementing statutes created by the California Legislature that define what constitutes a change in property ownership. To take advantage of this loophole, businesses only have to make sure that no partnership exceeds the 50% mark in control in order to avoid a reassessment. The Legislature could close this loophole with a 2/3 vote. In 2018, the California Board of Equalization estimated that closing this loophole would raise up to $269 million annually in new tax revenue. There have been several legislative attempts to close the loophole, none of which have been successful.

Proponents of split roll have said the intent of Proposition 13 was to protect residential property taxes from spiking and say the broad application of Proposition 13 to commercial property is a loophole while opponents say voters deliberately sought to extend Proposition 13 protections to commercial property by rejecting a split roll measure promoted by then-Governor Jerry Brown, Proposition 8, in 1978 (on the same ballot as Proposition 13), by a vote of 53–47%, and instead passed Proposition 13 with nearly 65% of the vote. A Los Angeles Times article published shortly following the passage of Proposition 13 supported the latter interpretation, stating:

"There is no question that the voters knew exactly what they were doing. Indeed, The Los Angeles Times-Channel 2 News Survey, in which almost 2,500 voters filled out questionnaires as they left the polls Tuesday, revealed that Propositions 8 [the split roll alternative] and 13 were seen by most voters as mutually exclusive alternatives, even though it was entirely possible for voters to play it safe by voting for both measures. Among those who voted for Proposition 13, only one in five also voted for Proposition 8, while Proposition 8 was endorsed by fully 91% of those who voted "no" on Proposition 13. Proposition 13 was advertised as a stronger tax relief measure than Proposition 8. That is exactly how the voters saw it, and that is exactly what they wanted."

=== Sales and other taxes ===
==== Other taxes created or increased ====
Local governments in California now use imaginative strategies to maintain or increase revenue due to Proposition 13 and the attendant loss of property tax revenue (which formerly went to cities, counties, and other local agencies). For instance, many California local governments have sought voter approval for special taxes such as parcel taxes for public services that used to be paid for entirely or partially from property taxes imposed before Proposition 13 became law. Provision for such taxes was made by the 1982 Community Facilities Act (more commonly known as Mello-Roos). Sales tax rates have also increased from 6% (pre-Proposition 13 level) to 7.25%, with cities such as Lancaster and Palmdale authorizing an 11.25% tax.

In 1991, the Supreme Court of California ruled in Rider v. County of San Diego that a San Diego County sales tax to fund jail and courthouse construction was unconstitutional. The court ruled that because the tax money was targeted towards specific programs rather than general spending, it counted as a "special tax" under Proposition 13 and required approval by two-thirds of the voters, whereas the tax had passed with a simple majority.

The imposition of these special taxes and fees was a target of California Proposition 218 ("Right to Vote on Taxes Act") which passed in 1996. It constitutionally requires voter approval for local government taxes and some nontax levies such as benefit assessments on real property and certain property-related fees and charges.

=== Cities and localities ===
==== Greater effect on coastal metropolitan areas than on rest of state ====
Proposition 13 disproportionately affects coastal metropolitan areas, such as San Francisco and Los Angeles, where housing prices are higher, relative to inland communities with lower housing prices. According to the National Bureau of Economic Research, more research would show whether benefits of Proposition 13 outweigh the redistribution of tax base and overall cost in lost tax revenue.

==== Loss of local government power to state government ====
Local governments have become more dependent on state funds, which has increased state power over local communities. The state provides "block grants" to cities to provide services, and bought out some facilities that locally administer state-mandated programs. The Economist argued in 2011 that "for all its small government pretensions, Proposition 13 ended up centralizing California's finances, shifting them from local to state government."

==== Resultant planning changes, cost or degradation of services, new fees ====
Due to the reduction in revenue generated from property tax, local governments have become more dependent on sales taxes for general revenue funds. This resulted in the fiscalization of land use, meaning that land use decisions are influenced by the ability of a new development to generate tax revenue. Proposition 13 has increased the incentive for local governments to attract new commercial developments, such as big box retailers and car dealerships instead of residential housing developments, because of commercial development's ability to generate revenue through sales tax and business licenses tax. This may discourage growth of other sectors and job types that may provide better opportunities for residents. In terms of public services, office and retail development are further incentivized because they do not cost the local governments as much as residential developments. Additionally, cities have decreased services and increased fees to compensate for the shortfall, with particularly high impact fees levied on developers to impose the cost of the additional services and infrastructure that new developments will require. These costs are typically shifted to the building's buyer, who may be unaware of the thousands in fees included with the building's cost.

=== Education and public services ===
==== Effect on public schools ====
California's K-12 public schools, which during the 1960s had been ranked nationally as among the best, deteriorated substantially in many surveys of student achievement, according to a 2005 RAND study. Some disputed the attribution of the decline to Proposition 13's role in the change to state financing of public schools, because schools financed mostly by property taxes were declared unconstitutional (the variances in funding between lower and higher income areas being deemed to violate the Equal Protection Clause of the Fourteenth Amendment to the Constitution) in Serrano vs. Priest, and Proposition 13 was then passed partially as a result of that case. California's spending per pupil was the same as the national average until about 1985, when it began decreasing, which resulted in another referendum, Proposition 98, that requires a certain percentage of the state's budget to be directed towards public education.

Prior to implementation of Proposition 13, the state of California saw significant increases in property tax revenue collection "with the share of state and local revenues derived from property taxes increasing from 34% at the turn of the decade to 44% in 1978 (Schwartz 1998)." Proposition 13 caused a sharp decrease in state and local tax collection in its first year.

One measure of K-12 public school spending is the percentage of personal income that a state spends on education. From a peak of about 4.5% for the nation overall, and 4.0% for California, both peaking in the early 1970s, the nation overall as well as California spent declining percentages on public education in the decade from 1975 to 1985. For the longer period of 1970–2008, California had always spent a lower percentage than the rest of the nation on education.

UCSD Economics Professor Julian Betts stated in a 2010 interview: "What all this means for spending is that starting around 1978–1979 we saw a sharp reduction in spending on schools. We fell compared to other states dramatically, and we still haven't really caught up to other states." From 1977 up until 2010, in California there had been a steady growth of class sizes compared to the national average, "which have been decreasing since 1970." During the 1970s, school spending per student was almost equal to the national average. Using discount rate, "measured in 1997–1998 dollars, California spent about $100 more per capita on its public schools in 1969–1970 than did the rest of the country." From 1981 to 1982 up until 2000, California had consistently spent less per student than the rest of the U.S., as demonstrated by data collected by the U.S. Bureau of Economic Analysis and by the Public Policy Institute of California. This resulted in increased pupil-to-teacher ratios in K-12 public schools in California. Professor Betts observed in 2010 that "pupil-teacher ratios start to skyrocket in the years immediately after 1978, and a huge gap opens up between pupil-teacher ratios here and in the rest of the country, and we still haven't recovered from that."

California's voters would approve higher income and capital gains tax rates on the state's wealthiest residents to increase K-12 school funding in subsequent years: voters approved tax increases with Proposition 30 in 2012 (which was extended to 2030 with 2016 California Proposition 55), raising tax rates on income and capital gains over $250,000 for single filers and $500,000 for joint filers, with most of the resultant revenue going to schools. These measures significantly closed the K-12 spending gap between California and the national average. Pupil-teacher ratios decreased since the passage of Proposition 30, and according to a National Education Association survey, California had the second-highest starting teacher salary among the 50 states in 2018. In addition to the Serrano v. Priest decision which equalized school funding between school districts, in 2013, California lawmakers created the Local Control Funding Formula, providing greater resources to school districts with student populations having higher needs, being determined by the rate of children in poverty or foster care and the rate of English language learners in the district, and adding an additional 20% or more in "supplemental funding" to disadvantaged school districts.

== Popularity ==
Proposition 13 is consistently popular among California's likely voters, 64% of whom were homeowners as of 2017. A 2018 survey from the Public Policy Institute of California found that 57% of Californians say that Proposition 13 is mostly a good thing, while 23% say it is mostly a bad thing. 65% of likely voters say it has been mostly a good thing, as do: 71% of Republicans, 55% of Democrats, and 61% of independents; 54% of people age 18 to 34, 52% of people age 35 to 54, and 66% of people 55 and older; 65% of homeowners and 50% of renters. The only demographic group for which less than 50% said that Proposition 13 was mostly a good thing was African Americans, at 39%.

The survey also found that 40% of Californians, and 50% of likely voters said that Proposition 13's supermajority requirement for new special taxes has had a good effect on local government services provided to residents, while 20% of both Californians and likely voters said it had a bad effect, and the remainder felt it had no effect.

At the same time, a majority of both Californians (55%) and likely voters (56%) opposed lowering the supermajority threshold for local special taxes.

=== Third rail ===
Proposition 13 is often considered the "third rail" of California politics, which means that politicians avoid discussions of changing it.

In the 2003 California recall election in which Arnold Schwarzenegger was elected governor, his advisor Warren Buffett suggested that Proposition 13 be repealed or changed as a method of balancing the state's budget. Schwarzenegger, believing that such an act would be inadvisable politically and could end his gubernatorial career, said, "I told Warren that if he mentions Proposition 13 again he has to do 500 sit-ups."

Gavin Newsom, when asked about the fairness of Proposition 13 in a 2010 interview with The Bay Citizen, said: "The political realities are such that Democrats, not just Republicans and Independents, are overwhelmingly opposed to making adjustments in terms of the residential side of Prop. 13. On the commercial and industrial side, there seems to be a lot more openness to debate...Of course, it's a difficult time to do that...when you're trying to encourage manufacturing back into your state, and you already have a cost differential between states that border us, you don't want to now increase their burden in terms of property tax on that commercial and industrial space."

In 2011, California Governor Jerry Brown was quoted as saying that it wasn't Proposition 13 that was the problem, but "It was what the Legislature did after 13, it was what happened after 13 was passed" because the legislature reduced local authorities' power. In a later interview in 2014, he lamented that he hadn't built up a "war chest" with which to campaign for an alternative to Proposition 13. Governor Brown said he'd learned from his failure in the mid-1970s to build a war chest that he could have used to push an alternative to Proposition 13. Governor Brown was definitive that he would not seek to change the law, a third rail in California politics. "Prop. 13 is a sacred doctrine that should never be questioned," he said.

== Amendments ==
=== 1978 Proposition 8 ===
Proposition 8 allows for a reassessment of real property values in a declining market.

=== 1986 Proposition 58 ===
Proposition 58 allowed homeowners to transfer their principal residence to children without a property tax re-assessment, as well as the first $1 million (not indexed to inflation) in assessed value of other real property. It passed with 76% of the vote.

Between Proposition 58 and 1996 Proposition 193, which extends Proposition 58 to grandparents, a 2017 report from California's Legislative Analyst's Office (LAO) found that roughly one out of 20 houses statewide received the exemption in the decade ending in 2015, at an average rate of one out of every 200 houses per year. They estimated total foregone yearly property tax revenue for all exemptions ever received at $1.5 billion in 2015, or about 2.5% of total statewide property tax revenue. The report said that while the exemption made it possible for some to live in their parents' house, it likely incentivized the conversion of inherited houses into rental property or other uses. The report said the exemption probably created downward pressure on rents while causing more Californians to be renters rather than homeowners.

=== 1986 Proposition 60 ===
Proposition 60 allows homeowners over the age of 55 to transfer the assessed value of their present home to a replacement home if the replacement home is located in the same county, is of equal or lesser value, and purchased within two years of sale.

=== 1988 Proposition 90 ===
Proposition 90 was similar to 1986 Proposition 60 in that it allowed homeowners over the age of 55 to transfer the assessed value of their present home to a replacement home if the replacement home was located in a different county, provided the incoming county allowed the transfer.

=== 1996 Proposition 193 ===
Proposition 193 extended 1986 Proposition 58 by allowing grandparents to transfer to their grandchildren their primary residence and up to $1 million (not indexed to inflation) in other real property without a property tax re-assessment, when both parents of the grandchild are deceased. It passed with 67% of the vote.

=== 1996 Proposition 218 ===
Proposition 218, called the "Right to Vote on Taxes Act," is an initiative constitutional amendment approved by California voters on November 5, 1996. Proposition 218 was sponsored by the Howard Jarvis Taxpayers Association as a constitutional follow-up to Proposition 13.

The proposition established constitutional limits on the ability of local governments to levy benefit assessments on real property and property-related fees and charges such as those for utility services to property. The assessment and property-related fee and charge reforms contained in Proposition 218 were in response to California local governments' use of revenue sources that circumvented the two-thirds vote requirement to raise local taxes under Proposition 13.

It also requires voter approval before a local government, including a charter city, may impose, increase, or extend any local tax. It also constitutionally reserves to local voters the right to use the initiative power to reduce or repeal any local tax, assessment, fee or charge, including provision for a significantly reduced petition signature requirement to qualify a measure on the ballot.

=== 2000 Proposition 39 ===
Proposition 39 lowered the required supermajority necessary for voters to impose local school bond acts from two-thirds (2/3) of the votes cast to 55%.

=== 2010 Proposition 26 ===
Proposition 26 added a constitutional definition of "tax" for purposes of the two-thirds legislative vote requirement for state taxes under Proposition 13.

=== 2020 Proposition 19 ===
Following the defeat of Proposition 5 in 2018, the California Association of Realtors sponsored another measure similar to their prior initiative. It appeared on the November 2020 ballot and was approved by voters by a narrow margin. This measure provides reassessment exemptions to all homeowners over the age of 55 moving within the state, for a total of three lifetime moves, financed by narrowing Proposition 58 and Proposition 193 to solely inherited primary residences or farms, with an inflation-adjusted exemption cap of $1 million in market value at the time of death, and requires the heir to continually live in the residence or face reassessment (this requirement does not apply to farm property).

== Failed attempts at change or repeal ==
Since its passage in 1978, there have been many attempts to change Proposition 13 through legislation, legal challenges, and additional ballot measures. In 1992, a legal challenge (Nordlinger v. Hahn) was considered by the United States Supreme Court, which subsequently ruled 8–1 that Proposition 13 didn't violate the Equal Protection clause, and found Nordlinger didn't have standing to raise a Right to Travel claim.

=== Legal challenges ===
==== Amador Valley Joint Union High School District v. State Board of Equalization (1978) ====
Amador Valley Joint Union High School District v. State Board of Equalization was a California Supreme Court case in which the aforementioned school district challenged the constitutionality of Proposition 13. In the ruling, the state's high court confirmed that an initiative cannot "revise" the constitution; Proposition 13, however, was an amendment to the California Constitution and not a revision.

==== Nordlinger v. Hahn (1992) ====
Stephanie Nordlinger had purchased a property in the Los Angeles area in 1988 and, under the provisions of Proposition 13, was required to have the property reassessed at a new value. The reassessed value of Nordlinger's property raised her tax rates by 36%, while her neighbors continued to pay significantly lower rates on their property. Disheartened by the disparity in taxation, Nordlinger viewed this reassessment as favoritism in the eyes of the law and elected to bring charges up on the Los Angeles County Tax Assessment office and its primary assessor, Kenneth Hahn.

Nordlinger subsequently sued the Los Angeles County Tax Assessor Kenneth Hahn on the grounds of the Equal Protection Clause of the Fourteenth Amendment to the U.S. Constitution. The Supreme Court held in Nordlinger v. Hahn that Proposition 13 was constitutional. Justice Harry Blackmun, writing the majority opinion, noted that California had a "legitimate interest in local neighborhood preservation, continuity, and stability" and that it was acceptable to treat owners who have invested for some time in property differently from new owners. One who objected to the rules could choose not to buy.

Nordlinger also raised a right to travel argument—however, justices found that she lacked standing, as she wasn't impeded from moving to California by Proposition 13.

Thirty years after purchasing her house, Nordlinger, now a senior citizen on a limited income, paid $3,400 a year in property taxes on the house, which had increased in value to $900,000.

==== Other legal challenges ====
In December 2011, Charles E. Young, former University of California, Los Angeles chancellor, brought a lawsuit with a team of lawyers headed by William Norris, a retired federal judge of the United States 9th Circuit Court of Appeals. They unsuccessfully sued to overturn the Proposition 13 requirement that a two-thirds (2/3) vote of the Legislature is required to increase state taxes.

=== Recent attempts ===
==== Legislative attempts to close the property transfer loophole (2014, 2015, 2018, and 2020) ====
The property transfer loophole was almost closed in 2014 by a bipartisan coalition in the state legislature but the effort died after progressive politicians, organized labor, and community groups refused to support the effort. In 2015 and 2018, Republican efforts to fix this loophole were stalled by Democratic state legislators in legislative committee. Another Republican attempt to close the loophole was made in 2020. Democrat Don Perata, former California senate leader, said this loophole is left open by his party to create justification for ending Proposition 13.

==== 2018 Proposition 5 ====
Proposition 5 would have extended 1986 California Proposition 60 and 1988 California Proposition 90 by providing property tax savings to all homeowners who are over age 55 (or who meet other qualifications) when they move to a different home. It was sponsored by the California Association of Realtors.

California's Legislative Analyst's Office estimated that this would cost local governments about $100 million per year over the first few years, growing to $1 billion per year (in 2018 dollars) over time.

It was defeated on November 6, 2018, with approximately 58% of voters not in favor.

==== 2020 California Proposition 15 ====
Proposition 15 (also known as split roll) was an initiative constitutional amendment appearing on the November 2020 California statewide ballot that would have raised taxes by amending Proposition 13 to require the reassessment of commercial and industrial properties at market value, including commercial and industrial property owned by a natural person. The measure failed to pass, with 52% of votes cast in opposition to the measure.

Proponents of the measure were outspent by the opposition, with supporters having spent $69 million while opponents spent $74 million. The main donors to Yes on Prop. 15 were the California Teachers Association, multiple chapters of the Service Employees International Union, and the Chan Zuckerberg Advocacy Fund. The main opposition donors were corporate and business oriented groups including the California Business Roundtable, Howard Jarvis Taxpayers Association, the Business Property Association, and the real estate industry.

== See also ==
- 1980 Massachusetts Proposition 2½, the Massachusetts version of Proposition 13, passed in 1980.
- 1990 Oregon Ballot Measure 5, property tax cap in Oregon.
- 1996 California Proposition 218 (Local Initiative Power) relating to the reduction or repeal of local taxes, assessments, fees and charges.
- Homestead exemption in Florida, which includes a property tax cap similar to Proposition 13.
- Mello-Roos Community Facilities Act or simply Mello-Roos, passed in 1982 to address funding shortfalls from Proposition 13.
- Gann Limit, caps on California government budgets resulting from on 1979 Proposition 4, which Paul Gann promoted as "The Spirit of 13."

== Notes ==
Serrano: Serrano v. Priest, 5 Cal.3d 584 (1971) (Serrano I); Serrano v. Priest, 18 Cal.3d 728 (1976) (Serrano II); Serrano v. Priest, 20 Cal.3d 25 (1977) (Serrano III)
