= Gann Limit =

California tax law

Gann Limits, a form of appropriations limit, are caps on government budgets in California. These caps apply to the state government of California and to local governments like cities and school districts. Gann Limits forbid governments from spending more than a certain amount per year. They also forbid governments from bringing in more tax revenue than they would be allowed to spend. With some exceptions, a government that brings in too much tax revenue over a two-year period is required to cut taxes for future years. The limits are adjusted for inflation and population growth.

== Origin ==
Gann Limits are named for Paul Gann, a conservative political activist. Gann co-authored 1978 California Proposition 13, which amended the California Constitution to limit property taxes. After the success of Proposition 13, he led the campaign for the proposition that would restrict government spending even further: 1979 Proposition 4, which Gann promoted as "The Spirit of 13."

Proposition 4 was approved by California voters, adding Gann Limits to the California Constitution in the form of Article XIII B.

== Impact ==
After the passage of Proposition 4, bond agencies lowered California's bond rating. The state of California attributed this to the fiscal uncertainty created by Gann Limits and Proposition 13.

Gann Limits have forced the State of California to rebate money to taxpayers rather than spending it on government programs three times: $1.1 billion in fiscal year 1987–1988, $2.8 billion in fiscal year 2020-2021 (Golden State Stimulus 1), and $6 billion in fiscal year 2021-2022 (Golden State Stimulus II).

In 1988, after the first round of rebates, the California Teachers Association sought to protect school spending from potential cuts. They advocated for the successful Proposition 98, which now requires approximately 40% of the State of California's general fund to be spent on schools. This has ensured a source of school funding, and also further restricted California spending. In 2017, a popular single-payer proposal in California was blocked in the state legislature in part due to budget concerns, including concerns about the limitations imposed by the state Gann Limit and Proposition 98. An analysis of the proposal prepared for the Senate Appropriations Committee found that complying with these constitutional budget limits would be infeasible. A Select Committee on Health Care Delivery Systems and Universal Coverage affirmed this finding.

Due to the fact that other spending mandates are not adjusted for Gann Limits, the California Legislative Analyst's Office has found that the State of California loses $1.60 for every $1.00 that it takes in above its limit. They indicate that this could cause a paradoxical fiscal cliff for the state, where bringing in too much revenue causes funding to be drastically restricted.

== Exceptions ==
Gann Limits do not apply to revenue from fees or regulatory licenses. They also don't apply to appropriations for capital expenses (like construction of a building), debt service, costs mandated by a court order, or the expenses incurred by refunding taxes. Governments can temporarily increase their Gann Limits either through an emergency declaration or a vote of the people.

== See also ==
- 1978 California Proposition 13
- Paul Gann
- Appropriation (Law)
- California ballot proposition
- Howard Jarvis Taxpayers Association
