= California Proposition 64 =

California Proposition 64 may refer to:

- 1986 California Proposition 64
- 2004 California Proposition 64
- 2016 California Proposition 64
