= Paul Gann =

American politician

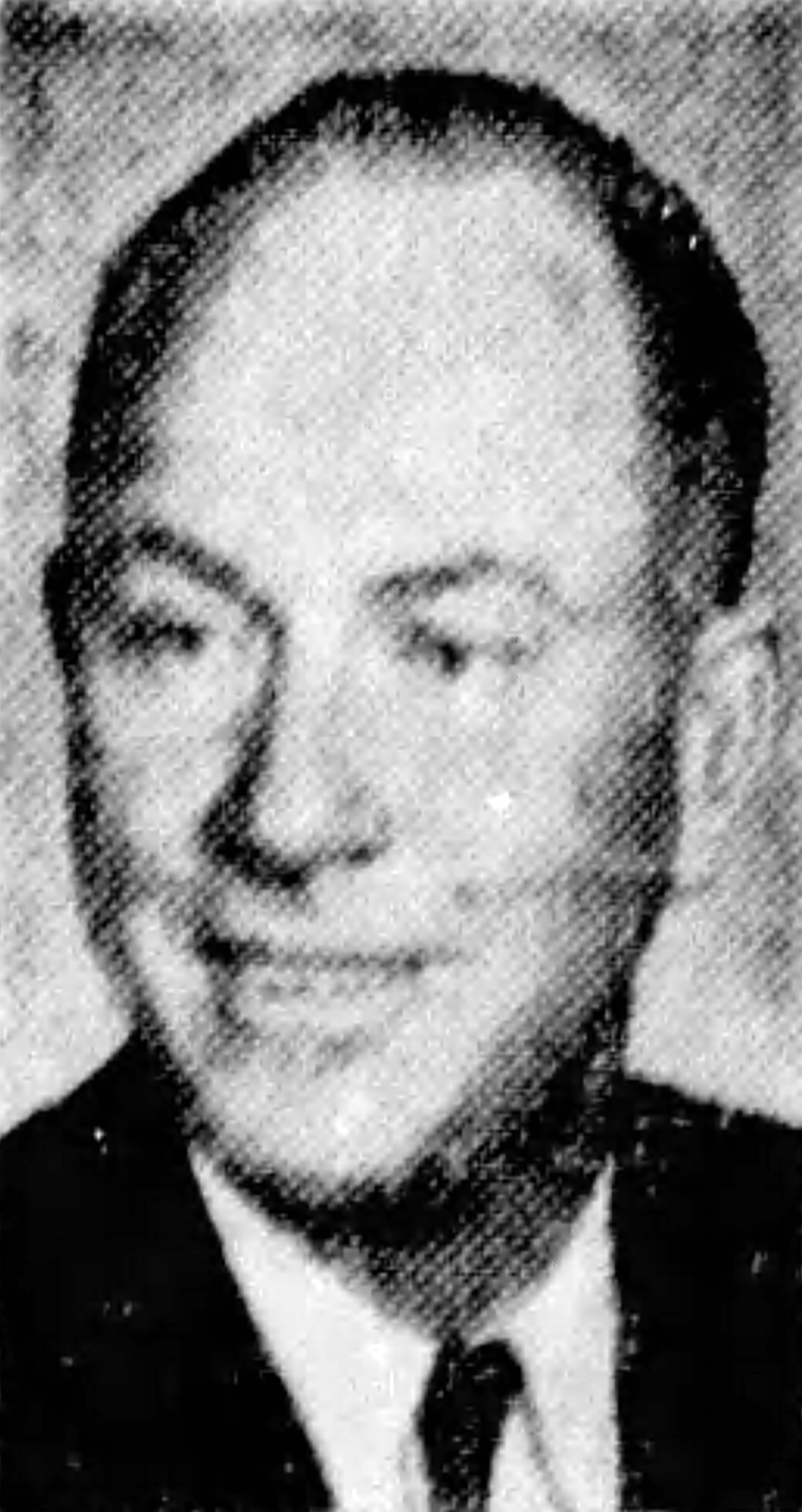
Gann as a candidate for Modesto City Council, 1955

Paul Gann (June 12, 1912 – September 11, 1989) was a Sacramento, California-based conservative political activist and founder of People's Advocate, Inc. Along with Howard Jarvis, Gann was co-author of Proposition 13, a 1978 initiative in California which cut property tax and is credited with sparking "a nationwide tax revolt." In 1979, Gann sponsored Proposition 4, which established what are now called "Gann limits" on state and local spending and giving rise to the broader spending limits of Proposition 98.

Gann was born in Clark County, Arkansas and moved to California in 1935. He was the Republican candidate for United States Senator from California in 1980, but was defeated by the incumbent Democrat, Alan Cranston.

Gann received blood-transfusions during open-heart surgery in 1982, before uniform HIV-antibody blood-screening was in effect. He later tested positive on an HIV test. Ten days after breaking his hip in a fall at his Carmichael home in September 1989, Gann died at Kaiser Permanente Medical Center in Sacramento. He was 77. The hospital announced the cause of death as pneumonia "complicated by his battle against the AIDS virus."

Gann devoted the last years of his life to AIDS treatment advocacy. California's "Paul Gann Blood Safety Act" (California Health and Safety Code Section 1645(b)) took effect in 1990, mandating that physicians discuss the risks of blood transfusion with their patients.

Party political offices
Preceded by H. L. Richardson	Republican Party nominee for United States Senator from California (Class 3); 1980	Succeeded by Ed Zschau
