= 2006 California Proposition 90 =

Failed referendum on government impacts to property

California Proposition 90 was a 2006 ballot initiative in the state of California, United States. Passing of the initiative would have made two changes to California law:

- Eminent domain could not be used by government except to provide facilities for public use, to abate specific public nuisances, and to act in a declared state of emergency. (This was a reaction to the Supreme Court's decision in Kelo v. City of New London.)
- Government would be required to reimburse property owners whose property value is decreased as a result of any government regulation or action.

The measure was defeated by a vote of 47.6% in favor and 52.4% opposed. In the June 2008 election, the more narrowly defined Proposition 99 was passed.

The initiative was similar to the controversial Oregon Ballot Measure 37 (2004).

Proposition 90 results by county No: 70–80%; 60–70%; 50–60%; Yes: 50–60%
