= Rider v. County of San Diego =

1991 California Supreme Court case

- Supreme Court of California

Argued October 9, 1991 Decided December 19, 1991
- Full case name: RICHARD J. RIDER et al., Plaintiffs and Respondents, v. COUNTY OF SAN DIEGO et al., Defendants and Appellants.
- Citation(s): 820 P.2d 1000 (1991); 2 Cal. Rptr. 2d 490; 1 Cal. 4th 1 (1991)

Court membership
- Chief Justice: Malcolm Lucas
- Associate Justices: Armand Arabian, Marvin R. Baxter, Ronald M. George, Joyce L. Kennard, Stanley Mosk, Edward A. Panelli

Case opinions
- Majority: Lucas, joined by Arabian, Baxter, George
- Concurrence: George, joined by Panelli
- Dissent: Mosk, joined by Kennard

Laws applied
- Cal. Const., art. 18 § 4 (Proposition 13)

Rider v. County of San Diego, 1 Cal. 4th 1 (1991) was a California Supreme Court case where the court ruled that a sales tax in San Diego County, California, to fund courthouses and jails was invalid, because it failed to reach a two-thirds voter approval as required by Proposition 13.

== Background ==
In 1978, California voters passed Proposition 13, an amendment (article XIII-A) to the California Constitution that limited the ways that state and local governments could create new taxes. Specifically, section 4 of article XIII-A required the approval of two thirds of voters for "special taxes" proposed by cities, counties, and entities called "special districts."

Seeking additional funding for jails and courthouses, the San Diego County Board of Supervisors in 1985 sought to create a county fund for managing and operating such facilities. However, in the November 1986 election, only 51 percent of county voters approved the fund, well short of a two-thirds requirement for passage as required by Proposition 13. Subsequently, the California State Legislature passed the San Diego County Regional Justice Facility Financing Act in 1987, which was introduced by Assemblymember Larry Stirling (Republican of San Diego), that created the seven-member San Diego County Regional Justice Facility Financing Agency, an agency responsible for creating Proposition A, a sales tax of 0.5 percent in San Diego County that would fund the construction of courthouses and jails. In June 1988, the sales tax won with 50.8 percent approval of county voters. The San Diego County sales tax rose to 7 percent.

== Procedural history ==
Following the June 1988 election, three San Diego County taxpayers filed a lawsuit that challenged the legality of the tax and alleged that the sales tax violated the requirements of a supermajority vote to pass taxes from Proposition 13 (1978) and Proposition 62 (1986). The plaintiffs were Libertarian Party members Richard J. Rider and Pat Wright, and United Taxpayers of San Diego executive vice president Steven Currie.

Judge Gordon Burkhart of the Riverside County Superior Court ruled in the plaintiffs' favor on March 23, 1989. The judge ruled that the sales tax was a "special tax" as defined by Proposition 13 because the tax was not for general use but specifically for judicial facilities.

However, on September 4, 1990, the California Court of Appeal overturned the superior court decision. The appeals court ruled that because the Regional Justice Facility Financing Agency was not empowered to pass property taxes, that agency was not a "special district" as defined by Proposition 13.

The Supreme Court of California heard the case on October 9, 1991. By that month, San Diego County raised over $320 million from the sales tax but was unable to spend the money pending the outcome of the Rider case.

== Decision ==
The California Supreme Court issued the 5–2 decision ruling against the sales tax on December 19, 1991, saying that any entity that is "essentially controlled" by a county or city must follow the two-thirds requirement for special taxes. Chief Justice Malcolm Lucas wrote the majority opinion, joined by Justices Armand Arabian, Marvin R. Baxter, and Ronald M. George. The justices wrote in their majority opinion:

We are sympathetic to the plight of local government in attempting to deal with the ever-increasing demands for revenue in the post-Proposition 13 period, and we are especially reluctant to interfere with sorely needed projects for new and improved courtrooms, criminal detention facilities, and other justice facilities. Yet Proposition 13 and its limitations on local taxation are constitutional mandates of the people which we are sworn to uphold and enforce. Any modification of these mandates must come from the people who, by constitutional amendment, may adopt such changes by a simple majority vote.

Additionally, Justice George wrote a separate, concurring opinion writing in part:

... basing our decision on nonconstitutional grounds not only would be more consistent with well-established principles of judicial restraint, but would avoid the necessity of placing a new "gloss" on the meaning of the term "special district" as interpreted in prior decisions of this court construing Proposition 13.

Giving separate dissents were Justices Stanley Mosk and Joyce L. Kennard. Mosk gave the opinion that the majority opinion broke away from past precedent. Kennard wrote that the San Diego agency that proposed the sales tax "is not a special district subject to the provisions of section 4 of article XIII A of the California Constitution and that the majority's interpretation of the phrase "special taxes" is overbroad."

== Aftermath ==
By the day of the California Supreme Court decision, San Diego County had collected $316 million towards the Proposition A tax.

Nearly a week after the court decision, the San Diego County Board of Supervisors voted on December 30, 1991, to continue collecting the Proposition A sales tax, and Chief Justice Lucas signed an order denying a request by the Libertarian Party to stop collection of the sales tax. In January 1992, a Los Angeles Times poll found that 68 percent of San Diego city residents believed that a sales tax was needed to improve jails and courthouses and that 64 percent supported allowing the county to restore the sales tax.

On February 13, 1992, the California Supreme Court declined to review this decision. As a result, Proposition A was abolished, and the sales tax rate in San Diego County dropped from 8.25 to 7.75 percent.

Then on December 23, 1992, the California Fourth District Court of Appeal unanimously ruled that over $380 million in Proposition A taxes could be refunded to San Diego County taxpayers but rejected an argument to issue refunds through reducing sales taxes by half a cent. The refund process was considered confusing and unenforceable, as there was no mechanism to compel merchants to issue sales tax refunds to consumers, for instance.

The California Supreme Court ruled again on Proposition A on March 25, 1993, declining to hear a petition challenging the Proposition A refund process. Later that year, the California Legislature passed a bill to facilitate a rebate of this sales tax to county taxpayers, by both reducing the county sales tax by $0.0075 effective April 1994 and issuing direct tax refunds from the state for documented purchases of $5,000 or more made between January 1, 1989, and February 13, 1992. Governor Pete Wilson signed the bill into law on October 11, 1993.

Rider says that this case reduced taxes by $3.5 billion in San Diego County and $14 billion statewide.
