= 1980 United States Senate election in California =

- November 3, 1980
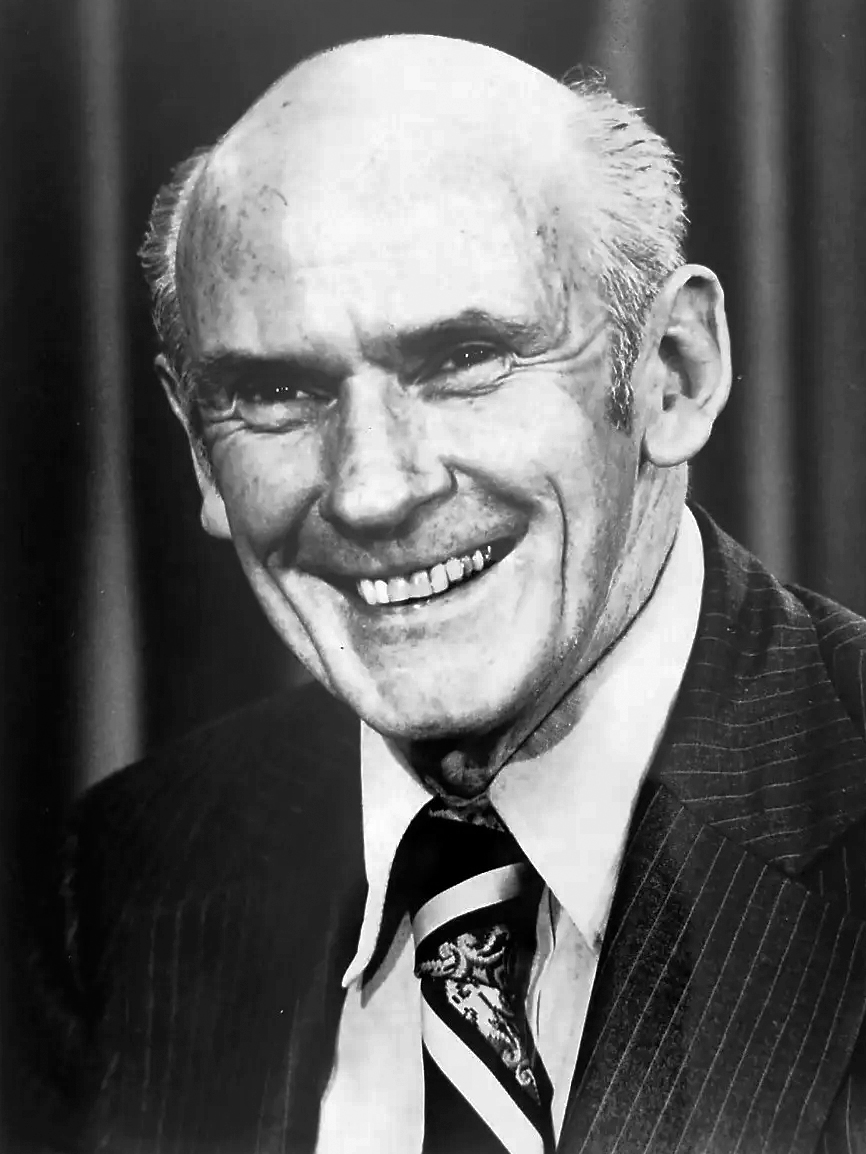

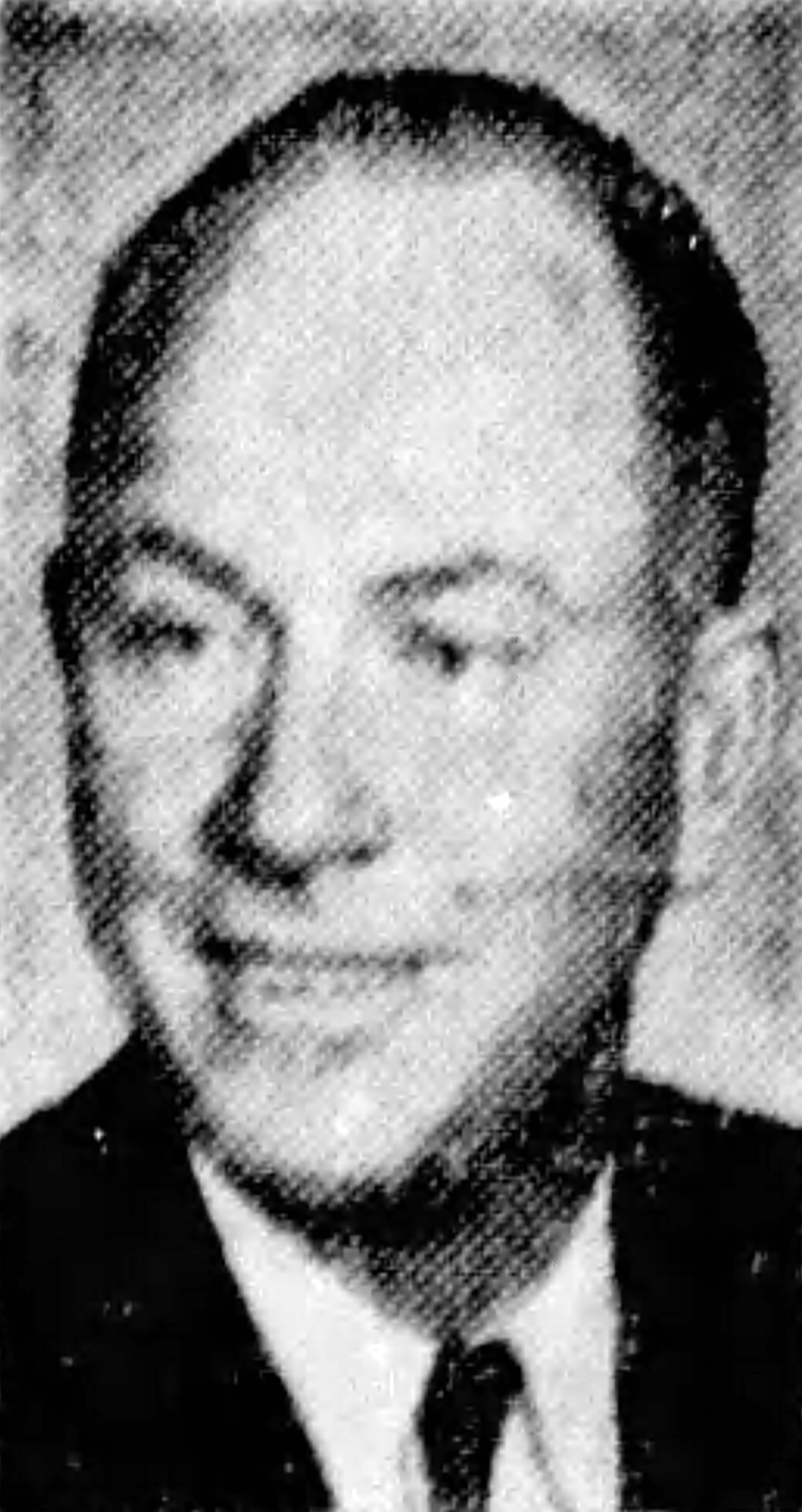
Nominee	Alan Cranston	Paul Gann
Party	Democratic	Republican
Popular vote	4,705,399	3,093,426
Percentage	56.51%	37.15%
- County results Cranston: 40–50% 50–60% 60–70% 70–80% Gann: 40–50% 50–60%
U.S. senator before election
Alan Cranston
Democratic
Elected U.S. Senator
Alan Cranston
Democratic

The 1980 United States Senate election in California took place on November 4, 1980. Incumbent Democrat U.S. Senator Alan Cranston easily won re-election to a third term, even as the state's former Republican governor, Ronald Reagan, won a landslide victory in the concurrent presidential election, and a target of the National Conservative Political Action Committee.

== Primary elections ==
Primary elections were held on June 3, 1980.

=== Democratic primary ===
==== Candidates ====
- Alan Cranston, incumbent United States Senator
- Richard Morgan
- David Rees
- Frank L. Thomas

==== Results ====
Democratic primary results
Party	Candidate	Votes	%
Democratic	Alan Cranston (incumbent)	2,608,746	79.91%
Democratic	Richard Morgan	350,394	10.73%
Democratic	Frank L. Thomas	195,351	5.98%
Democratic	David Rees	110,125	3.37%
Independent	Write-ins	26	0.00%
Total votes		3,264,642	100.00

=== Republican primary ===
==== Candidates ====
- Paul Gann, political activist
- Rayburn Hanzlik, former Nixon and Ford staffer
- Brian Hyndman
- John G. Schmitz, State Senator and American Independent Party candidate for president in 1972
- Philip Schwartz
- Sam Yorty, former Mayor of Los Angeles, and Democratic nominee in 1954
- James A. Ware, nominee for Controller in 1978

==== Results ====
Republican primary results
Party	Candidate	Votes	%
Republican	Paul Gann	934,433	40.00%
Republican	Sam Yorty	668,583	28.62%
Republican	John G. Schmitz	442,839	18.96%
Republican	James A. Ware	95,155	4.07%
Republican	Rayburn Hanzlik	76,268	3.27%
Republican	Philip Schwartz	68,790	2.95%
Republican	Brian Hyndman	50,122	2.15%
Total votes		2,336,190	100.00

== General election ==
=== Endorsements ===
Alan Cranston (D)

Newspapers

- Monterey Peninsula Herald
Paul Gann (R)

Newspapers

- Santa Maria Times

=== Results ===
1980 United States Senate election, California
Party	Candidate	Votes	%
Democratic	Alan Cranston (incumbent)	4,705,399	56.51%
Republican	Paul Gann	3,093,426	37.15%
Libertarian	David Bergland	202,481	2.43%
Peace and Freedom	David Wald	196,354	2.36%
American Independent	James C. Griffin	129,648	1.56%
Democratic hold			

=== Results by county ===
County	Alan Cranston Democratic		Paul Gann Republican		Various candidates Other parties		Margin		Total votes cast
County	#	%	#	%	#	%	#	%	Total votes cast
Alameda	273,332	66.8%	108,790	26.6%	27,079	6.6%	164,542	40.2%	409,201
Alpine	242	53.3%	169	37.2%	43	9.5%	73	16.1%	454
Amador	4,591	48.4%	4,112	43.4%	775	8.2%	479	5.0%	9,478
Butte	31,359	48.5%	28,014	43.3%	5,284	8.2%	3,345	5.2%	64,657
Calaveras	4,484	46.1%	4,257	43.8%	977	10.0%	227	2.3%	9,718
Colusa	2,579	56.2%	1,562	34.1%	445	9.7%	1,017	22.1%	4,586
Contra Costa	170,685	60.3%	95,943	33.9%	16,371	5.7%	74,742	26.4%	282,999
Del Norte	3,255	50.7%	2,384	37.1%	782	12.2%	871	13.6%	6,421
El Dorado	16,305	45.6%	16,345	45.7%	3,112	8.8%	-40	-0.1%	35,762
Fresno	94,164	60.4%	54,073	34.7%	7,739	5.0%	40,091	25.7%	155,976
Glenn	4,079	49.9%	3,618	44.2%	482	5.9%	461	5.7%	8,179
Humboldt	27,698	57.9%	15,610	32.6%	4,540	9.5%	12,088	25.3%	47,848
Imperial	12,946	59.2%	7,355	33.6%	1,568	7.2%	5,591	25.6%	21,869
Inyo	3,179	40.2%	4,172	52.8%	555	7.1%	-993	-12.6%	7,906
Kern	66,943	55.6%	44,997	37.4%	8,419	7.0%	21,946	18.2%	120,359
Kings	11,089	59.2%	6,634	35.4%	1,066	5.4%	4,455	23.8%	18,729
Lake	8,723	52.9%	6,543	39.7%	1,213	7.4%	2,180	13.2%	16,479
Lassen	4,220	54.2%	2,872	36.9%	695	8.9%	1,348	17.3%	7,787
Los Angeles	1,348,919	57.0%	894,712	37.8%	123,557	5.2%	454,207	19.2%	2,367,188
Madera	10,562	58.1%	6,505	35.8%	1,103	6.1%	4,057	22.3%	18,170
Marin	68,464	64.3%	30,921	29.1%	7,011	6.6%	37,453	35.2%	106,396
Mariposa	2,879	52.4%	2,171	39.5%	445	8.0%	708	12.9%	5,495
Mendocino	15,744	56.9%	9,013	32.6%	2,920	10.6%	6,731	24.3%	27,677
Merced	20,053	59.5%	10,590	31.4%	3,044	9.0%	9,463	28.1%	33,687
Modoc	1,784	45.7%	1,848	47.3%	273	6.9%	-64	-1.6%	3,905
Mono	1,459	43.6%	1,609	48.1%	275	8.2%	-150	-4.5%	3,343
Monterey	52,180	62.0%	26,966	32.0%	5,057	6.0%	25,214	30.0%	84,203
Napa	23,503	56.7%	15,369	37.1%	2,588	6.2%	8,134	19.6%	41,460
Nevada	10,252	40.9%	12,080	48.2%	2,722	10.9%	-1,828	-7.3%	25,054
Orange	335,720	43.8%	380,762	49.7%	49,470	6.5%	-45,042	-5.9%	765,952
Placer	24,373	49.0%	20,950	42.1%	4,429	8.9%	3,423	6.9%	49,752
Plumas	3,654	48.5%	2,972	39.4%	913	12.0%	682	9.1%	7,539
Riverside	121,407	50.7%	103,583	43.2%	14,650	6.1%	17,824	7.5%	239,640
Sacramento	178,243	56.7%	110,579	35.2%	25,467	8.0%	67,664	21.5%	314,289
San Benito	4,612	65.2%	1,930	27.3%	537	7.6%	2,682	37.9%	7,079
San Bernardino	143,992	50.9%	123,024	43.5%	15,964	5.7%	20,968	7.4%	282,980
San Diego	361,742	54.0%	266,877	39.8%	41,335	6.2%	94,865	14.2%	669,954
San Francisco	188,239	75.6%	46,415	18.6%	14,481	5.8%	141,824	57.0%	249,135
San Joaquin	62,183	54.4%	45,208	39.6%	6,899	6.0%	16,975	14.8%	114,290
San Luis Obispo	38,995	57.4%	23,863	35.1%	5,136	7.6%	15,132	22.3%	67,994
San Mateo	145,208	63.6%	61,810	27.1%	21,244	9.3%	83,398	36.5%	228,262
Santa Barbara	73,570	58.6%	44,451	35.4%	7,443	6.0%	29,119	23.2%	125,464
Santa Clara	280,732	60.8%	150,423	32.6%	30,728	6.6%	130,309	28.2%	461,883
Santa Cruz	53,679	64.3%	22,917	27.4%	6,921	8.2%	30,762	36.9%	83,517
Shasta	26,785	57.5%	16,482	35.4%	3,323	7.2%	10,303	22.1%	46,590
Sierra	880	54.7%	582	36.2%	146	9.1%	298	18.5%	1,608
Siskiyou	8,742	54.5%	6,029	37.6%	1,282	8.0%	2,713	16.9%	16,053
Solano	45,910	58.5%	27,072	34.5%	5,441	7.0%	18,838	24.0%	78,423
Sonoma	75,239	61.1%	38,797	31.5%	9,010	7.4%	36,442	29.6%	123,046
Stanislaus	42,669	54.8%	27,422	35.2%	7,736	9.9%	15,277	19.6%	77,857
Sutter	7,459	44.3%	7,617	45.2%	1,758	10.5%	-158	-0.9%	16,834
Tehama	8,236	54.2%	5,713	37.6%	1,235	8.2%	2,523	16.6%	15,184
Trinity	2,887	53.2%	1,964	36.2%	571	10.5%	923	17.0%	5,422
Tulare	38,099	55.4%	27,084	39.4%	3,566	5.2%	11,015	16.0%	68,749
Tuolumne	8,177	52.2%	6,358	40.6%	1,135	7.2%	1,819	11.6%	15,670
Ventura	91,104	48.6%	84,379	45.0%	11,975	6.4%	6,725	3.6%	187,458
Yolo	30,617	63.5%	13,218	27.4%	4,391	9.1%	17,399	36.1%	48,226
Yuba	6,544	48.6%	5,711	42.4%	1,217	9.0%	833	6.2%	13,472
Total	4,705,399	56.5%	3,093,426	37.1%	528,656	6.3%	1,611,973	19.4%	8,327,481

Counties that flipped from Democratic to Republican

- El Dorado
- Modoc
- Mono
- Nevada
- Orange
- Sutter

== See also ==
- 1980 United States Senate elections
