= 1986 California Proposition 60 =

Referendum on property tax assessment

Proposition 63
- November 4, 1986
- TAXATION. REPLACEMENT RESIDENCES.

Results
Choice	Votes	%
Yes	5,121,859	77.02%
No	1,528,254	22.98%
County results
Yes
80–90%
70–80%
60–70%
50–60%

California Proposition 60 was an amendment of the Constitution of California relating to property tax assessments for older homeowners. It was proposed by the California State Legislature and approved by voters in a referendum held on November 4, 1986.

The amendment allows homeowners over the age of 55 to transfer the assessed value of their present home to a replacement home if the replacement home is located in the same county, is of equal or lesser value than the original property, and purchased or newly constructed within two years of the sale of the present property.

== See also ==
- California Proposition 13 (1978)
- California Proposition 90 (1988)
