= 1986 California Proposition 63 =

Referendum making English the official state language

Proposition 63
- November 4, 1986
- Official State Language

Results
Choice	Votes	%
Yes	5,138,577	73.25%
No	1,876,639	26.75%
County results
Yes
80–90%
70–80%
60–70%
50–60%

The 1986 Proposition 63, titled Official State Language, was a proposition in the state of California on the November 4, 1986 ballot. The ballot initiative created Article III, Section 6 of the California Constitution and made English the official language of the state. The measure passed with 73.25% of the vote. Due to superseding federal laws and complete absence since 1986 of supporting state legislation that would be necessary for it to take effect, the provision is effectively null and was later designated as merely "advisory" by the state attorney general.

== Ballot summary ==
The ballot summary included the following text:

Provides that English is the official language of the state of California; requires the legislature to enforce this provision by appropriate legislation; charges the legislature with preserving and enhancing the role of English as the common language of the state, requiring that no law may be passed that ignores or diminishes this role; and provides for any resident or person doing business in the state to sue the state to enforce these provisions.

== See also ==
- List of California ballot propositions 1980-1989
- 1998 California Proposition 227
- 2016 California Proposition 58
- Languages of the United States
- Modern English
