= 1978 California Proposition 8 =

Relating to the reassessment of property value

Proposition 8 (or Senate Constitutional Amendment No. 67) was an amendment of the Constitution of California relating to the assessment of property values. It was proposed by the California State Legislature and approved by voters in a referendum held on 7 November 1978.

The amendment was necessitated by the passage of Proposition 13 in June of the same year. Proposition 8 allowed for a reassessment of real property values in a declining market. For this purpose it amended Article 13A of the state constitution, which had been added by Proposition 13. Today a reassessment based on a decline in market value is called a "Proposition 8" reassessment.

Results by county: Yes: 50–60%; 60–70%; 70–80%; 80–90%; No: 50–60%
