= California Building Industry Association =

US trade association

- Abbreviation: CBIA
- Formation: 1943
- Purpose: Representation of the interests of builders and developers of housing and commercial projects
- Headquarters: Sacramento
- Location: United States
- President/CEO: Dan Dunmoyer
- Subsidiaries: The Building Industry Institute; The California Homebuilding Foundation
- Website: cbia.org
- Formerly called: California Home Builders Council; California Builders Council

The California Building Industry Association is a statewide trade association based in Sacramento representing thousands of member companies including homebuilders, trade contractors, architects, engineers, designers, suppliers and industry professionals in the homebuilding, multi-family and mixed-use development markets. CBIA members build nearly 9 out of 10 new housing units built in California, including charity homes, legally defined as affordable housing, middle-class market-rate housing and luxury homes.

Dan Dunmoyer is the current President and CEO of the organization.

== History ==
The CBIA was established in 1943 as a federation of local and regional associations representing builders at the state level and functioned solely as a lobbying organization. In 1952, the organization incorporated as the California Home Builders Council. In 1968, the organization changed its name to the California Builders Council. In 1977, the organization became a full-service state level association. In 1978, the organization changed its name to the California Building Industry Association. There are now 10 regional affiliates.

Since 1977, a political action committee (PAC) and two subsidiary organizations have been established. The Building Industry Institute was created in 1994 and is involved in researching strategies to benefit the building industry. The California Homebuilding Foundation is an educational foundation that promotes the continued education of individuals and organizations interested in the building industry. The CHF also funds research to benefit the building industry. In addition to lobbying, the CBIA has incorporated technical, membership, insurance, and educational departments.

The CBIA sponsors the Pacific Coast Builders Conference, a regional building conference and trade show which draws thousands of attendees and exhibitors each year.

== Press ==
In 2008, the CBIA ended a consulting agreement with Alan Nevin, a San Diego economist.

In 2010, the CBIA objected to a proposed Los Angeles law that would require new homes, larger developments, and some redevelopment projects to prevent stormwater runoff from reaching the ocean. According to the Los Angeles Times, "The law was designed to mitigate the negative effects of urbanization by controlling runoff at its source with small, cost-effective natural systems instead of treatment facilities. Reducing runoff improves water quality and recharges groundwater...Under the ordinance, builders would be required to use rainwater storage tanks, permeable pavement, infiltration swales or curb bump-outs to manage the water where it falls. Builders unable to manage 100% of a project's runoff on site would be required to pay a penalty of $13 a gallon of runoff not handled there -- a requirement the Building Industry Association has been fighting."

== See also ==
- Building Industry Association of Southern California, Orange County Chapter
