= 1986 California Proposition 65 =

Initiative on toxic substances

Proposition 65
- November 4, 1986
- RESTRICTIONS ON TOXIC DISCHARGES INTO DRINKING WATER; REQUIREMENT OF NOTICE OF PERSONS' EXPOSURE TO TOXICS

Results
Choice	Votes	%
Yes	4,400,471	62.57%
No	2,632,617	37.43%
County results
Yes
70–80%
60–70%
50–60%
No
60–70%
50–60%

Proposition 65 (formally titled The Safe Drinking Water and Toxic Enforcement Act of 1986, and also referred to as Prop 65) is a California law passed by direct voter initiative in 1986 by a 63%–37% vote. Its goals are to protect drinking water sources from toxic substances that cause cancer or birth defects and to reduce or eliminate exposures to those chemicals generally, such as in consumer products, by requiring warnings in advance of those exposures, with the intended goal being that companies choose to reformulate their products without the substances rather than simply providing notice of such substances in their product.

== The proposition ==
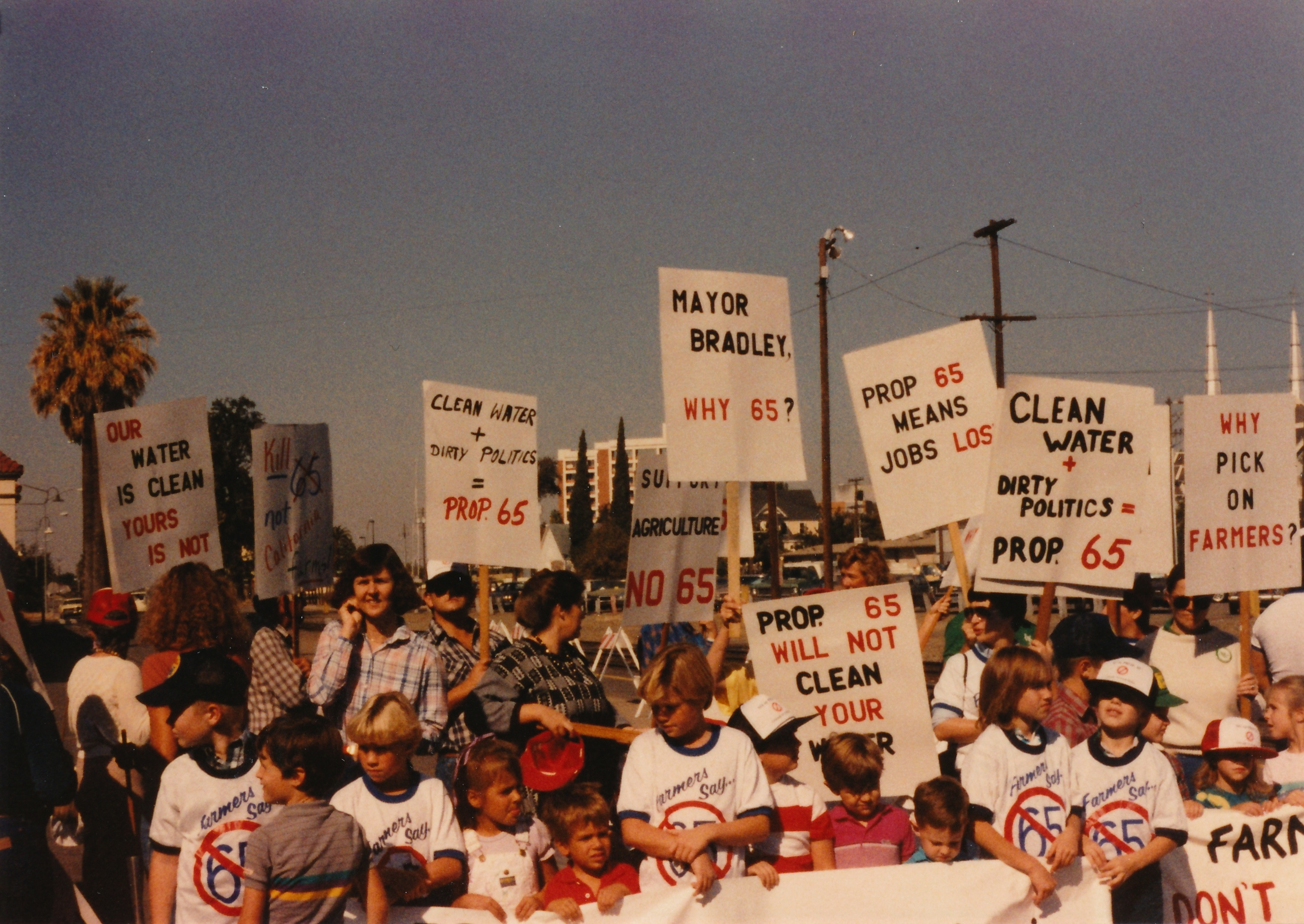
1986 protest against Proposition 65

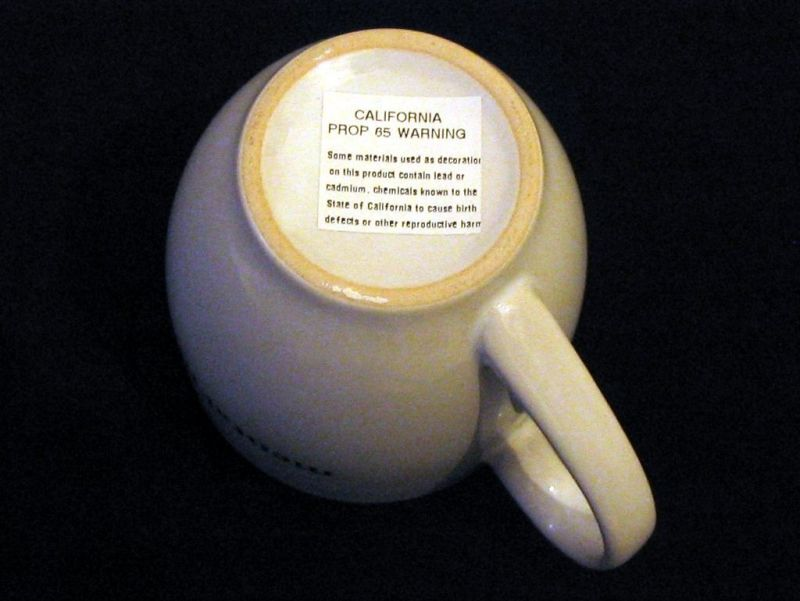
California Proposition 65 warning before August 31, 2018

In 1986, political strategists including Tom Hayden and his wife, environmental activist Jane Fonda, thought that an initiative addressing toxic pollutants would bring more left leaning voters to the polls to help Democrat Tom Bradley in his gubernatorial race against incumbent Republican George Deukmejian, who had vetoed several pollution cleanup bills. Hayden and others funded the initiative, and found three environmental attorneys to write it, including David Roe who did not expect it to pass. Voters passed it 2–1, but did not elect Bradley.

The act states: "no person in the course of doing business shall knowingly discharge or release a chemical known to the state to cause cancer or reproductive toxicity into water" or into anywhere that feeds a drinking water source. It also says that "no person in the course of doing business shall knowingly and intentionally expose" anyone to those chemicals "without first giving clear and reasonable warning."

Proposition 65 is administered by CalEPA's California Office of Environmental Health Hazard Assessment (OEHHA). Proposition 65 regulates substances officially listed by California as causing cancer or birth defects or other reproductive harm, in two ways. The first statutory requirement of Proposition 65 prohibits businesses from knowingly discharging listed substances into drinking water sources, or onto land where the substances can pass into drinking water sources. The second prohibits businesses from knowingly exposing individuals to listed substances without providing a clear and reasonable warning. The requirements apply to amounts above what would present a 1-in-100,000 risk of cancer assuming lifetime exposure (for carcinogens), or above one thousandth (1/1000) of the no observable effect level (for reproductive toxins).

An official list of substances covered by Proposition 65 is maintained and made publicly available. Chemicals are added to or removed from the official list based on California's analysis of current scientific information. All substances listed show their known risk factors, a unique CAS chemical classification number, the date they were listed, and, if so, whether they have been delisted. As a result of lawsuits, the list now also contains substances known only to cause cancer in animals, and as of 2020, contains over 900 substances.

Proposition 65 has had limited success in reducing exposures to known toxic chemicals, especially in consumer products, and its successes illustrate gaps in the effectiveness of federal toxics laws (see § Accomplishments below). It remains politically controversial even after more than 30 years (see § Controversy and abuse below), in large part because it, in effect, requires businesses to know the scientific safety level for specific cancer- and birth defect-causing chemicals that those businesses are intentionally exposing members of the public to, unless government has already set those levels. (Note: No warning is required as long as exposure is below the safety level for the specific chemical in question. However, the business responsible for causing exposure to a known chemical causing cancer or birth defects must be able to prove that safety line if the government has not already drawn it.) According to the California Environmental Protection Agency, "Proposition 65 has... increased public awareness about the adverse effects of exposures to listed chemicals.... [and] provided an incentive for manufacturers to remove listed chemicals from their products.... Although Proposition 65 has benefited Californians, it has come at a cost for companies doing business in the state."

== Enforcement ==
Enforcement is carried out through civil lawsuits against Proposition 65 violators. These lawsuits may be brought by the California Attorney General, any district attorney, or certain city attorneys (those in cities with a population exceeding 750,000). Lawsuits may also be brought by private parties "acting in the public interest," but only after providing notice of the alleged violation to the Attorney General, the appropriate district attorney and city attorney, and the business accused of the violation.

A Proposition 65 Notice of Violation must provide adequate information to allow the recipient to assess the nature of the alleged violation. A notice must comply with the information and procedural requirements specified in regulations. A private party may not pursue an enforcement action directly under Proposition 65 if one of the government officials noted above initiates an action within sixty days of the notice. After 2003, private enforcers must also serve a certificate of merit (statement of expert consultation(s) supporting belief of reasonable and meritorious private action) as a means of preventing frivolous enforcement actions.

A business found to be in violation of Proposition 65 is subject to civil penalties of up to $2,500 per day for each violation. In addition, the business may be ordered by a court of law to stop committing the violation. Other penalties may apply, including unfair business practices violations as limited under California Proposition 64 (2004).

From 1988 (when the initiative went into effect) until 2020, there have been more than 30,000 violation claims, targeting over 100,000 products, filed by citizen prosecutors. From 2000 to 2020, businesses paid more than $370 million in settlements, with almost three quarters of that amount going to attorneys, and the majority of that going to a small group of perpetual litigants. One example cited by the Los Angeles Times is that of the for-profit company "Safe Products for Californians", run by Kenneth Moore and his lawyer ex-wife Tanya Moore, who received almost $700,000 in legal fees from over 100 lawsuits (half against Amazon sellers) in which Kenneth was her only client.

If a company's product contains a chemical on the list, but the intended use of the product would not expose the customer to the hazards found by scientific research (for example, a topical soap that contains a chemical known to cause cancer when eaten), the burden is placed on the company to prove that its product will not cause harm if it chooses not to label the product. Many companies therefore find it less expensive to simply add the Prop 65 warning to their products, regardless of the danger to the consumer.

== Accomplishments ==
Proposition 65 has caused large numbers of consumer products to be reformulated to remove toxic ingredients, both through settlements of enforcement actions and through manufacturers avoiding certain materials so they do not need to put a Prop 65 warning on their products. The addition of new chemicals to the Prop 65 list correlates with a shift in nationwide samples of blood and urine, reducing concentration of listed chemicals and increase in close substitutes.

Proposition 65 has also caused government and industry to cooperate on scientific issues of chemical risk, resulting in risk-based standards for 282 toxic chemicals in the law's first few years of operation, an accomplishment described by a Governor's Task Force as "100 years of progress [by federal standards] in the areas of hazard identification, risk assessment, and exposure assessment." The existence of clear numerical standards has significantly assisted efforts to comply with the law, and to enforce it in situations of non-compliance.

== Warning label ==
Warning label since August 31, 2018

The following warning language is standard on products sold in California if they contain chemicals on the Proposition 65 list and the amount of exposure caused by the product is not within defined safety limits:

WARNING: This product contains chemicals known to the State of California to cause cancer and birth defects or other reproductive harm.

The wording can be changed as necessary, as long as it communicates that the chemical in question is known to the state to cause cancer, or birth defects or other reproductive harm. For exposures from other sources, such as car exhaust in a parking garage, a standard sign might read: "This area contains chemicals known to the State of California to cause cancer, or birth defects or other reproductive harm".

== Controversy and abuse ==
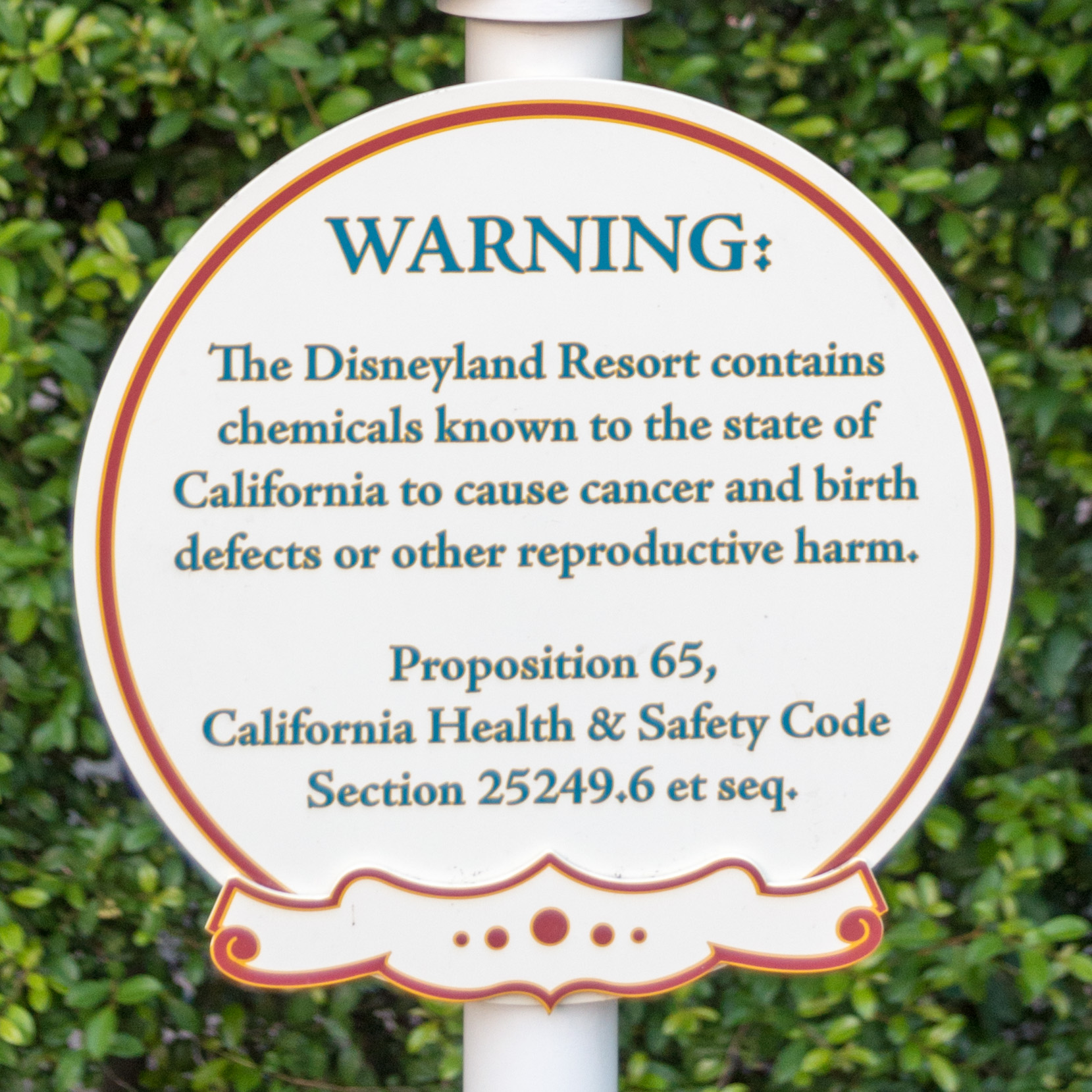
A Prop. 65 warning sign at Disneyland Resort

Political controversy over the law, including industry attempts to have it preempted by federal law, has died down, although preemption bills continue to be introduced in the U.S. Congress, most recently H.R. 6022 (introduced June 6, 2018). However, enforcement actions remain controversial. Many Proposition 65 complaints are filed on behalf of straw man plaintiffs by private attorneys, some of whose businesses are built entirely on filing Proposition 65 lawsuits.

The law has also been criticized for causing "over-warning" or "meaningless warnings," and this risk has been recognized by a California court. There is no penalty for posting an unnecessary warning sign, and to the extent that warnings are vague or overused, they may not communicate much information to the end user. Many companies now routinely attach Prop 65 warning labels to any product of theirs that they think might possibly contain one of the 900 listed chemicals without testing to see whether the chemical is really present in their product and without reformulating their product, because it is cheaper to do so than to run the risk of being sued by Prop 65 enforcers.

Examples of warning signs can be found at gas stations, hardware suppliers, grocery stores, drug stores, medical facilities, parking garages, hotels, apartment complexes, retail stores, banks, and restaurants, warning about hazardous chemicals in items for sale, or present in the immediate environment. Utility companies mail a Prop 65 notice to all customers each year to warn them about exposures to natural gas, petroleum products and sandblasting. Until 2025, food manufacturers and restaurants were required to display Proposition 65 warnings for foods containing acrylamide, which is formed naturally via the Maillard reaction when starchy foods like potatoes are cooked.

Abuse of enforcement lawsuits has also been a consistent theme of Proposition 65 opponents, who criticize the motives of citizen enforcers. Industry critics and corporate defense lawyers charge that Proposition 65 is "a clever and irritating mechanism used by litigious NGOs and others to publicly spank politically incorrect opponents ranging from the American gun industry to seafood retailers, etc." Critics also note that the majority of settlement money collected from businesses has been used to pay plaintiffs' attorney fees. Businesses paid over $14.58 million in attorney fees and costs in 2012, 71% of all settlement money paid.

Because the law allows private citizens to sue and collect penalties from any business violating the law, lawyers and law firms have been criticized for using Proposition 65 to force monetary settlements out of Californian businesses. In the past the Attorney General's office has cited several instances of settlements where plaintiff attorneys received significant awards without providing for environmental benefit to the people of California, resulting in a requirement that the Attorney General's office must approve any pre-trial Proposition 65 settlement.

== Reform efforts ==
In the 2013–14 session of the California State Assembly, a consensus bill, AB 227, introduced by Assemblyman Mike Gatto (D-Los Angeles), effectively offered to protect certain small companies in specified circumstances from the threat of citizen enforcement lawsuits, by providing them with a streamlined compliance procedure and limited penalties. The bill was passed unanimously, with support from Proposition 65 proponents and supporters, and was enacted on October 10, 2013.

Following the success of AB 227, Gov. Jerry Brown announced on May 7, 2013, that his office planned to introduce a proposal to reform Proposition 65. In 2017, Brown advocated for more reform to Prop 65 to reduce "frivolous shakedown lawsuits."

== Alleged violators ==
As of 2019, the below list includes some of the named Fortune 500 companies that have been sued or received an intent to sue for allegedly not disclosing the Prop 65 warning on one or more of their products:

- Amazon
- CVS
- Walmart
- Target
- Walgreens
- Disney
- Dollar General
- Whole Foods
- McDonald's (with Burger King, settled for US$3 million in 2002)

As of August 2019, Amazon has received over 1,000 notices of "Intent to Sue" under Prop 65. Amazon require their sellers to disclose if their products contain Prop 65 chemicals, but some have allegedly not done so.

== List of chemicals ==
Proposition 65 requires that the governor revise and republish at least once per year the list of chemicals known to the State to cause cancer or reproductive toxicity. It also requires substances identified by the International Agency for Research on Cancer (IARC) as causing cancer in humans or laboratory animals to be added to the list.

There also exists a "Safe harbor List" with tolerance thresholds for some of the chemicals named in the Proposition 65 list. Concentrations under the tolerance threshold do not legally require the warning label.

== See also ==
- California ballot proposition
- Environmentalism
- Pollution
- Toxicity
