= 1988 California Proposition 90 =

Referendum on property tax assessment

Proposition 90
- November 8, 1988
- Assessed Valuation. Commission on Replacement Dwellings.

Results
Choice	Votes	%
Yes	6,080,268	69.12%
No	2,716,732	30.88%
County results
Yes
80–90%
70–80%
60–70%
50–60%

California Proposition 90 was an amendment of the Constitution of California relating to property tax assessments for older homeowners. It was proposed by the California State Legislature and approved by voters in a referendum held on November 8, 1988.

The amendment allows homeowners over the age of 55 to transfer the assessed value of their present home to a replacement home if the replacement home is located in another county, is of equal or lesser value than the original property, if the county of the replacement dwelling adopts an ordinance participating in the program.

The following counties allow for Proposition 90 transfers into the county: Alameda, El Dorado, Los Angeles, Orange, Riverside, San Bernardino, San Diego, San Mateo, Santa Clara, Tuolumne, and Ventura. The county of El Dorado will stop taking property tax transfers through Proposition 90 on December 12, 2018.

== See also ==
- California Proposition 13 (1978)
- California Proposition 60 (1986)
