= 2004 California Proposition 64 =

Referendum on lawsuits

Proposition 64 was a California ballot proposition on the November 2, 2004 ballot. It passed with 6,571,694 (59.0%) votes in favor and 4,578,725 (41.0%) against. It was an initiative statute that limited the California law on unfair competition by restricting private lawsuits against a company only to those where an individual is injured by and suffers a financial loss due to an unfair, unlawful, or fraudulent business practice and providing that otherwise only public prosecutors may file lawsuits charging unfair business practices.

A group of over 20 businesses including the California Motor Car Dealers Association, Alliance for Automotive Innovation, the U.S. Chamber of Commerce, Intel, Anthem, and many more spent over $14.5 million on passing the proposition. A second group led by the California Motor Car Dealers Association, separately, raised almost $6 million.

Proponents claimed that the measure would limit "frivolous lawsuits" against companies, which they claimed result mainly in a windfall for lawyers rather than consumers. Proponents also said businesses ultimately must pass along their costs in the form of higher prices to consumers.

Opponents charged that the proposition was heavily funded by businesses who wanted to weaken consumer rights by limiting Californians' ability to enforce environmental, public health, and consumer protection laws such as 1986's Proposition 65.

Proposition 64 results by county Yes: 60–70%; 50–60%; No: 60–70%; 50–60%

== Official summary ==
- Limits individual's right to sue by allowing private enforcement of unfair business competition laws only if that individual was injured by, and suffered financial/property loss because of, an unfair business practice.
- Requires private representative claims to comply with procedural requirements applicable to class action lawsuits.
- Authorizes only the California Attorney General or local government prosecutors to sue on behalf of general public to enforce unfair business competition laws.
- Limits use of monetary penalties recovered by Attorney General or local government prosecutors to enforcement of consumer protection laws.

Summary of Legislative Analyst's Estimate of Net State and Local Government Fiscal Impact:

- Unknown state costs or savings depending on whether the measure significantly increases or decreases court workload related to unfair competition lawsuits and the extent to which funds diverted by this measure are replaced.
- Unknown potential costs to local governments depending on the extent to which funds diverted by this measure are replaced.

== See also ==
- Tort reform
