= 1986 California Proposition 64 =

Referendum on the rights of AIDS patients

Proposition 64
- November 4, 1986
- ACQUIRED IMMUNE DEFICIENCY SYNDROME (AIDS). INITIATIVE STATUTE.

Results
| Choice | Votes | % |
|---|---|---|
| Yes | 2,039,744 | 28.92% |
| No | 5,012,255 | 71.08% |
County results
No
80–90%
70–80%
60–70%
50–60%

Proposition 64 was a proposition in the state of California on the November 4, 1986, ballot. It was an initiative statute that would have restored Acquired Immune Deficiency Syndrome (AIDS) to the list of communicable diseases. The measure was defeated by a margin of 71% to 29%.

Activists associated with Lyndon LaRouche formed the "Prevent AIDS Now Initiative Committee" (PANIC) to place what became "Proposition 64" on the California state ballot. The initiative was written by Khushro Ghandhi, who was also the president of PANIC. Brian Lantz was vice-president and Ted Andromidas was treasurer.

== The initiative ==
Proponents argued that the measures would merely return AIDS to the list of communicable diseases under the public health laws. The ballot argument in favor of the proposition were pathologist John Grauerholz, psychiatrist Nancy T. Mullan, and former Centers for Disease Control advisor Gus S. Sermos. Congressman William E. Dannemeyer was also a proponent.

Opponents characterized it as an effort to force HIV-positive individuals out of their jobs and into quarantine. Said Helen Miramontes, R.N., president of the California Nurses Association:

Health professionals believe that Proposition 64 would seriously hurt their ability to treat and find a cure for AIDS. Current medical efforts based on years of research will be undermined by the fear generated by this irrational proposition.

The ballot argument against the measure was signed by Gladden V. Elliott, president of the California Medical Association, Congressman Ed Zschau, and Senator Alan Cranston. The submitted supporting argument included claims that AIDS could be transmitted by insects, respiratory means and casual contact. These claims were challenged in a suit by California Secretary of State March Fong Eu, based on the argument that they had no scientific support.

The initiative was opposed by the Catholic Bishops of California.

In 1986, the text of Proposition 64 was re-introduced in California by the "Prevent AIDS Now In California" (also PANIC) committee and appeared on the November 1986 ballot as Proposition 69. It was also defeated.

== Related controversies ==
The gathering of signatures to qualify the initiative was handled in part by a paid contractor. The fee was paid with a contribution by the Caucus Distributors Inc, a key part of the LaRouche movement. The political consultant who was hired by the LaRouche organization to collect signatures for the PANIC initiative was convicted of fraud in October 1988. The consultant, Stanley I. Dale, used out-of-state signature-collectors and claimed they were California residents. March Fong Eu, Secretary of State of California, notified the committee that her office had received numerous complaints of harassment by signature gatherers, including "outrageous verbal abuse for mere failure to sign petitions". She warned them that further complaints would result in legal action.

LaRouche activists accused official agencies such as the Centers for Disease Control of "criminal malfeasance" for refusing to back measures such as mandatory testing.

== See also ==
- List of California ballot propositions: 1980–1989
