= 2008 California Propositions 98 and 99 =

California Propositions 98 and 99 were competing ballot propositions in the U.S. state of California to limit the use of eminent domain and possibly rent control. They were voted on June 3, 2008; proposition 98 failed, while proposition 99 passed.

== The measures ==
The propositions were partly a reaction to the 2005 U.S. Supreme Court ruling in Kelo v. City of New London, which held that the power of eminent domain can sometimes be used to transfer property from one private owner to another. They addressed the issue differently, and also included other measures.

Proposition 98 would have prohibited "state and local governments from condemning or damaging private property for private uses", changed litigation rules to be more friendly to property owners, and required the government to allow the original owner to repurchase the property at the original price if it ended up being put to a different use than originally stated. In addition, the proposition would have prohibited rent control and similar measures.

Proposition 99 more narrowly prohibited "state and local governments from using eminent domain to acquire an owner-occupied residence [if the owner has occupied the residence for at least one year], as defined, for conveyance to a private person or business entity", subject to some exceptions. It did not prohibit rent control nor the use of eminent domain for properties other than residences occupied by the owner for over a year. The nonpartisan California Legislative Analyst's Office (which prepares analyses for the official state voter guide) concluded, "Proposition 99 would not significantly change current government land acquisition practices."

If both propositions had passed, but Proposition 99 received more votes, only it, and not Proposition 98, would become law. However, this ended up not to matter as only Proposition 99 passed.

== Support and opposition ==
Proposition 98 was co-sponsored by the Howard Jarvis Taxpayers Association, and was also supported by landlord groups. It was opposed by tenant groups and associations of cities and redevelopment agencies, who preferred Proposition 99. By April 2008, supporters of Proposition 98 had raised $3.5 million, and opponents $6.4 million, to conduct their campaigns.

== Results ==

Proposition 98
Choice	Votes	%
For	1,675,213	38.49
Against	2,677,456	61.51
Total	4,352,669	100.00
Valid votes	4,352,669	95.66
Invalid/blank votes	197,558	4.34
Total votes	4,550,227	100.00
Registered voters/turnout		28.22

Proposition 99
Choice	Votes	%
For	2,678,106	61.96
Against	1,644,509	38.04
Total	4,322,615	100.00
Valid votes	4,322,615	95.00
Invalid/blank votes	227,612	5.00
Total votes	4,550,227	100.00
Registered voters/turnout		28.22

== See also ==
- California state elections, June 2008
