= June 2008 California elections =

- June 3, 2008

Elections were held in California on June 3, 2008. The elections included two ballot propositions and one recall election for a State Senate seat. All primary elections for Californian seats to the House of Representatives, all of the seats of the State Assembly, and all odd-numbered seats of the State Senate were also held.

== Propositions ==
=== Proposition 98 ===
Proposition 98 would have been a constitutional amendment that limited eminent domain and gradually eliminated rent control.

Proposition 98
Choice	Votes	%
For	1,675,213	38.49
Against	2,677,456	61.51
Total	4,352,669	100.00
Valid votes	4,352,669	95.66
Invalid/blank votes	197,558	4.34
Total votes	4,550,227	100.00
Registered voters/turnout		28.22

=== Proposition 99 ===
Proposition 99 was a constitutional amendment that limited eminent domain and government acquisition of owner-occupied residences.

Proposition 99
Choice	Votes	%
For	2,678,106	61.96
Against	1,644,509	38.04
Total	4,322,615	100.00
Valid votes	4,322,615	95.00
Invalid/blank votes	227,612	5.00
Total votes	4,550,227	100.00
Registered voters/turnout		28.22

== 12th State Senate district recall election ==
In response to his actions involving the state budget, a petition to recall State Senator Jeff Denham, a Republican who represents California's 12th State Senate district, was circulated. In the election his successor was to be determined, if a majority of voters favored the recall. As it happened, the majority did not and he remained in office.

California's 12th State Senate district recall election, 2008
Vote on recall		Votes	Percentage
No		61,309	75.36%
Yes		20,043	24.64%
Valid votes		81,352	95.11%
Invalid or blank votes		4,183	4.89%
Totals		85,535	100.00%
Voter turnout		28.44%	
Party	Candidate	Votes	Percentage
Democratic	Simon Salinas	30,946	100.00%
Valid votes		30,946	36.18%
Invalid or blank votes		54,589	63.82%
Totals		85,535	100.00%
Voter turnout		28.44%	
Republican hold			

== See also ==
- February 2008 California elections
