= 1988 California Proposition 98 =

Referendum on education funding

Proposition 98
- School Funding

Results
Choice	Votes	%
Yes	4,628,737	50.70%
No	4,500,503	49.30%
County results
For
60%–70%
50%–60%
Against
60%–70%
50%–60%

California Proposition 98 is a ballot initiative that requires a minimum percentage of the state budget to be spent on K–12 education and community colleges. Prop 98 guarantees an annual increase in education in the California budget. Prop 98, also called the "Classroom Instructional Improvement and Accountability Act", amended the California Constitution to mandate a minimum level of education spending based on three tests. Test 1 requires spending on education to make up the same programmatic share of the budget as it did in 1986–87. (Note: Due to complicated shifts in accounting and definitions, this has ranged from 35 to 41 percent.) Test 2, generally used in years of strong state budget growth, requires spending on education to equal the previous year’s spending plus per capita growth and student enrollment adjustment. Test 3, used in years of weak state budget growth, guarantees the prior year’s spending plus adjustment for enrollment growth, increases for any changes in per capita general fund revenues, and any changes in state general funds plus 0.5 percent.

This is accomplished by shifting specified amounts of property tax revenues from cities, counties and special districts to "educational revenue augmentation funds" (ERAF) to support schools statewide. Proposition 98 can be suspended only by a two-thirds vote of the California Legislature.

The initiative was motivated by 1978's Proposition 13, which limited assessed property taxes to one percent of a home's value in California and thus limited the amount of local funds that could be spent on school districts.

Proposition 98 has been attacked by some groups because it mandates "auto-pilot spending" and reduces the Legislature's budgetary flexibility.
