= List of 2012 United States ballot measures =

2013 United States ballot measures
- 2012

Part of the 2012 United States elections

This is a list of legal referendums submitted directly to voters in the United States in 2012.

== List by state ==
=== Alabama ===
Origin	Status	Measure	Description (Result of a "yes" vote)	Date	Yes	No
Legislature	Approved	Alabama Medicaid Amendment, Amendment 1	Authorize the transfer of $145.8 million from an oil and gas trust fund to the General Fund for the state Medicaid budget, prisons, courts and other non-education functions of government.	Sep 18	357,036; 64.90%	193,072; 35.10%
Legislature	Approved	Alabama Forever Wild Land Trust Amendment, Amendment 1	Extend payments made to the Forever Wild Land Trust for a 20-year period; changing the proposed payments from fiscal year 2012-2013 to fiscal year 2031-2032.	Nov 6	1,323,819; 75.16%	437,560; 24.84%
Legislature	Approved	Alabama General Obligation Bond Amendment, Amendment 2	Allow the state to issue general obligation bonds of no more than $750 million.	Nov 6	1,145,034; 69.42%	504,610; 30.58%
Legislature	Approved	Alabama Baldwin County Stockton Landmark District Amendment, Amendment 3	Define the Stockton Landmark District within the county and prohibited any annexation of property within the district into a municipality by local law.	Nov 6	887,024; 67.80%	421,255; 32.20%
Legislature	Failed	Alabama Segregation Reference Ban Amendment, Amendment 4	Remove language from the Alabama Constitution that references segregation by race in schools and repeal Section 259, which related to poll taxes.	Nov 6	675,064; 39.33%	1,040,987; 60.67%
Legislature	Approved	Alabama Assets and Liabilities Transfer Amendment, Amendment 5	Transfer the assets and liabilities of the Water Works and Sewer Board of the City of Richard to the Board of Water and Sewer Commissioners of the City of Mobile.	Nov 6	900,596; 68.65%	411,167; 31.35%
Legislature	Approved	Alabama Healthcare Amendment, Amendment 6	Prohibit any person, employer, or health care provider from being compelled to participate in any health care system.	Nov 6	969,069; 58.96%	674,518; 41.04%
Legislature	Approved	Alabama Secret Ballot Amendment, Amendment 7	Guarantee the right to a secret ballot in votes of employee representation and public votes on referendums and public office.	Nov 6	1,056,299; 67.11%	517,595; 32.89%
Legislature	Approved	Alabama Legislative Compensation Amendment, Amendment 8	Provide that the compensation paid to legislators would not increase during term of office, establish that the basic compensation of the Legislature be at the median household income in the state, and require legislators to submit signed vouchers for reimbursement for expenses.	Nov 6	1,102,981; 68.50%	507,123; 31.50%
Legislature	Approved	Alabama Business Privilege Tax Amendment, Amendment 9	Allow the state legislature to implement a business privilege tax on corporations among other provisions.	Nov 6	880,606; 57.80%	642,927; 42.20%
Legislature	Approved	Alabama Banking Amendment, Amendment 10	Repeal measures related to the authority of state legislature and banking in the state.	Nov 6	778,966; 54.04%	662,372; 45.96%
Legislature	Approved	Alabama Lawrence County Amendment, Amendment 11	Prohibit any municipality from outside of Lawrence County from imposing any municipal ordinance or regulation.	Nov 6	830,067; 66.11%	425,501; 33.89%

=== Alaska ===
Origin	Status	Measure	Description (Result of a "yes" vote)	Date	Yes	No
Citizens	Approved	Alaska Ballot Measure 1, Increase Maximum Local Residential Property Tax Exemption Initiative	Allow cities and boroughs to increase the residential property tax exemption from $20,000 to up to $50,000, with voter approval, and to adjust the exemption for increases in the cost of living.	Aug 28	61,804; 50.13%	61,495; 49.87%
Citizens	Failed	Alaska Coastal Management Question, Ballot Measure 2	Establish a new coastal management program in the state called the Alaska Coastal Zone Management Program.	Aug 28	46,678; 37.91%	76,440; 62.09%
Bond Issue	Approved	Alaska Transportation Project Bonds Question, Bonding Proposition A	allowed for a general obligation bond - not exceeding $453,499,200 - to be issued for the purpose of transportation projects in the state.	Nov 6	159,976; 58.13%	115,222; 41.87%
Automatic Ballot Referral	Failed	Alaska Constitutional Convention Question, Ballot Measure 1	Create a convention to revise, alter or amend the state constitution.	Nov 6	90,079; 33.41%	179,567; 66.59%

=== Arizona ===
Origin	Status	Measure	Description (Result of a "yes" vote)	Date	Yes	No
Legislature	Approved	Arizona Proposition 114, Crime Victim Protection Amendment	Prohibit felony crime victims from having to pay damages.	Nov 6	1,664,473; 79.95%	417,431; 20.05%
Legislature	Failed	Arizona Proposition 115, Judicial Terms, Retirement Age, Commission Membership, and Court Decisions Amendment	Increase term lengths and the retirement age for justices and judges, modifies membership of appointment commissions, and requires superior courts to publish decisions online.	Nov 6	553,132; 27.66%	1,446,970; 72.34%
Legislature	Failed	Arizona Proposition 116, Tax Exemptions for Business Equipment Amendment	Establish a tax exemption amount for business equipment to be equal to the combined earnings of 50 workers.	Nov 6	852,981; 43.92%	1,089,294; 56.08%
Legislature	Approved	Arizona Proposition 117, Property Tax Increase Cap Amendment	Set a 5% annual cap on increases in property values used to determine property taxes and establishing a single limited property value as the basis for calculating all property taxes on real property.	Nov 6	1,132,766; 56.67%	866,249; 43.33%
Legislature	Approved	Arizona Proposition 118, State Land Trust Permanent Endowment Fund Amendment	Adjust the distribution formula for the State Land Trust Permanent Endowment Fund to 2.5% of the average monthly market value of the fund.	Nov 6	950,938; 50.52%	931,238; 49.48%
Legislature	Approved	Arizona Proposition 119, State Trust Land Amendment	Authorize the exchange of state trust lands for protecting military facilitates or improving land management.	Nov 6	1,194,594; 61.94%	733,907; 38.06%
Legislature	Failed	Arizona Proposition 120, Declare State's Sovereignty Over Public Lands and Natural Resources Amendment	Declare Arizona's sovereignty over public lands and all natural resources within its boundaries, excluding Indian reservations, federal property, or land ceded by the state.	Nov 6	623,461; 32.27%	1,308,299; 67.73%
Citizens	Failed	Arizona Proposition 121, Top-Two Primary Elections Initiative	Replace the party primary election system with a top-two primary election system in which all candidates regardless of party affiliation run in the same primary and the two candidates who receive the most votes proceed to the general election.	Nov 6	662,366; 33.07%	1,340,286; 66.93%
Citizens	Failed	Arizona Proposition 204, Sales Tax Increase Initiative	Permanently increasing the state sales tax by one cent per dollar.	Nov 6	768,422; 36.22%	1,353,212; 63.78%

=== Arkansas ===
Origin	Status	Measure	Description (Result of a "yes" vote)	Date	Yes	No
Legislature	Approved	Arkansas Sales Tax Increase Amendment, Issue 1	Implement a half-percent sales tax in the state to be used to pay for a four-lane highway system statewide.	Nov 6	592,980; 58.21%	425,733; 41.79%
Legislature	Failed	Arkansas Redevelopment Project Question, Issue 2	Authorize cities and counties to create districts within that county for redevelopment projects.	Nov 6	424,782; 43.38%	554,361; 56.62%
Legislature	Failed	Arkansas Medical Marijuana Question, Issue 5	Allow the use of marijuana for medical purposes free from legal penalty.	Nov 6	507,757; 48.56%	537,898; 51.44%

=== California ===
Origin	Status	Measure	Description (Result of a "yes" vote)	Date	Yes	No
Citizens	Approved	California Proposition 28, Change in State Legislative Term Limits Initiative	Remove the limits of two 4-year terms for state senators and of three 2-year terms for state representatives and instead create a lifetime term limit of twelve years in the state legislature.	Jun 5	3,031,554; 61.04%	1,935,058; 38.96%
Citizens	Failed	California Proposition 29, Tobacco Tax for Cancer Research Fund Initiative	Increase the state tax on cigarettes by $0.05 per cigarette or $1.00 per 20-count pack of cigarettes, thereby increasing the total state tax from $0.87 per pack to $1.87 per pack, and use the additional tax revenue to fund the California Cancer Research Life Sciences Innovation Trust Fund, establish a nine-member committee to oversee the administration of the fund, and require the Board of Equalization to set an annual tax comparable to the additional cigarette tax on other tobacco products.	Jun 5	2,568,715; 49.77%	2,592,791; 50.23%
Citizens	Approved	California Proposition 30, Sales and Income Tax Increase Initiative	Increase the state sales tax from 7.25% to 7.50% for a period of four years, creating four new tax brackets and tax rates for incomes exceeding $250,000, $300,000, $500,000, and $1 million for a period of seven years, and distribute the revenue from the tax increases to K-12 schools and community colleges.	Nov 6	7,014,114; 55.37%	5,653,637; 44.63%
Citizens	Failed	California Proposition 31, Two-Year State Budget Cycle Initiative	Establish a two-year budget cycle, prohibiting the state legislature from expending more than $25 million without creating budgetary offsets or other spending cuts, permitting the governor to enact budget cuts during declared fiscal emergencies, requiring performance reviews of state programs, and allowing local governments to change procedures for locally administered programs that are state-funded.	Nov 6	4,642,088; 39.48%	7,115,166; 60.52%
Citizens	Failed	California Proposition 32, Ban on Political Contributions from Payroll Deductions Initiative	Ban unions and corporations from contributing payroll-deducted funds to state and local candidates, as well as, banning government contractors from contributing to candidates that may award government contracts.	Nov 6	5,400,218; 43.40%	7,043,917; 56.60%
Citizens	Failed	California Proposition 33, History of Automobile Insurance Discount Initiative	Allow insurers to set prices based on whether the driver previously carried insurance coverage with any insurance company over the last five years.	Nov 6	5,510,282; 44.90%	6,737,571; 55.01%
Citizens	Failed	California Proposition 34, Abolition of the Death Penalty Initiative	Abolish the death penalty and replace it with a maximum life sentence without the opportunity for parole, apply the abolition and new sentencing retroactively, and allocate $100 million to law enforcement for rape and homicide investigations.	Nov 6	5,974,243; 48.05%	6,460,264; 51.95%
Citizens	Approved	California Proposition 35, Ban on Human Trafficking and Sex Slavery Initiative	Increase maximum sentencing for human trafficking to 15 years to life and $1.5 million in fines, allocate collected fines to victims of human trafficking and law enforcement, require persons convicted to be registered as a sex offender, and require human trafficking training for law enforcement.	Nov 6	10,078,476; 81.35%	2,310,612; 18.65%
Citizens	Approved	California Proposition 36, Changes to Three Strikes Sentencing Initiative	Change the three strikes sentencing system established by the 1994 ballot initiative Proposition 184, to impose life sentences when new felony convictions are serious or violent, and allow resentencing for convicts serving life sentences for felonies that were not serious or violent, except in the case of rape, murder, or child molestation.	Nov 6	8,575,619; 69.30%	3,798,218; 30.70%
Citizens	Failed	California Proposition 37, Mandatory Labeling of Genetically Engineered Food Initiative	Require labeling for foods that are genetically modified and prohibit labeling such foods as "natural"	Nov 6	6,088,714; 48.59%	6,442,371; 51.41%
Citizens	Failed	California Proposition 38, State Income Tax Increase for Education Funding Initiative	Increase state income taxes by 0.4% for the lowest earners (those making $7,316 to $17,346) to 2.2% for the highest earners (those making over $2.5 million) for 12 years to fund education and early childhood programs.	Nov 6	3,541,199; 28.72%	8,789,892; 71.28%
Citizens	Approved	California Proposition 39, Out-of-State Business Tax Liability Calculations and Energy Funding Initiative	Require out-of-state businesses to calculate income taxes based on percentage of sales in California, repealing state law that allowed out-of-state businesses to choose tax liability formulas, and dedicating half of the resulting revenue ($500-$550 million annually) for five years from the expected increase in revenue under the initiative to fund the Clean Energy Job Creation Fund, which was designed to "support projects intended to improve energy efficiency and expand the use of alternative energy."	Nov 6	7,384,417; 61.10%	4,701,563; 38.90%
Veto Referendum	Approved	California Proposition 40, State Senate Redistricting Plan Referendum	Uphold the state Senate districts drawn by the Citizens Redistricting Commission, which were certified by the commission on August 15, 2011, and that took effect on June 5, 2012.	Nov 6	8,354,158; 71.94%	3,258,740; 28.06%

=== Colorado ===
Origin	Status	Measure	Description (Result of a "yes" vote)	Date	Yes	No
Citizens	Approved	Colorado Amendment 64, Regulation of Marijuana Initiative	Allow the possession and use of marijuana by those over 21 and establishing regulations for marijuana.	Nov 6	1,383,140; 55.32%	1,116,894; 44.68%
Citizens	Approved	Colorado Amendment 65, Federal Campaign Spending and Contribution Amendment Initiative	Amend the state constitution and revise Colorado statutes concerning support by Colorado's legislative representatives for a federal constitutional amendment to limit campaign contributions and spending, and instruct Colorado's congressional delegation to propose and support, and the members of Colorado's state legislature to ratify, an amendment to the United States constitution that allows congress and the states to limit campaign contributions and spending.	Nov 6	1,762,516; 74.01%	619,073; 25.99%
Legislature	Approved	Colorado Amendment S, Changes to the State Personnel System Amendment	Increase the number and positions that are exempt from the state personnel system and making other amendments to the state personnel system.	Nov 6	1,276,432; 56.36%	988,542; 43.64%

=== Florida ===
Origin	Status	Measure	Description (Result of a "yes" vote)	Date	Yes	No
Legislature	Failed	Florida Amendment 1, Health Insurance and Payments Amendment	Prohibit compulsory health insurance and permit the direct payment of health care expenses.	Nov 6	3,632,315; 48.50%	3,856,608; 51.50%
Legislature	Approved	Florida Amendment 2, Injured Veterans' Homestead Property Tax Discount Amendment	Expand the availability of the homestead property tax discount for veterans injured in combat.	Nov 6	4,907,341; 63.25%	2,850,880; 36.75%
Legislature	Failed	Florida Amendment 3, State Revenue Limitation Amendment	Increase the state's revenue limitation and requiring excess funds be deposited into a budget stabilization fund until the fund hits its maximum, at which time the money first be spent on public education and then additional excess funds be returned to the taxpayers.	Nov 6	3,204,350; 42.44%	4,346,740; 57.56%
Legislature	Failed	Florida Amendment 4, Property Assessments and Homestead Tax Exemption Amendment	Amend the calculations for property assessments and allowing for the establishment of an additional homestead tax exemption.	Nov 6	3,244,138; 43.18%	4,268,467; 56.82%
Legislature	Failed	Florida Amendment 5, State Judicial System Amendment	Amend the state constitution relative to the changing of court rules, require senatorial approval of state Supreme Court justice appointments, and change the process for judicial impeachments.	Nov 6	2,728,008; 36.95%	4,654,167; 63.05%
Legislature	Failed	Florida Amendment 6, State Constitution Interpretation and Prohibit Public Funds for Abortions Amendment	Prohibit the state from spending public funds for abortions or health insurance that includes abortion coverage, with certain exceptions, and add language to the Florida Constitution providing that the state constitution cannot be interpreted to "create broader rights to an abortion" than the U.S. Constitution.	Nov 6	3,511,354; 44.90%	4,308,408; 55.10%
Legislature	Failed	Florida Amendment 8, Repeal of Ban on Public Funding for Religious Entities Amendment	Prohibit the state from denying funding to individuals or entities based on religious identity or belief and repealing the existing constitutional ban on using public funds to aid religious or sectarian institutions.	Nov 6	3,441,128; 44.53%	4,286,376; 55.47%
Legislature	Approved	Florida Amendment 9, Surviving Spouse Homestead Property Tax Exemption Amendment	Allow for an ad valorem homestead property tax exemption for surviving spouses of those killed in their work as a first responder or in the military.	Nov 6	4,747,536; 61.68%	2,950,083; 38.32%
Legislature	Failed	Florida Amendment 10, Tangible Personal Property Exemption Amendment	Provide a tangible personal property exemption on ad valorem taxes and allow counties and municipalities to establish tangible personal property tax exemptions.	Nov 6	3,432,905; 45.49%	4,113,395; 54.51%
Legislature	Approved	Florida Amendment 11, Senior Low Income Homestead Tax Exemption Amendment	Allow municipalities and counties to create additional homestead tax exemptions for low-income people above the age of 65 who meet certain requirements.	Nov 6	4,717,827; 61.25%	2,984,270; 38.75%
Legislature	Failed	Florida Amendment 12, Student Member of the Board of Governors of the State University System Amendment	Have the chair of the council of state university student body presidents replace the president of the Florida Student Association as the student member of the Board of Governors of the State University System.	Nov 6	3,060,425; 41.55%	4,306,068; 58.45%

=== Georgia ===
Origin	Status	Measure	Description (Result of a "yes" vote)	Date	Yes	No
Legislature	Approved	Georgia Amendment 1, Provide for State Charter Schools Measure	Authorize the legislature to provide for state charter schools, defined as public schools operating under a charter agreement with the State Board of Education.	Nov 6	2,178,183; 58.58%	1,540,198; 41.42%
Legislature	Approved	Georgia Multi-Year Rental Agreements, Amendment 2	Authorize the State Properties Commission to enter into multiyear lease agreements.	Nov 6	2,266,980; 63.77%	1,287,761; 36.23%

=== Hawaii ===
Origin	Status	Measure	Description (Result of a "yes" vote)	Date	Yes	No
Legislature	Failed	Hawaii Dam and Reservoir Owners Assistance Amendment	Authorize the state to issue special purpose revenue bonds and use the proceeds from the bonds to assist dam and reservoir owners to make their facilities compliant with current safety standards.	Nov 6	212,395; 48.70%	175,952; 40.30% (Note: In order for a ballot measure amending the Hawaii Constitution to become law, the votes in favor of it must equal or surpass a majority of all votes cast in the election. The percentages listed for the Amendment subsequently do not add up to 100 percent due to there having been ballots cast that had left the Amendment questions blank.)
Legislature	Failed	Hawaii Appointment of Retired Judges Amendment	Authorize the Chief Justice of the Supreme Court to appoint retired judges to temporary stations.	Nov 6	216,655; 49.60%	174,190; 39.90%

=== Idaho ===
Origin	Status	Measure	Description (Result of a "yes" vote)	Date	Yes	No
Veto Referendum	Failed	Idaho Proposition 1, Teachers Collective Bargaining Veto Referendum	Uphold contested the legislation limiting teachers' collective bargaining agreements, ending tenure, and ending the practice of issuing renewable contracts being approved.	Nov 6	277,102; 42.74%	371,224; 57.26%
Veto Referendum	Failed	Idaho Proposition 2, Teachers Collective Bargaining Veto Referendum	Uphold the contested legislation, which provided teacher performance pay based on state-mandated test scores, student performance, hard to fill positions and leadership.	Nov 6	272,939; 42.01%	376,689; 57.99%
Veto Referendum	Failed	Idaho Online Learning Veto Referendum, Proposition 3	Uphold the contested legislation, requiring the provision of computing devices and online courses for high school graduation financed through a shift of money away from the salaries of teachers and administrators.	Nov 6	215,800; 33.27%	432,667; 66.73%
Legislature	Approved	Idaho Hunting and Fishing Amendment, HJR 2	Add to the Idaho Constitution the right to hunt, fish and trap in the state.	Nov 6	456,514; 73.42%	165,289; 26.58%
Legislature	Approved	Idaho State Prison Control Amendment, SJR 102	Allow the State Board of Correction control, direction, and management of adult felony probation and parole.	Nov 6	454,175; 74.40%	156,249; 25.60%

=== Illinois ===
Origin	Status	Measure	Description (Result of a "yes" vote)	Date	Yes	No
Legislature	Failed	Illinois Public Pension Amendment, HJRCA 49	Require a three-fifths approval by the General Assembly, city councils, and school districts that wish to increase the pension benefits of their employees.	Nov 6	2,282,862; 55.95%	1,796,983; 44.05% (Note: In order for a ballot measure amending the Illinois Constitution to become law, the measure must be approved by either three-fifths of those voting on the question or by a majority of people voting in the election.)

=== Kansas ===
Origin	Status	Measure	Description (Result of a "yes" vote)	Date	Yes	No
Legislature	Approved	Kansas Boat Property Tax Amendment, HCR 5017	Allow state legislators to classify and tax watercraft on a basis different from other property.	Nov 6	551,479; 53.48%	479,792; 46.52%

=== Kentucky ===
Origin	Status	Measure	Description (Result of a "yes" vote)	Date	Yes	No
Legislature	Approved	Kentucky Hunting and Fishing Amendment, House Bill 1	Amend the Kentucky Constitution to state that the citizens of Kentucky have the personal right to hunt, fish, and harvest wildlife, subject to laws and regulations that promote conservation and preserve the future of hunting and fishing, and to state that public hunting and fishing shall be a preferred means of managing and controlling wildife.	Nov 6	1,298,340; 84.49%	238,320; 15.51%

=== Louisiana ===
Origin	Status	Measure	Description (Result of a "yes" vote)	Date	Yes	No
Legislature	Approved	Louisiana Medicaid Trust Fund, Amendment 1	Prohibit monies in the Medicaid Trust Fund for the Elderly from being used or appropriated for other purposes when adjustments are made to eliminate a state deficit.	Nov 6	1,282,809; 70.84%	527,850; 29.16%
Legislature	Approved	Louisiana Right to Bear Arms, Amendment 2	Amend the state constitution to provide that the right to keep and bear arms and ensure any restriction of that right requires the highest standard of review by a court.	Nov 6	1,331,891; 73.45%	481,360; 26.55%
Legislature	Approved	Louisiana Public Retirement Bill Filing, Amendment 3	Require legislation effecting any change to laws concerning retirement systems for public employees that is to be pre-filed to be filed no later than forty-five days before the start of a regular legislative session and to require the completion of public notice requirements regarding legislation effecting such a change no later than sixty days before introduction of the bill.	Nov 6	1,100,604; 64.47%	606,653; 35.53%
Legislature	Approved	Louisiana Property Tax Exemption for Veterans' Spouses, Amendment 4	Exempt from ad valorem taxation, in addition to the homestead exemption, the next seventy-five thousand dollars of value of property owned and occupied by the spouse of a deceased veteran with a service-connected disability rating of one hundred percent who died prior to the enactment of the exemption.	Nov 6	1,264,847; 73.51%	455,780; 26.49%
Legislature	Approved	Louisiana Retirement Benefits, Amendment 5	Allow the legislature to deny retirement benefits to any public employee or official who commits a felony related to their office.	Nov 6	1,228,122; 70.28%	519,373; 29.72%
Legislature	Failed	Louisiana New Iberia Property Tax Exemption, Amendment 6	Authorize the granting of ad valorem tax exemption contracts by the city of New Iberia for property annexed by the city after January 1, 2013.	Nov 6	694,499; 42.46%	940,991; 57.54%
Legislature	Approved	Louisiana Boards and Commissions Restructuring, Amendment 7	Retain the existing number of members, relative to the membership of constitutional boards and commissions that have members who are selected from congressional districts, and provide for implementation of membership from reapportioned congressional districts by filling vacancies first from under-represented districts and then from the state at large.	Nov 6	1,002,627; 60.99%	641,304; 39.01%
Legislature	Approved	Louisiana Business Property Tax Exemption, Amendment 8	Authorize the granting of ad valorem tax exemption contracts by the Board of Commerce and Industry for businesses located in parishes which have chosen to participate in a program established for the granting of such contracts.	Nov 6	848,616; 51.68%	793,591; 48.32%
Legislature	Approved	Louisiana Special District Creation, Amendment 9	Provide that no law relative to the creation of a special district, the primary purpose of which includes aiding in crime prevention and security by providing for an increased presence of law enforcement personnel in the district or otherwise promoting and encouraging security in the district, shall be enacted unless three separate notices of the proposed law are published at least thirty days prior to introduction of the bill, which notice shall set forth the substance of the proposed law and whether the governing authority of the special district would be authorized to impose and collect a parcel fee within the district, whether the parcel fee will be imposed or may be increased without an election, and the maximum amount of such fee.	Nov 6	923,879; 56.44%	713,176; 43.56%

=== Maine ===
Origin	Status	Measure	Description (Result of a "yes" vote)	Date	Yes	No
Citizens	Approved	Maine Same-Sex Marriage Question, Question 1	Legalize same-sex marriage in the state.	Nov 6	372,887; 51.5%	334,723; 46.2%
Legislature	Failed	Maine Community College Bond Question, Question 2	Allow for an $11 million bond for higher education in order to expand the state's community college system.	Nov 6	334,580; 46.2%	350,590; 48.4%
Legislature	Approved	Maine Water Access and Wildlife Question, Question 3	Allow for a bond for water and sewer projects in the state.	Nov 6	418,555; 57.8%	270,301; 37.3%
Legislature	Approved	Maine Transportation Bond Question, Question 4	Allow for a $51 million transportation bond, most of it to pay for road and bridge repairs in the state.	Nov 6	499,366; 68.9%	191,454; 26.4%
Legislature	Approved	Maine Water and Sewer Bond Question, Question 5	Allow for a bond for water and sewer projects in the state.	Nov 6	432,813; 59.7%	253,561; 35%

=== Maryland ===
Origin	Status	Measure	Description (Result of a "yes" vote)	Date	Yes	No
Legislature	Approved	Maryland Orphans' Court Judge Qualifications Amendment, Prince George's County, Question 1	Require judges of the Orphans' Court for Prince George's County to have been admitted to practice law in Maryland and be in good standing with the Maryland Bar.	Nov 6	2,133,356; 87.79%	296,631; 12.21%
Legislature	Approved	Maryland Orphans' Court Judge Qualifications Amendment, Baltimore County, Question 2	Require judges of the Orphans' Court for Baltimore County to have been admitted to practice law in Maryland and be in good standing with the Maryland Bar.	Nov 6	2,143,521; 88.05%	290,845; 11.95%
Legislature	Approved	Maryland Elected Officials Removal from Office Amendment, Question 3	Provide conditions under which an elected official convicted of a felony or certain misdemeanors would be removed from office.	Nov 6	2,220,425; 87.98%	303,324; 12.02%
Veto Referendum	Approved	Maryland In-State Tuition Referendum, Question 4	Uphold Senate Bill 167 which would allow undocumented immigrants to pay in-state or in-county tuition at Maryland colleges provided students have attended a Maryland high school for three years, and are able to provide proof that they or their parents have filed taxes.	Nov 6	1,521,579; 58.87%	1,063,228; 41.13%
Veto Referendum	Approved	Maryland Redistricting Referendum, Question 5	Uphold the state legislature's redistricting plan for the boundaries of the state's eight U.S. Congressional Districts.	Nov 6	1,549,511; 64.05%	869,568; 35.95%
Veto Referendum	Approved	Maryland Same-Sex Civil Marriage Referendum, Question 6	Uphold the Civil Marriage Protection Act which will allow same-sex couples to obtain a civil marriage license in the state beginning January 1, 2013.	Nov 6	1,373,504; 52.43%	1,246,045; 47.57%
Legislature	Approved	Maryland Gaming Expansion Question, Question 7	Allow one additional casino to be constructed in Prince George's County and would expand the type of games allowed at existing casinos.	Nov 6	1,373,886; 51.92%	1,272,355; 48.08%

=== Massachusetts ===
Origin	Status	Measure	Description (Result of a "yes" vote)	Date	Yes	No
Legislature	Approved	Massachusetts Question 1, "Right to Repair" Initiative	Require automobile manufacturers to provide non-proprietary diagnostic directly to consumers and also the safety information needed to repair their cars.	Nov 6	2,353,603; 87.71%	392,562; 12.29%
Legislature	Failed	Massachusetts Question 2, Physician-Assisted Death Initiative	Allow a physician licensed in Massachusetts to prescribe medication, at the request of a terminally-ill patient meeting certain conditions, to end that person’s life.	Nov 6	1,466,866; 48.87%	1,534,757; 51.13%
Legislature	Approved	Massachusetts Question 3, Medical Marijuana Initiative	Legalize the use of medical marijuana in the state.	Nov 6	1,914,747; 63.33%	1,108,904; 36.67%

=== Michigan ===
Origin	Status	Measure	Description (Result of a "yes" vote)	Date	Yes	No
Veto Referendum	Failed	Michigan Proposal 1, State Authority to Appoint Emergency Managers and Address Local Government Financial Emergencies Referendum	Establish provisions relating to the appointment of an emergency manager upon the finding of a fiscal emergency.	Nov 6	2,130,354; 47.33%	2,370,601; 52.67%
Citizens	Failed	Michigan Proposal 2, Constitutional Right to Collective Bargaining Initiative	Establish a constitutional right for public and private employees to organize and bargain collectively, invalidating laws that limit union participation or conflict with collective bargaining agreements, and defining employer as anyone with one or more employees.	Nov 6	1,949,513; 42.60%	2,626,731; 57.40%
Citizens	Failed	Michigan Proposal 3, Renewable Energy Requirement Initiative	Require, by 2025, that 25% of annual sales of electricity to be from renewable energy sources and establishing provisions to achieve such requirement.	Nov 6	1,721,279; 37.72%	2,842,000; 62.28%
Citizens	Failed	Michigan Proposal 4, Establish Quality Home Care Council and Collective Bargaining for In-Home Care Workers Initiative	Establish the Michigan Quality Home Care Council, allowing in-home care workers to collectively bargain, requiring training and a worker registry, and authorizing the council to set employment terms and minimum compensation standards.	Nov 6	1,985,595; 43.77%	2,550,420; 56.23%
Citizens	Failed	Michigan Proposal 5, Two-Thirds Legislative or Voter Approval Requirement for New or Increased Taxes Initiative	Require a two-thirds vote of the Michigan State House and Senate or voter approval at a statewide November election to enact new taxes, increase tax rates, or expand the tax base.	Nov 6	1,410,944; 31.24%	3,105,649; 68.76%
Citizens	Failed	Michigan Proposal 6, Require Statewide and Local Voter Approval for State Spending on New International Bridges and Tunnels Initiative	Require approval from a majority of voters statewide and in each municipality where a new international bridge or tunnel would be located before the state of Michigan could spend funds or resources on the project.	Nov 6	1,853,127; 40.70%	2,699,558; 59.30%

=== Minnesota ===
Origin	Status	Measure	Description (Result of a "yes" vote)	Date	Yes	No
Legislature	Failed	Minnesota Amendment 1, Definition of Marriage Amendment	Amend the constitution to define marriage as between one man and one woman in the state.	Nov 6	1,399,916; 48.10%	1,510,434; 51.90%
Legislature	Failed	Minnesota Amendment 2, Require Photo Voter Identification Measure	Amend the constitution to require voters to present a valid photo ID when voting in person or government-issued proof of identity when voting by other methods.	Nov 6	1,362,009; 46.95%	1,539,044; 53.05%

=== Missouri ===
Origin	Status	Measure	Description (Result of a "yes" vote)	Date	Yes	No
Legislature	Approved	Missouri Amendment 2, Public Prayer and Public School Students’ Religious Expressions Measure	Provide that people have a "right to pray individually or corporately in a private or public setting;" provide that public school students can express their religious beliefs in written and oral assignments "free from discrimination based on the religious content of their work;" provide that public school students cannot be "compelled to perform or participate in academic assignments or educational presentations that violate his or her religious beliefs;" provide that public school students have a "right to free exercise of religious expression without interference;" and require public schools to display the text of the U.S. Constitution's Bill of Rights, among other provisions.	Aug 7	780,567; 82.76%	162,631; 17.24%
Legislature	Failed	Missouri Judicial Appointment Amendment, Amendment 3	Grant the governor the power to appoint 4 persons to the Appellate Judicial Commission, the body responsible for choosing nominees for the Court of Appeals and the Missouri Supreme Court.	Nov 6	608,458; 24%	1,929,470; 76%
Citizens	Approved	Missouri Municipal Police Amendment, Proposition A	Require all municipal police forces or departments be controlled by the local governing body.	Nov 6	1,617,443; 63.9%	914,143; 36.1%
Legislature	Failed	Missouri Tobacco Tax Initiative, Proposition B	Create the Health and Education Trust Fund by using the revenue generated from a tax of $0.0365 per cigarette and 25% of the manufacturer's invoice price for roll-your-own tobacco and 15% for other tobacco products.	Nov 6	1,321,586; 49.2%	1,362,005; 50.8%
Citizens	Approved	Missouri Proposition E, Prohibit State-Run Health Insurance Exchanges Without Voter or Legislative Approval Measure	Prohibit the governor and state agencies from creating or running state-based health insurance exchanges without approval from voters through a ballot measure or from the state legislature.	Nov 6	1,573,292; 61.71%	976,250; 38.29%

=== Montana ===
Origin	Status	Measure	Description (Result of a "yes" vote)	Date	Yes	No
Legislature	Approved	Montana LR-120, Parental Notification of Abortion Measure	Require notification of a parent or legal guardian of an pregnant minor under 16 years old at least 48 hours before performing an abortion.	Nov 6	334,416; 70.55%	139,598; 29.45%
Legislature	Approved	Montana Proof of Citizenship Question, LR-121	Require proof of citizenship in order for a person to receive certain services provided by the state.	Nov 6	334,416; 70.55%	139,598; 29.45%
Legislature	Approved	Montana Healthcare Measure, LR-122	Prohibit the state or federal government from mandating the purchase of health insurance or imposing penalties for decisions related to purchasing health insurance.	Nov 6	318,612; 67.20%	155,536; 32.80%
Veto Referendum	Approved	Montana Medical Marijuana Veto Referendum, IR-124	Enact a new medical marijuana program, which includes: permitting patients to grow marijuana or designate a provider; limiting each marijuana provider to three patients; prohibiting marijuana providers from accepting anything of value in exchange for services or products; granting local governments authority to regulate marijuana providers; establishing specific standards for demonstrating chronic pain; and reviewing the practices of doctors who certify marijuana use for 25 or more patients in a 12-month period.	Nov 6	268,790; 57.25%	200,730; 42.75%
Legislature	Approved	Montana Corporate Contributions Initiative, I-166	Establish a state policy that corporations are not entitled to constitutional rights because they are not human beings, and charges Montana elected and appointed officials, state and federal, to implement that policy. Additionally, charge Montana’s congressional delegation to propose a joint resolution offering an amendment to the United States Constitution establishing that corporations are not human beings entitled to constitutional rights.	Nov 6	343,549; 74.67%	116,554; 25.33%

=== Nebraska ===
Origin	Status	Measure	Description (Result of a "yes" vote)	Date	Yes	No
Legislature	Approved	Nebraska Amendment 1, Grounds for Impeachment Amendment	Make any misdemeanor while in pursuit of office grounds for impeachment of a civil officer.	Nov 6	606,433; 82.97%	124,467; 17.03%
Legislature	Approved	Nebraska Hunting and Fishing Amendment, Amendment 2	Establish a constitutional right to hunt, to fish, and to harvest wildlife, and to state that public hunting, fishing, and harvesting of wildlife shall be a preferred means of managing and controlling wildlife.	Nov 6	557,534; 76.73%	169,250; 23.27%
Legislature	Failed	Nebraska Amendment 3, Term Limits Amendment	Amend the state constitution to increase the consecutive term limit from two terms to three terms.	Nov 6	263,394; 35.36%	481,574; 64.64%
Legislature	Failed	Nebraska Amendment 4, Legislative Salary Amendment	Increase state legislator's salaries to $22,500.	Nov 6	236,566; 31.55%	513,230; 68.45%

=== Nevada ===
Origin	Status	Measure	Description (Result of a "yes" vote)	Date	Yes	No
Legislature	Approved	Nevada Question 1, Special Session Amendment	Allow the legislature to call special sessions, limiting their topics and duration to 20 days except for impeachment, and require adjournment by midnight Pacific time.	Nov 6	511,282; 53.97%	436,065; 46.03%

=== New Hampshire ===
Origin	Status	Measure	Description (Result of a "yes" vote)	Date	Yes	No
Legislature	Failed	New Hampshire Income Tax Amendment, CACR 13	Amend the constitution to state that no new tax shall be levied, directly or indirectly, upon a person’s income, from whatever source it is derived.	Nov 6	355,054; 57.09%	266,883; 42.91% (Note: In order for a ballot measure amending the New Hampshire Constitution to become law, it must reach a two thirds majority in favor of the measure.)
Legislature	Failed	New Hampshire State Court Amendment, CACR 26	Amend the constitution to give the New Hampshire Legislature a concurrent power to regulate the administrative affairs of the state court by statute, overriding a court ruling determined by the chief justice of the New Hampshire Supreme Court in the event of a conflict.	Nov 6	294,164; 48.84%	308,094; 51.16%
Automatic Ballot Referral	Failed	New Hampshire Constitutional Convention Question	Call a convention to revise, alter, or amend the constitution.	Nov 6	215,679; 35.96%	384,014; 64.04%

=== New Jersey ===
Origin	Status	Measure	Description (Result of a "yes" vote)	Date	Yes	No
Bond Issue	Approved	New Jersey State College Bond Issue, Public Question 1	Allow the state to borrow $750 million for buildings and upgrades at the state's colleges.	Nov 6	1,541,549; 62.7%	916,259; 37.3%
Legislature	Approved	New Jersey Judicial Salary and Benefits Amendment, Public Question 2	Amend the New Jersey Constitution to mandate that more contributions from judges' and justices' salaries be given for judicial pensions and health care in the state.	Nov 6	1,982,406; 83.1%	401,606; 16.9%

=== New Mexico ===
Origin	Status	Measure	Description (Result of a "yes" vote)	Date	Yes	No
Legislature	Approved	New Mexico Judicial Standards Amendment, Constitutional Amendment 1	Mandate the addition of two members to the Judicial Standards Commission, which investigates allegations against judges, conducts hearings, and also recommends sanctions to the New Mexico Supreme Court.	Nov 6	398,723; 60.22%	263,418; 39.78%
Legislature	Approved	New Mexico Public Regulation Commissioner Qualifications Amendment, Constitutional Amendment 2	Raise the qualifications required to be public regulation commissioner.	Nov 6	537,195; 80.91%	126,776; 19.09%
Legislature	Approved	New Mexico Public Regulation Commission Corporation Chartering Amendment, Constitutional Amendment 3	Remove the job of chartering corporations from the Public Regulations Commission and proved it to the New Mexico Secretary of State.	Nov 6	322,861; 50.75%	313,283; 49.25%
Legislature	Approved	New Mexico Public Regulation Commission Insurance Division Amendment, Constitutional Amendment 4	Remove the insurance division from the Public Regulations Commission, and made it an independent entity.	Nov 6	327,097; 50.71%	317,890; 49.29%
Legislature	Approved	New Mexico Public Defender Office Amendment, Constitutional Amendment 5	Make the office of state public defender separate from the state government, meaning the New Mexico Governor would no longer appoint a person to the position.	Nov 6	399,428; 61.99%	244,953; 38.01%
Bond Issue	Approved	New Mexico Senior Citizen Facility Improvement Bonds, Bond Question A	Authorize bonds - not exceeding $10,335,000 - to make capital expenditures for certain senior citizen facility improvements.	Nov 6	416,513; 62.45%	250,481; 37.55%
Bond Issue	Approved	New Mexico Library Acquisition and Construction Bonds, Bond Question B	Authorize bonds - not exceeding $9,830,000 - to make capital expenditures for public library resource acquisitions.	Nov 6	415,068; 62.03%	254,099; 37.97%
Bond Issue	Approved	New Mexico Higher Education and Special Schools Bonds, Bond Question C	Authorize bonds - not exceeding $120,000,000 - to make capital expenditures for certain higher education improvements.	Nov 6	411,017; 61.12%	261,406; 38.88%

=== North Carolina ===
Origin	Status	Measure	Description (Result of a "yes" vote)	Date	Yes	No
Legislature	Approved	North Carolina Amendment 1, Definition of Marriage and Prohibition of Civil Unions Amendment	Amend the constitution to define marriage as between a man and a woman, and prohibit all other domestic unions, including civil unions, in the state.	May 8	1,317,178; 61.04%	840,802; 38.96%

=== North Dakota ===
Origin	Status	Measure	Description (Result of a "yes" vote)	Date	Yes	No
Legislature	Approved	North Dakota State Office Appointment Amendment, Measure 1	Allow state legislators to be appointed to other government offices and stipulate that the appointment of a member of the Legislative Assembly to a state office for which the compensation was increased more than an increase provided to full-time state employees during the member's term of office is prohibited.	Jun 12	96,951; 60.48%	63,350; 39.52%
Citizens	Failed	North Dakota Property Tax Amendment, Measure 2	Eliminate property taxes throughout the state, starting in 2012.	Jun 12	40,438; 23.46%	131,903; 76.54%
Citizens	Failed	North Dakota Religious Freedom Amendment, Measure 3	Add a new section to Article I of the North Dakota Constitution stating, "Government may not burden a person’s or religious organization’s religious liberty. The right to act or refuse to act in a manner motivated by a sincerely held religious belief may not be burdened unless the government proves it has a compelling governmental interest in infringing the specific act or refusal to act and has used the least restrictive means to further that interest. A burden includes indirect burdens such as withholding benefits, assessing penalties, or an exclusion from programs or access to facilities."	Jun 12	60,611; 35.98%	107,831; 64.02%
Veto Referendum	Approved	North Dakota University "Fighting Sioux" Referendum, Measure 4	Allow the University of North Dakota to discontinue use of the "Fighting Sioux" nickname and logo by approving Senate Bill 2370, a law that repealed an earlier mandate requiring the use of the nickname.	Jun 12	113,865; 67.34%	55,225; 32.66%
Legislature	Approved	North Dakota Poll Tax Amendment, Measure 1	Revoke the authority for the poll tax and removes language referring to 'paupers, idiots' from the state constitution.	Nov 6	206,150; 71.41%	82,518; 28.59%
Legislature	Approved	North Dakota Oaths of Office Amendment, Measure 2	Require the governor and other executive officials to take an oath of office.	Nov 6	259,497; 88.74%	32,926; 11.26%
Citizens	Approved	North Dakota Farming and Ranching Amendment, Measure 3	Amend the state constitution to block any law "which abridges the right of farmers and ranchers to employ agricultural technology, modern livestock production and ranching practices."	Nov 6	201,920; 66.89%	99,934; 33.11%
Citizens	Approved	North Dakota Smoking Ban Initiative, Measure 4	Ban smoking in all indoor workplaces.	Nov 6	209,456; 66.67%	104,730; 33.33%
Citizens	Failed	North Dakota Prevention of Animal Cruelty Initiative, Measure 5	Make it a class C felony for an individual to maliciously harm a living dog, cat or horse, and create some exemptions from the law, including agricultural workers, veterinarians, scientific researchers, and hunters.	Nov 6	109,395; 34.63%	206,546; 65.37%

=== Ohio ===
Origin	Status	Measure	Description (Result of a "yes" vote)	Date	Yes	No
Automatic Ballot Referral	Failed	Ohio Issue 1, Constitutional Convention Question	Create a convention to revise, alter or amend the state constitution.	Nov 6	1,523,239; 31.92%	3,248,142; 68.08%
Citizens	Failed	Ohio Issue 2, Redistricting Commission Initiative	establish a 12-member non-politician commission responsible for adopting state legislative and congressional redistricting plans.	Nov 6	1,800,107; 36.82%	3,088,414; 63.18%

=== Oklahoma ===
Origin	Status	Measure	Description (Result of a "yes" vote)	Date	Yes	No
Legislature	Approved	Oklahoma Property Tax Amendment, State Question 758	Prevent annual increases in property taxes in the state.	Nov 6	858,081; 67.7%	409,041; 32.3%
Legislature	Approved	Oklahoma State Question 759, Affirmative Action Amendment	Ban affirmative action programs in the state and prohibit special treatment based on race or sex in public employment, education and contracts.	Nov 6	745,854; 59.2%	514,163; 40.8%
Legislature	Approved	Oklahoma Governor in the Parole Process Amendment, State Question 762	Decrease the power that the Oklahoma Governor has in the parole process in the state for nonviolent crimes.	Nov 6	745,133; 59.2%	514,080; 40.8%
Legislature	Approved	Oklahoma Reserve Fund Amendment, State Question 764	Allow the Oklahoma Water Resources Board to issue bonds to provide a reserve fund for that board.	Nov 6	706,322; 56.7%	539,492; 43.3%
Legislature	Approved	Oklahoma Public Welfare Department Amendment, State Question 765	Abolish the Oklahoma Department of Human Services, the Oklahoma Commission of Human Services and the position of Director of the Oklahoma Department of Human Services, with the responsibility for rules and regulations regarding the state's elderly falling to the Oklahoma Legislature.	Nov 6	751,909; 59.9%	502,949; 40.1%
Legislature	Approved	Oklahoma Intangible Tax Ban Amendment, State Question 766	Abolish property taxes on intangible personal property.	Nov 6	826,102; 65%	445,500; 35%

=== Oregon ===
Origin	Status	Measure	Description (Result of a "yes" vote)	Date	Yes	No
Legislature	Approved	Oregon Measure 77, Catastrophic Disaster Amendment	Grant the Governor constitutional authority to declare and respond to natural or human‐caused "catastrophic disaster". Authorize the Governor to redirect previously allocated General Fund and lottery monies to disaster response. Require legislative sessions (under emergency conditions, if necessary) to enact implementing legislation, which may include temporarily suspending specified constitutional spending restrictions. Terminate a Governor’s disaster spending authority upon enactment of a law specifying purposes for which funds may be used. Limit disaster authority of Governor and legislature to 30 days unless legislature acts to shorten/lengthen period, with such legislation allowed to include any provision legislature deems necessary to provide "orderly transition" to normal conditions.	Nov 6	957,646; 58.71%	673,468; 41.29%
Legislature	Approved	Oregon Measure 78, Government Branches Amendment	Amend wording in the Oregon Constitution. Revising description of the state Legislative, Executive, and Judicial from "departments" to "branches", revising the description of the two houses of the Legislature to two "chambers" of the Legislature (rather than two "branches" of the Legislature), which also reflects more modern designations for them. Additionally, modernize spelling and make grammatical changes to replace existing references to the Secretary of State as "he," "him," and "his" with gender‐neutral wording.	Nov 6	1,165,963; 71.89%	458,509; 28.11%
Citizens	Approved	Oregon Measure 79, Real Estate Transfer Tax Amendment	Prohibit state and local governments from imposing taxes, fees, assessments on transfer of any interest in real property, except those operative December 31, 2009.	Nov 6	976,587; 58.89%	679,710; 41.11%
Citizens	Failed	Oregon Measure 80, Marijuana Legalization Initiative	Create a commission to license marijuana cultivation by qualified persons and to purchase entire crop with the authority to sell marijuana at cost to pharmacies, medical research facilities and to qualified adults for profit through state-licensed stores, with ninety percent of net proceeds going to the state general fund, with the remainder going to drug education, treatment, and hemp promotion. Provide the commission the ability to regulate use, sets prices, and other duties, and permit the Attorney General to defend against federal challenges andprosecutions. Bans sales to and possession of marijuana by minors and ban public consumption except where signs permit consumption. Effective January 1, 2013; other provisions.	Nov 6	923,071; 53.42%	810,538; 46.58%
Citizens	Failed	Oregon Measure 81, Prohibit Commercial Gillnet Fishing in Columbia River Initiative	Prohibit non-tribal Oregon commercial fishers from using gillnets to catch salmon in the mainstem of the lower Columbia River.	Nov 6	567,996; 34.62%	1,072,614; 65.38%
Citizens	Failed	Oregon Measure 82, Privately-Owned Casinos Amendment	Authorize privately-owned casinos, and require such casinos to give percentage of monthly revenue to the State Lottery for specified purposes.	Nov 6	485,240; 28.29%	1,226,331; 71.71%
Citizens	Failed	Oregon Measure 83, Multnomah County Casino Initiative	Authorize a single privately-owned casino in Multnomah County, and require the casino to give a percentage of monthly revenue to State Lottery for specified purposes.	Nov 6	500,123; 29.23%	1,207,508; 70.77%
Citizens	Failed	Oregon Measure 84, Phase Out Estate and Inheritance Taxes Initiative	Phase out estate and inheritance taxes, tax on death-related property transfers, and taxes on property transfers between family members.	Nov 6	776,143; 45.86%	912,541; 54.14%
Citizens	Approved	Oregon Measure 85, Corporate Tax Refund Redirected to Education Initiative	Allocate the corporate income and excise tax "kicker" refund to the General Fund to provide additional funding for K through 12 public education.	Nov 6	1,007,122; 59.90%	672,586; 40.10%

=== Rhode Island ===
Origin	Status	Measure	Description (Result of a "yes" vote)	Date	Yes	No
Legislature	Approved	Rhode Island Casino Gambling Measure, Question 1	Authorize a state-operated casino at the Twin River venue.	Nov 6	289,530; 70.8%	119,142; 29.2%
Legislature	Approved	Rhode Island Newport Grand Casino Measure, Question 2	Authorize casino games at Newport Grand.	Nov 6	267,819; 66.5%	134,694; 33.5%
Bond Issue	Approved	Rhode Island Higher Education Bonds Question, Question 3	Authorize the state government to issue general bonds of no more than $50,000,000 for renovations and modernization of academic buildings at Rhode Island College.	Nov 6	262,307; 66.2%	133,981; 33.8%
Bond Issue	Approved	Rhode Island Newport Veterans' Home Bond Question, Question 4	Authorize the state government to issue bonds of no more than $94,000,000 for the construction of a new Veterans’ Home and renovations to existing facilities.	Nov 6	304,287; 77.3%	89,130; 22.7%
Bond Issue	Approved	Rhode Island Clean Water Finance Bond Question, Question 5	Authorize the state government to issue bonds of no more than $12,000,000 to finance wastewater infrastructure projects and eight million dollars $8,000,000 to finance drinking water infrastructure projects.	Nov 6	289,330; 73.9%	102,097; 26.1%
Bond Issue	Approved	Rhode Island Newport Environmental Management Bonds Question, Question 6	Authorize the state government to issue bonds of no more than $20,000,000 for environmental and recreational purposes.	Nov 6	276,924; 69.8%	119,659; 30.2%
Bond Issue	Approved	Rhode Island Affordable House Bonds Question, Question 7	Authorize the state government to issue bonds of no more than $25,000,000 for affordable housing.	Nov 6	246,132; 61.6%	153,413; 38.4%

=== South Carolina ===
Origin	Status	Measure	Description (Result of a "yes" vote)	Date	Yes	No
Legislature	Approved	South Carolina Gubernatorial Elections, Amendment 1	Provide that a candidate for the office of governor shall select a lieutenant governor candidate to run on his or her ticket and be elected jointly, and provide that, should the lieutenant governor resign or be removed from office, then the governor would appoint a new lieutenant governor with consent of the senate.	Nov 6	1,009,367; 55.51%	809,063; 44.49%

=== Utah ===
- 2012 Utah Amendment B, a legislatively-referred constitutional amendment that would exempt those serving in the military from having to pay property taxes. This amendment passed.

=== Washington ===
- 2016 Washington Initiative 732

=== Wyoming ===
- 2012 Wyoming Constitutional Amendment A

== Notable local ballot measures ==
- 2012 Los Angeles Measure B
- Measure J (Los Angeles, California)
