= November 2012 California elections =

- November 6, 2012
- Registered: 18,245,970
- Turnout: 72.36% (▲12.77 pp)

Elections were held in California on November 6, 2012. On the ballot were eleven propositions, various parties' nominees for the United States presidency, the Class I Senator to the United States Senate, all of California's seats to the House of Representatives, all of the seats of the State Assembly, and all odd-numbered seats of the State Senate.

This was the first general election with California's newly implemented nonpartisan blanket primary in effect, pursuant to Proposition 14, which passed with 53% voter approval in June 2010. Additionally, in November 2010, voters approved Proposition 20, which authorized a California Citizens Redistricting Commission to re-draw congressional district lines, in addition to its current job of drawing state senate district lines and state assembly district lines, taking away that job from the California state legislature. This was the first general election whose winners represent districts drawn by the Citizens Redistricting Commission.

After the election, California's congressional delegation gained four new Democrats, including the first gay Asian American elected to Congress. Dianne Feinstein won her re-election bid for the U.S. Senate, and the Democrats gained a 2/3 supermajority in both of the state's legislative chambers. California voters also voted to re-elect incumbent president Barack Obama, giving him the state's fifty-five electoral votes. Among the propositions on the ballot, voters chose to increases taxes in order to fund education and other state programs, voted to keep the death penalty and the power of labor unions to use payroll deduction to fund political campaigns, and opted to reform the state's three-strikes law.

== Propositions ==
11 propositions have been qualified for the ballot.

November 2012 California ballot propositions
Name	Description	Votes				Type
Name	Description	Yes	%	No	%	Type
Proposition 30	Increases income tax on incomes over $250,000 for seven years and raises the statewide sales tax by 0.25% for four years.	7,014,114	55.37	5,653,636	44.63	Citizen-initiated constitutional amendment
Proposition 31	Makes several changes to the state budget process.	4,642,088	39.48	7,115,164	60.52	Combined initiated constitutional amendment and state statute
Proposition 32	Bans unions and corporations from contributing payroll-deducted funds to state and local candidates; bans government contractors from contributing to candidates that may award government contracts.	5,400,218	43.40	7,043,915	56.60	Citizen-initiated state statute
Proposition 33	Allows insurers to set prices based on whether the driver previously carried insurance coverage with any insurance company over the last five years.	5,510,281	44.99	6,737,570	55.01	Citizen-initiated state statute
Proposition 34	Repeals Proposition 17 (1972), thus abolishing the death penalty in California.	5,974,243	48.05	6,460,262	51.95	Citizen-initiated state statute
Proposition 35	Expands the definition of human trafficking and increases the penalties for participating in the activity.	10,078,476	81.35 (Note: Later overturned by court.)	2,310,610	18.65	Citizen-initiated state statute
Proposition 36	Punishes habitual offenders by establishing sentence escalation for crimes that were classified as "strikes" and requires a mandatory minimum sentence of 25 to life for a "third-strike offense".	8,575,619	69.30	3,798,216	30.70	Citizen-initiated state statute
Proposition 37	Requires labeling for foods that are genetically modified and prohibits labeling such foods as "natural".	6,088,713	48.59	6,442,370	51.41	Citizen-initiated state statute
Proposition 38	Raises income taxes on all incomes over $7,316 for a period of twelve years, directing the revenues to education and state debt payments for the first four years, and then to education for the last eight years.	3,541,199	28.72	8,789,890	71.28	Citizen-initiated state statute
Proposition 39	Changes the way California businesses determine their state tax liabilities, and earmarks up to $550 million of the anticipated additional revenue to alternative energy projects.	7,384,416	61.10	4,701,562	38.90	Citizen-initiated state statute
Proposition 40	Upholds or rejects the state senate districts drawn by the Citizens Redistricting Commission, which were certified by the commission on August 15, 2011, and that took effect on June 5, 2012.	8,354,156	71.94	3,258,740	28.06	Veto Referendum
Source: California Secretary of State

Results by county

Amendment 30 results by county
Yes:
- 50–60%
- 60–70%
- 70–80%
No:
- 50–60%
- 60–70%

Amendment 31 results by county
No:
- 50–60%
- 60–70%

Amendment 32 results by county
Yes:
- 50–60%
No:
- 50–60%
- 60–70%
- 70–80%

Amendment 33 results by county
Yes:
- 50–60%
No:
- 50–60%
- 60–70%
- 70–80%

Amendment 34 results by county
Yes:
- 50–60%
- 60–70%
- 70–80%
No:
- 50–60%
- 60–70%
- 70–80%

Amendment 35 results by county
Yes:
- 70–80%
- 80–90%

Amendment 36 results by county
Yes:
- 50–60%
- 60–70%
- 70–80%
- 80–90%

Amendment 37 results by county
Yes:
- 50–60%
- 60–70%
No:
- 50–60%
- 60–70%
- 70–80%

Amendment 38 results by county
No:
- 60–70%
- 70–80%
- 80–90%

Amendment 39 results by county
Yes:
- 50–60%
- 60–70%
- 70–80%
No:
- 50–60%
- 60–70%

Amendment 40 results by county
Yes:
- 60–70%
- 70–80%
- 80–90%

=== Postponed ===
==== Proposition 18 (Water bond) ====
This is a legislatively referred statute that would authorize an $11.1 billion bond to upgrade California's water system. On August 9, 2010, the California Legislature postponed the vote on the proposition until 2012. This measure was again delayed to the November 2014 general election.
