= Bradley Whitford =

American actor (born 1959)

- Whitford in 2026
- Born: October 10, 1959 (age 67); Madison, Wisconsin, U.S.
- Other name: Brad Whitford
- Education: Wesleyan University (BA); Juilliard School (GrDip)
- Occupations: Actor; producer
- Years active: 1985–present
- Spouses: Jane Kaczmarek (m. 1992; div. 2010) Amy Landecker (m. 2019)
- Children: 3

Bradley Whitford (born October 10, 1959) is an American actor and producer. From 1999 to 2006, Whitford starred as Josh Lyman, White House Deputy Chief of Staff, in NBC's political drama television series The West Wing. He won a Primetime Emmy Award for Outstanding Supporting Actor in a Drama Series for the role in 2001.

In addition to The West Wing, Whitford played Danny Tripp in Studio 60 on the Sunset Strip, Dan Stark in the Fox police buddy-comedy The Good Guys, Timothy Carter, a character who was believed to be Red John, in the CBS series The Mentalist, antagonist Eric Gordon in the film Billy Madison, Arthur Parsons in The Post, Dean Armitage in the horror film Get Out, Roger Peralta in Brooklyn Nine-Nine, President Gray in the dystopian science fiction film The Darkest Minds and Rick Stanton in the monster film Godzilla: King of the Monsters.

In 2015, he won a second Primetime Emmy Award for his guest role as Marcy in Transparent and later garnered a fifth Primetime Emmy Award nomination for portraying Magnus Hirschfeld in the same series. From 2018 to 2025, Whitford portrayed Commander Joseph Lawrence in Hulu dystopian drama The Handmaid's Tale, for which he won his third Primetime Emmy Award in 2019.

== Early life and education ==
Bradley Whitford was born in Madison, Wisconsin, to Genevieve Louie (née Smith) and George Van Norman Whitford. Between the ages of three and 14, he lived in Wayne, Pennsylvania. He grew up in a Quaker household. In an appearance on Live with Kelly and Mark on October 13, 2025, he said, "I am from a strange family. My parents... they lived very long lives... It would have been their 89th (wedding) anniversary... I have a sister, same parents, 85 years old, 19 or 20 years older than me. They [his parents] had three [children. Ten years later they had] my brother Dave... I grew up watching my older siblings raise families." His mother, a poet, later lived in Chestnut Hill, Philadelphia.

Whitford graduated from Madison East High School in Madison in 1977. He majored in English and theater at Wesleyan University in Middletown, Connecticut, and was a roommate of producer Paul Schiff, the brother of his future West Wing cast mate Richard Schiff. Whitford graduated with a Bachelor of Arts degree in 1981. He then studied drama at the Juilliard School in Manhattan, New York where he was a member of "Group 14". Wendell Pierce, an actor is also from Group 14.

The NBC series Who Do You Think You Are? explored Whitford's ancestry in an August 2022 episode, including ancestors who fought in a crucial American Civil War battle, the Battle of Vicksburg.

== Career ==
Whitford first appeared on television in a 1985 episode of The Equalizer, followed by a two-year recurring role on the ABC daytime drama All My Children. His film debut was in the 1986 film Dead as a Doorman. He made his Broadway theatre debut in 1990 playing Lt. Jack Ross (followed a few months later in the lead role of Lt. Daniel Kaffee), in the Aaron Sorkin written play A Few Good Men. This was the beginning of a recurring working relationship between Whitford and Sorkin.

Whitford's film roles during the 1980s and 1990s included Elisabeth Shue's boyfriend Mike Todwell in Adventures in Babysitting (1987), Roger Latimer in Revenge of the Nerds II: Nerds in Paradise (1987), Jamie Kemp in Presumed Innocent (1990), Charles Phalen in Young Guns II (1990), Dr. Tyler in Awakenings (1990), Al Pacino's nephew Randy Slade in Scent of a Woman (1992), FBI sharpshooter Bobby Lee in A Perfect World (1993), lawyer Jamey Collins in Philadelphia (1993), Assistant U.S. Attorney Thomas Fink in The Client (1994), antagonist Eric Gordon in Billy Madison (1995), and Lloyd Charney in Bicentennial Man (1999). His television appearances during this time included Guiding Light, NYPD Blue, Ellen, The X-Files, Touched by an Angel, and a guest appearance on ER in the Emmy Award-winning episode "Love's Labor Lost".

Whitford joined the cast of Sorkin's The West Wing as Josh Lyman with the show's premiere in 1999. For his role, he won an Emmy Award in 2001 for Best Supporting Actor in a Drama Series. Whitford also wrote two episodes of the series ("Faith Based Initiative" in the sixth season and "Internal Displacement" in the seventh). After The West Wing ended in May 2006, Whitford appeared in Sorkin's later series Studio 60 on the Sunset Strip playing the role of Danny Tripp. He appeared in the British drama Burn Up on the BBC in July 2008.

He starred in the play Boeing-Boeing which opened on Broadway on May 4, 2008. He co-starred in the Joss Whedon/Drew Goddard horror film The Cabin in the Woods, filmed in 2009 but not released until April 2012. In 2010, Whitford starred as Dan Stark in the Fox TV comedy The Good Guys opposite Colin Hanks. In 2011, Whitford guest-starred in In Plain Sight on USA Network as a man combating paranoia. He appeared in the season three finale of The Mentalist as a minion of and decoy for "Red John", the long-sought nemesis of the show's protagonist Patrick Jane. Whitford appeared on Law & Order: Los Angeles as a lawyer. On September 15, 2011, he starred in the one-night-only staged reading of 8, a play written by Dustin Lance Black chronicling the events of a trial surrounding California's Proposition 8.

In 2013, Whitford played Pete Harrison in the ABC comedy Trophy Wife, which was canceled after one season. Also in the same year, he played Don DaGradi in Saving Mr. Banks. In 2014, he appeared in a recurring role as a cross-dressing businessman during the first season of the Amazon Studios series Transparent. He won a Primetime Emmy Award for Outstanding Guest Actor in a Comedy Series for his performance. He returned during the series' second season as Magnus Hirschfeld. In February 2014, it was announced that he was cast in Midnight Rider, a biopic of Gregg Allman directed by Randall Miller. Starting in 2015, Whitford had a recurring role in Brooklyn Nine-Nine as Roger Peralta, father of a lead character Jake Peralta (Andy Samberg). In 2017, Whitford played Dean Armitage, a father and neurosurgeon, in the horror film Get Out and antagonist Arthur Parsons in the political thriller The Post.

In 2018, Whitford played President Gray in the dystopian science fiction film The Darkest Minds. He joined the cast of the web dystopian tragedy The Handmaid's Tale as Commander Joseph Lawrence, guest starring in the final two episodes of the second season. He won the Primetime Emmy Award for Outstanding Guest Actor in a Drama Series in 2019 for his performance becoming the first person to have won the guest acting Emmy Awards for both comedy and drama. He returned as a series regular for the third season and received a nomination for the Primetime Emmy Award for Outstanding Supporting Actor in a Drama Series. In 2019, Whitford played Rick Stanton in the monster film Godzilla: King of the Monsters, and from 2019 to 2020, he starred in the musical comedy series Perfect Harmony, which ran for one season on NBC.

In August 2023, he portrayed Francis in the Los Angeles production of Peter Pan Goes Wrong.

On September 30, 2026, Whitford received a star on the Hollywood Walk of Fame in the television category.

== Personal life ==
Whitford married actress Jane Kaczmarek in August 1992 and they have three children together. Inspired by their own frequent red carpet appearances, in 2002 the couple founded the charity "Clothes off our Back", which auctioned outfits and accessories worn by celebrities at award ceremonies. They were sometimes referred to as a celebrity "power couple".

In May 2007, Whitford was honored by Alliance for Justice, a nonprofit organization, as the 2007 Champion of Justice. He delivered the commencement address at the University of Wisconsin–Madison in 2004. He was the keynote speaker for Class Day at Princeton University in June 2007. As of 2012, Whitford serves on the board of trustees of his alma mater, Wesleyan University.

In June 2009, Whitford and Kaczmarek announced that they were divorcing after almost 17 years of marriage. The divorce was finalized in October 2010. Whitford and his Transparent co-star Amy Landecker began dating in 2015 and they announced their engagement in March 2018. Whitford and Landecker eloped on July 17, 2019.

== Political views and activism ==
Whitford has been said to have "liberal views". He contributed to The Huffington Post as a columnist. He serves on the Board of Advisors of Let America Vote, an organization founded by former Missouri Secretary of State Jason Kander that aims to end voter suppression. He serves on the advisory board of Citizens' Climate Lobby, an international grassroots environmental group founded by Marshall L. Saunders which trains and supports volunteers to build relationships with their elected representatives in efforts to influence climate policy.

In 2011, Whitford spoke at a protest in his native Madison, Wisconsin, in opposition to Governor Scott Walker's budget repair bill. Prior to the 2012 United States elections, Whitford and Courage Campaign founder, Rick Jacobs, appeared together in a video about California's Proposition 30 and Proposition 32; the video encouraged viewers to vote "yes" on the former and "no" on the latter. Leading up to the 2014 Wisconsin gubernatorial election, Whitford visited multiple University of Wisconsin System campuses in support of nominee Mary Burke, who went on to lose against the incumbent, Governor Walker. Whitford supported Hillary Clinton in the 2016 United States presidential election. He has been a vocal critic of Donald Trump.

In 2019, he co-hosted a fundraiser for Democratic presidential candidate Pete Buttigieg alongside actress Gwyneth Paltrow as well as donated to Buttigieg's 2020 presidential campaign. Also in 2019, Whitford appeared in a public service announcement in support of abortion rights alongside other cast members of The Handmaid's Tale. In 2020, he appeared as part of a series of "surprise virtual appearances" in support of Joe Biden's 2020 presidential campaign. He supported Joe Biden and Kamala Harris in the 2024 United States presidential election. In September 2025 he was one of over 400 artists who signed an open letter from the American Civil Liberties Union in support of Jimmy Kimmel following ABC's suspension of Jimmy Kimmel Live!. In October 2025, he criticized the destruction of the East Wing of the White House in an appearance on CNN.

== Filmography ==
=== Film ===
Year	Title	Role	Notes
1986	Dead as a Doorman	Terry Reilly	
1987	Adventures in Babysitting	Mike Todwell	
1987	Revenge of the Nerds II: Nerds in Paradise	Roger Latimer	
1990	Vital Signs	Dr. Donald Ballentine	
1990	Presumed Innocent	Jamie Kemp	
1990	Young Guns II	Charles Phalen	Credited as Brad Whitford
1990	Awakenings	Dr. Tyler	
1992	Scent of a Woman	Randy Slade	
1993	RoboCop 3	Jeffrey Fleck	
1993	My Life	Paul Ivanovich	
1993	A Perfect World	FBI Agent Bobby Lee	
1993	Philadelphia	Jamey Collins	
1994	The Client	Assistant District Attorney Thomas Fink	
1994	Cobb	Process Server	
1995	Billy Madison	Eric Gordon	
1995	The Desperate Trail	Tommy Donnelly	
1996	My Fellow Americans	Chief of Staff Carl Witnaur	
1996	Wildly Available	Professor	
1997	Masterminds	Miles Lawrence	Credited as Brad Whitford
1997	Red Corner	Bob Ghery	
1997	The People	Michael Leary	
1999	The Muse	Hal	
1999	Bicentennial Man	Lloyd Charney	
2001	Kate & Leopold	J.J. Camden	
2005	The Sisterhood of the Traveling Pants	Al Lowell	
2005	Little Manhattan	Adam Burton	
2007	An American Crime	Prosecutor Leroy K. New	
2008	Bottle Shock	Professor Saunders	
2011	The Cabin in the Woods	Steve Hadley	
2013	Savannah	Jack Cay	
2013	Decoding Annie Parker	Marshall Parker	
2013	CBGB	Nicky Gant	
2013	Saving Mr. Banks	Don DaGradi	
2013	Agent Carter	Agent John Flynn	Short film
2015	I Saw the Light	Fred Rose	
2016	Other People	Norman Mulcahey	
2017	Get Out	Dean Armitage	
2017	A Happening of Monumental Proportions	Arthur Schneedy	
2017	Megan Leavey	Bob Leavey	
2017	Unicorn Store	Gene	
2017	Three Christs	Clyde	
2017	The Post	Arthur Parsons	
2018	The Darkest Minds	President Gray	
2018	Destroyer	Dennis DiFranco	
2019	Phil	Michael Fisk	
2019	Godzilla: King of the Monsters	Dr. Rick Stanton	
2019	The Last Full Measure	Carlton Stanton	
2020	Sergio	Paul Bremer	
2020	The Call of the Wild	Judge Miller	
2020	Songbird	William Griffin	
2021	How It Ends	Kenny	
2021	Not Going Quietly	—N/a	Executive producer
2021	Tick, Tick... Boom!	Stephen Sondheim	
2022	Rosaline	Adrian Capulet	
2023	I'll Be Right There	Henry	
2025	For Worse	Dave	
2026	Reminders of Him	Patrick Landry	
2026	Office Romance	Peter Vance	

=== Television ===
Year	Title	Role	Notes
1985	The Equalizer	Dillart	Episode: "The Children's Song"
1985–1987	All My Children	Jason	3 episodes
1986	C.A.T. Squad	Leon Trepper	Television film
1987	The Betty Ford Story	Jack Ford	Television film
1988	Guiding Light	Dr. Jones	2 episodes
1988	Tales from the Darkside	Tom Dash	Episode: "The Deal"
1993	Black Tie Affair	Dave Brodsky	5 episodes
1994	NYPD Blue	Norman Gardner	4 episodes
1994	Ellen	Doug	Episode: "The Fix-Up"
1994	The X-Files	Daniel Trepkos	Episode: "Firewalker"
1994	Web of Deception	Larry Lake	Television film
1995	ER	Sean O'Brien	Episodes: "Love's Labor Lost" and "A Miracle Happens Here"
1995	Nothing But the Truth	Lieutenant Thomas 'Mac' McCarthy	Television film
1996	Touched by an Angel	Steven Thomas Bell	Episode: "Out of the Darkness"
1997	Tracey Takes On...	Nik	Episode: "Vegas"
1997	In the Line of Duty: Blaze of Glory	Tom LaSalle	Television film
1997	Cloned	Rick Weston	Television film
1997	High Incident	Deputy Carl Engler	Episode: "Black & Blue"
1998	The Secret Lives of Men	Phil	13 episodes
1999–2006	The West Wing	Josh Lyman	155 episodes
1999	Felicity	Tom Anderson	Episode: "Happy Birthday"; uncredited
1999	Behind the Mask	Brian Shushan	Television film; credited as Brad Whitford
1999	The Sky's On Fire	John Morgan	Television film
2002	Malcolm in the Middle	Meg's Husband	Episode: "Company Picnic: Part 2"
2002	Frasier	Stu	Voice, episode: "Kissing Cousin"
2005	Fathers and Sons	Anthony	Television film
2006–2007	Studio 60 on the Sunset Strip	Danny Tripp	22 episodes
2008	Burn Up	James Mackintosh	2 episodes
2009	Monk	Dean Berry	Episode: "Mr. Monk on Wheels"
2009	Off Duty	Detective Glenn Falcon	Television film; also producer
2010	The Sarah Silverman Program	Toby Grossnickel	Episode: "Nightmayor"
2010	The Good Guys	Detective Dan Stark	20 episodes; also producer
2010	Glenn Martin, DDS	'Gonzo' Gonzales	Voice, episode: "Camp"
2011	In Plain Sight	Adam Wilson / Adam Roston	Episode: "Crazy Like a Witness"
2011	Law & Order: LA	Attorney Miklin	Episode: "Big Rock Mesa"
2011	The Mentalist	Timothy Carter / Red John claimant	3 episodes; uncredited
2011	Have a Little Faith	Mitch Albom	Television film
2012	Parks and Recreation	Councilman Pillner	Episode: "Live Ammo"
2012	The Asset	Leo Maxiell	Television film
2013	Shameless	Abraham Paige	2 episodes
2013	Go On	Huey	Episode: "Ring and a Miss"
2013	Lauren	Paul Milgram	Recurring role, 6 episodes
2013	Drunk History	William Jennings Bryan	Episode: "Nashville"
2013–2014	Trophy Wife	Pete Harrison	Main role
2014	Law & Order: Special Victims Unit	Frank Maddox	Episode: "Reasonable Doubt"
2014–2019	Transparent	Marcy / Magnus Hirschfeld	Recurring role, 8 episodes
2014	Alpha House	Senator Ned	Episode: "The Retreat"
2015–2020	Brooklyn Nine-Nine	Captain Roger Peralta	4 episodes
2015	Happyish	Jonathan Cooke	10 episodes
2016	All the Way	Hubert Humphrey	Television film
2016	Better Things	Gary	Episode: "Sam/Pilot"
2017, 2019	Mom	Mitch	2 episodes
2017	Chicago Justice	Albert Forest	Episode: "Fake"
2017–2019	Rapunzel's Tangled Adventure	King Trevor	Voice, 3 episodes
2018–2025	The Handmaid's Tale	Commander Joseph Lawrence	Main role, 35 episodes
2019	Valley of the Boom	James L. Barksdale	Miniseries
2019	Flack	Calvin Cooper	Episode: "Calvin"
2019–2020	Infinity Train	Agent Sieve	Voice, 5 episodes
2019–2020	Perfect Harmony	Arthur Cochran	Main role; also executive producer
2020	A West Wing Special to Benefit When We All Vote	Josh Lyman	Television special; recreation of "Hartsfield's Landing"
2020, 2026	American Dad!	Vic Mancuso	Voice, 2 episodes
2021	Jurassic World Camp Cretaceous	Mitch	Voice, 5 episodes
2021	What If...?	Colonel John Flynn	Voice, episode: "What If... Captain Carter Were the First Avenger?"
2022	We Baby Bears	Glen	Voice, episode: "Tooth Fairy Tech"
2022	Echo 3	Eric Haas II	3 episodes
2023	Law & Order: Special Victims Unit	Pence Humphreys	Episode: "King of the Moon"
2023	The Wonder Years	Dennis Van Der Kamp	Episode: "Bill's New Friend"
2024	Parish	Anton	4 episodes
2024	The Madness	Stu Magnusson	2 episodes
2025	#1 Happy Family USA	Principal	Voice, episode: "Daughter President!"
2025	Death by Lightning	James Blaine	Miniseries
2025–present	The Diplomat	Todd Penn	Recurring role (season 3), main role (season 4)
2026	The Comeback	Jack Stevens	Episode: "Valerie Cherish"

=== Stage ===
Year	Title	Role	Notes
1985	Curse of the Starving Class	Wesley (Replacement)	Promenade Theater, Off-Broadway
1988	Romeo and Juliet	Paris	Shakespeare in the Park, Off-Broadway
1988	A Midsummer Night's Dream	Theseus/Oberon	Hartford Stage
1989	Measure for Measure	Claudio	Lincoln Center Theatre, Off-Broadway
1990	The Tower of Evil	Gaultier Dolnay	Classic Stage Company, Off-Broadway
1990	A Few Good Men	Lt. Jack Ross (Replacement)/Lt. j.g. Daniel A. Kaffee (Replacement)	Music Box Theatre, Broadway
1991	Coriolanus	Coriolanus	Folger Shakespeare Theatre
1997	Three Days of Rain	Pip/Theo	Manhattan Theatre Club, Off-Broadway
2008	Boeing-Boeing	Bernard	Longacre Theatre, Broadway
2012	Art	Marc	Pasadena Playhouse
2021	A Christmas Carol	Ebenezer Scrooge	National Tour
2023	Peter Pan Goes Wrong	Francis	Ahmanson Theatre
2026	A Few Good Men	Lt. Col. Nathan Jessep	Vivian Beaumont Theater, Broadway

=== Podcasts ===
Year	Title	Role	Notes	Ref.
2021	Batman: The Audio Adventures	Dr. Jonathan Crane/Scarecrow	Voice role	
2022	The Big Lie	Michael Wilson	Voice role	
