= California Proposition 55 =

California Proposition 55 may refer to:

- California Proposition 55 (2004)
- California Proposition 55 (2016)
