= Courage California =

Advocacy organization

Courage California (formerly Courage Campaign)
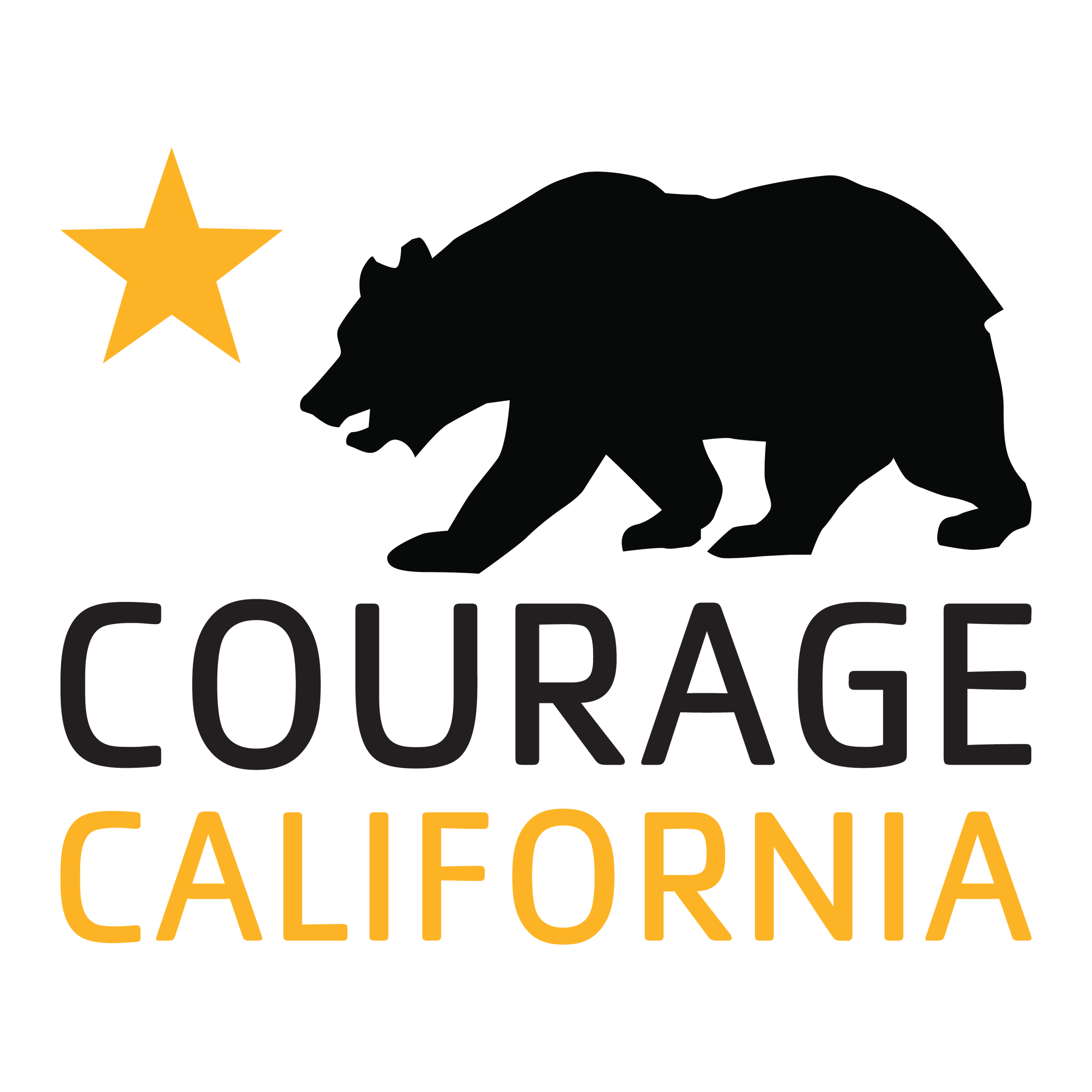
- Formation: November 3, 2006; 20 years ago
- Tax ID no.: 20-4841338
- Legal status: 501(c)(4) advocacy organization
- Purpose: To fight for economic justice, human rights, and corporate and political accountability.
- Location: California
- Chair: Jamie McGurk
- Executive Director: Eddie Kurtz
- Affiliations: Courage California Institute, Courage California Super PAC
- Revenue: $741,899 (2024)
- Expenses: $749,910 (2024)
- Website: couragecalifornia.org

Courage California (formerly Courage Campaign) is a California-based 501(c)(4) progressive grassroots advocacy organization founded in 2005. The organization claims an online grassroots activism network of over 1 million members. The group works on a variety of progressive causes including LGBT equality, gun control and healthcare reform, including support of single-payer health care. The group has taken a role in various California statewide ballot measures, including supporting Proposition 30 and opposing Proposition 32 in 2012.

Courage California's EqualityOnTrial.com was founded to cover the Perry v. Schwarzenegger trial when the courtroom forbade live television coverage. Courage California is an affiliate of the ProgressNow advocacy network.

== Activities ==
In 2011, Courage California organized a flash mob protest against Minnesota Congresswoman Michele Bachmann. Over fifty people danced to Madonna’s hit "Like a Prayer" outside of the 2011 California Republican Party convention. The protest called attention to Bachmann's connections to conversion therapy.

When the California Supreme Court decided it would take six months to rule on the next phase of the Proposition 8 trial, Courage California asked its members for testimony to back the legal challenge of Proposition 8 and other gay-rights litigation. More than 3,000 stories came in.

The group also protested at a fundraiser featuring then-House Speaker John Boehner.

In the wake of the Sandy Hook school shooting, Courage California worked to pressure large retailers, including Walmart, to stop selling assault rifles, joining with SumOfUs, MoveOn.org and MomsRising to deliver hundreds of thousands of signatures to their store in Newtown, Connecticut. Courage California also lobbied Apple to increase the recommended age from 4 to 12 for an NRA shooting app.

In March 2013, the group partnered with the Daily Kos and MoveOn.org to deliver over 100,000 signatures to the Los Angeles Times opposing a sale of the newspaper, owned by the Tribune Company, to Charles and David Koch. Courage California and Daily Kos members also funded a newspaper ad to appear in the pages of the Los Angeles Times. After the advertising department rejected the ad, Courage Campaign staff revised the ad to add six footnote citations of the Los Angeles Times own reporting regarding the Kochs. Following the petition delivery, the advertising department relented and the advertisement ran on April 3, 2013.

Playing on the “It Gets Better” campaign, Courage California worked with the American Bridge 21st Century to critique Mitt Romney during the 2012 presidential elections. This was the first project to track Romney's record on LGBT issues from 1994 to 2012.

== Leadership ==
Courage Campaign, as it was first called, was founded by Rick Jacobs. In 2013, Jacobs took a leave of absence from the group and was replaced by Paul Song. In November 2014, Eddie Kurtz became the executive director.

== Related organizations ==
Courage California Institute is a separately incorporated 501(c)(3) charitable organization that educates, defends, and extends human rights and civil rights.

Courage California Super PAC is a separately incorporated super PAC that supports and opposes candidates for federal office.
