= Illinois Public Pension Amendment =

Proposed amendment to Illinois state constitution

Illinois Public Pension Amendment, 2012
- Concerns the Adoption of a Three-Fifths Approval to Increase Public Pension Benefits

Results
Choice	Votes	%
Yes	2,436,051	56.16%
No	1,901,837	43.84%
Valid votes	4,337,888	100.00%
Invalid or blank votes	0	0.00%
Total votes	4,337,888	100.00%
Yes
60–70%
50–60%
No
60–70%
50–60%

The Illinois Public Pension Amendment was a proposed amendment to the Illinois state constitution. On November 6, 2012, Illinois voters rejected it in a statewide referendum, failing both the 60% threshold and 50% threshold among all ballots cast.

A legislatively referred constitutional amendment, if approved, would have amended the Constitution of Illinois. The measure would have made it so that a three-fifths approval would be required by the General Assembly, city councils, and school districts that wish to increase the pension benefits of their employees.

== Passage in the state legislature ==
In the legislature, the bill that referred the amendment to voters was entitled "HJRCA 49 (2012)" and was sponsored by Michael Madigan. It was required that, in order to qualify for the ballot, the measure be approved by 60% approval of both the Illinois House of Representatives and the Illinois Senate. On April 18, 2012, it passed the House unanimously, 113–0. On May 3, 2012, the bill passed the Senate, 51–2.

== Referendum ==
The amendment was referred to the voters in a referendum during the general election of 2012 Illinois elections on November 6, 2012.

=== Ballot language ===
The ballot text read,

Upon approval by the voters, the proposed amendment, which takes effect on January 9, 2013, adds a new section to the General Provisions Article of the Illinois Constitution. The new section would require a three-fifths majority vote of each chamber of the General Assembly or the governing body of a unit of local government, school district, or pension or retirement system, in order to increase a benefit under any public pension or retirement system. At the general election to be held on November 6, 2012, you will be called upon to decide whether the proposed amendment should become part of the Illinois Constitution.

If you believe the Illinois Constitution should be amended to require a three-fifths majority vote in order to increase a benefit under any public pension or retirement system, you should vote YES on the question. If you believe the Illinois Constitution should not be amended to require a three-fifths majority vote in order to increase a benefit under any public pension or retirement system, you should vote NO on the question. Three-fifths of those voting on the question or a majority of those voting in the election must vote "YES" in order for the amendment to become effective on January 9, 2013.

For the proposed addition of Section 5.1 to Article XIII of the Illinois Constitution.

YES

NO

=== Endorsements ===
Yes

Organizations

- Illinois Municipal League

Officeholders

- Michael Madigan, Speaker of the Illinois House of Representatives
- John Cullerton, President of the Illinois Senate
No

Organizations

- American Federation of State, County and Municipal Employees
- Illinois Policy Institute
- Illinois AFL–CIO
- Illinois Federation of Teachers and the National Education Association
- We Are One

=== Results ===
In order to be approved, the measure required either 60% support among those specifically voting on the amendment or 50% support among all ballots cast in the elections. The measure failed to achieve either.

Illinois Public Pension Amendment
Option	Votes	% of votes on measure	% of all ballots cast
Yes	2,436,051	56.16	46.52
No	1,901,837	43.84	36.32
Total votes	4,337,888	100	82.84
Voter turnout	57.68%		
