= 2012 Illinois elections =

- November 6, 2012
- Turnout: 70.20%

Elections were held in Illinois on November 6, 2012.

Primaries were held March 20.

== Election information ==
=== Turnout ===
==== Primary election ====
For the primary election, turnout was 23.20%, with 1,694,317 votes cast.

Turnout by county

County	Registration	Votes cast	Turnout
Adams	43,192	9,872	22.86%
Alexander	7,447	781	10.49%
Bond	12,073	1,809	14.98%
Boone	30,735	7,288	23.71%
Brown	3,524	757	21.48%
Bureau	23,713	5,841	24.63%
Calhoun	3,604	1,804	50.06%
Carroll	10,955	3,272	29.87%
Cass	9,381	1,268	13.52%
Champaign	124,696	26,212	21.02%
Christian	21,192	4,557	21.5%
Clark	12,683	3,224	25.42%
Clay	9,862	1,788	18.13%
Clinton	26,116	3,634	13.91%
Coles	29,284	7,853	26.82%
Cook (Note: For more on Cook County general election turnout, see 2012 Cook County, Illinois elections#Voter turnout)	2,682,942	644,701	24.03%
Crawford	13,999	3,259	23.28%
Cumberland	7,793	2,026	26%
DeKalb	53,602	12,534	23.38%
DeWitt	11,358	4,624	40.71%
Douglas	11,717	3,731	31.84%
DuPage	526,358	138,281	26.27%
Edgar	13,112	2,899	22.11%
Edwards	4,476	1,130	25.25%
Effingham	22,429	6,468	28.84%
Fayette	15,129	2,533	16.74%
Ford	8,534	2,924	34.26%
Franklin	29,646	8,759	29.55%
Fulton	25,130	5,166	20.56%
Gallatin	4,023	1,949	48.45%
Greene	8,845	2,800	31.66%
Grundy	29,301	6,932	23.66%
Hamilton	5,594	2,171	38.81%
Hancock	12,319	4,272	34.68%
Hardin	3,099	1,295	41.79%
Henderson	4,960	962	19.4%
Henry	35,006	6,170	17.63%
Iroquois	18,559	5,865	31.6%
Jackson	38,995	6,408	16.43%
Jasper	6,687	1,749	26.16%
Jefferson	23,510	8,241	35.05%
Jersey	17,462	2,739	15.69%
Jo Daviess	15,744	4,735	30.07%
Johnson	7,971	2,897	36.34%
Kane	256,859	52,803	20.56%
Kankakee	62,764	12,428	19.8%
Kendall	66,242	14,370	21.69%
Knox	33,505	6,307	18.82%
Lake	385,905	91,138	23.62%
LaSalle	71,201	14,651	20.58%
Lawrence	10,663	1,904	17.86%
Lee	23,561	6,035	25.61%
Livingston	21,117	7,477	35.41%
Logan	19,414	4,475	23.05%
Macon	74,606	15,745	21.1%
Macoupin	30,794	7,498	24.35%
Madison	181,390	28,914	15.94%
Marion	24,500	3,958	16.16%
Marshall	8,282	1,908	23.04%
Mason	10,385	3,142	30.26%
Massac	12,600	2,152	17.08%
McDonough	17,975	4,865	27.07%
McHenry	199,027	39,242	19.72%
McLean	94,299	25,137	26.66%
Menard	8,539	1,847	21.63%
Mercer	11,730	3,896	33.21%
Monroe	23,440	4,501	19.2%
Montgomery	18,416	3,624	19.68%
Morgan	20,722	6,397	30.87%
Moultrie	8,399	2,095	24.94%
Ogle	33,831	9,937	29.37%
Peoria	116,216	22,502	19.36%
Perry	13,898	2,532	18.22%
Piatt	11,531	3,720	32.26%
Pike	11,473	4,116	35.88%
Pope	3,185	1,234	38.74%
Pulaski	5,879	890	15.14%
Putnam	4,139	1,473	35.59%
Randolph	23,119	5,797	25.07%
Richland	12,256	2,208	18.02%
Rock Island	87,636	21,308	24.31%
Saline	15,845	3,816	24.08%
Sangamon	140,897	26,255	18.63%
Schuyler	5,243	1,554	29.64%
Scott	3,976	1,423	35.79%
Shelby	14,579	3,699	25.37%
Stark	4,036	907	22.47%
St. Clair	179,904	34,203	19.01%
Stephenson	35,015	7,369	21.05%
Tazewell	85,816	20,837	24.28%
Union	15,091	4,686	31.05%
Vermilion	47,289	8,476	17.92%
Wabash	9,234	1,366	14.79%
Warren	11,490	2,918	25.4%
Washington	9,705	3,984	41.05%
Wayne	12,770	2,611	20.45%
White	10,624	2,268	21.35%
Whiteside	36,956	6,919	18.72%
Will	371,928	78,877	21.21%
Williamson	41,555	10,658	25.65%
Winnebago	180,059	43,627	24.23%
Woodford	26,066	7,458	28.61%
Total	7,304,333	1,694,317	23.2%

==== General election ====
For the general election, turnout was 70.20%, with 5,279,752 votes cast.

Turnout by county

County	Registration	Votes cast	Turnout
Adams	45,172	31,056	68.75%
Alexander	5,435	3,562	65.54%
Bond	12,456	7,449	59.8%
Boone	32,411	21,509	66.36%
Brown	3,985	2,415	60.6%
Bureau	23,588	16,786	71.16%
Calhoun	3,679	2,654	72.14%
Carroll	11,182	7,429	66.44%
Cass	9,391	4,922	52.41%
Champaign	112,933	78,939	69.9%
Christian	21,826	14,847	68.02%
Clark	12,679	7,955	62.74%
Clay	10,043	6,017	59.91%
Clinton	23,801	16,590	69.7%
Coles	32,119	21,532	67.04%
Cook (Note: For more on Cook County primary turnout, see 2012 Cook County, Illinois elections#Voter turnout)	2,781,182	2,030,563	73.01%
Crawford	14,232	8,675	60.95%
Cumberland	7,926	5,360	67.63%
DeKalb	57,915	41,428	71.53%
DeWitt	11,628	7,414	63.76%
Douglas	11,801	7,961	67.46%
DuPage	560,718	403,312	71.93%
Edgar	13,228	7,869	59.49%
Edwards	4,536	3,291	72.55%
Effingham	23,115	16,825	72.79%
Fayette	15,072	9,086	60.28%
Ford	8,875	6,069	68.38%
Franklin	29,925	18,184	60.77%
Fulton	25,496	15,495	60.77%
Gallatin	4,052	2,648	65.35%
Greene	9,018	5,737	63.62%
Grundy	30,820	21,419	69.5%
Hamilton	5,746	4,055	70.57%
Hancock	12,529	9,275	74.03%
Hardin	3,528	2,421	68.62%
Henderson	5,019	3,639	72.5%
Henry	36,186	24,594	67.97%
Iroquois	18,860	12,881	68.3%
Jackson	42,361	24,307	57.38%
Jasper	6,827	5,121	75.01%
Jefferson	24,396	16,605	68.06%
Jersey	17,744	10,119	57.03%
Jo Daviess	16,171	11,565	71.52%
Johnson	8,172	5,754	70.41%
Kane	272,843	182,747	66.98%
Kankakee	64,366	45,864	71.26%
Kendall	68,453	47,565	69.49%
Knox	33,417	23,501	70.33%
Lake	406,567	289,385	71.18%
LaSalle	71,565	47,748	66.72%
Lawrence	10,504	6,084	57.92%
Lee	21,843	15,439	70.68%
Livingston	21,718	15,162	69.81%
Logan	19,471	12,182	62.56%
Macon	76,201	49,308	64.71%
Macoupin	31,882	21,236	66.61%
Madison	179,256	123,834	69.08%
Marion	24,817	15,952	64.28%
Marshall	8,454	5,928	70.12%
Mason	10,422	6,348	60.91%
Massac	10,756	6,590	61.27%
McDonough	19,154	12,619	65.88%
McHenry	203,225	134,550	66.21%
McLean	102,522	73,827	72.01%
Menard	8,751	6,213	71%
Mercer	12,020	8,652	71.98%
Monroe	23,827	17,582	73.79%
Montgomery	18,344	12,314	67.13%
Morgan	21,484	14,222	66.2%
Moultrie	8,672	6,114	70.5%
Ogle	34,994	23,533	67.25%
Peoria	115,999	79,473	68.51%
Perry	14,172	9,685	68.34%
Piatt	11,817	8,785	74.34%
Pike	11,851	7,377	62.25%
Pope	3,021	2,254	74.61%
Pulaski	5,835	3,044	52.17%
Putnam	4,248	3,178	74.81%
Randolph	21,863	14,609	66.82%
Richland	11,555	7,365	63.74%
Rock Island	91,636	65,574	71.56%
Saline	16,467	10,956	66.53%
Sangamon	132,634	95,166	71.75%
Schuyler	5,283	3,951	74.79%
Scott	4,098	2,616	63.84%
Shelby	14,916	10,515	70.49%
Stark	4,133	2,701	65.35%
St. Clair	188,420	120,502	63.95%
Stephenson	33,328	21,239	63.73%
Tazewell	89,276	61,568	68.96%
Union	11,970	8,413	70.28%
Vermilion	48,202	30,611	63.51%
Wabash	9,132	5,182	56.75%
Warren	12,010	7,883	65.64%
Washington	10,073	7,518	74.64%
Wayne	12,933	7,744	59.88%
White	10,918	7,149	65.48%
Whiteside	38,166	25,994	68.11%
Will	386,172	279,352	72.34%
Williamson	43,614	29,519	67.68%
Winnebago	174,909	110,970	63.44%
Woodford	28,765	19,026	66.14%
Total	7,520,722	5,279,752	70.2%

== Federal elections ==
=== United States President ===
Illinois voted for the Democratic ticket of Barack Obama and Joe Biden.

This was the sixth consecutive presidential election in which Illinois had voted for the Democratic ticket.

=== United States House ===
Illinois had lost one seat in the reapportionment following the 2010 United States census. All 18 of Illinois' remaining seats in the United States House of Representatives were up for election in 2012.

Before the election, Republicans held 11 and Democrats held 8 seats from Illinois. In 2002, Democrats won 12 seats while Republicans won 6.

== State elections ==
=== State Senate ===
One-third of the seats of the Illinois Senate were up for election in 2012.

=== State House of Representatives ===
All of the seats in the Illinois House of Representatives were up for election in 2012.

=== Judicial elections ===
Judicial elections were held.

=== Ballot measure ===
Illinois voters voted on a single ballot measure in 2012. In order to be approved, the measure required either 60% support among those specifically voting on the amendment or 50% support among all ballots cast in the elections.

==== Illinois Public Pension Amendment ====
Illinois voters rejected the proposed Illinois Public Pension Amendment, a legislatively referred constitutional amendment. This would have amended the Constitution of Illinois. The measure would have made it so that a three-fifths approval would be required by the General Assembly, city councils, and school districts that wish to increase the pension benefits of their employees.

Illinois Public Pension Amendment
Option	Votes	% of votes on measure	% of all ballots cast
Yes	1,901,837	43.84	36.32
No	2,436,051	56.16	46.52
Total votes	4,337,888	100	82.84
Voter turnout	57.68%		

== Local elections ==
Local elections were held. These included county elections, such as the Cook County elections.
