= 2016 California Proposition 55 =

Proposition 55
- Tax Extension for Education and Healthcare

Results
Choice	Votes	%
Yes	8,594,273	63.27%
No	4,988,329	36.73%
Valid votes	13,582,602	92.96%
Invalid or blank votes	1,027,907	7.04%
Total votes	14,610,509	100.00%
Registered voters/turnout	19,411,771	75.27%
County results
Yes
70–80%
60–70%
50–60%
No
50–60%

Proposition 55 is a California ballot proposition that passed on the November 8, 2016 ballot, regarding extending by twelve years the temporary personal income tax increases enacted in 2012 on earnings over $250,000, with revenues allocated to K–12 schools, California Community Colleges, and, in certain years, healthcare. Proposition 55 will raise tax revenue by between $4 billion and $9 billion a year. Half of funds will go to schools and community colleges, up to $2 billion a year would go to Medi-Cal, and up to $1.5 billion will be saved and applied to debt.

== History ==
California voters passed temporary sales and income tax increases with Proposition 30 in 2012. During the temporary tax, California's top 1% of earners paid half of the state's income-taxes and contributed one third of its budget. Since the 2012 tax increase, California's tax revenues have grown by nearly 30%, with roughly two thirds of the money going to schools.

Proposition 55 allowed the sales tax increase to expire as planned, while maintaining the increased income tax rates and extended them through 2030. Governor Jerry Brown, who was the primary proponent of the tax increase in 2012, remained neutral on Proposition 55.

== Campaigning ==
Proponents spent $58.6 million fighting for the measure, with the top donor being $25 million from a hospital trade association. An additional $20 million was donated by the California Teachers Association, with other top donors including the Service Employees International Union, and the California School Employees Association. The measure was supported by the editorial boards of The Sacramento Bee and The Mercury News.

Opponents spent $3,000 fighting against the measure. The California Chamber of Commerce, who were neutral on the 2012 tax increase, opposed Proposition 55. The measure was opposed by the editorial boards of the Los Angeles Times, the San Francisco Chronicle, and The Wall Street Journal.

== Results ==
A September 2016 poll by the Public Policy Institute of California showed that 54% of likely voters supported Proposition 55, 38% opposed it, and 8% did not know how they would vote.

Proposition 55 was approved by voters in the November general election, with 63% voting yes.
