= 2012 California Proposition 31 =

Proposition 31
- November 6, 2012
- Two-Year State Budget Cycle Initiative

Results
Choice	Votes	%
Yes	4,642,088	39.48%
No	7,115,164	60.52%
Total votes	11,757,252	100.00%
- County results No 60–70% 50–60%

The 2012 California Proposition 31 was officially titled "State Budget. State and Local Government. Initiative Constitutional Amendment and Statute." It was a California ballot measure in the November 2012 California elections. The initiative would have established a two-year state budget, allowed the governor to make budget cuts in fiscal emergencies, prevented the state state legislature from spending more than $25 million without creating spending cuts or other budget offsets, and allowed local governments the ability to transfer certain amounts of property taxes among themselves instead of the state. Although the law was supported by the California Republican Party, multiple conservative groups came out against proposition 31, including members of the Tea Party movement who viewed the law as a way to undermine property rights.

== Analysis ==
If Proposition 31 had passed, it was estimated that the state government would have suffered a loss of $200 million, as these funds would have been transferred to local governments.

== Editorial endorsements ==
Newspaper	Position
Bay Area Reporter	Oppose
Fresno Bee	Support
Los Angeles Daily News	Support
Los Angeles Times	Oppose
Modesto Bee	Support
Orange County Register	Oppose
Sacramento Bee	Oppose
San Diego Union-Tribune	Support
San Francisco Bay Guardian	Oppose
San Francisco Chronicle	Support
San Jose Mercury News	Support
Ventura County Star	Oppose
