= 2012 California Proposition 39 =

Referendum modifying corporate tax burdens

Proposition 39
- Tax Treatment For Multistate Businesses

Results
Choice	Votes	%
Yes	7,384,416	61.10%
No	4,701,562	38.90%
Total votes	12,085,978	100.00%
County results
Yes
70–80%
60–70%
50–60%
No
60–70%
50–60%

Proposition 39 is a ballot initiative in the state of California that modifies the way out-of-state corporations calculate their income tax burdens. The proposition was approved by voters in the November 6 general election, with 61.1% voting in favor of it.

Supporters of Proposition 39 claimed that it will close a tax loophole that currently rewards out-of-state companies for taking jobs out of California and, for tax purposes, treats out-of-state companies the way California-based companies are treated. The savings generated by closing the loophole will be directed to fund public schools and create jobs in the state, especially construction jobs in the clean energy sector. Opponents argued that Proposition 39 is simply a tax increase, and it will make out-of-state companies less likely to do business in California. The proposition does not affect California-based companies or California residents.

The nonpartisan California Legislative Analyst's Office has determined that changing the way out-of-state corporations are taxed in California will generate approximately $1 billion in revenue and create 40,000 jobs.

The primary financial backer of Proposition 39 was Thomas Steyer, who also played a lead role in designing the initiative. California State Senator Kevin de León served as the co-chairman of the Prop 39 campaign.

California State Controller John Chiang appointed three members to a board created to oversee the Allocation of new funds related to the California Clean Energy Jobs Act. The three board members include: Gary Kremen, the founder of Match.Com also a clean technology engineer, entrepreneur and inventor; Erik Emblem, executive administrator and chief operating officer of the Western States Council-Sheet Metal Workers in Sacramento; and Dana Cuff, professor of Architecture and Urban Planning at the University of California, Los Angeles.

== Background ==
In 2009, Sacramento legislators changed corporate tax law so that out-of-state companies could choose between two methods for calculating their California income tax. Companies could choose either the "three-factor" or "single-sales factor" method. The three-factor method bases half of a company's tax bill on in-state sales and the other half on in-state property and employees.

A company with ample sales but no physical presence in the state significantly reduces its tax burden when choosing the three-factor method. The change was part of a balanced budget deal between Arnold Schwarzenegger and state Republicans. California is the only state that allows out-of-state companies to choose how their income tax is calculated.

Supporters of Proposition 39 include San Francisco-based philanthropist and businessman Thomas Steyer, who founded Farallon Capital, a hedge fund, and One Pacific Bank, a community bank. Steyer, a signer of The Giving Pledge, has contributed $21.9 million of his own money to a campaign in favor of the initiative. In 2010, Steyer co-chaired the successful effort to beat Proposition 23, a ballot initiative to overturn California's climate change laws.

The League of Conservative Voters has contributed $25,000 to the campaign, while the Western States Council of Sheet Metal Workers PAC has added $5,000.

Similar laws have been passed in New Jersey, Illinois, and Texas. New Jersey Republican Governor Chris Christie called closing the loophole an important part of the New Jersey comeback.

=== Assembly Bill 1500 ===
John A. Pérez, a state representative from Los Angeles, introduced Assembly Bill 1500 in 2012. The legislation seeks to remove the three-factor method from the state tax code. As of August 31, 2012, AB 1500 had failed to gain the necessary support to move forward. The extra tax revenue generated by AB 1500 would have reduced tuition costs for state university students by up to two-thirds for families making less than $150,000 per year. A number of large out-of-state companies opposed the bill.

== The measure ==
Proposition 39 removes the ability for out-of-state corporations to choose how to calculate their California tax burden. If passed, all companies doing business in the state would use the single-sales factor method, which only uses sales to calculate income tax.

Proposition 39 also contains instructions on how the extra tax revenue —approximately $1 billion each year—will be spent. For the first five years, half of the new tax revenue would be spent on clean energy projects. The other half would go to the state's general fund. After five years, all extra monies would go to the general fund.

Supporters of the measure mention four companies in particular that have been particularly advantaged by the current law. These are Chrysler Group, General Motors, International Paper, and Kimberly-Clark. In September 2012, however, Procter & Gamble and Chrysler both announced they wouldn't oppose Proposition 39.

In 2011, Genentech executive Andrea Jackson explained that her company located a new facility in Oregon to take advantage of the three-factor method. She said that California tax law encouraged the company to move facilities out of the state.

A recent study by the independent research firm Beacon Economics claims that Proposition 39 could limit liability incentives for out-of-state businesses.

== Analysis ==
=== Positive effects ===
According to independent analyses, passage of Proposition 39 would add $1 billion to state revenue. It would also remove the advantage of building new facilities or hiring employees out-of-state. Supporters say that the measure would create up to 40,000 new jobs. Environmental and health groups claim that the extra money for clean energy projects would lead to safer schools and improved public health. The editorial board of The Sacramento Bee said that Proposition 39 represented "how direct democracy should work."

=== Negative effects ===
Opponents of Proposition 39 argue that companies will do less business with California because of higher taxes. They claim that the some form of the three-factor method has been in the tax code since 1966. Others fear that the proposition will add more bureaucracy and complexity to an already bloated tax law. They also point to California's unfriendly business tax climate: The state ranks 48th, according to the Tax Foundation.

== Endorsements ==
As of September 2012, the Los Angeles Times, the Sacramento Bee, the San Jose Mercury News, the San Francisco Chamber of Commerce, California State Assembly Speaker John Perez, the California Labor Federation, California State Senate President pro Tem Darrell Steinberg, and former U.S. Secretary of State to Ronald Reagan, George Shultz, had endorsed the initiative.

On September 26, 2012, the California Democratic Party Chairman, John Burton, announced his endorsement of Proposition 39. Other recent endorsements of the initiative include the San Francisco Chamber of Commerce, the American Lung Association, Latin Business Association, California Labor Federation, California Community College Trustees, and the California League of Conservation Voters.

As of October 1, 2012, General Motors, International Paper, Kimberly Clark, Chrysler and Procter & Gamble will not oppose Proposition 39 any further.

The Simi Valley Chamber of Commerce, Carpinteria Valley Chamber of Commerce, the Oxnard Chamber of Commerce, and the United Chambers of Commerce all oppose Proposition 39.

== Editorial opinion ==
=== "Yes on 39" ===
- The Bakersfield Californian is in support of the initiative, stating that, "It's time to fix a bad tax policy, created three years ago by the California Legislature, once and for all."
- The Contra Costa Times favors Proposition 39. They write, "State lawmakers have refused to correct the mistake they made in 2009 when, in a late-night budget session, they created a tax incentive for companies to locate outside California. Voters need to fix it for them on Nov. 6 by voting for Proposition 39."
- The Daily Democrat (Woodland, California): "Vote yes on this initiative to end a system that lets out-of-state corporations choose their methods of taxation."
- The Fresno Bee endorsed Proposition 39 on October 1, 2012. They wrote, "If it's approved, the initiative would generate $1 billion a year."
- The Los Angeles Times has endorsed Proposition 39. In a September 27, 2012 opinion piece, they wrote that, "Proposition 39, would raise an estimated $1 billion a year, about half of which would be dedicated temporarily to making public buildings more energy efficient."
- The Marin Independent Journal: "This measure needs to be on the ballot because the state Legislature has refused to close a business tax loophole it approved in a late-night budget decision in 2009."
- The Merced Sun-Star: "The initiative on the Nov. 6 ballot would close a $1 billion corporate tax loophole, one that legislators are incapable of shutting because they are beholden to outside influences."
- The Modesto Bee favors Proposition 39, writing, "Proposition 39 shows how direct democracy should work."
- The Oakland Tribune formally endorsed Proposition 39, writing "Prop. 39 will help keep businesses here."
- The Press-Enterprise: "California has no need for a tax break that puts the state at an economic disadvantage."
- The Redding Record Searchlight has endorsed Proposition 39, writing, "[Proposition 39] ends a billion-dollar giveaway to out-of-state corporations."
- The Sacramento Bee has endorsed Proposition 39. The newspaper advocated that voters approve the measure, writing, "Essentially, out-of-state corporations such as cigarette maker Altria gained the privilege to determine which of two methods of taxation allowed them to pay the least in state taxes, and they are allowed to toggle back and forth each year so as to gain the greatest benefit,... Proposition 39 shows how direct democracy should work."
- The San Diego Free Press has announced support for Proposition 39. They wrote that, "Proposition 39 would eliminate the ability of companies to choose between two methods to calculate their taxable income in California and require them to use sales only for the calculation."
- The San Jose Mercury News endorsed Proposition 39, writing, "State lawmakers have so far refused to correct the mistake they made in 2009 when, in a late-night budget session, they created a tax incentive for companies to locate outside California. Voters will be able to fix it for them Nov. 6 by voting yes on Proposition 39."
- The San Francisco Bay Guardian: "It's more fair, it creates the right incentives to keep jobs and equipment in the state, and it cuts a hole in the deficit."
- The Santa Cruz Sentinel: "Ballot-budgeting? Yes. But as it stands, Steyer's Prop. 39 revenue would help create jobs while also cutting down on energy use and greenhouse gas emissions at public buildings -- and the revenue directed toward these causes is limited to five years. More importantly, the tax loophole is egregious and only encourages multistate companies doing business in California to create jobs outside the state."

=== "No on 39" ===
- The San Francisco Chronicle opposed the initiative in a September editorial, stating that, "Proposition 39, which would direct about half of the extra $1 billion in annual revenue to energy-efficient projects, corrupts a very good idea (tax reform) with a very bad one (ballot-box budgeting)."
- The San Diego Union Tribune opposed the initiative, writing, "We recommend a no vote on Proposition 39."
- The Ventura County Star opposed Proposition 39, stating, "Supporters of Proposition 39 may have had good intentions, but this initiative on the Nov. 6 ballot doesn't measure up to reasonable expectations. The Star recommends a no vote."
- The Pasadena Star-News opposed Proposition 39, writing that, "PROPOSITION 39 is a mixed bag - like so many of the initiatives that appear on California's ballots - that should be rejected."
- The San Bernardino Sun opposed the initiative, writing, "Of the $1 billion or so in additional tax revenue that change would produce, Proposition 39 directs half into energy efficiency and alternative energy projects for four years."
- The editorial board of the Appeal-Democrat opposed Proposition 39 in an editorial in May, writing, "Steyer said the initiative would create green jobs. But taxes kill jobs by sucking money out of the private sector. Similar green-jobs claims were made about Assembly Bill 32, the Global Warming Solutions Act of 2006, by Gov. Arnold Schwarzenegger. But A.B. 32 didn't prevent state unemployment from soaring well above the national rate. California's real employment problem is not a lack of green jobs, but the state's severe anti-jobs climate, to which A.B. 32 and the specter of Steyer's initiative contribute."
- The Los Angeles Daily News wrote "...the measure has two big problems: One, it's yet another example of ballot-box budgeting, directing half the revenue that would be generated into niche projects instead of into the general fund; and two, it goes back on a budget deal that the Legislature made three years ago."
- The San Gabriel Valley Tribune: "California can't stand any more ballot-box budgeting that squirrels away money for a single purpose favored by an initiative's proponents - in this case a hedge-fund billionaire. Proposition 39 creates the Clean Energy Job Creation Fund, another otherwise untouchable pot of money like the First 5 and mental health funds that past initiatives have given us. The purposes are good, but they should be weighed against other priorities like education and care for the indigent and elderly."

== Legislative Implementation ==
After Proposition 39's passage, the California Legislature enacted Senate Bill 73 (Committee on Budget and Fiscal Review, Chapter 29, Statutes of 2013) to direct the Proposition 39 funds in accordance with the measure. The Legislature directed most of the measure's revenues to school districts, community colleges, county offices of education, charter schools, and state special schools to undertake energy efficiency and clean energy projects. The Legislature directed a smaller portion of revenues to an energy conservation revolving loan fund, and energy-related workforce development for disadvantaged youth and veterans. To implement the programs, the legislation designated the California Energy Commission as the lead agency to work in consultation with the California Department of Education, California Community Colleges Chancellor's Office, California Public Utilities Commission, California Workforce Development Board, the Division of the State Architect, the California Department of Industrial Relations, and the California Conservation Corps.

== Outcome ==
The California Clean Energy Jobs Act Citizens Oversight Board is the entity tasked with overseeing the implementation of Proposition 39. Many have criticized the implementation of Proposition 39 for its slow start, but the California Energy Commission claims the slowness is due to a variety of reasons, including the necessary legislative and regulatory processes to get the program running, and the lack of capacity at under resourced K-12 schools to apply for funding and implement projects.

Over the first three years of implementation, the measure has delivered $1.178 billion in revenue, which is less than the $1.5 billion the Legislative Analyst's Office had originally projected. In 2013, the Don Vial Center on the Green Economy projected that Proposition 39 would create an estimated 3,410 direct jobs and 7,843 indirect and induced jobs annually, but in 2015, the Associated Press estimated that only 1,700 jobs had been created in the first three years. The data regarding school energy consumption reductions are not yet available, but the school projects are on a publicly searchable database.
