= 2012 California Proposition 32 =

Proposition 32
- November 6, 2012
- Political Contributions by Payroll Deduction

Results
Choice	Votes	%
Yes	5,400,218	43.40%
No	7,043,915	56.60%
Total votes	12,444,133	100.00%
County results
For
50–60%
Against
70–80%
60–70%
50–60%

Proposition 32 is a California ballot measure that was decided by California voters at the statewide election on November 6, 2012. This initiative statute would have affected political contributions via payroll deductions, and contributions to political candidates. The proposition was defeated by voters by a margin of 56 to 44 percent.

== Details ==
Proposition 32 would have done the following:

- Prohibit unions from using payroll-deducted funds for political purposes (the same restriction applying to payroll deductions, if any, by corporations and government contractors)
- Permit voluntary employee contributions to an employee-sponsored committee or union with yearly written authorization.
- Ban contributions to candidates and candidate-controlled committees by corporations and labor unions. Other political expenditures remain unrestricted if not limited due to being from payroll deductions.
- Ban contractors who receive government contracts (including public-sector labor unions with collective bargaining agreements) from donating to office holders involved in awarding the contract or committees controlled by said officers.

== Editorial opinions ==
The North County Times stated that Proposition 32 "does nothing to stifle unions' political voices—despite claims to the contrary. Prop. 32 simply institutes an opt-in system for each employee's political donations."

The Los Angeles Daily News noted that Proposition 32 leaves the decision on how to contribute political funds to workers, not unions. In other words, "unions will still have the power of numbers. Their members will continue to be able to mobilize in support of candidates and political stands, and to donate money on their own, but it would be their decision."

According to the Press Enterprise, "The meat of Prop. 32 is a ban on the use of payroll deductions to finance political spending. That provision targets one of the largest special interests in California politics: public employee unions. Automatic deductions from paychecks are the primary way unions fund political campaigns — and ending that financing mechanism would ease unions’ stranglehold on political decisions."

In mid-August 2012, Los Angeles Times' columnist Michael Hiltzik wrote that the proposition would exempt "such common business structures as LLCs, partnerships and real estate trusts", that the drafters included "conservative attorneys Thomas Hiltachk and Michael Capaldi", and concluded by citing a statistic that "business outspends organized labor 15 to 1". Supporters say the proposition allows workers to decide where their money is spent; opponents say it is a bill designed for corporations to legally fund millions of dollars to their candidates.

The Wall Street Journal published a late-August 2012 profile of pro-proposition campaigner and former Democratic state legislator Gloria Romero who said that unions were too powerful in Sacramento and "must be brought down" before they cause the state to become bankrupt. Romero said it was "telling" that advertisements against the measure "don't mention unions."

On Labor Day weekend, political science professor and associate vice president of the California Faculty Association Andy Merrifield and League of Women Voters representative Dee Dee Bridges wrote against the proposition as "a particularly cynical ballot initiative ... to deny participation in the political process to working people".
