= 2012 California Proposition 38 =

Proposition 38
- Tax for Education. Early Childhood Programs

Results
Choice	Votes	%
Yes	3,541,199	28.72%
No	8,789,890	71.28%
Total votes	12,331,089	100.00%
County results
No
80–90%
70–80%
60–70%

Proposition 38, officially titled Tax for Education. Early Childhood Programs, was a California ballot measure that was rejected by California voters at the statewide election on November 6, 2012. The proposition proposed increased funding to K-12 schools and early education programs through increased state tax revenue.

The following justifications for the proposition were officially advanced: Public schools require more government funding to nurture student learning, promote more student activities, and to provide more extracurricular activities. Getting proper funding and allocating it correctly have always been a challenge for public schools. With this funding schools can keep textbooks up to date and have adequate computer resources. With additional funds they can organize more field trips or out of class activities for the students. Sports and additional extracurricular classes can be offered with increased funding as well. Public schools demand more government funding to encourage student learning, promote more student activities, and to provide more extracurricular activities.

The proposition was created and largely funded by Pasadena civil rights attorney Molly Munger.
