= 2012 California Proposition 30 =

Referendum on taxes

Proposition 30
- Temporary Taxes to Fund Education

Results
Choice	Votes	%
Yes	7,014,114	55.37%
No	5,653,636	44.63%
Total votes	12,667,750	100.00%
- Results by county

Proposition 30, officially titled Temporary Taxes to Fund Education, is a California ballot measure that was decided by California voters at the statewide election on November 6, 2012. The initiative is a measure to increase taxes to prevent US$6 billion cuts to the education budget for California state schools. The measure was approved by California voters by a margin of 55 to 45%.

Proposition 30 provides for a personal income tax increase over seven years for California residents with an annual income over US$250,000, to be implemented retroactively starting January 1, 2012, through the end of 2018. The measure also provides for an increase in the state sales tax by 0.25 percent over 4 years (from January 1, 2013 through December 31, 2016).

The sales tax increase expired as planned at the end of 2016. The higher income tax rates were extended for 12 years through the end of 2030 with the passage of Proposition 55 in 2016.

== Campaigning ==
California governor Jerry Brown supported and campaigned for the passage of Proposition 30. The governor described the proposition as essential for preserving education funding, stating that "The California dream is built on great public schools and colleges and universities." The "Yes on 30" campaign raised US$69 million in campaign funds.

The National Federation of Independent Business, the Small Business Action Committee, and the Howard Jarvis Taxpayers Association opposed the bill, arguing that the increased taxes would hurt small businesses and job growth.

== Tax changes ==
Proposition 30 raised the statewide sales tax rate from 7.25% to 7.50%, effective January 1, 2013. Many local municipalities impose additional sales taxes on top of the standard statewide rate.

Marginal income tax rates remained unchanged for single filers under $250,000; joint filers under $500,000; and head of household filers under $340,000, ranging from 1% to 9.3% Above these income thresholds, new marginal tax rates were created by the passage of Prop 30:

New marginal tax rates and income brackets for 2012
Marginal tax rate	Single or married filing separately	Married filing jointly or qualified widow(er)	Head of household
10.3%	$250,001 – $300,000	$500,001 – $600,000	$340,001 – $408,000
11.3%	$300,001 – $500,000	$600,001 – $1,000,000	$408,001 – $680,000
12.3%	$500,001+	$1,000,001+	$680,001+

Prop 30 provides that, as with existing tax brackets, these income brackets shall be adjusted for inflation each year. As previous to Prop 30 there is an additional 1% tax applicable to single and married filers with taxable income of over $1,000,000.

=== Revenue projections ===
According to the 2013-14 Governor's Budget Summary, released on January 10, 2013, Proposition 30 is estimated to increase personal income tax revenues by $3.2 billion in fiscal year 2011‑12, $4.8 billion in FY 2012‑13, and $4.9 billion in FY 2013‑14. It is estimated to increase sales and use tax revenues by $611 million in FY 2012‑13 and $1.3 billion in FY 2013‑14.

== Relationship to Proposition 38 ==
Proposition 30 conflicted with another measure on the November 6, 2012 ballot: Proposition 38. The Constitution of California specifies that if two conflicting measures both pass, the one with the most votes will go into effect where it conflicts with the one that receives the lesser number of votes, but that any provisions in the latter that don’t conflict with the winning proposition will still go into effect.

Prop 30 provided that, if it passed with a greater number of votes, nothing in Prop 38 would go into effect. Because Proposition 38 failed, this provision was not enacted. Prop 38 provided that, if it passed with a greater number of votes, the tax-increase provisions of Prop 30 would not go into effect. Any provisions of Prop 30 not related to tax increases would still go into effect, such as the “trigger cuts” to expenditures.
