= List of California ballot propositions: 2000–2009 =

U.S. President
- 1852; 1856; 1860; 1864; 1868; 1872; 1876; 1880; 1884; 1888; 1892; 1896; 1900; 1904; 1908; 1912; 1916; 1920; 1924; 1928; 1932; 1936; 1940; 1944; 1948; 1952; 1956; 1960; 1964; 1968; 1972; 1976; 1980; 1984; 1988; 1992; 1996; Dem; Rep; 2000; Dem; Rep; 2004; Dem; Rep; 2008; Dem; Rep; 2012; Dem; Rep; 2016; Dem; Rep; 2020; Dem; Rep; 2024; Dem; Rep

List of California ballot propositions: 2000–2009

== Elections ==
=== March 7, 2000 ===
- 1A – Passed – Gambling on Tribal Lands. Legislative Constitutional Amendment.
- 12 – Passed – Safe Neighborhood Parks, Clean Water, Clean Air, and Coastal Protection Bond Act of 2000.
- 13 – Passed – Safe Drinking Water, Clean Water, Watershed Protection, and Flood Protection Bond Act.
- 14 – Passed – California Reading and Literacy Improvement and Public Library Construction and Renovation Bond Act of 2000
- 15 – Failed – The Hertzberg-Polanco Crime Laboratories Construction Bond Act of 1999.
- 16 – Passed – Veterans Homes Bond Act of 2000.
- 17 – Passed – Lotteries. Charitable Raffles. Legislative Constitutional Amendment.
- 18 – Passed – Murder: Special Circumstances. Legislative Initiative Amendment.
- 19 – Passed – Murder. BART and CSU Peace Officers. Legislative Initiative Amendment.
- 20 – Passed – California State Lottery. Allocation for Instructional Materials. Legislative Initiative Amendment.
- 21 – Passed – Juvenile Crime. Initiative Statute.
- 22 – Passed – Limit on Marriages. Initiative Statute.
- 23 – Failed – 'None of the Above' Ballot Option. Initiative Statute.
- 24 – Removed from ballot by order of the California Supreme Court. Proposed proposition concerned legislative pay and travel expenses, as well as a financial penalty to be assessed if lawmakers did not pass the annual budget in a timely manner. Deemed to violate the single subject clause of the California Constitution
- 25 – Failed – Election Campaigns. Contributions and Spending Limits. Public Financing. Disclosures. Initiative Statute.
- 26 – Failed – School Facilities. Local Majority Vote. Bonds, Taxes. Initiative Constitutional Amendment and Statute.
- 27 – Failed – Elections. Term Limit Declarations for Congressional Candidates. Initiative Statute.
- 28 – Failed – Repeal of Proposition 10 Tobacco Surtax. Initiative Statute.
- 29 – Passed – 1998 Indian Gaming Compacts. Referendum Statute.
- 30 – Failed – Insurance Claims Practices. Civil Remedies. Referendum.
- 31 – Failed – Insurance Claims Practices. Civil Remedy Amendments. Referendum.

=== November 7, 2000 ===
- 32 – Passed – Veterans' Bond Act of 2000. A.B. 2305.
- 33 – Failed – Legislature. Participation in Public Employees' Retirement System. A.C.A. 12.
- 34 – Passed – Campaign Contributions and Spending. Limits. Disclosure. S.B. 1223.
- 35 – Passed – Public Works Projects. Use of Private Contractors for Engineering and Architectural Services. Initiative.
- 36 – Passed – Drugs. Probation and Treatment Program. Initiative.
- 37 – Failed – Fees. Vote Requirements. Taxes. Initiative.
- 38 – Failed – School Vouchers. State-Funded Private and Religious Education. Public Schoolfunding. Initiative.
- 39 – Passed – School Facilities. 55% Local Vote. Bonds, Taxes. Accountability Requirements. Initiative.

=== March 5, 2002 ===
- 40 – Passed – The California Clean Water, Clean Air, Safe Neighborhood Parks, and Coastal Protection Act of 2002. AB 1602.
- 41 – Passed – Voting Modernization Bond Act of 2002. (Shelley-Hertzberg Act). AB 56.
- 42 – Passed – Transportation Congestion Improvement Act. Allocation of Existing Motor Vehicle Fuel Sales and Use Tax Revenues for Transportation Purposes Only. Legislative Constitutional Amendment. ACA 4.
- 43 – Passed – Right to Have Vote Counted. ACA 9.
- 44 – Failed – Chiropractors. Unprofessional Conduct. SB 1988.
- 45 – Failed – Legislative Term Limits. Local Voter Petitions. Initiative.

=== November 5, 2002 ===
- 46 – Passed – Housing and Emergency Shelter Trust Fund Act of 2002. S.B. 1227.
- 47 – Passed – Kindergarten-University Public Education Facilities Bond Act of 2002. A.B. 47.
- 48 – Passed – Court Consolidation. A.C.A. 15.
- 49 – Passed – Before and After School Programs. State Grants. Initiative.
- 50 – Passed – Water Quality, Supply and Safe Drinking Water Projects. Coastal Wetlands Purchase and Protection. Bonds. Initiative.
- 51 – Failed – Transportation. Distribution of Existing Motor Vehicle Sales and Use Tax. Initiative.
- 52 – Failed – Election Day Voter Registration. Voter Fraud Penalties. Initiative.

=== October 7, 2003 ===
- 53 – Failed – Funds Dedicated for State and Local Infrastructure. Legislative Constitutional Amendment. A.C.A. 11.
- 54 – Failed – Classification by Race, Ethnicity, Color, or National Origin. Initiative Constitutional Amendment.

=== March 2, 2004 ===
- 55 – Passed – Kindergarten-University Public Education Facilities Bond Act of 2004.
- 56 – Failed – State Budget, Related Taxes, and Reserve. Voting Requirements. Penalties. Initiative Constitutional Amendment and Statute.
- 57 – Passed – The Economic Recovery Bond Act.
- 58 – Passed – The California Balanced Budget Act.

=== November 2, 2004 ===
- 1A – Passed – Protection of Local Government Revenues.
- 59 – Passed – Public Records, Open Meetings. Legislative Constitutional Amendment.
- 60 – Passed – Election Rights of Political Parties. Legislative Constitutional Amendment.
- 60A – Passed – Surplus Property. Legislative Constitutional Amendment.
- 61 – Passed – Children's Hospital Projects. Grant Program. Bond Act. Initiative Statute.
- 62 – Failed – Elections. Primaries. Initiative Constitutional Amendment and Statute.
- 63 – Passed – Mental Health Services Expansion, Funding. Tax on Personal Incomes Above $1 Million. Initiative Statute.
- 64 – Passed – Limits on Private Enforcement of Unfair Business Competition Laws. Initiative Statute.
- 65 – Failed – Local Government Funds, Revenues. State Mandates. Initiative Constitutional Amendment.
- 66 – Failed – Limitations on "Three Strikes" Law. Sex Crimes. Punishment. Initiative Statute.
- 67 – Failed – Emergency Medical Services. Funding. Telephone Surcharge. Initiative Constitutional Amendment and Statute.
- 68 – Failed – Non-Tribal Commercial Gambling Expansion. Tribal Gaming Compact Amendments. Revenues, Tax Exemptions. Initiative Constitutional Amendments and Statute.
- 69 – Passed – DNA Samples. Collection. Database. Funding. Initiative Statute.
- 70 – Failed – Tribal Gaming Compacts. Exclusive Gaming Rights. Contributions to State. Initiative Constitutional Amendment and Statute.
- 71 – Passed – Stem Cell Research. Funding. Bonds. Initiative Constitutional Amendment and Statute.
- 72 – Failed – Health Care Coverage Requirements. Referendum.

=== November 8, 2005 ===
- 73 – Failed – Termination of Minor's Pregnancy. Waiting Period and Parental Notification. Initiative Constitutional Amendment.
- 74 – Failed – Public School Teachers. Waiting Period for Permanent Status. Dismissal. Initiative Statute.
- 75 – Failed – Public Employee Union Dues. Required Employee Consent for Political Contributions. Initiative Statute.
- 76 – Failed – School Funding. State Spending. Initiative Constitutional Amendment.
- 77 – Failed – Reapportionment. Initiative Constitutional Amendment.
- 78 – Failed – Prescription Drugs. Discounts. Initiative Statute.
- 79 – Failed – Prescription Drug Discounts. State-Negotiated Rebates. Initiative Statute.
- 80 – Failed – Electric Service Providers. Regulation. Initiative Statute.

=== June 6, 2006 ===
- 81 – Failed – California Reading and Literacy Improvement and Public Library Construction and Renovation Bond Act of 2006
- 82 – Failed – Public Preschool Education. Tax Increase on Incomes Over $400,000 for Individuals; $800,000 for Couples.

=== November 7, 2006 ===
- 1A – Passed – Protection of Transportation Funding
- 1B – Passed – Highway Safety, Traffic Reduction, Air Quality, and Port Security
- 1C – Passed – Housing and Emergency Shelter Trust Fund Act of 2006
- 1D – Passed – Kindergarten-University Public Education Facilities Bond Act of 2006
- 1E – Passed – Disaster Preparedness and Flood Prevention Act of 2006
- 83 – Passed – Comprehensive Registered Sex Offender Laws (popularly known as "Jessica's Law")
- 84 – Passed – Bonds for clean water, flood control, state and local park improvements, etc.
- 85 – Failed – Parental Notification before Termination of Teen's Pregnancy (second attempt at Proposition 73)
- 86 – Failed – Increase on Cigarette Tax
- 87 – Failed – Funding for alternative forms of energy
- 88 – Failed – Property Parcel Tax to fund for Education
- 89 – Failed – Campaign Finance Restrictions, including a corporate tax increase
- 90 – Failed – Eminent Domain and Environmental Law Enforcement Restrictions

=== February 5, 2008 ===
- 91 – Failed – Transportation money. Initiative Constitutional Amendment.
- 92 – Failed – Community Colleges. Funding. Governance. Fees. Initiative Constitutional Amendment and Statute.
- 93 – Failed – Limits on Legislators' Terms in Office. Initiative Constitutional Amendment.
- 94 – Passed – Referendum on Amendment to Indian Gaming Compact (Pechanga Band of Luiseño Mission Indians)
- 95 – Passed – Referendum on Amendment to Indian Gaming Compact (Morongo Band of Mission Indians)
- 96 – Passed – Referendum on Amendment to Indian Gaming Compact (Sycuan Band of the Kumeyaay Nation)
- 97 – Passed – Referendum on Amendment to Indian Gaming Compact (Agua Caliente Band of Cahuilla Indians)

=== June 3, 2008 ===
- 98 – Failed – Eminent Domain. Limits on Government Authority. Initiative Constitutional Amendment.
- 99 – Passed – Eminent Domain. Limits on Government Acquisition of Owner-Occupied Residence. Initiative Constitutional Amendment.

=== November 4, 2008 ===
- 1 – State Legislature amended proposition after a number was already designated; amended version became Proposition 1A.
- 1A – Passed – California High Speed Rail Bond. S.B. 1856.
- 2 – Passed – Treatment of Farm Animals. Statute.
- 3 – Passed – Children's Hospital Bond Act. Grant Program. Statute.
- 4 – Failed – Waiting Period and Parental Notification Before Termination of Minor's Pregnancy. Constitutional Amendment. (third attempt at Proposition 73)
- 5 – Failed – Nonviolent Offenders. Sentencing, Parole and Rehabilitation. Statute.
- 6 – Failed – Criminal Penalties and Laws. Public Safety Funding. Statute.
- 7 – Failed – Renewable Energy. Statute.
- 8 – Passed – Amends the California Constitution so that "Only marriage between a man and a woman is valid or recognized in California." Initiative Constitutional Amendment.
- 9 – Passed – Criminal Justice System. Victims' Rights. Parole. Constitutional Amendment and Statute.
- 10 – Failed – Alternative Fuel Vehicles and Renewable Energy. Statute.
- 11 – Passed – Redistricting. Constitutional Amendment and Statute.
- 12 – Passed – Veterans' Bond Act of 2008. S.B. 1572.

=== May 19, 2009 ===
- 1A – Failed – State finance.
- 1B – Failed – Education finance.
- 1C – Failed – California State Lottery.
- 1D – Failed – California Children and Families Act: use of funds: services for children.a
- 1E – Failed – The Mental Health Services Act: Proposition 63 amendments.
- 1F – Passed – State officer salary increases.
