= February 2008 San Francisco general election =

The February 2008 San Francisco general elections were held on February 5, 2008, in San Francisco, California. The elections included the United States presidential primaries, seven California ballot propositions, and three San Francisco ballot measures.

== Primaries ==
In the presidential primaries, San Francisco Democrats voted 51.98% in favor of candidate Barack Obama, versus 44.19% for Hillary Clinton.

San Francisco Republicans voted 52.46% in favor of John McCain, with 21.03% voting for Mitt Romney and 5.75% voting for Mike Huckabee.

== Propositions ==
Note: "City" refers to the San Francisco municipal government.

San Francisco voters rejected Proposition C, which would have turned Alcatraz Island into a "Global Peace Center".

They approved Proposition A, a $185 million bond measure to improve park and waterfront spaces. They also approved Proposition B, allowing retirement-age police officers to continue working while adding to their pension funds.

=== Proposition A ===

Proposition A would allow the city to issue bonds worth a total of $185 million to fund municipal park and recreation facilities and to raise property taxes to fund these bonds, permitting landlords to pass 50% of the increase to tenants. This proposition required a two-thirds majority to pass.

Proposition A
Choice	Votes	%
For	177,194	71.33
Against	71,232	28.67
Required majority		66.67
Total	248,426	100.00
Valid votes	248,426	92.28
Invalid/blank votes	20,784	7.72
Total votes	269,210	100.00
Registered voters/turnout		64.75

=== Proposition B ===

Proposition B would "allow certain retirement-eligible police officers to continue working for up to three additional years while accumulating their regular retirement benefits in tax-deferred retirement accounts."

Proposition B
Choice	Votes	%
For	158,883	64.72
Against	86,613	35.28
Total	245,496	100.00
Valid votes	245,496	91.19
Invalid/blank votes	23,713	8.81
Total votes	269,209	100.00
Registered voters/turnout		64.75

=== Proposition C ===

Proposition C would make it City policy to transform Alcatraz Island into a Global Peace Center.

Proposition C
Choice	Votes	%
For	69,251	28.09
Against	177,301	71.91
Total	246,552	100.00
Valid votes	246,552	91.51
Invalid/blank votes	22,868	8.49
Total votes	269,420	100.00
Registered voters/turnout		64.75

== See also ==
- California state elections, February 2008
- California Democratic primary, 2008
- California Republican primary, 2008
