= California Proposition 60 =

California Proposition 60 may refer to:

- California Proposition 60 (1986)
- California Proposition 60 (2004)
- California Proposition 60 (2016)

== See also ==
- California Proposition 60A (2004)
