= California Proposition 1A =

There are three different ballot propositions in California called Proposition 1A:

- California Proposition 1A (2004), about protecting local funding being repurposed for state usage.
- California Proposition 1A (2008), about funding for high-speed rail in California.
- California Proposition 1A (2009), about state finances.
