= California Proposition 52 =

California Proposition 52 may refer to:

- California Proposition 52 (2002)
- California Proposition 52 (2016)
