= California Proposition 54 =

California Proposition 54 may refer to:

- 2003 California Proposition 54, about Classification by Race, Ethnicity, Color, or National Origin
- 2016 California Proposition 54, about videos of public meetings of the State Legislature
