= California Proposition 62 =

California Proposition 62 may refer to:

- California Proposition 62 (2004)
- California Proposition 62 (2016)
