= California Proposition 65 =

California Proposition 65 may refer to:

- California Proposition 65 (1986) (passed) The Safe Drinking Water and Toxic Enforcement Act of 1986. Requires public notice of products containing dangerous or carcinogenic chemicals.
- California Proposition 65 (2004) (failed) would have protected local jurisdiction revenues from state government encroachment.
- California Proposition 65 (2016) (failed) would have mandated sale of carryout (reusable tote) bags.
