= California Proposition 47 =

California Proposition 47 may refer to either of the following ballot initiatives in California:

- California Proposition 47 (2002) measure providing for the sale of $13 billion in bonds for education.
- California Proposition 47 (2014) measure reducing the criminal penalties on many nonviolent drug and property crimes from felonies to misdemeanors.
