= 2008 California Democratic presidential primary =

- February 5, 2008

441 delegates to the Democratic National Convention (204 pledged, 71 unpledged) The number of pledged delegates received is determined by the popular vote

Candidate	Hillary Clinton	Barack Obama
Home state	New York	Illinois
Delegate count	204	166
Popular vote	2,608,184	2,186,662
Percentage	51.47%	43.16%
- Primary results by county Clinton: 40–50% 50–60% 60–70% Obama: 40–50% 50–60%

The 2008 California Democratic presidential primary took place on February 5, 2008, also known as Super Tuesday. California offered the most delegates out of any nominating contest. Hillary Clinton won the primary with 51.47% of the vote, winning 204 delegates, while Barack Obama got 43.16% of the vote and won 166 delegates.

== Process ==
In the primary, 370 of California's 441 delegates to the Democratic National Convention were selected. Of these delegates, 241 were awarded at the congressional district level, and the remaining 129 were allocated to candidates based on the primary vote statewide. The remaining delegates were superdelegates not obligated to vote for any candidate at the convention. Candidates were required to receive at least 15% of either the district or statewide vote to receive any delegates. Registered Democrats and Decline to State voters were eligible to vote.

Number of delegates	Congressional districts
3	20, 47
4	2, 3, 11, 16, 18, 19, 21, 22, 25, 26, 31, 32, 34, 38, 39, 40, 41, 42, 43, 44, 45, 46, 48, 49, 51, 52
5	1, 4, 5, 7, 10, 13, 15, 17, 23, 24, 27, 28, 29, 33, 35, 36, 37, 50, 53
6	6, 8, 9, 12, 14, 30

== Polls ==
The latest six polls were averaged (only counting the latest Zogby poll).

Candidate	Mean of polls released in February 2008	Median of polls released in February 2008	RCP average
Hillary Clinton	42.8%	40.5%	44.2%
Barack Obama	40.3%	40.4%	41.6%

== Results ==
Key:	Withdrew prior to contest

California Democratic presidential primary, 2008
Candidate	Votes	Percentage	National delegates
Hillary Clinton	2,608,184	51.47%	204
Barack Obama	2,186,662	43.16%	166
John Edwards	193,617	3.82%	0
Dennis Kucinich	24,126	0.48%	0
Bill Richardson	19,939	0.39%	0
Joe Biden	18,261	0.36%	0
Mike Gravel	8,184	0.16%	0
Christopher Dodd	8,005	0.16%	0
Willie Carter (write-in)	4	0.00%	0
Eric Hinzman (write-in)	4	0.00%	0
Phil Epstein (write-in)	3	0.00%	0
Brian Calef (write-in)	2	0.00%	0
David Frey (write-in)	1	0.00%	0
Joseph McAndrew (write-in)	1	0.00%	0
Keith Judd (write-in)	0	0.00%	0
Julius Mogyorossy (write-in)	0	0.00%	0
Totals	5,066,993	100.00%	370
Voter turnout^{[A]}	—		—

== Notes ==
^{A} Turnout information is not available because Decline to State voters were allowed to participate. There were a total of 6,749,406 eligible registered voters registered with the Democratic Party and 3,043,164 who declined to state.

== See also ==
- 2008 California Republican presidential primary
- February 2008 California elections
- 2008 Democratic Party presidential primaries
- 2008 United States presidential election in California
