= California Proposition 61 =

California Proposition 61 may refer to:

- California Proposition 61 (2004)
- California Proposition 61 (2016)
