= California Proposition 3 =

California Proposition 3 could refer to

- 2008 California Proposition 3
- 2024 California Proposition 3
