= California Proposition 10 =

California Proposition 10 may refer to:

- California Proposition 10 (1998)
- California Proposition 10 (2008)
