= Proposition 48 =

Proposition 48 may refer to:

- Proposition 48 (NCAA), proposition for the (USA) National Collegiate Athletics Association
- California Proposition 48 (2002), Californian ballot proposition
