= California Proposition 6 =

California Proposition 6 may refer to:

- Briggs Initiative Prop 6 (1978): REJECTED; Proposed ban of gays and lesbians from working in California public schools.
- California Proposition 6 (1998): PASSED; Felony to kill a horse, donkey or mule for human consumption.
- California Proposition 6 (2008): REJECTED; Safe Neighborhoods Act and The Runner Initiative.
- California Proposition 6 (2018): REJECTED; November 2018 Repeal of the Road Repair and Accountability Act
- 2024 California Proposition 6: PENDING; November 2024: Repeal the line in the state constitution saying, "Involuntary servitude is prohibited except to punish crime", replacing it with language saying that involuntary servitude is prohibited absolutely.
