= 2008 California Proposition 3 =

Proposition 3, the Children's Hospital Bond Act of 2008, is a law that was enacted by California voters by means of the initiative process. It is a bond issue that authorizes $980 million in bonds, to be repaid from state's General Fund, to fund the construction, expansion, remodeling, renovation, furnishing and equipping of children's hospitals. The annual payment on the debt authorized by the initiative is approximately $64 million a year. Altogether, the measure would cost about $1.9 billion over 30 years out of California's general fund.

The initiative was presented to the Attorney-General's office in July 2007 and the measure was put to a vote as part of the 4 November 2008 state elections. It now forms Part 6.1 of the Health and Safety Code.

A smaller, but similar, bond measure for hospitals, Proposition 61, was approved by voters in 2004, totalling $750 million. As of June 1, 2008, about $403 million (just over half the total sum) had been spent.

== Campaign ==
=== Estimate of fiscal impact ===
The Legislative Analyst estimated that the proposed law would cost about $2 billion over thirty years to pay off both the principal ($980 million) and the interest ($933 million) costs of the bonds. Payments of about $64 million per year would be required.

=== Supporters ===
The official committee supporting the initiative was called the California Children's Hospital Association Initiative Fund. The campaign to enact the measure was largely supported by hospitals—all donors to the campaign of over $5,000 were such institutions. It was argued that passing the initiative would help provide the hospitals with enough money for greater bed capacity and to purchase important equipment as well as the most modern technologies. The Los Angeles Times editorialized in favor. Arno Political Consultants was paid about $1,028,000 to conduct the petition drive that qualified the measure for the ballot.

=== Opponents ===
The National Tax Limitation Committee, chaired by Lew Uhler, was the official committee opposed to the measure. The Appeal-Democrat and the Pasadena Star News editorialized against the measure. Against the measure it was argued that

- Proposition 3 would be a misuse of the public ballot system by special interests
- The measure would allow money to go to hospitals that were not children's hospitals.
- The same special interest groups as supported Proposition 3 had supported the passage of the similar Proposition 61, and half of that money remained unspent.

=== Polling ===
Month of Poll	Polling company	In Favor	Opposed	Undecided
September 2008	Field	47 percent	35 percent	18 percent

A Field Poll taken in mid-September found that only 18% of 830 likely voters surveyed across the state had heard of Proposition 3 prior to being told of it by the survey interviewer.

== Result of vote ==
Election results by county.

Proposition 3
Choice	Votes	%
For	6,984,319	55.26
Against	5,654,586	44.74
Total	12,638,905	100.00
Valid votes	12,638,905	91.96
Invalid/blank votes	1,104,272	8.04
Total votes	13,743,177	100.00
Registered voters/turnout		79.42

== See also ==
- California Health and Safety Code
