= T. Boone Pickens =

American financier (1928–2019)

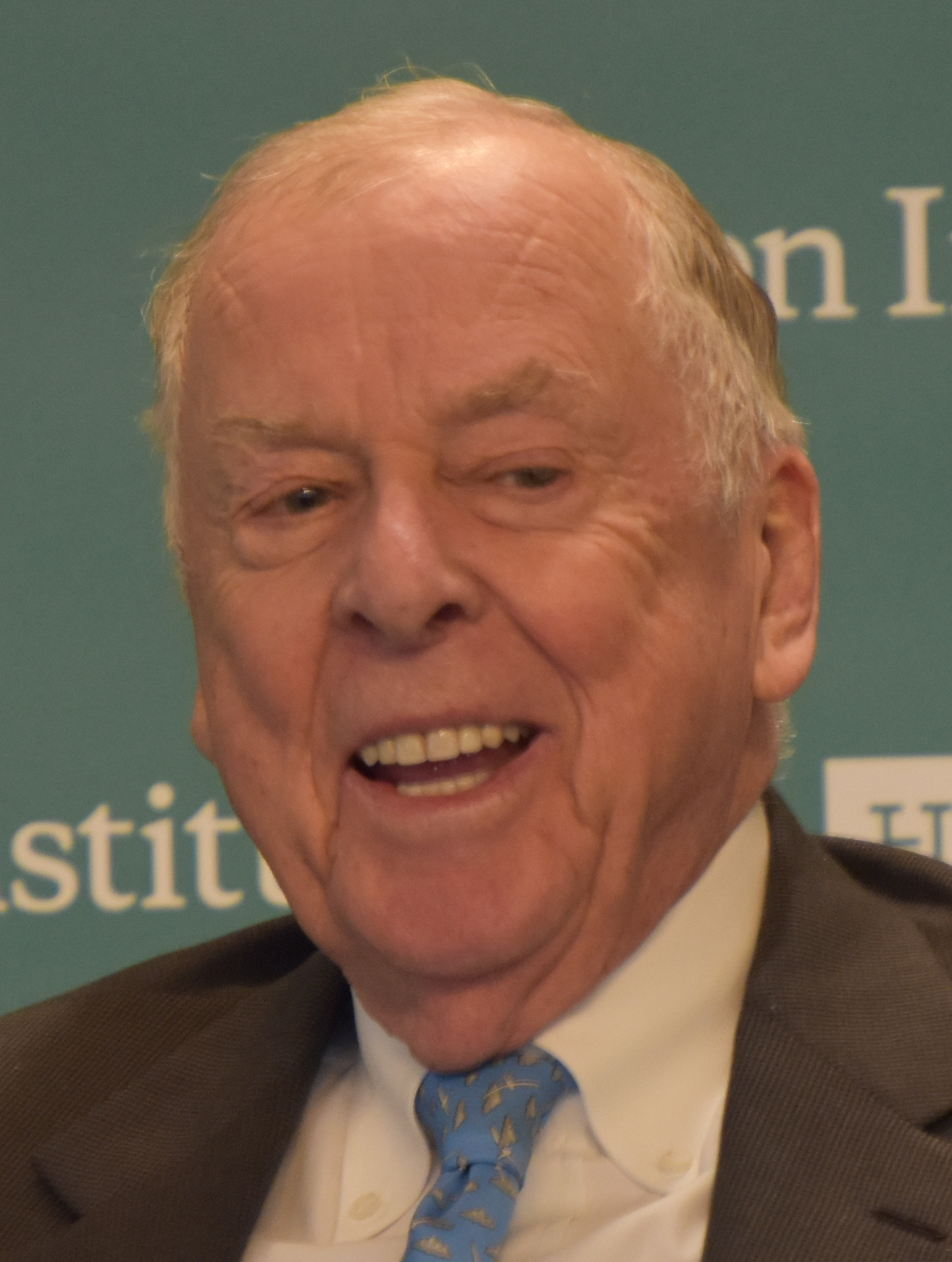
- Pickens in 2016
- Born: Thomas Boone Pickens Jr. May 22, 1928; Holdenville, Oklahoma, U.S.
- Died: September 11, 2019 (aged 91); Dallas, Texas, U.S.
- Education: Oklahoma State University (BS)
- Occupation: Chairman of BP Capital Management
- Spouses: Lynn O'Brien (m. 1949; div. 1971); Beatrice Carr (m. 1972; div. 1998); Nelda Cain (m. 2000; div. 2004); Madeleine Paulson (m. 2005; div. 2012); Toni Brinker (m. 2014; div. 2017)
- Children: 5
- Website: www.boonepickens.com

Thomas Boone Pickens Jr. (May 22, 1928 – September 11, 2019) was an American business magnate and financier. Pickens chaired the hedge fund BP Capital Management. He was a well-known takeover operator and corporate raider during the 1980s. Later in life, he was a prominent conservative activist and philanthropist. At the time of Pickens' death in 2019, his net worth stood at $500 million, after he had given away more than $1 billion to various philanthropic causes.

== Early life ==
Pickens was born in Holdenville, Oklahoma, the son of Grace Marcaline (née Molonson), and Thomas Boone Sibley Pickens. His father worked as an oil and mineral landman (rights leaser). During World War II, his mother ran the local Office of Price Administration, rationing gasoline and other goods in three counties. Pickens was the first child born via Caesarean section in the history of Holdenville hospital. His great-great-grandfather was politician Ezekiel Pickens, who was Lieutenant Governor of South Carolina.

At age 12, Pickens delivered newspapers. He quickly expanded his paper route from 28 papers to 156. Pickens later cited his boyhood job as an early introduction to "expanding quickly by acquisition", a business practice he favored later in life.

When the oil boom in Oklahoma ended in the late 1930s, Pickens' family moved to Amarillo, Texas. Pickens attended Texas A&M on a basketball scholarship, but was cut from the team and lost the scholarship and transferred to Oklahoma A&M (now Oklahoma State University), where he majored in geology. He was a member of the Sigma Alpha Epsilon fraternity. He graduated from Oklahoma A&M with a degree in geology in 1951. Following his graduation, Pickens was employed by Phillips Petroleum. He worked for Phillips until 1954. In 1956, following his period as a wildcatter, he founded the company that would later become Mesa Petroleum.

== Career ==
By 1981, Mesa had grown into one of the largest independent oil companies in the world. Pickens led Mesa's first major acquisition, a takeover of the Hugoton Production Company, which was 30 times the size of Mesa. He then shifted his focus to acquiring other oil and gas companies by making solicited and unsolicited buyout bids and other merger and acquisition activity. Pickens' corporate acquisitions made him well known during the 1980s, an era of extensive takeover activity. His most publicized deals included attempted buyouts of Cities Service, Gulf Oil, Phillips Petroleum and Unocal. During that period Pickens led two Mesa successful acquisitions of Pioneer Petroleum and the mid-continent assets of Tenneco.

Time magazine put him on the cover for the March 1985 issue when Mesa took over Gulf Oil. He considered running for president in the 1988 elections. During this period, he was characterized as a corporate raider and greenmailer. This is due to the fact that many of his deals were not completed, although Pickens and the shareholders he represented received substantial profits through the eventual sale of their stock as a result. His later takeover targets included Newmont, a New York-based firm, Diamond Shamrock, and Koito Manufacturing, a Japanese auto-parts manufacturer, making substantial gains in the process. He was also involved in the creation of the United Shareholders Association (USA), which from 1986 to 1993 attempted to influence the governance of several large companies. After nearly two years of periodic hearing and debate, in July 1998 the Securities and Exchange Commission voted 4–1 to approve a one-share, one-vote rule, a primary USA objective.

Pickens chaired the Board of Regents of West Texas State University (now West Texas A&M University) in Canyon. He organized a campaign in the mid-1980s against the Amarillo Globe-News newspaper, for what he claimed was inaccurate reporting about his deals and Mesa. Pickens' attempts to have the paper change its editorial policy failed. Shortly thereafter, in 1989, Pickens and Mesa moved to a suburb of Dallas. In 1996, Mesa was in deep financial trouble and was sold to financier Richard Rainwater. Darla Moore, Rainwater's wife, had Pickens removed from the company. Mesa merged with Parker & Parsley Petroleum in 1997 to form Pioneer Natural Resources.

In 1997, Pickens founded BP Capital Management (then called BP Energy Fund) – the initials standing for "Boone Pickens" and not related to BP. In 2006, Pickens earned $990 million from his equity in the two funds and $120 million from his share of the 20% fees applied to fund profits. In 2007, Pickens earned $2.7 billion, as BP Capital Equity Fund, grew by 24% after fees, and the then $590 million Capital Commodity fund grew 40%, thanks to, among others, large positions in the stocks of Suncor Energy, ExxonMobil and Occidental Petroleum. Once his health started declining, he closed the company in 2018.

In 2009, Pickens' received The Franklin Institute "Bower" Award for Business Leadership for 50 years of visionary leadership in oil and other types of energy production, including domestic renewable energy, and for his philanthropic leadership contributing to education, medical research, and wildlife conservation.

=== Natural gas ===
In his 2008 book, The First Billion Is the Hardest, Pickens noted a belief in the peak oil theory. He later altered that position, noting technical achievements of the domestic oil and natural gas industries in using horizontal drilling and fracking to unlock shale oil and gas reserves. He called for the construction of more nuclear power plants, the use of natural gas to power the country's transportation systems, and the promotion of alternative energy. Pickens's involvement with the natural gas fueling campaign was long-running. He formed Pickens Fuel Corporation in 1997 and began promoting natural gas as the best vehicular fuel alternative. Reincorporated as Clean Energy Fuels Corporation in 2001, the company now owns and operates natural gas fueling stations from British Columbia to the Mexico–U.S. border.

== Political activity ==
Since 1980, Pickens has made over $5 million in political donations. He was a financial supporter of President George W. Bush and contributed heavily to both his Texas and national political campaigns. In 2004, Pickens contributed to Republican 527 groups, including a $2 million contribution to the Swift Vets and POWs for Truth which ran a campaign asserting that Bush's rival, John Kerry, exaggerated claims about his service in Vietnam, and $2.5 million to the Progress for America advocacy group. In 2005, Pickens was among 53 entities that contributed the maximum of $250,000 to Bush's second inauguration.

On July 16, 2007, Pickens wrote an article for National Review supporting Rudy Giuliani for president.

In Rudy Giuliani, a gracious and committed public servant I've known for many years, we see that rare blend of big-picture vision and proven track record of achieving the 'impossible.' We see a forward-looking, accomplished executive eager to tackle the challenges of today's America and ensure that tomorrow we wake up stronger, freer, and more united than ever before.

Pickens was an executive committee member of the Rudy Giuliani presidential committee.

Pickens promoted solar energy and wind energy as important sources alongside oil.

In the spring of 2010, Kerry contacted Pickens and encouraged his support of energy/climate change legislation he was drafting with Senators Joe Lieberman and Lindsey Graham. During a May 2010 meeting with reporters, Kerry endorsed key provisions of "the Pickens Plan," incorporating aspects of that in the Kerry-backed legislation calling for the greater use of domestic natural gas to replace foreign oil‑diesel‑gasoline in America's heavy‑duty vehicle fleets.

=== Swift Boat challenge ===
On November 6, 2007, Pickens offered a million dollars to anyone able to dispute any claims made in political ads by the Swift Vets and POWs for Truth (SVPT), a group he had supported during the 2004 presidential election. John Kerry, whose military record and antiwar activism during Vietnam was the target of the group's book and media campaign, sent Pickens a letter on November 16, 2007, accepting the challenge, requesting that Pickens donate the money to the Paralyzed Veterans of America should he succeed in disproving any of the SVPT claims. In response to Kerry's acceptance of the challenge, Pickens issued a letter the same day, narrowing the original challenge to the SVPT ads, and requiring Kerry to provide his Vietnam journal, all of his military records, specifically those covering the years after his active-duty service, and copies of all movies and tapes made during his service. Pickens' letter also challenged Kerry to agree to donate $1 million to the Congressional Medal of Honor Foundation, if Kerry could not refute the Swift Boat ads. Kerry later accused Pickens of going back on his initial offer and stated he would refute the ads if Pickens could hold up his end of the bargain.

On June 22, 2008, a group of Vietnam veterans who previously served with and then worked with Kerry accepted the challenge and sent a 12-page letter, with a 42-page attachment of military records to support their case, to rebut several of the accusations of the Swift Boat group. Pickens rejected the group's claim that the material refuted the specific content in the ads.

=== Lobbying efforts to stop horse slaughter ===
Pickens lobbied for the American Horse Slaughter Prevention Act (HR 503) which would prohibit the slaughter for human consumption and the trade and transport of horse flesh and live horses intended for human consumption.

=== Attempt to sell natural gas with a California ballot initiative ===
In November 2008, California voters rejected a referendum by a 60% to 40% margin regarding natural gas. Pickens owned Clean Energy Fuels Corporation, a natural gas fueling station company which was the primary backer of the November 2008 Proposition 10 on California's ballot. Much of the measure's sale of $5 billion in general fund bonds to provide alternative energy rebates and incentives ($9.8 billion after interest) would have benefitted Pickens' company to the exclusion of almost all other clean-vehicle fuels and technology.

== Philanthropy ==
Pickens gave more than $700 million away to charity, of which nearly $500 million were donated to Oklahoma State University. Pickens was among the billionaires who have made The Giving Pledge, a commitment to give away half of his wealth for charitable purposes.

=== Donations to Oklahoma State University ===
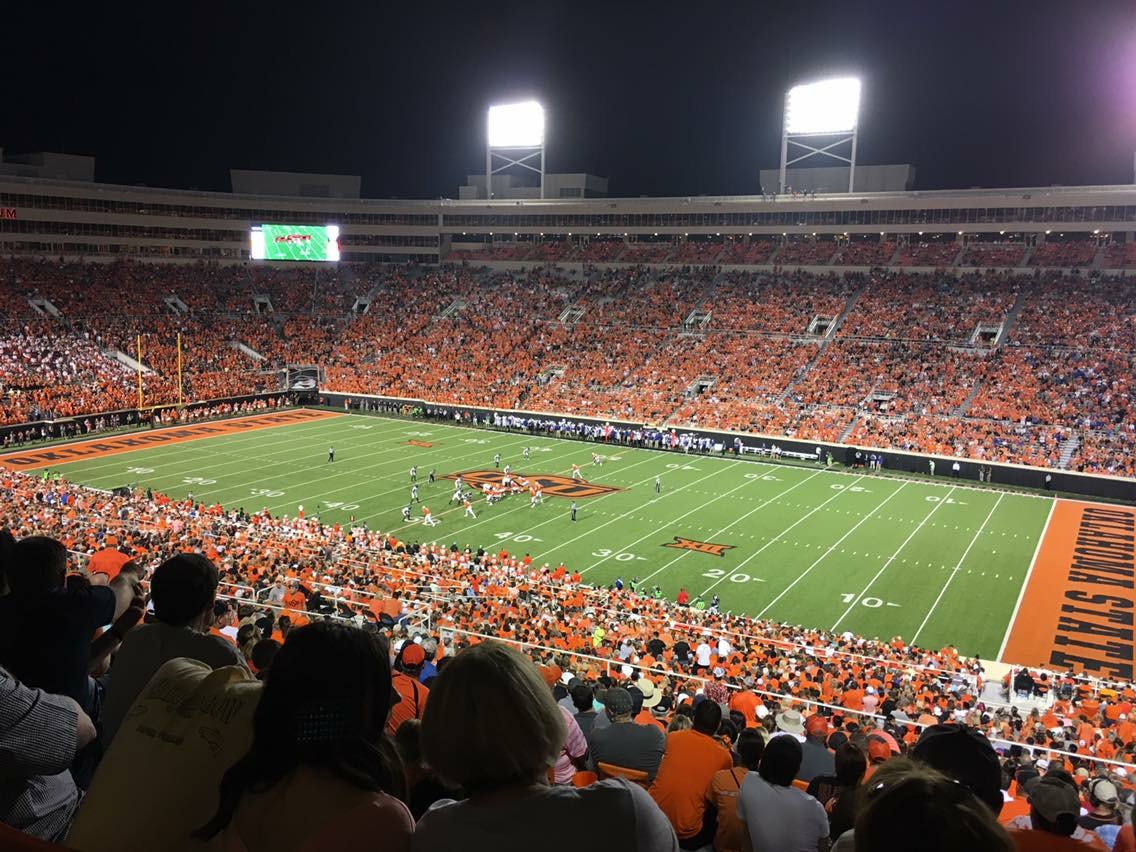
Boone Pickens Stadium at Oklahoma State University in Stillwater, Oklahoma

Pickens was a major financial contributor to his alma mater, the Stillwater campus of Oklahoma State University (OSU). Through his contributions, Pickens spearheaded an initiative to create an athletic village just north of the existing campus. In order to do so, hundreds of houses were acquired by the OSU administration, one via eminent domain, and demolished using Pickens' contributions.

Pickens' gift remains the largest donation to a university's athletic program in collegiate history. His total contributions to OSU came to over $1 billion. Over $265 million, or 26.5%, of his donations were towards athletics. Pickens also made substantial academic gifts to Oklahoma State University, including a $1 million donation to help construct the Boone Pickens School of Geology, which is named for him.

On December 30, 2005, Pickens made a $165 million gift to Oklahoma State University. It was immediately invested in BP Capital Management a hedge fund controlled by Pickens. Pickens, who was on the board of the O.S.U. Cowboy Golf waived any management fees for the OSU monies. All profits of the fund go to enlarging the OSU gift. The gift is intended to help fund an upgrade of the football stadium and construction of an athletic village but sparked controversy because OSU planned to use eminent domain to acquire residential property for the projects. The donation followed a $70 million gift from Pickens to OSU in 2003, which was similarly structured using O.S.U. Cowboy Golf, Inc.

On July 28, 2007, the Board of Regents of Oklahoma State University approved a resolution to move $28 million from the OSU Foundation into Pickens' BP Capital Management company in Dallas. Oklahoma State had previously invested $277 million in the fund. Pickens waived fees for the university's investments with his fund.

On May 21, 2008, Pickens donated $100 million to academics at Oklahoma State University. The gift was to be matched by the state of Oklahoma.

=== Humanitarian contributions ===
Pickens and employees of his BP Capital LLC donated $7 million to the Hurricane Katrina relief effort. The Chronicle of Philanthropy lists Pickens as among its largest charitable givers 2005 and 2006. He has donated nearly a half a billion dollars to philanthropic causes during his career. In 2005 in the wake of Hurricane Katrina, Pickens together with his then-wife Madeleine, chartered airplanes to transport dogs rescued from the floodwaters in New Orleans. On November 6, 2006, Pickens donated $5 million toward the construction of Texas Woman's University's T. Boone Pickens Institute of Health Sciences-Dallas Center.

On May 16, 2007, Pickens donated $100 million to two University of Texas health care institutions. The gifts were donated to the UT Southwestern Medical Center at Dallas and the University of Texas M. D. Anderson Cancer Center in Houston. The donations are required to grow to $1 billion within 25 years before they can be disbursed by the recipient institutions. In 2007, Pickens donated $3.5 million to Happy Hill Farm Academy, a residential school for at-risk children and teenagers, to build a training center and guest lodge. Pickens donated $6 million to Jubilee Park in Dallas for reconstruction.

On June 20, 2008, Pickens donated $25 million to the University of Calgary's Faculty of Medicine during a visit with Calgary Flames owner Harley Hotchkiss. On October 21, 2008, Pickens donated $5 million to the Downtown Dallas YMCA. The Downtown YMCA was subsequently renamed the "T. Boone Pickens YMCA" in his honor. "I want this gift to encourage individuals, corporations and the entire city to make a serious commitment to fitness and health," Boone Pickens said. "This money isn't just helping people work out – it will revitalize this area and make the YMCA a place for the citizens of Dallas today, and will inspire our next generation to be healthy." In December 2008, the Texas Legislative Conference honored Pickens as its "Texan of the Year."

In 2010, Pickens was awarded the annual, "Effecting Change" award by 100 Women in Hedge Funds. Pickens also donated over $11 million to the University of Texas at Dallas Center for Brain Health to fund educational and research initiatives in the area of brain science. Part of the donation is funding the "T. Boone Pickens Distinguished Scientist" chair that is held by Dr. Ian Robertson, PhD.

=== Awards and honors ===
In 1984, Pickens received the Golden Plate Award of the American Academy of Achievement. In 2003, Pickens was inducted into the Oklahoma Hall of Fame. In May 2012, Pickens was awarded the Albert Schweitzer Leadership Award by the Hugh O'Brian Youth Leadership Foundation for his lifetime of accomplishments and in particular for the example that he has set for the future leaders of the world.

== Alternative energy ==
On September 19, 2007, Pickens told CNBC that the price of oil could rise to $100 per barrel. His company was betting on natural gas for vehicles. On January 2, 2008, the first contract for $100 bbl oil was sold on the NYMEX exchange. As of November 21, 2008, the price of oil had fallen below $50 a barrel as part of the 2008 financial crisis.

=== Wind power ===
On August 16, 2007, Pickens' Mesa Power announced that it had filed documents with the state of Texas to add four gigawatts of electricity to the state grid. The filing with the Electric Reliability Council of Texas (ERCOT) projected that the project would be completed in 2011 and would include up to 2,700 turbines on up to 200,000 acres (810 km^{2}) in Roberts and adjacent counties in the Texas Panhandle. "We are now meeting with Panhandle landowners and negotiating wind lease and easement agreements," said Pickens. "We are excited at how quickly the pieces are falling into place."

On January 30, 2008, The Oklahoman reported that Pickens was ready to start buying wind turbines for the project within a month, that he planned to buy between 1,700 and 2,000 turbines, and that they will cost from $200 million to $300 million. Pickens added that he has been approached by twenty potential partners on the project but has not yet made a final decision. "We have not picked any banker and we have not picked any partner," Pickens said. "It is kind of nice ... I have decided I can get pretty far down the track before having to make those choices." Pickens predicted that similar wind farm projects could be built in the Texas Panhandle and the Canada–US border in the future.

On May 15, 2008, Pickens' Mesa Power announced that it had placed a first order for 667 1.5-megawatt turbines from General Electric. The turbines will be delivered in 2010 and 2011. On July 17, 2008, the Texas Public Utilities Commission approved ratepayer funding of $4.98 billion in electric transmission lines to connect wind farms in the Texas Panhandle to the electric grid. This implements the provisions of a 2005 Texas law designed to promote new wind energy projects.

On July 8, 2009, The Wall Street Journal reported that Pickens postponed plans to build his Texas wind farm. He said the project was stopped partly because the existing transmission line capacity wasn't available. His company had planned to build new lines, but couldn't get financing. On the same date, The New York Times, reported that Pickens was committed to purchasing 667 wind turbines and would develop wind projects for them. On his Mesa Power Group website, Pickens said he expected to continue the development of the Pampa project, but not at the pace originally expected.

On December 15, 2010, Nathanael Baker, in an article for www.theenergycollective.com, wrote that Pickens has scrapped plans for wind farms and will instead focus exclusively on natural gas. According to the article, on December 10, 2010, MSNBC reported that "Pickens said low natural gas prices have made utility companies view wind power as too expensive."

=== The Pickens Plan ===
On July 8, 2008, Pickens announced a major energy policy proposal, called the Pickens Plan. The plan promotes a radical reduction in the United States' dependency upon foreign energy, particularly oil provided by nations in the OPEC cartel. Although the plan calls for the introduction of various alternatives to oil, including wind and solar, its major component is the conversion of the nation's commercial transport sector away from OPEC diesel to natural gas. The Pickens Plan also calls for the United States to utilize its wind corridor in the middle of the country stretching from Texas northerly through the Great Plains to the Canada–US border. He noted in Congressional testimony in July 2008 that his plan would generate new jobs and provide economic stimulus to this area while noting that it would also require new transmission lines which traditionally antagonize some environmentalists and/or nearby populations. The announcement of the plan also coincided with Pickens' need for federal subsidies for the wind to be renewed, as he had already begun placing orders for his planned wind farm in Texas.

Pickens wanted to spend $58 million on his multi-media effort to promote the Pickens Plan. The multi-media campaign included traditional media, such as newspaper and TV, and new media, such as YouTube and Facebook. The television ads for the Pickens Plan were produced by veteran Democratic political consultant, Joe Slade White. Carl Pope, executive director of the Sierra Club, expressed support for the Pickens Plan. Pickens' proposal for increased use of natural gas in heavy-duty trucks and fleet vehicles is included in the NAT GAS Act (H.R. 1835 and S. 1408) and the American Power Act.

On February 21, 2013, Pickens spoke on behalf of Clean Energy Fuels along with New York City Mayor Michael Bloomberg in support of a new eco-friendly food truck. A press conference took place in front of the city hall where the company, Neapolitan Express, explained how their mobile pizzeria emits 75% fewer greenhouse gases than trucks running on gas or diesel. The company launched in early 2013.

== Personal life and death ==
In 1949, Pickens married Lynn O'Brien. They had four children together; Deborah Pickens, Michael O. Pickens, Thomas B. Pickens III, and Pam Pickens. Pickens divorced Lynn in 1971. In April 1972, Pickens married Beatrice "Bea" Carr Stuart and adopted one of her daughters, Elizabeth "Liz" Cordia. They had no children together. In November 2000, Pickens married Nelda Cain. They divorced in November 2004. They had no children together. In 2005, Pickens married Madeleine Paulson, the third wife and widow of the founder of Gulfstream Aerospace, Allen E. Paulson. Pickens and Madeleine lived in Preston Hollow, Dallas, and owned a ranch along the Canadian River in the Texas Panhandle. They divorced amicably in 2012 and had no children together. On December 4, 2013, Pickens' public relations representative told an NBC 5 affiliate reporter that he had proposed to Toni Chapman Brinker, widow of restaurateur Norman Brinker, at his ranch in Pampa. The couple married on February 14, 2014. The couple later divorced in June 2017.

Pickens had four biological children and one adopted daughter. As of 2007, Pickens had 12 grandchildren. In January 2013, Pickens' 21-year-old grandson Thomas "Ty" Boone Pickens IV died from a heroin overdose. Ty, the son of Thomas B. Pickens III, was a student at Texas Christian University in Fort Worth, Texas.

In July 2009, Pickens was the subject of controversy after he had a construction crew go to his grandmother's former home, that was owned by someone else at the time, in Holdenville, Oklahoma, and remove a slab of driveway concrete that he had signed as a child. The current owner of the home asserted ownership, and in February 2010, a judge ruled that the slab belonged to the current homeowner, so the slab was returned.

Pickens died at his home in Dallas on September 11, 2019. He was in declining health and suffered a series of strokes and a fall in 2017, but the cause of death was not disclosed at the time of his death.

On September 18, 2019, his foundation published "A final message from T. Boone Pickens" shared before his death, a personal reflection about his life, lessons learned, and his mortality.

== Books ==
- Pickens, T. Boone, The First Billion Is the Hardest: Reflections on a Life of Comebacks and America's Energy Future, 2008, ISBN 0-307-39577-4.
- Pickens, Boone, The Luckiest Guy in the World, 2001, ISBN 1-58798-019-3.
- Pickens, Boone, Boone, 1987, ISBN 0-395-47811-1.
