= 2008 California Propositions 94, 95, 96, and 97 =

Propositions 94, 95, 96, and 97 were Californian ballot propositions that sought to expand the scope of Native American gambling enterprises in California. All four propositions were approved by voters during elections on February 5, 2008

== Proposals ==
All propositions sought to expand Indian Gaming Compacts with individual tribes. Proposition 94 affected the Pechanga Band of Luiseño Mission Indians, Proposition 95 affected the Morongo Band of Mission Indians, Proposition 96 affected the Sycuan Band of the Kumeyaay Nation, Proposition 97 affected the Agua Caliente Band of Cahuilla Indians.

All the propositions allowed the tribes to operate additional slot machines and changed the environmental impact assessment procedures. The propositions also made the tribes pay additional deposits into the state General Fund.

== Results ==

Proposition 94
Choice	Votes	%
For	4,812,313	55.56
Against	3,848,998	44.44
Total	8,661,311	100.00
Valid votes	8,661,311	95.51
Invalid/blank votes	407,104	4.49
Total votes	9,068,415	100.00
Registered voters/turnout		57.71

Proposition 95
Choice	Votes	%
For	4,809,573	55.60
Against	3,841,352	44.40
Total	8,650,925	100.00
Valid votes	8,650,925	95.40
Invalid/blank votes	417,490	4.60
Total votes	9,068,415	100.00
Registered voters/turnout		57.71

Proposition 96
Choice	Votes	%
For	4,785,413	55.45
Against	3,844,408	44.55
Total	8,629,821	100.00
Valid votes	8,629,821	95.16
Invalid/blank votes	438,594	4.84
Total votes	9,068,415	100.00

Proposition 97
Choice	Votes	%
For	4,786,884	55.50
Against	3,838,892	44.50
Total	8,625,776	100.00
Valid votes	8,625,776	95.12
Invalid/blank votes	442,639	4.88
Total votes	9,068,415	100.00
Registered voters/turnout		57.71
