= 2012 California Republican presidential primary =

- June 5, 2012

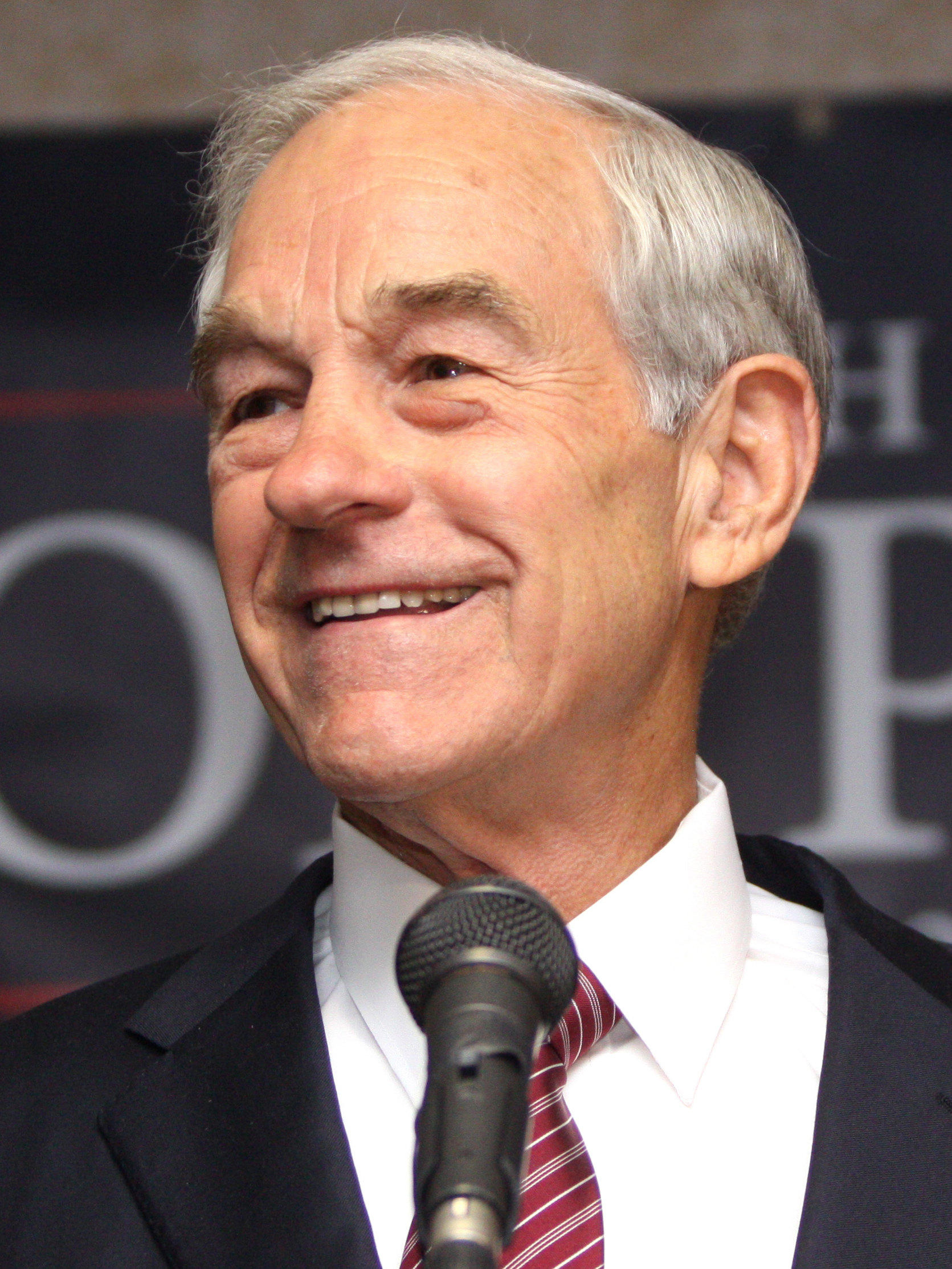

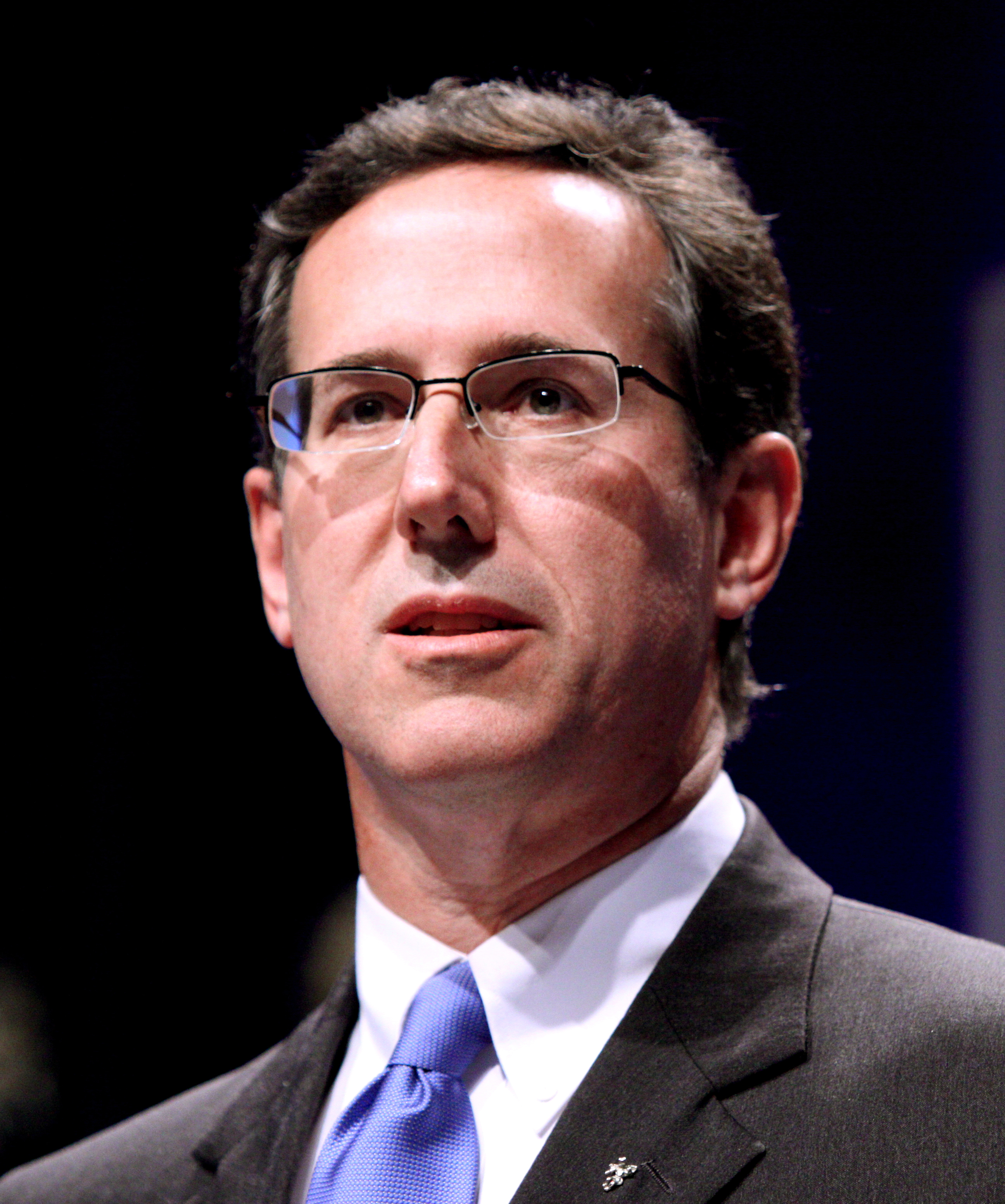
Candidate	Mitt Romney	Ron Paul	Rick Santorum
Home state	Massachusetts	Texas	Pennsylvania
Delegate count	171	0	0
Popular vote	1,530,513	199,246	102,258
Percentage	79.51%	10.35%	5.31%
- California results by county Mitt Romney (Note: Italicization indicates a withdrawn candidacy)

The 2012 California Republican presidential primary was held on June 5, 2012, as part of the 2012 Republican Party presidential primaries for the 2012 U.S. presidential election. 172 delegates to the 2012 Republican National Convention were allocated to the presidential candidates.

Former Massachusetts Governor Mitt Romney won with 169 delegates, taking almost all of the delegate votes. The remaining three delegates were for "uncommitted". Romney also won 80% of the popular vote. Second was Ron Paul, member of the U.S. House of Representatives, who won 11% of the popular vote, and third was Rick Santorum, former chair of the Senate Republican Conference, with about 6% of the popular vote, although he withdrew from the race.

== Background ==
Mitt Romney launched his campaign in 2008, losing to John McCain, United States senator from Arizona, as well as losing California to McCain. Romney launched his re-election campaign in 2012, and won enough delegates to the 2012 Republican National Convention to challenge then-President Barack Obama.

== Candidates ==
There were nine candidates on the ballot, with three withdrawn, three write-in candidates, and uncommitted:

- Newt Gingrich (withdrawn)
- Donald James Gonzales (write-in)
- Jeremy Hannon (write-in)
- Sheldon Yeu Howard (write-in)
- Fred Karger
- Ron Paul
- Buddy Roemer (withdrawn)
- Mitt Romney
- Rick Santorum (withdrawn)
- Uncommitted

== Results ==
2012 California Republican presidential primary
Candidate	Popular vote	%	Delegates
Mitt Romney	1,530,513	79.51%	169
Ron Paul	199,246	10.35%	0
Rick Santorum (withdrawn)	102,258	5.31%	0
Newt Gingrich (withdrawn)	72,022	3.74%	0
Charles E. "Buddy" Roemer, III (withdrawn)	12,520	0.65%	0
Fred Karger	8,393	0.44%	0
Jeremy Hannon (write-in)	11	0.00%	0
Donald James Gonzales (write-in)	5	0.00%	0
Sheldon Yeu Howard (write-in)	2	0.00%	0
Uncommitted	—N/a		3
Total	1,924,970	100%	172
