= Warren Furutani =

American politician (born 1947)

Warren T. Furutani
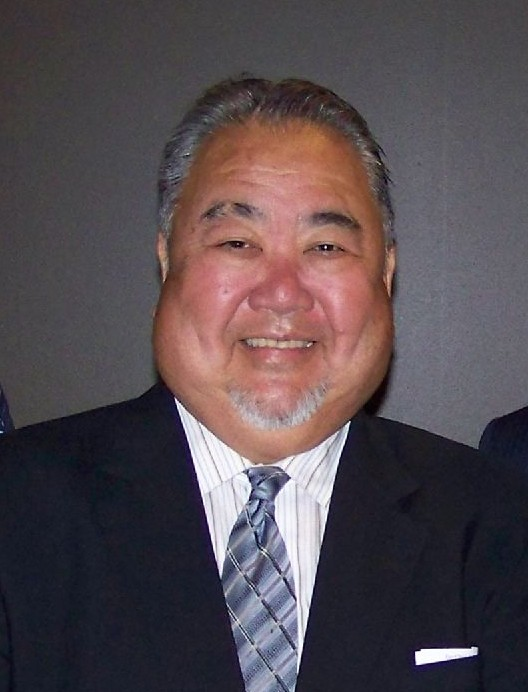

Member of the California State Assembly from the 55th district
- In office February 7, 2008 – November 30, 2012
- Preceded by: Laura Richardson
- Succeeded by: Curt Hagman

Personal details
- Born: October 16, 1947 (age 78) San Pedro, California
- Party: Democratic
- Spouse: Lisa
- Children: 2
- Education: Antioch University
- Profession: Politician

Warren T. Furutani (born October 16, 1947) is an American politician, who served in the California State Assembly from 2008 to 2012. A member of the Democratic Party, Furutani was elected in a special election in 2008 to replace Laura Richardson. He previously served on the Los Angeles Unified School District Board, where he became the first Asian member in 1987 and the LAUSD Board president in 1991, and later on the Los Angeles Community College District Board of Trustees.

== Early life and education ==
Furutani is a fourth-generation Japanese American. He graduated from Gardena High School in 1965. He attended several community colleges and earned a B.A. degree from Antioch University.

== Activism ==
During the mid-1960s, Furutani became more politically minded due to the social climate of the nation at the time, in large part because of his own family's history. He became a civil rights activist and became involved in what were to become the early stages of the Asian American Movement. Furutani worked tirelessly to establish admissions programs for students of color at colleges and universities throughout the United States. He helped many campuses establish ethnic studies programs and was instrumental in UCLA and Long Beach State University adopting an Asian American Studies program.

== Early career ==
He was one of 150 people to make the first organized pilgrimage to Manzanar in December 1969.

In 1970, Warren helped to create the Manzanar Committee that worked to get Manzanar designated as a national historical site.

== Career ==
Prior to being elected to the Assembly, he served on the Los Angeles Unified School District and then the Los Angeles Community College District Board of Trustees. In 1987, he became the first Asian Pacific American ever elected to the LAUSD and was the board's president in 1991. Furutani was elected in a special election in 2008 to the California State Assembly. He replaced Laura Richardson, who won a special election to replace Juanita Millender-McDonald as the member of the US House of Representatives from California's 37th district. He served until 2012 and did not run for re-election after that.

== Electoral history ==
California's 55th State Assembly district special election, 2008
| Party | Candidate | Votes | % |
|---|---|---|---|
| Democratic | Warren Furutani | 48,419 | 69.80 |
| American Independent | Charlotte Gibson | 10,785 | 15.55 |
| Libertarian | Herb Peters | 10,168 | 14.66 |
| Valid ballots | | 69,372 | 79.80 |
| Invalid or blank votes | | 17,670 | 20.30 |
| Total votes | | 87,042 | 100.00 |
| Turnout | | | 50.96 |
| Democratic hold | | | |

California's 55th State Assembly district general election, 2010
| Party | Candidate | Votes | % |
|---|---|---|---|
| Democratic | Warren Furutani | 61,088 | 70.69 |
| Republican | Christopher Salabaj | 25,328 | 29.31 |
| Total votes | | 86,416 | 100.00 |
| Democratic hold | | | |

California's 35th State Senate district election, 2016
Primary election
| Party | Candidate | Votes | % |
|---|---|---|---|
| Democratic | Steven Bradford | 50,998 | 35.6 |
| Democratic | Warren Furutani | 35,024 | 24.4 |
| Democratic | Isaac Galvan | 32,105 | 22.4 |
| Republican | Charlotte Ann Svolos | 25,197 | 17.6 |
| Total votes | | 143,324 | 100.0 |
General election
| Democratic | Steven Bradford | 135,353 | 53.5 |
| Democratic | Warren Furutani | 117,455 | 46.5 |
| Total votes | | 252,808 | 100.0 |
| Democratic hold | | | |

== Controversy ==
On June 15, 2011, during an Assembly debate on a redevelopment bill, Assemblyman Donald P. Wagner remarked that the bill was like something he had "seen on The Sopranos" and likened the author of the bill to Tony Soprano. After Assemblyman Anthony Portantino told Wagner to apologize for the remarks, Wagner replied that he would "apologize to any Italian-American who is NOT in the Mafia or involved in insurance scams". Within seconds, a verbal confrontation erupted on the Assembly floor between Wagner and Furutani and the two had to be separated.

== Personal life ==
He and his wife, Lisa, are residents of Gardena, California.
