= 2008 California Proposition 91 =

Failed ballot proposition on fuel tax use

California Proposition 91 was a failed proposal to amend the California Constitution to prohibit motor vehicle fuel sales taxes that are earmarked for transportation purposes from being retained in the state's general fund. The proposition appeared on the ballot of the February primary election.

== Proposal ==
The proposition would have prohibited motor vehicle fuel taxes, earmarked for the Transportation Investment Fund, from being kept in the General Fund. However, there would have been some exceptions.

== Developments before election ==
Proponents of Proposition 91 asked voters to vote "no" on Proposition 91 because the passage of Proposition 1A in 2006 has already prevented the use of gas tax dollars from being spent for non-transportation purposes. However, an independent campaign to pass Proposition 1A has been sponsored separately by the Southern California Transit Advocates, a non-profit transit advocacy organization. Other supporters include State Senator Tom McClintock and former State Senator Bill Leonard.

== Results ==
No 50%–60% 60%–70% 70%–80%

Proposition 91
Choice	Votes	%
For	3,427,588	41.69
Against	4,794,776	58.31
Total	8,222,364	100.00
Valid votes	8,222,364	90.67
Invalid/blank votes	846,051	9.33
Total votes	9,068,415	100.00
Registered voters/turnout		57.71

== See also ==
- United States energy law
