= 2006 California Proposition 82 =

California Proposition 82 was a proposition on the ballot for California voters in the primary election of June 6, 2006. The proposition would have made a free, voluntary, half-day public preschool program available to all four-year-olds in California. The State would have imposed a new tax on high-income taxpayers to pay for the new program. It was proposed by movie producer Rob Reiner. On the ballot, it received 1,583,787 (39.1%) yes votes and 2,460,556 (60.9%) no votes, thereby not passing.

The Proposition would have received its revenue through a 1.7% tax on individual income over $400,000 and couples’ income over $800,000. The estimated fiscal impact was an increase in annual revenues of $2.1 billion in 2007–08, growing with the economy in future years. All revenues would have been spent on the new preschool program.

Results by county: No: 50–60%; 60–70%; 70–80%; Yes: 50–60%
