= 2008 California Republican presidential primary =

- February 5, 2008

173 delegates to the Republican National Convention (170 pledged, 3 unpledged)

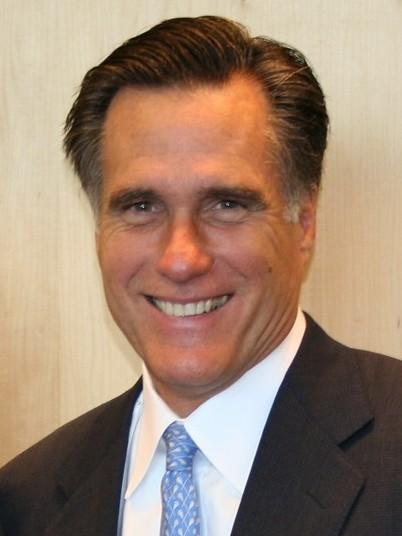

Nominee	John McCain	Mitt Romney	Mike Huckabee
Home state	Arizona	Massachusetts	Arkansas
Delegate count	155	15	0
Popular vote	1,238,988	1,013,471	340,669
Percentage	42.25%	34.56%	11.62%

John McCain	Mitt Romney

The 2008 California Republican presidential primary was held on February 5, 2008, with a total of 173 national delegates at stake.

== Process ==
The delegates represented California at the Republican National Convention. There were three delegates to every congressional district and fourteen bonus delegates. The winner in each of the 53 congressional districts was awarded all of that district's delegates. The statewide winner was awarded 11 of the 14 statewide delegates, with the 3 remaining delegates assigned to party leaders. Voting in the primary was restricted to registered Republican voters.

== Polls ==
Early polls showed Rudy Giuliani in the lead. Polls taken closer to the primary either showed Mitt Romney or John McCain as the favored candidate.

== Results ==
Key:	Withdrew prior to contest

California Republican presidential primary, 2008
Candidate	Votes	Percentage	National delegates
John McCain	1,238,988	42.25%	155
Mitt Romney	1,013,471	34.56%	15
Mike Huckabee	340,669	11.62%	0
Rudy Giuliani	128,681	4.39%	0
Ron Paul	125,365	4.27%	0
Fred Thompson	50,275	1.71%	0
Duncan Hunter	14,021	0.48%	0
Alan Keyes	11,742	0.40%	0
John Cox	3,219	0.11%	0
Tom Tancredo	3,884	0.13%	0
Sam Brownback	2,486	0.08%	0
Karen Irish (write-in)	6	0.00%	0
Michael Shaw (write-in)	2	0.00%	0
Edward Marshall (write-in)	1	0.00%	0
Joel Neuberg (write-in)	1	0.00%	0
Robert Brickell (write-in)	0	0.00%	0
Brian Calef (write-in)	0	0.00%	0
David Frey (write-in)	0	0.00%	0
Walter Rothnie (write-in)	0	0.00%	0
John Sutherland (write-in)	0	0.00%	0
Uncommitted delegates	3		
Totals	2,932,811	100.00%	173
Voter turnout	56.08%		—

== See also ==
- California Democratic primary, 2008
- California state elections, February 2008
- Republican Party (United States) presidential primaries, 2008
- United States presidential election in California, 2008
