= 2004 California Proposition 62 =

Referendum on elections

Proposition 62 was a California ballot proposition on the November 2, 2004 ballot. It failed to pass with 5,119,155 (46.1%) votes in favor and 5,968,770 (53.9%) against.

Officially known as the Voter Choice Open Primary Act, the proposition was an initiative constitutional amendment and statute that provided for a modified blanket primary (two-round) election system like that used in the state of Louisiana.

Under the provisions of the proposition, instead of traditional partisan primary elections for statewide offices (in which voters have to be registered with a political party to choose the nominee of that party in the primary), all candidates for election would appear on the primary election ballot (first round ballot), and all voters could vote for any candidate regardless of the party affiliation of the voter or candidates. The two candidates with the most votes (regardless of party or lack thereof) would later appear on the general election (second round) ballot.

Prop 62 would have affected elections to all statewide elected officers (Governor, Lieutenant Governor, Attorney General, Insurance Commissioner, Controller, Secretary of State, and Treasurer), for the California State Legislature, and for federal congressional elections (to both the U.S. House of Representatives and the U.S. Senate. The proposition did exempt presidential primary elections and elections of party central committees.

The provisions of Proposition 62 conflicted with those of Proposition 60, which the California State Legislature referred on the ballot. That proposition essentially re-affirmed the existing partisan primary system. The California Constitution provides that if the provisions of two approved propositions are in conflict, only the provisions of the measure with the higher number of "yes" votes at the statewide election take effect. Since Prop 60 passed and Prop 62 did not, the issue was moot.

Proposition 62 results by county No: 60–70%; 50–60%; Yes: 50–60%

== Official summary ==
- Requires primary elections where all voters may vote for any state or federal candidate regardless of how a voter or candidate is registered.
- Exempts presidential nominations and elections of party-central committees.
- Only the two primary election candidates receiving most votes for an office, whether they are candidates with "no party" or members of same or different party, would be listed on general election ballot.
- In special primary election, candidate receiving majority vote is elected.
- Requires political party's consent for identification of candidates' party registration on ballot and in other official election publications.

Summary of Legislative Analyst's Estimate of Net State and Local Government Fiscal Impact:

- No significant net fiscal effect on state and local governments.

== See also ==
List of California ballot propositions 2000-present
