= 2009 California Proposition 1D =

Proposition 1D
- May 19, 2009
- Protects Children's Services Funding. Helps Balance State Budget.

Results
Choice	Votes	%
Yes	1,633,107	34.09%
No	3,157,680	65.91%
Total votes	4,790,787	100.00%
County results
Against
70–80%
60–70%
50–60%

Proposition 1D was a defeated California ballot proposition that appeared on the May 19, 2009 special election ballot. The measure was legislatively referred by the State Legislature. If approved, the proposition would have authorized a one-time reallocation of tobacco tax revenue to help balance the state budget.

== Background ==
In February 2009, the State Legislature narrowly passed the 2008–2009 state budget during a special session, months after it was due. As part of the plan to lower the state's annual deficits, the State Legislature ordered a special election with various budget reform ballot propositions, among them Proposition 1D.

The proposition was part of Assembly Bill 17 (Third Extraordinary Session), which was authored by Assemblywoman Noreen Evans, a Democrat from Santa Rosa. The bill passed in the State Assembly by a vote of 75 to 3 and in the State Senate by a vote of 37 to 0.

== Proposal ==
Proposition 1D, officially entitled "Budget Act of 2008. Children and Families Act: use of funds: services for children.", would have authorized a fund-shift of $268 million in annual tobacco tax revenue currently earmarked for First Five early childhood development programs under the terms of Proposition 10. That revenue, plus $340 million in unspent First Five tobacco tax money held in a reserve fund at the time, would have instead been used to pay for other state government health and human services programs that serve children, including Medi-Cal, foster care, child care subsidies, preschool programs, and more. Money for these programs came from the state's General Fund at the time.

At the time, 80% of First Five money was distributed to county governments for similar programs, including government "school readiness" programs for pre-schoolers, Medi-Cal health coverage to children whose family income is above the cap for that program, government parent-education training, food and clothing subsidies, and more. Under Proposition 1D, that revenue stream would have ceased for five years, essentially ending most First Five programs.

== Results ==
Proposition 1D
Choice	Votes	%
For	1,633,107	34.09
Against	3,157,680	65.91
Total	4,790,787	100.00
Valid votes	4,790,787	98.33
Invalid/blank votes	81,158	1.67
Total votes	4,871,945	100.00
Registered voters/turnout	17,153,012	28.40
