= 2005 California Proposition 74 =

Proposition 74 (2005) was a ballot proposition in the 2005 California special election that intended to extend probationary periods for the state's public school teachers from two years to five before attaining tenure. It failed at the polls, with 55% of voters rejecting it.

== Background ==
New Jersey became the first state to pass tenure legislation when, in 1910, it granted fair-dismissal rights to college professors. The Incumbent law, passed in 1983, required that teachers be evaluated for performance during a two-year probationary period before gaining tenure. In the winter of 2004, California Governor Arnold Schwarzenegger sponsored a bill to amend the state Constitution to require merit pay for teachers. The state legislature voted against the bill in February 2005. The following month, Governor Schwarzenegger formally endorsed the Put Kids First Act, written and submitted by Assemblymember Bonnie Garcia (Republican, Cathedral City). That act laid out the conditions for Proposition 74, including increasing the probationary period from two to five years and allowing school districts to dismiss teachers who receive two consecutive negative job evaluations. It qualified for the ballot on June 6.

== Summary (From the State Attorney General) ==
Proposition 74: Public School Teachers. Waiting Period for Permanent Status. Dismissal. Initiative Statute.

- Increases the length of time required before a teacher may become a permanent employee from two complete consecutive school years to five complete consecutive school years
- The measure applies to teachers whose probationary period commenced during or after the fiscal year 2003–2004.
- Modifies how school boards can dismiss a permanent teaching employee who receives two consecutive unsatisfactory performance evaluations.

Summary of estimate by Legislative Analyst and Director of Finance of fiscal impact on state and local governments:

- Changes in teacher tenure and dismissal practices have an unknown impact on school district teacher salary costs. Fiscal impacts could vary significantly district by district.

== Campaign ==
=== Support ===
Governor Schwarzenegger, former United States Secretary of State and economic advisor to the governor, George Shultz, and Fresno County Superintendent of Schools Pete Mehas supported Proposition 74. Prop 74 was one of four propositions (the other three were 73, 75, and 76) that the governor touted as his reform package.

One major point the proponents constantly cited was a horror story: A Riverside teacher swore at her students, showed them R-rated movies, and generally was a bad teacher; however, due to tenure rules, the district had to pay the teacher US$25,000 to quit. They said Proposition 74 would make it easier to fire these kinds of teachers because they had a longer tenure period and less paperwork and procedures to fire a teacher.

=== Opposition ===
California's two teachers unions, the California Teachers Association and California Federation of Teachers, and state superintendent of education Jack O'Connell, opposed the measure. The union's arguments against Proposition 74 included that its new requirements would discourage new teachers and encourage school districts to lay off older teachers, who cost more in salary and benefits, while doing little to nothing to improve classrooms.

== Result ==
On November 8, 2005, California voters soundly rejected the proposition, with 44.8% voting for and 55.2% voting against.

Proposition 74 results by county No: 70–80%; 60–70%; 50–60%; Yes: 60–70%; 50–60%
