= 2009 California Proposition 1B =

Defeated referendum on education funding

Proposition 1B was a defeated California ballot proposition that appeared on the May 19, 2009 special election ballot. The measure was legislatively referred to the ballot by the State Legislature. If passed it would have secured additional funding for primary education. Additionally, Proposition 1B would have only passed if Proposition 1A passed as well.

== Background ==
In February 2009 the State Legislature narrowly passed the 2008–2009 state budget during a special session, months after it was due. As part of the plan to lower the state's annual deficits, the State Legislature ordered a special election with various budget reform ballot propositions, among them Proposition 1B.

The proposition was part of Assembly Constitutional Amendment 2 (Third Extraordinary Session), which was authored by Speaker of the State Assembly Karen Bass, a Democrat from Los Angeles. The amendment passed in the State Assembly by a vote of 68 to 11 and in the State Senate by a vote of 28 to 10.

== Proposal ==
Proposition 1B would have mandated supplemental payments of $9.3 billion to schools and community colleges. This figure was the difference between the amount actually appropriated in recent budgets, and the amount that, under some interpretations of Proposition 98, should have been spent. If approved by a popular vote majority, the measure would only have been enacted if Proposition 1A had also been approved.

== Results ==
Electoral results by county

Proposition 1B
Choice	Votes	%
For	1,834,242	38.14
Against	2,975,560	61.86
Total	4,809,802	100.00
Valid votes	4,809,802	98.72
Invalid/blank votes	62,143	1.28
Total votes	4,871,945	100.00
Registered voters/turnout	17,153,012	28.40
