= 2008 California elections =

November 2008 California elections
- November 4, 2008
- Registered: 17,304,091
- Turnout: 79.42% (▲23.23 pp)

Elections were held in California on November 4, 2008. Among the elections taking place were those for the office of President of the United States, all the seats of California's delegation to the House of Representatives, all of the seats of the State Assembly, and all of the odd-numbered seats of the State Senate. Twelve propositions also appeared on the ballot. Numerous local elections also took place throughout the state.

== President ==
United States presidential election in California, 2008
Party	Candidate	Running mate	Votes	Percentage	Electoral votes
Democratic	Barack Obama	Joe Biden	8,274,473	61.01%	55
Republican	John McCain	Sarah Palin	5,011,781	36.95%	0
Peace and Freedom	Ralph Nader	Matt Gonzalez	108,381	0.80%	0
Libertarian	Bob Barr	Wayne Allyn Root	67,582	0.50%	0
American Independent	Alan Keyes	Brian Rohrbough	40,673	0.30%	0
Green	Cynthia McKinney	Rosa Clemente	38,774	0.29%	0
Independent	Ron Paul (write-in)	Gail Lightfoot	17,006	0.13%	0
Independent	Chuck Baldwin (write-in)	Darrell Castle	3,145	0.02%	0
Independent	James Harris (write-in)	Alyson Kennedy	49	0.00%	0
Independent	Frank Moore (write-in)	Susan Block	36	0.00%	0
Valid votes			13,561,900	98.68%	—
Invalid or blank votes			181,277	1.32%	—
Totals			13,743,177	100.00%	55
Voter turnout			79.42%		—

== United States House of Representatives ==
All 53 seats of the United States House of Representatives in California were up for election. Before and after the election, 34 seats were under Democratic control and 19 were under Republican control.

United States House of Representatives elections in California, 2008
Party	Votes	Percentage	Seats	+/–
Democratic	7,380,825	59.90%	34	0
Republican	4,515,925	36.65%	19	0
Libertarian	220,118	1.79%	0	0
Independent	90,340	0.73%	0	0
Green	60,926	0.49%	0	0
Peace and Freedom	47,659	0.39%	0	0
American Independent	6,286	0.05%	0	0
Valid votes	12,322,079	89.66%	—	—
Invalid or blank votes	1,421,098	10.34%	—	—
Totals	13,743,177	100.00%	53	—
Voter turnout	79.42%			

== California State Senate ==

The California State Senate is the upper house of California's bicameral State Legislature. There are a total of 40 seats and only the 20 odd-numbered ones were up for election. The Democratic Party maintained a majority of 25, with the remaining 15 seats under the control of the Republican Party. Neither party lost or gained any seats.

California State Senate elections, 2008
Party	Votes	Percentage	Seats up	Seats not up	Total seats	+/–
Democratic	3,786,204	55.06%	11	14	25	0
Republican	2,837,361	41.27%	9	6	15	0
Independent	131,248	1.91%	0	0	0	0
Libertarian	94,132	1.37%	0	0	0	0
Peace and Freedom	26,996	0.39%	0	0	0	0
Totals	6,875,941	100.00%	20	20	40	—
Voter turnout	72.60%					

== California State Assembly ==

The California State Assembly is the lower house of California's State Legislature. All 80 seats were up for election every two years. Before the election, the Democrats controlled 48 seats, while the Republicans controlled 32. After the election, the Democrats increased its majority to 51, while the Republican minority shrank to 29. A total of five seats changed parties: four to the Democrats and one to the Republicans.

California State Assembly elections, 2008
Party	Votes	Percentage	Seats	+/–
Democratic	6,905,219	57.80%	51	+3
Republican	4,830,252	40.43%	29	–3
Libertarian	171,324	1.43%	0	0
Peace and Freedom	33,212	0.28%	0	0
Green	6,505	0.05%	0	0
Independent	27	0.00%	0	0
Valid votes	11,946,539	86.93%	—	—
Invalid or blank votes	1,796,638	13.07%	—	—
Totals	13,743,177	100.00%	80	—
Voter turnout	79.42%			

== Propositions ==
=== Proposition 1A ===

Proposition 1A is a bond measure to fund the California High-Speed Rail line from Los Angeles to San Francisco.

Proposition 1A
Choice	Votes	%
For	6,680,485	52.62
Against	6,015,944	47.38
Total	12,696,429	100.00
Valid votes	12,696,429	92.38
Invalid/blank votes	1,046,748	7.62
Total votes	13,743,177	100.00
Registered voters/turnout		79.42

=== Proposition 2 ===

Proposition 2 is an initiative statute regarding standards for confining farm animals.

Proposition 2
Choice	Votes	%
For	8,203,769	63.42
Against	4,731,738	36.58
Total	12,935,507	100.00
Valid votes	12,935,507	94.12
Invalid/blank votes	807,670	5.88
Total votes	13,743,177	100.00
Registered voters/turnout		79.42

=== Proposition 3 ===

Proposition 3 is an initiative statute that authorizes children's hospital bonds and grants.

Proposition 3
Choice	Votes	%
For	6,984,319	55.26
Against	5,654,586	44.74
Total	12,638,905	100.00
Valid votes	12,638,905	91.96
Invalid/blank votes	1,104,272	8.04
Total votes	13,743,177	100.00
Registered voters/turnout		79.42

=== Proposition 4 ===

Proposition 4 is an initiative constitutional amendment regarding waiting periods and parental notification before termination of a minor's pregnancy.

Proposition 4
Choice	Votes	%
For	6,220,473	48.04
Against	6,728,478	51.96
Total	12,948,951	100.00
Valid votes	12,948,951	94.22
Invalid/blank votes	794,226	5.78
Total votes	13,743,177	100.00
Registered voters/turnout		79.42

=== Proposition 5 ===

Proposition 5 is an initiative statute regarding nonviolent offenders, sentencing, parole, and rehabilitation.

Proposition 5
Choice	Votes	%
For	5,155,206	40.52
Against	7,566,783	59.48
Total	12,721,989	100.00
Valid votes	12,721,989	92.57
Invalid/blank votes	1,021,188	7.43
Total votes	13,743,177	100.00
Registered voters/turnout		79.42

=== Proposition 6 ===

Proposition 6 is an initiative statute regarding criminal penalties and public safety funding.

Proposition 6
Choice	Votes	%
For	3,824,372	30.88
Against	8,559,647	69.12
Total	12,384,019	100.00
Valid votes	12,384,019	90.11
Invalid/blank votes	1,359,158	9.89
Total votes	13,743,177	100.00
Registered voters/turnout		79.42

=== Proposition 7 ===

Proposition 7 is an initiative statute regarding renewable energy.

Proposition 7
Choice	Votes	%
For	4,502,235	35.57
Against	8,155,181	64.43
Total	12,657,416	100.00
Valid votes	12,657,416	92.10
Invalid/blank votes	1,085,761	7.90
Total votes	13,743,177	100.00
Registered voters/turnout		79.42

=== Proposition 8 ===

Proposition 8 is an initiative constitutional amendment that would ban same-sex marriage in California.

Proposition 8
Choice	Votes	%
For	7,001,084	52.24
Against	6,401,482	47.76
Total	13,402,566	100.00
Valid votes	13,402,566	97.52
Invalid/blank votes	340,611	2.48
Total votes	13,743,177	100.00
Registered voters/turnout		79.42

=== Proposition 9 ===

Proposition 9 is an initiative constitutional amendment and statute that deals with the criminal justice system, victims' rights, and parole.

Proposition 9
Choice	Votes	%
For	6,682,465	53.84
Against	5,728,968	46.16
Total	12,411,433	100.00
Valid votes	12,411,433	90.31
Invalid/blank votes	1,331,744	9.69
Total votes	13,743,177	100.00
Registered voters/turnout		79.42

=== Proposition 10 ===

Proposition 10 is an initiative statute that authorizes bonds for alternative fuel vehicles and renewable energy.

Proposition 10
Choice	Votes	%
For	5,098,666	40.59
Against	7,464,154	59.41
Total	12,562,820	100.00
Valid votes	12,562,820	91.41
Invalid/blank votes	1,180,357	8.59
Total votes	13,743,177	100.00
Registered voters/turnout		79.42

=== Proposition 11 ===

Proposition 11 is an initiative constitutional amendment and statute that deals with redistricting.

Proposition 11
Choice	Votes	%
For	6,095,033	50.82
Against	5,897,655	49.18
Total	11,992,688	100.00
Valid votes	11,992,688	87.26
Invalid/blank votes	1,750,489	12.74
Total votes	13,743,177	100.00
Registered voters/turnout		79.42

=== Proposition 12 ===

Proposition 12 is a bond measure that would assist veterans with buying property.

Proposition 12
Choice	Votes	%
For	7,807,630	63.53
Against	4,481,196	36.47
Total	12,288,826	100.00
Valid votes	12,288,826	89.42
Invalid/blank votes	1,454,351	10.58
Total votes	13,743,177	100.00
Registered voters/turnout		79.42

== See also ==
- February 2008 California elections
- June 2008 California elections
