= 2008 California Proposition 10 =

California Proposition 10, also known as the California Alternative Fuels Initiative, was an unsuccessful initiated state statute that appeared on the November 2008 ballot in California. Proposition 10 was funded by Clean Energy Fuels Corp., a corporation owned by T. Boone Pickens. Clean Energy Fuels Corp. is the nation's leading operator of natural gas vehicle fueling stations.

Proposition 10 was one of two ballot initiatives focusing on alternative fuels that appeared on the November 4, 2008 ballot in California. Both propositions were rejected by voters that day.

Proponents believe the proposal would have:

- Helped consumers and others purchase certain high fuel economy or alternative fuel vehicles, including natural gas vehicles, and to fund research into alternative fuel technology.
- Provided funding for research, development and production of renewable energy technology, primarily solar energy with additional funding for other forms of renewable energy; incentives for purchasing solar and renewable energy technology.
- Provided grants to cities for renewable energy projects and to colleges for training in renewable and energy efficiency technologies.

== Provisions of the initiative ==
The initiative authorizes $5 billion in bonds paid from state’s General Fund, allocated approximately as follows:

- 58% in cash payments of between $2,000 and $50,000 to purchasers of certain high fuel economy and alternative fuel vehicles;
- 20% in incentives for research, development and production of renewable energy technology;
- 11% in incentives for research and development of alternative fuel vehicle technology;
- 5% in incentives for purchase of renewable energy technology;
- 4% in grants to eight cities for education about these technologies; and
- 3% in grants to colleges to train students in these technologies.

=== Estimate of fiscal impact ===
According to the government's fiscal analysis office, the initiative would entail:

- State costs of about $9.8 billion over 30 years to pay both the principal ($5 billion) and interest ($4.8 billion) costs on the bond.
- Payments of about $325 million per year.
- Increase in state sales tax revenues of an unknown amount, potentially totaling in the tens of millions of dollars, over the period from 2009 to beyond 2018.
- Increase in local sales tax and VLF revenues of an unknown amount, potentially totaling in the tens of millions of dollars, over the period from 2009 to about 2018-19.
- Potential state costs of up to about $10 million annually, through about 2018 -19, for state agency administrative costs not funded by the measure.

== Supporters ==
- T. Boone Pickens
- Allison Hart, Mitzi Dudley and Thomas Daly filed the initial ballot language.

=== Funding and Boone Pickens ===
Reports filed through December 31, 2008 listed four major donors to the initiative:

- Clean Energy Fuels Corp. donated $18,647,250. Clean Energy Fuels Corp. is owned by T. Boone Pickens.
- Chesapeake Energy contributed $3,000,000.
- Aubrey McClendon, $500,000. McClendon lives in Oklahoma and is the co-founder of Chesapeake Energy.
- Westport Fuel Systems, $250,000.

On August 11, it was disclosed that U.S. House Speaker Nancy Pelosi is an investor in CEFC.,

Todd Campbell, Clean Energy's public policy director, in response to criticisms about CLNE sponsoring Prop. 10 because of potential benefits to the company told an 'Associated Press reporter, "I don’t think it’s a given that Clean Energy is going to cash in. I wish it were that simple."

=== Arguments in favor of Prop. 10 ===
The main arguments offered in favor of Prop. 10 are:

- The funding it provides will allow the generation of electricity from renewable sources, and provide consumer rebates for the purchase or lease of "clean alternative fuel vehicles".
- The funding will allow the replacement of older polluting diesel trucks with clean alternative fuel trucks and provide for research into alternative fuels.
- Will reduce dependence on foreign fuel and stop US dollars from going to hostile foreign governments.
- The diesel trucks that would be replaced produce dangerous pollution.
- Significant improvement in California Air quality, reduction of Air Pollution.
- Alternatives to high-priced gasoline are important.

=== Path to the ballot ===
Prop. 10 was qualified for the ballot through a petition drive conducted by Progressive Campaigns, Inc., at a cost of $2,418,178 and Forde and Mollrich, which was paid $660,084 for signatures. The total signature cost was $3,078,263.

== Opponents ==
=== Opposed by ===
- An official opposition group called "No on Proposition 10, Californians Against the $10 Billion Lemon, Sponsored by the Consumer Federation of California", registered with the California Secretary of State. The organization raised approximately $171,000, primarily from labor unions.
- Consumer Federation of California Executive Director Richard Holober managed the No on Proposition 10 campaign. The No on Proposition 10 campaign won endorsements from every major labor, consumer, taxpayer, business and environmental organization in California, including the California Labor Federation, the Sierra Club, The Natural Resources Defense Council, the Howard Jarvis Taxpayers Association, the California Taxpayers Association, the California Democratic Party, and the California Chamber of Commerce.
- Forty daily newspapers wrote editorials against Proposition 10.

=== Arguments against Prop. 10 ===
- Would require taking $10 billion out of the state's general fund over a 30-year period.
- There are relatively few mechanics who know how to fix natural-gas engines and few filling stations offer natural gas.

== Newspaper endorsements ==
=== Opposed to Prop. 10 ===
The Los Angeles Times editorialized against Prop. 10 on September 19, saying, "Spending bond money on something as intangible as privately owned vehicles is a terrible idea" The Santa Monica Mirror said, "Self-serving Prop. 10 sounds good, should lose".

The San Francisco Chronicle is opposed, writing, "The chief backer and bill payer for the measure is T. Boone Pickens, the folksy Texas oilman and apostle for energy independence who founded a firm that just happens to supply natural gas for cars and trucks".

== Results ==
Electoral votes by county.

Proposition 10
| Choice | Votes | % |
|---|---|---|
| For | 5,098,666 | 40.59 |
| Against | 7,464,154 | 59.41 |
| Total | 12,562,820 | 100.00 |
| Valid votes | 12,562,820 | 91.41 |
| Invalid/blank votes | 1,180,357 | 8.59 |
| Total votes | 13,743,177 | 100.00 |
| Registered voters/turnout | | 79.42 |
