= 2005 California special election =

- November 8, 2005
- Registered: 15,891,482
- Turnout: 50.14%

Special elections were held in California on November 8, 2005, after being called by Governor Arnold Schwarzenegger on June 13, 2005.

The California special election of 2005 was held on November 8, 2005, after being called by Governor Arnold Schwarzenegger on June 13, 2005. California voters rejected all eight ballot propositions. Propositions 73, 76, and 77 were initiative constitutional amendments while the others were initiative statutes. The election was believed to have been the most expensive in California history. Lobby groups spent hundreds of millions of dollars on gathering signatures and advertising for this election.

== Overview ==
Schwarzenegger called the election to allow voters to decide on propositions regarding teacher tenure requirements (Proposition 74), the use of union dues for political campaign contributions (Proposition 75), state budgetary spending limits (Proposition 76), and redistricting (Proposition 77). Schwarzenegger originally proposed a fifth proposition on the issue of public pension, but dropped that proposition amid criticism that the proposition would eliminate death benefits to widows of police and firefighters who died in the line of duty. The four propositions that made it to the ballot eventually came to be known as Governor Schwarzenegger's reform agenda. The governor claimed his agenda would clear the way for correction of the problems he was elected to solve.

An alliance of public sector unions expended $24 million campaigning against Schwarzenegger's fiscal reform, with the California Teachers Association expending an additional $56 million and going so far as to mortgage its Sacramento headquarters to fund more campaign spending. Schwarzenegger likewise spent nearly $8 million of his own fortune campaigning. The tenor was highly divisive, with Schwarzenegger calling his opponents “stooges” and at one point Warren Beatty leading a bus full of public employees to follow the governor and shout down his events.

All Governor Schwarzenegger's other fiscal reform agenda initiatives were defeated by wide margins. It had been the most expensive election in California history. As the results came out in Sacramento a public union boss waived a broom over his head while state employees chanted “sweep, sweep, sweep”. SEIU's use of compulsory fees on nonmembers to fund its campaign was later found illegal by the U.S. Supreme Court in Knox v. Service Employees International Union, Local 1000.

Four other propositions appeared on the ballot because they qualified for the next statewide elections. The four other propositions were:

- Proposition 73: Parental notification for abortions by minors
- Proposition 78: A proposition on prescription drugs put by the pharmaceutical industry
- Proposition 79: A proposition on prescription drugs put by consumer groups in response to Proposition 78
- Proposition 80: Electric industry regulation

=== Final results ===
Proposition	Pass	Title	Yes Votes	Pct.	No Votes	Pct.
73	No	Minor's Pregnancy	3,130,062	47.4	3,465,629	52.6
74	No	Teacher Tenure	2,987,010	44.9	3,662,932	55.1
75	No	Public Union Dues	3,092,495	46.5	3,551,011	53.5
76	No	Spending/Funding	2,522,327	37.9	4,115,388	62.1
77	No	Redistricting	2,673,530	40.5	3,920,487	59.5
78	No	Rx Drug Discounts	2,719,999	41.5	3,821,957	58.5
79	No	Rx Drug Rebates	2,523,803	38.9	3,950,763	61.1
80	No	Electric Regulation	2,189,126	34.3	4,182,374	65.7

== Propositions ==
=== Proposition 73: Parental Notification ===
==== Summary ====
Amends California Constitution to bar abortion on unemancipated minor until 48 hours after physician notifies minor's parent/legal guardian, except in medical emergency or with parental waiver. Permits judicial waiver of notice based on clear and convincing evidence of minor's maturity or minor's best interests. Physician must report abortions performed on minors and State shall compile statistics. Authorizes monetary damages for violation. Minor must consent to abortion unless mentally incapable or in medical emergency. Permits judicial relief if minor's consent to abortion is coerced.

==== Opinion Polls ====
Source	Yes	No	Undecided	Spread
PPIC (10/16-23)	42%	48%	10%	NO +6
Survey USA (10/15-17)	60%	38%	2%	YES +22
Survey USA (9/30-10/2)	59%	39%	2%	YES +20
Field Poll (8/19-29)	45%	44%	10%	EVEN
PPIC (8/8-15)	44%	48%	10%	NO +4
Field Poll (6/13-19)	48%	43%	9%	YES +5

==== Results ====
Option	Vote Count	Percentage
Yes	3,130,062	47.4%
No	3,465,629	52.6%

Proposition 73 results by county No: 70–80%; 60–70%; 50–60%; Yes: 60–70%; 50–60%; Tie: 50%

=== Proposition 74: Public School Teachers Tenure ===
==== Summary ====
Increases length of time required before a teacher may become a permanent employee from two complete consecutive school years to five complete consecutive school years; measure applies to teachers whose probationary period commenced during or after the 2003-2004 fiscal year. Authorizes school boards to dismiss a permanent teaching employee who receives two consecutive unsatisfactory performance evaluations.

==== Opinion Polls ====
Source	Yes	No	Undecided	Spread
PPIC (10/16-23)	46%	48%	6%	NO+2
Survey USA (10/15-17)	53%	45%	1%	YES +8
Survey USA (9/30-10/2)	55%	44%	2%	YES +10
PPIC (9/12-19)	43%	47%	10%	NO +4
Field Poll (8/19-29)	46%	37%	17%	YES +9
PPIC (8/8-15)	49%	42%	9%	YES +7
Field Poll (6/13-19)	61%	32%	7%	YES +29

==== Results ====
Option	Vote Count	Percentage
Yes	2,987,010	44.9%
No	3,662,932	55.1

Proposition 74 results by county No: 70–80%; 60–70%; 50–60%; Yes: 60–70%; 50–60%

=== Proposition 75: Union Dues - Political Contributions ===
==== Summary ====
Prohibits public employee labor organizations from using dues or fees for political contributions unless the employee provides prior consent each year on a specified written form. Prohibition does not apply to dues or fees collected for charitable organizations, health care insurance, or other purposes directly benefiting the public employee. Requires labor organizations to maintain and submit to the California Fair Political Practices Commission records concerning individual employees' and organizations' political contributions; those records are not subject to public disclosure.

==== Opinion Polls ====
Source	Yes	No	Undecided	Spread
PPIC (10/16-23)	46%	46%	8%	Even
Survey USA (10/15-17)	56%	42%	2%	YES +14
Survey USA (9/30-10/2)	60%	37%	3%	YES +23
Field Poll (8/19-29)	55%	32%	13%	YES +23
PPIC (8/8-15)	48%	33%	9%	YES +15
Field Poll (6/13-19)	57%	34%	9%	YES +23

==== Results ====
Option	Vote Count	Percentage
Yes	3,092,495	46.5%
No	3,551,011	53.5%

Proposition 75 results by county No: 70–80%; 60–70%; 50–60%; Yes: 60–70%; 50–60%

=== Proposition 76: State Spending Limits ===
==== Summary ====
Changes state minimum school funding requirements (Proposition 98), permitting suspension of minimum funding, but terminating repayment requirement, and eliminating authority to reduce funding when state revenues decrease. Excludes above-minimum appropriations from schools' funding base. Limits state spending to prior year total plus revenue growth. Shifts excess revenues from schools/tax relief to budget reserve, specified construction, debt repayment. Requires Governor to reduce state appropriations, under specified circumstances, including employee compensation, state contracts. Continues prior year appropriations if new state budget delayed. Prohibits state special funds borrowing. Requires payment of local government mandates.

==== Opinion Polls ====
Source	Yes	No	Undecided	Spread
PPIC (10/16-23)	30%	62%	8%	NO +32
Survey USA (10/15-17)	54%	41%	5%	YES +13
Survey USA (9/30-10/2)	58%	36%	6%	YES +22
PPIC (9/12-19)	26%	63%	11%	NO +37
Field Poll (8/19-29)	19%	65%	16%	NO +46
PPIC (8/8-15)	28%	61%	11%	NO +33
Field Poll (6/13-19)	35%	42%	23%	NO +7

==== Results ====
Option	Vote Count	Percentage
Yes	2,522,327	37.9%
No	4,115,388	62.1%

Proposition 76 results by county No: 80–90%; 70–80%; 60–70%; 50–60%; Yes: 50–60%

=== Proposition 77: Redistricting ===
==== Summary ====
Amends state Constitution's process for redistricting California's Senate, Assembly, Congressional and Board of Equalization districts. Requires three-member panel of retired judges, selected by legislative leaders, to adopt new redistricting plan if measure passes and again after each national census. Panel must consider legislative, public proposals/comments and hold public hearings. Redistricting plan becomes effective immediately when adopted by judges’ panel and filed with Secretary of State. If voters subsequently reject redistricting plan, process repeats. Specifies time for judicial review of adopted redistricting plan; if plan fails to conform to requirements, court may order new plan.

==== Opinion Polls ====
Source	Yes	No	Undecided	Spread
PPIC (10/16-23)	36%	50%	14%	NO +14
Survey USA (10/15-17)	54%	41%	5%	YES +13
Survey USA (9/30-10/2)	59%	36%	5%	YES +23
PPIC (9/12-19)	33%	50%	17%	NO +17
Field Poll (8/19-29)	32%	46%	22%	NO +14
PPIC (8/8-15)	34%	49%	17%	NO +15
Field Poll (6/13-19)	35%	46%	19%	NO +11

==== Results ====
Option	Vote Count	Percentage
Yes	2,673,530	40.5%
No	3,920,487	59.5%

Proposition 77 results by county No: 70–80%; 60–70%; 50–60%; Yes: 50–60%

=== Proposition 78: Drug Discounts ===
==== Summary ====
Establishes discount prescription drug program, overseen by the Department of Health Services. Enables certain low - and moderate - income California residents to purchase prescription drugs at reduced prices. Imposes $15 application fee, renewable annually. Requires Department's prompt determination of residents' eligibility, based on listed qualifications. Authorizes Department to contract with pharmacies to sell prescription drugs at agreed-upon discounts negotiated in advance, and to negotiate rebate agreements with drug manufacturers. Permits outreach programs to increase public awareness. Creates state fund for deposit of rebate payments from drug manufacturers. Allows program to be terminated under specified conditions.

==== Opinion Polls ====
Source	Yes	No	Undecided	Spread
PPIC (9/12-19)	43%	38%	19%	YES +5
Field Poll (8/19-29)	49%	31%	20%	YES +18
Field Poll (6/13-19)	57%	26%	17%	YES +31

==== Results ====
Option	Vote Count	Percentage
Yes	2,719,999	41.5%
No	3,821,957	58.5%

Proposition 78 results by county No: 70–80%; 60–70%; 50–60%; Yes: 50–60%

=== Proposition 79: Drug Discounts (Consumer Groups Backed) ===
==== Summary ====
Provides for prescription drug discounts to Californians who qualify based on income-related standards, to be funded through rebates from participating drug manufacturers negotiated by California Department of Health Services. Rebates must be deposited in State Treasury fund, used only to reimburse pharmacies for discounts and to offset administration costs. At least 95% of rebates must go to fund discounts. Prohibits new Medi-Cal contracts with manufacturers not providing the Medicaid best price to this program, except for drugs without therapeutic equivalent. Establishes oversight board. Makes prescription drug profiteering, as defined, unlawful.

==== Opinion Polls ====
Source	Yes	No	Undecided	Spread
PPIC (9/12-19)	34%	40%	26%	NO +6
Field Poll (8/19-29)	42%	34%	24%	YES +8
Field Poll (6/13-19)	48%	33%	19%	YES +15

==== Results ====
Option	Vote Count	Percentage
Yes	2,523,803	38.9%
No	3,950,763	61.1%

Proposition 79 results by county No: 70–80%; 60–70%; 50–60%; Yes: 60–70%; 50–60%

=== Proposition 80: Electricity Regulation ===
==== Summary ====
Subjects electric service providers, as defined, to control and regulation by California Public Utilities Commission. Imposes restrictions on electricity customers' ability to switch from private utilities to other electric providers. Provides that registration by electric service providers with Commission constitutes providers' consent to regulation. Requires all retail electric sellers, instead of just private utilities, to increase renewable energy resource procurement by at least 1% each year, with 20% of retail sales procured from renewable energy by 2010, instead of current requirement of 2017. Imposes duties on Commission, Legislature and electrical providers.

==== Opinion Polls ====
Source	Yes	No	Undecided	Spread
Field Poll (8/19-29)	33%	35%	32%	NO +2

==== Results ====
Option	Vote Count	Percentage
Yes	2,189,126	34.3%
No	4,182,374	65.7%

Proposition 80 results by county No: 70–80%; 60–70%; 50–60%; Yes: 50–60%
