= 2008 California Proposition 6 =

California Proposition 6, also known as the Safe Neighborhoods Act and The Runner Initiative, is a statutory initiative that appeared on the November 2008 ballot in California. This proposition was rejected by voters on November 4 of that year.

Proposition 6 would have placed additional penalties on gang related and drug crime.

== Provisions of Prop 6 ==
Proposition 6 would:

- Require new state spending on various criminal justice programs, as well as for increased costs for prison and parole operations. This funding is equivalent to 0.3% of California's General Fund.
- Authorize prosecution as an adult (rather than in juvenile court, if a juvenile court judge consents) of any youth 14 years old or older who has been convicted of a gang-related felony.
- Require that all occupants who are recipients of public housing subsidies submit to annual criminal background checks and lose housing if convicted of a recent crime in order to free up housing for non-criminals.
- Increase penalties for several crimes, including violating gang injunctions, using or possessing to sell methamphetamine, or carrying loaded or concealed firearms by certain felons.
- Eliminate bail for illegal immigrants charged with violent or gang-related felonies.
- Establish as a crime the act of removing or disabling a monitoring device affixed as part of a criminal sentence.
- Change evidence rules to allow use of certain hearsay statements as evidence when witnesses are made unavailable due to actions by the defendant.
- Requires a 3/4 vote to amend.

=== Estimated fiscal impact ===
The California Legislative Analyst's Office has arrived at the following summary of Prop. 6's estimated costs:

- Net state costs likely to exceed a half billion dollars annually primarily for increased funding of criminal justice programs, as well as for increased costs for prison and parole operations.
- Unknown one-time state capital outlay costs potentially exceeding a half billion dollars for prison facilities.
- Unknown net fiscal impact for state trial courts, county jails, and other local criminal justice agencies.

Funds to pay for these costs, should Prop. 6 pass, will come from 0.3% of California's general fund.

In the current California state budget, $600 million (0.6%) is set aside to assist with local law enforcement. If the initiative passes, an additional $350 million (0.3%) will be required to enforce some of its provisions.

== Authors of Prop. 6 ==
- Three-Strikes Law Author Mike Reynolds
- San Bernardino County Supervisor Gary Ovitt
- California State Senator George Runner

== Supporters of Prop. 6 ==
The name of the official campaign committee supporting Proposition 6 is the Committee to Take Back Our Neighborhoods.

- Will Smith (not to be confused with the actor of the same name)
- National Tax Limitation Committee
- Crime Victims United
- Crime Victims Action Alliance
- Patricia Wenskunas, Founder, Crime Survivors, Inc.
- Angie Vargas, Mothers Taking Action Against Gang Violence
- The California State Sheriffs Association
- The California District Attorneys Association
- The Association for Los Angeles Deputy Sheriffs
- The Peace Officers Research Association of California
- Los Angeles Police Protective League
- All 58 Sheriffs in California

=== Arguments in favor of Prop. 6 ===
- Creates tougher punishment for gang crimes, drive-by shootings, meth distribution and victim intimidation
- Creates more effective and accountable intervention programs to stop young kids from joining gangs.
- Helps victims who have been intimidated by gang criminals
- It provides additional funds for victim-witness protection programs.
- Prohibits bail for illegal aliens who are charged with violent or gang crimes.
- Ensures additional funding for local police, sheriff, district attorneys and probation officers.

=== Radio ads ===
- Excerpt of Radio Ad from the Committee to Take Back Our Neighborhoods
- Radio Ad from the Peace Officers Research Association of California

=== Path to the ballot ===
The petition drive to place the measure on the ballot was conducted by National Petition Management, at a cost of $1.022 million.

Supporters turned in over 750,000 signatures on April 25 to qualify the measure for the November 2008 ballot, and the measure was subsequently approved for the ballot.,

=== Donors who support Prop. 6 ===
As of July 14, 2008, eight of the largest donors to Prop. 6 included:

- Henry Nicholas, $1,000,000
- Larry Rasmussen, $200,000
- Taxpayers for George Runner and George Runner for Senate 2008, together, $89,000
- Committee to Elect Gary Ovitt, $50,000
- The Golden State Bail Agents Association for Public Safety, $40,000
- California Association of Healthcare Underwriters, $35,000
- The Pechanga Band of Mission Indians, $25,000
- The Peace Officer Research Association, $25,000

Nicholas, who was arraigned on June 16, 2008 and pleaded not guilty on charges that included drug use, security fraud and conspiracy and has withdrawn from active support of the initiative, though the campaign has stated they will not return his $1,000,000 contribution. Ironically he is also charged with possession of methamphetamine with intent to distribute, meaning he himself would receive the tougher penalties of this initiative.

== Opposition to Prop. 6 ==
The official committee opposing Proposition 6 is known as No on Propositions 6 & 9, Communities for Safe Neighborhoods and Fiscal Responsibility.

- California Democratic Party
- The California Professional Firefighters,
- The California Labor Federation,
- Former Los Angeles Police Chief Bernard Parks,
- The California Teachers Association,
- The California National Organization for Women,
- The Los Angeles City Council,
- The League of Women Voters,
- California Church IMPACT
- The Ella Baker Center for Human Rights.

=== Arguments against Prop. 6 ===
- It diverts billions from California's schools, hospitals and childcare centers by funding failed prison and policing policies, deepening the state's ongoing budget crisis.
- It targets youth for adult incarceration by deeming any youth 14 years or older who is convicted of a "gang-related" felony must be tried as an adult.
- It targets poor people by requiring recipients of public housing subsidies to submit to annual criminal background checks and withdrawing the housing subsidies of people with recent criminal convictions.
- It targets illegal aliens by denying bail to those that are charged with violent or gang-related crimes and requires local sheriffs to inform Immigration and Customs Enforcement (ICE) of the arrests.
- Individuals who are not affiliated with gangs are listed in gang databases and may be falsely prosecuted under this provision.

=== Donors who oppose Prop. 6 ===
The name of the official campaign committee opposing Prop. 6 is No on Propositions 6 & 9, Communities for Safe Neighborhoods.

As of September 5, 2008, the five largest donors against Prop. 6 consisted of the Ella Baker Center and four labor unions:

- California Teachers Association (Labor Union), $72,805
- California State Council of Service Employees (Service Employees International Union) (Labor Union), $47,805
- California Federation of Teachers (Labor Union), $25,000
- Ella Baker Center, $25,000
- California Professional Firefighters (Labor Union), $1,950

== Newspaper endorsements ==
=== Editorial boards opposed ===
- Los Angeles Times

== Results ==
Electoral results by county.

Proposition 6
Choice	Votes	%
For	3,824,372	30.88
Against	8,559,647	69.12
Total	12,384,019	100.00
Valid votes	12,384,019	90.11
Invalid/blank votes	1,359,158	9.89
Total votes	13,743,177	100.00
Registered voters/turnout		79.42

=== Basic information ===
- California Voter's Guide for Proposition 6
- Official language
- Smart Voter Guide to Proposition 6
- California Voter Online guide to Proposition 6
