= 2009 California Proposition 1A =

Failed California ballot measure

Proposition 1A was a defeated California ballot proposition that appeared on the May 19, 2009 special election ballot. It was a constitutional amendment that would have increased the annual contributions to the state's rainy day fund. The proposition was legislatively referred to voters by the State Legislature.

== Background ==
In February 2009 the State Legislature narrowly passed the 2009–2010 state budget during a special session. As part of the plan to lower the state's annual deficits, the State Legislature ordered a special election with various budget reform ballot propositions, among them Proposition 1A.

The proposition was part of Assembly Constitutional Amendment 1 (Third Extraordinary Session), which was authored by Republican assemblymen Roger Niello of Fair Oaks and Anthony Adams of Hesperia. The amendment passed in the State Assembly by a vote of 74 to 6 and in the State Senate by a vote of 30 to 8.

== Proposal ==
Proposition 1A would have increased the target size of the state's rainy day fund from 5% to 12.5% of the General Fund (the state's chief operating fund). The proposition also established a way of determining which extra revenues to contribute to the rainy day fund (officially the Budget Stabilization Account, however Proposition 1A would have changed the name of the fund to the Budget Stabilization Fund). Extra revenues would first be used to meet constitutionally mandated education funding obligations and the remainder would be deposited in the rainy day fund. Once the target size was reached, any other revenues would have been used to pay off Economic Recovery Bonds established by Proposition 57 in 2004. Once these obligations were made any further unexpected revenues could be used on other projects.

If Proposition 1B also passed, then 1.5% of revenues would be subtracted from the rainy day fund annually until $9.3 billion was paid to public education.

The State Legislature passed a different bill that included tax increases with the 2009–2010 budget. That bill had a provision that stated if Proposition 1A passed, the tax increases would continue for another two years.

== Results ==
Electoral results by county

Proposition 1A
Choice	Votes	%
For	1,668,216	34.61
Against	3,152,141	65.39
Total	4,820,357	100.00
Valid votes	4,820,357	98.94
Invalid/blank votes	51,588	1.06
Total votes	4,871,945	100.00
Registered voters/turnout	17,153,012	28.40
