= California's congressional districts =

U.S. House districts in the state of California

Map of California's congressional districts from 2023 until 2027 Interactive map version

Passed map under California Proposition 50 (effective 2027–2033 starting with the 2026 elections) Interactive map version

California is the most populous U.S. state; as a result, it has the most representation in the United States House of Representatives, with 52 Representatives. Each Representative represents one congressional district.

Per the 2020 United States census, California lost a congressional seat which it had gained after the 2000 census, reducing its total seats from 53 to 52 starting from the 2022 elections and its subsequent 118th Congress. This marked the first time in the state's history where it lost a seat.

== Current districts and representatives ==
This is a list of United States representatives from California, their terms in office, district boundaries, and their political ratings according to the CPVI. The delegation for the 119th Congress had a total of 52 members, with 43 Democrats and 8 Republicans, and one independent.

Current U.S. representatives from California
District	Member (Residence)	Party	Incumbent since	CPVI (2026)	District map
1st	James Gallagher (East Nicolaus)	Republican	June 2, 2026	D+7	
2nd	Jared Huffman (San Rafael)	Democratic	January 3, 2013	D+13	
3rd	Kevin Kiley (Roseville)	Independent	January 3, 2023	D+6	
4th	Mike Thompson (St. Helena)	Democratic	January 3, 1999	D+8	
5th	Tom McClintock (Elk Grove)	Republican	January 3, 2009	R+10	
6th	Ami Bera (Elk Grove)	Democratic	January 3, 2013	D+5	
7th	Doris Matsui (Sacramento)	Democratic	March 10, 2005	D+7	
8th	John Garamendi (Walnut Grove)	Democratic	November 5, 2009	D+19	
9th	Josh Harder (Tracy)	Democratic	January 3, 2019	D+8	
10th	Mark DeSaulnier (Concord)	Democratic	January 3, 2015	D+18	
11th	Nancy Pelosi (San Francisco)	Democratic	June 2, 1987	D+36	
12th	Lateefah Simon (Emeryville)	Democratic	January 3, 2025	D+39	
13th	Adam Gray (Merced)	Democratic	January 3, 2025	D+2	
14th	Aisha Wahab (Hayward)	Democratic	August 18, 2026	D+19	
15th	Kevin Mullin (South San Francisco)	Democratic	January 3, 2023	D+26	
16th	Sam Liccardo (San Jose)	Democratic	January 3, 2025	D+25	
17th	Ro Khanna (Fremont)	Democratic	January 3, 2017	D+21	
18th	Zoe Lofgren (San Jose)	Democratic	January 3, 1995	D+16	
19th	Jimmy Panetta (Carmel Valley)	Democratic	January 3, 2017	D+18	
20th	Vince Fong (Bakersfield)	Republican	May 21, 2024	R+16	
21st	Jim Costa (Fresno)	Democratic	January 3, 2005	D+5	
22nd	David Valadao (Hanford)	Republican	January 3, 2021	D+1	
23rd	Jay Obernolte (Big Bear Lake)	Republican	January 3, 2021	R+9	
24th	Salud Carbajal (Santa Barbara)	Democratic	January 3, 2017	D+13	
25th	Raul Ruiz (Indio)	Democratic	January 3, 2013	D+4	
26th	Julia Brownley (Westlake Village)	Democratic	January 3, 2013	D+9	
27th	George T. Whitesides (Agua Dulce)	Democratic	January 3, 2025	D+6	
28th	Judy Chu (Monterey Park)	Democratic	July 14, 2009	D+14	
29th	Luz Rivas (Los Angeles)	Democratic	January 3, 2025	D+19	
30th	Laura Friedman (Glendale)	Democratic	January 3, 2025	D+21	
31st	Gil Cisneros (Covina)	Democratic	January 3, 2025	D+8	
32nd	Brad Sherman (Los Angeles)	Democratic	January 3, 1997	D+14	
33rd	Pete Aguilar (Redlands)	Democratic	January 3, 2015	D+7	
34th	Jimmy Gomez (Los Angeles)	Democratic	July 11, 2017	D+28	
35th	Norma Torres (Pomona)	Democratic	January 3, 2015	D+6	
36th	Ted Lieu (Torrance)	Democratic	January 3, 2015	D+21	
37th	Sydney Kamlager-Dove (Los Angeles)	Democratic	January 3, 2023	D+33	
38th	Linda Sánchez (Whittier)	Democratic	January 3, 2003	D+8	
39th	Mark Takano (Riverside)	Democratic	January 3, 2013	D+7	
40th	Young Kim (Anaheim Hills)	Republican	January 3, 2021	R+6	
41st	Ken Calvert (Corona)	Republican	January 3, 1993	D+9	
42nd	Robert Garcia (Long Beach)	Democratic	January 3, 2023	D+8	
43rd	Maxine Waters (Los Angeles)	Democratic	January 3, 1991	D+27	
44th	Nanette Barragán (Los Angeles)	Democratic	January 3, 2017	D+20	
45th	Derek Tran (Orange)	Democratic	January 3, 2025	D+3	
46th	Lou Correa (Santa Ana)	Democratic	January 3, 2017	D+10	
47th	Dave Min (Irvine)	Democratic	January 3, 2025	D+6	
48th	Darrell Issa (Bonsall)	Republican	January 3, 2021	D+2	
49th	Mike Levin (San Juan Capistrano)	Democratic	January 3, 2019	D+7	
50th	Scott Peters (San Diego)	Democratic	January 3, 2013	D+10	
51st	Sara Jacobs (San Diego)	Democratic	January 3, 2021	D+10	
52nd	Juan Vargas (San Diego)	Democratic	January 3, 2013	D+11	

== Historical district boundaries ==
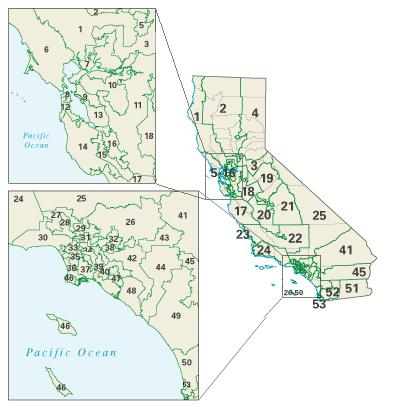
Districts from 2003 to 2013

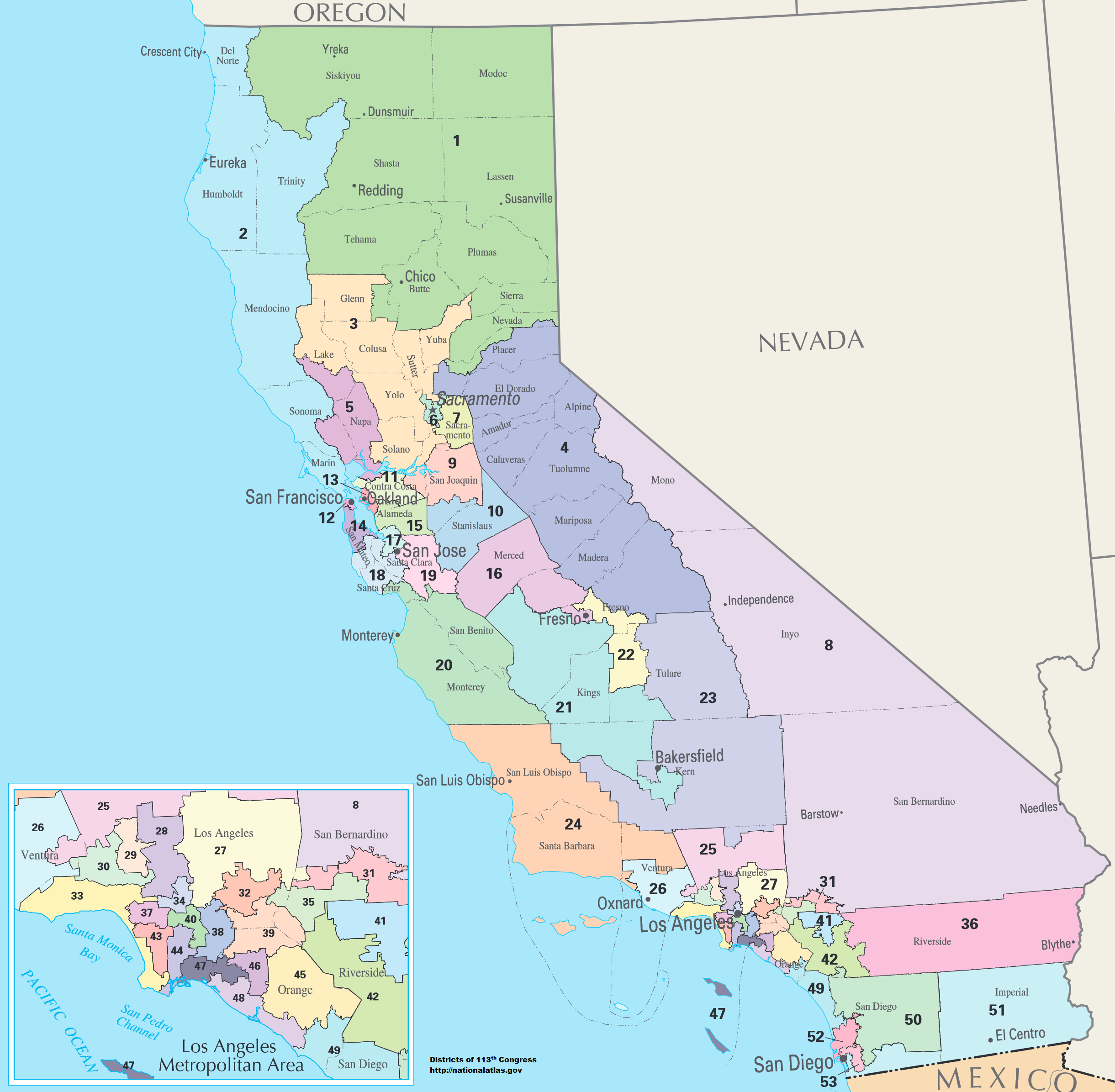
Districts from 2013 to 2023

== Redistricting ==
=== 1992 court-ordered districting ===
The 1990 census gave California seven additional congressional seats. Legislative attempts to draw new districts failed, as Republican governor Pete Wilson vetoed all three plans made by the Democratic-controlled state legislature. In September 1991, the Supreme Court of California took over the redistricting process to break the stalemate and, under its direction, a panel of retired judges determined the boundaries of the new districts.

=== 2002 bipartisan redistricting ===
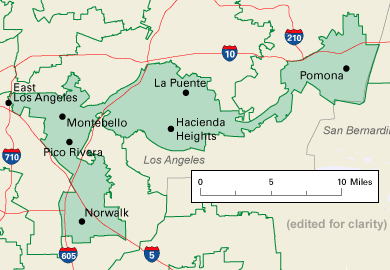
California's 38th congressional district, 2003-2013

After the 2000 census, the California State Legislature was obliged to complete redistricting (Note: The word "gerrymandering" is replaced with redistricting as the word "gerrymandering" refers, by definition, to the redrawing of districts to the advantage of a single party or for partisan gain.) for House of Representatives districts (in accordance with Article 1, Section 4 of the United States Constitution) as well as California State Assembly and California State Senate districts. It was mutually decided by legislators that the status quo in terms of balance of power would be preserved - a so-called Incumbent Protection Plan. A bipartisan gerrymandering effort was done, and districts were configured in such a way that they were dominated by one or the other party, with few districts that could be considered competitive. In some cases this resulted in extremely convoluted boundary lines.

In the 2004 elections, a win by less than 55 percent of the vote was quite rare. This was seen in only five out of 80 State Assembly seats and two out of 20 State Senate seats up for election. The congressional seats were even less competitive than the state legislative districts - just three of the 53 districts were won with less than 60 percent of the vote in 2004.

=== Citizens Redistricting Commission ===
==== 2012 ====
Proposition 11, a California ballot proposition known as the Voters FIRST Act, was approved by the voters on November 4, 2008. It removed from the California Legislature the responsibility for drawing the state's congressional districts, and gave the responsibility instead to a 14-member Citizens Commission. The U.S. Supreme Court upheld the constitutionality of removing the responsibility from the legislature. The proposition also required that the districts drawn up (1) comply with the federal Voting Rights Act; (2) make districts contiguous; (3) respect, to the extent possible, the integrity of cities, counties, neighborhoods and "communities of interest"; and (4) to the extent possible, make districts compact. Several of these terms are not defined in law.

Governor Arnold Schwarzenegger had earlier proposed placing the redistricting process in the hands of retired judges, which was on the November ballot as an initiative in a special election (called by the Governor on June 14, 2005), Proposition 77. The special election was held on November 8, 2005. However, the initiative was overwhelmingly defeated, with 59 percent voting no. All initiatives, including those proposed by the Governor's allies and several independent initiatives, failed that year.

The California Citizens Redistricting Commission certified final district maps on August 15, 2011, and they took effect with the 2012 election. The new districts are described as more "purple" than "red" or "blue" - that is, more mixed in electoral composition compared to the mostly "safe" districts of the previous decade, where incumbents were almost guaranteed re-election. These new districts, combined with demographic trends over several decades that favored the Democratic party, resulted in a gain of four House of Representatives seats for California Democrats in the 2012 elections.

==== 2022 ====
The 14-member Commission for 2020 is made up of five Republicans, five Democrats, and four members who are not affiliated with either party. Initial and supplemental applications were forwarded to a review panel consisting of three independent auditors from the CA State Auditor. This panel selected 120 of the "most qualified applicants", who were then personally interviewed and divided into three equal sub-pools according to party affiliation, and then narrowed down to 60 applicants.

The review panel presented those 60 applicants to the California State Legislature, where leadership had the option of removing up to 24 names from the list, eight from each sub-pool. The names of the remaining applicants were submitted to the California State Auditor, who randomly drew three Democrats, three Republicans, and two from neither of those parties. These eight individuals became the first eight members of the commission, and they selected the remaining six members by selecting two commissioners from each of the three sub-pools.

The commission received the official 2020 U.S. census data on which the maps must be based, by law, on September 21, 2021. Draft maps were released then on November 21, and final maps were submitted to the California Secretary of State on December 27, 2021. The new districts are considered "enacted" as of December 27, 2021. However, there was a 90-day period for a referendum petition to be filed to prevent the maps from becoming effective. This referendum period ended on March 27, 2022, when the filing and campaign season for the 2022 primary election was already underway. Even after becoming effective, the newly redrawn districts did not become official until the 2022 primary and general elections, and the new districts did not actually exist until after the 2022 general election was complete. Starting from the 2023 inaugurations, the existing boundaries and elected representatives are as shown above.

=== Proposition 50 (2025) ===
In 2025, Proposition 50 was passed by the California voters. The proposition amends the California state constitution to temporarily redraw the state's congressional districts from 2026–2030, as a Democratic gerrymander intended to offset the gerrymander by Texas Republicans. Following the 2030 census, congressional redistricting authority will return to the independent commission under the normal decennial process.

== See also ==
- Districts in California
- List of United States congressional districts
