= Decline to State =

No-party (independent) designation in California voting registration

Decline to State (DTS) was an affiliation designation on the California voter registration form that allows voters to register to vote without choosing a party affiliation. It is similar to what in other states would be called declaring oneself as an independent. As of October 19, 2020, 23.97% of California's registered voters have "no party preference".

In February 1999, 13% of registered voters in California declined to state a party affiliation. That figure had risen to 18% by January 2006, and to 20% by October 2008. The growth of the category Decline to State follows California's switch from the closed primary to an open primary system in 1996 following the adoption of Proposition 198. Until 1996, only voters who were registered with a political party could vote in that party's primary election. In the June 1998 and March 2000 primary elections, voters could vote for any candidate in any party's primary.

On June 26, 2000, the United States Supreme Court decided in California Democratic Party, et al. v. Jones 530 U.S. 567 (2000) that California's open primary system violated the right of free association. In January 2001, following the passage of SB28 (Ch. 898, Stats. 2000), a new modified closed system took effect in which voters registered with a particular party can only vote in that party's primary, but voters who decline to state a party affiliation can vote in one party's primary if the party agrees to allow it (California Elections Code §2151).

The Democratic and Republican parties had both allowed voters who decline to state a party affiliation to vote in all of their respective primary elections until the 2008 presidential primary election, in which the Republican party disallowed the practice.

== See also ==
- Independent politician
- Independent voter
- None of the above
