= 2004 California Proposition 65 =

Referendum on government revenue

Proposition 65 was a California ballot proposition on the November 2, 2004 ballot. It failed to pass with 3,901,748 (37.6%) votes in favor and 6,471,506 (62.4%) against. It was a state constitutional amendment that would have required voter approval for any state legislation reducing certain local government revenues from January 2003 levels. It was officially known as the Local Taxpayers and Public Safety Protection Act.

Local governments (cities and counties) in California primarily receive their revenue from three sources: property taxes, local sales taxes, and the vehicle license fees. Proposition 65 was born out of frustration from local governments as the California state government increasingly used local revenues to pay for state government programs, especially during tough financial times.

Proponents of the proposition ultimately used it as a bargaining tool to negotiate an agreement with Governor Arnold Schwarzenegger and the California State Legislature on protecting local government revenues. The result was the compromise Proposition 1A on the same ballot, which provided more flexible terms and deferred its restrictions until 2006. As a result, previous proponents of Proposition 65 dropped their support in favor of Proposition 1A.

This proposition conflicted with the provisions of Proposition 1A on the same ballot. The California Constitution provides that if the provisions of two approved propositions are in conflict, only the provisions of the measure with the higher number of "yes" votes at the statewide election take effect. (Since Prop 65 did not pass, the issue was moot.)

Proposition 65 results by county No: 60–70%; 50–60%

== Official summary ==
- Requires voter approval for any legislation that provides for any reduction, based on January 1, 2003, levels, of local governments' vehicle license fee revenues, sales tax powers and revenues, and proportionate share of local property tax revenues.
- Permits local government to suspend performance of state mandate if state fails to reimburse local government within 180 days of final determination of state-mandated obligation; except mandates requiring local government to provide/modify: any protection, benefit or employment status to employee/retiree, or any procedural/substantive employment right for employee or employee organization.

Summary of Legislative Analyst's Estimate of Net State and Local Government Fiscal Impact:

- Significant changes to state authority over local finances. Higher local government revenues than otherwise would have been the case, possibly in the billions of dollars annually over time. Any such local revenue impacts would result in decreased resources to the state of similar amounts.
