= 2004 California Proposition 60A =

Referendum on sales of government property

Proposition 60A was an amendment of the Constitution of California, enacted in 2004, relating to funds from the sale of government property. It was proposed by the California Legislature and approved by the voters in a referendum held as part of the November 2004 election, by a majority of 73%.

Proposition 60A results by county Yes: 80–90%; 70–80%; 60–70%

== Provisions ==
The law directed funds collected from the sale of surplus government property toward repaying the $15 billion in bonds authorized by the passage of Proposition 57 in March 2004. The official summary of the proposition reads:

Dedicates proceeds from sale of surplus state property purchased with General Fund monies to payment of principal, interest on Economic Recovery Bonds approved in March 2004. When those bonds are repaid, surplus property sales proceeds directed to Special Fund For Economic Uncertainties.

To do this the amendment added to the state constitution Article III, Section 9, stating that

The proceeds from the sale of surplus state property occurring on or after the effective date of this section, and any proceeds from the previous sale of surplus state property that have not been expended or encumbered as of that date, shall be used to pay the principal and interest on bonds issued pursuant to the Economic Recovery Bond Act authorized at the March 2, 2004, statewide primary election. Once the principal and interest on those bonds are fully paid, the proceeds from the sale of surplus state property shall be deposited into the Special Fund for Economic Uncertainties, or any successor fund. For purposes of this section, surplus state property does not include property purchased with revenues described in Article XIX or any other special fund moneys.

The Summary of Legislative Analyst's Estimate of Net State and Local Government Fiscal Impact predicted "Net savings over the longer term-potentially low. Tens of millions of dollars-from accelerated repayment of existing bonds".

== Process of enactment ==
In 2004 the state legislature proposed a constitutional amendment called Senate Constitutional Amendment 18. This contained provisions relating to both primary elections and funds from the sale of government property. This was to be put to voters as a single measure called Proposition 60. However Californians for an Open Primary challenged the measure as a violation of the rule that ballot propositions must deal with only a single subject. The group wished to have Proposition 60 removed from the ballot. Instead, in Californians for an Open Primary v. Shelley, the Third District Court of Appeals ordered that the proposition be split, so that the provisions relating to government property would become a separate measure, called Proposition 60A.

Senate Constitutional Amendment 18 (which included the provisions that would become Proposition 60A) was approved by the California Assembly by a vote of 55-21 and by the State Senate by a vote of 28–3. On November 2, 2004, it was approved by the electorate with 7,776,374 (73.3%) votes in favor and 2,843,435 (26.7%) against.
