= 2002 California Proposition 52 =

Proposition 52
- November 5, 2002
- Election Day Voter Registration

Results
Choice	Votes	%
Yes	2,888,207	40.94%
No	4,166,035	59.06%
Total votes	7,054,242	100.00%
- Results by county

Proposition 52 was a California ballot proposition on the November 5, 2002 ballot. It failed to pass with 2,808,240 (40.6%) votes in favor and 4,108,362 (59.4%) against. It would allow Election Day voter registration, removing the deadline to register to vote, which was 15 days prior to an election. It was placed on the ballot through the initiative process.

The question before voters was:

Should legally eligible California residents presenting proof of current residence be allowed to register to vote on Election Day?

== Official summary ==
- Allows persons who are legally eligible to vote and have valid identification to register to vote on election day at their polling place.
- Increases criminal penalty for voter and voter registration fraud.
- Criminalizes conspiracy to commit voter fraud.
- Requires trained staff at polling places to manage election day registration, creates fund to implement measure, including training and providing personnel for election day registration.
- Allows persons to register or reregister during 28 days preceding election day at local election offices.
- Provides more time to county election officials to prepare voter registration lists.

Summary of Legislative Analyst's Estimate of Net State and Local Government Fiscal Impact:

- Annual state costs of about $6 million to fund counties for election day voter registration activities, thereby resulting in no anticipated net county cost.
- Minor state administrative costs and unknown, but probably minor, state costs to enforce a new election fraud offense.
