= 2004 California Proposition 1A =

Referendum on local and state funding

Proposition 1A was a California ballot proposition on the November 2, 2004 ballot. The proposition passed with 9,411,198 (83.7%) votes in favor and 1,840,002 (16.3%) against.

The proposition is intended to protect revenues collected by local governments (cities, counties, and special districts) from being transferred to the California state government for statewide use. The provisions may be suspended if the governor declares a fiscal necessity and two-thirds of the California State Legislature approve the suspension. It did not take effect until 2006.

Proposition 1A was added to the ballot by the California Legislature as a state-sponsored compromise to take the place of the initiative-drawn Proposition 65 on the same ballot. It was passed by the California Assembly by a vote of 64–13. It was approved by the California State Senate by a vote of 34–5. Proponents of Prop 65 negotiated with state officials to draw up the provisions of Proposition 1A. The former proponents then dropped their support for 65 in favor of 1A.

== Official summary ==
- Protects local funding for public safety, health, libraries, parks, and other locally delivered services.
- Prohibits the State from reducing local governments' property tax proceeds.
- Allows the provisions to be suspended only if the Governor declares a fiscal necessity and two-thirds of the Legislature approve the suspension. Suspended funds must be repaid within three years.
- Also requires local sales tax revenues to remain with local government and be spent for local purposes.
- Requires the State to fund legislative mandates on local governments or suspend their operation.

== Results ==
Proposition 1A – Protection of Local Government Revenues
Choice	Votes	%
For	9,411,198	83.65
Against	1,840,002	16.35
Total	11,251,200	100.00
Valid votes	11,251,200	89.37
Invalid/blank votes	1,338,483	10.63
Total votes	12,589,683	100.00

Proposition 1A results by county Yes: 80–90%; 70–80%

== Impact ==
The passing of California Proposition 1A resulted in significant changes to state authority over local finances:

- Higher local government revenues than otherwise would have been the case, possibly in the billions of dollars annually over time.
- Any such local revenue impacts would result in decreased resources to the state of similar amounts.

== See also ==
- List of California ballot propositions
