= 2004 California Proposition 61 =

Referendum funding children's hospitals

Proposition 61 was a California ballot proposition on the November 2, 2004 ballot. It passed with 6,629,095 (58.3%) votes in favor and 4,750,309 (41.7%) against. The proposition was the result of an initiative and authorized the sale of $750 million in bonds to provide funding for children's hospitals. It was officially known as the Children's Hospital Bond Act of 2004.

Proposition 61 results by county Yes: 70–80%; 60–70%; 50–60%; No: 60–70%; 50–60%

== Official summary ==
- Authorizes $750,000,000 in general obligation bonds, to be repaid from state's General Fund, for grants to eligible children's hospitals for construction, expansion, remodeling, renovation, furnishing and equipping children's hospitals.
- 20% of bonds are for grants to specified University of California general acute care hospitals; 80% of bonds are for grants to general acute care hospitals that focus on children with illnesses such as leukemia, heart defects, sickle cell anemia and cystic fibrosis, provide comprehensive services to a high volume of children eligible for government programs, and that meet other stated requirements.

Summary of Legislative Analyst's Estimate of Net State and Local Government Fiscal Impact:

- State cost of about $1.5 billion over 30 years to pay off both the principal ($750 million) and the interest ($756 million) costs of the bonds. Payments of about $50 million per year.
