= 2004 California Proposition 60 =

Referendum on ballot access

Proposition 60
- Election Rights of Political Parties

Results
Choice	Votes	%
Yes	7,227,433	67.51%
No	3,478,774	32.49%
Valid votes	10,706,207	100.00%
Invalid or blank votes	0	0.00%
Total votes	10,706,207	100.00%
Registered voters/turnout	12,589,683	85.04%
- County results Yes: 70–80% 60–70% 50–60%

Proposition 60 was an amendment of the Constitution of California, enacted in 2004, guaranteeing the right of a party participating in a primary election to also participate in the general election that follows. It was proposed by the California Legislature and approved by the voters in referendum held as part of the November 2004 election, by a majority of 67%.

== Provisions ==
Proposition 60 related to partisan primary elections for statewide offices, as well as races for the state legislature, and the State Board of Equalization. It added to the state constitution Article II, Section 5 (b), stating that

A political party that participated in a primary election for a partisan office has the right to participate in the general election for that office and shall not be denied the ability to place on the general election ballot the candidate who received, at the primary election, the highest vote among that party’s candidates.

The official summary of the proposition stated

Provides the right for political party participating in a primary election for partisan office to also participate in the general election for that office. Candidate receiving most votes from among that party's candidates in primary election for state partisan office cannot be denied placement on general election ballot.

It was declared by the Legislative Analyst to have "no fiscal effect".

== Process of enactment ==
In 2004 the state legislature proposed a constitutional amendment called Senate Constitutional Amendment 18. This contained provisions relating to both primary elections and funds from the sale of government property. This was to be put to voters as a single measure called Proposition 60. However Californians for an Open Primary challenged the measure as a violation of the rule that ballot propositions must deal with only a single subject. The group wished to have Proposition 60 removed from the ballot. Instead, in Californians for an Open Primary v. Shelley, the Third District Court of Appeals ordered that the proposition be split, so that the provisions relating to government property would become a separate measure, called Proposition 60A.

Proposition 60 (including the provisions later excised) was approved by the California State Senate by a vote of 28-3 and by the State Assembly by a by 55–21. On November 2, 2004, it was approved by voters by a majority of 5,806,708 (67.3%) "Yes" votes, to 2,829,284 (32.7%) "No" votes. Proposition 60A was also approved by voters.
