= February 2008 California elections =

- February 5, 2008

Elections were held in California on February 5, 2008. Presidential primaries and a special election for a State Assembly seat were among the contests held. Seven ballot propositions were also decided on.

== Presidential primaries ==
Key:	Withdrew prior to contest

=== American Independent presidential primary ===
Three candidates were on the ballot of the American Independent Party, a state political party.

California American Independence presidential primary, 2008
Candidate	Votes	Percentage
Donald Grundmann	16,603	36.08%
Diane Templin	15,302	33.25%
Mad Max Riekse	14,099	30.64%
David Larson (write-in)	18	0.04%
Totals	46,022	100.00%
Voter turnout^{[A]}	—	

=== Democratic presidential primary ===
California Democratic presidential primary, 2008
Candidate	Votes	Percentage	National delegates
Hillary Clinton	2,608,184	51.47%	204
Barack Obama	2,186,662	43.16%	166
John Edwards	193,617	3.82%	0
Dennis Kucinich	24,126	0.48%	0
Bill Richardson	19,939	0.39%	0
Joe Biden	18,261	0.36%	0
Mike Gravel	8,184	0.16%	0
Christopher Dodd	8,005	0.16%	0
Willie Carter (write-in)	4	0.00%	0
Eric Hinzman (write-in)	4	0.00%	0
Phil Epstein (write-in)	3	0.00%	0
Brian Calef (write-in)	2	0.00%	0
David Frey (write-in)	1	0.00%	0
Joseph McAndrew (write-in)	1	0.00%	0
Keith Judd (write-in)	0	0.00%	0
Julius Mogyorossy (write-in)	0	0.00%	0
Totals	5,066,993	100.00%	370
Voter turnout^{[A]}	—		—

=== Green presidential primary ===
Seven candidates participated in the Green Party's presidential primary, which is a non-binding contest.

California Green presidential primary, 2008
Candidate	Votes	Percentage	National delegates
Ralph Nader	21,726	60.61%	102
Cynthia McKinney	9,534	26.60%	45
Elaine Brown	1,598	4.46%	7
Kat Swift	1,084	3.02%	5
Kent Mesplay	727	2.03%	3
Jesse Johnson	619	1.73%	3
Jared Ball	556	1.55%	3
Totals	35,844	100.00%	168
Voter turnout	28.21%		—

=== Libertarian presidential primary ===
California Libertarian presidential primary, 2008
Candidate	Votes	Percentage
Christine Smith	4,241	25.16%
Steve Kubby	2,876	17.06%
Wayne Root	2,360	14.00%
Bob Jackson	1,486	8.81%
Barry Hess	891	5.29%
George Phillies	852	5.05%
Michael Jingozian	774	4.59%
Robert Milnes	721	4.28%
Daniel Imperato	707	4.19%
John Finan	706	4.19%
Dave Hollist	678	4.02%
Alden Link	565	3.35%
Leon Ray (write-in)	1	0.01%
Totals	16,858	100.00%
Voter turnout	20.96%	

=== Peace and Freedom presidential primary ===
Seven candidates participated in the Peace and Freedom presidential primary, a non-binding "beauty contest". Ralph Nader received a plurality of the votes, followed by Gloria La Riva and Cynthia McKinney. Stewart Alexander was nominated to be Socialist Party candidate Brian Moore's running mate in October 2007, but remained on the Peace and Freedom ballot.

California Peace and Freedom presidential primary, 2008
Candidate	Votes	Percentage
Ralph Nader	2,620	40.66%
Cynthia McKinney	1,385	21.49%
Gloria La Riva	1,292	20.05%
Brian Moore	355	5.51%
John Crockford	346	5.37%
Stewart Alexander	340	5.28%
Stanley Hetz	106	1.64%
Totals	6,444	100.00%
Voter turnout	11.27%	

=== Republican presidential primary ===
California Republican presidential primary, 2008
Candidate	Votes	Percentage	National delegates
John McCain	1,238,988	42.25%	116
Mitt Romney	1,013,471	34.56%	3
Mike Huckabee	340,669	11.62%	0
Rudy Giuliani	128,681	4.39%	0
Ron Paul	125,365	4.27%	0
Fred Thompson	50,275	1.71%	0
Duncan Hunter	14,021	0.48%	0
Alan Keyes	11,742	0.40%	0
John Cox	3,219	0.11%	0
Tom Tancredo	3,884	0.13%	0
Sam Brownback	2,486	0.08%	0
Karen Irish (write-in)	6	0.00%	0
Michael Shaw (write-in)	2	0.00%	0
Edward Marshall (write-in)	1	0.00%	0
Joel Neuberg (write-in)	1	0.00%	0
Robert Brickell (write-in)	0	0.00%	0
Brian Calef (write-in)	0	0.00%	0
David Frey (write-in)	0	0.00%	0
Walter Rothnie (write-in)	0	0.00%	0
John Sutherland (write-in)	0	0.00%	0
Totals	2,932,811	100.00%	119
Voter turnout	56.08%		—

== Propositions ==
=== Proposition 91 ===

Proposition 91 sought to amend the California Constitution to prohibit motor vehicle fuel sales taxes that are earmarked for transportation purposes from being retained in the state's General Fund.

Proposition 91
Choice	Votes	%
For	3,427,588	41.69
Against	4,794,776	58.31
Total	8,222,364	100.00
Valid votes	8,222,364	90.67
Invalid/blank votes	846,051	9.33
Total votes	9,068,415	100.00
Registered voters/turnout		57.71

=== Proposition 92 ===

Proposition 92 sought to amend Proposition 98 of 1988, which sets a mandate for the minimum level of funding each year for elementary and secondary schools and community colleges.

Proposition 92
Choice	Votes	%
For	3,613,332	42.79
Against	4,831,445	57.21
Total	8,444,777	100.00
Valid votes	8,444,777	93.12
Invalid/blank votes	623,638	6.88
Total votes	9,068,415	100.00
Registered voters/turnout		57.71

=== Proposition 93 ===

Proposition 93 sought to change the term limits for members of the California State Legislature in both the State Assembly and State Senate.

Proposition 93
Choice	Votes	%
For	3,961,466	46.41
Against	4,574,826	53.59
Total	8,536,292	100.00
Valid votes	8,536,292	94.13
Invalid/blank votes	532,123	5.87
Total votes	9,068,415	100.00
Registered voters/turnout		57.71

=== Proposition 94 ===

Proposition 94 sought to expand the Indian Gaming Compact with the Pechanga Band of Luiseño Mission Indians.

Proposition 94
Choice	Votes	%
For	4,812,313	55.56
Against	3,848,998	44.44
Total	8,661,311	100.00
Valid votes	8,661,311	95.51
Invalid/blank votes	407,104	4.49
Total votes	9,068,415	100.00
Registered voters/turnout		57.71

=== Proposition 95 ===

Proposition 95 sought to expand the Indian Gaming Compact with the Morongo Band of Mission Indians.

Proposition 95
Choice	Votes	%
For	4,809,573	55.60
Against	3,841,352	44.40
Total	8,650,925	100.00
Valid votes	8,650,925	95.40
Invalid/blank votes	417,490	4.60
Total votes	9,068,415	100.00
Registered voters/turnout		57.71

=== Proposition 96 ===

Proposition 96 sought to expand the Indian Gaming Compact with the Sycuan Band of the Kumeyaay Nation.

Proposition 96
Choice	Votes	%
For	4,785,413	55.45
Against	3,844,408	44.55
Total	8,629,821	100.00
Valid votes	8,629,821	95.16
Invalid/blank votes	438,594	4.84
Total votes	9,068,415	100.00
Registered voters/turnout		57.71

=== Proposition 97 ===

Proposition 97 sought to expand the Indian Gaming Compact with the Agua Caliente Band of Cahuilla Indians.

Proposition 97
Choice	Votes	%
For	4,786,884	55.50
Against	3,838,892	44.50
Total	8,625,776	100.00
Valid votes	8,625,776	95.12
Invalid/blank votes	442,639	4.88
Total votes	9,068,415	100.00
Registered voters/turnout		57.71

== 55th State Assembly district special election ==
The seat of California's 55th State Assembly district was vacated by Assemblymember Laura Richardson, who won a special election to fill California's 37th congressional district on June 26, 2007. The congressional district was vacant after Juanita Millender-McDonald died of cancer on April 22, 2007.

=== Primary election ===
A primary election for the special election was held on December 11, 2007. Since no candidate won a majority, the candidates with the top votes for each party appeared on the ballots for the special election.

California's 55th State Assembly district special primary, 2007
Party	Candidate	Votes	%
Democratic	Warren Furutani	9,578	48.52
Democratic	Mike Gipson	7,602	38.51
Libertarian	Herb Peters	1,137	5.76
American Independent	Charlotte Gibson	776	3.93
Democratic	Mervin Evans	531	2.69
Valid ballots		19,624	99.41
Invalid or blank votes		116	0.59
Total votes		19,740	100.00
Turnout			11.56

=== Special election ===
California's 55th State Assembly district special election, 2008
Party	Candidate	Votes	%
Democratic	Warren Furutani	48,419	69.80
American Independent	Charlotte Gibson	10,785	15.55
Libertarian	Herb Peters	10,168	14.66
Valid ballots		69,372	79.80
Invalid or blank votes		17,670	20.30
Total votes		87,042	100.00
Turnout			50.96
Democratic hold			

== Notes ==
^{A} Voter turnout information is listed where applicable. Turnout information is not available for the American Independent or Democratic primaries because both parties allowed Decline to State voters to participate. There were a total of 328,261 eligible registered voters registered with the American Independent Party, 6,749,406 with the Democratic Party, and 3,043,164 who declined to state. There was a total of 15,712,753 eligible registered voters regardless of party affiliation in the entire state.

== See also ==
- Political party strength in California
- Political party strength in U.S. states
