= 2005 California Proposition 75 =

U.S. President
- 1852; 1856; 1860; 1864; 1868; 1872; 1876; 1880; 1884; 1888; 1892; 1896; 1900; 1904; 1908; 1912; 1916; 1920; 1924; 1928; 1932; 1936; 1940; 1944; 1948; 1952; 1956; 1960; 1964; 1968; 1972; 1976; 1980; 1984; 1988; 1992; 1996; 2000; 2004; 2008; 2012; 2016; 2020; 2024

Proposition 75 was a ballot proposition in the California special election, 2005.

== Summary (Prepared by the Attorney General) ==
Proposition 75: Public Employee Union Dues. Required Employee Consent for Political Contributions. Initiative Statute.

- Prohibits the use by public employee labor organizations of public employee dues or fees for political contributions except with the prior consent of individual public employees each year on a specified written form.
- Restriction does not apply to dues or fees collected for charitable organizations, health care insurance, or other purposes directly benefitting the public employee.
- Requires public employee labor organizations to maintain and submit records to Fair Political Practices Commission concerning individual public employees’ and organizations’ political contributions.
- These records are not subject to public disclosure.

Summary of Legislature Analyst's estimate of net state and local government fiscal impact:

- Probably minor state and local government implementation costs, potentially offset in part by revenues from fines and/or fees.

== Reaction ==
Opponents of this proposition portrayed it as a measure to "silence the unions," since private corporations would not be affected. They also cited a Supreme Court case in which union members could not be forced to join a union, and said that union members could already restrict their dues (opt-out process) towards political purposes.

The proponents cited this as a "Paycheck Protection" proposition, saying that this would help check union abuse.

The proposition was rejected on November 8, 2005 by 7% or about 500,000 votes statewide

SEIU's use of compulsory fees on nonmembers to fund its campaign against Prop. 75 was later found illegal by the U.S. Supreme Court in Knox v. Service Employees International Union, Local 1000. The Court was disturbed that "SEIU's procedure was to force many nonmembers to subsidize a political effort designed to restrict their own rights."

== Results ==
Proposition 75 results by county No: 70–80%; 60–70%; 50–60%; Yes: 60–70%; 50–60%
