= 2006 California Proposition 89 =

U.S. President
- 1852; 1856; 1860; 1864; 1868; 1872; 1876; 1880; 1884; 1888; 1892; 1896; 1900; 1904; 1908; 1912; 1916; 1920; 1924; 1928; 1932; 1936; 1940; 1944; 1948; 1952; 1956; 1960; 1964; 1968; 1972; 1976; 1980; 1984; 1988; 1992; 1996; Dem; Rep; 2000; Dem; Rep; 2004; Dem; Rep; 2008; Dem; Rep; 2012; Dem; Rep; 2016; Dem; Rep; 2020; Dem; Rep; 2024; Dem; Rep

Proposition 89 was a failed 2006 California ballot initiative that would have offered clean elections centered on campaign finance reform.

== Main points of Proposition 89 ==
- Would levy a 0.2% tax on all businesses to help pay for clean money elections
- Limits corporations to spending no more than $10,000 on initiatives
- Provides limited public funds for qualified candidates who agree to take no private money so they can serve their constituents free of obligation to the big donors.
- Bans contributions from lobbyists to politicians.
- Lawmakers can be removed from office or jailed for violating the policy, up to 5 years in jail and $25,000 fine.
- A YES vote on this measure means:

Candidates for state offices could choose to receive public funds to pay for the costs of campaigns if they meet certain requirements. Candidates not accepting public funds would be subject to lower contribution limits than currently. The tax rate on corporations and financial institutions would be increased to pay for the public financing of political campaigns.

- A NO vote on this measure means:

Candidates for state offices would continue to pay for their campaigns with private funds subject to current contribution limits. The tax rate on corporations and financial institutions would not change.

== Election results ==
The proposition was defeated in the November 2006 elections.

- Yes: 25.7% - 2,124,728
- No : 74.3% - 6,132,618

Proposition 89 results by county No: 80–90%; 70–80%; 60–70%; 50–60%; Yes: 50–60%

== See also ==
- Clean Elections

== External resources ==
- Yes on 89
- Analysis of Proposition 89
