= 2006 California Proposition 81 =

Failed referendum to fund libraries and literacy programs

U.S. President
- 1852; 1856; 1860; 1864; 1868; 1872; 1876; 1880; 1884; 1888; 1892; 1896; 1900; 1904; 1908; 1912; 1916; 1920; 1924; 1928; 1932; 1936; 1940; 1944; 1948; 1952; 1956; 1960; 1964; 1968; 1972; 1976; 1980; 1984; 1988; 1992; 1996; 2000; 2004; 2008; 2012; 2016; 2020; 2024

California Proposition 81 was a ballot initiative on the ballot for California voters in the primary election of June 6, 2006. As SB 1161, it passed through the Senate 28-9 and the Assembly 57–15. On the ballot, it did not pass, having received 1,873,147 (47%) votes in favor and 2,110,132 (53%) votes against.

== Text from the California Voter Information Guide ==
California Reading and Literacy Improvement and Public Library Construction and Renovation Bond Act of 2006.

=== Summary ===
This act provides for a bond issue in an amount not to exceed a total of six hundred million dollars ($600,000,000) to provide funds for the construction and renovation of public library facilities in order to expand access to reading and literacy programs in California's public education system and to expand access to public library services for all residents of California. Fiscal Impact: State cost of about $1.2 billion over 30 years to pay off both the principal ($600 million) and interest ($570 million) costs of the bonds. One-time local costs (statewide) of about $320 million for local matching contributions.

=== What Your Vote Means ===
A YES vote on this measure means: The state could sell $600 million in bonds to provide grants to local agencies for the construction, renovation, and/or expansion of local library facilities. Local agencies would contribute about $320 million of their own funds towards these projects.

A NO vote on this measure means: The state could not sell $600 million in bonds for these purposes.

Results by county: No: 50–60%; 60–70%; 70–80%; Yes: 50–60%; 60–70%
