= 2004 California Proposition 57 =

Budget referendum

U.S. President
- 1852; 1856; 1860; 1864; 1868; 1872; 1876; 1880; 1884; 1888; 1892; 1896; 1900; 1904; 1908; 1912; 1916; 1920; 1924; 1928; 1932; 1936; 1940; 1944; 1948; 1952; 1956; 1960; 1964; 1968; 1972; 1976; 1980; 1984; 1988; 1992; 1996; 2000; 2004; 2008; 2012; 2016; 2020; 2024

Proposition 57 (officially, the Economic Recovery Bond Act) was a California ballot proposition on the March 2, 2004 primary election ballot. It was passed with 4,056,313 (63.4%) votes in favor and 2,348,910 (36.6%) against. The proposition authorized the state to sell $15 billion in long-term bonds to pay off accumulated deficits. Proposition 57 went into effect only because Proposition 58 (the California Balanced Budget Act) also passed.

Propositions 57 and 58 were the centerpiece of Governor Arnold Schwarzenegger's plan to resolve California's budget problems. Schwarzenegger campaigned heavily for the passage of Propositions 57 and 58. California State Senator Tom McClintock, Schwarzenegger's fellow Republican and rival in the 2003 gubernatorial recall, was one of the chief opponents of Proposition 57.

The last payment of these deficit bonds was made Wednesday, August 5, 2015. Included in the payments made over the life of the bonds were payments into a state escrow account, where interest payments totaling $4.1 billion were put aside to be paid out through July 1, 2019. When the bonds were paid off, Schwarzenegger said, "I’m glad this chapter of California’s fiscal history is finally closed."

== Official summary ==
- A one time Economic Recovery Bond of up to fifteen billion dollars ($15,000,000,000) to pay off the state's accumulated General Fund deficit as of June 30, 2004.
- The Economic Recovery Bond will be issued only if the California Balanced Budget Act is also approved by the voters.
- The bonds will be secured by existing tax revenues and by other revenues that can be deposited in a special fund.

Summary of Legislative Analyst's Estimate of Net State and Local Government Fiscal Impact:

- One-time increase, compared to a previously authorized bond, of up to $4 billion to reduce the state's budget shortfall.
- Annual debt-service savings over the next few years.
- Above effects offset in subsequent years by higher annual debt-service costs due to this bond's larger size and the longer time period for its repayment.

Results by county: Yes: 50–60%; 60–70%; 70–80%; No: 50–60%
