= California Proposition 57 =

California Proposition 57 may refer to:

- California Proposition 57 (2004)
- California Proposition 57 (2016)
