= Proposition 57 =

Proposition 57 may refer to:

- 2004 California Proposition 57, the Economic Recovery Bond Act
- 2016 California Proposition 57, prison reform proposition
