= United States presidential elections in California =

Presidential elections in California

Presidential elections in California
- Number of elections: 44
- Voted Democratic: 20
- Voted Republican: 22
- Voted other: 2 (Note: Abraham Lincoln, 1864; Theodore Roosevelt, 1912.)
- Voted for winning candidate: 35
- Voted for losing candidate: 9

California Presidential Elections History

Since being admitted to the Union on September 9, 1850, California has participated in 43 presidential elections. A bellwether from 1888 to 1996, voting for the losing candidates only three times in that span, California has become a reliable state for Democratic presidential candidates since 1992.

== List ==
View source data.

Bold indicates the presidential candidate who won the national election.

Year	Winner					Runner-up					Other			TEV	Sources
Year	Candidate	Party	Votes	%	EV	Candidate	Party	Votes	%	EV	Votes	%	EV	TEV	Sources
1852	**Franklin Pierce**	Democratic	40,721	53.02%	4	Winfield Scott	Whig	35,972	46.83%	–	117	0.15%	–	4	
1856	**James Buchanan**	Democratic	53,342	48.38%	4	Millard Fillmore	Know Nothing	36,195	32.83%	–	20,718	18.79%	–	4	(Note: In 1856, Republican candidate John C. Frémont won 20,704 votes (18.78%) in California but did not receive an electoral vote from the state.)
1860	**Abraham Lincoln**	Republican	38,733	32.30%	4	Stephen A. Douglas	Democratic	37,999	31.70%	–	43,095	35.96%	–	4	(Note: In 1860, Southern Democratic candidate John C. Breckinridge won 33,969 votes (28.35%), and Constitutional Union candidate John Bell won 9,111 votes (7.60%) in California but neither received an electoral vote from the state.)
1864	**Abraham Lincoln**	National Union	62,053	58.60%	5	George B. McClellan	Democratic	43,837	41.40%	–	–	–	–	5	
1868	**Ulysses S. Grant**	Republican	54,588	50.20%	5	Horatio Seymour	Democratic	54,068	49.80%	–	–	–	–	5	
1872	**Ulysses S. Grant**	Republican	54,007	56.38%	6	Horace Greeley	Liberal Republican	40,717	42.51%	–	1,061	1.11%	–	6	
1876	**Rutherford B. Hayes**	Republican	79,258	50.88%	6	Samuel J. Tilden	Democratic	76,460	49.08%	–	66	0.04%	–	6	
1880	Winfield Scott Hancock	Democratic	80,426	48.98%	5	**James A. Garfield**	Republican	80,282	48.89%	1	3,510	2.14%	–	6	
1884	James G. Blaine	Republican	102,369	51.97%	8	**Grover Cleveland**	Democratic	89,288	45.33%	–	5,331	2.71%	–	8	
1888	**Benjamin Harrison**	Republican	124,816	49.66%	8	Grover Cleveland	Democratic	117,729	46.84%	–	8,794	3.49%	–	8	
1892	**Grover Cleveland**	Democratic	118,174	43.83%	8	Benjamin Harrison	Republican	118,027	43.78%	1	33,408	12.39%	–	9	(Note: In 1892, Populist candidate James B. Weaver won 25,311 votes (9.39%) in California but did not receive an electoral vote from the state.)
1896	**William McKinley**	Republican	146,688	49.16%	8	William Jennings Bryan	Democratic	144,766	48.51%	1	6,965	2.33%	–	9	
1900	**William McKinley**	Republican	164,755	54.50%	9	William Jennings Bryan	Democratic	124,985	41.34%	–	13,264	4.38%	–	9	
1904	**Theodore Roosevelt**	Republican	205,226	61.84%	10	Alton B. Parker	Democratic	89,404	26.94%	–	37,248	11.22%	–	10	(Note: In 1904, Socialist candidate Eugene V. Debs won 29,535 votes (8.90%) in California but did not receive an electoral vote from the state.)
1908	**William Howard Taft**	Republican	214,398	55.46%	10	William Jennings Bryan	Democratic	127,492	32.98%	–	44,707	11.56%	–	10	(Note: In 1908, Socialist candidate Eugene V. Debs won 28,659 votes (7.41%) in California but did not receive an electoral vote from the state.)
1912	Theodore Roosevelt	Progressive	283,610	41.83%	11	**Woodrow Wilson**	Democratic	283,436	41.81%	2	110,898	16.36%	–	13	(Note: In 1912, Socialist candidate Eugene V. Debs won 79,201 votes (11.68%) in California but did not receive an electoral vote from the state.)
1916	**Woodrow Wilson**	Democratic	466,289	46.65%	13	Charles Evans Hughes	Republican	462,516	46.27%	–	70,798	7.08%	–	13	
1920	**Warren G. Harding**	Republican	624,992	66.20%	13	James M. Cox	Democratic	229,191	24.28%	–	89,867	9.52%	–	13	(Note: In 1920, Socialist candidate Eugene V. Debs won 64,076 votes (6.79%) in California but did not receive an electoral vote from the state.)
1924	**Calvin Coolidge**	Republican	733,250	57.20%	13	Robert M. La Follette	Socialist	424,649	33.13%	–	124,001	9.67%	–	13	(Note: In 1924, Democratic candidate John W. Davis won 105,514 votes (8.23%) in California but did not receive an electoral vote from the state.)
1928	**Herbert Hoover**	Republican	1,162,323	64.69%	13	Al Smith	Democratic	614,365	34.19%	–	19,968	1.11%	–	13	
1932	**Franklin D. Roosevelt**	Democratic	1,324,157	58.39%	22	Herbert Hoover	Republican	847,902	37.39%	–	95,907	4.22%	–	22	
1936	**Franklin D. Roosevelt**	Democratic	1,766,836	66.95%	22	Alf Landon	Republican	836,431	31.70%	–	35,615	1.35%	–	22	
1940	**Franklin D. Roosevelt**	Democratic	1,877,618	57.44%	22	Wendell Willkie	Republican	1,351,419	41.34%	–	39,754	1.22%	–	22	
1944	**Franklin D. Roosevelt**	Democratic	1,988,564	56.48%	25	Thomas E. Dewey	Republican	1,512,965	42.97%	–	19,346	0.55%	–	25	
1948	**Harry S. Truman**	Democratic	1,913,134	47.57%	25	Thomas E. Dewey	Republican	1,895,269	47.13%	–	213,135	5.29%	–	25	
1952	**Dwight D. Eisenhower**	Republican	3,035,587	56.83%	32	Adlai Stevenson II	Democratic	2,257,646	42.27%	–	48,370	0.90%	–	32	
1956	**Dwight D. Eisenhower**	Republican	3,027,668	55.39%	32	Adlai Stevenson II	Democratic	2,420,135	44.27%	–	18,552	0.34%	–	32	
1960	Richard Nixon	Republican	3,259,722	50.10%	32	**John F. Kennedy**	Democratic	3,224,099	49.55%	–	22,757	0.35%	–	32	
1964	**Lyndon B. Johnson**	Democratic	4,171,877	59.11%	40	Barry Goldwater	Republican	2,879,108	40.79%	–	6,601	0.09%	–	40	
1968	**Richard Nixon**	Republican	3,467,664	47.82%	40	Hubert Humphrey	Democratic	3,244,318	44.74%	–	539,605	7.44%	–	40	(Note: In 1968, American Independent candidate George Wallace won 487,270 votes (6.72%) in California but did not receive an electoral vote from the state.)
1972	**Richard Nixon**	Republican	4,602,096	55.00%	45	George McGovern	Democratic	3,475,847	41.54%	–	289,919	3.47%	–	45	
1976	Gerald Ford	Republican	3,882,244	49.35%	45	**Jimmy Carter**	Democratic	3,742,284	47.57%	–	242,589	3.08%	–	45	
1980	**Ronald Reagan**	Republican	4,524,858	52.69%	45	Jimmy Carter	Democratic	3,083,661	35.91%	–	978,544	11.40%	–	45	(Note: In 1980, Independent candidate John B. Anderson won 739,833 votes (8.72%) in California but did not receive an electoral vote from the state.)
1984	**Ronald Reagan**	Republican	5,467,009	57.51%	47	Walter Mondale	Democratic	3,922,519	41.27%	–	115,895	1.22%	–	47	
1988	**George H. W. Bush**	Republican	5,054,917	51.13%	47	Michael Dukakis	Democratic	4,702,233	47.56%	–	129,914	1.32%	–	47	
1992	**Bill Clinton**	Democratic	5,121,325	46.01%	54	George H. W. Bush	Republican	3,630,574	32.61%	–	2,379,822	21.38%	–	54	(Note: In 1992, Independent candidate Ross Perot won 2,296,006 votes (20.63%) in California but did not receive an electoral vote from the state.)
1996	**Bill Clinton**	Democratic	5,119,835	51.10%	54	Bob Dole	Republican	3,828,380	38.21%	–	1,071,269	10.68%	–	54	(Note: In 1996, Reform candidate Ross Perot won 697,847 votes (6.96%) in California but did not receive an electoral vote from the state.)
2000	Al Gore	Democratic	5,861,203	53.45%	54	**George W. Bush**	Republican	4,567,429	41.65%	–	537,224	4.91%	–	54	
2004	John Kerry	Democratic	6,745,485	54.31%	55	**George W. Bush**	Republican	5,509,826	44.36%	–	166,548	1.34%	–	55	
2008	**Barack Obama**	Democratic	8,274,473	61.01%	55	John McCain	Republican	5,011,781	36.95%	–	296,829	2.19%	–	55	
2012	**Barack Obama**	Democratic	7,854,285	60.24%	55	Mitt Romney	Republican	4,839,958	37.12%	–	361,572	2.77%	–	55	
2016	Hillary Clinton	Democratic	8,753,788	61.73%	55	**Donald Trump**	Republican	4,483,810	31.62%	–	1,005,843	7.06%	–	55	
2020	**Joe Biden**	Democratic	11,110,250	63.48%	55	Donald Trump	Republican	6,006,429	34.32%	–	384,192	2.20%	–	55	
2024	Kamala Harris	Democratic	9,276,179	58.47%	54	**Donald Trump**	Republican	6,081,697	38.33%	–	507,599	3.20%	–	54	
Year	Candidate	Party	Votes	%	EV	Candidate	Party	Votes	%	EV	Votes	%	EV	TEV	Sources
Year	Winner					Runner-up					Other			TEV	Sources

== Results maps ==
1976 United States presidential election

1980 United States presidential election

1984 United States presidential election

1988 United States presidential election

1992 United States presidential election

1996 United States presidential election

2000 United States presidential election

2004 United States presidential election

2008 United States presidential election

2012 United States presidential election

2016 United States presidential election

2020 United States presidential election

2024 United States presidential election

== See also ==
- Elections in California
- List of United States Senate elections in California
