= 1876 United States presidential election in California =

- November 7, 1876
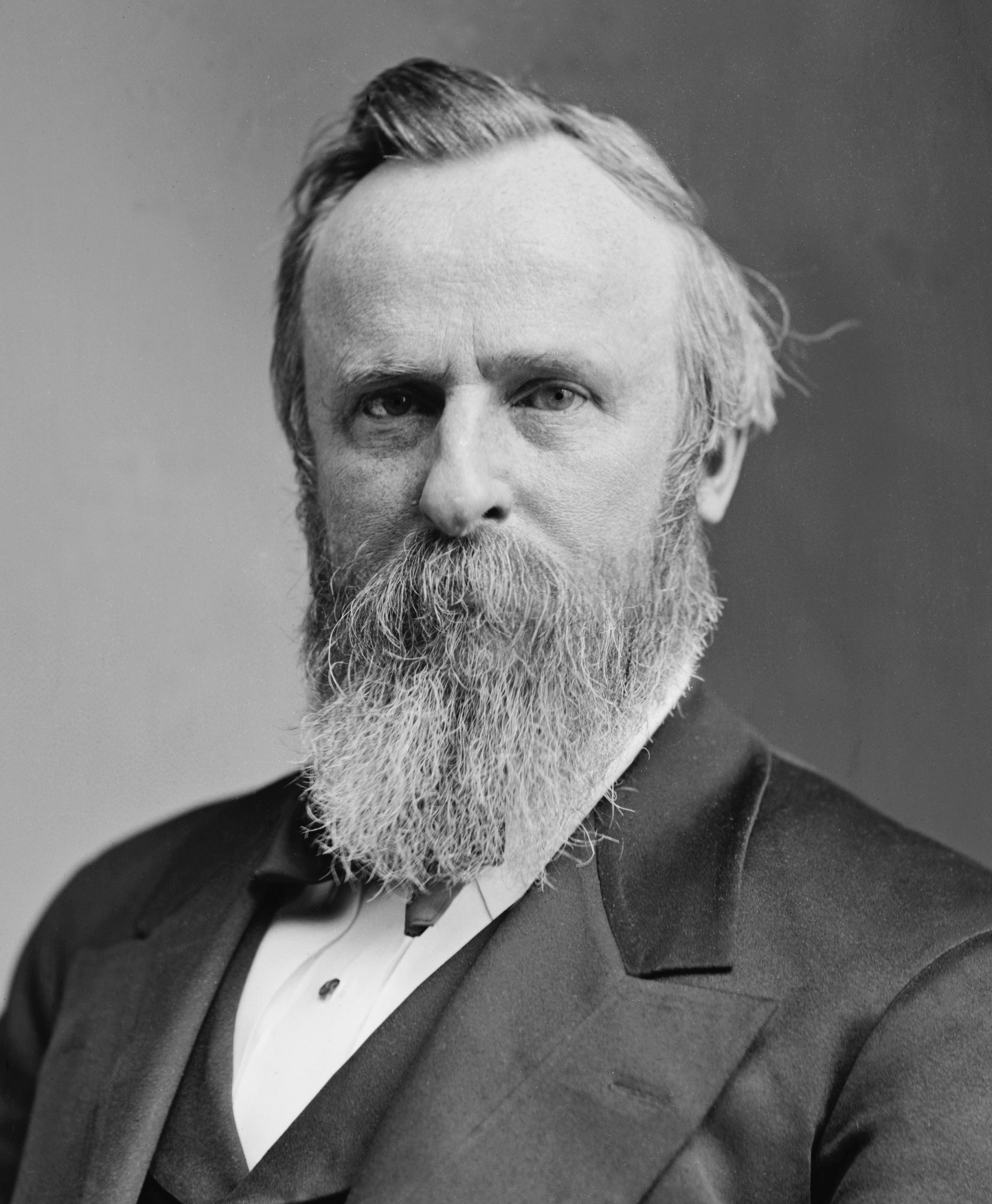

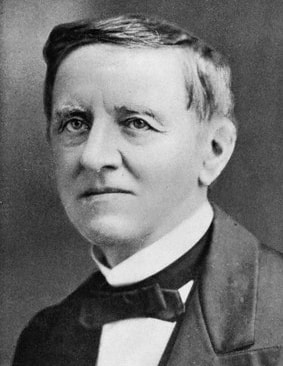
Nominee	Rutherford B. Hayes	Samuel J. Tilden
Party	Republican	Democratic
Home state	Ohio	New York
Running mate	William A. Wheeler	Thomas A. Hendricks
Electoral vote	6	0
Popular vote	78,614 (Note: Many sources give Hayes' vote as 79,258, but this figure corresponds to the first elector listed on the canvass rather than the highest elector on the Republican ticket. It also includes the votes from Marin County which were not counted in the official canvass)	75,845 (Note: Many sources give Tilden's vote as 76,480, but this figure corresponds to the first elector listed on the canvass rather than the highest elector on the Democratic ticket. It also includes the votes from Marin County which were not counted in the official canvass)
Percentage	50.87%	49.08%
County results
Hayes
50–60%
60–70%
Tilden
50–60%
60–70%
70–80%
President before election
Ulysses S. Grant
Republican
Elected President
Rutherford B. Hayes
Republican

The 1876 United States presidential election in California was held on November 7, 1876, as part of the 1876 United States presidential election. State voters chose six representatives, or electors, to the Electoral College, who voted for president and vice president.

California narrowly voted for the Republican nominee, Ohio Governor Rutherford B. Hayes, over the Democratic nominee, New York Governor Samuel J. Tilden.

The 1876 election was the closest two-candidate contest in the history of the Electoral College, with Hayes ultimately winning by a single electoral vote following the controversial resolution of disputed returns in other states. Hayes thus needed all six of California's electoral votes to win. While most sources give Hayes' plurality in California as 2,798, at the time Californian voters chose presidential electors individually. In four subsequent presidential elections (1880, 1888, 1896 and 1912), the overall results were sufficiently close that the state split its electoral ticket between two candidates. If this had occurred in 1876, Tilden would have been elected president.

== Results ==
General Election Results
Party	Pledged to	Elector	Votes
Republican Party	Rutherford B. Hayes	John B. Felton	78,614
Republican Party	Rutherford B. Hayes	John H. Jewett	78,610
Republican Party	Rutherford B. Hayes	Morris M. Estee	78,609
Republican Party	Rutherford B. Hayes	John F. Miller	78,607
Republican Party	Rutherford B. Hayes	H. J. Ostrander	78,605
Republican Party	Rutherford B. Hayes	D. A. McKinley	78,604
Democratic Party	Samuel J. Tilden	John S. Hager	75,845
Democratic Party	Samuel J. Tilden	J. Campbell Shorb	75,842
Democratic Party	Samuel J. Tilden	Stuart M. Taylor	75,842
Democratic Party	Samuel J. Tilden	Frank Ganahl	75,841
Democratic Party	Samuel J. Tilden	Barclay Henley	75,839
Democratic Party	Samuel J. Tilden	Joseph H. Budd	75,832
Greenback Party	Peter Cooper	Alfred Credge	47
Greenback Party	Peter Cooper	John Condra	47
Greenback Party	Peter Cooper	S. Harris Herring	47
Greenback Party	Peter Cooper	B. K. Lowe	47
Greenback Party	Peter Cooper	J. H. Redstone	47
Greenback Party	Peter Cooper	C. B. Smith	47
Write-in		Scattering	19
Votes cast (Note: Based on totals for highest elector on each ticket)			154,544

=== Results by county ===
County	Rutherford B. Hayes Republican		Samuel J. Tilden Democratic		Peter Cooper Greenback		Scattering		Margin		Total votes cast (Note: Based on highest elector on each ticket)
County	#	%	#	%	#	%	#	%	#	%	Total votes cast
Alameda	4,938	59.52%	3,347	40.34%	12	0.14%	0	0.00%	1,591	19.18%	8,297
Alpine	110	62.86%	65	37.14%	0	0.00%	0	0.00%	45	25.71%	175
Amador	1,172	47.13%	1,315	52.87%	0	0.00%	0	0.00%	−143	−5.75%	2,487
Butte	1,665	50.47%	1,634	49.53%	0	0.00%	0	0.00%	31	0.94%	3,299
Calaveras	886	48.63%	936	51.37%	0	0.00%	0	0.00%	−50	−2.74%	1,822
Colusa	766	34.29%	1,468	65.71%	0	0.00%	0	0.00%	−702	−31.42%	2,234
Contra Costa	1,184	58.58%	837	41.42%	0	0.00%	0	0.00%	347	17.17%	2,021
Del Norte	186	44.93%	228	55.07%	0	0.00%	0	0.00%	−42	−10.14%	414
El Dorado	1,331	48.02%	1,441	51.98%	0	0.00%	0	0.00%	−110	−3.97%	2,772
Fresno	338	25.88%	968	74.12%	0	0.00%	0	0.00%	−630	−48.24%	1,306
Humboldt	1,637	59.20%	1127	40.76%	1	0.04%	0	0.00%	510	18.44%	2,765
Inyo	343	47.77%	375	52.23%	0	0.00%	0	0.00%	−32	−4.46%	718
Kern	556	39.71%	844	60.29%	0	0.00%	0	0.00%	−288	−20.57%	1,400
Lake	380	35.02%	702	64.70%	0	0.00%	3	0.28%	−322	−29.68%	1,085
Lassen	256	53.00%	227	47.00%	0	0.00%	0	0.00%	29	6.00%	483
Los Angeles	3,041	45.59%	3,615	54.20%	14	0.21%	0	0.00%	−574	−8.61%	6,670
Marin (Note: The votes from Marin County were not counted in the official canvass because the county clerk forgot to submit the county's election returns to the Secretary of State)	651	51.26%	619	48.74%	0	0.00%	0	0.00%	32	2.52%	1,270
Mariposa	364	39.65%	554	60.35%	0	0.00%	0	0.00%	−190	−20.70%	918
Mendocino	929	42.00%	1,283	58.00%	0	0.00%	0	0.00%	−354	−16.00%	2,212
Merced	558	40.97%	804	59.03%	0	0.00%	0	0.00%	−246	−18.06%	1,362
Modoc	208	39.25%	322	60.75%	0	0.00%	0	0.00%	−114	−21.51%	530
Mono	153	55.04%	125	44.96%	0	0.00%	0	0.00%	28	10.07%	278
Monterey	1,182	53.80%	1,012	46.06%	0	0.00%	3	0.14%	170	7.74%	2,197
Napa	1,153	54.49%	963	45.51%	0	0.00%	0	0.00%	190	8.98%	2,116
Nevada	2,300	54.70%	1,905	45.30%	0	0.00%	0	0.00%	395	9.39%	4,205
Placer	1,610	55.75%	1,278	44.25%	0	0.00%	0	0.00%	332	11.50%	2,888
Plumas	583	53.73%	502	46.27%	0	0.00%	0	0.00%	81	7.47%	1,085
Sacramento	3,838	60.71%	2,484	39.29%	0	0.00%	0	0.00%	1,354	21.42%	6,322
San Benito	434	39.45%	664	60.36%	0	0.00%	2	0.18%	−230	−20.91%	1,100
San Bernardino	674	51.85%	607	46.69%	19	1.46%	0	0.00%	67	5.15%	1,300
San Diego	794	54.31%	668	45.69%	0	0.00%	0	0.00%	126	8.62%	1,462
San Francisco	21,172	50.93%	20,399	49.07%	0	0.00%	1	0.00%	773	1.86%	41,572
San Joaquin	2,270	55.10%	1,850	44.90%	0	0.00%	0	0.00%	420	10.19%	4,120
San Luis Obispo	772	44.99%	944	55.01%	0	0.00%	0	0.00%	−172	−10.02%	1,716
San Mateo	871	55.58%	696	44.42%	0	0.00%	0	0.00%	175	11.17%	1,567
Santa Barbara	1,174	61.15%	743	38.72%	0	0.00%	2	0.10%	431	22.46%	1,919
Santa Clara	3,335	52.09%	3,065	47.88%	1	0.02%	1	0.02%	270	4.22%	6,402
Santa Cruz	1,537	57.59%	1,132	42.41%	0	0.00%	0	0.00%	405	15.17%	2,669
Shasta	625	49.37%	641	50.63%	0	0.00%	0	0.00%	−16	−1.26%	1,226
Sierra	917	64.31%	509	35.69%	0	0.00%	0	0.00%	408	28.61%	1,426
Siskiyou	718	45.47%	861	54.53%	0	0.00%	0	0.00%	−143	−9.06%	1,579
Solano	1,951	52.67%	1,753	47.33%	0	0.00%	0	0.00%	198	5.35%	3,704
Sonoma	2,432	45.50%	2,907	54.39%	0	0.00%	6	0.11%	−475	−8.89%	5,345
Stanislaus	801	42.20%	1,097	57.80%	0	0.00%	0	0.00%	−296	−15.60%	1,898
Sutter	550	49.82%	553	50.09%	0	0.00%	1	0.09%	−3	−0.27%	1,104
Tehama	646	48.94%	674	51.06%	0	0.00%	0	0.00%	−28	−2.12%	1,320
Trinity	388	48.74%	408	51.26%	0	0.00%	0	0.00%	−20	−2.51%	796
Tulare	986	41.85%	1,370	58.15%	0	0.00%	0	0.00%	−384	−16.30%	2,356
Tuolumne	809	46.90%	916	53.10%	0	0.00%	0	0.00%	−107	−6.20%	1,725
Ventura	608	50.71%	591	49.29%	0	0.00%	0	0.00%	17	1.42%	1,199
Yolo	1,233	47.55%	1,360	52.45%	0	0.00%	0	0.00%	−127	−4.90%	2,593
Yuba	1,250	53.74%	1,076	46.26%	0	0.00%	0	0.00%	174	7.48%	2,326
Total (Note: Does not include the votes from Marin County)	78,614	50.87%	75,845	49.08%	47	0.03%	19	0.01%	2,769	1.79%	154,544

==== Counties that flipped from Republican to Democratic ====
- Amador
- Calaveras
- Del Norte
- El Dorado
- Inyo
- Los Angeles
- Mariposa
- San Benito
- San Luis Obispo
- Siskiyou
- Sonoma
- Sutter
- Tehama
- Trinity
- Tuolumne
- Yolo

==== Counties that flipped from Liberal Republican to Democratic ====
- Colusa
- Fresno
- Kern
- Lake
- Mendocino
- Merced
- Shasta
- Stanislaus
- Tulare

== See also ==
- United States presidential elections in California
