= 1864 United States presidential election in California =

- November 8, 1864

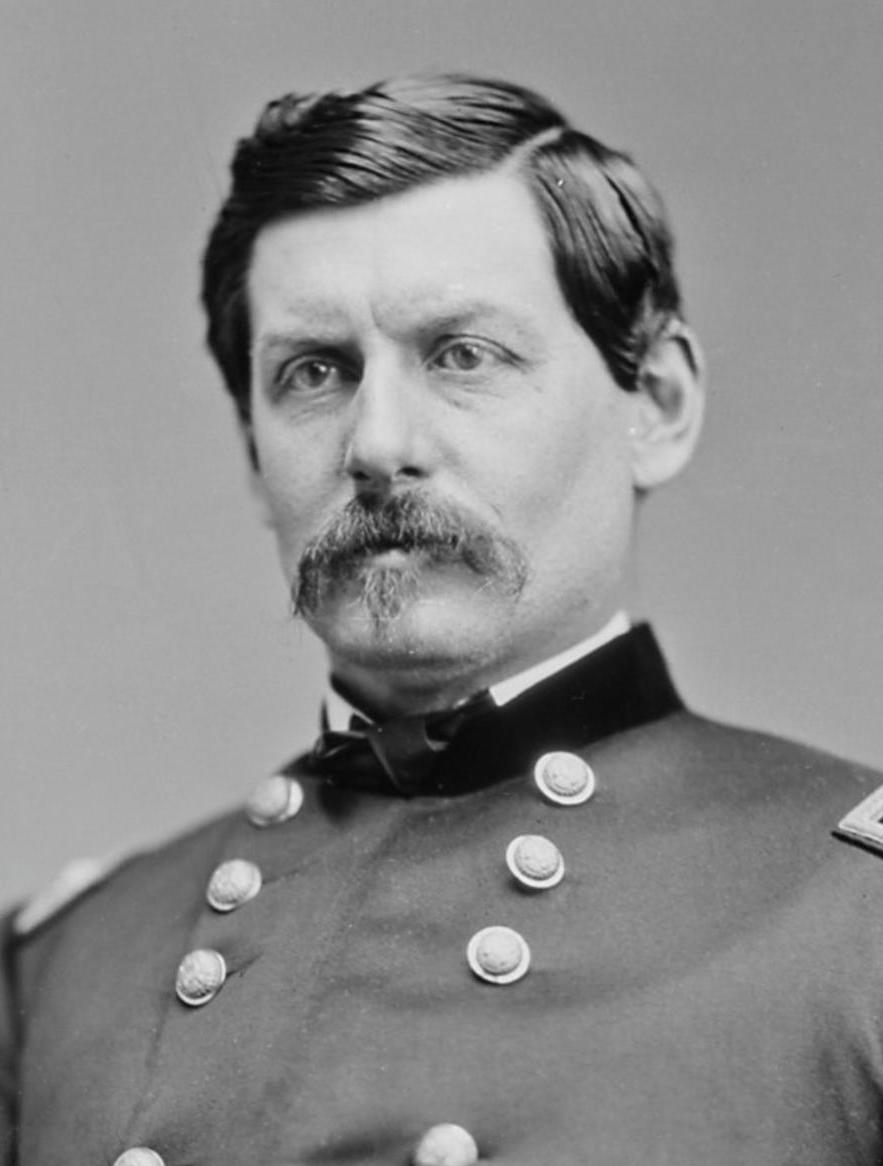
Nominee	Abraham Lincoln	George B. McClellan
Party	National Union	Democratic
Home state	Illinois	New Jersey
Running mate	Andrew Johnson	George H. Pendleton
Electoral vote	5	0
Popular vote	62,140	43,838
Percentage	58.63%	41.36%
County results
Lincoln
50–60%
60–70%
70–80%
80–90%
McClellan
50–60%
60–70%
70–80%
President before election
Abraham Lincoln
Republican
Elected President
Abraham Lincoln
National Union

The 1864 United States presidential election in California took place on November 8, 1864, as part of the 1864 United States presidential election. State voters chose five electors of the Electoral College, who voted for president and vice president.

California was won by the Republican incumbent, Abraham Lincoln, running on the Nation Union ticket with his running mate Andrew Johnson. They defeated the Democratic nominee, Union Army Major General George B. McClellan and his running mate George H. Pendleton. Lincoln won the state by a margin of 17.2%.

== Results ==
General Election Results
Party	Pledged to	Elector	Votes
National Union	Abraham Lincoln (incumbent)	W. W. Crane	62,140
National Union	Abraham Lincoln (incumbent)	Warner Oliver	62,131 (Note: The manuscript returns give this total as 62,141 but this appears to be a mistake)
National Union	Abraham Lincoln (incumbent)	J. G. McCallum	62,120
National Union	Abraham Lincoln (incumbent)	Charles Maclay	62,118 (Note: The manuscript returns give this total as 62,128 but this appears to be a mistake)
National Union	Abraham Lincoln (incumbent)	Samuel Brannan	62,050
Democratic Party	George B. McClellan	Joseph Hamilton	43,838
Democratic Party	George B. McClellan	John T. Doyle	43,837
Democratic Party	George B. McClellan	W. F. White	43,831
Democratic Party	George B. McClellan	E. J. Lewis	43,828
Democratic Party	George B. McClellan	H. P. Barber	43,827
Write-in		Scattering	8
Votes cast (Note: Based on totals for highest elector on each ticket)			105,986

=== Results by county ===
County	Abraham Lincoln National Union		George B. McClellan Democratic		Scattering Write-in		Margin		Total votes cast (Note: Based on highest elector on each ticket)
County	#	%	#	%	#	%	#	%	Total votes cast
Alameda	1,467	64.40%	811	35.60%	0	0.00%	656	28.80%	2,278
Alpine	384	62.75%	228	37.25%	0	0.00%	156	25.49%	612
Amador	1,392	53.72%	1,199	46.28%	0	0.00%	193	7.45%	2,591
Butte	1,739	60.89%	1,117	39.11%	0	0.00%	622	21.78%	2,856
Calaveras	2,071	56.96%	1,565	43.04%	0	0.00%	506	13.92%	3,636
Colusa	274	39.20%	425	60.80%	0	0.00%	−151	−21.60%	699
Contra Costa	958	64.73%	522	35.27%	0	0.00%	436	29.46%	1,480
Del Norte	167	54.58%	139	45.42%	0	0.00%	28	9.15%	306
El Dorado	2,949	58.17%	2,121	41.83%	0	0.00%	828	16.33%	5,070
Fresno	92	20.40%	359	79.60%	0	0.00%	−267	−59.20%	451
Humboldt	423	61.75%	262	38.25%	0	0.00%	161	23.50%	685
Klamath (Note: The returns from this county arrived late but were included in the final canvass)	139	53.26%	122	46.74%	0	0.00%	17	6.51%	261
Lake	213	34.47%	405	65.53%	0	0.00%	−192	−31.07%	618
Lassen	318	57.40%	236	42.60%	0	0.00%	82	14.80%	554
Los Angeles (Note: The returns from this county arrived late but were included in the final canvass)	555	42.73%	744	57.27%	0	0.00%	-189	-14.55%	1,299
Marin	685	62.50%	411	37.50%	0	0.00%	274	25.00%	1,096
Mariposa	767	47.67%	842	52.33%	0	0.00%	-75	-4.66%	1,609
Mendocino	576	42.54%	778	57.46%	0	0.00%	−202	−14.92%	1,354
Merced	73	25.09%	218	74.91%	0	0.00%	−145	−49.83%	291
Mono (Note: The returns from this county arrived late but were included in the final canvass)	167	54.93%	137	45.07%	0	0.00%	30	9.87%	304
Monterey	415	53.27%	364	46.73%	0	0.00%	51	6.55%	779
Napa	735	55.35%	593	44.65%	0	0.00%	142	10.69%	1,328
Nevada	2,784	60.88%	1,789	39.12%	0	0.00%	995	21.76%	4,573
Placer	2,314	60.91%	1,485	39.09%	0	0.00%	829	21.82%	3,799
Plumas	828	55.31%	669	44.69%	0	0.00%	159	10.62%	1,497
Sacramento	4,192	70.38%	1,764	29.62%	0	0.00%	2,428	40.77%	5,956
San Bernardino	243	33.02%	493	66.98%	0	0.00%	-250	-33.97%	736
San Diego	97	32.99%	197	67.01%	0	0.00%	-100	-34.01%	294
San Francisco	12,667	60.24%	8,354	39.73%	8	0.04%	4,313	20.51%	21,029
San Joaquin	1,849	56.44%	1,427	43.56%	0	0.00%	422	12.88%	3,276
San Luis Obispo	259	63.48%	149	36.52%	0	0.00%	110	26.96%	408
San Mateo	600	61.41%	377	38.59%	0	0.00%	223	22.82%	977
Santa Barbara (Note: The returns from this county arrived late but were included in the final canvass)	343	81.09%	80	18.91%	0	0.00%	263	62.17%	423
Santa Clara	1,930	61.62%	1,202	38.38%	0	0.00%	728	23.24%	3,132
Santa Cruz	974	68.26%	453	31.74%	0	0.00%	521	36.51%	1,427
Shasta	909	61.79%	562	38.21%	0	0.00%	347	23.59%	1,471
Sierra	2,051	66.42%	1,037	33.58%	0	0.00%	1,014	32.84%	3,088
Siskiyou	925	49.15%	957	50.85%	0	0.00%	-32	-1.70%	1,882
Solano	1,255	58.02%	908	41.98%	0	0.00%	347	16.04%	2,163
Sonoma	2,026	46.45%	2,336	53.55%	0	0.00%	-310	-7.11%	4,362
Stanislaus	277	44.46%	346	55.54%	0	0.00%	−69	−11.08%	623
Sutter	677	53.60%	586	46.40%	0	0.00%	91	7.21%	1,263
Tehama	482	56.97%	364	43.03%	0	0.00%	118	13.95%	846
Trinity	653	58.62%	461	41.38%	0	0.00%	192	17.24%	1,114
Tulare (Note: The returns from this county arrived late but were included in the final canvass)	528	45.32%	637	54.68%	0	0.00%	−109	−9.36%	1,165
Tuolumne	1,589	50.38%	1,565	49.62%	0	0.00%	24	0.76%	3,154
Yolo	653	57.99%	473	42.01%	0	0.00%	180	15.99%	1,126
Yuba	1,870	58.38%	1,333	41.62%	0	0.00%	537	16.77%	3,203
Soldiers	2,606	91.70%	236	8.30%	0	0.00%	2,370	83.39%	2,842
Total	62,140	58.63%	43,838	41.36%	8	0.01%	18,302	17.27%	105,986

==== Counties that flipped from Democratic to Republican ====
- Amador
- Butte
- Calaveras
- Del Norte
- El Dorado
- Klamath
- Humboldt
- Napa
- Placer
- Plumas
- Sacramento
- San Joaquin
- San Luis Obispo
- San Mateo
- Santa Barbara
- Shasta
- Sierra
- Solano
- Tehama
- Tuolumne
- Yolo
- Sutter
- Trinity
- Yuba

==== Counties that flipped from Republican to Democratic ====
- San Bernardino

== See also ==
- United States presidential elections in California
