= 1860 United States presidential election in California =

- November 6, 1860
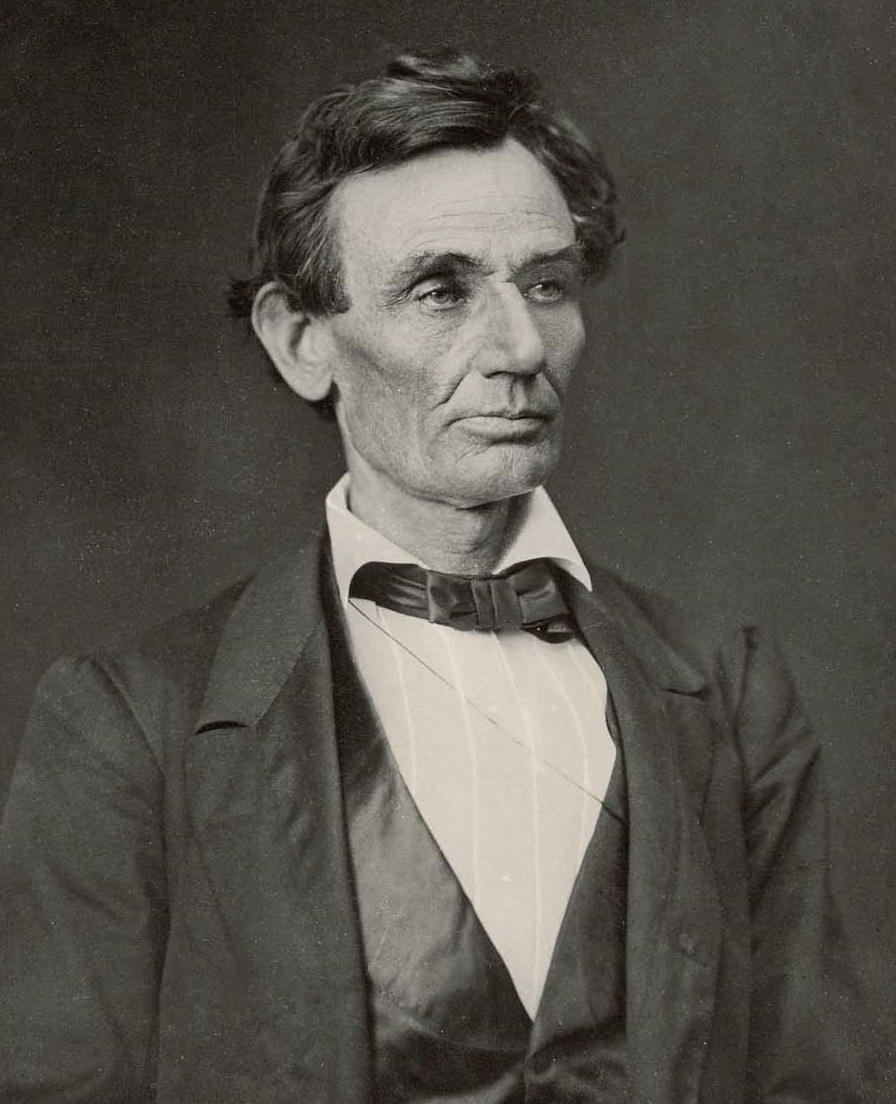

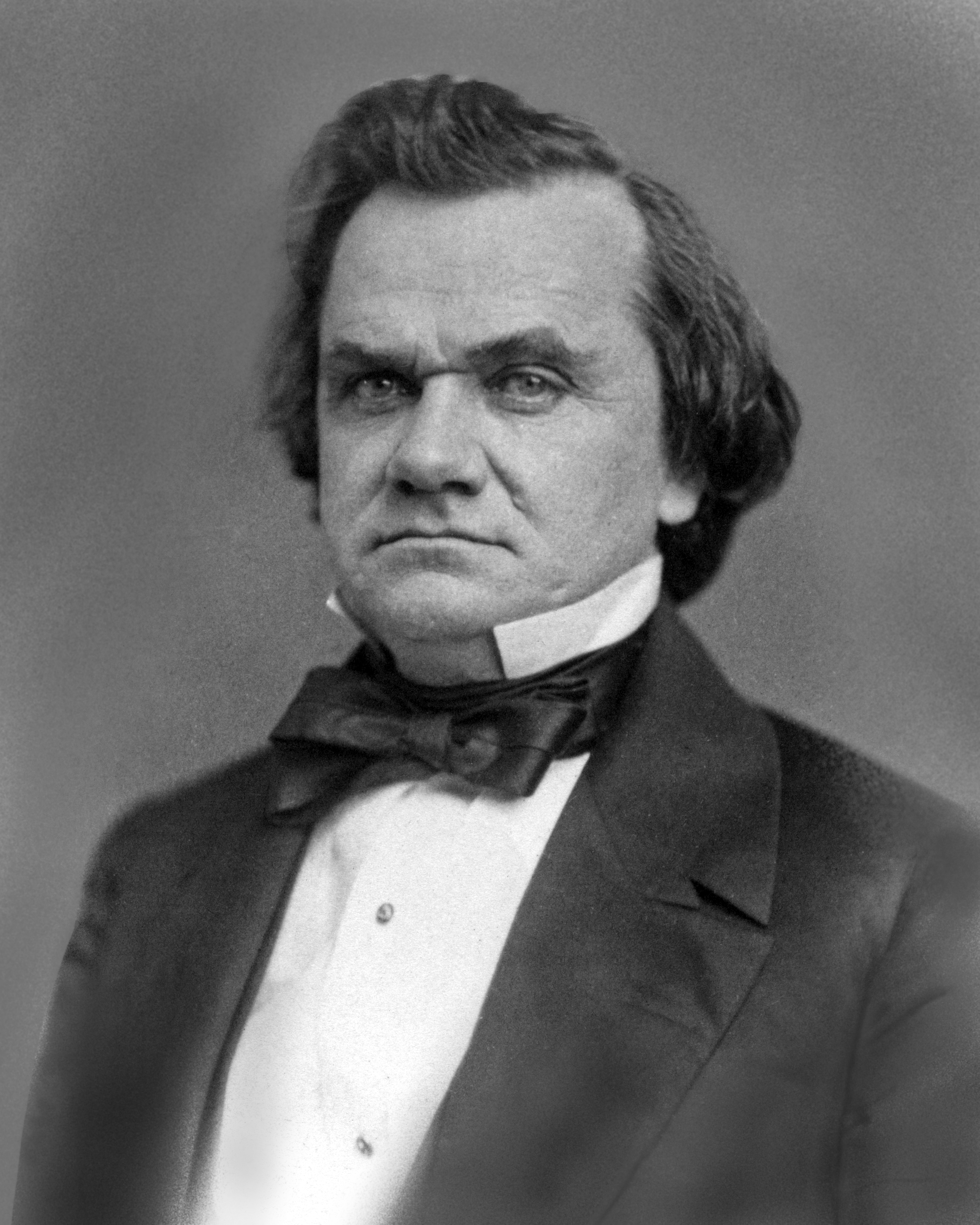

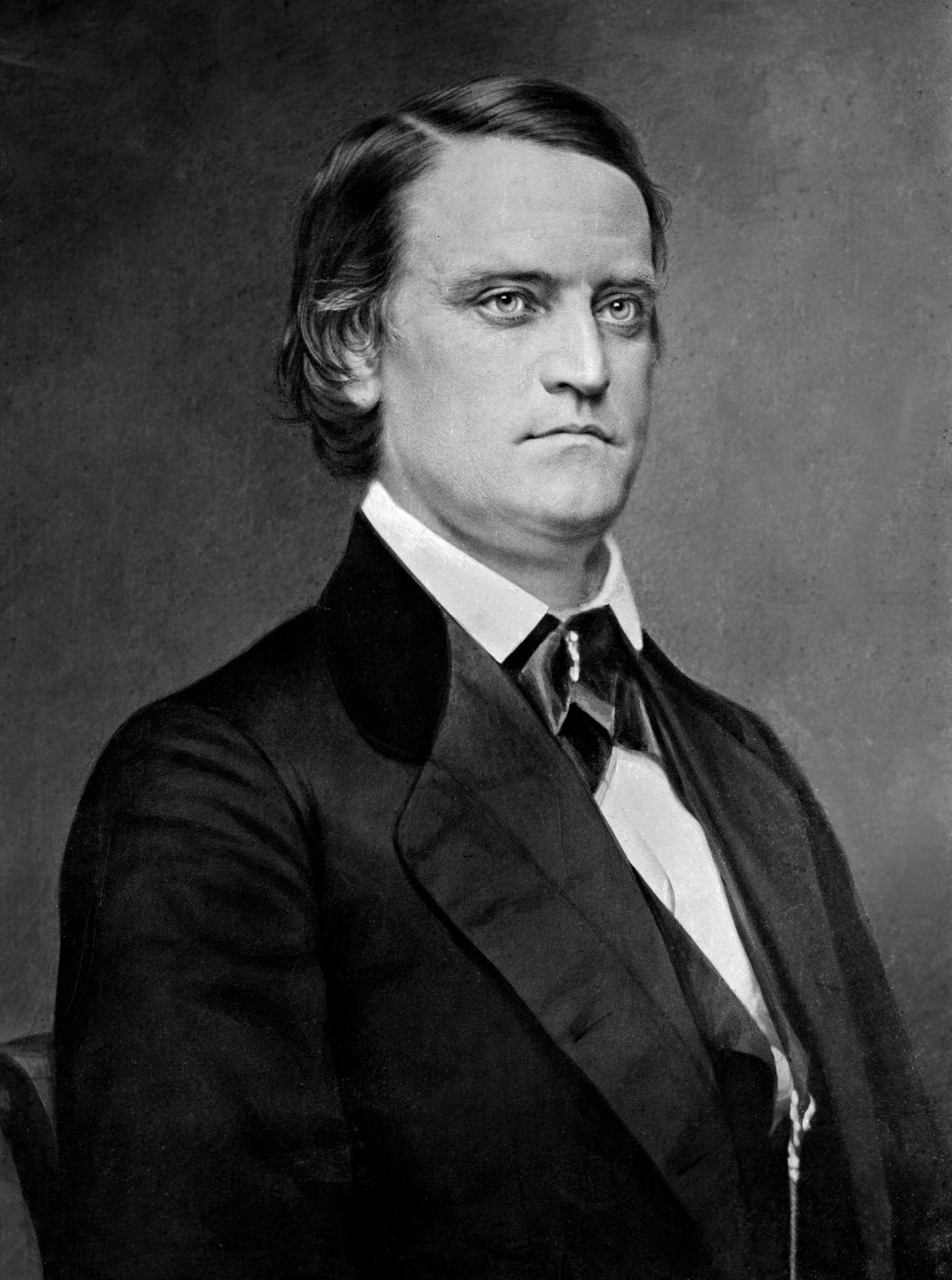

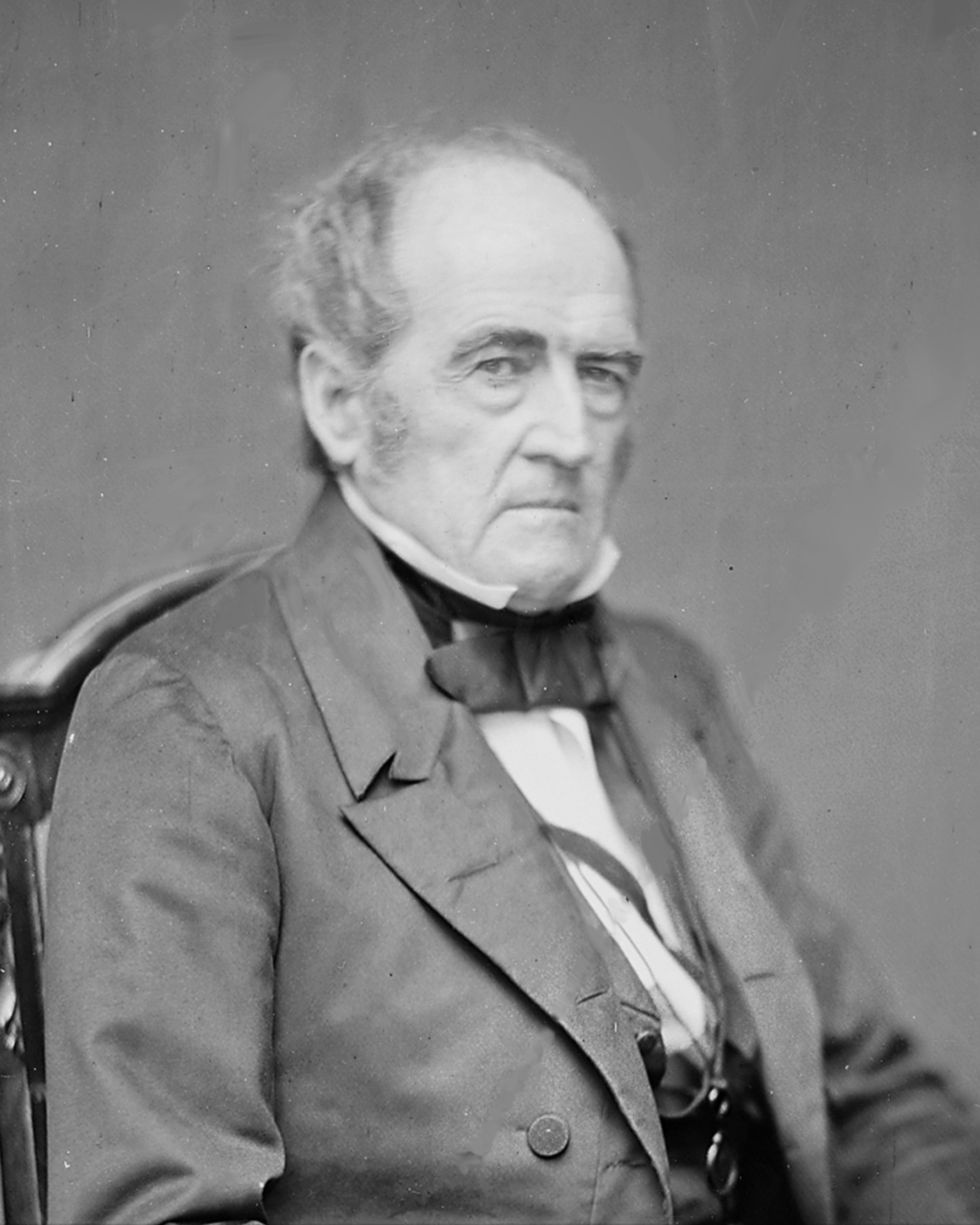
Nominee	Abraham Lincoln	Stephen A. Douglas
Party	Republican	Democratic
Home state	Illinois	Illinois
Running mate	Hannibal Hamlin	Herschel V. Johnson
Electoral vote	4	0
Popular vote	38,734	38,023
Percentage	32.31%	31.72%
Nominee	John C. Breckinridge	John Bell
Party	Southern Democratic	Constitutional Union
Home state	Kentucky	Tennessee
Running mate	Joseph Lane	Edward Everett
Electoral vote	0	0
Popular vote	33,975	9,136
Percentage	28.34%	7.62%
County results
Lincoln
30–40%
40–50%
Douglas
30–40%
40–50%
50–60%
60–70%
Breckinridge
30–40%
40–50%
50–60%
President before election
James Buchanan
Democratic
Elected President
Abraham Lincoln
Republican

The 1860 United States presidential election in California took place on November 6, 1860, as part of the 1860 United States presidential election. State voters chose four representatives, or electors, to the Electoral College, who voted for president and vice president.

California narrowly voted for the Republican nominee, former Illinois representative Abraham Lincoln. He defeated the Democratic nominee, Illinois Senator Stephen A. Douglas, the Southern Democratic nominee, Vice President John C. Breckinridge and the Constitutional Union nominee John Bell. Lincoln won the state by a narrow margin of 0.61%, or 734 votes. California would be Lincoln's worst-performing state that he still carried.

After this election, Humboldt County would not vote for a Democratic candidate again until 1932. This was also the last time a Democratic candidate would carry Placer County and Plumas County until 1916, nor would any Democratic candidate carry Napa County, San Mateo County, and Solano County again until 1912.

== Results ==
General Election Results
Party	Pledged to	Elector	Votes
Republican Party	Abraham Lincoln	Charles A. Tuttle	38,734
Republican Party	Abraham Lincoln	Charles Washburn	38,733
Republican Party	Abraham Lincoln	W. H. Weeks	38,720
Republican Party	Abraham Lincoln	Antonio M. Pico	38,699
Democratic Party	Stephen A. Douglas	Humphrey Griffith	38,023
Democratic Party	Stephen A. Douglas	R. P. Hammond	37,999
Democratic Party	Stephen A. Douglas	George F. Price	37,959
Democratic Party	Stephen A. Douglas	Pablo de la Guerra	37,957
Southern Democratic	John C. Breckinridge	Allen P. Dudley	33,975
Southern Democratic	John C. Breckinridge	Vincent E. Geiger	33,970
Southern Democratic	John C. Breckinridge	Zach Montgomery	33,970
Southern Democratic	John C. Breckinridge	Antonio T. Coronel	33,969
Constitutional Union	John Bell	Phineas L. Miner	9,136
Constitutional Union	John Bell	J. B. Crockett	9,111
Constitutional Union	John Bell	G. W. Bowie	9,110
Constitutional Union	John Bell	James H. Lander	9,098
Write-in		Scattering	17
Votes cast (Note: Based on totals for highest elector on each ticket)			119,885

=== Results by county ===
County	Abraham Lincoln Republican		Stephen A. Douglas Democratic		John C. Breckinridge Southern Democratic		John Bell Constitutional Union		Scattering Write-in		Margin		Total Votes Cast (Note: Based on highest elector on each ticket)
County	#	%	#	%	#	%	#	%	#	%	#	%	Total Votes Cast
Alameda	1,033	49.40%	513	24.53%	481	23.00%	62	2.97%	2	0.10%	520	24.87%	2,091
Amador	995	24.97%	1,866	46.84%	945	23.72%	178	4.47%	0	0.00%	-871	-21.86%	3,984
Butte	1,437	32.38%	1,502	33.84%	1,173	26.43%	326	7.35%	0	0.00%	-65	-1.46%	4,438
Calaveras	978	20.30%	1,883	39.08%	1,717	35.64%	240	4.98%	0	0.00%	-166 (Note: Margin over Breckinridge)	-3.45%	4,818
Colusa	258	27.10%	235	24.68%	386	40.55%	73	7.67%	0	0.00%	-128	-13.45%	952
Contra Costa	608	39.33%	413	26.71%	391	25.29%	134	8.67%	0	0.00%	195	12.61%	1,546
Del Norte	175	33.72%	88	16.96%	217	41.81%	39	7.51%	0	0.00%	-42	-8.09%	519
El Dorado	2,119	30.06%	2,695	38.23%	1,901	26.96%	334	4.74%	1	0.01%	-576	-8.17%	7,050
Fresno	53	11.30%	22	4.69%	271	57.78%	123	26.23%	0	0.00%	-148 (Note: Margin over Bell)	-31.56%	469
Humboldt	335	32.49%	444	43.06%	232	22.50%	20	1.94%	0	0.00%	-109	-10.57%	1,031
Klamath	92	13.77%	377	56.44%	163	24.40%	36	5.39%	0	0.00%	-214	-32.04%	668
Los Angeles	352	20.51%	475	27.68%	688	40.09%	201	11.71%	0	0.00%	-213 (Note: Margin over Douglas)	-12.41%	1,716
Marin	408	40.28%	282	27.84%	285	28.13%	38	3.75%	0	0.00%	123	12.14%	1,013
Mariposa	262	13.90%	489	25.94%	815	43.24%	319	16.92%	0	0.00%	-326	-17.29%	1,885
Mendocino	198	18.70%	235	22.19%	499	47.12%	116	10.95%	11	1.04%	-264	-24.93%	1,059
Merced	42	10.74%	52	13.30%	233	59.59%	64	16.37%	0	0.00%	-169	-43.22%	391
Monterey	306	38.64%	233	29.42%	246	31.06%	4	0.51%	3	0.38%	60	7.58%	792
Napa	441	24.79%	518	29.12%	679	38.17%	141	7.93%	0	0.00%	-161	-9.05%	1,779
Nevada	2,539	36.45%	2,373	34.07%	1,653	23.73%	400	5.74%	0	0.00%	166	2.38%	6,965
Placer	1,743	29.93%	1,858	31.90%	1,448	24.86%	775	13.31%	0	0.00%	-115	-1.97%	5,824
Plumas	458	28.18%	503	30.95%	453	27.88%	211	12.98%	0	0.00%	-45	-2.77%	1,625
Sacramento	2,670	35.40%	2,836	37.60%	1,684	22.33%	352	4.67%	0	0.00%	-166	-2.20%	7,542
San Bernardino	305	37.24%	224	27.35%	192	23.44%	98	11.97%	0	0.00%	81	9.89%	819
San Diego	81	30.45%	29	10.90%	148	55.64%	8	3.01%	0	0.00%	-67	-25.19%	266
San Francisco	6,825	47.53%	4,035	28.10%	2,560	17.83%	940	6.55%	0	0.00%	2,790	19.43%	14,360
San Joaquin	1,131	32.92%	733	21.33%	1,373	39.96%	199	5.79%	0	0.00%	-242	-7.04%	3,436
San Luis Obispo	148	34.99%	120	28.37%	155	36.64%	0	0.00%	0	0.00%	-7	-1.65%	423
San Mateo	389	35.27%	543	49.23%	130	11.79%	41	3.72%	0	0.00%	-154	-13.96%	1,103
Santa Barbara	46	9.70%	305	64.35%	123	25.95%	0	0.00%	0	0.00%	-182	-38.40%	474
Santa Clara	1,463	46.05%	881	27.73%	722	22.73%	111	3.49%	0	0.00%	582	18.32%	3,177
Santa Cruz	670	47.72%	286	20.37%	319	22.72%	129	9.19%	0	0.00%	351	25.00%	1,404
Shasta	464	19.37%	1,094	45.68%	585	24.43%	252	10.52%	0	0.00%	-509	-21.25%	2,395
Sierra	1,468	30.95%	1,539	32.45%	1,347	28.40%	389	8.20%	0	0.00%	-71	-1.50%	4,743
Siskiyou	955	25.58%	1,503	40.25%	760	20.35%	516	13.82%	0	0.00%	-548	-14.68%	3,734
Solano	681	29.33%	603	25.97%	746	32.13%	292	12.58%	0	0.00%	-65	-2.80%	2,322
Sonoma	1,236	32.85%	611	16.24%	1,467	38.98%	449	11.93%	0	0.00%	-231	-6.14%	3,763
Stanislaus	167	18.58%	232	25.81%	433	48.16%	67	7.45%	0	0.00%	-201	-22.36%	899
Sutter	403	30.44%	441	33.31%	440	33.23%	40	3.02%	0	0.00%	-1	-0.08%	1,324
Tehama	243	18.65%	496	38.07%	311	23.87%	253	19.42%	0	0.00%	-185	-14.20%	1,303
Trinity	593	27.62%	885	41.22%	516	24.03%	153	7.13%	0	0.00%	-292	-13.60%	2,147
Tulare	131	9.89%	211	15.94%	574	43.35%	408	30.82%	0	0.00%	-166	-12.54%	1,324
Tuolumne	1,633	29.47%	1,503	27.12%	2,034	36.70%	372	6.71%	0	0.00%	-401	-7.24%	5,542
Yolo	535	31.25%	497	29.03%	606	35.40%	74	4.32%	0	0.00%	-71	-4.15%	1,712
Yuba	1,665	32.92%	1,360	26.89%	1,874	37.05%	159	3.14%	0	0.00%	-209	-4.13%	5,058
Total	38,734	32.31%	38,023	31.72%	33,975	28.34%	9,136	7.62%	17	0.01%	711	0.59%	119,885

==== Counties that flipped from Democratic to Republican ====
- Alameda
- Contra Costa
- Marin
- Monterey
- Nevada
- San Bernardino
- San Francisco
- Santa Cruz

==== Counties that flipped from Know Nothing to Democratic ====
- Colusa
- Yolo

==== Counties that flipped from Republican to Democratic ====
- San Luis Obispo
- Santa Barbara

== See also ==
- United States presidential elections in California
