= 1884 United States presidential election in California =

- November 4, 1884
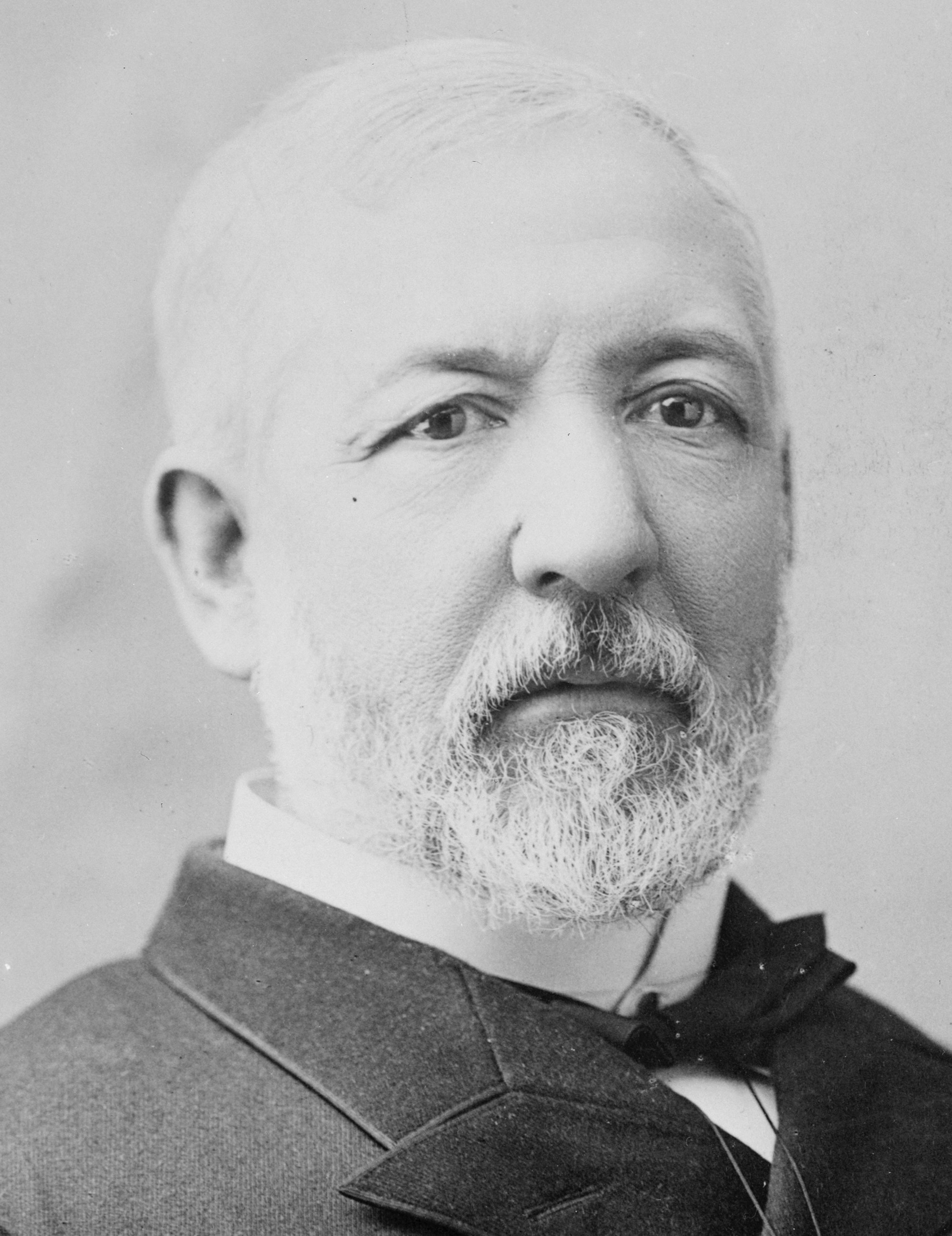

Nominee	James G. Blaine	Grover Cleveland
Party	Republican	Democratic
Home state	Maine	New York
Running mate	John A. Logan	Thomas A. Hendricks
Electoral vote	8	0
Popular vote	102,416	89,288
Percentage	51.98%	45.32%
County results
Blaine
40–50%
50–60%
60–70%
Cleveland
40–50%
50–60%
60–70%
President before election
Chester A. Arthur
Republican
Elected President
Grover Cleveland
Democratic

The 1884 United States presidential election in California was held on November 4, 1884, as part of the 1884 United States presidential election. State voters chose eight representatives, or electors, to the Electoral College, who voted for president and vice president. .

California voted for the Republican nominee, former Secretary of State James G. Blaine, by a comfortable margin, over the Democratic nominee, New York Governor Grover Cleveland.

Cleveland became the first Democrat to ever win without California since its statehood.

== Results ==
General Election Results (Note: The California State Archives does not have a single abstract showing the vote of the entire state for the 1884 election. The figures below are compiled from the individual county returns. The figures, including totals, for the highest and lowest electors on each ticket are given in the 1889 Government Roster, but that source does not list the full results for Presidential Electors.)
Party	Pledged to	Elector	Votes
Republican Party	James G. Blaine	John B. Reddick	102,416
Republican Party	James G. Blaine	Charles F. Reed	102,411
Republican Party	James G. Blaine	James D. Byers	102,397
Republican Party	James G. Blaine	Chester Rowell	102,391
Republican Party	James G. Blaine	Alvah R. Conklin	102,378
Republican Party	James G. Blaine	Henry Edgerton	102,369
Republican Party	James G. Blaine	Horace Davis	102,306
Republican Party	James G. Blaine	Marcus H. Hecht	102,223
Democratic Party	Grover Cleveland	Charles Kohler	89,288
Democratic Party	Grover Cleveland	James T. Murphy	89,235
Democratic Party	Grover Cleveland	George T. Marye	89,229
Democratic Party	Grover Cleveland	John A. Stanley	89,221
Democratic Party	Grover Cleveland	Campbell P. Berry	89,214
Democratic Party	Grover Cleveland	Marion Biggs	89,205
Democratic Party	Grover Cleveland	W. H. Webb	89,201
Democratic Party	Grover Cleveland	Wiley J. Tinnin	89,200
Prohibition Party	John St. John	M. C. Winchester	2,963
Prohibition Party	John St. John	Joel Russell	2,962
Prohibition Party	John St. John	H. S. Graves	2,961
Prohibition Party	John St. John	S. H. Varney	2,952
Prohibition Party	John St. John	J. W. Tharp	2,932
Prohibition Party	John St. John	Jesse Yarnell	2,501
Prohibition Party	John St. John	D. E. Bushnell	2,360
Prohibition Party	John St. John	A. D. Boren	2,345
Greenback Party	Benjamin Butler	Nathaniel Currey	2,037
Greenback Party	Benjamin Butler	L. F. Moulton	2,013
Greenback Party	Benjamin Butler	Rufus Butterfield	2,012
Greenback Party	Benjamin Butler	A. D. Nelson	2,011
Greenback Party	Benjamin Butler	Alfred T. Dewey	2,009
Greenback Party	Benjamin Butler	H. M. Couch	2,005
Greenback Party	Benjamin Butler	S. A. Waldron	1,973
Greenback Party	Benjamin Butler	Parker J. Merwin	1,722
Prohibition Party	John St. John	I. D. Wood	492
Prohibition Party	John St. John	George Steele	401
Prohibition Party	John St. John	A. B. Nixon	181
Write-in		Scattering	329
Votes cast (Note: Based on totals for highest elector on each ticket)			197,033

=== Results by county ===
County	James G. Blaine Republican		Grover Cleveland Democratic		John St. John Prohibition		Benjamin Butler Greenback		Scattering Write-in		Margin		Total votes cast (Note: Based on the highest elector on each ticket)
County	#	%	#	%	#	%	#	%	#	%	#	%	Total votes cast
Alameda	7,471	60.26%	4,734	38.18%	104	0.84%	89	0.72%	0	0.00%	2,737	22.08%	12,398
Alpine	56	60.87%	36	39.13%	0	0.00%	0	0.00%	0	0.00%	20	21.74%	92
Amador	1,317	47.72%	1,358	49.20%	82	2.97%	3	0.11%	0	0.00%	-41	-1.49%	2,760
Butte	2,172	49.06%	2,118	47.84%	134	3.03%	3	0.07%	0	0.00%	54	1.22%	4,427
Calaveras	1,249	51.53%	1,164	48.02%	11	0.45%	0	0.00%	0	0.00%	85	3.51%	2,424
Colusa	1,028	35.46%	1,802	62.16%	57	1.97%	12	0.41%	0	0.00%	-774	-26.70%	2,899
Contra Costa	1,496	55.86%	1,114	41.60%	63	2.35%	5	0.19%	0	0.00%	382	14.26%	2,678
Del Norte	310	49.84%	294	47.27%	3	0.48%	15	2.41%	0	0.00%	16	2.57%	622
El Dorado	1,289	45.47%	1,469	51.82%	46	1.62%	31	1.09%	0	0.00%	-180	-6.35%	2,835
Fresno	1,314	41.89%	1,704	54.32%	76	2.42%	11	0.38%	32	1.02%	-390	-12.43%	3,137
Humboldt	2,184	53.89%	1,450	35.78%	84	2.07%	335	8.27%	0	0.00%	734	18.11%	4,053
Inyo	345	53.41%	283	43.81%	9	1.39%	0	0.00%	9	1.39%	62	9.60%	646
Kern	598	42.02%	798	56.08%	6	0.42%	21	1.48%	0	0.00%	-200	-14.05%	1,423
Lake	588	42.27%	798	57.37%	2	0.14%	3	0.22%	0	0.00%	-210	-15.10%	1,391
Lassen	384	46.77%	415	50.55%	20	2.44%	2	0.24%	0	0.00%	-31	-3.78%	821
Los Angeles	5,595	51.67%	4,683	43.24%	343	3.17%	208	1.92%	0	0.00%	912	8.42%	10,829
Marin	851	53.62%	727	45.81%	7	0.44%	2	0.13%	0	0.00%	124	7.81%	1,587
Mariposa	474	42.74%	618	55.73%	17	1.53%	0	0.00%	0	0.00%	-144	-12.98%	1,109
Mendocino	1,317	43.71%	1,589	52.74%	79	2.62%	28	0.93%	0	0.00%	-272	-9.03%	3,013
Merced	809	45.47%	953	53.57%	16	0.90%	1	0.06%	0	0.00%	-144	-8.09%	1,779
Modoc	478	42.68%	609	54.38%	33	2.95%	0	0.00%	0	0.00%	-131	-11.70%	1,120
Mono	598	58.57%	381	37.32%	12	1.18%	30	2.94%	0	0.00%	217	21.25%	1,021
Monterey	1,476	50.72%	1,381	47.46%	40	1.37%	13	0.45%	0	0.00%	95	3.26%	2,910
Napa	1,593	55.37%	1,256	43.66%	19	0.66%	9	0.31%	0	0.00%	337	11.71%	2,877
Nevada	2,368	56.13%	1,791	42.45%	50	1.19%	10	0.24%	0	0.00%	577	13.68%	4,219
Placer	1,749	52.89%	1,483	44.84%	70	2.12%	5	0.15%	0	0.00%	266	8.04%	3,307
Plumas	712	55.84%	554	43.45%	8	0.63%	1	0.08%	0	0.00%	158	12.39%	1,275
Sacramento	4,367	60.15%	2,659	36.63%	92	1.27%	142	1.96%	0	0.00%	1,708	23.53%	7,260
San Benito	574	44.88%	665	51.99%	38	2.97%	2	0.16%	0	0.00%	-91	-7.11%	1,279
San Bernardino	1,617	54.37%	1,288	43.31%	47	1.58%	22	0.74%	0	0.00%	329	11.06%	2,974
San Diego	1,120	57.00%	800	40.71%	40	2.04%	5	0.25%	0	0.00%	320	16.28%	1,965
San Francisco	25,509	53.46%	21,202	44.43%	99	0.21%	622	1.30%	287	0.60%	4,307	9.03%	47,719
San Joaquin	3,079	50.32%	2,898	47.36%	141	2.30%	1	0.02%	0	0.00%	181	2.96%	6,119
San Luis Obispo	1,233	51.44%	1,069	44.60%	73	3.05%	22	0.92%	0	0.00%	164	6.84%	2,397
San Mateo	950	55.33%	750	43.68%	12	0.70%	5	0.29%	0	0.00%	200	11.65%	1,717
Santa Barbara	1,243	50.92%	1,050	43.02%	118	4.83%	30	1.23%	0	0.00%	193	7.91%	2,441
Santa Clara	3,840	52.91%	3,172	43.70%	162	2.23%	84	1.16%	0	0.00%	668	9.20%	7,258
Santa Cruz	1,667	53.69%	1,365	43.96%	45	1.45%	28	0.90%	0	0.00%	302	9.73%	3,105
Shasta	1,173	51.54%	1,042	45.78%	45	1.98%	16	0.70%	0	0.00%	131	5.76%	2,276
Sierra	1,064	65.12%	554	33.90%	16	0.98%	0	0.00%	0	0.00%	510	31.21%	1,634
Siskiyou	886	45.58%	1,036	53.29%	1	0.05%	20	1.03%	1	0.05%	-150	-7.72%	1,944
Solano	2,382	53.61%	1,977	44.50%	69	1.55%	15	0.34%	0	0.00%	405	9.12%	4,443
Sonoma	3,044	49.42%	2,944	47.79%	113	1.83%	59	0.96%	0	0.00%	100	1.62%	6,160
Stanislaus	979	39.49%	1,424	57.44%	69	2.78%	7	0.28%	0	0.00%	-445	-17.95%	2,479
Sutter	675	48.60%	635	45.72%	77	5.54%	2	0.14%	0	0.00%	40	2.88%	1,389
Tehama	1,075	47.80%	1,146	50.96%	27	1.20%	1	0.04%	0	0.00%	-71	-3.16%	2,249
Trinity	435	50.29%	418	48.32%	6	0.69%	6	0.69%	0	0.00%	17	1.97%	865
Tulare	1,268	40.15%	1,691	53.55%	115	3.64%	84	2.66%	0	0.00%	-423	-13.39%	3,158
Tuolumne	1,040	53.20%	870	44.50%	45	2.30%	0	0.00%	0	0.00%	170	8.70%	1,955
Ventura	749	53.96%	603	43.44%	20	1.44%	16	1.15%	0	0.00%	146	10.52%	1,388
Yolo	1,412	48.74%	1,421	49.05%	62	2.14%	2	0.07%	0	0.00%	-9	-0.31%	2,897
Yuba	1,214	52.55%	1,047	45.32%	40	1.73%	9	0.39%	0	0.00%	167	7.23%	2,310
Total	102,416	51.98%	89,288	45.32%	2,963	1.50%	2,037	1.03%	329	0.17%	13,128	6.66%	197,033

==== Counties that flipped from Democratic to Republican ====
- Butte
- Del Norte
- San Francisco
- Shasta
- Sonoma
- Tuolumne
- Yuba

==== Counties that flipped from Republican to Democratic ====
- Lassen

== See also ==
- United States presidential elections in California
