= 1852 United States presidential election in California =

- November 2, 1852

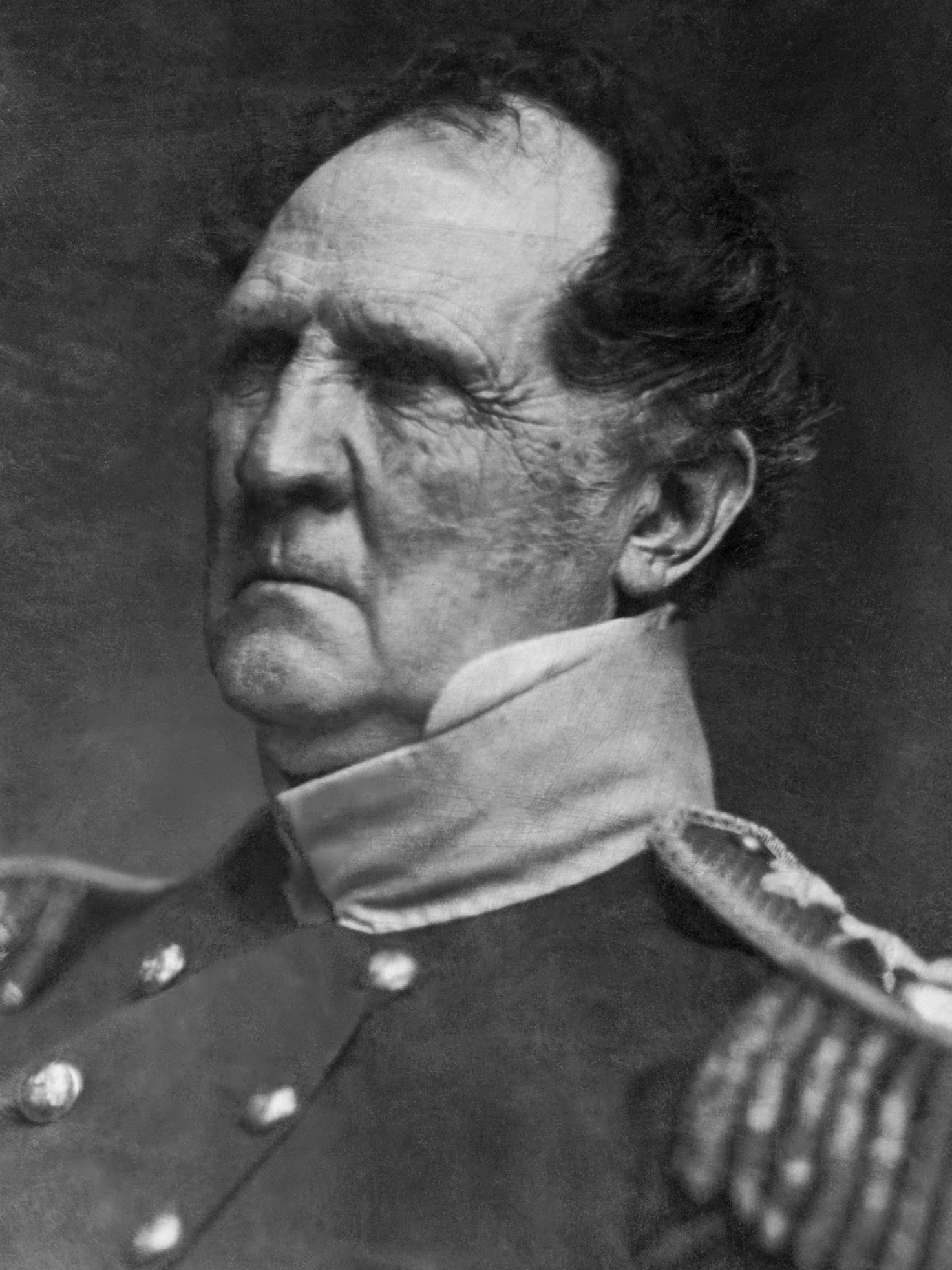
Nominee	Franklin Pierce	Winfield Scott
Party	Democratic	Whig
Home state	New Hampshire	New Jersey
Running mate	William R. King	William Alexander Graham
Electoral vote	4	0
Popular vote	40,885	36,052
Percentage	53.06%	46.78%
County results
Pierce
50–60%
60–70%
80–90%
Scott
50–60%
90–100%
Unknown/No Vote
President before election
Millard Fillmore
Whig
Elected President
Franklin Pierce
Democratic

The 1852 United States presidential election in California was held on November 2, 1852, as part of the 1852 United States presidential election. Voters chose four representatives, or electors to the Electoral College, who voted for president and vice president.

This was California's first presidential election, following its admission as the 31st state on September 9, 1850. The Democratic nominee, New Hampshire Senator Franklin Pierce, won the state, defeating the Whig nominee, United States Army General Winfield Scott.

Pierce won the state by a margin of 6.27%.

== Results ==
General Election Results
Party	Pledged to	Elector	Votes
Democratic Party	Franklin Pierce	W. S. Sherwood	40,885 (Note: This stated total seems likely to be a mistake; the county figures add up to 40,585)
Democratic Party	Franklin Pierce	Andreas Pico	40,573
Democratic Party	Franklin Pierce	T. J. Henley	40,572
Democratic Party	Franklin Pierce	J. W. Gregory	40,507
Whig Party	Winfield Scott	J. C. Fall	36,052 (Note: This stated total seems likely to be a mistake; the county figures add up to 35,752)
Whig Party	Winfield Scott	D. H. Haskell	35,789
Whig Party	Winfield Scott	T. D. Johns	35,752
Whig Party	Winfield Scott	J. E. Hale	35,731
Free Soil Party	John Hale	Asa D. Hatch	66
Free Soil Party	John Hale	Asa Walker	66
Free Soil Party	John Hale	J. Bryant Hill	65
Free Soil Party	John Hale	J. A. Lloyd	65
Write-in		Scattering	56
Votes cast (Note: Based on totals for highest elector on each ticket)			77,059

=== Results by county ===
County	Franklin Pierce Democratic		Winfield Scott Whig		John Hale Free Soil		Scattering Write-in		Margin		Total votes cast (Note: Based on highest elector on each ticket)
County	#	%	#	%	#	%	#	%	#	%	Total votes cast
Butte	1,741	54.09%	1,478	45.91%	0	0.00%	0	0.00%	263	8.17%	3,219
Calaveras	2,838	55.29%	2,288	44.57%	6	0.12%	1	0.02%	550	10.71%	5,133
Colusa	232	50.66%	226	49.34%	0	0.00%	0	0.00%	6	1.31%	458
Contra Costa	590	58.82%	413	41.18%	0	0.00%	0	0.00%	177	17.65%	1,003
El Dorado	6,106	54.24%	5,144	45.69%	0	0.00%	8	0.07%	962	8.55%	11,258
Klamath	210	49.18%	217	50.82%	0	0.00%	0	0.00%	-7	-1.64%	427
Los Angeles	574	53.64%	496	46.36%	0	0.00%	0	0.00%	78	7.29%	1,070
Marin	137	48.58%	145	51.42%	0	0.00%	0	0.00%	-8	-2.84%	282
Mariposa	1,292	60.21%	854	39.79%	0	0.00%	0	0.00%	438	20.41%	2,146
Monterey	273	83.49%	54	16.51%	0	0.00%	0	0.00%	219	66.97%	327
Napa	267	56.93%	202	43.07%	0	0.00%	0	0.00%	65	13.86%	469
Nevada	2,855	52.17%	2,618	47.83%	0	0.00%	0	0.00%	237	4.33%	5,473
Placer	2,830	55.46%	2,273	44.54%	0	0.00%	0	0.00%	557	10.92%	5,103
Sacramento	3,279	47.43%	3,635	52.57%	0	0.00%	0	0.00%	-356	-5.15%	6,914
San Diego	105	49.53%	107	50.47%	0	0.00%	0	0.00%	-2	-0.94%	212
San Francisco	4,241	50.11%	4,162	49.18%	55	0.65%	5	0.06%	79	0.93%	8,463
San Joaquin	1,198	50.74%	1,159	49.09%	4	0.17%	0	0.00%	39	1.65%	2,361
San Luis Obispo	11	8.94%	112	91.06%	0	0.00%	0	0.00%	-101	-82.11%	123
Santa Barbara	104	59.43%	68	38.86%	0	0.00%	3	1.71%	36	20.57%	175
Santa Clara	780	48.42%	831	51.58%	0	0.00%	0	0.00%	-51	-3.17%	1,611
Santa Cruz	306	62.20%	186	37.80%	0	0.00%	0	0.00%	120	24.39%	492
Shasta	971	56.19%	757	43.81%	0	0.00%	0	0.00%	214	12.38%	1,728
Sierra	1,619	54.57%	1,438	45.43%	0	0.00%	0	0.00%	271	9.13%	2,967
Siskiyou	492	51.68%	459	48.21%	1	0.11%	0	0.00%	33	3.47%	952
Solano	355	53.54%	308	46.46%	0	0.00%	0	0.00%	47	7.09%	663
Sonoma (Note: Includes Mendocino County)	474	63.97%	267	36.03%	0	0.00%	0	0.00%	207	27.94%	741
Sutter	205	48.93%	214	51.07%	0	0.00%	0	0.00%	-9	-2.15%	419
Trinity (Note: Not including the votes from Union Township which arrived late. These votes were not listed on the statewide canvass although they are listed on the county return.)	784	53.44%	683	46.56%	0	0.00%	0	0.00%	101	6.88%	1,467
Tulare	40	55.56%	32	44.44%	0	0.00%	0	0.00%	8	11.11%	72
Tuolumne	3,131	54.82%	2,541	44.49%	0	0.00%	39	0.68%	590	10.33%	5,711
Yolo	350	46.79%	398	53.21%	0	0.00%	0	0.00%	-48	-6.42%	748
Yuba	2,195	51.38%	2,077	48.62%	0	0.00%	0	0.00%	118	2.76%	4,272
Total	40,885 (Note: The county figures add up to 40,585)	53.06%	36,052 (Note: The county figures add up to 35,752)	46.78%	66	0.09%	56	0.07%	4,833	6.27%	77,059

== See also ==
- United States presidential elections in California
