= 1856 United States presidential election in California =

- November 4, 1856
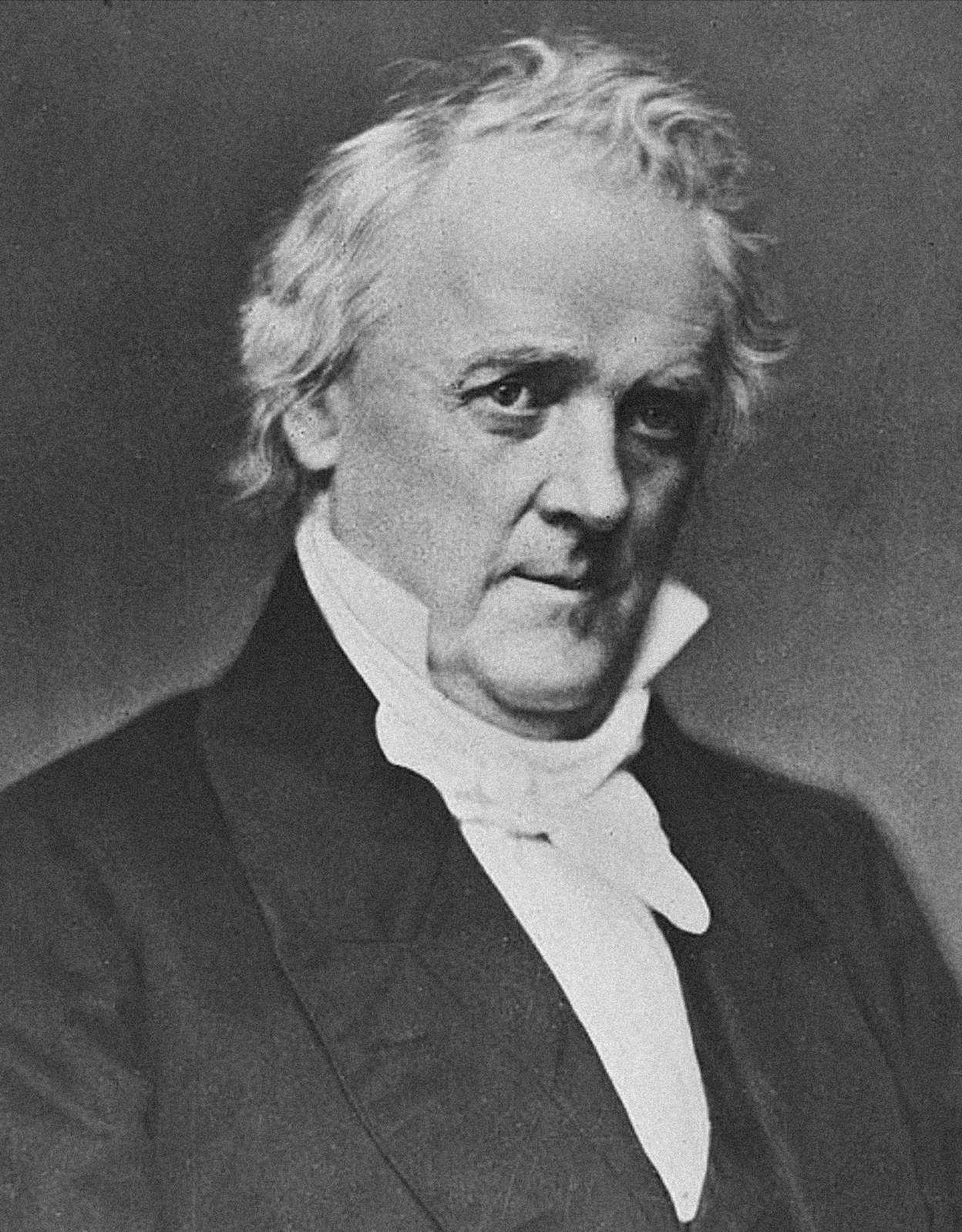

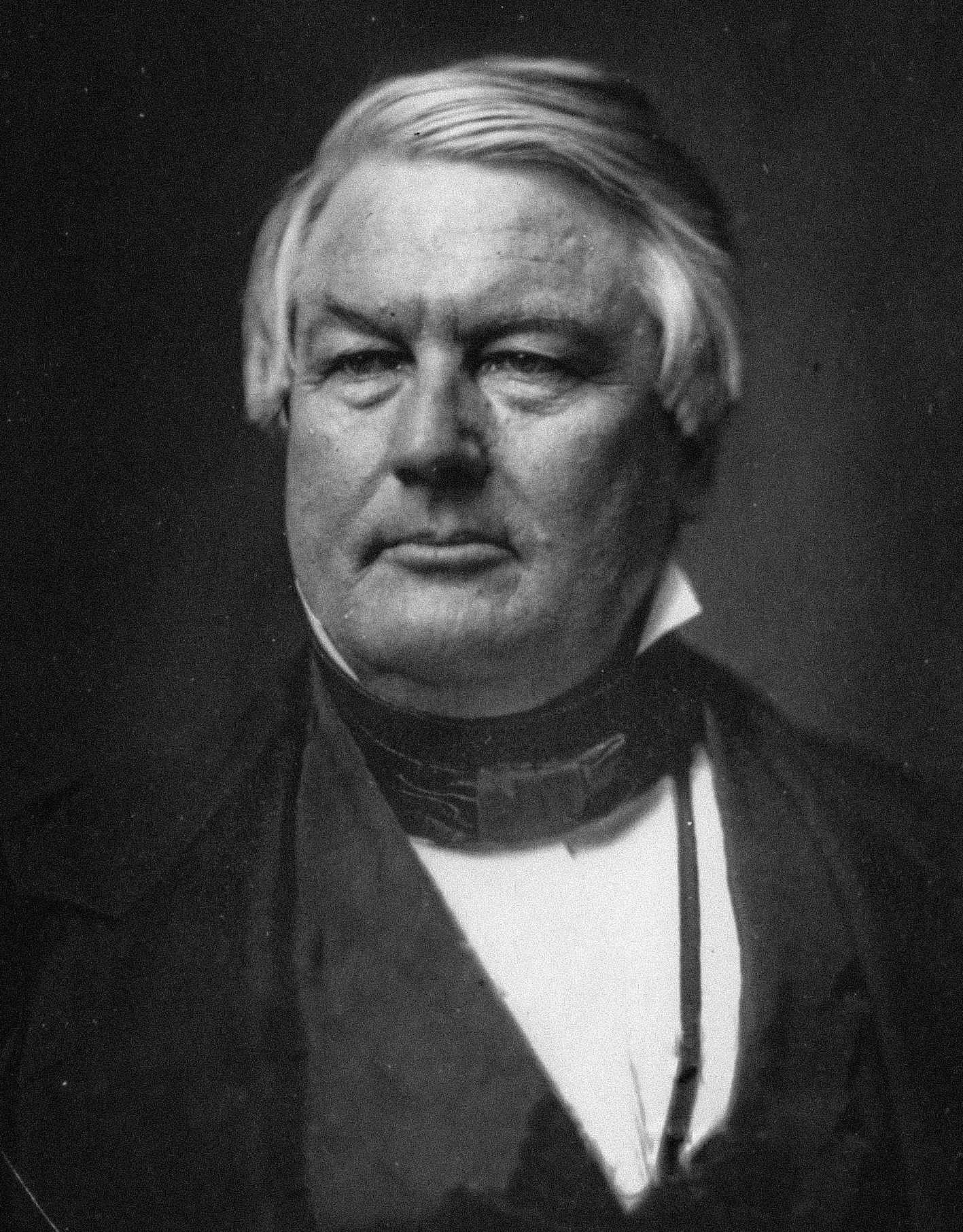

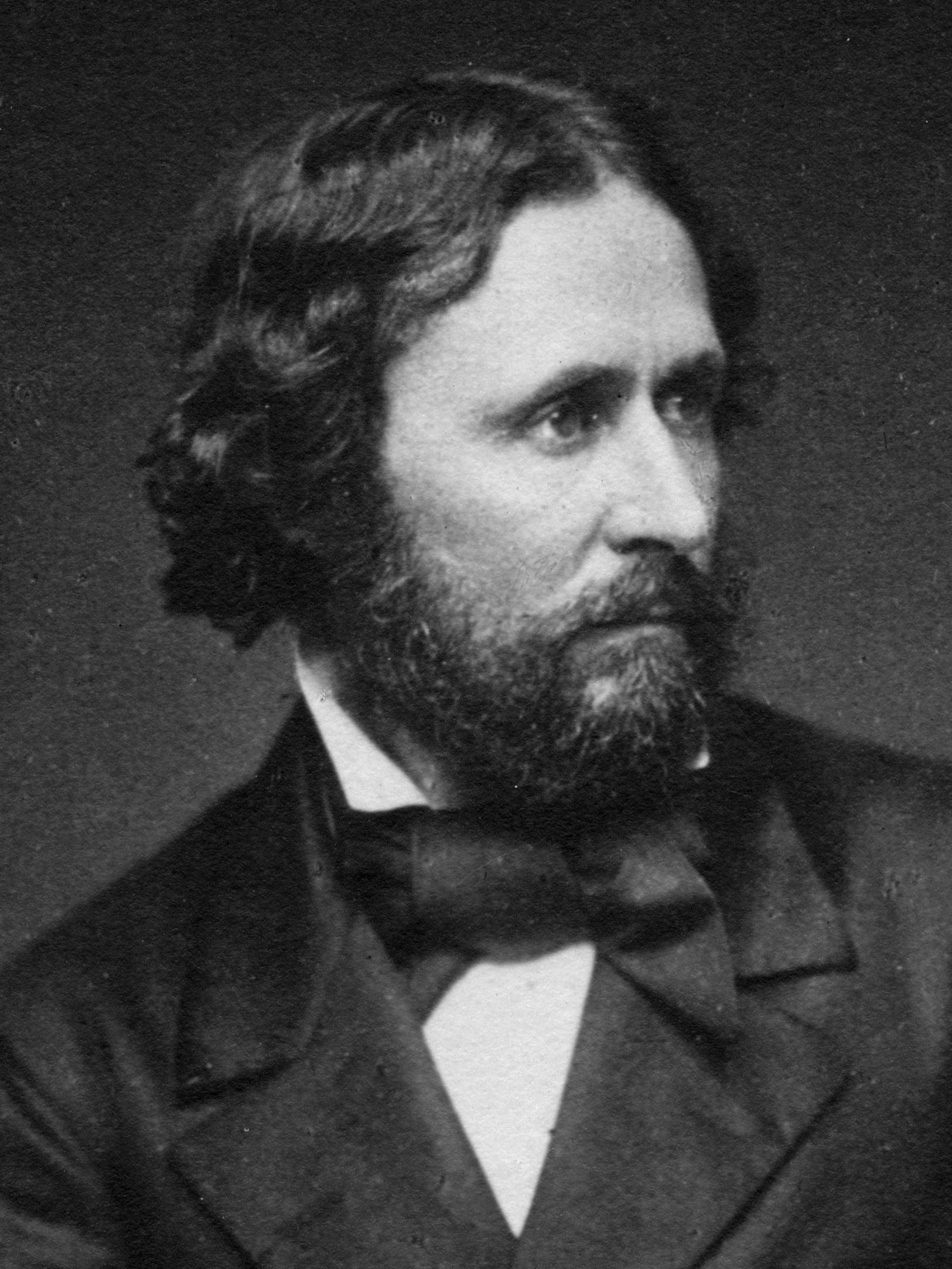
Nominee	James Buchanan	Millard Fillmore	John C. Frémont
Party	Democratic	Know Nothing	Republican
Home state	Pennsylvania	New York	California
Running mate	John C. Breckinridge	Andrew Jackson Donelson	William L. Dayton
Electoral vote	4	0	0
Popular vote	52,534	35,733	20,622
Percentage	48.02%	32.67%	18.85%
County results
Buchanan
30–40%
40–50%
50–60%
60–70%
70–80%
Frémont
30–40%
40–50%
50–60%
Fillmore
40–50%
Unknown/No Vote
President before election
Franklin Pierce
Democratic
Elected President
James Buchanan
Democratic

The 1856 United States presidential election in California took place on November 4, 1856, as part of the 1856 United States presidential election. Voters chose four representatives, or electors to the Electoral College, who voted for president and vice president. California voted for the Democratic nominee, former Secretary of State James Buchanan, over the American Party nominee, former Whig President Millard Fillmore, and the Republican nominee, former U.S. Senator and Military Governor of California John C. Frémont.

None of the three candidates took to the stump. The Republican Party opposed the extension of slavery into the territories — in fact, its slogan was "Free speech, free press, free soil, free men, Frémont and victory!" The Republicans thus crusaded against the Slave Power, warning it was destroying republican values. Democrats counter-crusaded by warning that a Republican victory would bring a civil war.

The Republican platform opposed the repeal of the Missouri Compromise through the Kansas–Nebraska Act, which enacted the policy of popular sovereignty, allowing settlers to decide whether a new state would enter the Union as free or slave. The Republicans also accused the Pierce administration of allowing a fraudulent territorial government to be imposed upon the citizens of the Kansas Territory, thus engendering the violence that had raged in Bleeding Kansas. They advocated the immediate admittance of Kansas as a free state. Along with opposing the spread of slavery into the continental territories of the United States, the party also opposed the Ostend Manifesto, which advocated the annexation of Cuba from Spain. In sum, the campaign's true focus was against the system of slavery, which they felt was destroying the Republican values that the Union had been founded upon.

The Democratic platform supported the Kansas-Nebraska Act and popular sovereignty. The party supported the pro-slavery territorial legislature elected in Kansas, opposed the free-state elements within Kansas, and castigated the Topeka Constitution as an illegal document written during an illegal convention. The Democrats also supported the plan to annex Cuba, advocated in the Ostend Manifesto, which Buchanan helped devise while serving as minister to Britain. The most influential aspect of the Democratic campaign was a warning that a Republican victory would lead to the secession of numerous southern states.

This would prove the last occasion the Democratic Party carried Alameda County until Franklin Delano Roosevelt in 1932, the last in which the Democrats carried Santa Cruz County and Placer County until Woodrow Wilson in 1916, and the last when Napa, Solano (Note: "Southern Democrat" John Breckinridge did carry Solano County in 1860) and Marin Counties voted Democratic until Wilson in 1912. California's electoral votes would not be again carried by the Democratic Party until 1880.

== Results ==
General Election Results (Note: These are the totals listed on the microfilmed state canvass at the State Archives. Based on newspaper reporting in early December 1856, it seems that the returns from nine counties failed to arrive in time and were not counted in the original certification by the Secretary of State. The totals on the canvass at the Archives includes these counties, except for Klamath.)
Party	Pledged to	Elector	Votes
Democratic Party	James Buchanan	A. C. Bradford	52,534
Democratic Party	James Buchanan	George Freanor	52,532
Democratic Party	James Buchanan	P. Della Torre	52,525
Democratic Party	James Buchanan	Augustin Olivera	52,516
American Party	Millard Fillmore	Balie Peyton	35,733
American Party	Millard Fillmore	R. N. Wood	35,727
American Party	Millard Fillmore	O. C. Hall	35,694
American Party	Millard Fillmore	J. S. Pitzer	35,688
Republican Party	John C. Frémont	Alexander Bell	20,622
Republican Party	John C. Frémont	F. P. Tracy	20,613
Republican Party	John C. Frémont	Lewis G. Gunn	20,612
Republican Party	John C. Frémont	C. N. Ormsby	20,595
Write-in		Scattering	502
Votes cast (Note: Based on totals for highest elector on each ticket)			91,387

=== Results by county ===
County	James Buchanan Democratic		Millard Fillmore American		John C. Frémont Republican		Scattering Write-in		Margin		Total votes cast (Note: Based on highest elector on each ticket)
County	#	%	#	%	#	%	#	%	#	%	Total votes cast
Alameda	729	43.78%	213	12.79%	723	43.42%	0	0.00%	6 (Note: Margin over Frémont)	0.36%	1,665
Amador	1,784	44.58%	1,557	38.91%	657	16.42%	4	0.10%	227	5.67%	4,002
Butte	2,501	50.56%	1,702	34.40%	744	15.04%	0	0.00%	799	16.15%	4,947
Calaveras	2,615	50.49%	1,515	29.25%	561	10.83%	488	9.42%	1,100	21.24%	5,179
Colusa (Note: This county's return arrived late)	289	47.22%	305	49.84%	18	2.94%	0	0.00%	-16	-2.61%	612
Contra Costa	457	48.62%	293	31.17%	190	20.21%	0	0.00%	164	17.45%	940
El Dorado	4,048	48.20%	2,959	35.23%	1,391	16.56%	0	0.00%	1,089	12.97%	8,398
Fresno	218	63.56%	124	36.15%	1	0.29%	0	0.00%	94	27.41%	343
Humboldt	204	40.96%	191	38.35%	103	20.68%	0	0.00%	13	2.61%	498
Los Angeles	722	52.36%	135	9.79%	522	37.85%	0	0.00%	200	14.50%	1,379
Marin	350	60.03%	82	14.07%	151	25.90%	0	0.00%	199	34.13%	583
Mariposa	1,255	57.28%	771	35.19%	165	7.53%	0	0.00%	484	22.09%	2,191
Merced	249	64.34%	124	32.04%	14	3.62%	0	0.00%	125	32.30%	387
Monterey	266	40.67%	169	25.84%	219	33.49%	0	0.00%	47	7.19%	654
Napa	444	47.13%	340	36.09%	158	16.77%	0	0.00%	104	11.04%	942
Nevada	3,498	48.58%	2,240	31.11%	1,462	20.31%	0	0.00%	1,258	17.47%	7,200
Placer	2,807	47.62%	2,096	35.56%	992	16.83%	0	0.00%	711	12.06%	5,895
Plumas	1,124	50.95%	865	39.21%	217	9.84%	0	0.00%	259	11.74%	2,206
Sacramento	3,437	44.23%	3,387	43.59%	939	12.08%	7	0.09%	50	0.64%	7,770
San Bernardino	314	75.85%	7	1.69%	93	22.46%	0	0.00%	221	53.38%	414
San Diego	172	75.44%	38	16.67%	18	7.89%	0	0.00%	134	58.77%	228
San Francisco	5,334	44.33%	1,601	13.31%	5,097	42.36%	0	0.00%	237	1.97%	12,032
San Joaquin	1,288	44.80%	1,040	36.17%	547	19.03%	0	0.00%	248	8.63%	2,875
San Luis Obispo	83	40.49%	15	7.32%	107	52.20%	0	0.00%	-24	-11.71%	205
San Mateo	282	44.55%	113	17.85%	238	37.60%	0	0.00%	44	6.95%	633
Santa Barbara	175	47.55%	10	2.72%	183	49.73%	0	0.00%	-8	-2.17%	368
Santa Clara	576	27.97%	674	32.73%	809	39.29%	0	0.00%	-135 (Note: Margin over Fillmore)	-6.56%	2,059
Santa Cruz	320	39.80%	288	35.82%	196	24.38%	0	0.00%	32	3.98%	804
Shasta	1,537	55.11%	1,083	38.83%	169	6.06%	0	0.00%	454	16.28%	2,789
Sierra	2,504	46.37%	2,203	40.80%	693	12.83%	0	0.00%	301	5.57%	5,400
Siskiyou	2,072	47.90%	1,790	41.38%	464	10.73%	0	0.00%	282	6.52%	4,326
Solano	799	49.20%	634	39.04%	190	11.70%	1	0.06%	165	10.16%	1,624
Sonoma (Note: Includes Mendocino County)	1,519	63.32%	498	20.76%	382	15.92%	0	0.00%	1,021	42.56%	2,399
Stanislaus	436	63.46%	228	33.19%	21	3.06%	2	0.29%	208	30.28%	687
Sutter	491	52.80%	347	37.31%	92	9.89%	0	0.00%	144	15.48%	930
Tehama	436	55.05%	312	39.39%	44	5.56%	0	0.00%	124	15.66%	792
Trinity	1,011	48.58%	882	42.38%	188	9.03%	0	0.00%	129	6.20%	2,081
Tulare	248	60.49%	139	33.90%	23	5.61%	0	0.00%	109	26.59%	410
Tuolumne	2,935	48.06%	2,113	34.60%	1,059	17.34%	0	0.00%	822	13.46%	6,107
Yolo	553	43.68%	583	46.05%	130	10.27%	0	0.00%	-30	-2.37%	1,266
Yuba	2,451	47.23%	2,087	40.21%	652	12.56%	0	0.00%	364	7.01%	5,190
Total	52,534 (Note: The county figures add up to 52,533)	48.02%	35,733 (Note: The county figures add up to 35,753)	32.67%	20,622	18.85%	502	0.46%	16,801	15.36%	109,391

==== Counties that flipped from Whig to Democratic ====
- Klamath
- Sacramento
- Marin
- San Diego
- Sutter

==== Counties that flipped from Democratic to Know Nothing ====
- Colusa

==== Counties that flipped from Whig to Know Nothing ====
- Yolo

==== Counties that flipped from Democratic to Republican ====
- Santa Barbara

==== Counties that flipped from Whig to Republican ====
- San Luis Obispo
- Santa Clara

== See also ==
- United States presidential elections in California
