= 1944 United States presidential election in California =

- November 7, 1944
- Turnout: 86.13% (of registered voters) ▲4.69 pp 65.72% (of eligible voters) ▼12.6 pp

Nominee	Franklin D. Roosevelt	Thomas E. Dewey
Party	Democratic	Republican
Home state	New York	New York
Running mate	Harry S. Truman	John W. Bricker
Electoral vote	25	0
Popular vote	1,988,564	1,512,965
Percentage	56.48%	42.97%
County results
Roosevelt
40–50%
50–60%
60–70%
Dewey
40–50%
50–60%
60–70%
President before election
Franklin D. Roosevelt
Democratic
Elected President
Franklin D. Roosevelt
Democratic

The 1944 United States presidential election in California took place on November 7, 1944, as part of the 1944 United States presidential election. State voters chose 25 representatives, or electors, to the Electoral College, who voted for president and vice president. California voted for the Democratic incumbent, Franklin Roosevelt, in a landslide over the Republican challenger, New York Governor Thomas E. Dewey.

Democrats would not win San Diego County again until 1992.

== Results ==
1944 United States presidential election in California
Party	Candidate	Votes	Percentage	Electoral votes
Democratic	Franklin D. Roosevelt (incumbent)	1,988,564	56.48%	25
Republican	Thomas E. Dewey	1,512,965	42.97%	0
Prohibition	Claude A. Watson	14,770	0.42%	0
No Party	Norman Thomas (write-in)	2,515	0.07%	0
No Party	Darlington Hoopes (write-in)	1,408	0.04%	0
No Party	Edward A. Teichert (write-in)	180	0.01%	0
No Party	Arla A. Albaugh (write-in)	147	0.00%	0
No Party	Scattering	326	0.01%	0
Invalid or blank votes				—
Totals		3,520,875	100.00%	25
Voter turnout				—

=== Results by county ===
County	Franklin D. Roosevelt Democratic		Thomas E. Dewey Republican		Claude A. Watson Prohibition		Scattering Write-in (Note: Includes votes for Thomas, Hoopes, Teichert, and Albaugh)		Margin		Total votes cast
County	#	%	#	%	#	%	#	%	#	%	Total votes cast
Alameda	169,631	57.70%	122,982	41.83%	721	0.25%	653 (Note: 375 for Thomas, 202 for Hoopes, 28 for Teichert, 25 for Albaugh, 23 Scattering)	0.22%	46,649	15.87%	293,987
Alpine	45	31.47%	98	68.53%	0	0.00%	0	0.00%	-53	-37.06%	143
Amador	1,976	61.69%	1,191	37.18%	36	1.12%	0	0.00%	785	24.51%	3,203
Butte	8,811	52.55%	7,852	46.83%	105	0.63%	0	0.00%	959	5.72%	16,768
Calaveras	1,893	56.19%	1,455	43.19%	21	0.62%	0	0.00%	438	13.00%	3,369
Colusa	2,090	56.81%	1,579	42.92%	10	0.27%	0	0.00%	511	13.89%	3,679
Contra Costa	47,831	63.96%	26,816	35.86%	138	0.18%	0	0.00%	21,015	28.10%	74,785
Del Norte	818	44.70%	1,011	55.25%	1	0.05%	0	0.00%	-193	-10.55%	1,830
El Dorado	3,016	59.95%	1,990	39.55%	25	0.50%	0	0.00%	1,026	20.39%	5,031
Fresno	40,769	63.84%	22,668	35.50%	425	0.67%	0	0.00%	18,101	28.34%	63,862
Glenn	2,452	50.20%	2,409	49.32%	23	0.47%	0	0.00%	43	0.88%	4,884
Humboldt	12,083	56.83%	9,127	42.93%	50	0.24%	0	0.00%	2,956	13.90%	21,260
Imperial	5,085	45.76%	5,979	53.81%	48	0.43%	0	0.00%	-894	-8.05%	11,112
Inyo	1,647	49.09%	1,699	50.64%	9	0.27%	0	0.00%	-52	-1.55%	3,355
Kern	26,205	55.56%	20,730	43.96%	206	0.44%	20 (Note: 20 Scattering)	0.04%	5,475	11.61%	47,161
Kings	6,591	65.04%	3,468	34.22%	75	0.74%	0	0.00%	3,123	30.82%	10,134
Lake	1,671	44.61%	2,059	54.97%	16	0.43%	0	0.00%	-388	-10.36%	3,746
Lassen	3,678	65.81%	1,896	33.92%	15	0.27%	0	0.00%	1,782	31.88%	5,589
Los Angeles	886,252	56.75%	666,441	42.68%	6,081	0.39%	2,790 (Note: 1,513 for Thomas, 884 for Hoopes, 145 for Teichert, 122 for Albaugh, 126 Scattering)	0.18%	219,811	14.08%	1,561,564
Madera	4,276	59.47%	2,865	39.85%	49	0.68%	0	0.00%	1,411	19.62%	7,190
Marin	14,516	52.04%	13,304	47.69%	32	0.11%	44 (Note: 35 for Thomas, 9 Scattering)	0.16%	1,212	4.34%	27,896
Mariposa	1,203	55.06%	965	44.16%	17	0.78%	0	0.00%	238	10.89%	2,185
Mendocino	5,452	53.75%	4,655	45.89%	32	0.32%	4 (Note: 3 for Thomas, 1 for Hoopes)	0.04%	797	7.86%	10,143
Merced	9,192	58.25%	6,518	41.31%	69	0.44%	0	0.00%	2,674	16.95%	15,779
Modoc	1,540	54.28%	1,288	45.40%	9	0.32%	0	0.00%	252	8.88%	2,837
Mono	242	38.97%	378	60.87%	1	0.16%	0	0.00%	-136	-21.90%	621
Monterey	14,342	53.66%	12,246	45.82%	106	0.40%	34 (Note: 34 Scattering)	0.13%	2,096	7.84%	26,728
Napa	7,748	51.87%	7,092	47.48%	81	0.54%	15 (Note: 6 for Thomas, 9 Scattering)	0.10%	656	4.39%	14,936
Nevada	3,266	54.79%	2,648	44.42%	47	0.79%	0	0.00%	618	10.37%	5,961
Orange	28,649	42.47%	38,394	56.92%	407	0.60%	0	0.00%	-9,745	-14.45%	67,450
Placer	7,149	62.66%	4,196	36.78%	64	0.56%	0	0.00%	2,953	25.88%	11,409
Plumas	2,625	69.83%	1,126	29.95%	8	0.21%	0	0.00%	1,499	39.88%	3,759
Riverside	19,439	45.26%	23,168	53.94%	346	0.81%	0	0.00%	-3,729	-8.68%	42,953
Sacramento	49,204	66.30%	24,611	33.16%	343	0.46%	60 (Note: 60 Scattering)	0.08%	24,593	33.14%	74,218
San Benito	1,998	46.82%	2,253	52.80%	16	0.37%	0	0.00%	-255	-5.98%	4,267
San Bernardino	38,530	52.59%	34,084	46.52%	646	0.88%	0	0.00%	4,446	6.07%	73,260
San Diego	89,959	53.94%	75,746	45.42%	777	0.47%	282 (Note: 186 for Thomas, 96 for Hoopes)	0.17%	14,213	8.52%	166,764
San Francisco	208,609	60.51%	134,163	38.92%	1,613	0.47%	346 (Note: 173 for Thomas, 173 for Hoopes)	0.10%	74,446	21.60%	344,731
San Joaquin	27,074	52.48%	24,357	47.21%	125	0.24%	32 (Note: 32 for Thomas)	0.06%	2,717	5.27%	51,588
San Luis Obispo	8,068	50.63%	7,793	48.90%	75	0.47%	0	0.00%	275	1.73%	15,936
San Mateo	34,594	50.62%	33,590	49.15%	158	0.23%	0	0.00%	1,004	1.47%	68,342
Santa Barbara	15,721	53.37%	13,647	46.33%	89	0.30%	0	0.00%	2,074	7.04%	29,457
Santa Clara	43,869	52.36%	39,409	47.04%	297	0.35%	202 (Note: 148 for Thomas, 39 for Hoopes, 7 for Teichert, 8 Scattering)	0.24%	4,460	5.32%	83,777
Santa Cruz	9,357	45.34%	11,102	53.80%	164	0.79%	14 (Note: 14 Scattering)	0.07%	-1,745	-8.46%	20,637
Shasta	5,798	58.90%	4,023	40.87%	22	0.22%	0	0.00%	1,775	18.03%	9,843
Sierra	662	59.64%	443	39.91%	5	0.45%	0	0.00%	219	19.73%	1,110
Siskiyou	5,914	57.29%	4,351	42.15%	58	0.56%	0	0.00%	1,563	15.14%	10,323
Solano	24,335	69.93%	10,361	29.77%	105	0.30%	0	0.00%	13,974	40.15%	34,801
Sonoma	15,949	49.27%	16,309	50.38%	85	0.26%	26 (Note: 22 for Thomas, 4 Scattering)	0.08%	-360	-1.11%	32,369
Stanislaus	15,537	51.33%	14,297	47.23%	399	1.32%	38 (Note: 22 for Thomas, 13 for Hoopes, 3 Scattering)	0.13%	1,240	4.10%	30,271
Sutter	3,083	49.54%	3,111	49.99%	29	0.47%	0	0.00%	-28	-0.45%	6,223
Tehama	3,130	51.53%	2,903	47.79%	41	0.68%	0	0.00%	227	3.74%	6,074
Trinity	770	57.33%	567	42.22%	6	0.45%	0	0.00%	203	15.12%	1,343
Tulare	16,221	49.97%	16,005	49.30%	238	0.73%	0	0.00%	216	0.67%	32,464
Tuolumne	2,566	57.51%	1,864	41.77%	16	0.36%	16 (Note: 16 Scattering)	0.36%	702	15.73%	4,462
Ventura	16,342	59.33%	11,071	40.19%	131	0.48%	0	0.00%	5,271	19.14%	27,544
Yolo	5,837	57.70%	4,233	41.84%	46	0.45%	0	0.00%	1,604	15.86%	10,116
Yuba	3,254	57.63%	2,379	42.14%	13	0.23%	0	0.00%	875	15.50%	5,646
Total	1,988,564	56.48%	1,512,965	42.97%	14,770	0.42%	4,576	0.13%	475,599	13.51%	3,520,875

==== Counties that flipped from Democratic to Republican ====
- Imperial
- Inyo
- Mono
- San Benito
- Sutter

=== Electors ===
Franklin D. Roosevelt & Harry S. Truman Democratic Party	Thomas E. Dewey & John W. Bricker Republican Party	Claude A. Watson & Andrew Johnson Prohibition Party
L. G. Hitchcock; Gertrude V. Clark; Angus Madden; Jerome Politzer; Lucretia del Valle Grady; William H. Hollander; James K. Moffit; Thomas S. Barclay; Sam L. Heisinger; Cammie B. Haden; A. Edwin Fisher; Clayton L. Howland; Cornelius J. Haggerty; John B. Pelletier; Anna Brownyard; Lucile Webster Gleason; Vincent Thomas; Ralph C. Dills; Elwyn S. Bennett; Zachary T. Malaby; Allen Miller; Claudia Worswick; Vincent T. Godfrey; Augustus F. Hawkins; James G. Thimmes	Earl Warren; Mary Pickford Rogers; Edward H. Tickle; Edward Arnold; William F. Reichel; Walter E. Disney; Jeannette P. Andross; Milton D. Sapiro; Edward B. Baron; P. M. Sanford; James H. Quinn; Gerald R. Johnson; George Hallock; Mrs. Randolph Madison; Charles G. Connors; S. F. B. Morse; William Nickerson Jr.; Raymond Haight; Sue C. Weiss; Leo E. Anderson; John S. Barcome; Keith Spaulding; Gwendolyn Smith; Fern L. Young; James R. Scott	Gilbert O. Hudson; Fred L. Robinson; Louise J. Taft; John B. Lord; Ida B. Stein; Rowena Pestana; Jesse W. Farr; Stanley B. Paul; William H. Easterling; Alfred Randall; Mrs. J. H. Van Tassel; Iner S. Christensen; Harold Daniels; W. T. Rutledge; George C. Post; Fred M. Barney; John T. Maret; Ernest O. Bachman; Hazel G. Edwards; G. R. Saunders; C. S. Hicks; Donald Hamm; Capitola Goodell; Laura M. Powley; Margaret Rosendahl
