= 1956 United States presidential election in California =

- November 6, 1956
- Turnout: 86.56% (of registered voters) ▼0.29 pp 67.59% (of eligible voters) ▼6.48 pp

Nominee	Dwight D. Eisenhower	Adlai Stevenson II
Party	Republican	Democratic
Home state	Pennsylvania	Illinois
Running mate	Richard Nixon	Estes Kefauver
Electoral vote	32	0
Popular vote	3,027,668	2,420,135
Percentage	55.39%	44.27%
County results
Eisenhower
40–50%
50–60%
60–70%
70–80%
Stevenson
50–60%
President before election
Dwight D. Eisenhower
Republican
Elected President
Dwight D. Eisenhower
Republican

The 1956 United States presidential election in California took place in November 1956 as part of the 1956 United States presidential election. State voters chose 32 representatives, or electors, to the Electoral College, who voted for president and vice president.

The Democratic primary in California was seen as such a decisive win for Adlai Stevenson that it ended the insurgent Kefauver campaign.

California voted for the Republican incumbent, Dwight D. Eisenhower (with incumbent vice president and California native Richard Nixon as his running mate), in a landslide over the Democratic challenger, former Illinois Governor Adlai Stevenson. However, Stevenson did improve his performance in California from four years previous. California's result was about 4.3% more Democratic than the nation-at-large.

As of the 2024 presidential election, this is the last presidential election in California where the Republican candidate won the counties of Alameda and San Francisco, both of which have become strongholds of the Democratic Party.

== Results ==
1956 United States presidential election in California
Partys	Candidate	Votes	Percentage	Electoral votes
Republican	Dwight D. Eisenhower (incumbent)	3,027,668	55.39%	32
Democratic	Adlai Stevenson	2,420,135	44.27%	0
Prohibition	Enoch A. Holtwick	11,119	0.20%	0
No party	T. Coleman Andrews (write-in)	6,087	0.11%	0
No party	Write-ins	819	0.01%	0
No party	Eric Hass (write-in)	300	0.01%	0
No party	Darlington Hoopes (write-in)	123	0.00%	0
No party	Farrell Dobbs (write-in)	96	0.00%	0
No party	Gerald L. K. Smith (write-in)	8	0.00%	0
Invalid or blank votes				—
Totals		5,466,355	100.00%	32
Voter turnout				—

=== Results by county ===
County	Dwight D. Eisenhower Republican		Adlai Stevenson Democratic		Various candidates Other parties		Margin		Total votes cast
County	#	%	#	%	#	%	#	%	Total votes cast
Alameda	192,911	52.40%	174,033	47.27%	1,187	0.33%	18,878	5.13%	368,131
Alpine	114	79.72%	29	20.28%	0	0.00%	85	59.44%	143
Amador	2,126	49.16%	2,181	50.43%	18	0.41%	-55	-1.27%	4,325
Butte	18,382	58.43%	12,933	41.11%	147	0.46%	5,449	17.32%	31,462
Calaveras	2,843	57.91%	2,049	41.74%	17	0.35%	794	16.17%	4,909
Colusa	2,474	53.23%	2,171	46.71%	3	0.06%	303	6.52%	4,648
Contra Costa	74,971	50.98%	71,733	48.78%	347	0.24%	3,238	2.20%	147,051
Del Norte	2,918	53.18%	2,552	46.51%	17	0.31%	366	6.67%	5,487
El Dorado	4,613	53.60%	3,957	45.97%	37	0.43%	656	7.63%	8,607
Fresno	51,611	43.33%	67,234	56.44%	270	0.23%	-15,623	-13.11%	119,115
Glenn	3,463	51.96%	3,192	47.89%	10	0.15%	271	4.07%	6,665
Humboldt	19,019	52.57%	17,025	47.06%	133	0.37%	1,994	5.51%	36,177
Imperial	10,526	56.05%	8,197	43.65%	58	0.30%	2,329	12.40%	18,781
Inyo	3,524	66.19%	1,782	33.47%	18	0.34%	1,742	32.72%	5,324
Kern	46,220	51.31%	43,533	48.33%	322	0.36%	2,687	2.98%	90,075
Kings	6,195	42.28%	8,417	57.45%	40	0.27%	-2,222	-15.17%	14,652
Lake	4,073	64.84%	2,185	34.78%	24	0.38%	1,888	30.06%	6,282
Lassen	2,533	42.48%	3,412	57.22%	18	0.30%	-879	-14.74%	5,963
Los Angeles	1,260,206	55.38%	1,007,887	44.29%	7,331	0.33%	252,319	11.09%	2,275,424
Madera	5,239	42.12%	7,162	57.58%	38	0.30%	-1,923	-15.46%	12,439
Marin	33,792	65.94%	17,301	33.76%	151	0.30%	16,491	32.18%	51,244
Mariposa	1,577	60.31%	1,031	39.43%	7	0.26%	546	20.88%	2,615
Mendocino	10,327	56.94%	7,767	42.82%	43	0.24%	2,560	14.12%	18,137
Merced	11,430	45.99%	13,366	53.78%	56	0.23%	-1,936	-7.79%	24,852
Modoc	1,981	53.21%	1,729	46.44%	13	0.35%	252	6.77%	3,723
Mono	673	73.79%	237	25.99%	2	0.22%	436	47.80%	912
Monterey	29,514	59.54%	19,932	40.21%	127	0.25%	9,582	19.33%	49,573
Napa	13,610	55.93%	10,623	43.66%	100	0.41%	2,987	12.27%	24,333
Nevada	5,475	59.69%	3,667	39.98%	31	0.33%	1,808	19.71%	9,173
Orange	113,510	66.82%	54,895	32.31%	1,474	0.87%	58,615	34.51%	169,879
Placer	9,059	45.89%	10,611	53.76%	69	0.35%	-1,552	-7.87%	19,739
Plumas	2,267	41.87%	3,127	57.75%	21	0.38%	-860	-15.88%	5,415
Riverside	56,766	62.16%	34,098	37.34%	465	0.50%	22,668	24.82%	91,329
Sacramento	67,686	45.10%	82,134	54.73%	260	0.17%	-14,448	-9.63%	150,080
San Benito	3,252	59.53%	2,201	40.29%	10	0.18%	1,051	19.24%	5,463
San Bernardino	86,263	56.88%	64,946	42.83%	443	0.29%	21,317	14.05%	151,652
San Diego	195,742	64.47%	106,716	35.15%	1,147	0.38%	89,026	29.32%	303,605
San Francisco	173,648	51.53%	161,766	48.01%	1,553	0.46%	11,882	3.52%	336,967
San Joaquin	44,491	54.52%	36,941	45.27%	168	0.21%	7,550	9.25%	81,600
San Luis Obispo	16,223	58.47%	11,407	41.11%	118	0.42%	4,816	17.36%	27,748
San Mateo	100,049	61.04%	63,637	38.83%	217	0.13%	36,412	22.21%	163,903
Santa Barbara	31,294	64.55%	16,925	34.91%	265	0.54%	14,369	29.64%	48,484
Santa Clara	105,657	59.09%	72,528	40.56%	633	0.35%	33,129	18.53%	178,818
Santa Cruz	22,109	63.58%	12,574	36.16%	93	0.26%	9,535	27.42%	34,776
Shasta	8,833	43.84%	11,239	55.78%	77	0.38%	-2,406	-11.94%	20,149
Sierra	638	50.55%	620	49.13%	4	0.32%	18	1.42%	1,262
Siskiyou	6,841	49.79%	6,837	49.76%	63	0.45%	4	0.03%	13,741
Solano	17,865	41.68%	24,903	58.10%	95	0.22%	-7,038	-16.42%	42,863
Sonoma	33,659	61.92%	20,616	37.92%	86	0.16%	13,043	24.00%	54,361
Stanislaus	26,695	48.60%	28,040	51.05%	192	0.35%	-1,345	-2.45%	54,927
Sutter	6,327	62.79%	3,673	36.45%	77	0.76%	2,654	26.34%	10,077
Tehama	4,866	53.82%	4,143	45.82%	33	0.36%	723	8.00%	9,042
Trinity	1,447	50.42%	1,406	48.99%	17	0.59%	41	1.43%	2,870
Tulare	26,051	52.50%	23,407	47.17%	160	0.33%	2,644	5.33%	49,618
Tuolumne	3,619	52.12%	3,310	47.67%	14	0.21%	309	4.45%	6,943
Ventura	26,342	49.92%	26,276	49.80%	149	0.28%	66	0.12%	52,767
Yolo	9,347	47.99%	10,075	51.72%	57	0.29%	-728	-3.73%	19,479
Yuba	4,782	55.76%	3,767	43.92%	27	0.32%	1,015	11.84%	8,576
Total	3,027,668	55.39%	2,420,135	44.27%	18,552	0.34%	607,533	11.12%	5,466,355

==== Counties that flipped from Republican to Democratic ====
- Amador
- Madera
- Merced
- Placer
- Shasta
- Stanislaus
- Yolo

==== Counties that flipped from Democratic to Republican ====
- Contra Costa
