= 1888 United States presidential election in California =

- November 6, 1888
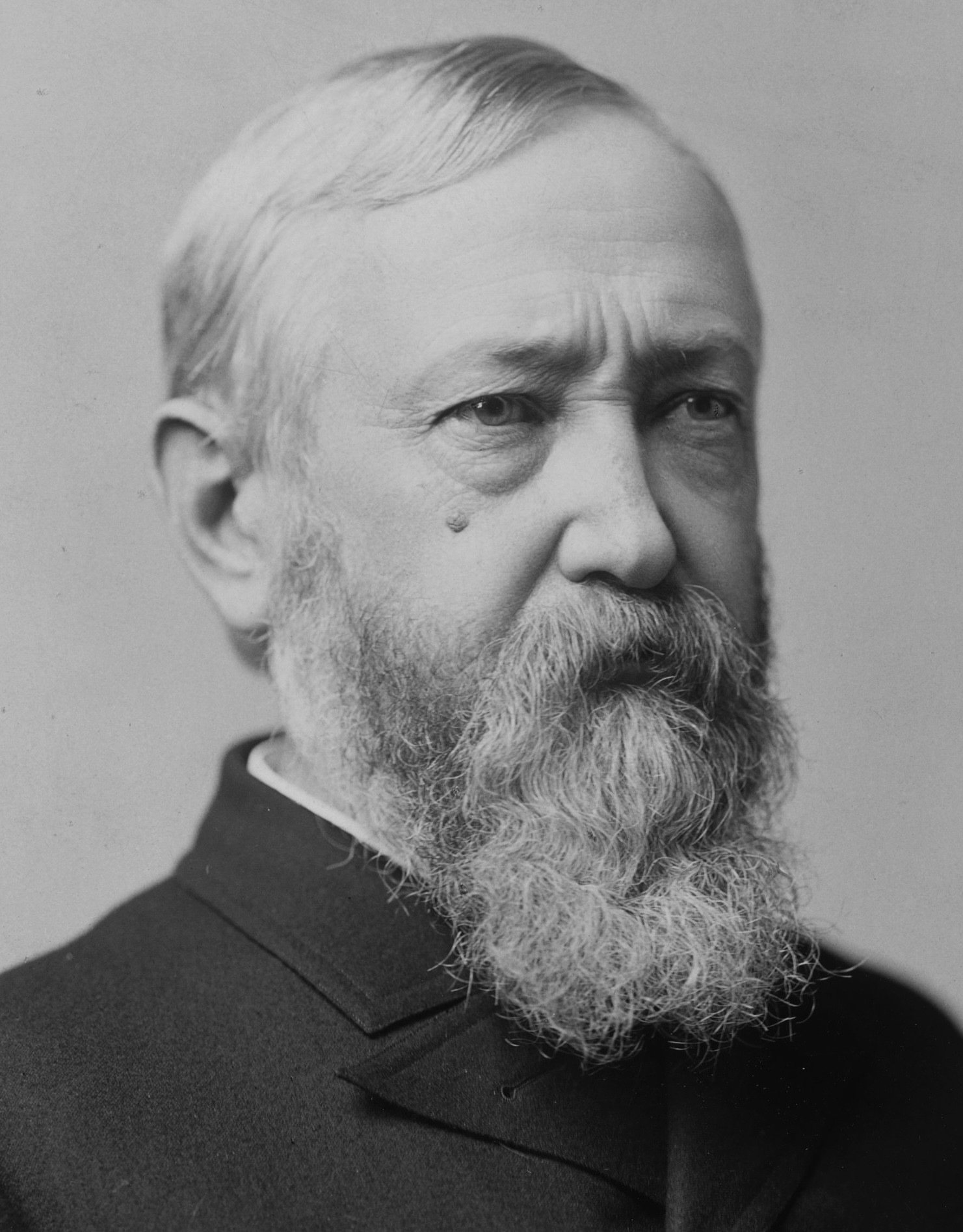

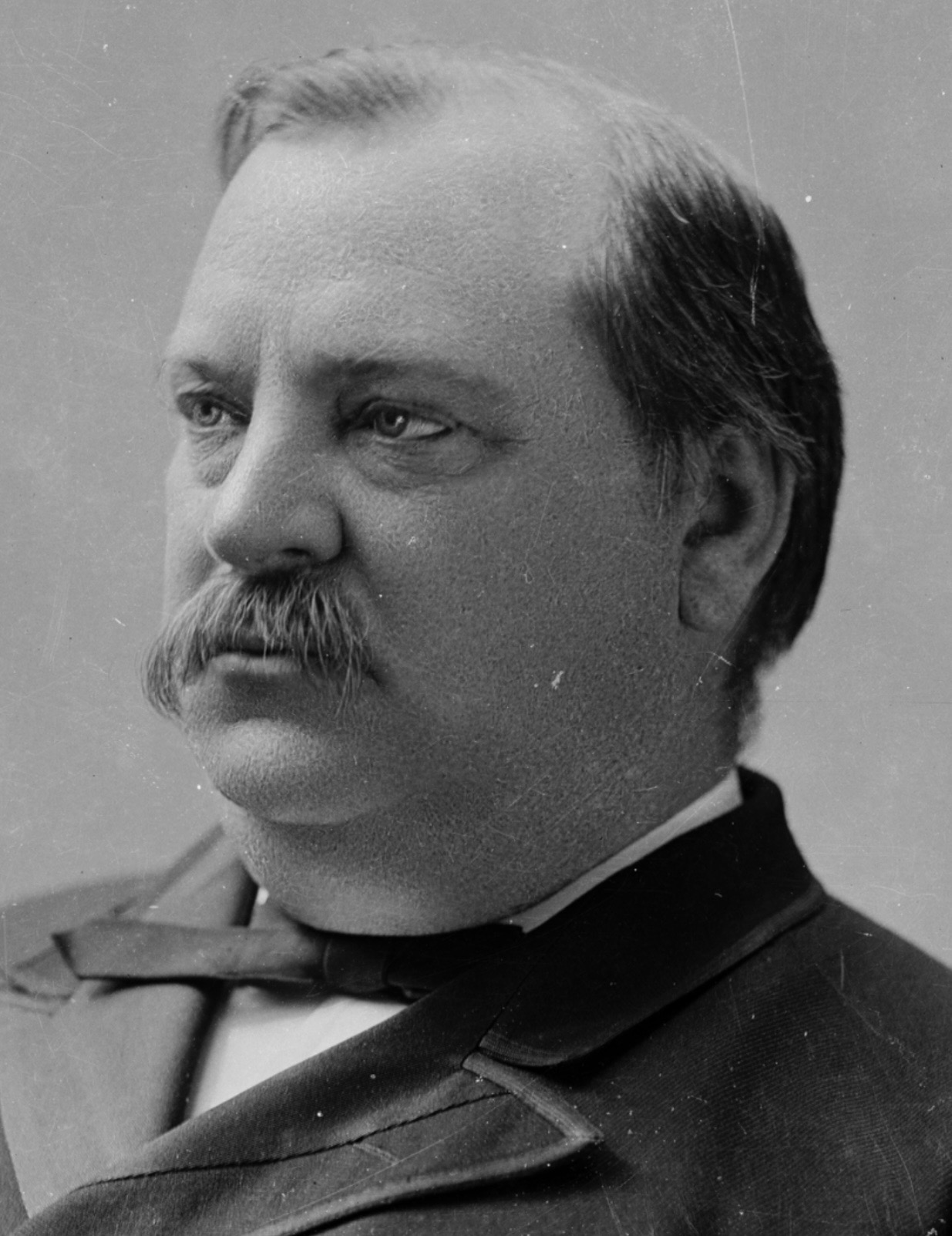
Nominee	Benjamin Harrison	Grover Cleveland
Party	Republican	Democratic
Home state	Indiana	New York
Running mate	Levi P. Morton	Allen G. Thurman
Electoral vote	8	0
Popular vote	124,816	117,729
Percentage	49.66%	46.84%
County results
Harrison
40–50%
50–60%
60–70%
Cleveland
40–50%
50–60%
60–70%
Tie
49.70% Harrison & Cleveland
President before election
Grover Cleveland
Democratic
Elected President
Benjamin Harrison
Republican

The 1888 United States presidential election in California was held on November 6, 1888, as part of the 1888 United States presidential election. State voters chose eight representatives, or electors, to the Electoral College, who voted for president and vice president. As was standard practice at the time, voters chose the electors directly on a general ticket.

California narrowly voted for the Republican challenger, former Indiana Senator Benjamin Harrison, over the Democratic incumbent, Grover Cleveland.

== Results ==
General Election Results
Party	Pledged to	Elector	Votes
Republican Party	Benjamin Harrison	George A. Knight	124,816
Republican Party	Benjamin Harrison	Henry M. Streeter	124,809
Republican Party	Benjamin Harrison	Lansing B. Mizner	124,802
Republican Party	Benjamin Harrison	Thomas L. Carothers	124,789
Republican Party	Benjamin Harrison	Samuel M. Shortridge	124,781
Republican Party	Benjamin Harrison	W. H. L. Barnes	124,754
Republican Party	Benjamin Harrison	John F. Swift	124,754
Republican Party	Benjamin Harrison	George W. Schell	124,751
Democratic Party	Grover Cleveland	A. Caminetti	117,729
Democratic Party	Grover Cleveland	C. P. Berry	117,698
Democratic Party	Grover Cleveland	Frederick Berringer	117,697
Democratic Party	Grover Cleveland	B. D. Murphy	117,676
Democratic Party	Grover Cleveland	Byron Water	117,675
Democratic Party	Grover Cleveland	N. Bowden	117,640
Democratic Party	Grover Cleveland	P. J. Murphy	117,634
Democratic Party	Grover Cleveland	Charles A. Jenkins	117,626
Prohibition Party	Clinton B. Fisk	John Bidwell	5,761
Prohibition Party	Clinton B. Fisk	R. H. McDonald	5,760
Prohibition Party	Clinton B. Fisk	J. F. Wilson	5,748
Prohibition Party	Clinton B. Fisk	C. W. Pedlar	5,746
Prohibition Party	Clinton B. Fisk	W. H. Briggs	5,745
Prohibition Party	Clinton B. Fisk	H. H. Luse	5,744
Prohibition Party	Clinton B. Fisk	A. J. Gregg	5,737
Prohibition Party	Clinton B. Fisk	A. D. Boren	5,736
American Party	James Curtis	F. M. Pixley	1,591
American Party	James Curtis	Louis A. Garrett	1,555
American Party	James Curtis	Alexander Duncan	1,535
American Party	James Curtis	Daniel Inmann	1,545
American Party	James Curtis	D. Lambert	1,544
American Party	James Curtis	N. M. Orr	1,539
American Party	James Curtis	J. D. Lyons	1,340
Write-in		Alfred Dagget	801 (Note: Appears to have replaced C. N. Wilson on some American ballots)
American Party	James Curtis	C. N. Wilson	696
Write-in		P. D. Wigginton	161 (Note: Appears to have replaced J. D. Lyons on some American ballots)
Write-in		Scattering	480
Votes cast (Note: Based on totals for highest elector on each ticket)			251,339

=== Results by county ===
County	Benjamin Harrison Republican		Stephen Grover Cleveland Democratic		Clinton Bowen Fisk Prohibition		James Curtis American		Scattering Write-in		Margin		Total votes cast (Note: Based on the highest elector on each ticket)
County	#	%	#	%	#	%	#	%	#	%	#	%	Total votes cast
Alameda	8,840	57.18%	5,693	36.82%	359	2.32%	300	1.94%	269	1.74%	3,147	20.35%	15,461
Alpine	53	66.25%	27	33.75%	0	0.00%	0	0.00%	0	0.00%	26	32.50%	80
Amador	1,373	47.48%	1,429	49.41%	79	2.73%	11	0.38%	0	0.00%	-56	-1.94%	2,892
Butte	2,191	48.25%	2,215	48.78%	127	2.80%	4	0.09%	4	0.09%	-24	-0.53%	4,541
Calaveras	1,441	52.17%	1,305	47.25%	12	0.43%	2	0.07%	2	0.07%	136	4.92%	2,762
Colusa	1,116	35.14%	2,010	63.29%	41	1.29%	9	0.28%	0	0.00%	-894	-28.15%	3,176
Contra Costa	1,518	55.04%	1,177	42.68%	53	1.92%	10	0.36%	0	0.00%	341	12.36%	2,758
Del Norte	244	42.29%	294	50.95%	14	2.43%	24	4.16%	1	0.17%	-50	-8.67%	577
El Dorado	1,350	47.02%	1,456	50.71%	61	2.12%	1	0.03%	3	0.10%	-106	-3.69%	2,871
Fresno	2,461	44.81%	2,822	51.38%	173	3.15%	18	0.33%	18	0.33%	-361	-6.57%	5,492
Humboldt	2,772	55.93%	2,014	40.64%	75	1.51%	53	1.07%	42	0.85%	758	15.29%	4,956
Inyo	437	58.66%	273	36.64%	13	1.74%	21	2.82%	1	0.13%	164	22.01%	745
Kern	910	41.46%	1,229	55.99%	24	1.09%	32	1.46%	0	0.00%	-319	-14.53%	2,195
Lake	731	44.87%	867	53.22%	27	1.66%	3	0.18%	1	0.06%	-136	-8.35%	1,629
Lassen	488	46.79%	535	51.29%	16	1.53%	2	0.19%	2	0.19%	-47	-4.51%	1,043
Los Angeles	13,805	54.64%	10,110	40.02%	1,266	5.01%	83	0.33%	0	0.00%	3,695	14.63%	25,264
Marin	936	52.76%	802	45.21%	16	0.90%	17	0.96%	3	0.17%	134	7.55%	1,774
Mariposa	526	43.54%	664	54.97%	1	0.08%	3	0.25%	14	1.16%	-138	-11.42%	1,208
Mendocino	1,711	44.78%	2,006	52.50%	90	2.36%	14	0.37%	0	0.00%	-295	-7.72%	3,821
Merced	773	43.04%	972	54.12%	19	1.06%	32	1.78%	0	0.00%	-199	-11.08%	1,796
Modoc	552	43.19%	679	53.13%	46	3.60%	1	0.08%	0	0.00%	-127	-9.94%	1,278
Mono	347	59.72%	215	37.01%	9	1.55%	10	1.72%	0	0.00%	132	22.72%	581
Monterey	1,875	48.55%	1,866	48.32%	113	2.93%	8	0.21%	0	0.00%	9	0.23%	3,862
Napa	1,763	53.20%	1,496	45.14%	42	1.27%	13	0.39%	0	0.00%	267	8.06%	3,314
Nevada	2,167	51.69%	1,923	45.87%	95	2.27%	7	0.17%	0	0.00%	244	5.82%	4,192
Placer	1,761	52.35%	1,547	45.99%	50	1.49%	6	0.18%	0	0.00%	214	6.36%	3,364
Plumas	648	52.55%	570	46.23%	9	0.73%	3	0.24%	3	0.24%	78	6.33%	1,233
Sacramento	4,769	56.37%	3,447	40.74%	108	1.28%	76	0.90%	60	0.71%	1,322	15.63%	8,460
San Benito	664	42.76%	797	51.32%	90	5.80%	2	0.13%	0	0.00%	-133	-8.56%	1,553
San Bernardino	3,059	53.50%	2,388	41.76%	263	4.60%	8	0.14%	0	0.00%	671	11.73%	5,718
San Diego	4,661	56.88%	3,189	38.92%	322	3.93%	11	0.13%	11	0.13%	1,472	17.96%	8,194
San Francisco	25,708	46.14%	28,699	51.51%	0	0.00%	437	0.78%	873	1.57%	-2,991	-5.37%	55,717
San Joaquin	2,829	47.30%	2,822	47.18%	286	4.78%	44	0.74%	0	0.00%	7	0.12%	5,981
San Luis Obispo	1,689	49.68%	1,585	46.62%	121	3.56%	5	0.15%	0	0.00%	104	3.06%	3,400
San Mateo	1,121	52.95%	980	46.29%	14	0.66%	1	0.05%	1	0.05%	141	6.66%	2,117
Santa Barbara	1,684	49.20%	1,565	45.72%	161	4.70%	8	0.23%	5	0.15%	119	3.48%	3,423
Santa Clara	4,457	49.94%	3,972	44.51%	402	4.50%	93	1.04%	0	0.00%	485	5.43%	8,924
Santa Cruz	1,996	50.66%	1,750	44.42%	193	4.90%	1	0.03%	0	0.00%	246	6.24%	3,940
Shasta	1,490	50.70%	1,394	47.43%	51	1.74%	2	0.07%	2	0.07%	96	3.27%	2,939
Sierra	1,004	59.23%	689	40.65%	0	0.00%	2	0.12%	0	0.00%	315	18.58%	1,695
Siskiyou	1,361	47.84%	1,459	51.28%	20	0.70%	5	0.18%	0	0.00%	-98	-3.44%	2,845
Solano	2,231	49.67%	2,158	48.04%	94	2.09%	9	0.20%	0	0.00%	73	1.63%	4,492
Sonoma	3,293	46.97%	3,394	48.41%	154	2.20%	93	1.33%	77	1.10%	-101	-1.44%	7,011
Stanislaus	903	39.02%	1,315	56.83%	91	3.93%	5	0.22%	0	0.00%	-412	-17.80%	2,314
Sutter	722	48.95%	698	47.32%	53	3.59%	1	0.07%	1	0.07%	24	1.63%	1,475
Tehama	1,181	47.09%	1,290	51.44%	34	1.36%	2	0.08%	1	0.04%	-109	-4.35%	2,508
Trinity	489 (Note: The electors on the Republican ticket received 490 votes each except for the highest statewide elector, Knight, who only received 489 votes)	49.64%	490	49.75%	2	0.20%	4	0.41%	0	0.00%	-1 (Note: Using the highest statewide elector on each ticket results in Cleveland carrying Trinity County)	-0.10%	985
Tulare	2,275	43.82%	2,637	50.79%	244	4.70%	36	0.69%	0	0.00%	-362	-6.97%	5,192
Tuolumne	854	41.16%	1,159	55.86%	55	2.65%	7	0.34%	0	0.00%	-305	-14.70%	2,075
Ventura	1,107	53.84%	906	44.07%	41	1.99%	2	0.10%	0	0.00%	201	9.78%	2,056
Yolo	1,350	44.66%	1,580	52.27%	91	3.01%	2	0.07%	0	0.00%	-230	-7.61%	3,023
Yuba	1,130	46.37%	1,170	48.01%	41	1.68%	48	1.97%	48	1.97%	-40	-1.64%	2,437
Total	124,816	49.66%	117,729	46.84%	5,761	2.29%	1,591	0.63%	1,442	0.57%	7,087	2.82%	251,339

==== Counties that flipped from Republican to Democratic ====
- Butte
- Del Norte
- San Francisco
- Sonoma
- Trinity
- Tuolumne
- Yuba

== See also ==
- United States presidential elections in California
