= Abortion in California =

Abortion in California is legal up to the point of fetal viability. In 2022, 67% of California voters approved Proposition 1, which amended the Constitution of California to explicitly protect the right to abortion and contraception.

In response to a report by NARAL that found crisis pregnancy centers (CPCs) providing misleading and inaccurate information to pregnant women, the California Legislature passed the Reproductive FACT (Freedom, Accountability, Comprehensive Care, and Transparency) Act (AB-755), which required CPCs to post visible notices that other options for pregnancy, including abortion, are available from state-sponsored clinics. It also mandated that unlicensed centers post notice of their unlicensed status. The centers, typically run by Christian non-profit groups, challenged the act on the basis that it violated their right free speech. The law was subsequently struck down as unconstitutional in a 5–4 decision along ideological lines by the U.S. Supreme Court. California allows certain qualified non-physician health professionals, such as physician assistants, nurse practitioners, and certified nurse midwives, to do first-trimester aspiration abortions, and to prescribe drugs for medical abortions. There have been a number of abortion-related cases before the California Supreme Court, the California Courts of Appeal, and the U.S. District Court for the Southern District of California since 1969.

There have been several deaths in California as a result of illegal abortions, including 35 in 1966 and 1967. California uses its own funds to cover all "medically necessary" abortions sought by low-income women under Medicaid. 88,466 were state-funded in 2010.

California has an active abortion rights activist community. Society for Human Abortion was founded in 1963 in San Francisco. People in California participated in #StopTheBans protested in May 2019, including at protests in San Francisco and Los Angeles. There is also an active anti-abortion rights community. Singer Pat Boone announced he recorded a song titled "Sixteen Thousand Faces" about the Los Angeles fetus disposal scandal in May 1985. The first Walk for Life was held on January 22, 2005. A number of acts of anti-abortion rights violence have also taken place in the state, including an attempted bombing in July 1987, fires at clinics in the late 1980s and early 1990s, and acts of violence in San Francisco in February 1995, Modesto in March 2003, and Costa Mesa in March 2022.

== History ==
On May 31, 2019, Democratic Governor Gavin Newsom issued a proclamation explaining California's abortion laws, and encouraged women from states seeking to restrict a woman's ability to get an abortion to come to California for an abortion if she needs one. The statement read in part, "California will continue to uphold women's equality and liberty by protecting their reproductive freedom, educating Californians about their rights to reproductive freedom, welcoming women to California to fully exercise their reproductive rights, and acting as a model for other states that want to ensure full reproductive freedom for women."

=== Legislative history ===
In the 19th century, bans by state legislatures on abortion were about protecting the life of the mother, given the number of deaths caused by abortions; state governments saw themselves as looking out for the lives of their citizens. By 1950, the state legislature would pass a law stating that a woman who had an abortion, or actively sought to have an abortion, regardless of whether she went through with it, were guilty of a criminal offense.

An abortion ban was in place by 1900, and by 1950, it was a criminal offense for a woman to have an abortion. In 1962, the American Law Institute published their model penal code, as it applied to abortions, with three circumstances where they believed a physician could justifiably perform an abortion, and California adopted a version of this code. In 2002, the California State Legislature passed a law guaranteeing women the right to have an abortion "prior to viability of the fetus, or when the abortion is necessary to protect the life or health of the woman".

In 1962, the American Law Institute published their model penal code, as it applied to abortions, with three circumstances where they believed a physician could justifiably perform an abortion: "If ... there is substantial risk that the continuance of the pregnancy would gravely impair the physical or mental health of the mother, or that the child would be born with grave physical or mental defect, or that the pregnancy resulted from rape, incest, or other felonious intercourse." In 1967, the California State Legislature adopted a form of this into law, but did not allow an exception for birth defects. Alaska, Hawaii, California, and New York were the only four states that made abortion legal between 1967 and 1970 that did not require a reason to request an abortion. California amended its abortion law in 1967 to address the disconnect between legal and medical justifications for therapeutic exceptions. This change made them one of the most progressive states in the country when it came to abortion rights. The bill was signed into law by Governor Ronald Reagan, after the legislature removed as a reason for legal abortion that a fetus had severe physical deformities. State law in 1971 required that any woman getting a legal abortion in the state needed to be a resident for some specific period between 30 and 90 days.

==== California Reproductive Privacy Act ====
In 2002, the California State Legislature passed a law, the California Reproductive Privacy Act (SB 1301, Kuehl), that said: "The state may not deny or interfere with a woman's right to choose or obtain an abortion prior to viability of the fetus, or when the abortion is necessary to protect the life or health of the woman," and repealed several abortion criminalization laws. The state was one of ten states in 2007 to have a customary informed consent provision for abortions.

Based on a report prepared by NARAL Pro-Choice America, which alleged that Crisis Pregnancy Centers (CPCs) were providing misleading and inaccurate information, the California Legislature passed the Reproductive FACT (Freedom, Accountability, Comprehensive Care, and Transparency) Act (AB-755) in October 2015. It required any licensed health-care facility that provided care services related to pregnancies to post a notice that stated: "California has public programs that provide immediate free or low-cost access to comprehensive family planning services (including all FDA-approved methods of contraception), prenatal care, and abortion for eligible women." The law set provisions where this notice was to be posted, and established civil fines if facilities did not comply. The act required unlicensed facilities which offered certain pregnancy-related services to post a notice stating: "This facility is not licensed as a medical facility by the State of California, and has no licensed medical provider who provides or directly supervises the provision of all of the services, whose primary purpose is providing pregnancy-related services." The Supreme Court of the United States found that the law violated the First Amendment in 2018, in National Institute of Family and Life Advocates v. Becerra.

As of 2017, California, Oregon, Montana, Vermont, and New Hampshire allow certain qualified non-physician health professionals, such as physicians' assistants, nurse practitioners, and certified nurse midwives, to do first-trimester aspiration abortions, and to prescribe drugs for medical abortions. In August 2018, the state had a law to protect the right to have an abortion. As of May 14, 2019, the state prohibits abortions after the fetus is viable, generally some point between week 24 and 26. This period uses a standard defined by the US Supreme Court in 1992, with the Planned Parenthood v. Casey ruling.

On May 20, 2019, the California State Senate passed Senate Bill 24, the College Student Right to Access Act. The Act requires public state universities to offer mifepristone, the abortion pill, to female students at zero cost by January 1, 2023; funding for the program will be paid for through insurance and private grants, with $200,000 to each University of California and California State University health clinic for training and equipment. The bill was approved by both the California State Assembly and California State Senate, as amended on September 13, 2019, was enacted by Governor Gavin Newsom on October 11, 2019, and went into effect on January 1, 2020. University clinics also have to set aside an additional $200,000 each to set up a student hotline to provide information to women seeking advice and assistance. The bill was sponsored by Sen. Connie Leyva.

In May 2022, State Senate President pro tempore Toni Atkins said she would introduce a state constitutional amendment to enshrine the right to an abortion after a draft opinion showed the US Supreme Court's intent to overturn Roe v. Wade. Both Newsom and Assembly Speaker Anthony Rendon expressed their support for the amendment. The Supreme Court did overturn Roe v. Wade in Dobbs v. Jackson Women's Health Organization, No. 19-1392, 597 U.S. ___ (2022) later in 2022.

On September 27, 2022, California Assembly Bill 1242 was passed. This assembly bill aimed to further strengthen abortion protections, and protect women from other state who have abortions in California by amending the penal code. These amendments would also prevent law enforcement from giving information regarding a legal abortion that takes place within the state of California. AB 1242 also sets bail at $0 for those that are arrested in connection to a lawful abortion that takes place within California.

On November 8, 2022, California voters overwhelmingly passed Proposition 1, which amended the Constitution of California to explicitly protect the right to abortion; it is among the first three states do so, alongside Michigan and Vermont.

==== Amendment text ====
The state shall not deny or interfere with an individual's reproductive freedom in their most intimate decisions, which includes their fundamental right to choose to have an abortion and their fundamental right to choose or refuse contraceptives. This section is intended to further the constitutional right to privacy guaranteed by Section 1, and the constitutional right to not be denied equal protection guaranteed by Section 7. Nothing herein narrows or limits the right to privacy or equal protection.

— Article 1, Section 1.1 of the California Constitution.

==== Post-Proposition 1 ====
On September 27, 2023, Newsom signed several shield bills into law, including AB 352, AB 254 and AB 345. AB 352 amends the California Confidentiality of Medical Information Act (CMIA) to require electronic health record developers to enable privacy protections for, and segregate gender affirming care, abortion, abortion-related services and contraception from the rest of, a patient’s medical record. AB 254 amends the CMIA to prohibit certain health care providers, pharmaceutical companies, California health care service plans and other entities from disclosing “medical information” in their possession regarding a patient, enrollee or subscriber without the individual’s prior authorization unless an exception applies, and as well as create, maintain, store or destroy medical information in a manner that preserves its confidentiality. AB 345 prohibits employees, contractors, and agents from cooperating, providing information, or expending resources in furtherance of an investigation of an individual for “legally protected health care activity”, including abortion, and prohibits any California Healing Arts Board from taking disciplinary action or denying an application based on the provision of the protected care under SB 345.

On September 26, 2025, Newsom signed AB 260, which allows health care providers the option to prescribe abortion care medication to patients anonymously, as well as AB 1525, which shields attorneys assisting other states with access to reproductive care from State Bar discipline. He also signed AB 45, which prohibits the collection, use, disclosure, sale, sharing, or retention of personal information of a natural person located at or with the precise geolocation of a family planning center. Finally, he signed AB 50, which repealed Medi-Cal policies requiring a prescription for reimbursement of enrollees for over-the-counter contraceptives.

=== Judicial history ===
In 1969, the California Supreme Court ruled in favor of abortion rights, after hearing an appeal launched by Dr. Leon Belous, who had been convicted of referring a woman to someone who could provide her with an illegal abortion; California's abortion law was declared unconstitutional in People v. Belous because it was vague and denied people due process. The US Supreme Court's decision in 1973's Roe v. Wade ruling meant the state could no longer regulate abortion in the first trimester. (However, the Supreme Court overturned Roe v. Wade in Dobbs v. Jackson Women's Health Organization, No. 19-1392, 597 U.S. ___ (2022) later in 2022.)

In July 1984, the California Courts of Appeal overturned Superior Court of Los Angeles County judge Eli Chernow, ruling that fetuses could not be buried as human remains in the Los Angeles fetus disposal scandal, which was a win for pro-choice groups and feminists. The case had been appealed by Carol Downer of the Los Angeles Feminist Women's Health Center and the American Civil Liberties Union, and was denounced by the California Pro-Life Medical Association and the Catholic League. The appealing parties argued that allowing pro-life groups to bury the remains violated the separation of church and state. The Court's opinion stated: "It is clear from the record that the Catholic League is a religious organization which regards a fetus as a human being and abortion as murder. While this specific belief may well cross sectarian lines... any state action showing a preference for this belief will be strictly scrutinized and must be invalidated." Since fetal remains are normally incinerated without ceremony, there was no reason to do otherwise with these fetuses, stating "We perceive that the intended burial ceremony will enlist the prestige and power of the state. This is constitutionally forbidden." However, religious services could hold concurrent onsite memorial services, which was praised by US president Ronald Reagan in a letter to the California Pro-Life Medical Association, admiring their decision "to hold a memorial service for these children". Philibosian announced he would appeal the ruling allowing onsite memorial services. In October 1984, U.S. Supreme Court justice William Rehnquist refused to overturn the state appeals court ruling allowing the religious ceremonies. This was officially upheld by the Supreme Court in March 1985.

CPCs and the Pacific Justice Institute filed lawsuits challenging the constitutionality of the Reproductive FACT Act. The CPCs asserted that the law's requirements constituted compelled speech in violation of their rights to freedom of speech and free exercise of religion under the First Amendment. Among these was a lawsuit filed in the U.S. District Court for the Southern District of California by the National Institute of Family and Life Advocates (NIFLA) who represented over 100 CPCs in California. NIFLA sought a preliminary injunction to prevent the Reproductive FACT Act from coming into force on January 1, 2016, while the lawsuit continued. The Court denied the motion for a preliminary injunction in February 2016. NIFLA appealed from the denial of the preliminary injunction to the U.S. Court of Appeals for the Ninth Circuit in June 2016, which affirmed the judgment of the District Court in a unanimous decision authored by Judge Dorothy W. Nelson, joined by Judges A. Wallace Tashima and John B. Owens. After granting certioari as to the free speech question, in a controversial 5-4 opinion along ideological lines, the US Supreme Court reversed, holding that the FACT Act violated the Free Speech Clause of the First Amendment.

In September 2024, the state of California sued a Catholic hospital in Eureka for refusing to provide emergency abortions.

=== Clinic history ===
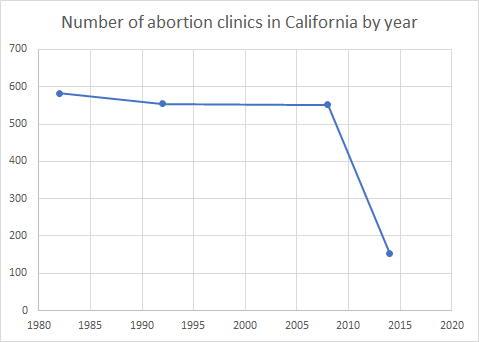
Number of abortion clinics in California by year

Between 1982 and 1992, the number of abortion clinics in the state decreased by 29, going from 583 in 1982 to 554 in 1992. In the period between 1992 and 1996, the state ranked first in the loss of number of abortion clinics, losing 62 to have a total of 492 in 1996. In 2008, the states with the most providers were California, with 522, and New York, with 249. In 2014, there were 152 abortion clinics in the state. In 2014, 43% of the counties in the state did not have an abortion clinic. That year, 5% of women in the state aged 15–44 lived in a county without an abortion clinic. In March 2016, there were 114 Planned Parenthood clinics in the state. In 2017, there were 110 Planned Parenthood clinics, of which 93 offered abortion services, in a state with a population of 9,384,526 women aged 15–49.

== Propositions ==
Between 1999 and 2015, there were 34 attempts to place on the ballot an initiative to impose a waiting period on abortions or require parental notification in California, of which only 3 succeeded in qualifying for a statewide vote. In 2022, the California State Legislature voted to place an initiative that codifies abortion and contraceptive rights throughout the state after the US Supreme Court overturned Roe v. Wade.

Table of California propositions relating to abortion
| Proposal | Enactment date | Subject | Election date | Electorate | Total poll | (%) (Note: Total poll as a percentage of the electorate) | Yes | (%) (Note: As a percentage of the valid poll (total poll without votes not cast)) | No | (%) | Not cast | (%) (Note: Votes not cast as a percentage of the total poll.) | Ref. |
|---|---|---|---|---|---|---|---|---|---|---|---|---|---|
| Proposition 73 | N/A | Parental notification and waiting period | November 8, 2005 | 22,487,768 | 7,968,757 | 35.4 | 3,676,592 | 47.2 | 4,109,430 | 52.8 | 182,735 | 2.3 | |
| | Waiting Period and Parental Notification Before Termination of Minor's Pregnancy. Initiative Constitutional Amendment. | | | | | | | | | | | | |
| Proposition 85 | N/A | Parental notification and waiting period | November 7, 2006 | 22,652,190 | 8,899,059 | 39.3 | 3,868,714 | 45.8 | 4,576,128 | 54.5 | 454,217 | 5.1 | |
| | Waiting Period and Parental Notification Before Termination of Minor's Pregnancy. Initiative Constitutional Amendment. | | | | | | | | | | | | |
| Proposition 4 | N/A | Parental notification and waiting period | November 4, 2008 | 23,208,710 | 13,743,177 | 59.2 | 6,220,473 | 48.0 | 6,728,478 | 52.0 | 794,226 | 5.8 | |
| | Waiting Period and Parental Notification Before Termination of Minor's Pregnancy. Initiative Constitutional Amendment. | | | | | | | | | | | | |
| Proposition 1 | December 21, 2022 | Right to abortion and contraception | November 8, 2022 | 26,876,800 | 11,146,610 | 50.8 | 7,176,883 | 66.9 | 3,553,561 | 33.1 | 416,166 | 3.7 | |
| | Constitutional Right to Reproductive Freedom. Legislative Constitutional Amendment. | | | | | | | | | | | | |

Results of California propositions by county

2005 Proposition 73

2006 Proposition 85

2008 Proposition 4

2022 Proposition 1

Legend
Yes: 50–60% 60–70% 70–80% 80–90%
No: 50–60% 60–70% 70–80% 80–90%

== Statistics ==
There were 5,030 therapeutic abortions in 1968 and 15,339 in 1969, and more than 60,000 in 1970. In 1990, 3,949,000 women in the state faced the risk of an unintended pregnancy. Alaska, California, and New Hampshire did not voluntarily provide the Center for Disease Control with abortion related data in 2000, nor did they provide any data the following year. In 2014, 57% of adults said in a poll by the Pew Research Center that abortion should be legal and 38% said it should be illegal in all or most cases. In 2017, the state had an infant mortality rate of 4.2 deaths per 1,000 live births.

In the year following the overturn of Roe v. Wade, California saw an 11.2% increase in abortions, primarily driven by patients traveling from states with abortion bans.

Number, rate, and ratio of reported abortions, by reporting area of residence and occurrence and by percentage of abortions obtained by out-of-state residents
| Location | Residence | | | Occurrence | | | % obtained by out-of-state residents | Year | Ref |
|---|---|---|---|---|---|---|---|---|---|
| Location | No. | Rate^ | Ratio^^ | No. | Rate^ | Ratio^^ | % obtained by out-of-state residents | Year | Ref |
| California | | | | 518 | | 9.2 | | 1967 | |
| California | | | | 5,031 | | 14.8 | | 1968 | |
| California | | | | 15,339 | | 43.5 | | 1969 | |
| California | | | | 304,230 | 42.1 | | | 1992 | |
| California | | | | 240,240 | 33.4 | | | 1995 | |
| California | | | | 237,830 | 33 | | | 1996 | |
^number of abortions per 1,000 women aged 15–44; ^^number of abortions per 1,000 live births

Number and Percent of Therapeutic Abortions and Ratio per 1,000 Live Births by regions in California from November 1967 to 1969
| Age | Percent distribution | | | Ratio Per 1,000 Live Births | | |
|---|---|---|---|---|---|---|
| Age | 1967 | 1968 | 1969 | 1967 | 1968 | 1969 |
| Total | 100 (518) | 100 (5,031) | 100 (15,339) | 9.2 | 14.8 | 43.5 |
| 10-14 | 5.8 | 3.6 | 2.2 | º | º | º |
| 15-19 | 23.2 | 25.5 | 29.9 | 12.3 | 22.2 | 78.2 |
| 20-24 | 23.4 | 27.1 | 31.8 | 5.7 | 10.6 | 36.6 |
| 25-29 | 16.4 | 17.2 | 15.7 | 6.1 | 9.8 | 25.2 |
| 30-34 | 14.7 | 11.6 | 10.1 | 10.9 | 14.4 | 37 |
| 35-39 | 10.2 | 10 | 7 | 16 | 27.7 | 60.7 |
| 40-44 | 5.8 | 4.3 | 2.7 | 31.4 | 42.6 | 88.8 |
| 45-49 | 0.6 | 0.5 | 0.3 | º | º | º |
| Not Reported | - | 0.2 | 0.1 | º | º | º |

Number of reported abortions, abortion rate and percentage change in rate by geographic region and state in 1992, 1995 and 1996
| Census division and state | Number | | | Rate | | | % change 1992–1996 |
|---|---|---|---|---|---|---|---|
| Census division and state | 1992 | 1995 | 1996 | 1992 | 1995 | 1996 | % change 1992–1996 |
| US Total | 1,528,930 | 1,363,690 | 1,365,730 | 25.9 | 22.9 | 22.9 | –12 |
| Pacific | 368,040 | 290,520 | 288,190 | 38.7 | 30.5 | 30.1 | –22 |
| Alaska | 2,370 | 1,990 | 2,040 | 16.5 | 14.2 | 14.6 | –11 |
| California | 304,230 | 240,240 | 237,830 | 42.1 | 33.4 | 33 | –22 |
| Hawaii | 12,190 | 7,510 | 6,930 | 46 | 29.3 | 27.3 | –41 |
| Oregon | 16,060 | 15,590 | 15,050 | 23.9 | 22.6 | 21.6 | –10 |
| Washington | 33,190 | 25,190 | 26,340 | 27.7 | 20.2 | 20.9 | –24 |

Age-Specific Percent Distribution and Ratios of Therapeutic Abortions to Live Births
| Statistical Area | # of abortions (1967–1969) | % of abortions (1967–1969) | Ratio Per 1,000 Live Birth | | | |
|---|---|---|---|---|---|---|
| Statistical Area | # of abortions (1967–1969) | % of abortions (1967–1969) | 1967–1969 | 1967 | 1968 | 1969 |
| California | 20888 | 100 | 22.8 | 9.2 | 14.8 | 43.5 |
| North Coast | 15 | 0.1 | 2.4 | 2.2 | 2.2 | 2.7 |
| Sacramento Valley | 1373 | 6.6 | 31 | 7.9 | 17.8 | 66.5 |
| Mountain | 85 | 0.4 | 6.5 | 3.4 | 3.6 | 12.3 |
| San Francisco Bay | 12568 | 60.2 | 62.1 | 26.5 | 42.7 | 115.4 |
| Central Coast | 337 | 1.6 | 15.6 | 4.7 | 7.8 | 33.8 |
| San Joaquin Valley | 429 | 2.1 | 5.3 | 1.8 | 3.3 | 10.9 |
| Santa Barbara-Ventura | 677 | 3.2 | 24 | 8.4 | 15.7 | 46.1 |
| Los Angeles Metropolitan | 4060 | 19.4 | 10.2 | 4.5 | 6.5 | 19.1 |
| San Diego Metropolitan | 960 | 4.6 | 14.8 | 3 | 5.7 | 33.8 |
| Southeast | 384 | 1.8 | 6.7 | 1.8 | 4.5 | 13.3 |

== Illegal abortion deaths and injuries ==
In 1966 and 1967, there were 35 illegal abortion deaths. This decreased by 35% in the period between 1968 and 1969, when there were 22 deaths. In 1968, 701 women were admitted to one Los Angeles hospital alone for septic abortions, making the ratio of septic abortions to live births approximately 1 to 14. In the period between 1972 and 1974, there was only one illegal abortion death in California.

== Abortion financing ==
Seventeen states, including California, use their own funds to cover all or most "medically necessary" abortions sought by low-income women under Medicaid, thirteen of which are required by State court orders to do so. In 2010, the state had 88,466 publicly funded abortions, of which were zero federally and 88,466 were state funded.

In the Los Angeles fetus disposal scandal, Weisberg's Medical Analytical Laboratories received nearly $175,000 in Medi-Cal payments, with $88,000 coming from pathology tests on aborted fetuses. Of this, half of it ($44,000) was paid federally through the United States Department of Health and Human Services (HHS). By the Hyde Amendment, this money was ineligible for testing on pre-abortion or post-abortion tissue, which meant the state of California would need to pay back federal funds claimed by Weisberg and by any other laboratories, according to HHS inspector Richard P. Kusserow. Kusserow also stated "prior to its closing in April, 1981, [Medical Analytical Laboratories] had routinely submitted questionable billings under the Medi-Cal program, using an erroneous billing code.... the case lacked criminal prosecutive merit due to a lack of proof that the false billings were intentional. Because the laboratory was out of business, and its owner had declared bankruptcy, there were no assets against which to proceed for civil recovery".

== Intersections with religion and religious figures ==
In 1990, John Cardinal O'Connor of New York suggested that, by supporting abortion rights, Catholic politicians who were pro-choice risked excommunication. The response of Catholic pro-choice politicians to O'Connor's comment was generally defiant. Congresswoman Nancy Pelosi asserted that, "There is no desire to fight with the cardinals or archbishops. But it has to be clear that we are elected officials, and we uphold the law, and we support public positions separate and apart from our Catholic faith."

Politicians who have been targeted in such controversies include Lucy Killea, Mario Cuomo, John Kerry, Rudy Giuliani, and Joe Biden. California's Killea's case was the first recorded.

== Abortion rights views and activities ==
=== Organizations ===
There are numerous organizations dedicated to protecting abortion rights throughout the state of California. Many of these have been active for many years.

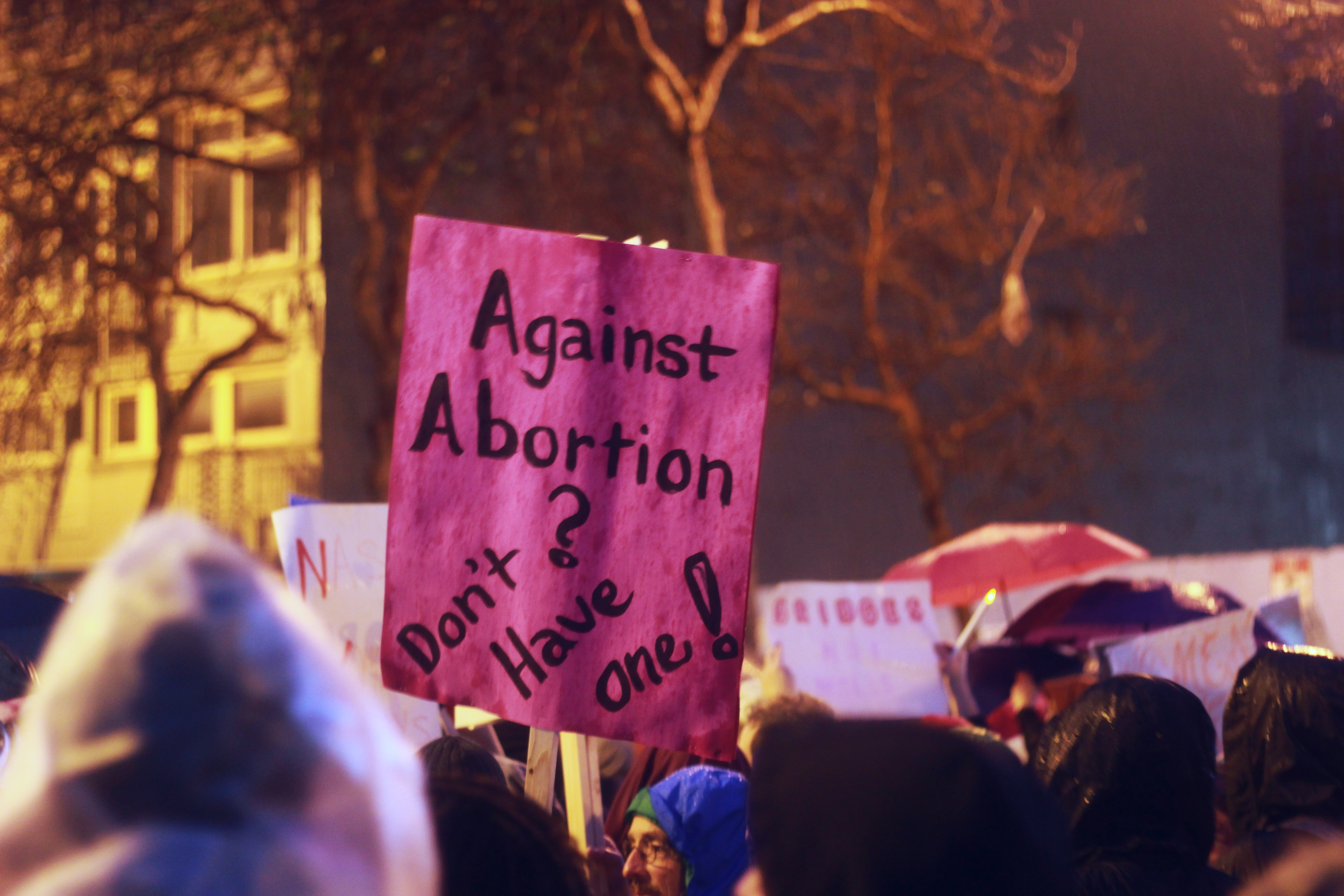
"Against abortion? Don't have one!" sign at the Women's March 2017 in San Francisco

The Society for Human Abortion was founded in 1963 in San Francisco. They sought to challenge laws around abortion by openly providing contraceptive and abortion services.

NARAL Pro-Choice California is the state affiliate of NARAL Pro-Choice America. This branch of the organization works to secure reproductive freedom specifically in the state of California

The California Future of Abortion Council is another organization that works to preserve and protect abortion rights in California. They also work to provide solutions for those from other states that are coming to California for abortions. They provide policy recommendations to the governor, as well as other political officials in California on the best actions that they can take to protect access to abortion.

=== Protests ===
#StopTheBans was created in response to 6 states passing legislation in early 2019 that would almost completely outlaw abortion. Women wanted to protest this activity as other state legislatures started to consider similar bans as part of a move to try to overturn Roe v. Wade. At least one protest as part of #StopTheBans took place in the state. Many women wore red, referencing women in Margaret Atwood's The Handmaid's Tale, at the protest in San Francisco outside City Hall. Women also protested in Los Angeles in an event organized by NARAL Pro-Choice California.

Following the overturn of Roe v. Wade on June 24, 2022, California saw protests in multiple cities in the Bay Area, including Oakland, San Jose, San Mateo, and San Francisco. Los Angeles saw protests in both Downtown and Hollywood. Other protests occurred in San Luis Obispo and the California State Capitol in Sacramento. On June 25, former child actress Jodie Sweetin (Full House) was thrown to the ground by police while protesting on a ramp of the 101 Freeway in Los Angeles. On July 28, two veterans were arrested in Los Angeles after chaining themselves to a lamppost in support of abortion rights. On July 30, 13 people were arrested and 8 people charged with vandalism following an abortion rights protest in Riverside. On August 27, several people were arrested after anti-abortion protesters clashed with abortion rights protesters at a Straight pride rally in Modesto. On September 3, three people were arrested after anti-abortion protesters clashed with abortion rights protesters in Hollywood. In San Diego County, protestors attended a candlelight vigil in Waterfront Park; others marched through downtown San Diego on June 24. The Times of San Diego counted up to 200 more protesting on June 25. Dozens protested outside Escondido City Hall in San Diego County. Santee saw a protest on June 27.

=== Political support ===
California Senator Kamala Harris held a 2020 Democratic Party Primary campaign rally in Birmingham, Alabama, on June 7, 2019. One of the messages she talked about during her rally was abortion rights in the state. During the rally, she said that if she were president, she would require the Department of Justice to review any state law restriction abortion access "if it's coming from a state that has a history of limiting those rights". This way, the US Government could make sure that such laws were constitutional before going into effect, and prevent states like Alabama from continually trying to challenge established precedent that has legalized abortion through cases like Roe v. Wade.

There was also political support for Assembly Bill 1242. It was kickstarted by Assemblymember Rebecca Bauer-Kahn, who is currently serving in the 16th district since 2018. Other supporters were Assemblymembers Mia Bonta, Cristina Garcia, as well as Gavin Newsom.

California also currently provides a website that highlights some of the most important actions that California is taking to secure abortion access since the Supreme Court's decision in Dobbs v. Jackson Women's Health Organization. This website is available in multiple languages and provides information for those seeking care from other states, helps users find a provider, financial help options, as well as more supports for other marginalized groups.

== Anti-abortion activities and views ==
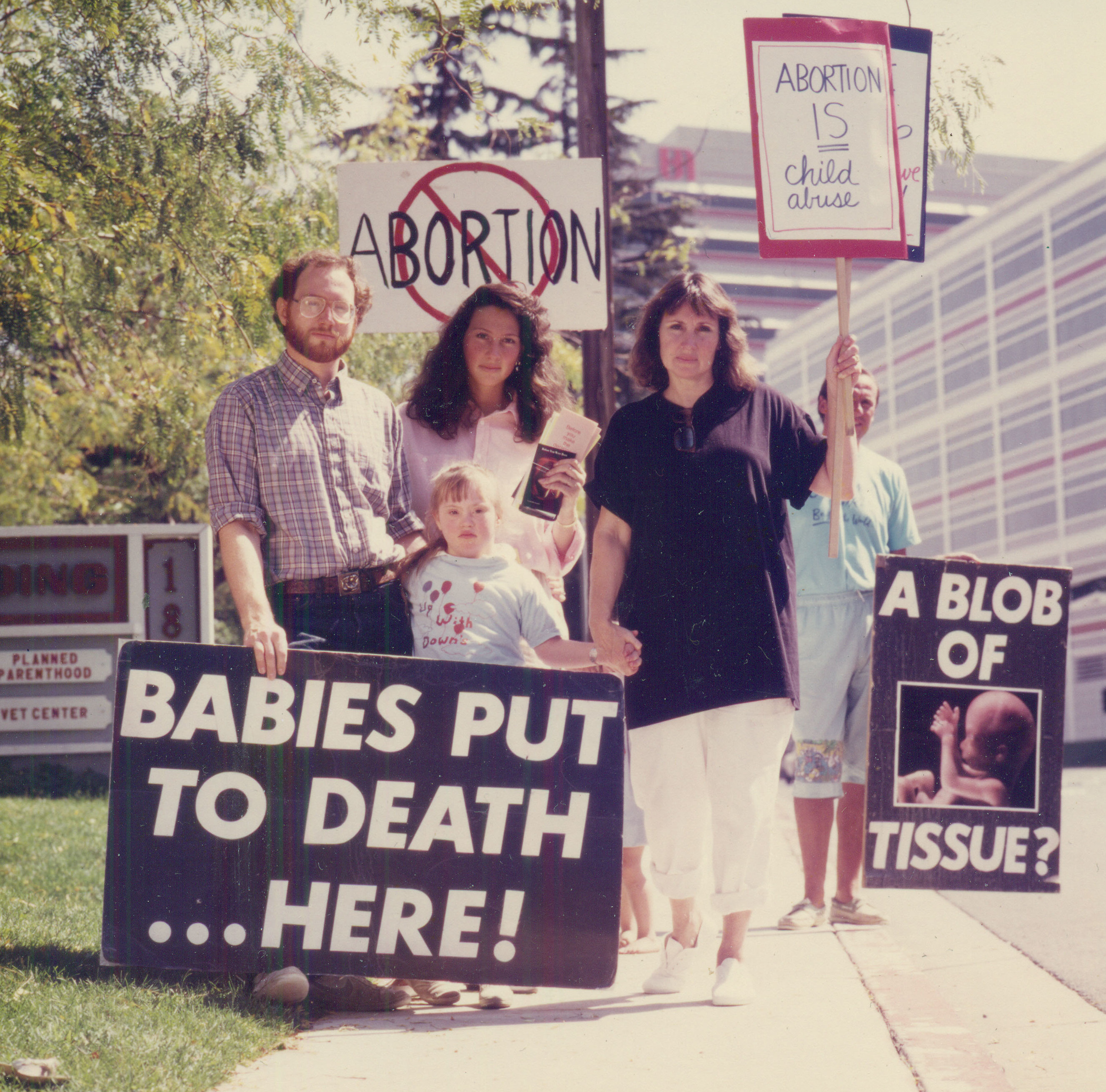
Protest outside clinic in the Bay Area, 1986

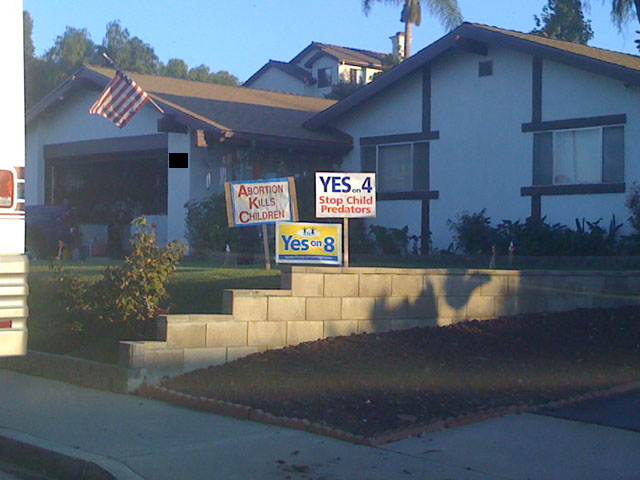
A yard with a "Yes on Proposition 8" sign and a "Yes on Proposition 4" sign, near Santee, California, in 2008

=== Activities ===
In May 1985, singer Pat Boone announced he recorded a song titled "Sixteen Thousand Faces" about the Los Angeles fetus disposal scandal, first played at a pro-life memorial service for the fetuses at Live Oak Memorial Park in Monrovia, where a granite tombstone was left with the inscription "For all those deprived of life and human love through abortion". In response, the California Abortion Rights Action League director said the service and marker "[humanized] fetuses when they deny the humanity of women already born". The ceremony was attended by "several hundred anti-abortionists", including Representative Bob Dornan and the Feminists for Life group. At the time, the fetuses had not been disposed of.

=== Protests ===
The first Walk for Life was held on January 22, 2005. Several thousand protesters (7,000, according to organizers) gathered downtown in Justin Herman Plaza and marched 2.5 miles to the Marina Green via the waterfront.

Organizers claimed 15,000 demonstrators in 2006 and 20,000 in 2007. In 2008, the San Francisco Chronicle estimated at least 10,000 people were bussed in from all over the state and beyond. On Saturday, January 24, 2009, organizers claimed "tens of thousands" of marchers. On Saturday, January 22, 2011, more than 40,000 people gathered for the seventh annual Walk, in downtown San Francisco.

=== Violence ===
On July 27, 1987, eight members of the Bible Missionary Fellowship, a fundamentalist church in Santee, California, attempted to bomb the Alvarado Medical Center abortion clinic. Church member Cheryl Sullenger procured gunpowder, bomb materials, and a disguise for co-conspirator Eric Everett Svelmoe, who planted a gasoline bomb. It was placed at the premises but failed to detonate as the fuse was blown out by wind.

Rachelle "Shelley" Shannon attempted to set fires at abortion clinics in Oregon, California, Idaho, and Nevada during the late 1980s and early 1990s, and eventually plead guilty for these cases of arson. In 1993, she would be found guilty of attempted murder of Dr. George Tiller in 1993 at his Wichita, Kansas clinic.

An incident occurred at an abortion clinic in San Francisco on February 28, 1995. On September 20, 1999, an abortion clinic in Bakersfield, California was set on fire. Another incident occurred at an abortion clinic in Modesto, California, on March 19, 2003.

A man shot at a Planned Parenthood location in Pasadena, California with a BB gun several times between June 2020 and May 2021.

In Costa Mesa, California on March 13, 2022, Planned Parenthood’s Costa Mesa Health Center in Orange County was firebombed with a Molotov cocktail. Three men were arrested and charged with conspiracy and malicious destruction of property by fire and explosion. 24-year old ex-Marine and Neo-Nazi Chance Brannon, who had participated in the attack and planned several other attacks on targets around southern California, was sentenced to 9 years in prison.
