= Lamb Funeral Home scandal =

1980s crime in California, US

Coordinates: 34.15815°N 118.14208°W

The Lamb Funeral Home in Pasadena, California was founded in 1929 by Charles F. Lamb. Charles passed the business on to his son, Lawrence Lamb, who in turn passed it on to his daughter Laurieanne Lamb-Sconce. It was a trusted family-run business until a gruesome scandal was uncovered on January 20, 1987.

In the 1980s, the funeral home on Orange Grove Boulevard was run by Jerry Sconce and his wife, Laurieanne Lamb-Sconce, the granddaughter of Charles F. Lamb. The crematory was run by their son, David Sconce. In the first year that David ran the cremation services, business went from 194 cremations annually to 1,675 and continued to exponentially grow to 8,173 in 1985. The two ovens at the crematory were running 16 to 18 hours a day and David would have the bodies packed in, sometimes making it a competition with employees to see who could fit the most bodies into an oven. His employees dubbed him "Little Hitler".

After an unsuccessful bid to construct a large crematorium failed and their crematorium burned down, David Sconce began cremating remains in kilns which led to criminal investigations being opened. Jerry and David were arrested on January 29, 1987, under the suspicion of stealing gold from corpses. A former employee testified that David had boasted about making US$5,000–6000 a month selling the gold to a jeweler. Laurieanne and Jerry were later charged with embezzling $100,000 (equivalent to $283,000 in 2025) in interest from 172 pre-paid funeral trust accounts. The three family members were initially charged with 41 criminal counts, most of them felonies.

== Allegations and charges ==
The company first came under investigation in January 1987 after officials were alerted to noxious black smoke coming from a building and smelling of burning human flesh. The Assistant Hesperia Fire Chief reported the caller said "Don't tell me they're not burning bodies; I was at the ovens at Auschwitz". Upon entering, officials found several hundreds of pounds of human remains at the Oscar Ceramics plant. Investigating the company for operating an illegal crematorium led to accusations of harvesting and stealing body parts, stealing gold teeth from corpses, falsifying death certificates and embezzling interest from prepaid funeral accounts. The family removed body parts without the consent of the deceased or their family, performed mass cremations and mixed human cremains. Under the "Costal International Eye and Tissue Bank", they sold brains, corneas, bones and organs, supposedly for research labs or schools. In a span of three months, they sold 136 brains, 145 hearts, and 100 lungs to a North Carolina firm that supplied organs to medical schools for research.

David Sconce faced five other charges for assault, robbery and conspiracy to hire men to beat up rival funeral directors. He pleaded guilty in September 1989 to those charges. In February of 1990, he was charged with first degree murder (by means of poisoning with oleander) for the death of another operator of a crematorium, Timothy Raymond Waters. The murder charge was dropped in April 1991 when the findings of toxicologist Fredric Rieders were found to be faulty and no oleander was found.

After a nine-month preliminary hearing, the three pleaded not guilty and, in 1988, were set to stand trial for a total of 67 felony and misdemeanor charges. David Sconce faced further charges of attempting to solicit the murder of his grandparents and the Deputy District Attorney, Walter H. Lewis, whom Sconce blamed for the trauma his family suffered.

The parents pled ignorance of any wrong-doings at trial, placing the blame solely on son, David Sconce.

== Acquittals and convictions ==
David pleaded guilty to 21 counts of mishandling remains in September 1989 and served about half of a five-year prison sentence. In 1997, David pleaded guilty to a murder for hire plot involving a funeral home rival and was initially sentenced to lifetime probation; however, he violated his probation which resulted in a sentence of 25 years to life in prison in 2013. He was released on parole again in 2023.

The parents were tried separately from David. In 1992 a jury found there was insufficient evidence to convict Jerry and Laurieanne of the misdemeanor charges of conducting mass cremations and comingling human remains. Laurieanne was acquitted of conspiring to sell body parts, the judge declaring a mistrial for that offence against Jerry. The jury was deadlocked on six felony charges and, ultimately, a mistrial was declared for those counts.

The charges were eventually reinstated and, in April 1995, the jury found the Sconces guilty on most of the counts they were charged with. Laurieanne and Jerry were convicted of conspiracy, failing to include required language in a trust agreement, unlawful removal of body parts, forgery and misappropriation of a trust account. Jerry and Laurieanne were acquitted of nine counts of illegally removing body parts and Laurieanne was found innocent on two counts of failing to deposit funds within 30 days. Laurieanne faced a maximum of six years in prison while Jerry faced a maximum of three years and eight months. In June 1995, Laurieanne and Jerry were each sentenced to serve three years and eight months in prison.

A lawsuit was filed in 1987; it expanded to involve six law firms filing a class-action lawsuit on behalf of the families of the estimated 16,000 decedents. The case was settled in 1992 for US$15.5 million (equivalent to $34.3 million in 2025).

== Legacy ==
The Sconce case has been the subject of three books including A Family Business by Ken Englade and Chop Shop by Kathy Braidhill.

In June of 2025, HBO aired a three-part documentary series, The Mortician, which outlined the crimes committed and included interviews with David Sconce, former employees, police who investigated the case and family members of the victims.

== See also ==
- Biomedical Tissue Services
- Harvard morgue case
- Los Angeles fetus disposal scandal
- Organ procurement
- Tri-State Crematory scandal
