= California Proposition 4 =

California Proposition 4 may refer to:

- California Proposition 4 (1911)
- California Proposition 4 (2008)
