= Killing of Mitchell Moore =

2009 filicide in Florida, U.S.

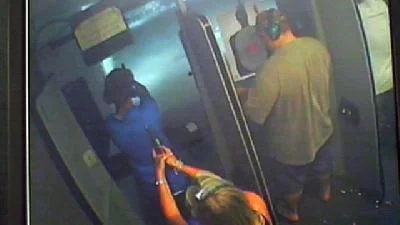
- CCTV camera footage moments before the killing
- Location: Casselberry, Florida, United States
- Date: April 5, 2009; 17 years ago 4:20 p.m. (EST)
- Attack type: Homicide–suicide by shooting; Filicide
- Deaths: 2 (both Mitchell and Marie)
- Victims: Mitchell Lee Moore, aged 20
- Perpetrators: Marie Lynn Moore, aged 44
- Motive: Mental illness; Delusions

The killing of Mitchell Lee Moore occurred on April 5, 2009, at a Shoot Straight gun range in Casselberry, Florida, United States. Moore was shot in the back of the head by his mother Marie Moore, who subsequently committed suicide.

As investigations indicated that mental illness could have been a reason for the killing, Mitchell's father sued Shoot Straight for allowing Marie inside the shooting range despite having been banned from accessing firearms due to a previous suicide attempt and hospitalization at a mental health facility.

After the suicide of a 26-year-old man at the same venue three weeks later, Shoot Straight banned firearms rentals until the state provided access to background checks, including mental health records.

== Case ==
=== Background ===
Mitchell Lee Moore was born on May 2, 1988, in Altamonte Springs, Florida, the son of Charles Marvin and Marie Moore. He had two brothers and a sister in addition to a stepbrother and a stepsister. By the time of Mitchell's killing, the Moores were divorced and both were dating new partners. Mitchell was described in his obituary in the Orlando Sentinel as a friendly young man who liked going to the beach and enjoying outdoor activities.

Marie Moore had a history of mental illness. Her former husband, Charles, said that she had been involuntarily committed in 2002 under provisions of the state's Baker Act following a suicide attempt. According to documents that Marie left for police and the gun range, she assured them that while she had been in and out of a "mental home", she was "not sick." However, as a result of that involuntary hospitalization, she had been banned from going to a shooting range.

=== Shooting ===
CCTV footage of the killing (not explicit, but graphic content due to sensitive nature of events)

In the afternoon of April 5, 2009, Mitchell and Marie went to the Shoot Straight gun range in Casselberry, Florida, some 9 mi north of Orlando. As observed by investigators in the facility's CCTV cameras footage, they shared a firing lane and interacted with other customers in the adjacent lanes as they alternated firing targets. At 4:20 p.m. (EST), footage captured by CCTV cameras show Marie raising her rented gun behind Mitchell and shooting him in the back of the head as he shot practice targets with ear protection on. Immediately after killing her son, Marie shot herself in the mouth, stumbling back against a wall with a severe gunshot wound. The other customers reported to police that mother and son seemed to be getting along fine when she approached Mitchell to kill him. CCTV cameras also caught Mitchell falling to the ground and the reaction of a patron who alerted others by pointing to the Moores's lane.

Casselberry Police Department officers arrived at the Shoot Straight facility and pronounced Mitchell dead on the scene, while Marie, who police said had slumped against the wall "gargling blood and moaning", was taken to a hospital but died soon afterward.

=== Reaction and lawsuits ===
On April 8, 2009, Casselberry Police Deputy Chief Bill McNeil said that they had "no clue (for motive). I don't even want to begin to speculate." Casselberry Police added that they had recovered three hours of audio tapes that Moore had sent to her boyfriend where she said she could explain everything. Police said that most of the audios were incoherent ramblings. In the audios handed over by Moore's boyfriend to police, she referred to her boyfriend as "King" and to herself as a "Failed Queen" and the antichrist, alleging that she had to "save her son" from hell by sending him to heaven and she going to hell instead, adding that there was "hopefully" going to be "1000 years of peace when (she) died." Marie also apologized to her boyfriend for hiding her plans from him, saying that she hid it all because he would have "Baker Acted [sic] (me) and (I) wouldn't have been able to try to save Mitch."

Additionally, Marie expressed regret at the actions she was planning and left cash and instructions for her boyfriend to take care of her truck. Police confirmed in the days that followed that the gun used by Marie to kill Mitchell had been rented inside the gun range.

Larry Anderson, a manager of Shoot Straight, said that it was unclear whether the Moores had been to the range before but stated that they were not regular customers. Anderson defended the safety policies at Shoot Straight, saying that staff required patrons to fill out a form with several questions, including whether they had been convicted of a felony or deemed mentally unstable. However, Anderson stated that they had no way to confirm the veracity of the answers and had to "assume right." Concluding his declarations, Anderson said that from Moore's writings and audios it was clear that she was "bent on doing it."

Kristen Perezluha of the Florida Department of Law Enforcement said that criminal records were available for 24 dollars but that ranges were not required to conduct background checks on customers. She added that mental health records, however, were not available for these places due to patient privacy laws.

Mitchell's father, Charles Moore, filed a wrongful death lawsuit against Shoot Straight for failing to prevent his former wife from entering the gun range despite the company knowing, according to Moore, that Marie was "unreasonably dangerous." Keith Mitnik, attorney for Moore, said that they were looking for evidence to prove that the company had banned Marie from accessing weapons at the range. An attorney for Shoot Straight, however, denied that the company knew of Marie's past mental health problems.

In January 2010, Charles Moore decided to drop the lawsuit, with Anderson and the company's lawyer recalling the shooting as a tragic incident. However, in May 2011, Moore filed a malpractice lawsuit against Morgan & Morgan and Carolyn M. Salzmann for finalizing the suit with prejudice, demanding $15,000 in damages from Morgan & Morgan and Salzmann.

== Aftermath ==
On April 27, 2009, 26-year-old Jason McCarthy of Winter Springs, Florida, killed himself with a rented gun in the same Shoot Straight range. McCarthy's family acknowledged that he had a history of mental illness, but that they never thought Jason could take his own life.

As a result of McCarthy's suicide only weeks after the killing of Mitchell Moore, Shoot Straight decided to suspend firearms rentals until the state allowed gun ranges to conduct background checks, including related to customers' mental health.
