= Who the (Bleep)... =

American TV documentary series (2013)

- Genre: Documentary
- Country of origin: United States
- No. of seasons: 2
- No. of episodes: 13

Production
- Executive producers: Pamela Deutsch; Rebecca Toth Diefenbach; Valerie Haselton Drescher
- Running time: 20 to 23 minutes
- Production company: Sirens Media

Original release
- Network: Investigation Discovery
- Release: February 1 – September 28, 2013

Related
- Who the (Bleep) Did I Marry?

Who the (Bleep)... (stylized as Who the &!*$) is an American television documentary series on Investigation Discovery that debuted on February 1, 2013. It tells the story of those who were deceived by people they never knew had such dark secrets. The series was cancelled in 2013, after its second season.

== Episodes ==
Season	Episodes	Originally released	
Season	Episodes	First released	Last released
1	12	February 1, 2013	April 5, 2013
2	3	August 31, 2013	September 28, 2013

=== Season 1 (2013) ===
No. overall	No. in season	Title	Original release date
1	1	"Truth or Heir"	February 1, 2013
Lisette Lee
2	2	"Horrible Bosses"	February 1, 2013
Compliance officer Mary Capps couldn't have been happier with her new job at City Hall, despite her uptight boss Dennis Rader. But soon his behavior toward Mary became full-on dictatorial.
3	3	"From Friend to Fiend"	February 8, 2013
Shannon Schmieder
4	4	"Immaculate Deception"	February 8, 2013
Michelle Bica
5	5	"The Lost Boy"	February 15, 2013
Warren Jeffs
6	6	"Full of Hot Air"	February 22, 2013
Balloon boy hoax
7	7	"Horror at the Homestead"	March 1, 2013
Beacher Hackney
8	8	"Sha Na Not"	March 8, 2013
Elmer Edward Solly
9	9	"First, Do No Harm"	March 15, 2013
Philip Markoff
10	10	"One Ticket to Paradise"	March 22, 2013
Ray Jackson
11	11	"Bad Medicine"	March 29, 2013
Rick D'Alessandro
12	12	"Left Seeing Red"	April 5, 2013
Anna Chapman

=== Season 2 (2013) ===
No. overall	No. in season	Title	Original release date
13	1	"Prayer and Prophet"	August 31, 2013
14	2	"Murder... To the Letter"	September 21, 2013
15	3	"Nightmare on Piedmont Street"	September 28, 2013
