= Los Angeles fetus disposal scandal =

1982 medical scandal

The Los Angeles fetus disposal scandal was the 1982 discovery of over 16,000 aborted fetuses being improperly stored at Malvin Weisberg's Woodland Hills, California, home and the ensuing legal battle regarding their disposal. It was called a "national tragedy" by then-president Ronald Reagan and inspired a song by pop singer Pat Boone, with the fetuses finally buried in 1985. No criminal charges were filed against any of the parties involved. Weisberg had stored the specimens properly but had not disposed of them due to financial difficulties.

== Discovery ==
Malvin Weisberg had operated Medical Analytic Laboratories in Santa Monica from 1976 until March 1981. He purchased a 20-foot (6.1 m) storage container in 1980, delivering it to his Woodland Hills home and paying for it with a bounced check for $1700. The container was repossessed on February 3, 1982, by the Martin Container Company, based in the Wilmington area of Los Angeles. The company opened the container on the following day, discovering the fetuses, which were stored in formaldehyde.

The initial press conference, on February 5, 1982, by the Los Angeles County Health Department said up to 500 fetuses were found. On February 24, 1982, the count of fetuses was raised to approximately 2000, with the majority of them being from the storage container and 200–300 from Weisberg's garage.

The tally of fetuses was estimated at "up to 17,000" in May 1982, and was later finally set at 16,431. A count of 193 fetuses were evidently over 20 weeks' gestation, with the oldest almost 30 weeks.

State law required the fetuses to be cremated or buried "within a reasonable time".

== Source and age of the fetuses ==
The fetuses resulted from pregnancies terminated by licensed physicians, clinics and hospitals who contracted with Medical Analytic Laboratories for pathology testing and disposal of the fetuses.

The Los Angeles County District Attorney, John Van de Kamp, said the fetuses would be individually examined and charges would be filed against the doctors if fetuses were over the 20-week gestation limit allowed by California law at the time. Officials found 193 fetuses that appeared to be over the 20-week limit. Van de Kamp wanted to turn the remaining fetuses over to groups who would perform memorial services for them.

In May 1982, California Attorney General George Deukmejian stated the gestation limit of the 1967 California abortion law was considered unenforceable because of conflicts with the 23-week Roe v. Wade ruling in 1973, but fetuses could be individually examined to determine viability, which was the legal limit. In late May, Van de Kamp stated every fetus would be examined to determine if the fetus was aborted illegally.

== Legal action ==
In 1982, President Ronald Reagan wrote a letter advocating for memorial services "for these children", referring to it as "this national tragedy".

The matter came in front of the judge because of a lawsuit filed against Van de Kamp by Carol Downer of the Los Angeles Feminist Women's Health Center and the American Civil Liberties Union. John Lynch, the chief deputy county counsel stated it was inappropriate to enjoin Van de Kamp, who was simply a "man in the middle", and that the lawsuit should be filed against abortion rights groups instead. In June 1982, Los Angeles County Superior Court judge Dickran Tevrizian issued a temporary restraining order against Van de Kamp to prevent the unconstitutional release of the fetuses to groups for burial, but allowed him to legally dispose of the fetuses, called "vague" by John Lynch, the chief deputy county counsel.

In October 1982, Van de Kamp petitioned the court to allow the burial of all but the 193 late-term fetuses in common graves at Valhalla Memorial Park Cemetery, which offered free burial. The fetuses were not buried at Valhalla, which later stated it offered the burial plot because "the right-to-life groups came to us, and we said we wouldn't endorse any political viewpoint, but we thought that interring the bodies was a proper thing to do as a service".

In December 1982, Los Angeles Superior Court judge Eli Chernow ruled the 20-week limit was unconstitutional, also ruling that Van de Kamp could bury the fetuses and anti-abortion groups could hold onsite memorial services.

By July 1983, the district attorney was Robert Philibosian, who stated he preferred a "dignified burial" and would not file charges.

In July 1984, the California Courts of Appeal overturned Superior Court of Los Angeles County judge Eli Chernow, ruling the fetuses could not be buried as human remains, which was a win for abortion rights groups and feminists. The case had been appealed by Carol Downer of the Los Angeles Feminist Women's Health Center and the American Civil Liberties Union and was denounced by the California Pro-Life Medical Association, the Catholic League. The appealing parties argued that allowing anti-abortion groups to bury the remains violated the separation of church and state. The Court's opinion stated "it is clear from the record that the Catholic League is a religious organization which regards a fetus as a human being and abortion as murder. While this specific belief may well cross sectarian lines... any state action showing a preference for this belief will be strictly scrutinized and must be invalidated". Since fetal remains are normally incinerated without ceremony, there was no reason to do otherwise with these fetuses, stating "We perceive that the intended burial ceremony will enlist the prestige and power of the state. This is constitutionally forbidden." However, religious services could hold concurrent onsite memorial services, which was praised by U.S. President Ronald Reagan in a letter to the California Pro-Life Medical Association, admiring their decision "to hold a memorial service for these children". Philibosian announced he would appeal the ruling allowing onsite memorial services. In October 1984, U.S. Supreme Court justice William Rehnquist refused to overturn the state appeals court ruling allowing the religious ceremonies. This was officially upheld by the Supreme Court in March 1985.

== Anti-abortion service ==
In May 1985, singer Pat Boone announced he recorded a song titled "Sixteen Thousand Faces" about the incident, first played at an anti-abortion memorial service for the fetuses at Live Oak Memorial Park in Monrovia, where a granite tombstone was left with the inscription "For all those deprived of life and human love through abortion". In response, the California Abortion Rights Action League director said the service and marker "[humanized] fetuses when they deny the humanity of women already born". The ceremony was attended by "several hundred anti-abortionists", including Representative Bob Dornan and the Feminists for Life group. At the time, the fetuses had not been disposed of.

== Disposition ==
In August 1985, the Los Angeles County Board of Supervisors ordered the fetuses be turned over to the Guerra-Gutirrez-Alexander Mortuary for burial. Per the court's order, the mortuary was selected because they did not have a religious affiliation. At the time, it was noted by the Los Angeles County Department of Health Services that the fetuses had been kept in "five pine boxes". The department assured ACLU that there were no identifying marks on canisters containing the fetuses, and ACLU stated they would not object to a secular burial. While ACLU would not object, the Feminist Women's Health Center petitioned the Los Angeles Superior Court to block the burial, but the courts refused.

The disposition occurred on October 6, 1985, with the fetuses in six pine boxes, which were buried at the Odd Fellows Cemetery in Boyle Heights. The anti-abortion group Feminists for Life didn't plan a full memorial service since they held a service in May, but the Americans Committed to Loving the Unwanted held a service. The Feminist Women's Health Center was dismayed over the public burial. About 250 individuals attended the service, including County Supervisor Michael D. Antonovich, who read a message from Ronald Reagan but stressed his attendance was in an unofficial capacity. Reagan's message stated "Just as the terrible toll of Gettysburg can be traced to a tragic decision of a divided Supreme Court, so also can these deaths we mourn. Once again a whole category of human beings has been ruled outside the protection of the law by a court ruling which clashed with our deepest moral convictions." Others in attendance were Representative Bob Dornan, state Senate President David A. Roberti, and state Representative Joseph Montoya. The anti-abortion group Americans Committed to Loving the Unwanted organized the service, including requesting a three-man Marine Corps color guard, who placed an American flag on a box and stood at attention throughout the service.

== Financial fallout ==
Weisberg's Medical Analytical Laboratories received nearly $175,000 in Medi-Cal payments, with $88,000 coming from pathology tests on aborted fetuses. Of this, half of it ($44,000) was paid federally through the United States Department of Health and Human Services (HHS). By the Hyde Amendment, this money was ineligible for testing on pre-abortion or post-abortion tissue, which meant the state of California would need to pay back federal funds claimed by Weisberg and by any other laboratories, according to HHS inspector Richard P. Kusserow. Kusserow also stated "prior to its closing in April, 1981, [Medical Analytical Laboratories] had routinely submitted questionable billings under the Medi-Cal program, using an erroneous billing code.... the case lacked criminal prosecutive merit due to a lack of proof that the false billings were intentional. Because the laboratory was out of business, and its owner had declared bankruptcy, there were no assets against which to proceed for civil recovery".

== See also ==
- Lamb Funeral Home scandal
- Morning Glory Funeral Home scandal
- Tri-State Crematory scandal
