= Tri-State Crematory scandal =

Scandal in Georgia, US

- Date: February 15, 2002
- Location: Noble, Georgia, United States; 34°46′27.6″N 85°15′01.8″W
- Cause: Failure of perpetrator to cremate bodies
- Arrests: Ray Brent Marsh
- Convicted: Ray Brent Marsh
- Charges: Abuse of corpses, theft by deception, burial service-related fraud, making false statements

The Tri-State Crematory scandal was a scandal at a crematorium in the Noble community in northwest Georgia that came to national attention in 2002. It was discovered that more than 300 bodies that had been consigned to the crematory for disposition had not been cremated, but instead dumped at several locations in and around the crematorium's site. This led to civil litigation and criminal prosecutions.

== Background ==
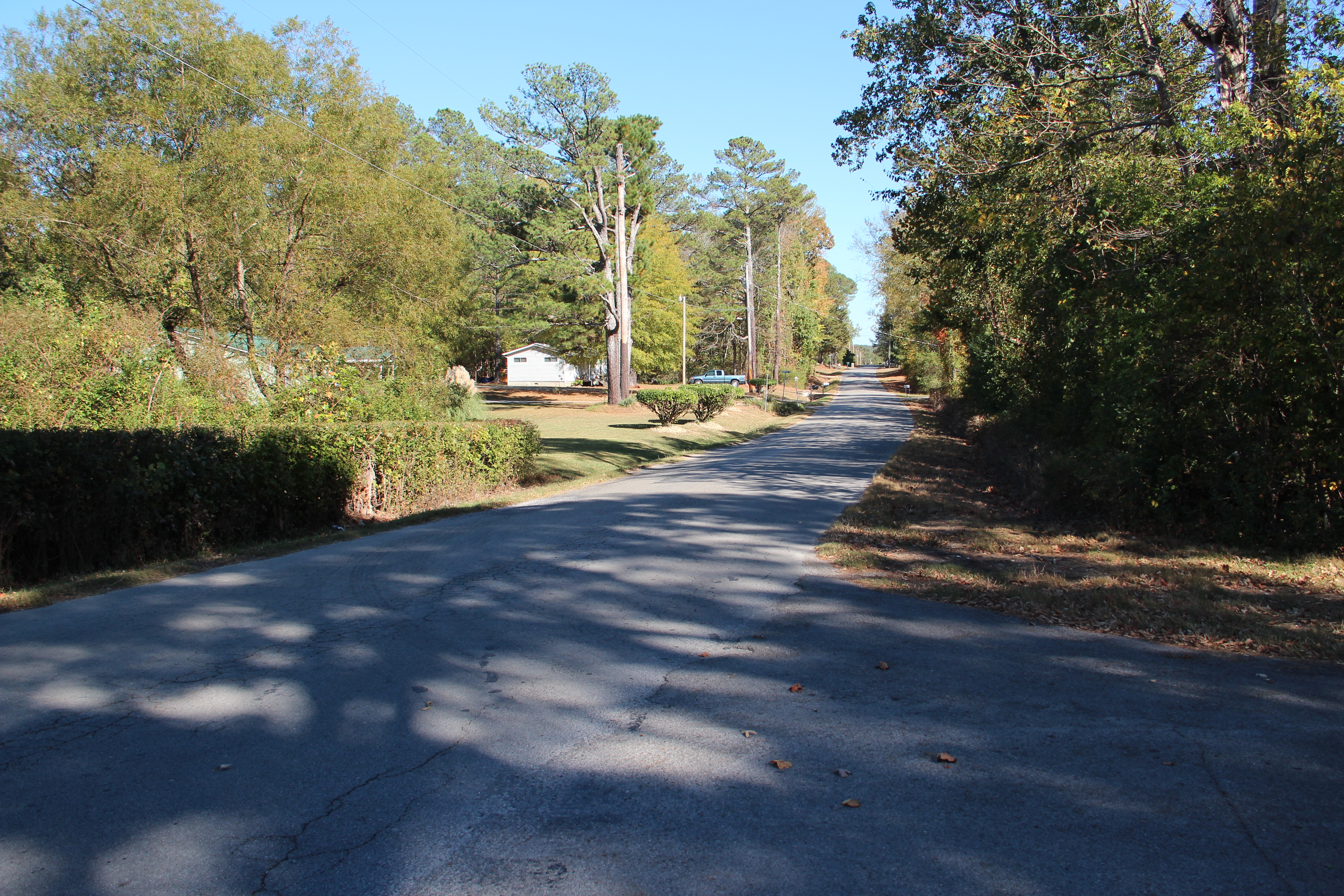
Noble, Georgia, the location of the crematorium

The crematorium was founded by Tommy Marsh in the mid-1970s and was located in the Noble community, north of the city of LaFayette in northwest Georgia. It provided cremation services for a number of funeral homes in Georgia, Alabama, and Tennessee, and made cremation an option for people in communities where it had previously been difficult to obtain.

Marsh was a respected businessman. He once ran for Coroner of Walker County, losing by fewer than 100 votes. Marsh also ran other businesses offering tent rentals and vault construction.

Marsh's health deteriorated from the mid-1990s, when he suffered several strokes and developed dementia. In mid-to-late 1996 his son, Ray Brent Marsh, took over operation of the business. On May 20, 2003, during the pendency of the litigation filed against the Marsh family, Tommy Marsh died.

Between 1996 and the date of the discovery, more than 2,000 bodies had been sent to Tri-State. At some point after Ray Brent Marsh took over the business, he apparently had technical issues with the cremation equipment. During his operation of the business, a total of 339 bodies went uncremated. Families of the deceased received urns containing other substances instead of cremated remains.

== Discovery and identification of the remains ==
In early 2002, the United States Environmental Protection Agency office in Atlanta received an anonymous tip that something was amiss at Tri-State Crematory. The EPA officers sent to investigate the property discovered a skull and some bones that were human in origin. The original human skull and bones went missing during the litigation and were never offered into evidence.

Previously, a propane delivery truck driver had complained on at least two occasions to the Walker County Sheriff's Department about seeing bodies on the Marsh property. The driver made a fuel delivery and notified the sheriff's office. This call resulted in a deputy sheriff being called to the property, who reportedly discovered nothing unusual.

On February 15, 2002, investigators returned to the property, finding piles of decomposing human bodies in a storage shed, in vaults and scattered inside and outside throughout the property. Atlanta television station WAGA/Fox 5 and reporter Dan Ronan were the first to break the news story after a nearby funeral home director called the station and informed Ronan that law enforcement officers were at the Marsh residence. In his first interview that afternoon with Walker County Sheriff Steve Wilson, Ronan recalls the Sheriff told him within a few hours the story would be "on the front page of the New York Times and the lead story on the evening newscasts." Ronan and WAGA's other reporters would spend nearly a month reporting from Walker County.

A federal disaster team was brought into the area along with a portable morgue shipped from Maryland. The team began trying to identify the remains, a process made difficult because many of the corpses were in advanced stages of decomposition. Some were little more than skeletons. Experts hired by the Marsh attorneys, Stuart James and Frank Jenkins, were prepared to testify that the methods of recovery were questionable and that the methods were made more difficult because of the lack of trained staff undertaking the investigation on the Marsh property. The experts, however, never testified because the civil cases against Tri-State and the funeral homes that had used Tri-State to perform cremation were settled after a second trial had begun in the United States District Court for the Northern District of Georgia.

The search ultimately recovered 339 uncremated bodies. Of the 339 bodies that were discovered, 113 remain unidentified. DNA testing was possible in the cases where a living relative was available.

== Investigation ==
=== Motives ===
The motives behind Brent Marsh's actions are unclear. During his guilty plea in court, he stated: "To those of you who may have come here today looking for answers, I cannot give you." Legal issues presented in the case were novel, including the crafting of the charges against Marsh. Buzz Franklin, the District Attorney of Walker County, Georgia, created law in bringing indictments against Marsh.

In response to Marsh's claim that the cremation oven, or "retort," was broken, the oven was tested and found to be partially operable but lacking maintenance.

On February 7, 2007, a week before the fifth anniversary of the discoveries at the former crematory, the criminal defense attorneys for Marsh revealed that physiological testing had indicated that Brent Marsh was a victim of mercury toxicity from the cremation of bodies with mercury dental amalgam. They stated that a faulty ventilation system exposed both Marsh and his father to toxic levels of mercury.

=== Failures of inspection, regulation and enforcement ===
The Cremation Society of North America commented in response to the case that funeral homes should use only reputable crematoria for cremation of remains, and only crematoria that they trust. The Society called the treatment of remains at Tri-State "an abuse of the most sacred trust" placed in the funeral service industry, a sentiment echoed by others in the industry.

Many in the funeral industry and government pointed to a lack of regulation and inspection as a factor contributing to the incident. Many of the funeral homes never inspected the crematory to learn its operating procedures, and never ensured that cremations were actually being carried out. Although the state of Georgia had pertinent regulations, a loophole in the law allowed crematories like Tri-State who dealt only with funeral homes to operate without a license, allowing them to go without state inspection. The state has since moved to tighten its regulations.

The Tri-State incident was representative of a larger regulatory laxity regarding crematoria in the United States. Regulation in some parts of the country had been weak; some states had no regulation at all, and except for EPA emissions regulations, many crematoria had been essentially unregulated. In Michigan, for example, a change in the law was sought by a legislator who was also a funeral director, after discovering that negligent disposal of a body was not a crime in that state. Further, even where regulation was in place lack of enforcement often remained a problem, as in Ohio which was unable to enforce its laws for a time due to a lack of trained inspectors.

== Aftermath ==
=== Criminal prosecution ===
Ray Brent Marsh was arrested on over 300 criminal violations and was ultimately charged by the State of Georgia with 787 counts, including theft by deception, abusing a corpse, burial service related fraud and giving false statements. Marsh was facing a possible prison sentence of thousands of years.

Marsh was represented by McCracken Poston and Ron Cordova. The criminal cases against Marsh were settled after the Georgia Supreme Court had certified for review the defense question of whether a human corpse had any pecuniary value, an issue vital to the case in order to determine if the thefts could even be criminally prosecuted. The traditional common law holding was that a corpse does not have pecuniary value.

Marsh eventually pleaded guilty and was sentenced to 12 years in prison, with credit for the time he had spent in custody before obtaining pretrial release on bond. He was sentenced to concurrent sentences in Georgia and Tennessee for all criminal charges related to the incident. He received a sentence of 12 years in prison as well as 75 years of probation in Georgia.

On June 29, 2016, Ray Brent Marsh was released from Central State Prison in Bibb County, Georgia, after serving his full 12-year sentence.

=== Litigation ===
Almost 1,700 members of the families of the identified corpses sued Tri-State and the funeral homes that had shipped the bodies there, and were eventually granted class-action status in two courts in two different states. Class-action status was granted by Judge Neil Thomas in Hamilton County, Tennessee Circuit Court. This case was filed by Nashville attorney David Randolph Smith. Smith associated Chattanooga defense attorney Phil Fleissner to act as co-counsel with Smith for the class. Judge Harold Murphy in the United States District Court for the Northern District of Georgia also granted class-action status after the filing of the plaintiff's master complaint.

The class certification hearings resulted in certification of a class action after hearings were held in Chattanooga in front of Judge Neal Thomas. Judge Thomas, and the Oden class action, certified the numerous cases pending in the State of Tennessee as a class action. The Tennessee class action proceeded with various hearings and motions being filed before the plaintiff class ultimately decided to proceed with the class-action filed in the United States District Court for the Northern District of Georgia. The class-action in the state of Tennessee was ultimately decertified by Judge Thomas after it was made clear that the class representative, Oden, chose to participate in the class action pending in the State of Georgia. There were numerous reasons why the class was decertified, one of them apparently being that Oden, as a class representative, made an election to participate in the national class action pending in Rome Georgia. Most of the cases filed in Tennessee, Georgia, and Alabama chose to participate in the class-action in Rome. Two trials occurred, with witnesses testifying in both trials. The trials were open to the public, and were widely reported by the news media with numerous people testifying including Dr. Kris Sperry of the Georgia Bureau of Investigation. The transcripts are public record; neither trial proceeded very far before settlements were reached.

The funeral homes sued Tri-State and Marsh, eventually settling first for $36 million with the plaintiff's class in the United States District Court for the Northern District of Georgia. Ultimately, the Marsh defendants also settled for $3.5 million after their insurer, Georgia Farm Bureau, agreed to pay the settlement. After heated negotiations among the attorneys regarding the exact terms and conditions of the settlement, the settlement failed. The parties could not effectuate a settlement that would globally resolve all cases in Tennessee, Georgia, and Alabama. The plaintiff class filed a Motion to Enforce the Settlement Agreement alleging a settlement agreement had been reached between the parties, and that the court should enforce the settlement agreement. Stuart James and Frank Jenkins responded to the motion asserting that the settlement could not be effectuated and that the parties never could complete the settlement due to the inability to reach an agreement to put together a settlement class globally resolving the cases. Judge Harold Lloyd Murphy of the United States District Court for the Northern District of Georgia thereafter ordered a second trial. The second trial began in August 2004.

Bill Brown, an attorney in Bradley County, Tennessee, chose not to participate in the class actions. In his cases, Akers, Burns & Hall, Brown alleged various causes of action against Marsh, Tri-State Crematory, and the funeral homes.

During the second trial in August 2004, the families settled with the Marsh family by agreeing to a conservation easement on the Marsh property and an uncollectable judgment against the Marsh family for $80 million, subject to a state court's pending determination that the incident was actually covered by the family's homeowner's policy. Stuart James and Frank Jenkins, the attorneys for the Marsh family in the civil litigation, crafted a judgment that was not collectable against any of the Marsh defendants. Therefore, the plaintiffs' class filed a claim against Georgia Farm Bureau in State Court, that claim settled in late 2007 for $18 million resulting in the $80 million judgment being set aside and a settlement of $18 million going to the plaintiff's class members. Georgia Farm Bureau was represented by Duke Groover and Ben Land of the State of Georgia. Georgia Farm Bureau is paying the settlement under a homeowner's policy of insurance.

Much of the earlier settlement with the funeral homes has been paid.

Several claims remain in Tennessee. Claims that are being handled by plaintiffs' attorney Bill Brown and by Terri Crawford have been dismissed by Judge Neil Thomas and the dismissal upheld by the Tennessee Court of Appeals. Brown and Crawford have requested the Tennessee Supreme Court to review the dismissal of the claims. Stuart James represents Brent Marsh in these appeals and the Tennessee Supreme Court has denied the request for appeal. The cases are dismissed pursuant to the legal findings of the Tennessee Court of Appeals in the Crawford v. Buckner Rush & Marsh decision.

Brown, on behalf of certain plaintiffs living in Bradley County, also fought to require Brent Marsh to testify in court on the claims that remain in the Bradley County Circuit Court in Cleveland, Tennessee. Brown asserted that it was time for Marsh to tell family members what happened to their loved ones' bodies, offering an explanation of what he did and what happened to those bodies.

Judge Neil Thomas, to whom the Tennessee civil cases were specially assigned, held that Marsh had waived his Fifth Amendment right upon pleading guilty to more than 700 felony counts in the State of Georgia. After consulting with his client's criminal law lawyers, Ken Poston and Ron Cordova, Stuart James argued that the circumstances of the claim permitted Marsh to continue to assert his Fifth Amendment right. Judge Thomas' ruling that Marsh had waived his right was appealed to the Tennessee Court of Appeals with the Court of Appeals reversing and remanding the issue of the Fifth Amendment to Judge Thomas for further consideration. The Court of Appeals held that Marsh could assert his Fifth Amendment right in any testimony subject to review by Judge Thomas. No further testimony has been solicited by Brown.

Walker County, Georgia also sued the Marsh family to recover the cost of its investigation into the incidents on the Marsh property. Walker County claimed that it was entitled to recover almost $2 million resulting from its investigation. Frank Jenkins and Stuart James represented the Marsh defendants in this litigation which resulted in the Walker County Superior Court, Judge Smith sitting specially, dismissing the claims. The Georgia Court of Appeals heard oral argument and issued an opinion upholding the dismissal of the claims. Walker County, through its attorneys Coppedge & Evans, amended its complaint to allege that Walker County was cleaning up an environmental hazard and is therefore entitled to recover damages. The environmental claim was also dismissed by Judge Smith, and the issues regarding the environmental claim are currently pending in the Georgia Court of Appeals.

The Georgia Court of Appeals ruled that Walker County Georgia does not have a claim under Georgia's Hazardous Site Response Act. The court ruled that the county had no standing to bring any legal claim for environmental cleanup. The attorneys for Walker County applied asking the Georgia Supreme Court to review the Court of Appeals decision. The Petition for Certiorari was denied by the Georgia Supreme Court. Walker County filed a motion for reconsideration with the Georgia spring court after they denied the County permission to appeal to the spring court. The motion was denied by the Court. All lawsuits filed by Walker County were dismissed in the claims are now at a conclusion.

The Tennessee Supreme Court also dismissed all claims maintained by people who are classified as non-next of kin, stating that non-next of kin have no standing to bring a claim under Tennessee law. One of the non-next of kin claims was maintained by Terri Crawford. Crawford was outspoken regarding these cases, and at one point during the investigation was employed by the state of Georgia and the federal government as part of the investigative team. She later brought a claim to recover money for the loss of her brother's body. After consideration by the Tennessee Court of Appeals and review by the Tennessee Supreme Court, Crawford's claim was ultimately dismissed by Judge Neil Thomas pursuant to the order of the Tennessee Court of Appeals and the order of the Tennessee Supreme Court denying any further appeal on behalf of Crawford. Under Tennessee law, non-next of kin may not bring a claim under the circumstances as alleged by plaintiffs across the state of Tennessee, Georgia, and Alabama; only next of kin may maintain a claim. The Tennessee Court of Appeals outlined a succession of who may be a next of kin depending on which next of kin survives the deceased. The ruling of the Court of Appeals resulted in a dismissal of numerous non-next of kin cases.

However, several claims were maintained in Bradley County. Bill Brown, the attorney for some claimants who are classified as next-of-kin or persons who have a contract right, fought to have Brent Marsh testify in deposition. Stuart James, the attorney for Brent Marsh, resisted the deposition, asserting that the Fifth Amendment right is still available to Marsh due to the circumstances of the case. The issue involving whether Marsh still may maintain his Fifth Amendment right was appealed to the Tennessee Court of Appeals. The Court of Appeals sent the case back for further consideration by Judge Neil Thomas on whether the Fifth Amendment is still available to Marsh, and ruled that Marsh did not have a blanket loss of his Fifth Amendment right and that the trial court should review the right on a question by question basis to see if the right is still available to Marsh. The legal issues continue in these cases, and there may be issues that will take the cases back into the appellate court system of Tennessee.

The cases in Tennessee have been on appeal on issues relating to who may bring a claim and on Fifth Amendment issues. Many of the claims are dismissed, but some remain in the issues of law surrounding the claims are still very much alive and under legal debate. All of the claims pending in the United States District Court for the Northern District of Georgia are resolved. The remainder of claims pending in Georgia, Tennessee, and Alabama have either been dismissed or resolved. This case throughout its pendency in both civil and criminal courts presented unique legal arguments and challenges for the attorneys involved in the litigation. Attorneys examined documentation that was gathered in the criminal investigation that exceeded 100,000 pages of documents, revealing methods of identification, the methodology used in investigating the claim, videos of the investigation, and numerous photographs. At one point a skull and an arm were discovered in the criminal files, both with human tissue on them. Prosecutors stated that the skull and arm were intentionally a part of the files, but after they were discovered the skull and arm were quickly removed.

In the end, all parties felt that they reached fair settlement of the litigation which included settlements of the class action cases, most of the individual cases, the criminal cases relating to identified bodies, leaving only a few claims in Bradley County.

=== Property ===
As part of the settlement reached, by spring 2005 all buildings on the Tri-State property were razed. The property will remain in a trust so that it will be preserved in peace and dignity as a secluded memorial to those whose remains were mistreated, and to prevent crematory operations or other inappropriate activities from ever taking place there. The public does not have access to the land, and the land remains titled in the Marsh family name.

== In popular culture ==
The Tri-State Crematory incident was used as the basis for a Law & Order: Criminal Intent season 2 episode "Dead" starring Kathryn Erbe, Vincent D'Onofrio and guest actor Jim Gaffigan. The case was also the backdrop for the 2011 film Sahkanaga, a fictionalized account of the events by American filmmaker John Henry Summerour, and provided inspiration for the CSI: Miami episode "Forced Entry".

Brent Hendricks' memoir, A Long Day at the End of the World: A Story of Desecration and Revelation in the Deep South (Farrar, Straus and Giroux, 2013), traces his quest to discover whether his father's remains were among those discovered at the crematory.

In 2024 journalist Shaun Raviv published the podcast series "Noble" detailing the events and the trial.

== See also ==
- Biomedical Tissue Services
- Body snatching
- Harvard morgue case
- Lamb Funeral Home scandal
- Morning Glory Funeral Home scandal
- Organ harvesting
