= Jerry Sconce =

American football coach

Biographical details
- Born: October 6, 1933; Shawnee, Oklahoma, U.S.
- Died: January 28, 2019 (aged 85); California, U.S.

Coaching career (HC unless noted)
- 1956: Citrus (assistant)
- ?: Glendora HS (CA)
- 1969: Azusa Pacific (assistant)
- 1970–1971: Cottage Grove HS (OR) (assistant)
- 1972–1977: Azusa Pacific

Head coaching record
- Overall: 24–31

Jerry Sconce was an American football coach and funeral director convicted for his involvement in the Lamb Funeral Home scandal. He was the fifth head football coach at Azusa Pacific College—now known as Azusa Pacific University—in Azusa, California, serving for six seasons, from 1972 to 1977 and compiling a record of 24–31.

== Biography ==
Jerry Sconce was born on October 6, 1933, in Shawnee, Oklahoma. He was the fifth head football coach at Azusa Pacific College—now known as Azusa Pacific University—in Azusa, California, serving for six seasons, from 1972 to 1977. and compiling a record of 24–31. He died on January 28, 2019, in California.

== Criminal charges ==
Sconce operated the Lamb Funeral Home with his wife, Laurieanne Lamb-Sconce. The Sconces and their son David were arrested on numerous charges relating to forgery of donor consent forms, removal of organs and body parts from the dead and selling them to organ banks and for scientific research, removal of gold dental fillings, and theft of funds from trust accounts. They were each sentenced to three years and eight months in prison.
