= 2008 California Proposition 4 =

Failed ballot proposition on abortion

Proposition 4
- Parent Notif. Before Terminating Minor’s Pregnancy

Results
Choice	Votes	%
Yes	6,220,473	48.04%
No	6,728,478	51.96%
Valid votes	12,948,951	100.00%
Invalid or blank votes	0	0.00%
Total votes	12,948,951	100.00%
Registered voters/turnout	17,304,428	74.83%
County results
No 50–60% 60–70% 70–80%	Yes 50–60% 60–70% 70–80%

Proposition 4, or the Abortion Waiting Period and Parental Notification Initiative, also known to its supporters as Sarah's Law, was an initiative state constitutional amendment in the 2008 California general election.

The initiative would prohibit abortion for un-emancipated minors until 48 hours after physician notifies minor's parent, legal guardian or, if parental abuse has been reported, an alternative adult family member.

Proposition 4 was rejected by voters on November 4, 2008.

== Specific provisions ==
The proposed initiative, if enacted as a constitutional amendment, would:

- Provide exceptions for medical emergency or parental waiver.
- Permit courts to waive notice based on clear and convincing evidence of minor's maturity or best interests.
- Mandate reporting requirements, including reports from physicians regarding abortions on minors.
- Authorize monetary damages against physicians for violation.
- Require minor's consent to abortion, with exceptions.
- Permit judicial relief if minor's consent is coerced.

== Fiscal Impact ==
- Health and Social Services Costs. Annual costs in the range of $4 million to $5 million for the state and about $2 million for counties, and potential one-time Medi-Cal automation costs unlikely to exceed a few million dollars.
- Costs to Local Law Enforcement and Courts. Annual costs in the range of $5 million to $6 million per year.
- Potential Offsetting Savings. Unknown, potential savings to the state in health care and public assistance costs from decreases in sexually transmitted diseases and teen pregnancy.

== Supporters ==
- The Friends of Sarah, the Parental or Alternative Family Member Notification Act. is the official ballot committee.
- Gov. Arnold Schwarzenegger

=== Arguments in favor of Prop. 4 ===
Notable arguments that have been made in favor of Prop. 4 include:

- 34 other U.S. States have had notification laws in place for as long as 25 years.
- When a minor obtains an abortion without the knowledge of a family member or guardian, her health can be endangered if health complications arise after the abortion.
- If a minor becomes pregnant because of sexual violence or predation, a sexual predator may be missed, because the abortion clinic may not report the sexual crime.

=== Donors ===
As of September 27, 2008, the six largest donors to Prop. 4 are:

- Jim Holman, $1,525,590. (Of this, $1.35 million is listed as a loan.)
- Don Sebastiani, $530,000.
- Knights of Columbus, $200,000.
- Life Legal Defense Foundation, $50,000.
- The Lenawee Trust, $100,000.
- The Caster Family Trust, $100,000.

== Path to ballot and prior attempts at passage ==
The signature-gathering drive to qualify the 2008 Parental Notification petition for the ballot was conducted by petition management firm Bader & Associates, Inc. at a cost of $2,555,000.

Proposition 4 represents the third time that California voters will have considered the issue of a parental notification/waiting period for abortion. The two previous, unsuccessful, initiatives were California Proposition 85 (2006) and California Proposition 73 (2005).

When Prop 73 lost in 2005, some supporters thought that a similar measure would fare better in a general election. However, Prop 85 did worse. Unlike 85 or 73, Proposition 4 allows an adult relative of the minor seeking an abortion to be notified, if the minor's parents are abusive.

Camille Giulio, a spokeswoman for the pro-4 campaign said that the November 2008 election represents a better opportunity for parental notification legislation because:

- There will be a higher voter turnout in November 2008 than when 85 and 73 were voted on.
- Socially conservative voters will be motivated to come to the polls to vote in favor of the much higher profile Proposition 8. While at the polls, they are likely to also vote in favor of 4.
- The two previous campaigns represented narrow defeats in low budget campaigns.

Year	Proposition	Votes for	% for	Votes against	% against
2005	Prop 73	3,676,592	47.2%	4,109,430	52.8%
2006	Prop 85	3,868,714	45.8%	4,576,128	54.2%
2008	Prop 4	4,761,465	48.0%	5,157,174	52.0%

== Opposition to Prop. 4 ==
The Campaign for Teen Safety is the official ballot committee against the proposition.

- American Academy of Pediatrics, California District
- American College of Obstetricians and Gynecologists, District IX
- California Academy of Family Physicians
- California Family Health Council
- California Nurses Association
- California School Counselors Association
- California Teachers Association
- Planned Parenthood Affiliates of California
- California NOW
- Equality California
- The Let California Ring coalition

=== Arguments against Prop. 4 ===
Notable arguments that have been made against Prop. 4 include:

- Mandated parental notification laws do not work. No law can mandate family communication.
- Some teenagers can't go to their parents for fear of being forced to leave their home, abuse, or worse.
- Prop 4 may force these teens to delay medical care, turn to self-induced abortions, or consider suicide.
- The reason there are fewer teen pregnancies in states mandating parental notification is that more teenage girls choose to go underground and have unsafe abortions which go unreported.
- Fear of parents being notified in the event of an abortion is highly unlikely to motivate teens to practice abstinence.
- This proposition is extremely gender-biased. It is unlikely that any law would mandate the notification of the father's parents.
- The vote will be biased as those affected by the bill, namely minors, are unable to vote on it.
- If a teen seeks the support of another adult, her parents would automatically be reported to authorities, and an investigation would ensue.

=== Consultants ===
The No on 4 campaign has hired the Dewey Square Group as a consultant.

=== Donors to opposition ===
As of September 27, some of the top donors to the opposition campaign were:

- A number of different Planned Parenthood affiliates, including the Los Angeles, Mar Monte, Orange, Riverside, San Bernardino, San Diego, Santa Barbara, Shasta Diablo and Pasadena offices, $4,485,000
- California Teachers Association, $450,000.
- California Family Health Council, $80,000.
- Committee for a New Economy, $25,000.
- ACLU, Northern California, $50,000.
- ACLU, Southern California, $10,000.
- Susan Orr, $100,000.
- John Morgridge, $100,000.

== Lawsuit filed over Prop. 4 language ==
Planned Parenthood Affiliates of California and others filed a lawsuit with the Sacramento County Superior Court in early August to strike out all references to "Sarah" and "Sarah's Law" and "other misleading language in the voter's guide" for Proposition 4. The title "Sarah's Law" refers to the case of 15-year-old "Sarah" who died as a result of an abortion in 1994. Proposition 4's ballot language in the official voter's guide suggests that "Sarah" might have been saved had her parents known about her abortion. Opponents of Proposition 4 argue that "Sarah" was not considered a minor in Texas, where the abortion was performed, and that she already had a child with a man who claimed to be her common-law husband. If this is the case, the proposed law, Proposition 4, would not have helped her, since it wouldn't have applied to her. Based on this reasoning, opponents asked that the references to Sarah be stricken.

Judge Michael Kenny of the Sacramento Superior Court ultimately ruled against the opponents, allowing the original proposed ballot language and arguments, including references to Sarah, to stay in the official California voter's pamphlet.

== Polling information ==
The Field Poll has conducted and released the results of four public opinion polls on Proposition 4, in July, August, September, and October.

Mark DiCamillo, director of the polling agency, said he believes the current version is running stronger because Latinos overwhelmingly favor it and are expected to vote in higher-than-usual numbers in November.

Month of Poll	In Favor	Opposed	Undecided
July 2008	48 percent	39 percent	13 percent
August 2008	47 percent	44 percent	9 percent
September 2008	49 percent	41 percent	10 percent
October 2008	45 percent	43 percent	12 percent

== Newspaper endorsements ==
=== Editorial boards in favor ===
- San Diego Union Tribune
- Orange County Register

=== Editorial boards opposed ===
- Los Angeles Times
- San Francisco Chronicle

== Results ==
Proposition 4
Choice	Votes	%
For	6,220,473	48.04
Against	6,728,478	51.96
Total	12,948,951	100.00
Valid votes	12,948,951	94.22
Invalid/blank votes	794,226	5.78
Total votes	13,743,177	100.00
Registered voters/turnout		79.42
Source: November 4, 2008, General Election Statement of Vote
