= Central State Prison =

Prison in Georgia, United States

Coordinates: 32°46′38″N 83°45′07″W

- Interactive map of Central State Prison
- Location: 4600 Fulton Mill Road Macon, Georgia
- Status: open
- Security class: medium
- Capacity: 1153
- Opened: 1978
- Managed by: Georgia Department of Corrections

Central State Prison is located in unincorporated Bibb County, Georgia, United States. The facility is operated by the Georgia Department of Corrections.

The facility houses adult male felons, the capacity is 1153. It was constructed in 1978 and opened in 1978. It is a Medium Security Prison.

== Notable immate ==
Ray Brent Marsh—perpetrator of the Tri-State Crematory scandal; served twelve years. Released in 2016.
