= Who the (Bleep) Did I Marry? =

American TV series

- Genre: Documentary
- Country of origin: United States
- No. of seasons: 7
- No. of episodes: 101

Production
- Executive producers: Pamela Deutsch; Rebecca Toth Diefenbaach; Valerie Haselton
- Running time: 21 to 22 minutes (excluding commercials)
- Production company: Sirens Media

Original release
- Network: Investigation Discovery
- Release: August 25, 2010 – December 4, 2023

Related
- Who the (Bleep)...

Who the (Bleep) Did I Marry? is an American documentary television series on Investigation Discovery. The series debuted on August 25, 2010. The series tells the story of people—mostly women—who find out their spouse has committed a crime before or during their marriage. After a seven-year hiatus, the series returned on October 15, 2022, for Season 7. Unlike the previous seasons, Season 7's episodes run for a full hour.

== Series overview ==
Season	Episodes	Season premiere	Season finale
1	13	August 25, 2010	November 10, 2010
2	18	July 13, 2011	February 11, 2012
3	20	July 11, 2012	November 7, 2012
4	17	August 31, 2013	September 27, 2014
5	15	December 20, 2014	March 30, 2015
6	8	June 4, 2015	July 2, 2015
7	10	October 15, 2022	December 4, 2023

The series covered some of the most notorious American cases from recent years including: Gary Ridgway, Amy Fisher, John Allen Muhammad, Jodi Arias, Michael Mastromarino, Scott Peterson, Scott Erskine and more.

== Who the (Bleep)... ==
The show received a spinoff named Who the (Bleep)... where ex-neighbours and friends tell their stories in a similar fashion.
