= Morgan & Morgan =

American law firm

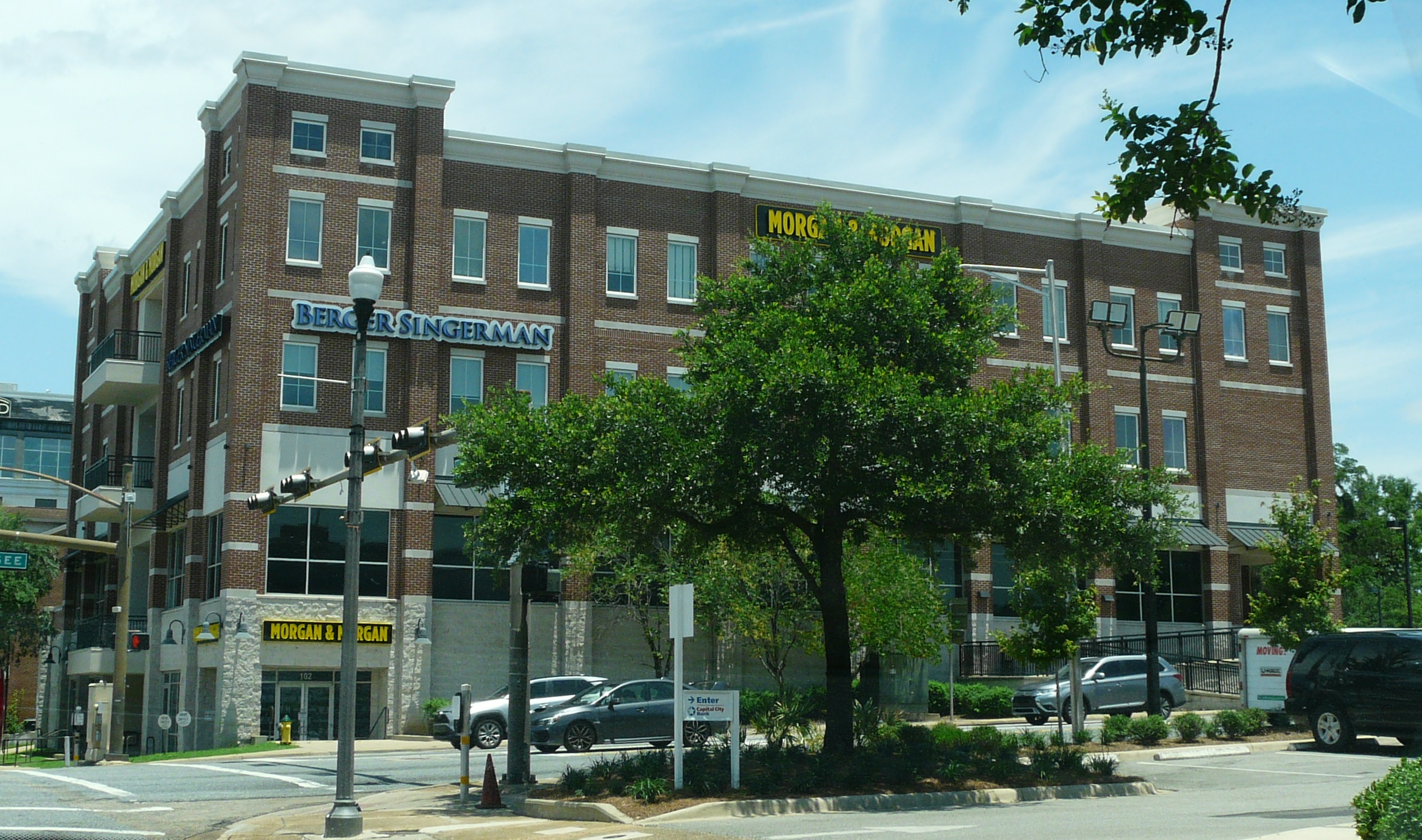
- Morgan & Morgan office in Tallahassee, Florida
- Type: Limited liability partnership
- Industry: Law
- Founded: November 22, 1988; 37 years ago
- Founder: John Morgan
- Headquarters: Orlando, Florida, United States
- Number of locations: 140 offices (2025)
- Services: Personal injury, civil rights, class actions, medical malpractice
- Number of employees: 6,000+, including 1,000+ attorneys (2025)
- Website: forthepeople.com

Morgan & Morgan is an American law firm. Founded in 1988 by John Morgan, it is headquartered in Orlando, Florida. The firm initially focused on personal injury, medical malpractice, and class action lawsuits, and later expanded into additional practice areas. Morgan & Morgan employs over 1,000 attorneys across the United States.

== History ==
=== Early years ===
The law firm was established in Orlando, Florida, in 1988 by John Morgan and his partners, Stewart Colling and Ron Gilbert.

In 1989, the law firm began advertising on television and radio. In 2005, Morgan bought out his partners' shares of the firm and renamed it Morgan & Morgan, adding his wife, Ultima, as a partner. The Orlando Sentinel cited a "fundamental difference over growth and expansion of the law firm" as the reason for the firm's split.

=== 2000–2020 ===
By the early 2000s, the firm had expanded throughout Florida with 420 employees. In 2013, the firm had 260 attorneys among 1,800 staffers in Florida, Georgia, Mississippi, Kentucky, and Manhattan.

In January 2011, Charlie Crist joined the Tampa office of Morgan & Morgan after expressing an interest in returning to the legal field during his final week in office as governor of Florida. Crist worked primarily in the firm's class-action sector as a complex-litigation attorney, serving as a "rainmaker" for the firm. In November 2016, after almost six years with the firm, he was elected to represent Florida's 13th congressional district. In February 2018, Brad Slager of Sunshine State News alleged that the firm was removing references to its relationship with Crist from its materials after his election to Congress.

In 2016, as part of efforts to manage Morgan & Morgan's increasing case volume, John Morgan and Reuven Moskowitz co-founded Litify, a cloud-based case management platform built on Salesforce. Originally developed for internal use, the platform was later made available to other law firms.

In 2018, the firm received over two million phone calls and signed up 500 new cases each day. That year, the firm reportedly collected $1.5 billion in settlements and spent $130 million nationwide on advertising. John Morgan was one of the first lawyers to advertise in phone books and television commercials.

=== 2020–present ===
By the early 2020s, Morgan & Morgan had been characterized in legal and business publications as one of the largest personal injury and class action law firms in the United States. The firm’s expansion was often attributed to a broad consumer advertising campaign that included television and radio commercials, billboards, public transit displays, social media, and sponsorships. Some commentators referred to its impact on regional legal markets as the "Morgan & Morgan effect".

In 2021, Morgan fired half of his firm's marketing department. The staffing purge came in the wake of a controversial Morgan & Morgan national advertising campaign, "Size Matters", which was meant to convey the large scale of the firm, but was criticized for being an inappropriate dick joke. The staffers who were fired had criticized the ad campaign's implications.

Morgan & Morgan was listed in Law360’s annual “Law360 400” survey, which ranks the largest U.S. law firms by domestic attorney headcount, appearing in the top 50 firms by size for the year 2024.

As of 2025, the law firm had over 6,000 employees, including 1,000 lawyers, in more than 100 offices in 50 U.S. states and Washington, D.C.

In 2026, a Georgia arbitrator awarded a former client of Morgan & Morgan $4.3 million for settling his case without his consent.

In September 2026, Morgan & Morgan said it had committed to invest at least $1 billion in artificial intelligence and technology over the next ten years, and that it had spent $300 million developing an in-house artificial intelligence platform, MX2, which it said it uses to extract medical information, generate case documents and prepare for trials. The firm said the platform had nearly 5,000 monthly users, and that it planned to make it available to other law firms on an invitation-only basis by the end of 2027.

== Lawsuits ==
Morgan & Morgan filed a class action lawsuit regarding the Equifax data breach that occurred in 2017.

In 2009, Morgan & Morgan represented Charles Marvin Moore of Altamonte Springs, Florida, who filed a wrongful death claim against Shoot Straight gun range in Casselberry, Florida, after his former wife shot and killed their son Mitchell inside the shooting range, despite the woman being banned from accessing firearms due to past hospitalizations under the Baker Act. After Moore dropped the wrongful-death suit in January 2010, he filed a separate legal action in May 2011 against Morgan & Morgan and former firm attorney Carolyn M. Salzmann, alleging that the case had been dismissed with prejudice and seeking $15,000 in damages. Morgan & Morgan stated that Salzmann was no longer employed by the firm and that it had separately sued her over money it alleged she owed the firm.

In 2018, the firm, along with co-counsels DiCello Levitt & Casey, and Robbins Geller Rudman & Dowd, filed a lawsuit following a data breach that allegedly affected approximately 230 million Americans and 110 million businesses.

In a case brought by Morgan & Morgan, Florida-based Healogics Inc. agreed in 2018 to pay $22.51 million to settle False Claims Act allegations that it knowingly billed Medicare for medically unnecessary services.

The firm represented several victims of the Sand Blaster roller coaster derailment on June 15, 2018, at the Daytona Beach Boardwalk.

It was among the law firms acting on behalf of the plaintiffs in the 2015 California gas leak case.

On October 6, 2022, Bethenny Frankel filed suit against TikTok Inc. in the U.S. District Court for the Southern District of New York after Frankel learned that her images and video content were being used to sell counterfeit products. The lawsuit focused on TikTok's technology, owned by the Chinese company ByteDance, which allowed users to create fake images and videos in which Bethenny Frankel appeared promoting various goods and services in violation of Frankel's right of publicity.

Following a mass shooting incident at a Walmart Supercenter attorneys from the Morgan & Morgan filed two lawsuits on behalf of employees against Walmart, each seeking $50 million in damages.

The firm filed a lawsuit arising from the 2023 Ohio train derailment.

In December 2023, the law firm filed cases against pharmaceutical companies Novo Nordisk and Eli Lilly, alleging that the GLP-1 drugs Ozempic and Mounjaro caused severe gastrointestinal injuries such as gastroparesis. Representing plaintiff Jaclyn Bjorklund in federal court in Louisiana, the firm also petitioned for the consolidation of related cases before the U.S. Judicial Panel on Multidistrict Litigation.

Beginning in 2023, Morgan & Morgan represented families in civil lawsuits arising from the Harvard morgue case, in which body parts donated for research through Harvard Medical School's anatomical gift program were allegedly stolen and sold, and the remains mishandled, causing emotional distress. In 2025, the Massachusetts Supreme Judicial Court allowed key claims in those cases to proceed, ruling that plaintiffs could pursue certain negligence and related theories against Harvard and other defendants.

In October 2024, the firm filed a wrongful death lawsuit against Boar's Head over a fatal listeria infection allegedly linked to its products.

In December of that year, Morgan & Morgan initiated a lawsuit on behalf of 18-year-old Bryce Martinez from Pennsylvania, alleging that eleven major food manufacturers, including Coca-Cola, PepsiCo, and Nestlé, contributed to his Type 2 diabetes and fatty liver disease through the promotion of addictive ultra-processed foods. The case, filed in Philadelphia, alleged that the companies intentionally created harmful products without adequate health warnings.

The firm also brought a sexual assault case against prominent individuals in the luxury real estate sector.

In 2025 the firm sued when a woman died inhaling nitrous oxide from a company's product and alleged there was inadequate fire safety at a Massachusetts assisted-living facility.

In 2025, Morgan & Morgan secured a US$3 million verdict in a Takata airbag injury case.

In July 2025, the firm represented former Florida state senator Daphne Campbell in a wrongful death lawsuit over the shooting of her son at a North Miami Beach condominium complex, obtaining a jury verdict of US$100 million against the property’s owners and managers.

Morgan & Morgan also represented a class of smartphone users in a California data privacy lawsuit alleging that Google improperly tracked users' locations. In September 2025, a jury awarded approximately US$425.7 million in damages, one of the largest verdicts to date in a U.S. consumer privacy case.

== Political involvement ==
The 2016 Florida Amendment 2 initiative was a political and legal campaign to allow the use of medical marijuana. In 2013, Morgan & Morgan launched the initiative to change the Florida Constitution to allow marijuana for medical purposes. The firm spent over $15 million to support the change and organized the United for Care campaign to promote the "Yes" vote.

John Morgan donated to Hillary Clinton's 2016 presidential campaign. Morgan gave $355,000 to the Biden Victory Fund in August 2020. Politico reported that Morgan is close to Frank Biden, Joe's younger brother. The outlet also reported that Morgan flew Frank to Joe Biden's inauguration on Morgan's private jet and said that he discussed job opportunities at Morgan & Morgan with him.

In 2017, Morgan & Morgan contributed $1.5 million toward a proposed Florida constitutional amendment to raise the hourly minimum wage to $15. When Orlando Weekly reported that some employees at Morgan & Morgan made less than $15 per hour, Morgan said, "I can tell what angle you're getting at with this story, and it's bullshit," saying that many of his call center employees start out with a $25,000 annual salary (an hourly wage of $15/hour is equal to roughly $31,200 a year), and told a reporter, "I bet you don't make $25,000 a year."

The 2020 Florida Amendment 2 was an initiative to amend the Florida Constitution to change the state's minimum wage to $15 per hour. The amendment passed on November 3, 2020 by a statewide referendum. Morgan & Morgan donated $1 million to support the amendment.

== AI-generated case citations ==
In February 2025, three attorneys from Morgan & Morgan's Wyoming office were sanctioned by the U.S. District Court for the District of Wyoming after submitting a court motion that contained eight fabricated case citations produced by an AI tool. The primary attorney responsible, Rudwin Ayala, acknowledged improperly relying on an AI tool that produced fabricated case citations. Ayala was fined $3,000 and had his pro hac vice admission revoked, while supervising attorneys T. Michael Morgan and Taly Goody each received a $1,000 fine for failing to adequately verify the filing.

Following the judge's decision, Morgan & Morgan withdrew the problematic motion, reimbursed opposing counsel's legal fees, and implemented firm-wide corrective measures, including additional attorney training on AI use, stricter verification protocols for AI-generated content, and an explicit requirement for independent citation checks. The court declined to sanction the firm itself, citing these prompt remedial actions as mitigating factors.

In May 2026, Suffolk County Superior Court Judge Kenneth Salinger denied T. Michael Morgan a request to appear before him in a case against Harvard Medical School, citing the previous use of AI-generated case citations.

== Other ventures ==
=== Community involvement ===
In 2013, Morgan & Morgan contributed $2 million to fund the Morgan & Morgan Hunger Relief Center, a 100,000-square-foot facility operated by Second Harvest Food Bank of Central Florida.

The firm was instrumental in establishing Boys Town Orlando in 1985, a facility supporting at-risk youth, and was involved in fundraising for Annunciation Catholic Academy in Altamonte Springs. Other charity activities include contributions to homeless outreach programs and educational institutions, notably $1 million each to the University of Florida's law school and the Community Resource Network of Central Florida.

=== Collaborations ===
Following the NCAA's 2021 policy change on Name, Image, and Likeness (NIL), Morgan & Morgan began signing collegiate athletes to endorsement deals, starting with four University of Kentucky football players in July 2021. In April 2022, the firm became a sponsor of the Boston Red Sox, marking the team's first sponsorship deal with a law firm. Morgan & Morgan subsequently supported the team’s Donated Ticket Program. By 2024, the firm had established over 50 athlete endorsement agreements, including with the Kentucky Wildcats men's basketball team, Brock Bowers of the Georgia Bulldogs, and University of Southern California basketball players JuJu Watkins and Boogie Ellis.

In 2024, Morgan & Morgan signed sponsorship deals with UFC and the Pittsburgh Penguins and launched charitable campaigns with the Miami Heat and Arizona Diamondbacks tied to in-game events.

In March 2025, the firm sponsored actor and racecar driver Frankie Muniz, serving as the primary sponsor of his NASCAR Craftsman Truck Series entry for four races in the 2025 season. The following month, WWE named Morgan & Morgan as its official law firm under a multi-year agreement, including branding at WWE events. In May of that year, the firm launched an advertising campaign, "There’s a Reason", that included a cameo by NASCAR driver Kyle Busch.
