= 2006 California Proposition 85 =

Proposition 85
- Waiting Period/Parental Notification

Results
Choice	Votes	%
Yes	3,868,714	45.81%
No	4,576,128	54.19%
Valid votes	8,444,842	100.00%
Invalid or blank votes	0	0.00%
Total votes	8,444,842	100.00%
Registered voters/turnout	15,837,108	53.32%
County results
For
60%–70%
50%–60%
Against
70%–80%
60%–70%
50%–60%

California Proposition 85, the Parental Notification Initiative, was a proposition on the ballot for California voters in the general election of November 7, 2006. It was similar to the previous year's Proposition 73. It failed by a vote of 46%-54%.

== Text from the California Voter Information Guide ==
Parental Notification before Termination of Teen's Pregnancy (second attempt at Proposition 73)

- PDF Document File of Official Voter Information Guide: Proposition 85

== Summary ==
Summary as prepared by the State Attorney General "Amends California constitution prohibiting abortion for unemancipated minor until 48 hours after physician notifies parent/guardian, except in medical emergency or parental waiver. Mandates reporting requirements. Authorizes monetary damages against physicians for violation. Put on ballot by Petition Signatures."

Did not pass

- 3,868,714 (45.8%) voted for it
- 4,576,128 (54.2%) voted against it

== Goals ==
- Increase teen communication with parents
- Allow parents to help child make appropriate health care decisions
- Provide needed health care history to physicians
- Possibly prevent minor from something as traumatic as an abortion
- Provide a strong support system

== Vote meaning ==
A "yes" vote to this would mean that the state constitution would require a physician to notify the guardian of a minor prior to performing an abortion.

A "no" vote to this would mean minors would continue to receive abortion services to the same extent as adults. Physicians performing abortions for minors would not be subject to notification requirements.

== Background ==
- 1953 - Law was created that enabled minors to have abortions without parental consent or knowledge
- 1987 - Legislature amended this law to require minors to get parental or guardian consent before having an abortion performed
- 1997 - Voted against the law therefore allowing minors to have an abortion without consent or knowledge by guardian

== Exceptions to Proposition 85 ==
Medical Emergencies: An abortion is necessary to preserve the life of the mother

Waivers Approved by Guardian: Guardian signs a waiver that gets rid of the notification requirements

Waivers Approved by Court: Waiver given to a minor who asks for it and if the courts finds the minor to be well informed and mature enough to make the decision to have the abortion

== Penalty ==
Any person who performs an abortion on a minor without consent by parents or guardian would be found guilty of a misdemeanor punishable by fine.

=== Endorsements ===
- Sharon Runner
- Ben Stein
- Bill O'Reilly
- Dr. Laura Schlessinger
- Laura Ingraham
- Jim Holman, San Diego Reader
