= Biomedical Tissue Services =

Defunct human tissue recovery firm

Biomedical Tissue Services (BTS) was a Fort Lee, New Jersey, human tissue recovery firm. It was shut down by the U.S. Food and Drug Administration (FDA) on October 8, 2005, after its president, Michael Mastromarino, and three other employees were charged with illegally harvesting human bones, organs, tissue and other cadaver parts from individuals awaiting cremation, for forging numerous consent forms, and for selling the illegally obtained body parts to medical companies without consent of their families.

== History ==
In late 2005, the New York City Police Department investigated Michael Mastromarino and his company BTS for allegedly selling stolen human body parts. The probe was first reported by the New York Daily News in October 2005, and led to a number of exhumations, including one of a Queens woman who had had many of her bones removed and replaced with PVC piping, which is a typical industry practice for cosmetic reconstruction of tissue donors. According to government witnesses, BTS sought business relationships with a number of funeral homes in New York and Pennsylvania solely to obtain access to recently deceased people, often paying the funeral homes $1,000 or more per corpse. In nearly every case, BTS employees obtained human allograft tissue, bones, ligaments and other cadaver material by forging family consent and other donor forms without actual authorized consent, and often against the written wishes of families. BTS employees engaged in highly irregular and unsafe practices, such as allowing cadavers to deteriorate before collecting tissue and parts, not testing donor material for diseases such as HIV/AIDS, and even accepting cancerous and other diseased cadavers for harvesting and selling. Under federal regulatory guidelines for the proper care and management of donated human tissue, firms are required to "screen and test donors for relevant communicable disease agents and diseases and to ensure that HCT/Ps (Human Cells, Tissues, and Cellular and Tissue-based Products) are processed in a way that prevents communicable disease contamination and cross-contamination."

To conceal their practices, BTS employees forged a variety of the necessary certificates and replaced bone with PVC piping to conceal the harvesting from family members of the deceased. Of the numerous companies who purchased the illegally obtained body parts or tissue, none had ever contacted the family member listed on the consent forms to verify the consent, or even had verified the consenting family member's existence. The BTS scandal became international news after it was determined that the remains of the deceased broadcaster Alistair Cooke were among those that had been violated and sold in New York. The Cooke case was featured on a 2008 episode of Horizon, "How Much Is Your Dead Body Worth?"

Michael Mastromarino, the 42-year-old former New Jersey–based oral surgeon and CEO and executive director of operations of BTS, was convicted in February 2006, along with three employees of wrongdoing and sentenced to prison terms. Mastromarino and Lee Cruceta, one of the convicted employees, agreed to a deal that resulted in their imprisonment. Mastromarino was sentenced on June 27, 2008, in the Supreme Court in Brooklyn, New York, to between 18 and 54 years in prison. Director Toby Dye made the documentary Body Snatchers of New York about this case in 2010.

On September 4, 2008, defense attorneys for human graft tissue distributors asked U.S. District Judge William J. Martini to dismiss hundreds of charges, asserting that the companies "never knew the body parts were illegally obtained, and they say there is no evidence the transplanted tissue made anyone ill."

According to the FDA, all tissue products collected and distributed by BTS were recalled and will be monitored for a complete accounting of all graft material. BTS sold its products to five companies; two of the companies were Life Cell Corporation, of New Jersey, and Regeneration Technologies, of Florida. Overall, about 10,000 patients in the United States and Canada received graft tissue from BTS.

BTS was not an accredited member, nor did the company ever apply to be a member, of the American Association of Tissue Banks. Robert Rigney, who heads the association, said he doubts anyone who received tissue donations originating from the company is in any kind of health danger, because the processors the company dealt with would have subjected the tissues to their own screening processes.

However, transplant patient Betty Pfaff was one person who suffered severe infection, septic shock, underwent dialysis and ultimately paralysis due to having received an implant made from infected cadaver tissue from Mastromarino's company. Although a recent judicial ruling has increased the difficulty of patients in proving pain and suffering from receiving bad donor tissue in cases like these, Pfaff's lawsuit is still pending.

Other patients who received BTS-derived tissue and body parts include a Colorado woman who had to repeat her ACL replacement surgery after her first BTS tendon failed, an Ohio woman who developed syphilis after receiving a bone from BTS, and an Ohio man who developed both HIV and hepatitis C after receiving BTS bone implants in surgery.

On January 8, 2010, Michael Mastromarino's now ex-wife Barbra Mastromarino appeared on The Oprah Winfrey Show in a segment "Husbands' Secret Lives" and discussed the effect of the actions on her life and their sons' lives. After confronting his father about the reasons for his crimes while Dr. Mastromarino was incarcerated at Rikers Island, their older son subsequently refused to speak to his father. During the broadcast, Barbra Mastromarino also listened to and apologized to the daughter of a victim of her husband's crimes, while mentioning she had no knowledge of her husband's illegal acts. Barbra Mastromarino acknowledged ignoring warning signs about the character of her ex-husband early in their relationship.

On the morning of July 7, 2013, Michael Mastromarino died at St. Luke's Hospital after suffering from bone cancer. He was 49.

== In popular culture ==
- Story is used in CSI: Crime Scene Investigation (Season 7, Episode 14: "Meet Market") in February, 2007.
- The case was the subject of the documentary Bodysnatchers of New York (2010) by Toby Dye
- Featured in an episode of Who the (Bleep) Did I Marry? (Michael Mastromarino's wife)
- Featured in an episode of Love, Honor, Betray (Under Your Skin)

== See also ==
- Organ harvesting
- Body snatching
- Tri-State Crematory
