= Harvard morgue case =

Body snatching and organ trafficking scandal

In June 2023, Cedric Lodge, his wife and three other individuals were indicted for conspiracy and interstate transport of stolen goods. Lodge, a morgue manager at Harvard Medical School, had access to bodies willed by their owners for academic research. While working at the school, he allegedly sold human body parts on the internet.

== Harvard Medical School incident ==
Lodge worked as the morgue manager under the Anatomical Gift Program at Harvard Medical School from 1995 until his firing on May 6, 2023. The U.S. Attorney's Office for the Middle District of Pennsylvania accused him of conspiracy and interstate transport of stolen goods. From roughly 2018 to 2022, Lodge allegedly delivered human remains by post to customers, who sometimes visited the morgue to choose their preferred body parts. While selling services associated with the cost of procuring cadavers is not illegal in the United States, selling bodies or body parts is.

The parts stolen and sold included heads, brains, skin, bones, vital organs and other human parts. Other reports state that the operation allegedly sold stillborn babies due for cremation. One of the indicted buyers had posted a photo of a real human skull on Instagram and another had purchased skin with the intent to make leather.

On June 14, 2023, Cedric and four others, including his wife, were indicted by a grand jury on allegations of theft and sale of body parts. The charges included conspiracy and interstate transport of stolen goods. The case is USA v. Lodge, 23-cr-00159, in the United States District Court for the Middle District of Pennsylvania.

Later the same month, families of anatomical donors whose remains were allegedly stolen from Harvard Medical School filed civil lawsuits against Harvard University and the medical school in Suffolk Superior Court. The actions were brought by the law firm Morgan & Morgan on behalf of multiple families and were later consolidated into a class action. The complaints alleged negligence and breach of duty in Harvard’s handling and oversight of donated remains under its Anatomical Gift Program.

On September 8, 2023 Jeremy Pauley, one of Lodge's purchasers, pleaded guilty to his charges and admitted to his role in a nationwide network buying and selling human remains stolen from Harvard Medical School and an Arkansas mortuary. He was sentenced to two years probation.

The public court case docket shows that Lodge and co-defendants are scheduled for trial no earlier than April 2024.

FBI investigators found that Jeremy Pauley also purchased body parts from a woman named Candace Chapman Scott, 37, of Little Rock, Arkansas, after meeting Scott in a Facebook group. Scott admitted to stealing remains from an Arkansas crematorium where she was employed and selling them, she sold multiple brains, an arm, an ear, multiple lungs, multiple hearts, multiple breasts, a belly button, testicles, and other parts. During a search warrant executed at Scott’s Little Rock home, FBI investigators found numerous stolen body parts that she admitted she transported in trash bags from her work. Scott received a total of $10,625 from Pauley in Pennsylvania for the human remains. Scott was indicted in the United States District Court for the Eastern District of Arkansas on charges of theft, transporting stolen human body parts —including fetuses— and conspiracy to commit mail fraud, she pled guilty and was sentenced to 15 years in federal prison on January 16, 2025. On February 20, 2025, Cedric Lodge retained PK Law Group and Attorney Patrick Rahilly to handle the civil aspect of the case in Suffolk Superior Court.

In February 2024, a Massachusetts Superior Court judge dismissed the claims against Harvard, citing statutory immunity under the Uniform Anatomical Gift Act, while allowing claims against non-Harvard defendants to proceed. Attorneys for the plaintiffs, including representatives of Morgan & Morgan, said they would appeal the ruling.

On May 22, 2025 the U.S. Attorney for the Middle District of Pennsylvania's Office announced that Cedric Lodge, and his wife Denise, had both pled guilty in the United States District Court for the Middle District of Pennsylvania to charges of interstate transport of stolen human remains. They faced a maximum of 10 years in prison and a fine of up to $250,000. On December 16, 2025, Cedric Lodge was sentenced to 96 months (8 years) in prison and Denise Lodge was sentenced to 12 months and a day in prison for assisting.

In October 2025, on appeal, the Supreme Judicial Court of Massachusetts ruled that the lawsuits against Harvard could proceed, finding that the allegations plausibly described a lack of good faith in oversight of the Anatomical Gift Program.

== Reactions ==
=== Harvard ===
In a memo titled 'An abhorrent betrayal' by the Dean of the Faculty of Medicine, George Q. Daley, Harvard condemned the crime as a ‘betrayal’ to the school and donors. Harvard also disclosed that Lodge acted “without the knowledge or permission of HMS”. Lodge was fired. Harvard appointed an external panel to evaluate their anatomical donor program and their morgue policies.

=== Donors ===
Paula Peltonovich and her sister Darlene Lynch were children to police officer parents who had willed their bodies to science. On getting the news that the remains of their father, who died in 2019, were among those reported stolen, they requested the withdrawal of their mother's body, who died in March 2023, from the school.
