= 2005 California Proposition 73 =

Proposition 73
- Waiting Period/Parental Notification

Results
Choice	Votes	%
Yes	3,676,592	47.22%
No	4,109,430	52.78%
Valid votes	7,786,022	97.71%
Invalid or blank votes	182,735	2.29%
Total votes	7,968,757	100.00%
Registered voters/turnout	15,891,482	50.14%
County results
For
60%–70%
50%–60%
Against
70%–80%
60%–70%
50%–60%
Tie
50%

Proposition 73, the Parental Notification Initiative, would have amended the California Constitution to bar abortion on an unemancipated minor until 48 hours after physician notifies minor's parent/legal guardian, except in medical emergency or with parental waiver. The amendment permitted a judicial waiver of notice based on clear and convincing evidence of the minor's maturity or best interests. The minor's physician must report abortions performed on minors and State shall compile statistics. The amendment authorized monetary damages for violation. The minor must consent to abortion unless mentally incapable or in medical emergency. Permits judicial relief if minor's consent to abortion is coerced.

== State official summary ==
Proposition 73: Termination of Minor's Pregnancy. Waiting Period and Parental Notification. Initiative Constitutional Amendment.

=== Ballot Summary ===
Amends California Constitution to bar abortion on unemancipated minor until 48 hours after physician notifies minor's parent/legal guardian, except in medical emergency or with parental waiver. However, the abortion can still be enacted by the minor with or without the parent's approval after the parents have been notified. Permits judicial waiver of notice based on clear and convincing evidence of minor's maturity or minor's best interests. Physician must report abortions performed on minors and State shall compile statistics. Authorizes monetary damages for violation. Minor must consent to abortion unless mentally incapable or in medical emergency. Permits judicial relief if minor's consent to abortion is coerced. Summary of estimate by Legislative Analyst and Director of Finance of fiscal impact on state and local governments: The net costs of this measure to Medi-Cal and other programs are unknown, but are probably not significant in the context of the total expenditures for these programs.

== Results ==
Did not pass

- Yes: 3,676,592 (47.2%)
- No: 4,109,430 (52.8%)

== Endorsements ==
=== Video endorsements ===
- Patrick Warburton
- James Caviezel

=== Radio spots ===
- Patricia Heaton
- Dr. Laura Schlessinger
- Ben Stein
- Laura Ingraham
- Robert Davi

=== Newspapers ===
- Jim Holman, owner, San Diego Reader
