= Elections in California =

United States presidential election results for California
Year	Republican / Whig		Democratic		Third party(ies)	
Year	No.	%	No.	%	No.	%
1852	35,972	46.83%	40,721	53.02%	117	0.15%
1856	20,704	18.78%	53,342	48.38%	36,209	32.84%
1860	38,733	32.32%	37,999	31.71%	43,095	35.96%
1864	62,053	58.60%	43,837	41.40%	0	0.00%
1868	54,588	50.24%	54,068	49.76%	0	0.00%
1872	54,007	56.38%	40,717	42.51%	1,061	1.11%
1876	79,258	50.88%	76,460	49.08%	66	0.04%
1880	80,282	48.89%	80,426	48.98%	3,510	2.14%
1884	102,369	51.97%	89,288	45.33%	5,331	2.71%
1888	124,816	49.66%	117,729	46.84%	8,794	3.50%
1892	118,027	43.78%	118,174	43.83%	33,408	12.39%
1896	146,688	49.16%	144,766	48.51%	6,965	2.33%
1900	164,755	54.37%	124,985	41.25%	13,264	4.38%
1904	205,226	61.84%	89,404	26.94%	37,248	11.22%
1908	214,398	55.46%	127,492	32.98%	44,707	11.56%
1912	3,914	0.58%	283,436	41.81%	390,594	57.61%
1916	462,516	46.27%	466,289	46.65%	70,798	7.08%
1920	624,992	66.20%	229,191	24.28%	89,867	9.52%
1924	733,250	57.20%	105,514	8.23%	443,136	34.57%
1928	1,162,323	64.69%	614,365	34.19%	19,968	1.11%
1932	847,902	37.39%	1,324,157	58.39%	95,907	4.23%
1936	836,431	31.70%	1,766,836	66.95%	35,615	1.35%
1940	1,351,419	41.34%	1,877,618	57.44%	39,754	1.22%
1944	1,512,965	42.97%	1,988,564	56.48%	19,346	0.55%
1948	1,895,269	47.13%	1,913,134	47.57%	213,135	5.30%
1952	2,897,310	56.35%	2,197,548	42.74%	46,991	0.91%
1956	3,027,668	55.39%	2,420,135	44.27%	18,552	0.34%
1960	3,259,722	50.10%	3,224,099	49.55%	22,757	0.35%
1964	2,879,108	40.79%	4,171,877	59.11%	6,601	0.09%
1968	3,467,664	47.82%	3,244,318	44.74%	539,605	7.44%
1972	4,602,096	55.00%	3,475,847	41.54%	289,919	3.46%
1976	3,882,244	49.35%	3,742,284	47.57%	242,589	3.08%
1980	4,524,858	52.69%	3,083,661	35.91%	978,544	11.40%
1984	5,467,009	57.51%	3,922,519	41.27%	115,895	1.22%
1988	5,054,917	51.13%	4,702,233	47.56%	129,914	1.31%
1992	3,630,574	32.61%	5,121,325	46.01%	2,379,822	21.38%
1996	3,828,380	38.21%	5,119,835	51.10%	1,071,269	10.69%
2000	4,567,429	41.65%	5,861,203	53.45%	537,224	4.90%
2004	5,509,826	44.36%	6,745,485	54.31%	166,042	1.34%
2008	5,011,781	36.95%	8,274,473	61.01%	275,646	2.03%
2012	4,839,958	37.12%	7,854,285	60.24%	344,304	2.64%
2016	4,483,810	31.62%	8,753,788	61.73%	943,997	6.66%
2020	6,006,429	34.32%	11,110,250	63.48%	384,202	2.20%
2024	6,081,697	38.33%	9,276,179	58.47%	507,599	3.20%

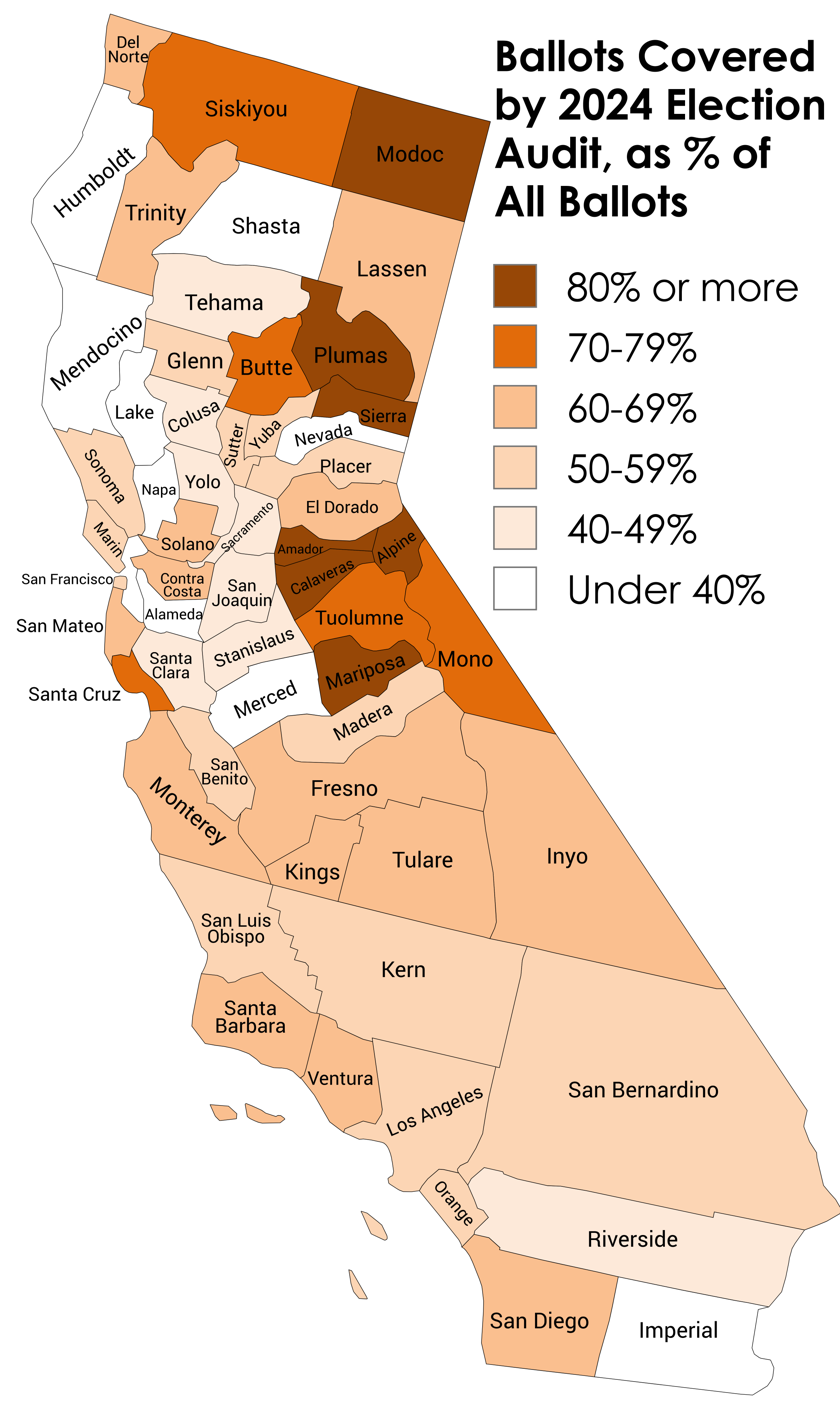
Audit only covers ballots counted through election night

Elections in California are held to fill various local, state and federal seats. In California, regular elections are held every even year (such as 2006 and 2008); however, some seats have terms of office that are longer than two years, so not every seat is on the ballot in every election. Special elections may be held to fill vacancies at other points in time. Recall elections can also be held. Additionally, statewide initiatives, legislative referrals and referendums may be on the ballot.

In a 2022 study, California was ranked as the 6th easiest state for citizens to vote in.

== Elected offices ==
=== Federal ===
As with every other state in the United States, California participates in federal elections including electing representatives to the House of Representatives, and senators to the Senate. Additionally, the state casts 54 votes in the Electoral College during presidential elections.

==== President ====
Every four years, the United States holds a national indirect election for president and vice president of the United States. In such elections, voters cast their votes for a slate of representatives (electors) who have pledged to cast their votes for a particular presidential and vice presidential candidate (a ticket) in the Electoral College. During the election, the voters of the state select the slate of electors on the ballot by voting for the ticket that they are pledged to. The slate of electors pledged to the ticket with the most votes statewide gets to vote in the Electoral College. Although, the electors are not obligated to vote for the candidates they are pledged to, they usually do. The number of electors the state is allocated is equal to the number of representatives in Congress that the state has (the members in the House of Representatives, plus the two senators).

==== Senate ====
California, like all other states in the United States, is represented in the United States Senate by two senators. In addition to representatives in the House of Representatives, California's senators represent the state's constituents in Congress. Alex Padilla and Adam Schiff currently serve as the state's senators. Each senator is elected to serve a six-year term with Padilla having last been elected in 2022 and Schiff in 2024. After Kamala Harris was elected as Vice President in 2020, Padilla was appointed to serve the remainder of her term. Each U.S. senator is elected in a statewide election following earlier open primary elections typically held in the first week of June. There is no limit to the number of terms that a senator may serve so long as they continue to be elected to the position via statewide vote.

==== House of Representatives ====
Similarly, California is also represented in the US Congress by fifty-two members of Congress representing the fifty-two congressional districts in the state. As in all other states, these congressional districts are reapportioned every ten years following the release of a new census. Due to its status as the most populous state in the union, California has the largest number of representatives of any single state in Congress. These representatives are elected for two-year terms as per the rules of the House of Representatives and currently feature a number of prominent members of the body such as former Speaker of the House Kevin McCarthy.

=== State ===
California has a gubernatorial election every four years, and in 2003 and 2021, gubernatorial recall elections were held. Primary elections were held in March or June until 2008, when they were held in February. General elections, which cover statewide issues, continue to be held in November. On a county-by-county basis, elections also cover electing municipal leaders. In addition, a special election can occur at any time.

==== State Senate ====
Due to a combination of the state's large population and a legislature that has not been expanded since the ratification of the 1879 Constitution, the State Senate has the largest population per state senator ratio of any state legislative house. Members of the State Senate serve four-year terms. Every two years, half of the Senate's 40 seats are subject to election.

==== State Assembly ====
The lower house of the California State Legislature is the "California State Assembly". Every two years, all 80 seats in the Assembly are subject to election. Members elected to the Assembly prior to 2012 are restricted by term limits to three two-year terms (six years), while those elected in or after 2012 are allowed to serve 12 years in the legislature in any combination of four-year State Senate or two-year State Assembly terms.

=== Local ===
In addition, many if not most of California's county, city, school district, community college district, health care district, municipal utility district, transit district and other special district officers are elected. Per the California Secretary of State website, "political parties are not entitled to nominate candidates for nonpartisan offices at the primary election, and a candidate at the primary election is not the official nominee of any party for the specific office at the general election. [However, parties may endorse candidates.] A candidate for nomination to a nonpartisan office may not designate his or her party preference, or lack of party preference, on the ballot."

Effective January 1, 2018, all of California's cities, K-12 school districts, community college districts and special districts will have to move their election dates to a statewide election (primary or general) held during an even-numbered year due to the passage of Senate Bill 415 (California Voter Participation Rights Act), which was approved by the California Senate and Assembly and signed by the Governor in 2015. The 2018 elections will be held on June 5 (primary) and November 6 (general). Starting in 2020, the presidential primary will move to March which also include the U.S. House of Representatives, California State Senate and Assembly and County Boards of Supervisors. U.S. Senate primary in California will take place in March 2022. Los Angeles City Council and School Board will have its primary election in March and its runoff election in November beginning in 2020, due to the passage of Charter Amendments 1 and 2 during the 2015 elections.

== Voting rights and voter powers ==
Voting rights in California

Demographics
- Poll taxes: Abolished 1914
- Literacy tests abolished: N/A
- Minimum voting age: 18
- Preregistration age: 16
- Felon voting status: Allowed to vote upon release

Voter registration
- Voter registration required: Yes
- Online voter registration: Yes
- Automatic voter registration: Yes
- Same-day registration: Yes
- Partisan affiliation: Yes

Voting process
- Free elections requirement: Yes
- Polling place identification requirements: Not required
- In-person early-voting status: 29 days prior up to the day before
- Out-of-precinct voting status: N/A
- Postal ballot status: No-excuse required
- Permanent list postal ballot status: any voter
- Ballot collection status: any trusted person
- Straight-ticket device status: No
- Election method: Top-two voting via nonpartisan blanket primary
- Means of casting in-person ballots: All-mail voting; hand-marked paper ballots and ballot-marking devices on Election Day

Voter powers
- Redistricting system: Independent non-partisan redistricting commission
- Prison-based redistricting: No
- Ballot question rights: Initiative and referendum for both statute and constitutional amendment
- Recall powers: For all offices
- Federal representation level: State-level

=== Procedure ===
Pursuant to Proposition 14 (2010), California uses a nonpartisan blanket primary for "voter-nominated" offices, which include:

- United States Senators,
- United States Representatives,
- State Senators,
- State Assembly members,
- the Governor,
- the Lieutenant Governor,
- the State Treasurer,
- the State Controller,
- the State Insurance Commissioner,
- the State Superintendent of Public Instruction (nonpartisan),
- the Secretary of State,
- and the State Attorney General.

In this system voters may vote for any candidate in the primary and the top two candidates who receive the most votes advance to the general election. Elections for president, vice president, political party state central committees, and county central committees are "party-nominated".

Candidates may qualify in one of two ways: by payment of a fee, or by the collection of registered voters' signatures on an in-lieu-of-filing-fee petition. Candidates must also file a "candidate intention statement" with the Secretary of State, as well as nomination forms with their home county.

=== Ballot propositions ===
A ballot proposition is a proposed law that is submitted to the electorate for approval in a direct vote (or plebiscite). It may take the form of a constitutional amendment or an ordinary statute. A ballot proposition may be proposed by the State Legislature or by a petition signed by members of the public under the initiative system. In California a vote on a measure referred to voters by the legislature is a mandatory referendum; a vote to veto a law that has already been adopted by the legislature is an optional referendum or "people's veto"; the process of proposing laws by petition is the initiative.

== Political parties ==
There are six qualified political parties:

- American Independent Party
- California Democratic Party (see also Democratic Party)
- Green Party of California (see also Green Party)
- Libertarian Party of California (see also Libertarian Party)
- Peace and Freedom Party
- California Republican Party (see also Republican Party)

Political bodies attempting to qualify as a political party include:

- American Solidarity Party
- Common Sense Party of California
- Constitution Party of California
- Forward Party

Only the Democratic Party and Republican Party currently have representation in the State Legislature. However, Audie Bock, a member of the Green Party, was elected in 1999 during the 1998–99 California special elections.

Local elections in California at the county and city level are officially non-partisan and political party affiliations are not included on local election ballots.

== See also ==
- 2026 California elections
- 1934 California gubernatorial election
- California's congressional delegations
- Electoral history of Jerry Brown
- Electoral history of Gavin Newsom
- Electoral history of Ronald Reagan
- Elections in the United States
- Electoral reform in California
- Government of California
- List of California ballot propositions
- List of governors of California
- Political party strength in California
- Politics of California
- Women's suffrage in California

== Bibliography ==
- California Secretary of State - On-Line Lists of Candidates
- JoinCalifornia - California Election Statistics
