= Electoral history of Jerry Brown =

Elections featuring Governor of California

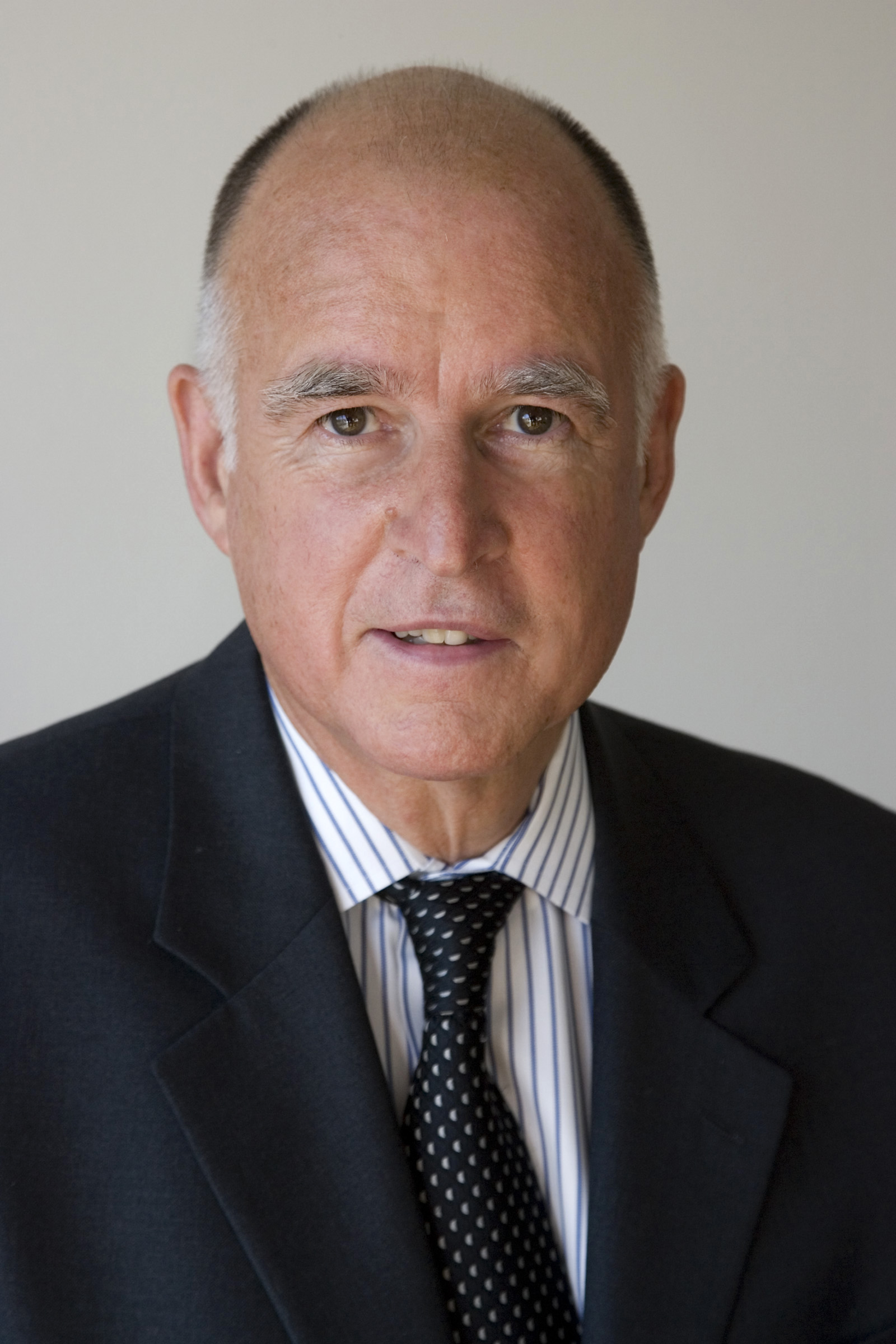
Governor Jerry Brown

The electoral history of Jerry Brown, California Governor (1975–1983, 2011–2019), Secretary of State (1971–1975), Attorney General (2007–2011); and Mayor of Oakland (1999–2007).

== Secretary of state ==
California Secretary of State election, 1970
Primary election
Party	Candidate	Votes	%
Democratic	Jerry Brown	1,632,886	67.70
Democratic	Hugh M. Burns	591,320	24.52
Democratic	Jimmy Campbell	187,899	7.79
Total votes		2,412,105	100%
General election
Democratic	Jerry Brown	3,234,788	50.41
Republican	James L. Flournoy	2,926,613	45.61
American Independent	Thomas M. Goodloe, Jr.	144,838	2.26
Peace and Freedom	Israel Feuer	110,184	1.72
Total votes		6,416,423	100%

== Governor ==
=== 1974 ===
California Governor election, 1974
Primary election
Party	Candidate	Votes	%
Democratic	Jerry Brown	1,085,752	37.75
Democratic	Joseph L. Alioto	544,007	18.92
Democratic	Bob Moretti	478,469	16.64
Democratic	William M. Roth	293,686	10.21
Democratic	Jerome L. Waldie	277,489	7.91
Democratic	Baxter Ward	79,745	2.77
Democratic	Herbert Hafif	77,505	2.70
Democratic	Alex D. Aloia	18,400	0.64
Democratic	Conie R. Robertson	13,493	0.47
Democratic	Robert H. Wagner	8,955	0.31
Democratic	Jim Wedworth	7,973	0.28
Democratic	Joe Brouillette	7,906	0.28
Democratic	John Hancock Abbott	6,921	0.24
Democratic	Joseph S. Ramos	6,721	0.23
Democratic	Eileen Anderson	6,666	0.23
Democratic	Ray Chote	6,113	0.21
Democratic	Chris Musun	3,495	0.12
Democratic	Russ Priebe	1,427	0.05
Write-in		1,349	0.05
Total votes		2,926,072	100%
General election
Democratic	Jerry Brown	3,131,648	50.12
Republican	Houston I. Flournoy	2,952,954	47.26
American Independent	Edmon V. Kaiser	83,869	1.34
Peace and Freedom	Elizabeth Keathley	75,004	1.20
Write-in		4,595	0.07
Total votes		6,248,070	100%

=== 1978 ===
California Governor election, 1978
Primary election
Party	Candidate	Votes	%
Democratic	Jerry Brown (incumbent)	2,567,067	77.53
Democratic	David Rock	132,706	4.01
Democratic	John Hancock Abbott	127,506	3.85
Democratic	George B. Roden	125,790	3.80
Democratic	Jules Kimmett	83,339	2.52
Democratic	Gene Atherton	80,224	2.42
Democratic	Alex D. Aloia	67,892	2.05
Democratic	Raymond V. Liebenberg	65,219	1.97
Democratic	Lowell Barling	60,997	1.84
Write-in		178	0.01
Total votes		3,310,918	100%
General election
Democratic	Jerry Brown (incumbent)	3,878,812	56.03
Republican	Evelle J. Younger	2,526,534	36.50
Libertarian	Ed Clark	377,960	5.46
Peace and Freedom	Marilyn Seals	70,864	1.02
American Independent	Theresa F. Dietrich	67,103	0.97
Write-in		1,040	0.02
Total votes		6,922,313	100%

=== 2010 ===
California Governor election, 2010
Primary election
Party	Candidate	Votes	%
Democratic	Jerry Brown	2,021,189	84.38
Democratic	Richard Aguirre	95,596	3.99
Democratic	Chuck Pineda, Jr.	94,669	3.95
Democratic	Vibert Greene	54,225	2.26
Democratic	Joe Symmon	54,122	2.26
Democratic	Lowell Darling	39,930	1.67
Democratic	Peter Schurman	35,450	1.48
Write-in		106	0.00
Total votes		2,395,287	100%
General election
Democratic	Jerry Brown	5,428,149	53.77
Republican	Meg Whitman	4,127,391	40.89
American Independent	Chelene Nightingale	166,312	1.65
Libertarian	Dale F. Ogden	150,895	1.50
Green	Laura Wells	129,224	1.28
Peace and Freedom	Carlos Alvarez	92,851	0.92
Write-in		363	0.00
Total votes		10,095,185	100%

=== 2014 ===
California Governor election, 2014
Primary election
Party	Candidate	Votes	%
Democratic	Jerry Brown (incumbent)	2,354,769	54.35
Republican	Neel Kashkari	839,767	19.38
Republican	Tim Donnelly	643,236	14.85
Republican	Andrew Blount	89,749	2.07
Republican	Glenn Champ	76,066	1.76
Green	Luis J. Rodriguez	66,872	1.54
Peace and Freedom	Cindy Sheehan	52,707	1.22
Republican	Alma Marie Winston	46,042	1.06
No party preference	Robert C. Newman II	44,120	1.02
Democratic	Akinyemi Agbede	37,024	0.85
Republican	Richard Aguirre	35,125	0.81
No party preference	"Bo" Bogdan Ambrozewicz	14,929	0.35
No party preference	Janel Hyeshia Buycks	12,136	0.28
No party preference	Rakesh Kumar Christian	11,142	0.26
Total votes		4,247,618	100%
General election
Democratic	Jerry Brown (incumbent)	4,388,368	59.97
Republican	Neel Kashkari	2,929,213	40.03
Total votes		7,317,581	100%

== Democratic presidential nominee ==
=== 1976 ===
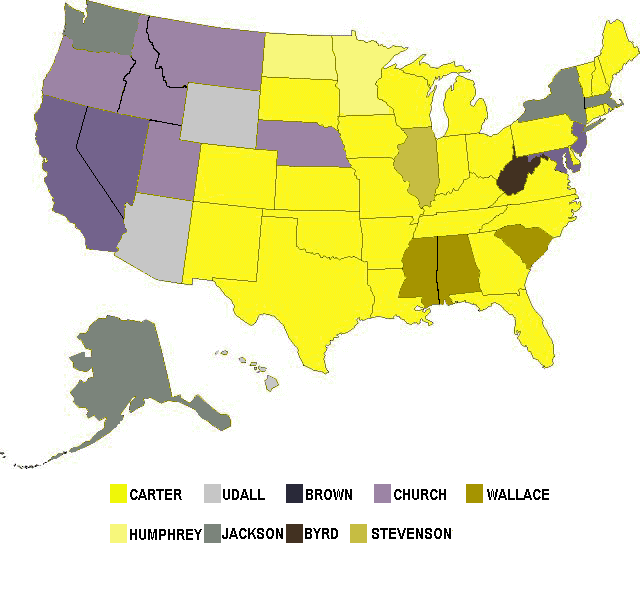
1976 Democratic presidential primary by state results

Democratic Party presidential primaries, 1976
Party	Candidate	Votes	%
Democratic	Jimmy Carter	6,235,609	39.19
Democratic	Jerry Brown	2,449,374	15.39
Democratic	George Wallace	1,955,388	12.29
Democratic	Morris K. Udall	1,611,754	10.13
Democratic	Henry M. Jackson	1,134,375	7.13
Democratic	Frank Church	830,818	5.22
Democratic	Robert Byrd	340,309	2.14
Democratic	Sargent Shriver	304,399	1.91
Democratic	Unpledged delegates	283,437	1.78
Democratic	Ellen McCormack	238,027	1.50
Democratic	Fred R. Harris	234,568	1.47
Democratic	Milton Shapp	88,254	0.56
Democratic	Birch Bayh	86,438	0.54
Democratic	Others	118,627	0.75
Total votes		15,911,377	100%

1976 Democratic National Convention presidential tally
Party	Candidate	Votes	%
Democratic	Jimmy Carter	2,239	74.48
Democratic	Morris K. Udall	330	10.98
Democratic	Jerry Brown	301	10.01
Democratic	George Wallace	57	1.90
Democratic	Ellen McCormack	22	0.73
Democratic	Frank Church	19	0.63
Democratic	Hubert Humphrey	10	0.33
Democratic	Henry M. Jackson	10	0.33
Democratic	Fred R. Harris	9	0.30
Democratic	Milton Shapp	2	0.07
Democratic	Robert Byrd	1	0.03
Democratic	Cesar Chavez	1	0.03
Democratic	Leon Jaworski	1	0.03
Democratic	Barbara Jordan	1	0.03
Democratic	Ted Kennedy	1	0.03
Democratic	Jennings Randolph	1	0.03
Democratic	Fred Stover	1	0.03
Total votes		3,006	100%

=== 1980 ===
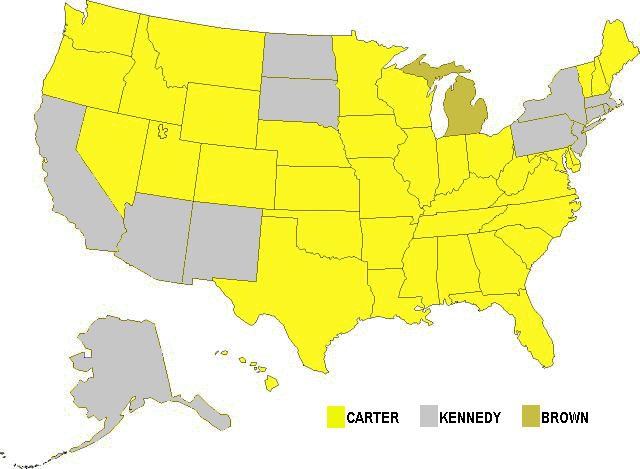
1980 Democratic presidential primaries by state results

Democratic Party presidential primaries, 1980
Party	Candidate	Votes	%
Democratic	Jimmy Carter (incumbent)	10,043,016	51.11
Democratic	Ted Kennedy	7,381,693	37.57
Democratic	Unpledged delegates	1,288,423	6.56
Democratic	Jerry Brown	575,296	2.93
Democratic	Lyndon LaRouche	177,784	0.91
Democratic	Richard B. Kay	48,061	0.24
Democratic	Cliff Finch	48,032	0.24
Democratic	Others	87,153	0.44
Total votes		19,649,458	100%

1980 Democratic National Convention presidential tally
Party	Candidate	Votes	%
Democratic	Jimmy Carter (incumbent)	2,123	64.04
Democratic	Ted Kennedy	1,151	34.72
Democratic	William Proxmire	10	0.30
Democratic	Koryne Kaneski Horbal	5	0.15
Democratic	Scott M. Matheson, Sr.	5	0.15
Democratic	Ron Dellums	3	0.09
Democratic	Robert Byrd	2	0.06
Democratic	John Culver	2	0.06
Democratic	Kent Hance	2	0.06
Democratic	Jennings Randolph	2	0.06
Democratic	Alice Tripp	2	0.06
Democratic	Warren Spannaus	2	0.06
Democratic	Jerry Brown	1	0.03
Democratic	Dale Bumpers	1	0.03
Democratic	Hugh L. Carey	1	0.03
Democratic	Edmund S. Muskie	1	0.03
Democratic	Thomas J. Steed	1	0.03
Democratic	Walter Mondale	1	0.03
Total votes		3,315	100%

=== 1992 ===
1992 Democratic presidential primaries by state results

1992 Democratic National Convention presidential tally
Party	Candidate	Votes	%
Democratic	Bill Clinton	10,482,411	51.98
Democratic	Jerry Brown	4,071,232	20.19
Democratic	Paul Tsongas	3,656,010	18.13
Democratic	Unpledged delegates	750,873	3.72
Democratic	Bob Kerrey	318,457	1.58
Democratic	Tom Harkin	280,304	1.39
Democratic	Lyndon LaRouche, Jr.	154,599	0.77
Democratic	Eugene McCarthy	108,678	0.54
Democratic	Others	342,605	1.70
Total votes		20,165,169	100%

1992 Democratic National Convention presidential tally
Party	Candidate	Votes	%
Democratic	Bill Clinton	3,372	80.27
Democratic	Jerry Brown	596	14.19
Democratic	Paul Tsongas	209	4.98
Democratic	Robert P. Casey	10	0.24
Democratic	Patricia Schroeder	8	0.19
Democratic	Larry Agran	3	0.07
Democratic	Ron Daniels	1	0.02
Democratic	Al Gore	1	0.02
Democratic	Joe Simonetta	1	0.02
Total votes		4,201	100%

== Democratic vice presidential nominee ==
1980 Democratic National Convention vice presidential tally
Party	Candidate	Votes	%
Democratic	Walter Mondale (incumbent)	2,429	72.90
Democratic	Abstaining	728	21.85
Democratic	Melvin Boozer	48	1.44
Democratic	Ed Rendell	28	0.84
Democratic	Roberto Mondragón	19	0.57
Democratic	Patricia Stone Simon	11	0.33
Democratic	Tom Daschle	10	0.30
Democratic	Ted Kulongoski	8	0.24
Democratic	Shirley Chisholm	6	0.18
Democratic	Terry Chisholm	6	0.18
Democratic	Barbara Jordan	4	0.12
Democratic	Rick Nolan	4	0.12
Democratic	Patrick Lucey	3	0.09
Democratic	Jerry Brown	2	0.06
Democratic	George McGovern	2	0.06
Democratic	Eric Tovar	2	0.06
Democratic	Mo Udall	2	0.06
Democratic	Others	20	0.60
Total votes		3,332	100%

== US Senate ==
US Senate election in California, 1982
Primary election
Party	Candidate	Votes	%
Democratic	Jerry Brown	1,392,660	50.67
Democratic	Gore Vidal	415,366	15.11
Democratic	Paul B. Carpenter	415,198	15.11
Democratic	Daniel K. Whitehurst	167,574	6.10
Democratic	Richard Morgan	94,908	3.45
Democratic	Tom Metzger	76,502	2.78
Democratic	Walter R. Buchanan	55,727	2.03
Democratic	Bob Hampton	37,427	1.36
Democratic	Raymond Caplette	31,865	1.16
Democratic	William F. Wertz	30,795	1.12
Democratic	May Chote	30,743	1.12
Write-in		10	0.00
Total votes		2,748,775	100%
General election
Republican	Pete Wilson	4,022,565	51.54
Democratic	Jerry Brown	3,494,968	44.78
Libertarian	Joseph Fuhrig	107,720	1.38
Peace and Freedom	David Wald	96,388	1.24
American Independent	Theresa F. Dietrich	83,809	1.07
Write-in		88	0.00
Total votes		7,805,538	100%

== Mayor ==
=== 1998 ===
Oakland mayoral election, 1998
Party	Candidate	Votes	%
Nonpartisan	Jerry Brown	48,129	58.93
Nonpartisan	Edward J. Blakely	12,226	14.97
Nonpartisan	Shannon F. Reeves	5,679	6.95
Nonpartisan	Ignacio De La Fuente	5,509	6.75
Nonpartisan	Mary V. King	4,618	5.65
Nonpartisan	Ces Butner	2,222	2.72
Nonpartisan	Audrey Rice Oliver	1,245	1.52
Nonpartisan	Leo Bazile	997	1.22
Nonpartisan	Hugh E. Bassette	518	0.63
Nonpartisan	Maria G. Harper	329	0.40
Nonpartisan	Hector Reyna	207	0.25
Total votes		81,679	100%

=== 2002 ===
Oakland mayoral election, 2002
Party	Candidate	Votes	%
Nonpartisan	Jerry Brown (incumbent)	42,892	63.54
Nonpartisan	Wilson Riles, Jr.	24,611	36.46
Total votes		67,503	100%

== Attorney general ==
Attorney General of California election, 2006
Primary election
Party	Candidate	Votes	%
Democratic	Jerry Brown	1,552,922	63.22
Democratic	Rocky Delgadillo	903,508	36.78
Total votes		2,456,430	100%
General election
Democratic	Jerry Brown	4,756,184	56.29
Republican	Charles Poochigian	3,220,429	38.11
Green	Michael Sutton Wyman	195,130	2.31
Libertarian	Kenneth A. Weissman	177,469	2.10
Peace and Freedom	Jack Harrison	100,797	1.19
Total votes		8,450,009	100%
