= Ken Cory =

American politician (1937–1998)

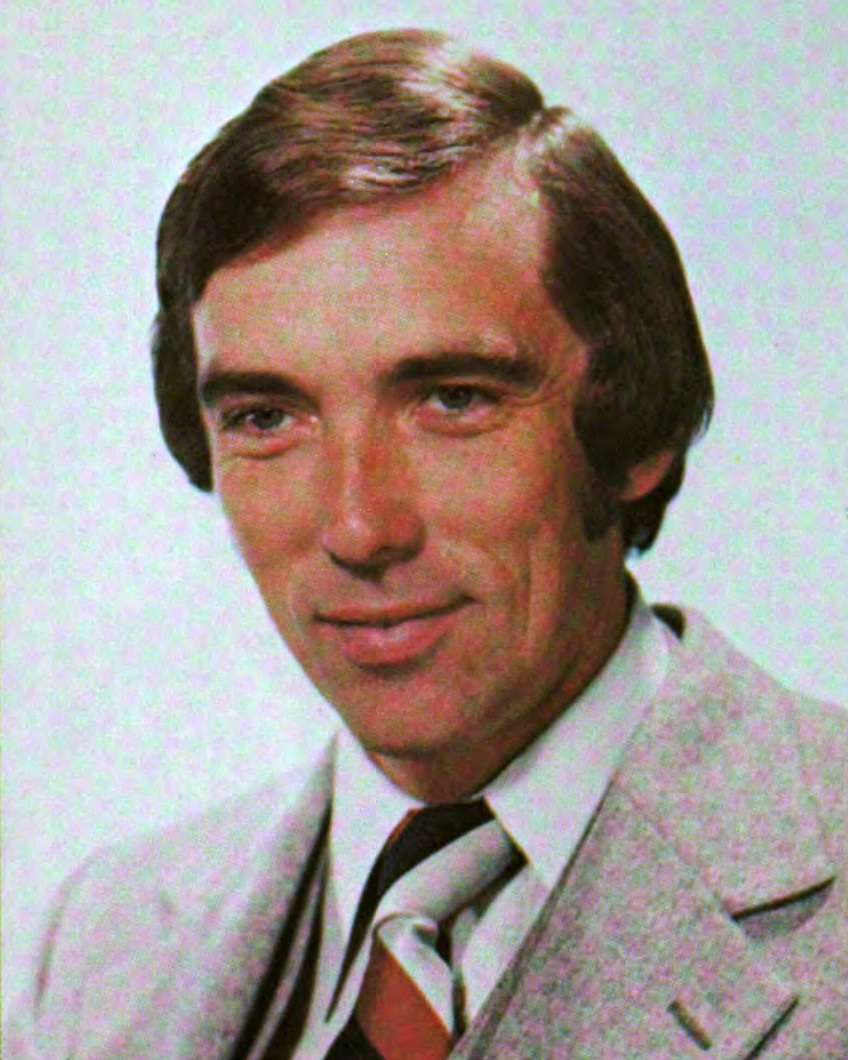
- Official portrait, 1975

27th California State Controller
- In office January 6, 1975 – January 5, 1987
- Governor: Jerry Brown
- Preceded by: Houston Flournoy
- Succeeded by: Gray Davis

Member of the California State Assembly from the 69th district
- In office January 2, 1967 – November 30, 1974
- Preceded by: William Dannemeyer
- Succeeded by: John Briggs

Personal details
- Born: James Kenneth Cory; September 29, 1937 Kansas City, Missouri, U.S.
- Died: November 13, 1998 (aged 61) Loomis, California, U.S.
- Spouse(s): Lucille Ann Des Jardins (divorced) Carole Lee Slicer (m. 1980)
- Children: 3

James Kenneth Cory (September 29, 1937 – November 13, 1998) was an American politician who served as the 27th California State Controller from 1975 until 1987. Prior to his term, he served in the California State Assembly from 1967 until 1975.

== Early life ==
James Kenneth Cory was born on September 29, 1937, in Kansas City, Missouri. He attended schools in nearby Leawood, Kansas before his family relocated to Long Beach, California, where he continued his education and also attended schools in Huntington Beach. After graduating from Huntington Beach High School, Cory pursued higher education at Orange Coast College, the University of California, Los Angeles, the University of California, Berkeley, and the University of Southern California, majoring in political science and engineering. He played basketball while attending Orange Coast College.

== Political career ==
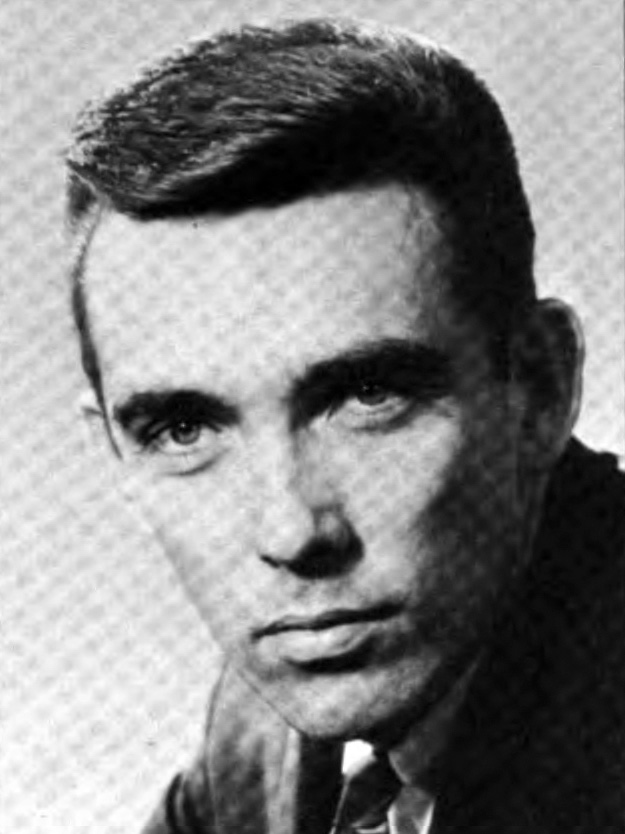
Cory during his first term in the California State Assembly, 1967.

Before his election to the California State Assembly, Cory served as Chief Administrative Officer of the Assembly and worked as a consultant to the Assembly Committee on Education under Richard T. Hanna. In 1966, he ran for the Assembly seat in the 69th district, winning the Democratic nomination against business executive Paul B. Carpenter. He faced Republican Stewart Case, a former administrative assistant to California State Senator John Murdy, and defeated him by 2,195 votes.

Cory was re-elected in 1968, narrowly defeating Republican Bruce Nestande, and defeated Nestande again in 1970 by a wider margin. He was re-elected for a final term in 1972, defeating Republican William Dannemeyer, who previous held the seat as a Democrat. While serving in the California State Assembly, Cory was a member of the Education, Revenue and Taxation, Elections and Reapportionment, and Ways and Means committees.

In 1974, Cory announced his candidacy for California State Controller after incumbent Republican Houston Flournoy decided to retire and run for Governor. He positioned himself as "the man oil companies fear the most", going against oil companies. In the Democratic primary, Cory defeated Robert H. Mendelsohn, a member of the San Francisco Board of Supervisors, by more than 300,000 votes. Cory defeated Republican Bill Bagley in the general election to become the 27th State Controller.

He was re-elected as State Controller in 1978 and 1982, and during his tenure, he was a popular figure with both Democrats and Republicans. However, he remained controversial for some of his decisions, receiving praise for pursuing legal action against banks that had written off dormant accounts but drew criticism after accepting a loan from supporters that included an individual later convicted of embezzlement and implicated in a 1982 Teachers Retirement System loan to a Colorado oil company. In 1986, Cory announced he would not seek re-election as State Controller, a decision that opened the way for Democrat Gray Davis to win the office and helped advance Davis's political career. After his term, he was involved in investments.

== Personal life ==
Cory married Carole Lee Slicer in 1980. He had previously lived in Westminster, California, with his first wife, Lucille Ann Des Jardins, from whom he later divorced; the couple had three children. After leaving Westminster, he moved to Garden Grove, California, and later relocated to Loomis, California, citing the noise from low-flying planes. Cory died on November 13, 1998, at his home in Loomis, California. He had been diagnosed with prostate cancer a year earlier and became involved in a national effort to raise funds for prostate cancer research.

Cory described himself as a moderate Democrat, with the Anaheim Bulletin characterizing his legislative record as verbally supportive of "liberal causes" while his votes often reflected a "conservative philosophy". He was 6 feet 7 inches tall, and claimed during his 1966 Assembly campaign that he was among the tallest candidates in the state that year.
