= 1974 California gubernatorial election =

- November 5, 1974
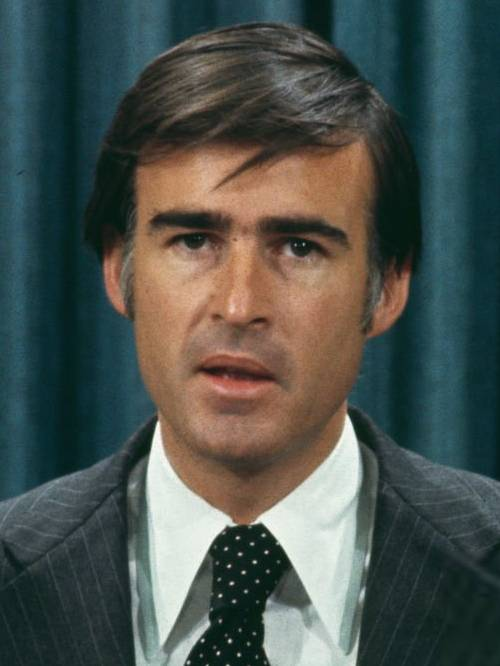

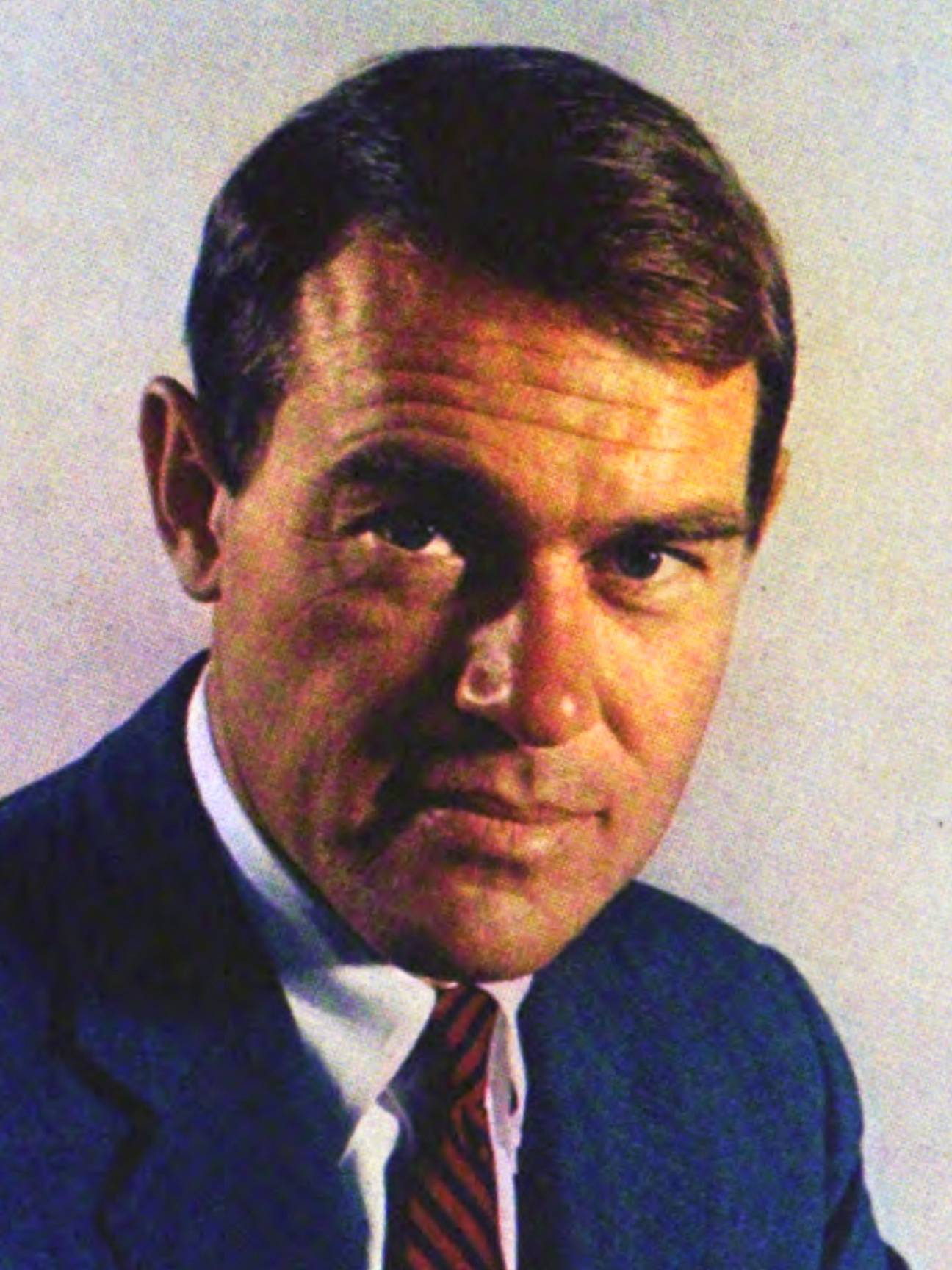
Nominee	Jerry Brown	Houston Flournoy
Party	Democratic	Republican
Popular vote	3,131,648	2,952,954
Percentage	50.11%	47.25%
- Brown: 40–50% 50–60% 60–70% 70–80% Flournoy: 40–50% 50–60% 60–70%
Governor before election
Ronald Reagan
Republican
Elected Governor
Jerry Brown
Democratic

The 1974 California gubernatorial election took place on November 5, 1974. Incumbent Governor Ronald Reagan retired after two terms. Jerry Brown, the secretary of state and son of former Governor Pat Brown, defeated Houston Flournoy.

Primary elections were held on June 4. Flournoy won the Republican primary over Lieutenant Governor Ed Reinecke. Brown won a plurality of the Democratic vote over a field of candidates that included San Francisco Mayor Joseph Alioto and Assembly Speaker Bob Moretti.

This was the first election since 1958 that did not feature either of the two future presidents Richard Nixon or Ronald Reagan as the Republican nominee, nor any incumbent governor. With Brown's election, California had a Democratic governor and two Democratic senators (John V. Tunney and Alan Cranston) for the first time since the Civil War.

As of 2026, this is the earliest California gubernatorial election to feature a major party candidate who is still alive.

== Republican primary ==
=== Candidates ===
- Houston Flournoy, California state controller
- Glenn Mitchel
- William Nelson
- Ed Reinecke, lieutenant governor of California
- J. F. Stay
- James Ware

=== Results ===
Republican primary results
Party	Candidate	Votes	%
Republican	Houston I. Flournoy	1,164,015	62.96%
Republican	Ed Reinecke	556,259	30.09%
Republican	James Ware	36,784	1.99%
Republican	Glenn Mitchel	31,518	1.70%
Republican	J. F. Stay	29,297	1.58%
Republican	William Nelson	22,597	1.22%
Republican	Scattering	8,355	0.45%
Total votes		1,848,825	100.00%

== Democratic primary ==
=== Candidates ===
- John Hancock Abbott
- Joseph Alioto, mayor of San Francisco
- Alex A. Aloia
- Eileen Anderson
- Joseph Francis Brouillette
- Jerry Brown, secretary of state of California and son of former Governor Pat Brown
- Herbert Hafif, Claremont personal injury attorney and restauranteur
- Bob Moretti, assemblyman from Van Nuys and speaker of the California State Assembly
- Chris Musun
- Russ Priebe
- Josephum S. Ramos
- Conie R. Robertson
- William M. Roth, former United States trade representative and regent of the University of California
- George Henry Wagner
- Jerome Waldie, U.S. representative from Antioch
- Baxter Ward, member of the Los Angeles County Board of Supervisors and candidate for mayor of Los Angeles in 1969
- Jim Wedworth

=== Results ===
Democratic primary results
Party	Candidate	Votes	%
Democratic	Jerry Brown	1,085,752	37.86%
Democratic	Joseph Alioto	544,007	18.97%
Democratic	Bob Moretti	478,469	16.68%
Democratic	William M. Roth	293,686	10.24%
Democratic	Jerome R. Waldie	227,489	7.93%
Democratic	Baxter Ward	79,745	2.78%
Democratic	Herbert Hafif	77,505	2.70%
Democratic	Alex A. Aloia	18,400	0.64%
Democratic	Conie R. Robertson	11,493	0.40%
Democratic	George Henry Wagner	8,955	0.31%
Democratic	Jim Wedworth	7,973	0.28%
Democratic	Joseph Francis Brouillette	7,906	0.28%
Democratic	John Hancock Abbott	6,961	0.24%
Democratic	Josephum S. Ramos	6,721	0.23%
Democratic	Eileen Anderson	6,666	0.23%
Democratic	Chris Musun	3,495	0.12%
Democratic	Russ Priebe	1,427	0.05%
Democratic	Scattering	1,349	0.05%
Total votes		2,867,999	100.00%

== Other primaries ==
=== American Independent Party ===
American Independent primary results
Party	Candidate	Votes	%
American Independent	Edmon V. Kasier	12,408	95.15%
American Independent	Scattering	633	4.85%
Total votes		13,041	100.00%

=== Peace and Freedom Party ===
Peace and Freedom primary results
Party	Candidate	Votes	%
Peace and Freedom	Elizabeth Keathley	2,111	28.06%
Peace and Freedom	Lester Higby	1,855	24.65%
Peace and Freedom	C. T. Weber	1,822	24.22%
Peace and Freedom	Trudy Saposhnek	1,417	18.83%
Peace and Freedom	Scattering	319	4.24%
Total votes		7,524	100.00%

== General election results ==
=== Candidates ===
- Jerry Brown, secretary of state of California and son of former Governor Pat Brown (Democratic)
- Houston Flournoy, California state controller (Republican)
- Edmon V. Kaiser (American Independent)
- Elizabeth Keathley (Peace and Freedom)

=== Campaign ===
Brown had statewide name recognition, benefited from the fact that Democrats outnumbered Republicans in California, and maintained a lead in most of the early polls. Flournoy began to gain in the polls as the election approached, but Brown won, although by a much smaller margin than predicted. Coincidentally, when Brown ran for Secretary of State four years earlier, he defeated James Flournoy – no relation to Houston – in a very close election.

=== Results ===
1974 California gubernatorial election
Party	Candidate	Votes	%	±%
Democratic	Jerry Brown	3,131,648	50.12%	+4.98%
Republican	Houston I. Flournoy	2,952,954	47.26%	−5.57%
American Independent	Edmon V. Kaiser	83,869	1.34%	+0.33%
Peace and Freedom	Elizabeth Keathley	75,004	1.20%	+0.19%
	Scattering	4,595	0.07%	
Majority		178,694	2.86%	
Total votes		6,248,070	100.00%	
Democratic gain from Republican		Swing	+10.56%	

=== Results by county ===
County	Jerry Brown Democratic		Houston I. Flournoy Republican		Edmon V. Kaiser American Independent		Elizabeth Keathley Peace & Freedom		Margin		Total votes cast (Note: County totals do not include the write-in votes, which are only given as statewide totals in the Statement of Vote.)
County	#	%	#	%	#	%	#	%	#	%	Total votes cast
Alameda	200,165	60.15%	123,656	37.16%	3,588	1.08%	5,341	1.61%	76,509	22.99%	332,750
Alpine	185	44.90%	212	51.46%	5	1.21%	10	2.43%	-27	-6.55%	412
Amador	3,198	46.48%	3,483	50.63%	141	2.05%	58	0.84%	-285	-4.14%	6,880
Butte	17,007	41.47%	22,499	54.86%	859	2.09%	643	1.57%	-5,492	-13.39%	41,008
Calaveras	2,702	41.25%	3,709	56.63%	87	1.33%	52	0.79%	-1,007	-15.37%	6,550
Colusa	1,884	42.16%	2,503	56.01%	54	1.21%	28	0.63%	-619	-13.85%	4,469
Contra Costa	97,038	48.31%	99,470	49.52%	2,372	1.18%	1,975	0.98%	-2,432	-1.21%	200,855
Del Norte	2,149	51.60%	1,921	46.12%	54	1.30%	41	0.98%	228	5.47%	4,165
El Dorado	8,076	46.09%	8,922	50.92%	342	1.95%	183	1.04%	-846	-4.83%	17,523
Fresno	61,596	52.41%	53,308	45.36%	1,337	1.14%	1,277	1.09%	8,288	7.05%	117,518
Glenn	2,645	40.86%	3,675	56.77%	115	1.78%	39	0.60%	-1,030	-15.91%	6,474
Humboldt	22,805	58.66%	14,958	38.48%	319	0.82%	792	2.04%	7,847	20.19%	38,875
Imperial	9,033	49.04%	9,011	48.92%	203	1.10%	171	0.93%	22	0.12%	18,418
Inyo	2,417	41.54%	3,238	55.65%	106	1.82%	58	1.00%	-821	-14.11%	5,819
Kern	44,828	48.29%	45,775	49.31%	1,616	1.74%	621	0.67%	-947	-1.02%	92,840
Kings	7,444	52.11%	6,540	45.78%	163	1.14%	138	0.97%	904	6.33%	14,285
Lake	4,733	45.71%	5,381	51.97%	159	1.54%	81	0.78%	-648	-6.26%	10,354
Lassen	3,111	57.13%	2,165	39.76%	117	2.15%	52	0.96%	946	17.37%	5,445
Los Angeles	1,059,533	52.84%	898,808	44.82%	24,601	1.23%	22,223	1.11%	160,725	8.02%	2,005,165
Madera	5,584	51.17%	5,137	47.08%	124	1.14%	67	0.61%	447	4.10%	10,912
Marin	36,384	45.84%	40,619	51.18%	905	1.14%	1,456	1.83%	-4,235	-5.34%	79,364
Mariposa	1,658	45.28%	1,893	51.69%	66	1.80%	45	1.23%	-235	-6.42%	3,662
Mendocino	9,158	50.31%	8,373	46.00%	312	1.71%	360	1.98%	785	4.31%	18,203
Merced	12,779	51.89%	11,339	46.05%	318	1.29%	189	0.77%	1,440	5.85%	24,625
Modoc	1,395	44.16%	1,705	53.97%	41	1.30%	18	0.57%	-310	-9.81%	3,159
Mono	817	39.45%	1,161	56.06%	55	2.66%	38	1.83%	-344	-16.61%	2,071
Monterey	28,832	46.09%	32,218	51.50%	748	1.20%	764	1.22%	-3,386	-5.41%	62,562
Napa	15,200	47.44%	16,048	50.09%	441	1.38%	350	1.09%	-848	-2.65%	32,039
Nevada	5,225	41.00%	7,101	55.72%	249	1.95%	169	1.33%	-1,876	-14.72%	12,744
Orange	212,638	40.60%	297,870	56.87%	8,198	1.57%	5,090	0.97%	-85,232	-16.27%	523,796
Placer	15,744	50.50%	14,510	46.54%	566	1.82%	358	1.15%	1,234	3.96%	31,178
Plumas	3,031	55.77%	2,279	41.93%	66	1.21%	59	1.09%	752	13.84%	5,435
Riverside	70,515	47.93%	73,102	49.69%	2,115	1.44%	1,374	0.93%	-2,587	-1.76%	147,106
Sacramento	117,711	51.62%	104,595	45.86%	2,812	1.23%	2,934	1.29%	13,116	5.75%	228,052
San Benito	2,722	45.05%	3,199	52.95%	60	0.99%	61	1.01%	-477	-7.89%	6,042
San Bernardino	87,133	49.85%	82,611	47.27%	3,624	2.07%	1,413	0.81%	4,522	2.59%	174,782
San Diego	196,930	42.82%	249,444	54.24%	7,999	1.74%	5,501	1.20%	-52,514	-11.42%	459,874
San Francisco	136,896	61.81%	78,759	35.56%	1,806	0.82%	4,009	1.81%	58,137	26.25%	221,470
San Joaquin	38,429	45.69%	43,744	52.01%	1,284	1.53%	643	0.76%	-5,315	-6.32%	84,100
San Luis Obispo	19,429	47.82%	20,300	49.96%	394	0.97%	510	1.26%	-871	-2.14%	40,633
San Mateo	91,808	49.62%	88,235	47.69%	2,622	1.42%	2,361	1.28%	3,573	1.93%	185,026
Santa Barbara	42,221	45.99%	47,263	51.48%	854	0.93%	1,470	1.60%	-5,042	-5.49%	91,808
Santa Clara	166,760	50.63%	153,761	46.69%	4,628	1.41%	4,201	1.28%	12,999	3.95%	329,350
Santa Cruz	28,600	48.67%	27,750	47.23%	822	1.40%	1,587	2.70%	850	1.45%	58,789
Shasta	15,764	55.51%	11,716	41.25%	637	2.24%	284	1.00%	4,048	14.25%	28,401
Sierra	629	52.99%	513	43.22%	26	2.19%	19	1.60%	116	9.77%	1,187
Siskiyou	6,515	53.93%	5,229	43.28%	201	1.66%	136	1.13%	1,286	10.64%	12,081
Solano	24,955	54.43%	19,524	42.58%	591	1.29%	781	1.70%	5,431	11.84%	45,851
Sonoma	40,756	48.48%	40,339	47.98%	1,077	1.28%	1,898	2.26%	417	0.50%	84,070
Stanislaus	27,931	47.97%	29,186	50.13%	673	1.16%	430	0.74%	-1,255	-2.16%	58,220
Sutter	5,141	39.32%	7,642	58.45%	182	1.39%	110	0.84%	-2,501	-19.13%	13,075
Tehama	5,618	49.73%	5,373	47.56%	219	1.94%	87	0.77%	245	2.17%	11,297
Trinity	1,762	51.24%	1,519	44.17%	104	3.02%	54	1.57%	243	7.07%	3,439
Tulare	20,589	44.93%	24,103	52.60%	692	1.51%	440	0.96%	-3,514	-7.67%	45,824
Tuolumne	4,165	40.16%	5,952	57.39%	162	1.56%	93	0.90%	-1,787	-17.23%	10,372
Ventura	56,189	47.20%	60,122	50.50%	1,554	1.31%	1,184	0.99%	-3,933	-3.30%	119,049
Yolo	18,249	54.00%	14,734	43.60%	230	0.68%	579	1.71%	3,515	10.40%	33,792
Yuba	5,237	51.04%	4,752	46.32%	173	1.69%	98	0.96%	485	4.73%	10,260
Total	3,131,648	50.12%	2,952,954	47.26%	83,869	1.34%	75,004	1.20%	178,694	2.86%	6,248,070

==== Counties that flipped from Republican to Democratic ====
- Del Norte
- Humboldt
- Imperial
- Los Angeles
- Mendocino
- Merced
- Placer
- San Bernardino
- San Mateo
- Santa Clara
- Santa Cruz
- Siskiyou
- Solano
- Sonoma
- Tehama
- Trinity
- Yuba

==== Counties that flipped from Democratic to Republican ====
- Stanislaus
