= Houston Flournoy =

American politician (1929–2008)

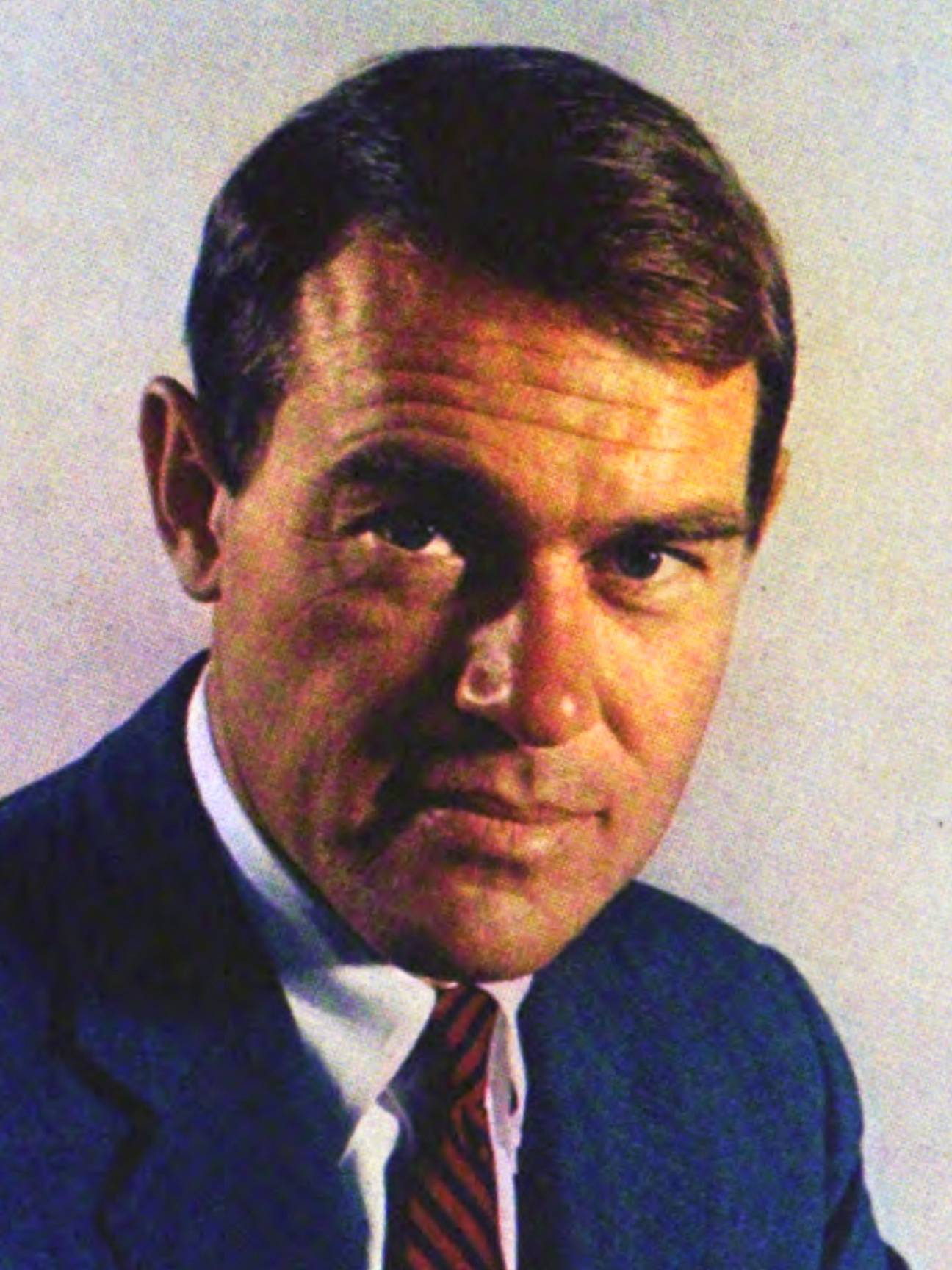
- Official portrait, 1971

26th Controller of California
- In office January 2, 1967 – January 6, 1975
- Governor: Ronald Reagan
- Preceded by: Alan Cranston
- Succeeded by: Kenneth Cory

Member of the California State Assembly from the 49th district
- In office January 2, 1961 – January 2, 1967
- Preceded by: Ernest R. Geddes
- Succeeded by: Peter F. Schabarum

Personal details
- Born: Houston Irving Flournoy; October 7, 1929 New York City, U.S.
- Died: January 7, 2008 (aged 78) California, U.S.

Military service
- Allegiance: United States
- Branch/service: United States Air Force
- Battles/wars: Korean War

Houston Irving Flournoy (October 7, 1929 – January 7, 2008) was an American politician who served as a California legislator and the 26th California State Controller from 1967 to 1975 under Governor Ronald Reagan. He later became a professor of public administration at the University of Southern California (USC). As of 2024, Flournoy is the last Republican to have officially served as California State Controller to date.

Flournoy was born in New York City. He attended Cornell University in Ithaca, New York, where he was active in the Cornell University Glee Club and the Lambda Chi Alpha fraternity. He studied under Clinton Rossiter, a Cornell faculty member who was an authority on The Federalist. After graduating from Cornell in 1950, he served in the United States Air Force during the Korean War. In 1956, he earned a Ph.D. in politics at Princeton University. While in New Jersey, he worked in politics as a researcher for the New Jersey Legislature and an aide to Senator H. Alexander Smith.

In 1957, Flournoy took a faculty position in the Pomona College Department of Political Science, where he quickly won tenure and remained a full time professor until 1960 and a part time faculty member until 1966, when he ran for California State Controller. In 1960, he successfully ran for California State Assembly as a Republican Party candidate, and served from 1961 to 1967. In 1966, he was elected California State Controller and served as Controller from 1967 to 1975.

In 1974, Flournoy ran for Governor of California. He defeated the more conservative choice, Lieutenant Governor Ed Reinecke, in the GOP primary but then lost a surprisingly close election to Democratic Secretary of State Jerry Brown in a heavily Democratic year. Flournoy blamed his loss on President Gerald Ford's pardon of Richard Nixon in September, 1974. He never ran for political office again.

Flournoy was appointed professor at USC in Los Angeles in 1976. He taught at the School of Public Administration (now part of the School of Policy, Planning, and Development) until 1993. He also served the USC administration as a governmental affairs advisor until 1999. He also served on the boards of several corporations. After retirement he resided in Ponte Vedra Beach, Florida, and Bodega Bay, California. Flournoy died of congestive heart failure on January 7, 2008, on a flight from San Diego to Santa Rosa, California.

California Assembly
Preceded by Ernest R. Geddes	California State Assemblyman, 49th District; January 2, 1961 - January 2, 1967	Succeeded by Peter F. Schabarum
Political offices
Preceded by Alan Cranston	California State Controller; January 2, 1967 – January 6, 1975	Succeeded by Kenneth Cory
Party political offices
Preceded by Ronald Reagan	Republican nominee for Governor of California; 1974	Succeeded by Evelle J. Younger
