= Electoral history of Gavin Newsom =

Elections featuring Governor of California

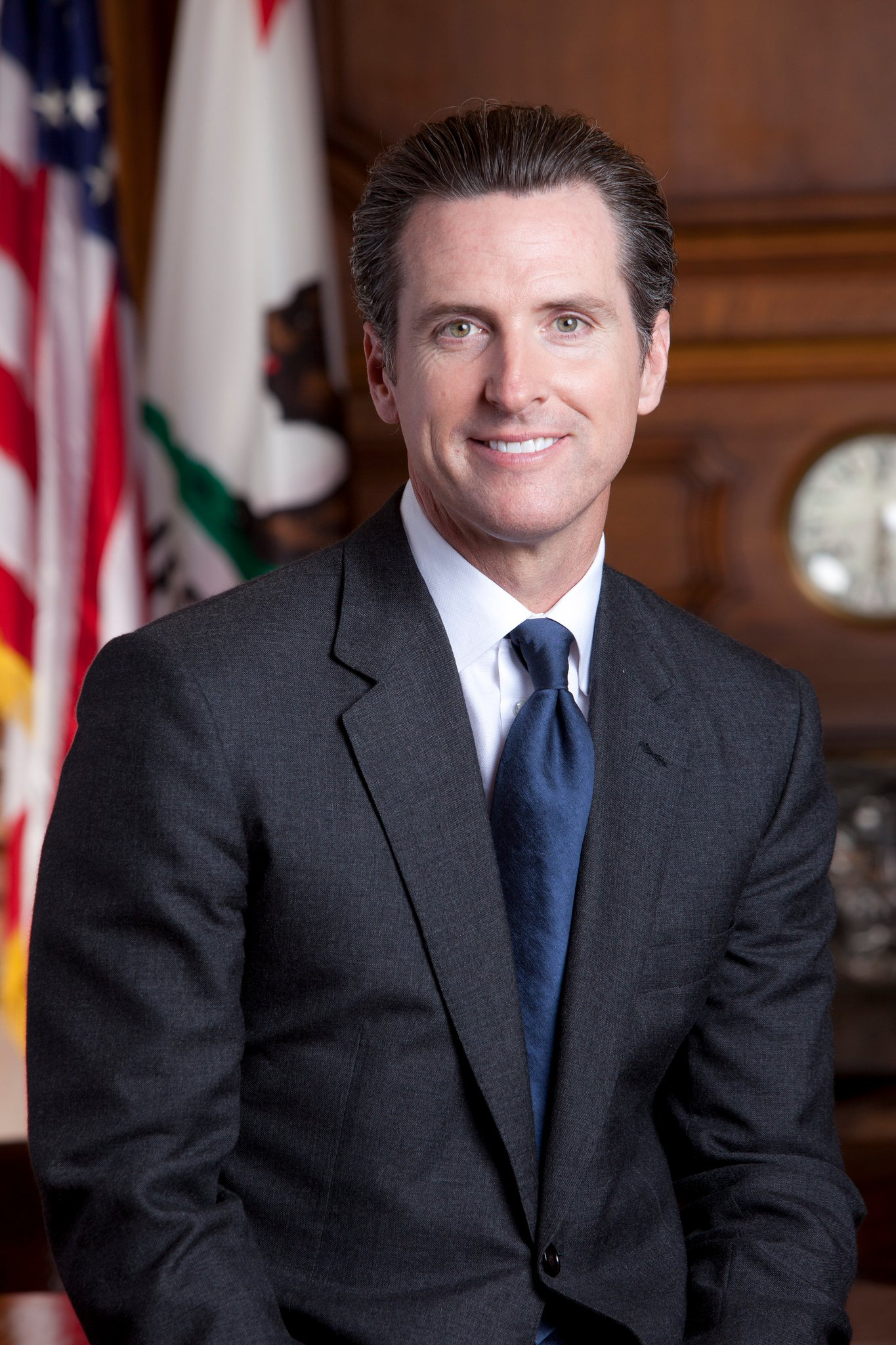
Gavin Newsom in 2011.

This is the electoral history for Gavin Newsom, who has served on the San Francisco Board of Supervisors and as Mayor of San Francisco and Lieutenant Governor of California. He is the current governor of California.

== Electoral history ==
=== San Francisco Board of Supervisors ===
San Francisco Board of Supervisors elections, 1998
Candidate	Votes	%
Tom Ammiano (incumbent)	120,291	
Gavin Newsom (incumbent)	109,015	
Mabel Teng (incumbent)	95,093	
Mark Leno (incumbent)	82,449	
Amos Brown (incumbent)	67,554	
Victor Marquez	58,935	
Rose Tsai	58,571	
Donna Casey	57,788	
Denise D'Anne	35,244	
Lucrecia Bermudez	23,115	
Shawn O'Hearn	17,664	
Jim Reid	16,902	
Carlos Petroni	16,293	
Len Pettigrew	15,049	
Tahnee Stair	11,621	
Frederick Hobson	8,048	
Sam Lucas	7,858	
Turnout	{{{votes}}}	55.8%

District 2 supervisorial election, 2000
Candidate	Votes	%
Gavin Newsom (incumbent)	26,433	97.65
Write-in	637	2.35
Invalid or blank votes	11,136	29.15
Turnout	{{{votes}}}	69.8%

District 2 supervisorial election, 2002
Candidate	Votes	%
Gavin Newsom (incumbent)	15,674	78.77
Lynne Newhouse Segal	3,247	15.81
Len Pettigrew	821	4.13
H. Brown	209	1.05
Write-in	48	0.24
Valid votes	19,899	82.14%
Invalid or blank votes	4,326	17.86
Total votes	24,225	100.00
Turnout	{{{votes}}}	52.69%

=== Mayor of San Francisco ===
San Francisco mayoral election, 2003
Party	Candidate	Votes	%
Democratic	Gavin Newsom	87,196	41.92
Green	Matt Gonzalez	40,714	19.57
Democratic	Angela Alioto	33,446	16.08
Democratic	Tom Ammiano	21,452	10.31
Democratic	Susan Leal	17,641	8.48
Republican	Tony Ribera	5,015	2.41
Libertarian	Michael F. Denny	925	0.44
Independent	Roger E. Schulke	735	0.36
Independent	Jim Reid	733	0.35
Write-in		131	0.06
Total votes		208,028	100.00
Runoff election
Democratic	Gavin Newsom	133,546	52.81
Green	Matt Gonzalez	119,329	47.19
Total votes		252,875	100.00

San Francisco mayoral election, 2007
Party	Candidate	Votes	%
Democratic	Gavin Newsom (incumbent)	105,596	73.66
Democratic	Quintin Mecke	9,076	6.33
Republican	Harold Hoogasian	8,400	5.86
Peace and Freedom	Wilma Pang	7,274	5.07
Independent	Ahimsa Sumchai	3,398	2.37
Green	Chicken John	2,508	1.75
Marijuana	Lonnie Holmes	1,807	1.26
Green	Josh Wolf	1,772	1.24
Workers World	Grasshopper Kaplan	1,423	0.99
Independent	Harold Brown	915	0.64
Libertarian	George Davis	644	0.45
American Independent	Michael Powers	519	0.36
Independent	Lea Sherman (write-in)	9	0.01
Independent	Rodney Hauge (write-in)	6	0.00
Independent	Patrick Monette-Shaw (write-in)	6	0.00
Independent	Kenneth Kahn (write-in)	3	0.00
Independent	Robert Kully (write-in)	2	0.00
Independent	Robert McCullough (write-in)	1	0.00
Total votes		143,359	100.00
Democratic hold			

=== Lieutenant Governor of California ===
California Democratic lieutenant governor primary, 2010
Party	Candidate	Votes	%
Democratic	Gavin Newsom	1,308,860	55.5
Democratic	Janice Hahn	780,115	33.3
Democratic	Eric Korevaar	257,349	10.9
Total votes		2,346,324	100.00
Turnout	7,553,109	31.0%	

California lieutenant governor election, 2010
Party	Candidate	Votes	%
Democratic	Gavin Newsom	4,917,880	50.2
Republican	Abel Maldonado (incumbent)	3,820,971	39.0
Libertarian	Pamela Brown	574,640	5.9
American Independent	Jim King	184,899	1.9
Green	James Castillo	163,987	1.6
Peace and Freedom	C. T. Weber	112,243	1.1
Independent	Karen England (write-in)	34,119	0.3
Invalid or blank votes			
Total votes		9,808,739	100.00
Turnout			
Democratic gain from Republican			

California lieutenant gubernatorial primary election, 2014
Party	Candidate	Votes	%
Democratic	Gavin Newsom (Incumbent)	2,082,902	49.87
Republican	Ron Nehring	976,128	23.37
Republican	David Fennell	357,242	8.55
Republican	George Yang	333,857	7.99
Democratic	Eric Korevaar	232,596	5.57
Green	Jena F. Goodman	98,338	2.35
Americans Elect	Alan Reynolds	56,027	1.34
Peace and Freedom	Amos Johnson	39,675	0.95
Total votes		4,176,765	100
Turnout			14.14

California lieutenant gubernatorial general election, 2014
Party	Candidate	Votes	%
Democratic	Gavin Newsom (Incumbent)	4,107,051	57.2
Republican	Ron Nehring	3,078,039	42.8
Total votes		7,185,090	100

2018 California gubernatorial election map by county

=== Governor of California ===
California Governor primary election, 2018
Party	Candidate	Votes	%
Democratic	Gavin Newsom	2,343,792	33.7%
Republican	John H. Cox	1,766,488	25.4%
Democratic	Antonio Villaraigosa	926,394	13.3%
Republican	Travis Allen	658,798	9.5%
Democratic	John Chiang	655,920	9.4%
Democratic	Delaine Eastin	234,869	3.4%
Democratic	Amanda Renteria	93,446	1.3%
Republican	Robert C. Newman II	44,674	0.6%
Democratic	Michael Shellenberger	31,692	0.5%
Republican	Peter Y. Liu	27,336	0.4%
Republican	Yvonne Girard	21,840	0.3%
Peace and Freedom	Gloria La Riva	19,075	0.3%
Democratic	J. Bribiesca	18,586	0.3%
Green	Josh Jones	16,131	0.2%
Libertarian	Zoltan Istvan	14,462	0.2%
Democratic	Albert Caesar Mezzetti	12,026	0.2%
Libertarian	Nickolas Wildstar	11,566	0.2%
Democratic	Robert Davidson Griffis	11,103	0.2%
Democratic	Akinyemi Agbede	9,380	0.1%
Democratic	Thomas Jefferson Cares	8,937	0.1%
Green	Christopher N. Carlson	7,302	0.1%
Democratic	Klement Tinaj	5,368	0.1%
No party preference	Hakan "Hawk" Mikado	5,346	0.1%
No party preference	Johnny Wattenburg	4,973	0.1%
No party preference	Desmond Silveira	4,633	0.1%
No party preference	Shubham Goel	4,020	0.1%
No party preference	Jeffrey Edward Taylor	3,973	0.1%
Green	Veronika Fimbres (write-in)	62	0.0%
No party preference	Arman Soltani (write-in)	32	0.0%
No party preference	Peter Crawford Valentino (write-in)	21	0.0%
Republican	K. Pearce (write-in)	8	0.0%
No party preference	Armando M. Arreola (write-in)	1	0.0%
Total votes		6,862,254	100.0%

California gubernatorial election, 2018
Party	Candidate	Votes	%	±%
Democratic	Gavin Newsom	7,721,410	61.95%	+1.98%
Republican	John H. Cox	4,742,825	38.05%	−1.98%
Total votes		12,464,235	100.0%	N/A
Democratic hold				

2021 California gubernatorial recall election (question 1)
Choice	Votes	%
No on recall	7,944,092	61.88
Yes on recall	4,894,473	38.12
Blank and invalid votes	54,013	–
Total votes	12,892,578	100
Registered voters and turnout	22,057,154	58.45%

California Governor primary election, 2022
Party	Candidate	Votes	%
Democratic	Gavin Newsom (incumbent)	3,945,728	55.9
Republican	Brian Dahle	1,252,800	17.7
No party preference	Michael Shellenberger	290,286	4.1
Republican	Jenny Rae Le Roux	246,665	3.5
Republican	Anthony Trimino	246,322	3.5
Republican	Shawn Collins	173,083	2.5
Green	Luis J. Rodriguez	124,672	1.8
Republican	Leo S. Zacky	94,521	1.3
Republican	Major Williams	92,580	1.3
Republican	Robert C. Newman II	82,849	1.2
Democratic	Joel Ventresca	66,885	0.9
Republican	David Lozano	66,542	0.9
Republican	Ronald A. Anderson	53,554	0.8
No party preference	Reinette Senum	53,015	0.8
Democratic	Armando Perez-Serrato	45,474	0.6
Republican	Ron Jones	38,337	0.5
Republican	Daniel R. Mercuri	36,396	0.5
Green	Heather Collins	29,690	0.4
Democratic	Anthony Fanara	25,086	0.4
Republican	Cristian Raul Morales	22,304	0.3
Republican	Lonnie Sortor	21,044	0.3
No party preference	Frederic C. Schultz	17,502	0.2
No party preference	Woodrow Sanders III	16,204	0.2
No party preference	James G. Hanink	10,110	0.1
No party preference	Serge Fiankan	6,201	0.1
No party preference	Bradley Zink	5,997	0.1
American Independent	Jeff Scott (write-in)	13	0.0
Republican	Gurinder Bhangoo (write-in)	8	0.0
Total votes		7,063,868	100.0

California Governor general election, 2022
Party	Candidate	Votes	%	±%
Democratic	Gavin Newsom (incumbent)	6,470,104	59.18%	−2.77
Republican	Brian Dahle	4,462,914	40.82%	+2.77
Total votes		10,933,018	100.00%	N/A
Turnout		10,933,018	50.80%	−12.48
Registered electors		21,940,274		
Democratic hold				
