= James L. Flournoy =

American politician (1915–2009)

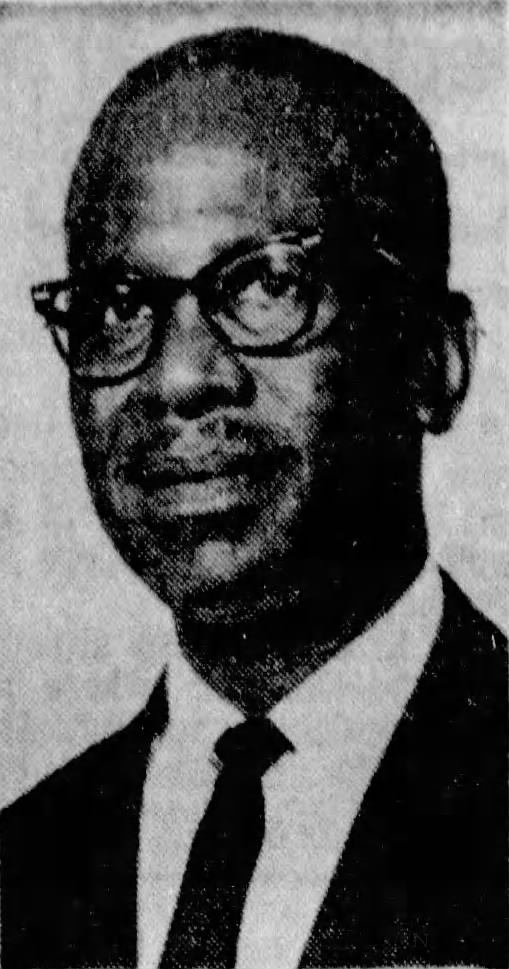

Personal details
- Born: James Lowell Flournoy; December 12, 1915 Como, Texas, U.S.
- Died: February 21, 2009 (aged 93) Moreno Valley, California, U.S.
- Party: Republican
- Children: 2
- Education: Bishop College; Southwestern Law School

James Lowell Flournoy (December 12, 1915 – February 21, 2009) was an African American attorney and politician from California. He was notable for being first African American nominated by either party for partisan office in California.

== Early life ==
Flournoy was born on December 12, 1915, in Como, Texas. He attended high school in Texarkana, and later graduated from Bishop College in Marshall, Texas in chemistry. He was later a math and science teacher and basketball coach. Flournoy served in the United States Army during World War II. He later moved to Southern California after the war, where he attended Southwestern University Law School.

== Political career ==
In 1962, Flournoy ran unsuccessfully for a seat on the state Board of Equalization. In 1966, he lost the Republican primary for California's 31st Congressional district. During the 1968 presidential election, he served as national director of the Black Americans for Nixon-Agnew. In 1970, he ran for Secretary of State, but lost to Jerry Brown. In 1974, he ran for primary for state controller unsuccessfully. He later was appointed to the Workmen's Compensation Board by then-Governor Ronald Reagan. He later served as deputy director of the California Department of Motor Vehicles.

== Personal life ==
Flournoy was married to his first wife, Lovelia Johnson, who predeceased him in 1981. He was survived by two children. Flournoy died of heart failure on February 21, 2009, in Moreno Valley at the age of 93.
