= 1970 California Secretary of State election =

- November 3, 1970
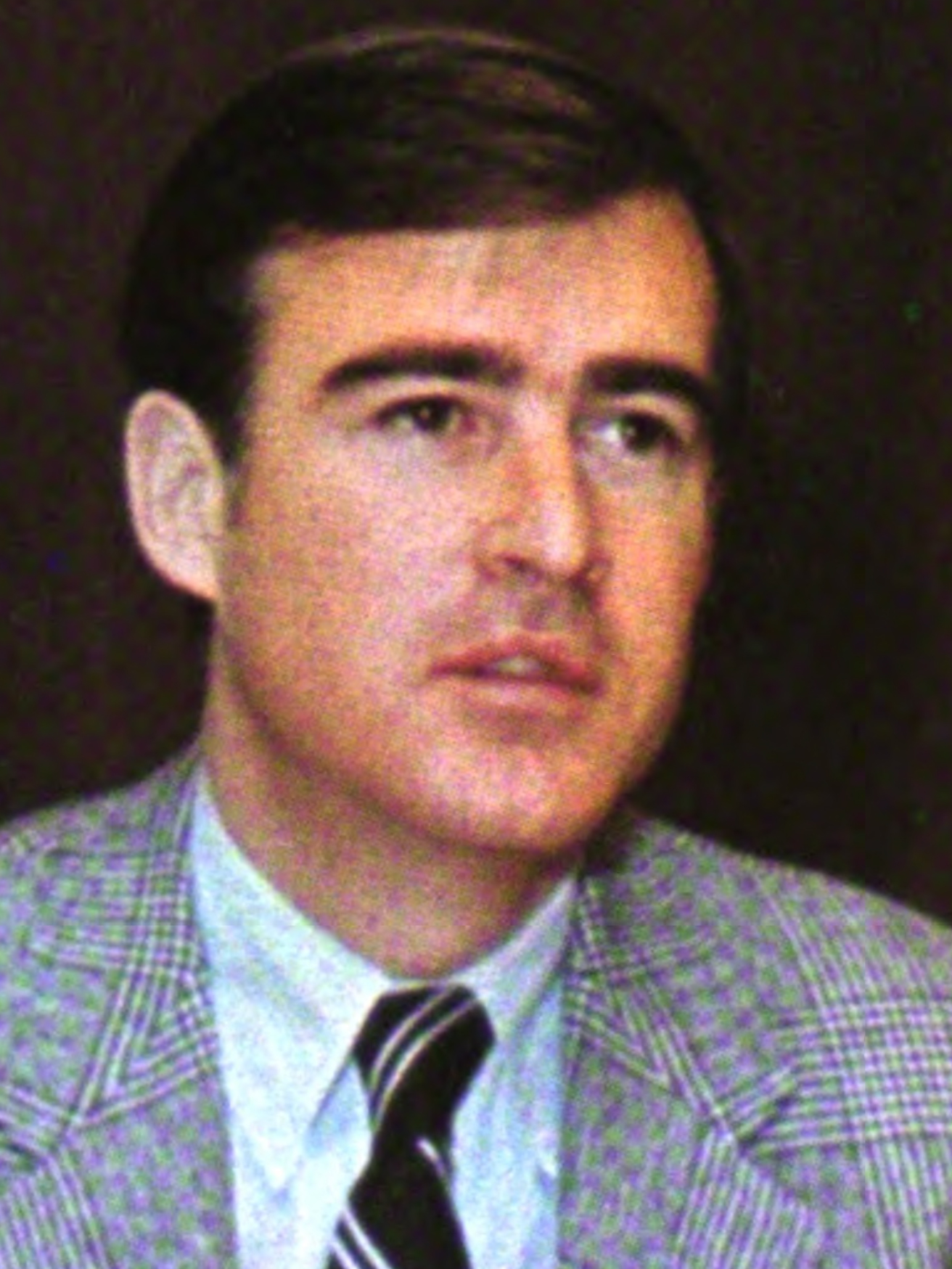

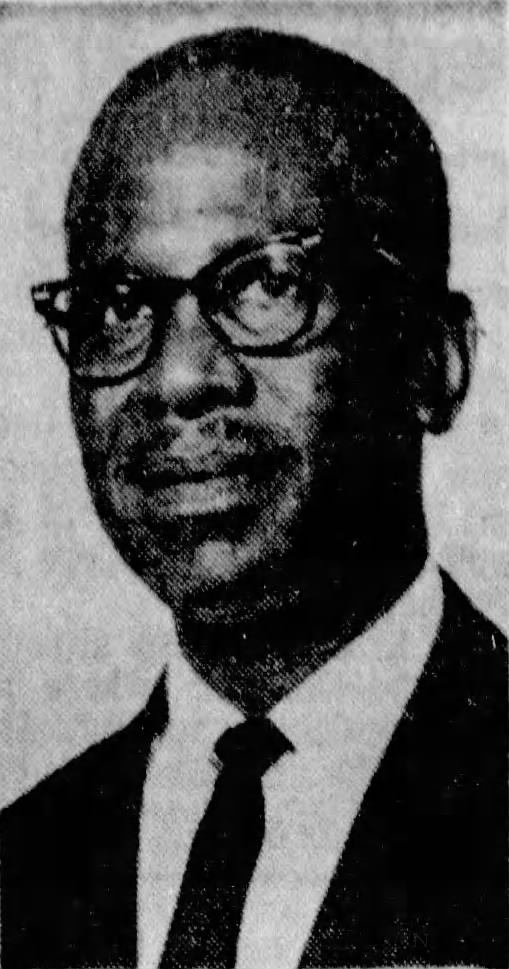
Nominee	Jerry Brown	James L. Flournoy
Party	Democratic	Republican
Popular vote	3,234,788	2,926,613
Percentage	50.41%	45.61%
- County results Brown: 40–50% 50–60% 60–70% Flournoy: 40–50% 50–60%
Secretary of State before election
Frank M. Jordan
Republican
Elected Secretary of State
Jerry Brown
Democratic

The 1970 California Secretary of State election was held on November 3, 1970. Democratic nominee Jerry Brown narrowly defeated Republican nominee James L. Flournoy with 50.41% of the vote.

== Primary elections ==
Primary elections were held on June 2, 1970.

=== Democratic primary ===
==== Candidates ====
- Jerry Brown, member of the Los Angeles Community College District Board of Trustees
- Hugh M. Burns, State Senator
- Jimmy Campbell

==== Results ====
Democratic primary results
Party	Candidate	Votes	%
Democratic	Jerry Brown	1,632,886	67.70
Democratic	Hugh M. Burns	591,320	24.52
Democratic	Jimmy Campbell	187,899	7.79
Total votes		2,412,105	100.00

=== Republican primary ===
==== Candidates ====
- James L. Flournoy, attorney
- George W. Milias, State Assemblyman
- Alberta Jordan
- J. C. Chambers
- John E. "Jack" Leadbetter
- Wendell T. Handy
- Kim Harris Pearman

==== Results ====
Republican primary results
Party	Candidate	Votes	%
Republican	James L. Flournoy	543,881	30.23
Republican	George W. Milias	401,560	22.32
Republican	Alberta Jordan	257,512	14.31
Republican	J. C. Chambers	195,556	10.87
Republican	John E. "Jack" Leadbetter	172,213	9.57
Republican	Wendell T. Handy	143,534	7.98
Republican	Kim Harris Pearman	85,008	4.73
Total votes		1,799,264	100.00

== General election ==
=== Candidates ===
Major party candidates

- Jerry Brown, Democratic
- James L. Flournoy, Republican

Other candidates

- Thomas M. Goodloe Jr., American Independent
- Israel Feuer, Peace and Freedom

=== Results ===
1970 California Secretary of State election
Party	Candidate	Votes	%	±%
Democratic	Jerry Brown	3,234,788	50.41%	
Republican	James L. Flournoy	2,926,613	45.61%	
American Independent	Thomas M. Goodloe Jr.	144,838	2.26%	
Peace and Freedom	Israel Feuer	110,184	1.72%	
Majority		308,175		
Turnout				
Democratic gain from Republican		Swing		
